= 2017 SEABA Championship =

12th Southeast Asian Basketball Championship

Tournament details
- Host country: Philippines
- Dates: 12–18 May
- Teams: 7 (from 10 federations)
- Venue: 1 (in 1 host city)

Final positions
- Champions: Philippines (8th title)

Tournament statistics
- Top scorer: (Myanmar) Wana Aung (16.8)
- Top rebounds: (Vietnam) Nguyễn Văn Hùng (10.2)
- Top assists: (Indonesia) Mario Wuysang (5.3)
- PPG (Team): Philippines (113.0)
- RPG (Team): Philippines (51.3)
- APG (Team): Philippines (27.7)

Official website
- http://www.fiba.com/asiacup/2017/seaba

The 12th Southeast Asia Basketball Association Championship was the qualifying tournament for the 2017 FIBA Asia Cup. It also served as a regional championship involving Southeast Asian basketball teams. It was held from 12 to 18 May 2017 in the Philippines.

Originally scheduled to be held from 23 to 30 April 2017, SEABA decided to postpone the tournament to 15 to 21 May 2017 due to conflicting schedule with the ASEAN Basketball League and the Indonesian Basketball League. For the first time, this tournament only allotted one spot for the subzone for the renamed continental championship which was held in Lebanon from 10 to 20 August 2017.

Aside from the hosts, the national teams of Indonesia, Malaysia, Myanmar, Singapore, Thailand and Vietnam participated in the week-long tournament.

The SEABA U16 Championship for Men was also hosted by the Philippines from 14 to 18 May 2017 at the same venue.

== Host selection ==
The defending champions, through the Samahang Basketbol ng Pilipinas (SBP), was awarded the hosting rights of the championship. This was the first time that the Philippines hosted the SEABA Championship since 2001. The country signified its interest to host the 2017 tournament sometime in December 2016, before the December 31 deadline set by SEABA.

== Teams ==
(NR) - Not ranked

Team	Tournament best finish	FIBA World Ranking	FIBA Asia Ranking
Indonesia	Champions (1996)	72	18
Malaysia	Champions (1994, 2005)	67	14
Myanmar	6th place (1994)	T-92	NR
Philippines	Champions (1998, 2001, 2003, 2007, 2009, 2011, 2015)	27	3
Singapore	3rd place (2001, 2013, 2015)	82	23
Thailand	Champions (2013)	81	22
Vietnam	4th place (2003)	T-92	NR

== Venue ==
Smart Araneta Coliseum in Quezon City was the main venue of the weeklong tournament.

Quezon City
Smart Araneta Coliseum	2017 SEABA Championship (Metro Manila)
Capacity: 25,000	2017 SEABA Championship (Metro Manila)

== Officials ==
=== Commissioners ===
- (Malaysia) Wong Chung Min
- (Philippines) Daniel Danilo Soria
- (Philippines) Hector Villanueva

=== Referees ===
The following referees were selected for the tournament.

- (Hong Kong) Yuen Chun Yip
- (Indonesia) Harja Jaladri
- (Indonesia) Rendra Lesmana
- (Macau) Chan Kin Pong
- (Malaysia) Chu Wei Chuen
- (Malaysia) Ting Pick Kieng
- (Myanmar) Linn Maung
- (Philippines) Arnolfo Bermeo
- (Philippines) Ferdinand Pascual
- (Philippines) Joenard García
- (Philippines) Michael Tolentino
- (Philippines) Ricor Buarón
- (Singapore) Leong Chuen Wing
- (Chinese Taipei) Chuang Chih-Chun
- (Chinese Taipei) Yu Jung
- (Thailand) Nattapong Jontapa
- (Thailand) Samphan Kamphusiriphan

== Results ==
Pos	Team	Pld	W	L	PF	PA	PD	Pts	Qualification
1	Philippines (C, H)	6	6	0	678	326	+352	12	Qualified to 2017 FIBA Asia Cup and 2019 FIBA Basketball World Cup Asian Qualifiers
2	Indonesia	6	5	1	476	350	+126	11	
3	Thailand	6	4	2	431	376	+55	10	
4	Malaysia	6	3	3	387	440	−53	9	
5	Singapore	6	2	4	372	388	−16	8	
6	Vietnam	6	1	5	375	481	−106	7	
7	Myanmar	6	0	6	272	630	−358	6	

Source: FIBA
Rules for classification: (1) Tournament points, (2) Head-to-head tournament points, (3) Head-to-head goal average, (4) Overall goal average, (5) Drawing of lots
(C) Champions; (H) Hosts

May 12
15:00

Stats

Indonesia	71–50	Singapore
Scoring by quarter: 18–3, 22–8, 16–18, 15–21
Pts: Wuysang 20; Rebs: Nugroho 7 Asts: Lakudu 4		Pts: Liew 11; Rebs: H. Ng 9 Asts: Wong 4

Smart Araneta Coliseum, Quezon City
Referees: Chuang Chih-Chun (TPE), Ferdinand Pascual (PHI), Chu Wei Chuen (MAS)

May 12
17:00

Stats

Malaysia	67–74	Thailand
Scoring by quarter: 25–15, 16–21, 8–19, 18–19
Pts: Choo 12; Rebs: Mak, Ting 7 Asts: Ting 4		Pts: Ananti 24; Rebs: C. Klahan 11; Asts: Sunthonsiri 5

Smart Araneta Coliseum, Quezon City
Referees: Yuen Chun Yip (HKG), Chan Kin Pong (MAC), Ricor Buarón (PHI)

May 12
19:00

Stats

Myanmar	40–147	Philippines
Scoring by quarter: 7–32, 5–34, 17–44, 11–37
Pts: Wana Aung 12; Rebs: Aung Myat Phyo 8 Asts: Thein Han, Aung Myat Phyo 2		Pts: Abueva 22; Rebs: Almazan, Rosario 7 Asts: Jalalon 10

Smart Araneta Coliseum, Quezon City
Referees: Yu Jung (TPE), Leong Chuen Wing (SIN), Samphan Kamphusiriphan (THA)

May 13
15:00

Stats

Vietnam	49 (Note: The official stats from FIBA.com show Vietnam scoring 4 in the 1st quarter and 49 for the game, while the television coverage and other news articles show 6 and 51, respectively.)–76	Thailand
Scoring by quarter: 4 –22, 16–18, 16–19, 13–17
Pts: Trần Vũ Linh 10; Rebs: Nguyễn Văn Hùng 10; Asts: Đặng Thái Hùng 4		Pts: Dasom 11; Rebs: Lodliang 10; Asts: Sunthonsiri 6

Smart Araneta Coliseum, Quezon City
Referees: Chan Kin Pong (MAC), Ricor Buaron (PHI), Linn Maung (MYA)

May 13
17:00

Stats

Indonesia	63–42	Malaysia
Scoring by quarter: 14–6, 14–13, 16–18, 19–5
Pts: Grahita 26; Rebs: Sitorus 12; Asts: Pratama, Wuysang 4		Pts: Choo 9 Rebs: Ong 5 Asts: Ting 2

Smart Araneta Coliseum, Quezon City
Referees: Yu Jung (TPE), Arnolfo Bermeo (PHI), Leong Chuen Wing (SIN)

May 13
19:00

Stats

Philippines	113–66	Singapore
Scoring by quarter: 31–9, 32–20, 26–22, 24–15
Pts: Abueva 16; Rebs: Blatche 9 Asts: William 5		Pts: Liew 14; Rebs: Wong 6 Asts: Kwek 4

Smart Araneta Coliseum, Quezon City
Referees: Yuen Chun Yip (HKG), Chuang Chih-Chun (TPE), Harja Jaladri (INA)

May 14
15:00

Stats

Thailand	59–60	Indonesia
Scoring by quarter: 18–11, 11–15, 10–19, 20–15
Pts: Ananti 24; Rebs: Chanthachon 11; Asts: Muangboon 4		Pts: Kurniawan 17; Rebs: Sitepu 6 Asts: Wuysang 5

Smart Araneta Coliseum, Quezon City
Referees: Yu Jung (TPE), Arnolfo Bermeo (PHI), Chu Wei Chuen (MAS)

May 14
17:00

Stats

Myanmar	44–77	Vietnam
Scoring by quarter: 7–24, 11–16, 15–10, 11–27
Pts: Wana Aung 21; Rebs: Thein Han 8 Asts: Sei Thu Tun Tun 5		Pts: Nguyễn Văn Hùng 22; Rebs: Nguyễn Văn Hùng 15; Asts: Triệu Hán Minh 7

Smart Araneta Coliseum, Quezon City
Referees: Ferdinand Pascual (PHI), Harja Jaladri (INA), Yuen Chun Yip (HKG)

May 14
19:00

Stats

Malaysia	51–106	Philippines
Scoring by quarter: 17–36, 9–25, 9–27, 16–18
Pts: Heng 12; Rebs: Choo 4 Asts: three players 2 each		Pts: Blatche, Rosario 13; Rebs: Blatche, Jalalon 8 Asts: Romeo 7

Smart Araneta Coliseum, Quezon City
Referees: Chuang Chih-Chun (TPE), Samphan Kamphusiriphan (THA), Leong Chuen Wing (SIN)

May 15
15:00

Stats

Thailand	102–35	Myanmar
Scoring by quarter: 28–11, 19–8, 31–6, 24–10
Pts: Dasom 40; Rebs: Dasom 11; Asts: Sunthonsiri 10		Pts: Wana Aung 10; Rebs: Thein Han 10; Asts: 4 players 1 each

Smart Araneta Coliseum, Quezon City
Referees: Arnolfo Bermeo (PHI), Harja Jaladri (INA), Ting Pick Kieng (MAS)

May 15
17:00

Stats

Singapore	41–45	Malaysia
Scoring by quarter: 13–15, 7–11, 10–9, 11–10
Pts: Goh 17; Rebs: Goh 12; Asts: Wong 4		Pts: Ting 18; Rebs: Chan, Ting 7 Asts: Liaw, Teo 2

Smart Araneta Coliseum, Quezon City
Referees: Yu Jung (TPE), Ricor Buarón (PHI), Samphan Kamphusiriphan (THA)

May 15
19:00

Stats

Indonesia	95–52	Vietnam
Scoring by quarter: 19–10, 22–10, 24–17, 30–15
Pts: Prastawa 19; Rebs: Sitorus 11; Asts: Wuysang 10		Pts: Lê Ngôc Tu, Triệu Hán Minh 12; Rebs: Nguyễn Thân Nhân 6 Asts: Triệu Hán Minh 3

Smart Araneta Coliseum, Quezon City
Referees: Chan Kin Pong (MAC), Jeonard García (PHI), Linn Maung (MYA)

May 16
15:00

Stats

Myanmar	32–85	Singapore
Scoring by quarter: 5–22, 4–22, 17–19, 6–22
Pts: Wana Aung, Thein Han 11; Rebs: Aung Myat Phyo 7 Asts: three players 2 each		Pts: Raj 19; Rebs: H. Ng 15; Asts: Wong 9

Smart Araneta Coliseum, Quezon City
Referees: Chan Kin Pong (MAC), Rendra Lesmana (INA), Michael Tolentino (PHI)

May 16
17:00

Stats

Malaysia	86–85 (OT)	Vietnam
Scoring by quarter: 15–15, 15–20, 20–19, 26–22, Overtime: 10–9
Pts: Ting 28; Rebs: Chan 11; Asts: Teo 11		Pts: Triệu Hán Minh 20; Rebs: Nguyễn Văn Hùng 12; Asts: Lê Ngôc Tu 6

Smart Araneta Coliseum, Quezon City
Referees: Yuen Chun Yip (HKG), Nattapong Jontapa (THA), Arnolfo Bermeo (PHI)

May 16
19:00

Stats

Philippines	108–53	Thailand
Scoring by quarter: 18–14, 33–12, 29–17, 28–10
Pts: Aguilar 23; Rebs: Fajardo 11; Asts: Abueva 6		Pts: Chanthachon 16; Rebs: Chanthachon 7 Asts: C. Klahan 3

Smart Araneta Coliseum, Quezon City
Referees: Chuang Chih-Chun (TPE), Harja Jaladri (INA), Leong Chuen Wing (SIN)

May 17
15:00

Stats

Myanmar	50–123	Indonesia
Scoring by quarter: 15–28, 8–27, 16–35, 11–33
Pts: Wana Aung 16; Rebs: Thein Han 6 Asts: Thein Han, Zaya Aung 3		Pts: Grahita 19; Rebs: Nugroho 9 Asts: Lakudu, Dhyaksa 6

Smart Araneta Coliseum, Quezon City
Referees: Samphan Kamphusiriphan (THA), Meo Kok Eng (SIN), Joenard García (PHI)

May 17
17:00

Stats

Singapore	57–67	Thailand
Scoring by quarter: 16–22, 18–16, 17–21, 6–8
Pts: Liew 17; Rebs: Goh 12; Asts: Wong 6		Pts: Ananti 17; Rebs: P. Klahan 10; Asts: Ananti 3

Smart Araneta Coliseum, Quezon City
Referees: Yuen Chun Yip (HKG), Ferdinand Pascual (PHI), Chu Wei Chuen (MAS)

May 17
19:00

Stats

Vietnam	52–107	Philippines
Scoring by quarter: 16–28, 13–25, 11–36, 12–18
Pts: Nguyễn Thân Nhân 11; Rebs: Nguyễn Văn Hùng 5 Asts: five players 1 each		Pts: Wright 19; Rebs: Fajardo 12; Asts: Romeo 6

Smart Araneta Coliseum, Quezon City
Referees: Yu Jung (TPE), Chan Kin Pong (MAC), Linn Maung (MYA)

May 18
15:00

Stats

Malaysia	96–71	Myanmar
Scoring by quarter: 18–6, 27–26, 30–20, 21–19
Pts: Liaw 25; Rebs: Chin 13; Asts: three players 5 each		Pts: Wana Aung 31; Rebs: Thein Han 10; Asts: Sei Thu Tun Tun 6

Smart Araneta Coliseum, Quezon City
Referees: Ferdinand Pascual (PHI), Leong Chuen Wing (SIN), Rendra Lesmana (INA)

May 18
17:00

Stats

Vietnam	60–70 (Note: The official stats from FIBA.com show Singapore scoring 26 in the end of the 1st half and 70 for the game, while the television coverage and other news articles show 29 and 73, respectively.)	Singapore
Scoring by quarter: 17–18, 12–8, 18–18, 13–26
Pts: Triệu Hán Minh 17; Rebs: Nguyễn Văn Hùng 14; Asts: Lê Ngôc Tu 4		Pts: three players 15; Rebs: Goh 10; Asts: Kwek 6

Smart Araneta Coliseum, Quezon City
Referees: Harja Jaladri (INA), Samphan Kamphusiriphan (THA), Michael Tolentino (PHI)

May 18
19:00

Stats

Philippines	97–64	Indonesia
Scoring by quarter: 34–14, 17–16, 27–17, 19–17
Pts: Blatche 21; Rebs: Blatche 10; Asts: Pogoy 6		Pts: Wisnu 11; Rebs: Sitorus 5 Asts: Wuysang 5

Smart Araneta Coliseum, Quezon City
Attendance: 6,063
Referees: Chuang Chih-Chun (TPE), Yuen Chun Yip (HKG), Ting Pick Kieng (MAS)

== Statistical leaders ==
=== Players ===
Points

Pos.	Name	PPG
1	(Myanmar) Aung Wana	16.8
2	(Thailand) Chitchai Ananti	16.3
3	(Philippines) Andray Blatche	14.0
4	(Philippines) Calvin Abueva	13.8
5	(Indonesia) Abraham Grahita	13.2

Rebounds

Pos.	Name	RPG
1	(Vietnam) Nguyễn Văn Hùng	10.2
2	(Singapore) Delvin Goh	8.8
3	(Singapore) Hanbin Ng	8.0
3	(Philippines) Andray Blatche	8.0
5	(Philippines) June Mar Fajardo	7.0
5	(Thailand) Anuruk Lodliang	7.0

Assists

Pos.	Name	APG
1	(Indonesia) Mario Wuysang	5.3
2	(Philippines) Jio Jalalon	5.2
3	(Singapore) Wei Long Wong	4.8
4	(Thailand) Sorot Sunthonsiri	4.5
5	(Philippines) Terrence Romeo	4.3

Steals

Pos.	Name	SPG
1	(Myanmar) Thein Han	3.0
2	(Philippines) Jio Jalalon	2.0
2	(Thailand) Anuruk Lodliang	2.0
4	(Malaysia) Yee Tong Heng	1.8
4	(Myanmar) Thu Tun Tun Sei	1.8
4	(Myanmar) Min Mon Tin	1.8

Blocks

Pos.	Name	BPG
1	(Myanmar) Thein Han	2.3
2	(Malaysia) Kek Thai Chan	2.0
3	(Philippines) Japeth Aguilar	1.8
4	(Thailand) Naratip Boonserm	1.7
5	(Singapore) Delvin Goh	1.6

Other statistical leaders

Stat	Name	Avg.
Field goal percentage	(Thailand) Wutipong Dasom	59.1%
3-point FG percentage	(Philippines) Matthew Wright	54.5%
Free throw percentage	(Thailand) Chitchai Ananti (Singapore) Delvin Goh	83.3%
Turnovers	(Myanmar) Aung Wana	5.0
Fouls	(Malaysia) Kek Thai Chan	3.4

=== Teams ===
Points

Pos.	Name	PPG
1	Philippines	113.0
2	Indonesia	79.3
3	Thailand	71.8
4	Malaysia	64.5
5	Vietnam	62.5

Rebounds

Pos.	Name	RPG
1	Philippines	51.3
2	Thailand	46.8
3	Indonesia	41.8
4	Singapore	40.3
5	Vietnam	39.3

Assists

Pos.	Name	APG
1	Philippines	27.7
2	Indonesia	22.0
3	Thailand	16.0
4	Singapore	15.7
5	Malaysia	13.5

Steals

Pos.	Name	SPG
1	Myanmar	11.5
2	Philippines	10.7
3	Indonesia	10.0
4	Malaysia	8.0
5	Vietnam	7.3

Blocks

Pos.	Name	BPG
1	Philippines	5.5
2	Malaysia	4.5
3	Thailand	4.2
4	Indonesia	3.8
5	Singapore	3.0

Other statistical leaders

Stat	Name	Avg.
Field goal percentage	Philippines	56.3%
3-point FG percentage	Philippines	36.4%
Free throw percentage	Philippines	80.5%
Turnovers	Myanmar	30.8
Fouls	Malaysia	21.5

== Final standings ==
Qualified for: 2017 FIBA Asia Cup; Round 1 of 2019 FIBA Basketball World Cup Asian Qualifiers

Rank	Team
Gold medal	Philippines
Silver medal	Indonesia
Bronze medal	Thailand
4th	Malaysia
5th	Singapore
6th	Vietnam
7th	Myanmar

== Awards ==
2017 Southeast Asian champions

Philippines
Eighth title
