= Myanmar men's national basketball team =

Myanmar national basketball team

Myanmar
- FIBA ranking: NR (13 July 2026)
- Joined FIBA: 1949
- FIBA zone: FIBA Asia
- National federation: Myanmar Basketball Federation

Olympic Games
- Appearances: None

FIBA World Cup
- Appearances: None

FIBA Asia Cup
- Appearances: None
Home	Away

The Myanmar national basketball team represents Myanmar (Burma) in international basketball competitions and is controlled by the Myanmar Basketball Federation.

Myanmar is the world's most populous nation to never qualify for one of the Big Three international basketball competitions. (including the Summer Olympics, FIBA World Cup, Continental Championship)

== Kit ==
=== Manufacturer ===
2017: Air Jordan

== Competitive record ==
2017 Squad

=== Summer Olympics ===
yet to qualify

=== World championships ===
yet to qualify

=== FIBA Asia Cup ===
Year	Position	Pld	W	L
(Philippines) 1960	Did not enter			
(Taiwan) 1963	Did not enter			
(Malaysia) 1965	Did not enter			
(South Korea) 1967	Did not enter			
(Thailand) 1969	Did not enter			
(Japan) 1971	Did not enter			
(Philippines) 1973	Did not enter			
(Thailand) 1975	Did not enter			
(Malaysia) 1977	Did not enter			
(Japan) 1979	Did not enter			
(India) 1981	Did not enter			
(Hong Kong) 1983	Did not enter			
(Malaysia) 1985	Did not enter			
(Thailand) 1987	Did not enter			
(China) 1989	Did not enter			
(Japan) 1991	Did not enter			
(Indonesia) 1993	Did not enter			
(South Korea) 1995	Did not enter			
(Saudi Arabia) 1997	Did not enter			
(Japan) 1999	Did not enter			
(China) 2001	Did not enter			
(China) 2003	Did not enter			
(Qatar) 2005	Did not enter			
(Japan) 2007	Did not enter			
(China) 2009	Did not enter			
(China) 2011	Did not enter			
(Philippines) 2013	Did not enter			
(China) 2015	Did not enter			
(Lebanon) 2017	Did not qualify			
(Indonesia) 2022	Did not enter			
(Saudi Arabia) 2025	Did not enter			
2029	Did not enter			
Total	0/32	0	0	0

=== Asian Games ===
- 1951: 5th (0–5)
- 1954 to 1962: Did not participate
- 1966: 11th (0–6)
- 1970 to 2022: Did not participate

=== Southeast Asian Championship ===
Year	Result	Pld	W	L
(Malaysia) 1994	6th place	?	?	?
(Indonesia) 1996	Did not participate	—		
(Philippines) 1998	Did not participate	—		
(Philippines) 2001	Did not participate	—		
(Malaysia) 2003	Did not participate	—		
(Malaysia) 2005	Did not participate	—		
(Thailand) 2007	Did not participate	—		
(Indonesia) 2009	Did not participate	—		
(Indonesia) 2011	Did not participate	—		
(Indonesia) 2013	Did not participate	—		
(Singapore) 2015	Did not participate	—		
(Philippines) 2017	7th place	6	0	6
Best finish	6th place	6	0	6

=== SEABA Cup ===
yet to participate

=== Southeast Asian Games ===
- 2011: 8th (0–4)
- 2013: 7th (0–6)
- 2015: 8th (1–4)
- 2017: 9th (0–5)
- 2019: 8th (0–4)
- 2021: Did not participate
- 2023: Did not participate
- 2025: 7th

== Roster ==
At the 2019 Southeast Asian Games:

Myanmar National Basketball Team roster
Players
Coaches

Pos.	No.	Name	Age – Date of birth	Height	Club
G	1	JUSTIN	24 – 2 February 1995	1.76 m (5 ft 9 in)
G	2	Htun Wine	23 – 30 November 1996	1.79 m (5 ft 10 in)
C	4	Chin Ta	19 – 1 January 2000	1.90 m (6 ft 3 in)
F	7	Aung Myint	23 – 3 March 1996	1.79 m (5 ft 10 in)
F	9	Wana Aung	24 – 5 March 1995	1.85 m (6 ft 1 in)
F/C	14	Saw Htet Oo	19 – 4 April 2000	1.90 m (6 ft 3 in)
G	20	Laja	32 – 24 January 1987	1.80 m (5 ft 11 in)
F	21	Thant Zaw	21 – 30 October 1998	1.73 m (5 ft 8 in)
G	22	Sei Thu Tun Tun	25 – 4 May 1994	1.79 m (5 ft 10 in)
F	24	Aung Zaya	20 – 17 January 1999	1.87 m (6 ft 2 in)
F	25	Kaung Khant Htut	22 – 10 November 1997	1.80 m (5 ft 11 in)
F/C	99	Phu Dwe Sar	23 – 12 March 1996	1.87 m (6 ft 2 in)

Head coach

- Min Sue Myint

Legend

- (C) Team captain
- Club field describes current pro club
- Age – describes age
  on 10 December 2019

== Past rosters ==
Team for the 2015 Southeast Asian Games:

{{{team}}} roster
Players
Coaches

Pos.	No.	Name	Age – Date of birth	Height	Club
F	5	Yan Wai	15 – 28 September 1999	5 ft 11 in (1.8 m)
PG	7	Myint Aung	19 – 3 March 1996	5 ft 11 in (1.8 m)
PG	9	Justin??	20 – 2 February 1995	5 ft 9 in (1.75 m)
C	10	Tun Zar Ni	36 – 19 July 1978	6 ft 0 in (1.83 m)
F	11	Chan Ah	25 – 14 December 1989	5 ft 11 in (1.8 m)
C	12	Wai Aung Phyo	20 – 29 July 1994	6 ft 0 in (1.83 m)
PG	13	Min Nay Myo	24 – 29 September 1990	5 ft 11 in (1.8 m)
F	14	Oo Aung Kyaw	18 – 1 September 1996	5 ft 11 in (1.8 m)
C	15	Aye Kaung Myat	19 – 20 November 1995	6 ft 5 in (1.96 m)

Head coach

- Win Sein

Assistant coach(es)

- Pyi Htin Lin

Legend

- (C) Team captain
- Club field describes current pro club

At the 2017 SEABA Championship:

Myanmar National Basketball Team roster
Players
Coaches

Pos.	No.	Name	Age – Date of birth	Height	Club	Ctr.
PG	4	Myat Aung	21 – 4 June 1995	5 ft 9 in (1.75 m)
F	7	Phyo Aung	22 – 29 July 1994	6 ft 0 in (1.83 m)
F	8	Zin Wai	20 – 10 September 1996	6 ft 2 in (1.88 m)
F	9	Aung Wana	22 – 5 March 1995	5 ft 11 in (1.8 m)
F	10	Phyo Sai	18 – 12 June 1998	5 ft 11 in (1.8 m)
F	11	Tun Thein	19 – 12 October 1997	5 ft 10 in (1.78 m)
C	15	Thein Han	19 – 20 March 1998	6 ft 2 in (1.88 m)
F	21	Zaw Thant	18 – 30 October 1998	5 ft 10 in (1.78 m)
G	22	Thu Sei	23 – 5 April 1994	5 ft 11 in (1.8 m)
C	24	Aung Zaya	18 – 17 January 1999	6 ft 2 in (1.88 m)
G	26	Min Tin	22 – 1 April 1995	5 ft 11 in (1.8 m)
C	95	Myat Kaung	21 – 20 November 1995	6 ft 5 in (1.96 m)

Head coach

- Win Sein

Assistant coach(es)

- Pyi Htin Lin

Legend

- (C) Team captain
- Club field describes current pro club
- Age – describes age
  on 12 May 2017
