= Wahyu Widayat Jati =

Indonesian basketball coach and former player

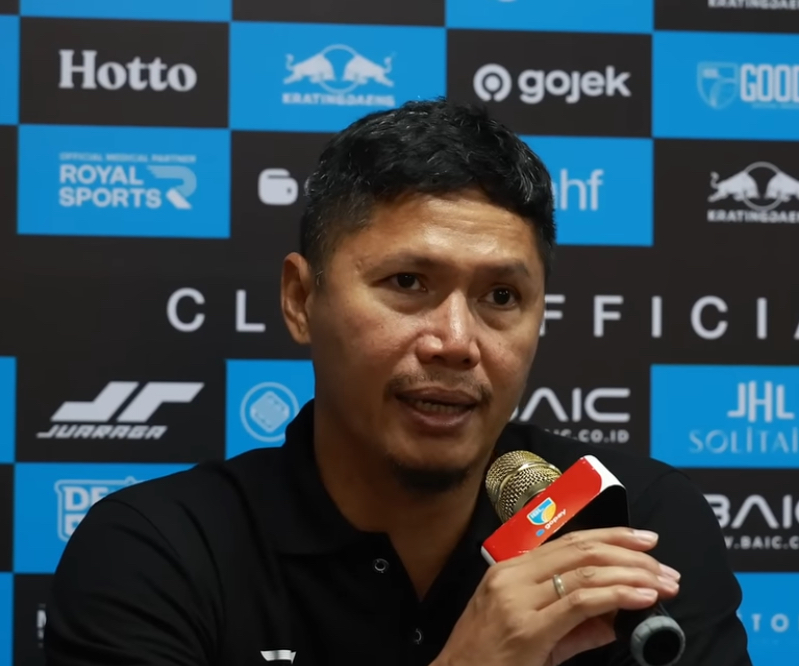
- Wahyu in 2026

Hangtuah Jakarta
- Title: Head coach
- League: IBL

Personal information
- Born: 15 July 1977 (age 49) Magelang, Indonesia
- Listed height: 188 cm (6 ft 2 in)
- Listed weight: 92 kg (203 lb)

Career information
- College: City College of San Francisco
- Playing career: 1995–2015
- Position: Power forward
- Number: 23
- Coaching career: 2015–present

Career history

Playing
- 1995–2009: Satria Muda
- 2012–2014: Aspac Jakarta
- 2014–2015: CLS Knights

Coaching
- 2015: Indonesia women's (assistant coach)
- 2015-2017: CLS Knights
- 2017: Indonesia men's
- 2017-2019: NSH Jakarta
- 2019-2022: Indonesia men's (assistant coach)
- 2023-2024: RANS PIK
- 2024-present: Amartha Hangtuah

Career highlights
- As player: 8× IBL/Kobatama/NBL Indonesia champion (1999, 2004, 2006-2009, 2013, 2014); As head coach: IBL champion (2016); IBL Coach of the Year (2019); IBL All-Star Game head coach (2019)
Medals
Men's basketball
Assistant coach for Indonesia
SEA Games
Gold medal – first place	2021 Hanoi	Team
Men's basketball
Head coach for Indonesia
SEA Games
Silver medal – second place	2017 Kuala Lumpur	Team
Men's basketball
Head coach for Indonesia
SEABA Championship
Silver medal – second place	2017 Philippines	Team
Women's basketball
Assistant coach for Indonesia
SEA Games
Silver medal – second place	2015 Singapore	Team
Men's basketball
Representing Indonesia
Southeast Asian Games
Silver medal – second place	2007 Nakhon Ratchasima	Team

Wahyu Widayat Jati (born 15 July 1977) knicknamed Cacing or Coach Cacing, is an Indonesian basketball coach and former player. He is currently serving as head coach of Hangtuah Jakarta of the Indonesian Basketball League (IBL). He formerly played for the Indonesia national team, and has won eight championships with two different teams in his playing career.

== Professional career ==
Cacing won his first national championship with Satria Muda during the Kobatama era in 1999. This was also the first title for the Satria Muda team. Still with Satria Muda, Cacing earned five more championship rings, this time in the IBL era of 2004, 2006, 2007, 2008, and 2009. He then briefly decided to retire to continue his studies in San Francisco, California. Returning to Indonesia, Cacing returned to play, from 2012 to 2014, but instead of playing for Satria Muda, he played for they're arch-rivals, Aspac Jakarta. He was instrumental in Aspac winning two NBL Indonesia titles. Cacing earned a total of eight national championship rings as a player.

== National team career ==
Cacing was part of the Indonesia national team when they made history by winning the 1996 SEABA Championship in Surabaya. A year later, he was also included in the national team roster for the 1997 SEA Games in Jakarta. After a long absence from the Indonesian national team for the SEA Games, Cacing returned to action at the 2007 SEA Games in Nakhon Ratchasima, Thailand, and won a silver medal.

== Coaching career ==
Cacing won the silver medal at the 2015 SEA Games with the Indonesia women's national basketball team, as an assistant coach to Bambang Asdianto Pribadi, who was the former coach of RANS PIK. He then won a silver medal at the 2017 SEABA Championship as head coach of the men's national team. Cacing was entrusted with managing the men's national team for the 2017 SEA Games, where they successfully won the silver medal in Kuala Lumpur, Malaysia. At that time, the men's national team had Mario Wuysang and Christian Ronaldo Sitepu, and Biboy Enguio. Cacing's highest achievement was winning a gold medal at the 2021 SEA Games as an assistant coach to Miloš Pejić.
