= Thein Han =

Thein Han may refer to:

- Thein Han (basketball)
- Thein Han (painter)
- Thein Han, better known as Zawgyi (writer)
