= Basketball at the 2011 SEA Games =

18th SEA Games Basketball Tournament
- Jakarta 2011

Tournament details
- SEA Games: 2011 SEA Games
- Host nation: Indonesia
- City: Jakarta
- Venue: Kelapa Gading Sports Mall
- Duration: 14–20 November 2011

Men's tournament
- Teams: 8
Medals
Gold medalists	Philippines
Silver medalists	Thailand
Bronze medalists	Indonesia

Women's tournament
- Teams: 5
Medals
Gold medalists	Thailand
Silver medalists	Philippines
Bronze medalists	Malaysia

Tournaments
← Nakhon Ratchasima 2007	Naypyidaw 2013 →

The basketball tournament at the 2011 SEA Games took place from 14 to 20 November 2011. This edition of the tournament featured both men's and women's tournament. All matches took place at Kelapa Gading Sports Mall in Jakarta.

== Men's tournament ==
All times are Western Indonesian Time (WIB) – UTC+7.

The Philippines, which sent an all-amateur team, topped Group A by beating Thailand 103–69 to give the Thais their first loss in the tournament, although both teams qualified to the semifinals. On Group B, hosts Indonesia eliminated Singapore from contention by five points, to top the group. In the semifinals, Malaysia trailed by three points at halftime, but the Philippines pulled away at the second half to secure a berth for the gold medal game. In the other semifinal, Thailand outscored Indonesia 22–10 in the fourth quarter to eliminate the hosts from the tournament, giving the Indonesians their first loss.

The Philippines won the gold medal without losing a game, beating Thailand in the final, 85–57.

=== Group stage ===
==== Group A ====
Pos	Team	Pld	W	L	PF	PA	PD	Pts	Qualification
1	Philippines	3	3	0	337	190	+147	6	Advance to knockout round
2	Thailand	3	2	1	239	219	+20	5	Advance to knockout round
3	Vietnam	3	1	2	185	249	−64	4	Qualification to 5th place match
4	Cambodia	3	0	3	187	290	−103	3	Qualification to 7th place match

Rules for classification: (1) Tournament points, (2) Head-to-head tournament points, (3) Head-to-head goal average, (4) Overall goal average, (5) Drawing of lots

November 14
09:00

Report

Thailand	85–54	Vietnam
Scoring by quarter: 20-13, 30-9, 18-14, 17-18
Pts: Lertmalaiporn 14; Rebs: Ghogar 8 Asts: Apiromvilaichai, Jantuma 3		Pts: Lai, Triệu 10; Rebs: Lê 4 Asts: Nguyen, Triệu

Kelapa Gading Sports Mall, Jakarta
Referees: Cheuk Fai Lau, Yun Aun Chong, Donald Francis Quinn

November 14
11:00

Report

Philippines	127–68	Cambodia
Scoring by quarter: 35-20, 26-19, 32-17, 34-12
Pts: Ravena 17; Rebs: Marcelo, Salva 6 Asts: 3 players 4		Pts: Pek, Sophoeun 24; Rebs: Sophoeun 7 Asts: Boroth 6

Kelapa Gading Sports Mall, Jakarta
Referees: Jamal Al Turk, Harja Jaladri, Linn Maung

November 15
13:00

Report

Cambodia	62–85	Thailand
Scoring by quarter: 14-19, 15-19, 15-29, 18-18
Pts: Sophoeun 28; Rebs: Boroth 15; Asts: Pek, Boroth 2		Pts: Kruatiwa 15; Rebs: Klahan 14; Asts: Apiromvilaichai, Ghogar 3

Kelapa Gading Sports Mall, Jakarta
Referees: Yuji Higashi, Lukmanul Lubay, Naing Phyo Win

November 15
15:00

Report

Vietnam	53–107	Philippines
Scoring by quarter: 4-32, 19-27, 18-25, 12-23
Pts: Nguyen 11; Rebs: Vu 5 Asts: Triệu, Vu 2		Pts: Slaughter 20; Rebs: Marcelo 10; Asts: Monfort 5

Kelapa Gading Sports Mall, Jakarta
Referees: Sedyo Mukti Wibowo, Poh Seng Goh, Yong Sern Tee

November 16
09:00

Report

Cambodia	57–78	Vietnam
Scoring by quarter: 10-21, 18-17, 13-20, 16-20
Pts: Sophoeun 25; Rebs: Sophoeun 14; Asts: Pek, Kim 1		Pts: Triệu 19; Rebs: Nguyen 10; Asts: Du 3

Kelapa Gading Sports Mall, Jakarta
Referees: Atanu Banerjee, Linn Maung, Harja Jaladri

November 16
11:00

Report

Thailand	69–103	Philippines
Scoring by quarter: 21-37, 13-17, 15-21, 20-28
Pts: Apiromvilaichai 12; Rebs: Kaedum 5 Asts: 3 players 2		Pts: Hodge 15; Rebs: Salva, Ravena 4 Asts: Ravena 5

Kelapa Gading Sports Mall, Jakarta
Referees: Cheuk Fai Lau, Sedyo Mukti Wibowo, Yun Aun Chong

==== Group B ====
Pos	Team	Pld	W	L	PF	PA	PD	Pts	Qualification
1	Indonesia (H)	3	3	0	223	165	+58	6	Advance to knockout round
2	Malaysia	3	2	1	212	190	+22	5	Advance to knockout round
3	Singapore	3	1	2	225	221	+4	4	Qualification to 5th place match
4	Myanmar	3	0	3	191	275	−84	3	Qualification to 7th place match

Rules for classification: (1) Tournament points, (2) Head-to-head tournament points, (3) Head-to-head goal average, (4) Overall goal average, (5) Drawing of lots
(H) Hosts

November 14
17:00

Report

Singapore	59–67	Malaysia
Scoring by quarter: 17-19, 14-12, 16-19, 12-17
Pts: Wong W.L. 17; Rebs: Matialakan 9 Asts: Oh 6		Pts: Guganeswaran 18; Rebs: Guganeswaran 5 Asts: Ooi B.S. 4

Kelapa Gading Sports Mall, Jakarta
Referees: Yuji Higashi, Ricor Buaron, Viet Duc Le

November 14
19:00

Report

Indonesia	84–45	Myanmar
Scoring by quarter: 23-15, 20-11, 21-6, 20-13
Pts: Prihantono 18; Rebs: Sitepu 12; Asts: 3 players 4		Pts: Phay 12; Rebs: Cho 14; Asts: Kyi, Cho 2

Kelapa Gading Sports Mall, Jakarta
Referees: Atanu Banerjee, Dumrongkiat Mungmit, Glenn Cornelio

November 15
17:00

Report

Myanmar	74–91	Singapore
Scoring by quarter: 15-15, 12-31, 24-26, 23-19
Pts: Chan 24; Rebs: Chan, Cho 10; Asts: Chan 3		Pts: Koh M.K. 25; Rebs: Khoo 10; Asts: Wong S.Y. 7

Kelapa Gading Sports Mall, Jakarta
Referees: Cheuk Fai Lau, Viet Duc Le, Dumrongkiat Mungmit

November 15
19:00

Report

Malaysia	45–59	Indonesia
Scoring by quarter: 9-15, 8-24, 16-9, 12-11
Pts: Wong C.H. 12; Rebs: Ooi B.S. 9 Asts: 4 players 1		Pts: Prihantono 12; Rebs: Poedjakesuma 11; Asts: Wuysang 5

Kelapa Gading Sports Mall, Jakarta
Referees: Jamal Al Turk, Atanu Banerjee, Ricor Buaron

November 16
17:00

Report

Malaysia	100–72	Myanmar
Scoring by quarter: 24-16, 25-20, 30-18, 21-18
Pts: Wee C.C. 20; Rebs: Ng 9 Asts: Wee C.C. 6		Pts: Gyi 20; Rebs: Phay 9 Asts: Gyi 2

Kelapa Gading Sports Mall, Jakarta
Referees: Jamal Al Turk, Glenn Cornelio, Viet Duc Le

November 16
19:00

Indonesia	80–75	Singapore
Scoring by quarter: 16-22, 16-20, 22-17, 26-16
Pts: Gunawan 23; Rebs: Sitepu 10; Asts: Wuysang 5		Pts: Koh M.K., Matialakan 17; Rebs: Khoo, Matialakan 7 Asts: Oh 5

Kelapa Gading Sports Mall, Jakarta
Referees: Yuji Higashi, Dumrongkiat Mungmit, Ricor Buaron

=== Knockout stage ===
Semi-finals
November 18
Philippines	103
Malaysia	74
November 18
Indonesia	62
Thailand	65

Final
November 20
Philippines	85
Thailand	57
Third place
November 20
Malaysia	54
Indonesia	78

==== 7th place play-off ====
November 18
09:00

Report

Cambodia	84–80	Myanmar
Scoring by quarter: 28-22, 15-12, 20-24, 21-22
Pts: Sophoeun 34; Rebs: Sophoeun 21; Asts: Pek 4		Pts: Chan 21; Rebs: Cho 14; Asts: Gyi, Kyi 3

Kelapa Gading Sports Mall, Jakarta
Referees: Dumrongkiat Mungmit, Glenn Cornelio, Lukmanul Lubay

==== 5th place play-off ====
November 19
19:00

Report

Vietnam	48–91	Singapore
Scoring by quarter: 12-24, 14-24, 11-22, 11-21
Pts: Nguyen 11; Rebs: Nguyen, Duong 5 Asts: Triệu, Vu 1		Pts: Oh 15; Rebs: Goh K.C.D. 10; Asts: Oh 4

Kelapa Gading Sports Mall, Jakarta
Referees: Cheuk Fai Lau, Naing Phyo Win, Sedyo Mukti Wibowo

==== Semi-finals ====
November 18
15:00

Report

Philippines	103–74	Malaysia
Scoring by quarter: 23-19, 22-21, 29-19, 30-15
Pts: Slaughter 16; Rebs: Garcia 6 Asts: Tiu 6		Pts: Guganeswaran 24; Rebs: Kwaan Y.J. 7 Asts: Ooi B.S. 3

Kelapa Gading Sports Mall, Jakarta
Referees: Cheuk Fai Lau, Yuji Higashi, Poh Seng Goh

November 18
19:00

Report

Indonesia	62–65	Thailand
Scoring by quarter: 13-10, 18-20, 21-13, 10-22
Pts: Poedjakesuma 26; Rebs: Gunawan 7 Asts: Wuysang 4		Pts: Lertmalaiporn 16; Rebs: Ghogar 6 Asts: Klahan 2

Kelapa Gading Sports Mall, Jakarta
Referees: Jamal Al Turk, Atanu Banerjee, Viet Duc Le

==== Bronze medal match ====
November 20
17:00

Report

Malaysia	54–78	Indonesia
Scoring by quarter: 12-25, 18-14, 18-22, 6-17
Pts: Chee L.W. 14; Rebs: Loh S.F., Kwaan Y.J. 5 Asts: Wee C.C., Chee L.W. 2		Pts: Gunawan 16; Rebs: Gunawan 14; Asts: Prihantono 4

Kelapa Gading Sports Mall, Jakarta
Referees: Yuji Higashi, Cheuk Fai Lau, Ricor Buaron

==== Gold medal match ====
November 20
19:00

Report

Philippines	85–57	Thailand
Scoring by quarter: 21-17, 23-8, 17-17, 24-15
Pts: Slaughter 16; Rebs: Slaughter 8 Asts: Parks 6		Pts: Kaedum 17; Rebs: Apiromvilaichai 6 Asts: 5 players 1

Kelapa Gading Sports Mall, Jakarta
Referees: Jamal Al Turk, Atanu Banerjee, Donald Francis Quinn

== Women's tournament ==
All times are Western Indonesian Time (WIB) – UTC+7.

Team	Pld	W	L	PF	PA	PD	Pts	Tie
Thailand	4	3	1	280	265	+15	7	1–0
Philippines	4	3	1	267	238	+29	7	0–1
Malaysia	4	2	2	259	238	+21	6	1–0
Myanmar	4	2	2	254	279	−25	6	0–1
Indonesia	4	0	4	250	290	−40	4	

November 14
13:00

Report

Malaysia	56–64	Philippines
Scoring by quarter: 6-21, 22-15, 10-15, 18-13
Pts: Rajintiran 12; Rebs: Pang H.P., Rajintiran 5 Asts: Teo W.Y., Kew S.M. 2		Pts: Arayi 16; Rebs: Arayi 13; Asts: Arayi 5

Kelapa Gading Sports Mall, Jakarta
Referees: Ling Peng, Yoko Tomita, Poh Seng Goh

November 14
15:00

Report

Indonesia	78–86	Myanmar
Scoring by quarter: 21-24, 21-12, 13-30, 23-20
Pts: Ibo 24; Rebs: 3 players 6 Asts: Ningrum 5		Pts: Wine 32; Rebs: Yee 18; Asts: 3 players 2

Kelapa Gading Sports Mall, Jakarta
Referees: Si Man Lei, Watcharin Padungratchadakit, Yong Sern Tee

November 15
09:00

Report

Thailand	61–56	Indonesia
Scoring by quarter: 15-15, 22-10, 18-16, 6-15
Pts: Jantakan 17; Rebs: Banmoo 7 Asts: Mathuros 4		Pts: Ibo 14; Rebs: Ibo 7 Asts: Ningrum 3

Kelapa Gading Sports Mall, Jakarta
Referees: Yoko Tomita, Si Man Lei, Yun Aun Chong

November 15
11:00

Report

Myanmar	52–74	Malaysia
Scoring by quarter: 15-11, 18-20, 6-17, 13-26
Pts: Susie 22; Rebs: Yee 11; Asts: Wine 6		Pts: Rajintiran 19; Rebs: Kew S.M. 9 Asts: Yong S.M. 6

Kelapa Gading Sports Mall, Jakarta
Referees: Ling Peng, Ibnu Susilo, Watcharin Padungratchadakit

November 16
13:00

Report

Philippines	57–39	Myanmar
Scoring by quarter: 18-10, 8-13, 17-6, 14-10
Pts: Arayi 13; Rebs: Almazan 11; Asts: Borja 3		Pts: Yee 10; Rebs: Susie 9 Asts: Susie 2

Kelapa Gading Sports Mall, Jakarta
Referees: Yoko Tomita, Yong Sern Tee, Donald Francis Quinn

November 16
15:00

Report

Malaysia	59–74	Thailand
Scoring by quarter: 16-13, 13-15, 22-25, 8-21
Pts: Goh B.F. 18; Rebs: Pang H.P. 4 Asts: Pang H.P., Lee S.F. 2		Pts: Jantakan, Banmoo 18; Rebs: Banmoo 9 Asts: Jantakan 7

Kelapa Gading Sports Mall, Jakarta
Referees: Si Man Lei, Ling Peng, Poh Seng Goh

November 18
13:00

Report

Thailand	75–73 (OT)	Philippines
Scoring by quarter: 15-16, 23-13, 12-18, 14-17, Overtime: 11-9
Pts: Banmoo 19; Rebs: Chamnarnwaree, Mathuros 9 Asts: Jantakan 4		Pts: Arayi 18; Rebs: Almazan 13; Asts: Grajales 3

Kelapa Gading Sports Mall, Jakarta
Referees: Ling Peng, Donald Francis Quinn, Linn Maung

November 18
17:00

Report

Indonesia	48–70	Malaysia
Scoring by quarter: 10-17, 17-10, 15-19, 6-24
Pts: Ningrum 12; Rebs: Ibo 12; Asts: Christaline 2		Pts: Pang H.P. 14; Rebs: Yap C.Y. 12; Asts: Yaakob 5

Kelapa Gading Sports Mall, Jakarta
Referees: Si Man Lei, Yoko Tomita, Watcharin Padungratchadakit

November 19
15:00

Report

Philippines	73–68	Indonesia
Scoring by quarter: 11-23, 21-9, 23-16, 18-20
Pts: Arayi 14; Rebs: Almazan 9 Asts: Grajales 7		Pts: Ningrum 26; Rebs: Ibo 9 Asts: Ibo 4

Kelapa Gading Sports Mall, Jakarta
Referees: Atanu Banerjee, Ling Peng, Yoko Tomita

November 19
17:00

Report

Myanmar	77–70	Thailand
Scoring by quarter: 15-13, 11-16, 30-12, 21-29
Pts: Wine 22; Rebs: Yee 12; Asts: Wine 5		Pts: Jantakan 28; Rebs: Mathuros 11; Asts: Jantakan 5

Kelapa Gading Sports Mall, Jakarta
Referees: Si Man Lei, Poh Seng Goh, Glenn Cornelio

== Medal summary ==
=== Medal tally ===
Rank	Nation	Gold	Silver	Bronze	Total
1	Philippines	1	1	0	2
1	Thailand	1	1	0	2
3	Indonesia	0	0	1	1
3	Malaysia	0	0	1	1
Totals (4 entries)		2	2	2	6

=== Medalists ===
==== Men's tournament ====
Med
NOC/Names
Med
NOC/Names
Med
NOC/Names

Philippines

Thailand

Indonesia

Bobby Ray Parks Jr.
Chris Ellis
Chris Tiu
Cliff Hodge
Dave Marcelo
Jake Pascual
Emman Monfort
Garvo Lanete
Greg Slaughter
Kiefer Ravena
Nico Salva
RR Garcia

Attaporn Lertmalaiporn
Boonchai Rittiphanyawong
Chaiwat Kaedum
Chanachon Klahan
Danai Kongkum
Darongpan Apiromvilaichai
Darunpong Apiromvilaichai
Mana Jantuma
Ratdech Kruatiwa
Sukhdave Ghogar
Supachai Sangthong
Wutipong Dasom

Amin Prihantono
Andi Poedjakesuma
Ary Chandra
Christian Ronald Sitepu
Dimas Aryo Dewanto
Dwi Haryoko
Faisal Julius Achmad
Mario Wuysang
Ponsianus Nyoman Indrawan
Rony Gunawan
Welyanson Situmora
Xaverius Prawiro

==== Women's tournament ====
Med
NOC/Names
Med
NOC/Names
Med
NOC/Names

Thailand

Philippines

Malaysia

Atchara Kaichaiyap
Chalisa Chamnarnwa
Charothai Suksomwo
Chonticha Chirdpet
Juthamas Jantakan
Juthathip Mathuros
Naruemol Banmoo
Nipa Sangkhum
Nomjit Tunsaw
Penphan Yothanan
Supane Ludrodkij
Wipaporn Saechua

Analyn Almazan
Anna Katrina Pineda
Aurora Adriano
Bernadette Mercado
Chovi Borja
Diana Rose Jose
Joan Grajales
Karen Lomogda
Maria Lalaine Flores
Marites Gadian
Melissa Jacob
Merenciana Ewon Arayi
Treena Anne Therese Limgenco

Ang Siew Teng
Choo Sook Ping
Eugene Ting Chiao
Goh Beng Fong
Hee Shook Ying
Kalaimathi Rajinti
Kew Suik May
Lee Siew Fun
Nur Izzati Binti Yaakob
Pang Hui Pin
Saw Wei Yin
Teo Woon Yuen
Yap Ching Yee
Yong Shin Min

Preceded by 2007 (not held on 2009)	Basketball at the SEA Games; 2011	Succeeded by 2013
