= Kevin Sitorus =

Indonesian basketball player

Personal information
- Born: 17 July 1994 (age 32) Kuala Kapuas, Central Kalimantan, Indonesia
- Listed height: 196 cm (6 ft 5 in)
- Listed weight: 88 kg (194 lb)

Career information
- High school: Kanaan (Banjarmasin, South Kalimantan)
- College: Krida Wacana Christian (2012-2016)
- Playing career: 2012–2022
- Position: Power forward

Career history
- 2012–2022: Satria Muda Pertamina Jakarta

Career highlights
- 2× IBL champion (2018, 2020); NBL Indonesia champion (2015)
Medals
Men's basketball
Representing Indonesia
SEABA Championship
| Silver medal – second place | 2017 Manila | Team |
SEA Games
| Silver medal – second place | 2017 Kuala Lumpur | Team |
SEABA Under-18 Championship
| Silver medal – second place | 2012 Singapore | Team |
ASEAN University Games
| Gold medal – first place | 2016 Singapore | Team |

Kevin Yonas Argadiba Sitorus (born 17 July 1994) is a former Indonesian professional basketball player for the Satria Muda Pertamina Jakarta club of the Indonesian Basketball League. He represented Indonesia's national basketball team at the 2017 SEABA Championship in Quezon City, Philippines.

== Career statistics ==
=== NBL/IBL ===
==== Regular season ====
| Year | Team | GP | MPG | FG% | 3P% | FT% | RPG | APG | SPG | BPG | PPG |
|---|---|---|---|---|---|---|---|---|---|---|---|
| 2012-13 | Satria Muda Pertamina | 32 | - | 43% | 22% | 66% | 2.6 | 0.7 | 1.2 | 0.4 | 4.4 |
| 2013-14 | Satria Muda Pertamina | 22 | - | 42% | 33% | 67% | 3.5 | 0.5 | 1.2 | 0.4 | 6.1 |
| 2014-15 | Satria Muda Pertamina | 30 | - | 44% | 12% | 73% | 3.8 | 1.2 | 1.0 | 0.3 | 6.9 |
| 2015-16 | Satria Muda Pertamina | 30 | 20.5 | 46% | 10% | 63% | 4.6 | 1.1 | 1.2 | 0.5 | 7.2 |
| 2016-17 | Satria Muda Pertamina | 9 | 20.6 | 40% | 0% | 50% | 6.3 | 1.2 | 1.2 | 0.2 | 4.7 |
| 2017-18 | Satria Muda Pertamina | 15 | 16.2 | 46% | 33% | 46% | 3.0 | 1.2 | 1.0 | 0.0 | 5.2 |
| 2018-19 | Satria Muda Pertamina | 18 | 19.0 | 47% | 38% | 67% | 3.3 | 1.2 | 0.6 | 0.2 | 5.3 |
| 2019-20 | Indonesia Patriots | 12 | 10.5 | 39% | 23% | 72% | 1.9 | 0.5 | 0.4 | 0.0 | 2.5 |
| 2020-21 | Satria Muda Pertamina | 16 | 17.8 | 39.3 | 20% | 62.3 | 4.2 | 0.6 | 0.6 | 0.3 | 6.0 |
| 2020-21 | Satria Muda Pertamina | 15 | 13.2 | 37.6 | 50.0 | 20.0 | 2.2 | 0.4 | 0.3 | 0.2 | 3.2 |

==== Playoffs ====
| Year | Team | GP | MPG | FG% | 3P% | FT% | RPG | APG | SPG | BPG | PPG |
|---|---|---|---|---|---|---|---|---|---|---|---|
| 2013 | Satria Muda | 2 | - | 12% | 0% | 100% | 2.5 | 0.5 | 0.0 | 0.0 | 2.0 |
| 2014 | Satria Muda | 0 | - | - | - | - | - | - | - | - | - |
| 2015 | Satria Muda | 4 | - | 43% | 0% | 63% | 10.0 | 1.0 | 1.8 | 0.0 | 10.5 |
| 2016 | Satria Muda | 4 | 28.35 | 39% | 50% | 57% | 6.5 | 1.0 | 1.2 | 1.0 | 8.2 |
| 2017 | Satria Muda | 5 | 20.44 | 40% | 44% | 83% | 3.2 | 0.4 | 1.2 | 0.2 | 8.2 |
| 2018 | Satria Muda | 5 | 15.54 | 32% | 38% | 50% | 1.2 | 1.0 | 1.0 | 0.0 | 4.4 |

=== International ===
| Year | Competition | GP | MPG | FG% | 3P% | FT% | RPG | APG | SPG | BPG | PPG |
|---|---|---|---|---|---|---|---|---|---|---|---|
| 2017 | Southeast Asia Basketball Association Championship | 6 | 25.7 | 41.9% | 33.3% | 0.00% | 6.5 | 0.8 | 0.3 | 0.2 | 6.0 |
