= 2012 SEABA Cup =

2012 SEABA Stanković Cup
3rd Stanković Qualifying

Tournament details
- Host country: Thailand
- Dates: July 3 – July 7
- Teams: 5
- Venue(s): 1 (in 1 host city)

Final positions
- Champions: Philippines (1st title)

Tournament statistics
- Top scorer: (Indonesia) Wisnu (18.0)
- Top rebounds: (Indonesia) Gunawan (10.0)
- Top assists: (Philippines) Tiu (5.3)
- PPG (Team): Philippines (83.8)
- RPG (Team): Philippines (39.3)
- APG (Team): Philippines (20.8)

The 2012 SEABA Cup is the qualifying event in the SEABA for the 2012 FIBA Asia Cup. The games were held from July 3 to July 7 in Chiang Mai, Thailand. The Philippines swept all of their assignments to clinch the lone spot for SEABA region.

== Round robin ==
Qualified for the 2012 FIBA Asia Cup

Team	Pld	W	L	PF	PA	PD	Head-to-Head
Philippines	4	4	0	335	212	+123	
Indonesia	4	2	2	233	247	-14	1-0
Thailand	4	2	2	238	274	-36	0-1
Singapore	4	1	3	253	303	-50	1-0
Malaysia	4	1	3	267	290	-23	0-1

July 3
14:00

Box Scores

Malaysia	70–50	Indonesia
Scoring by quarter: 17–12, 16–12, 23–15, 14–11
Pts: Kwaan Y.J. 21; Rebs: Kwaan Y.J. 9 Asts: Tong W.K., Chin Z.S. 3		Pts: Wisnu 27; Rebs: Susanto 7 Asts: 4 players 1

700th Anniversary Stadium, Chiang Mai
Referees: Dennis Barbacena, Teerapong Yodsint, Wiwat Jittapalakul

July 3
16:00

Box Scores

Thailand	67–62	Singapore
Scoring by quarter: 18-20, 17-8, 13-22, 19-12
Pts: Kaedum 18; Rebs: Dasom, Ghogar 8 Asts: Suthap 3		Pts: Wong W.L. 6 Rebs: Folkoff 5 Asts: Wong W.L. 4

700th Anniversary Stadium, Chiang Mai
Referees: Cheuk Fai Lau, Kok Yew Ho, Harya Jaladri

July 4
14:00

Box Scores

Singapore	58–96	Philippines
Scoring by quarter: 12–22, 8–23, 23–29, 15–22
Pts: Folkoff 12; Rebs: Khoo 5 Asts: Liew 3		Pts: Douthit 21; Rebs: Douthit, Ramos 7 Asts: Tiu 5

700th Anniversary Stadium, Chiang Mai
Referees: Kok Yew Ho, Harya Jaladri, Thongcai Thaweewutsophon

July 4
16:00

Box Scores

Thailand	73–72	Malaysia
Scoring by quarter: 15-20, 16-15, 26-20, 16-17
Pts: Klahan 17; Rebs: Dasom, Sangthong 6 Asts: Samerjai 6		Pts: Loh S.F. 17; Rebs: Kwaan Y.J. 9 Asts: Chin Z.S. 3

700th Anniversary Stadium, Chiang Mai
Referees: Cheuk Fai Lau, Dennis Barbacena, Victor Min De Mah

July 5
14:00

Box Scores

Malaysia	75–82	Singapore
Scoring by quarter: 19–21, 17–13, 12–22, 27–26
Pts: Chin Z.S. 17; Rebs: Kwaan Y.J. 9 Asts: Tong W.K. 4		Pts: Oh 18; Rebs: Matialakan 7 Asts: Oh, Folkoff 4

700th Anniversary Stadium, Chiang Mai
Referees: Cheuk Fai Lau, Harya Jaladri, Nattapong Jontapa

July 5
16:00

Box Scores

Indonesia	52–80	Philippines
Scoring by quarter: 8-21, 17-20, 12-18, 15-21
Pts: Ahmad, Sitepu 13; Rebs: Gunawan 11; Asts: Ahmad 4		Pts: Baracael 15; Rebs: Douthit 7 Asts: Monfort 7

700th Anniversary Stadium, Chiang Mai
Referees: Kok Yew Ho, Victor Min De Mah, Teerapong Yodsint

July 6
14:00

Box Scores

Philippines	85–50	Malaysia
Scoring by quarter: 15–8, 28–8, 22–12, 20–22
Pts: Lanete 14; Rebs: Douthit 10; Asts: Tiu 9		Pts: Choo W.H. 8 Rebs: Ng K.K., Kuek T.Y. 5 Asts: Loh S.F. 3

700th Anniversary Stadium, Chiang Mai
Referees: Cheuk Fai Lau, Thongcai Thaweewutsophon, Harya Jaladri

July 6
16:00

Box Scores

Indonesia	66–46	Thailand
Scoring by quarter: 17-17, 15-12, 21-7, 13-10
Pts: Wisnu 24; Rebs: Gunawan, Sitepu 12; Asts: Ahmad, Wisnu 3		Pts: Dasom 9 Rebs: Klahan 6 Asts: Samerjai 3

700th Anniversary Stadium, Chiang Mai
Referees: Kok Yew Ho, Dennis Barbacena, Victor Min De Mah

July 7
14:00

Box Scores

Singapore	51–65	Indonesia
Scoring by quarter: 12–9, 10–11, 13–29, 16–16
Pts: Matialakan 16; Rebs: Matialakan 9 Asts: Folkoff 5		Pts: Ahmad 16; Rebs: Gunawan 13; Asts: Michel 2

700th Anniversary Stadium, Chiang Mai
Referees: Kok Yew Ho, Nattapong Jontapa, Dennis Barbacena

July 7
16:00

Box Scores

Thailand	52–74	Philippines
Scoring by quarter: 8-22, 7-19, 17-16, 20-17
Pts: Dasom 16; Rebs: Ghogar 7 Asts: Samerjai 3		Pts: Douthit 17; Rebs: Douthit 11; Asts: Tenorio 7

700th Anniversary Stadium, Chiang Mai
Referees: Cheuk Fai Lau, Harya Jaladri, Victor Min De Mah

== Final standings ==
Rank	Team
Gold medal	Philippines
Silver medal	Indonesia
Bronze medal	Thailand
4	Singapore
5	Malaysia

== Awards ==
2012 SEABA Cup champions

Philippines
First title
