= Christian Ronaldo =

Christian Ronaldo may refer to:

- Christian Ronaldo Sitepu (born 1986), an Indonesian basketball player
- Cristiano Ronaldo, Portuguese professional footballer
