= 2014 SEABA Cup =

2014 SEABA Stanković Cup
4th Stanković Qualifying
- Official logo of the 2014 SEABA Cup

Tournament details
- Host country: Indonesia
- Dates: May 21–23
- Teams: 3 (from 10 federations)
- Venue: 1 (in 1 host city)

Final positions
- Champions: Singapore (1st title)

Tournament statistics
- Top scorer: (Singapore) Wong W.L. (19.0)
- Top rebounds: (Singapore) Low (11.0)
- Top assists: (Indonesia) Prastawa (4.5) (Malaysia) Tong W.K.
- PPG (Team): Singapore (70.5)
- RPG (Team): Singapore (46.0)
- APG (Team): Indonesia (17.5)

The 2014 SEABA Cup was the qualifying event in the SEABA subzone for the 2014 FIBA Asia Cup. The games were held from May 21 to 23 in Batam, Riau Islands Province, in Indonesia.

Automatically, only one spot is allotted for SEABA but due to the Philippines' runner-up finish in the 2013 FIBA Asia Championship, the subzone was awarded another slot, thus SEABA will now have two spots which will be contested by three SEABA teams.

Singapore won their first international title ever after posting their second win in as many games in the three-game round-robin tournament to clinch the title in the 2014 SEABA Cup. Singapore and hosts Indonesia represented SEABA subzone in the 2014 FIBA Asia Cup, along with the Philippines that was invited as a wildcard after the Gulf subzone representative withdrew from the competition.

== Round robin ==
Team	Pld	W	L	PF	PA	PD	Pts
Singapore	2	2	0	141	123	+18	4
Indonesia	2	1	1	134	130	+4	3
Malaysia	2	0	2	119	141	–22	2

Qualified for the 2014 FIBA Asia Cup

May 21
20:00

Live Stats

Indonesia	62–72	Singapore
Scoring by quarter: 12–21, 16–17, 14–16, 20–18
Pts: Regowo 18; Rebs: Thoyib 10; Asts: Prastawa, Jati 3		Pts: Wong W.L. 21; Rebs: Low 13; Asts: Wong W.L. 5

Hi-Test Arena, Batam
Referees: Fong Kin Lung (HKG), Samphan Kamphusiriphan (THA), Chang Yee Chuan (MAS)

May 22
19:00

Live Stats

Singapore	69–61	Malaysia
Scoring by quarter: 12–14, 12–15, 18–12, 27–20
Pts: Wong W.L. 17; Rebs: Wong W.L., Low 9 Asts: Liew 5		Pts: Koh W.T. 13; Rebs: Koh W.T. 8 Asts: Tong W.K. 7

Hi-Test Arena, Batam
Referees: Samphan Kamphusiriphan (THA), Fong Kin Lung (HKG), Donald Francis Quinn (INA)

May 23
19:00

Live Stats

Malaysia	58–72	Indonesia
Scoring by quarter: 8–15, 14–19, 18–24, 18–14
Pts: Koh W.T. 14; Rebs: Ooi B.S., Kuek T.Y., Koh W.T. 5 Asts: Ooi B.S., Koh W.T. 3		Pts: Enguio 18; Rebs: Regowo 9 Asts: Prastawa 6

Hi-Test Arena, Batam
Referees: Fong Kin Lung (HKG), Samphan Kamphusiriphan (THA), Victor Min de Mah (SIN)

== Final standings ==
Rank	Team
Gold medal	Singapore
Silver medal	Indonesia
Bronze medal	Malaysia

== Awards ==
2014 SEABA Cup champions

Singapore
First title
