= Indonesia men's national basketball team =

Indonesian basketball team

Indonesia
- FIBA ranking: 92 ▲2 (1 September 2026)
- Joined FIBA: 1953
- FIBA zone: FIBA Asia
- National federation: PERBASI
- Coach: David Singleton

Asia Cup
- Appearances: 18
- Medals: None

SEABA Championship
- Appearances: 10
- Medals: Gold: 1996; Silver: 2005, 2007, 2009, 2011, 2017; Bronze: 1994
Home	Away
Medal record
SEABA Championship
Gold medal – first place	1996 Surabaya	Team
Silver medal – second place	2005 Kuala Lumpur	Team
Silver medal – second place	2007 Ratchaburi	Team
Silver medal – second place	2009 Medan	Team
Silver medal – second place	2011 Jakarta	Team
Silver medal – second place	2017 Quezon City	Team
Bronze medal – third place	1994 Segamat	Team
SEABA Cup
Silver medal – second place	2012 Chiang Mai	Team
Silver medal – second place	2014 Batam	Team
SEA Games
Gold medal – first place	2021 Hanoi	Team
Silver medal – second place	2001 Kuala Lumpur	Team
Silver medal – second place	2007 Nakhon Ratchasima	Team
Silver medal – second place	2015 Singapore	Team
Silver medal – second place	2017 Kuala Lumpur	Team
Bronze medal – third place	1993 Singapore	Team
Bronze medal – third place	1999 Bandar Seri Begawan	Team
Bronze medal – third place	2011 Jakarta and Palembang	Team
Bronze medal – third place	2025 Bangkok	Team

The Indonesia men's national basketball team (Indonesian: Tim bola basket nasional putra Indonesia) represents the Republic of Indonesia in international basketball competitions. The governing body of the team is the Indonesian Basketball Association (Indonesian: Persatuan Bola Basket Seluruh Indonesia, PERBASI).

Its biggest success was the gold medal at the 1996 South East Asian Championship. Team Indonesia is one of the major teams in Southeast Asia. The team finished among the top-four teams in Asia at the 1967 Asian Basketball Championship. At the 1996 SEABA Championship, Indonesia was the dominant country and won the gold medal. At the 1997 SEA Games in Jakarta, Indonesia failed to get a medal. Then, two years later Indonesia won the bronze medal at the Brunei 1999 SEA Games.

Indonesia participated at the 2009 FIBA Asia Championship as well, which was held 6–16 August 2009, in Tianjin, China. They were able to qualify for the said tournament by placing second in the 2009 SEABA Championship held from 6–9 June 2009. At the FIBA Asia Championship, only the top 3 qualified for the World Basketball Championships. For these events, the head coach of the team was Rastafari Horongbala. At the FIBA Asia Championship 2009, Indonesia finished 15th, leaving behind Sri Lanka. On individual performances, Kelly Purwanto and Isman Thoyib finished among the tournament's top performers. Purwanto finished in the top ten in steals per game, Thoyib finished in the top ten in blocks per game. Indonesian basketball-icon Mario Wuysang was not able to represent his country at that event due scheduling conflicts (the final four of the Indonesian IBL was scheduled about the same time as this Asian Championship).

Indonesia co-hosted the 2023 FIBA Basketball World Cup along with Philippines and Japan although its national team did not finish at least among the top eight in the 2022 FIBA Asia Cup and failed to qualify.

== History ==
In the 1930s, even though it had not officially become an independent country, several cities in Indonesia already had local basketball clubs. After the proclamation of independence on 17 August 1945, basketball games began to be widely known in the cities that were involved in rivalries as Yogyakarta vs. Solo. The game of basketball was played for the first time at the national level in 1948 in Solo at the National Sports Week I (PON I). Although this organization does not yet have a national sports master, it can get a quite lively welcome, both in terms of viewers and from the participants themselves.

Three years after that, on 23 October 1951, the Indonesian Basketball Association was formed and named Persatuan Basketball Seluruh Indonesia. In 1955, due to the improvement of the name in accordance with Indonesian rules, the federation was renamed Persatuan Bola Basket Seluruh Indonesia (PERBASI). Perbasi was later accepted as a member of FIBA in 1953, and a year later, for the first time Indonesia sent a team to compete in the 1954 Asian Games in Manila.

== Kit ==
2015–2021: Hype Clothes

2021–2023: Nuraga

2023–2025: One Stop Apparel

2025–present: Mills

=== Sponsor ===
2016: Hi-Test

2021–2022: Sinar Mas Group

2022–present: Bank Mandiri

== Competitive record ==
=== Olympic Games ===
Olympic Games record
Year	Position	Pld	W	L
(Finland) 1952	Did not qualify			
(Australia) 1956	Did not qualify			
(Italy) 1960	Did not qualify			
(Japan) 1964	Did not qualify			
(Mexico) 1968	Did not qualify			
(Germany) 1972	Did not qualify			
(Canada) 1976	Did not qualify			
(Soviet Union) 1980	Did not qualify			
(United States) 1984	Did not qualify			
(South Korea) 1988	Did not qualify			
(Spain) 1992	Did not qualify			
(United States) 1996	Did not qualify			
(Australia) 2000	Did not qualify			
(Greece) 2004	Did not qualify			
(China) 2008	Did not qualify			
(United Kingdom) 2012	Did not qualify			
(Brazil) 2016	Did not qualify			
(Japan) 2020	Did not qualify			
(France) 2024	Did not qualify			
(United States) 2028	To be determined			
Total	TBD	0	0	0

=== FIBA Basketball World Cup ===
FIBA World Cup record
Year	Position	Pld	W	L
(Argentina) 1950	Did not qualify			
(Brazil) 1954	Did not qualify			
(Chile) 1959	Did not qualify			
(Brazil) 1963	Did not qualify			
(Uruguay) 1967	Did not qualify			
(Socialist Federal Republic of Yugoslavia) 1970	Did not qualify			
(Puerto Rico) 1974	Did not qualify			
(Philippines) 1978	Did not qualify			
(Colombia) 1982	Did not qualify			
(Spain) 1986	Did not qualify			
(Argentina) 1990	Did not qualify			
(Canada) 1994	Did not qualify			
(Greece) 1998	Did not qualify			
(United States) 2002	Did not qualify			
(Japan) 2006	Did not qualify			
(Turkey) 2010	Did not qualify			
(Spain) 2014	Did not qualify			
(China) 2019	Did not qualify			
(Philippines) (Japan) (Indonesia) 2023	Did not qualify despite being the host			
(Qatar) 2027	Did not qualify			
(France) 2031	To be determined			
Total	TBD	0	0	0

=== FIBA Asia Cup ===
FIBA Asia Cup record
Year	Position	Pld	W	L
(Philippines) 1960	6th place	6	1	5
(Taiwan) 1963	Did not enter			
(Malaysia) 1965	Did not enter			
(South Korea) 1967	4th place	9	5	4
(Thailand) 1969	Did not enter			
(Japan) 1971	Did not enter			
(Philippines) 1973	8th place	10	6	4
(Thailand) 1975	10th place	9	2	7
(Malaysia) 1977	13th place	9	1	8
(Japan) 1979	Did not enter			
(India) 1981	Did not enter			
(Hong Kong) 1983	12th place	6	1	5
(Malaysia) 1985	11th place	5	1	4
(Thailand) 1987	12th place	6	2	4
(China) 1989	14th place	6	1	5
(Japan) 1991	14th place	7	1	6
(Indonesia) 1993	12th place	6	2	4
(South Korea) 1995	18th place	6	1	5
(Saudi Arabia) 1997	12th place	7	2	5
(Japan) 1999	Did not enter			
(China) 2001	Did not qualify			
(China) 2003	Did not enter			
(Qatar) 2005	14th place	7	1	6
(Japan) 2007	12th place	7	2	5
(China) 2009	15th place	5	1	4
(China) 2011	13th place	5	2	3
(Philippines) 2013	Did not qualify			
(China) 2015	Did not qualify			
(Lebanon) 2017	Did not qualify			
(Indonesia) 2022	11th place	4	1	3
(Saudi Arabia) 2025	Did not qualify			
2029	To be determined			
Total	18/31	120	33	87

=== Asian Games ===
Asian Games record
Host/Year	Position	Pld	W	L
(Philippines) 1954	5th place	3	1	2
(Japan) 1958	9th place	3	3	3
(Indonesia) 1962	5th place	6	2	4
(Indonesia) 2018	8th place	6	1	5
(China) 2022	15th place	3	0	3
(Japan) 2026	12th place	3	0	3
Total	6/20	24	7	17

=== FIBA Asia Challenge ===
FIBA Asia Challenge record
Host/Year	Round	Position	Pld	W	L
(China) 2014	9th place	9th	4	0	4

=== SEABA Championship ===
SEABA Championship record
Host / Year	Position	Pld	W	L
(Malaysia) 1994	3rd place	–	–	–
(Indonesia) 1996	1st place	5	4	1
(Philippines) 1998	Did not participate			
(Philippines) 2001	4th place	4	1	3
(Malaysia) 2003	Did not participate			
(Malaysia) 2005	2nd place	4	3	1
(Thailand) 2007	2nd place	4	3	1
(Indonesia) 2009	2nd place	4	2	2
(Indonesia) 2011	2nd place	4	2	2
(Indonesia) 2013	4th place	3	1	2
(Singapore) 2015	4th place	5	2	3
(Philippines) 2017	2nd place	6	5	1
Total	10/12	39	23	16

=== SEABA Cup ===
SEABA Cup record
Host / Year	Position	Pld	W	L
(Thailand) 2012	2nd place	4	2	2
(Indonesia) 2014	2nd place	2	1	1
(Thailand) 2016	5th place	4	0	4
Total	3/3	10	3	7

=== Islamic Solidarity Games ===
Islamic Solidarity Games record
Host / Year	Position	Pld	W	L
(Saudi Arabia) 2005	Did not participate			
(Indonesia) 2013	3rd place	4	2	2
Total	1/2	4	2	2

=== SEA Games ===
SEA Games record
Host / Year	Position	Pld	W	L
(Malaysia) 1977	5th place	–	–	–
(Indonesia) 1979	unknown	–	–	–
(Philippines) 1981	Did not participate			
(Singapore) 1983	5th place	5	1	4
(Thailand) 1985	unknown	–	–	–
(Indonesia) 1987	4th place	–	–	–
(Malaysia) 1989	5th place	4	0	4
(Philippines) 1991	5th place	4	0	4
(Singapore) 1993	3rd place	–	–	–
(Thailand) 1995	4th place	7	4	3
(Indonesia) 1997	4th place	4	–	–
(Brunei) 1999	3rd place	–	–	–
(Malaysia) 2001	2nd place	5	4	1
(Vietnam) 2003	5th place	5	1	4
(Philippines) 2005	Not held			
(Thailand) 2007	2nd place	4	3	1
(Laos) 2009	Not held			
(Indonesia) 2011	3rd place	5	4	1
(Myanmar) 2013	5th place	6	2	4
(Singapore) 2015	2nd place	5	3	2
(Malaysia) 2017	2nd place	6	5	1
(Philippines) 2019	4th place	5	2	3
(Vietnam) 2021	1st place	6	6	0
(Cambodia) 2023	4th place	5	3	2
(Thailand) 2025	3rd place	5	3	2
Total	22/23	81	41	40

== Coaching staff ==
Position	Name
Team Manager	(Indonesia) Rivaldo Tandra
Head Coach	(United States) David Singleton
Associate Head Coach	(Indonesia) Johannis Winar
Assistant Coaches	(Indonesia) Andri Malay
Assistant Coaches	(Indonesia) Ismael Tan
Skill & Development Coach	(United States) Tyler Arturo Farias
Skill & Development Assistant Coaches	(Indonesia) Amin Prihantono
Skill & Development Assistant Coaches	(Indonesia) Rusta Wijaya
Strength & Conditioning Coach	(Indonesia) Gavy Malhotra
Strength & Conditioning Assistant Coaches	(Indonesia) Fathan Kautsar
Physioterapist	(Indonesia) Iqbal Ramadhan
Video Coordinator	(Indonesia) Danny Kusuma

== Current roster ==
The following is the roster for the 2026 Asian Games tournament.

Indonesia men's national basketball team - 2026 Asian Games roster
Players
Coaches

Pos.	No.	Name	Age – Date of birth	Height	Club	Ctr.
C	1	Derrick Michael Xzavierro	23 – 1 April 2003	2.08 m (6 ft 10 in)	Saga Ballooners	(Japan)
G	4	Abraham Damar Grahita	30 – 8 October 1995	1.80 m (5 ft 11 in)	Satria Muda	(Indonesia)
F	6	Ali Bagir	26 – 4 July 2000	1.95 m (6 ft 5 in)	Free agent
G	7	Andakara Prastawa	34 – 16 August 1992	1.73 m (5 ft 8 in)	Pelita Jaya	(Indonesia)
G	8	Yudha Saputera (C)	27 – 21 November 1998	1.73 m (5 ft 8 in)	Satria Muda	(Indonesia)
C	15	Vincent Rivaldi Kosasih	30 – 17 June 1996	2.03 m (6 ft 8 in)	Pelita Jaya	(Indonesia)
G	21	Hendrick Xavi Yonga	24 – 7 August 2002	1.85 m (6 ft 1 in)	Pelita Jaya	(Indonesia)
C	25	Lester Prosper	37 – 21 September 1988	2.09 m (6 ft 10 in)	Dewa United	(Indonesia)
F	29	Dame Diagne	21 – 29 July 2005	1.98 m (6 ft 6 in)	Satria Muda	(Indonesia)
F	34	Pandu Wiguna	30 – 6 October 1995	1.94 m (6 ft 4 in)	Dewa United	(Indonesia)
F	77	Fhirdan Guntara	28 – 2 September 1998	1.84 m (6 ft 0 in)	Bogor Hornbills	(Indonesia)
G	88	Anthony Beane	32 – 6 May 1994	1.88 m (6 ft 2 in)	Pelita Jaya	(Indonesia)

Head coach

- (United States) David Singleton

Assistant coach(es)

- (Indonesia) Andri Malay
- (Indonesia) Ismael

Legend

- (C) Team captain
- Club - describes last
  club before the tournament
- Age - describes age
  on 10 September 2026

== Past rosters ==
=== 2019 Southeast Asian Games ===
Indonesia national basketball team roster
Players
Coaches

Pos.	No.	Name	Age – Date of birth	Height	Club
G/F	0	Juan Laurent	24 – 15 July 1995	1.94 m (6 ft 4 in)	Satria Muda Pertamina Jakarta	(Indonesia)
PG	2	Hardianus Lakudu	27 – 7 March 1992	1.78 m (5 ft 10 in)	Satria Muda Pertamina Jakarta	(Indonesia)
SF	3	Kaleb Ramot Gemilang	28 – 31 May 1991	1.83 m (6 ft 0 in)	Stapac Jakarta	(Indonesia)
G	4	Abraham Damar Grahita	24 – 8 October 1995	1.78 m (5 ft 10 in)	Stapac Jakarta	(Indonesia)
PG	7	Andakara Prastawa	27 – 16 August 1992	1.78 m (5 ft 10 in)	Pelita Jaya Basketball Club	(Indonesia)
F	8	Laurentius Steven Oei	25 – 1 September 1994	1.94 m (6 ft 4 in)	Satria Muda Pertamina Jakarta	(Indonesia)
F	10	Kevin Yonas Sitorus	25 – 17 July 1994	1.98 m (6 ft 6 in)	Satria Muda Pertamina Jakarta	(Indonesia)
G	12	Reggie William Mononimbar	24 – 29 May 1995	1.85 m (6 ft 1 in)	Pelita Jaya Basketball Club	(Indonesia)
G	17	Mei Joni	30 – 17 May 1989	1.88 m (6 ft 2 in)	Stapac Jakarta	(Indonesia)
G	23	Avan Seputra	25 – 18 May 1994	1.90 m (6 ft 3 in)	Satria Muda Pertamina Jakarta	(Indonesia)
F	31	Muhammad Hardian Wicaksono	26 – 31 August 1993	1.90 m (6 ft 3 in)	Pacific Caesar Surabaya	(Indonesia)
C	33	Vincent Rivaldi Kosasih	23 – 17 June 1996	2.03 m (6 ft 8 in)	Stapac Jakarta	(Indonesia)

Head coach

- (Serbia) Rajko Toroman

Assistant coach(es)

- (Indonesia) Johannis Winar
- (Indonesia) Wahyu Widayat Jati

Legend

- (C) Team captain
- Club – describes last
  club before the tournament
- Age – describes age

=== 2021 Southeast Asian Games ===
Indonesia national basketball team roster
Players
Coaches

Pos.	No.	Name	Age – Date of birth	Height	Club	Ctr.
PG	7	Andakara Prastawa Dhyaksa	29 – August 16, 1992	1.72 m (5 ft 8 in)	Pelita Jaya Bakrie Jakarta	(Indonesia)
PG	2	Hardianus Lakudu	30 – March 3, 1992	1.76 m (5 ft 9 in)	Satria Muda Pertamina Jakarta	(Indonesia)
PG	11	Yudha Saputera	23 – November 21, 1998	1.68 m (5 ft 6 in)	Prawira Bandung	(Indonesia)
SG	4	Abraham Damar Grahita	26 – October 8, 1995	1.80 m (5 ft 11 in)	Prawira Bandung	(Indonesia)
SG	24	Agassi Goantara	22 – October 17, 1999	1.87 m (6 ft 2 in)	CB Alhama Baloncesto	(Spain)
SF	33	Arki Dikania Wisnu	34 – March 15, 1988	1.87 m (6 ft 2 in)	Satria Muda Pertamina Jakarta	(Indonesia)
SF	3	Brandon Jawato	28 – June 3, 1993	1.93 m (6 ft 4 in)	SeaHorses Mikawa	(Japan)
PF	0	Juan Laurent	26 – July 15, 1995	1.93 m (6 ft 4 in)	Satria Muda Pertamina Jakarta	(Indonesia)
PF	29	Dame Diagne	16 – July 29, 2005	1.96 m (6 ft 5 in)	Indonesia Patriots	(Indonesia)
PF	1	Derrick Michael Xzavierro	19 – April 1, 2003	2.06 m (6 ft 9 in)	Grand Canyon Antelopes	(United States)
C	15	Vincent Rivaldi Kosasih	25 – June 17, 1996	2.03 m (6 ft 8 in)	Pelita Jaya Bakrie Jakarta	(Indonesia)
C	22	Marques Bolden	24 – April 17, 1998	2.08 m (6 ft 10 in)	Salt Lake City Stars	(United States)

Head coach

- (Serbia) Miloš Pejić

Assistant coach(es)

- (Indonesia) Johannis Winar
- (Indonesia) Wahyu Widayat Jati

Legend

- Club – describes last
  club before the tournament
- Age – describes age

=== 2022 FIBA Asia Cup ===
Indonesia national basketball team roster
Players
Coaches

Pos.	No.	Name	Age – Date of birth	Height	Club	Ctr.
PG	7	Andakara Prastawa Dhyaksa	29 – August 16, 1992	1.73 m (5 ft 8 in)	Pelita Jaya Bakrie Jakarta	(Indonesia)
PG	71	Widyanta Putra Teja	25 – April 13, 1997	1.80 m (5 ft 11 in)	West Bandits Solo	(Indonesia)
PG	11	Yudha Saputera	23 – November 21, 1998	1.76 m (5 ft 9 in)	Prawira Bandung	(Indonesia)
SG	4	Abraham Damar Grahita	26 – October 8, 1995	1.80 m (5 ft 11 in)	Prawira Bandung	(Indonesia)
SG	24	Agassi Goantara	22 – October 17, 1999	1.87 m (6 ft 2 in)	CB Alhama Baloncesto	(Spain)
SF	33	Arki Dikania Wisnu	34 – March 15, 1988	1.87 m (6 ft 2 in)	Satria Muda Pertamina Jakarta	(Indonesia)
SF	3	Brandon Jawato	28 – June 3, 1993	1.93 m (6 ft 4 in)	SeaHorses Mikawa	(Japan)
PF	0	Juan Laurent	26 – July 15, 1995	1.93 m (6 ft 4 in)	Satria Muda Pertamina Jakarta	(Indonesia)
SG	12	Muhamad Arighi	23 – February 12, 1999	1.82 m (6 ft 0 in)	Pelita Jaya Bakrie Jakarta	(Indonesia)
PF	1	Derrick Michael Xzavierro	19 – April 1, 2003	2.08 m (6 ft 10 in)	Grand Canyon Antelopes	(United States)
C	15	Vincent Rivaldi Kosasih	25 – June 17, 1996	2.03 m (6 ft 8 in)	Pelita Jaya Bakrie Jakarta	(Indonesia)
C	22	Marques Bolden	24 – April 17, 1998	2.08 m (6 ft 10 in)	Milwaukee Bucks	(United States)

Head coach

- (Serbia) Miloš Pejić

Assistant coach(es)

- (Indonesia) Johannis Winar
- (Indonesia) Wahyu Widayat Jati

Legend

- Club – describes last
  club before the tournament
- Age – describes age
  on May 12, 2022

=== 2023 Southeast Asian Games ===
Indonesia national basketball team roster
Players
Coaches

Pos.	No.	Name	Age – Date of birth	Height	Club	Ctr.
PG	7	Andakara Prastawa	29 – August 16, 1992	1.72 m (5 ft 8 in)	Pelita Jaya Bakrie Jakarta	(Indonesia)
PG	2	Anthony Beane	28 – May 6, 1994	1.88 m (6 ft 2 in)	Indonesia Patriots	(Indonesia)
PG	11	Yudha Saputera	23 – November 21, 1998	1.76 m (5 ft 9 in)	Prawira Bandung	(Indonesia)
SG	4	Muhamad Arighi	23 – February 12, 1999	1.82 m (6 ft 0 in)	Pelita Jaya Bakrie Jakarta	(Indonesia)
F	14	Julian Chalias	19 – August 10, 2002	1.97 m (6 ft 6 in)	Indonesia Patriots	(Indonesia)
SF	13	Kaleb Gemilang	30 – May 30, 1991	1.83 m (6 ft 0 in)	Dewa United Banten	(Indonesia)
SF	3	Brandon Jawato	28 – June 3, 1993	1.93 m (6 ft 4 in)	SeaHorses Mikawa	(Japan)
PF	0	Juan Laurent	26 – July 15, 1995	1.93 m (6 ft 4 in)	Satria Muda Pertamina Jakarta	(Indonesia)
PF	29	Dame Diagne	16 – July 29, 2005	1.96 m (6 ft 5 in)	Indonesia Patriots	(Indonesia)
C	25	Lester Prosper	33 – September 21, 1988	2.09 m (6 ft 10 in)	Suwon KT Sonicboom	(South Korea)
C	15	Vincent Rivaldi Kosasih	25 – June 17, 1996	2.03 m (6 ft 8 in)	Pelita Jaya Bakrie Jakarta	(Indonesia)
PG	71	Widyanta Putra Teja	25 – April 13, 1997	1.80 m (5 ft 11 in)	Satria Muda Pertamina Jakarta	(Indonesia)

Head coach

- (Serbia) Miloš Pejić

Assistant coach(es)

- (Indonesia) Johannis Winar
- (Indonesia) Wahyu Widayat Jati

Legend

- Club – describes last
  club before the tournament
- Age – describes age

=== 2025 FIBA Asia Cup qualification ===
Indonesia national basketball team roster
Players
Coaches

Pos.	No.	Name	Age – Date of birth	Height	Club	Ctr.
SG	23	Avan Seputra	30 – May 18, 1994	1.94 m (6 ft 4 in)	Satria Muda Pertamina	(Indonesia)
SF	3	Brandon Jawato	31 – June 3, 1993	1.94 m (6 ft 4 in)	Pelita Jaya Bakrie	(Indonesia)
SG	4	Abraham Damar Grahita	26 – October 8, 1998	1.80 m (5 ft 11 in)	Satria Muda Pertamina	(Indonesia)
PG	8	Yudha Saputera	26 – October 21, 1998	1.75 m (5 ft 9 in)	Prawira Bandung	(Indonesia)
SG	9	Rio Disi	31 – December 4, 1992	1.85 m (6 ft 1 in)	Dewa United Banten	(Indonesia)
PF	4	Julian Chalias	21 – August 12, 2002	2.00 m (6 ft 7 in)	Satria Muda Pertamina	(Indonesia)
SG	13	Kaleb Gemilang	30 – May 30, 1991	1.83 m (6 ft 0 in)	Dewa United Banten	(Indonesia)
SF	19	Muhammad Reza Guntara	31 – January 24, 1993	1.95 m (6 ft 5 in)	Pelita Jaya Bakrie	(Indonesia)
PG	60	Abraham Wenas	28 – June 5, 1996	1.75 m (5 ft 9 in)	Kesatria Bengawan Solo	(Indonesia)
G	88	Anthony Beane	30 – May 6, 1994	1.88 m (6 ft 2 in)	Pelita Jaya Bakrie	(Indonesia)
C	34	Pandu Wiguna	29 – October 6, 1995	1.94 m (6 ft 4 in)	Prawira Bandung	(Indonesia)
C	15	Vincent Rivaldi Kosasih	27 – June 17, 1996	2.03 m (6 ft 8 in)	Pelita Jaya Bakrie	(Indonesia)
PF		Ali Bagir	24 – July 4, 2000	1.94 m (6 ft 4 in)	Satria Muda Pertamina	(Indonesia)
G		Muhamad Arighi	25 – February 12, 1999	1.83 m (6 ft 0 in)	Pelita Jaya Bakrie	(Indonesia)

Head coach

- (Indonesia) Johannis Winar

Assistant coach(es)

- (Indonesia) Youbel Sondakh
- (Indonesia) Ismael Tan

Legend

- Club – describes last
  club before the tournament
- Age – describes age

== Naturalized players ==
Name	Club	Pos	Country of Birth	Years in National Team
Ebrahim Enguio Lopez	Free Agent	SG	Philippines	2015–2018
Jamarr Johnson	(Indonesia) Pacific Caesar	SF	USA	2017–2019
Anthony Ray Hargrove Jr	Free Agent	PF	USA	2016–2017
Anthony Wayne Carter Jr	Free Agent	PG	USA	2016
Brandon Jawato	(Indonesia) Pelita Jaya Bakrie	PG/SF	USA	2019–
Lester Prosper	(Indonesia) Dewa United Banten	C	DMA	2019–
Marques Bolden	(Japan) Levanga Hokkaido	C	USA	2021–
Dame Diagne	(Indonesia) Satria Muda Bandung	SF	SEN	2021–
Serigne Modou Kane	(Indonesia) Satria Muda Bandung	SF	SEN	2021–
Anthony Beane	(Indonesia) Pelita Jaya Bakrie	PG	USA	2023–

== Coaching history ==
Name	Years	Competition	Position
(China) Ho	1993		
(South Korea) Kim Dong-won	1995		
(Philippines) Bong Ramos	1996		
(Russia) Arcivoc	1997		
(Indonesia) Tjetjep Firmansyah	1999–2001		
(Philippines) Bong Ramos	2003		
(Indonesia) Fictor Gideon Roring	2005–2007		
(Indonesia) Rastafari Horongbala	2009–2011	2009 SEABA Championship	(silver) Silver Medal
(Indonesia) Rastafari Horongbala	2009–2011	2009 FIBA Asia Championship	15th place
(Indonesia) Rastafari Horongbala	2009–2011	2011 SEABA Championship	(silver) Silver Medal
(Indonesia) Rastafari Horongbala	2009–2011	2011 Southeast Asian Games	(bronze) Bronze Medal
(Indonesia) Rastafari Horongbala	2009–2011	2011 FIBA Asia Championship	13th place
(Indonesia) Tjetjep Firmansyah	2013	2013 SEABA Championship	4th place
(Indonesia) Tjetjep Firmansyah	2013	2013 Islamic Solidarity Games	(bronze) Bronze Medal
(Indonesia) Tjetjep Firmansyah	2013	2013 Southeast Asian Games	5th place
(Indonesia) Rastafari Horongbala	2014	2014 SEABA Cup	(silver) Silver Medal
(Indonesia) Rastafari Horongbala	2014	2014 FIBA Asia Cup	9th place
(Indonesia) Fictor Gideon Roring	2014–2015	2015 Southeast Asian Games	(silver) Silver Medal
(Indonesia) Antonius Ferry Rinaldo	2015–2016	2015 SEABA Championship	4th place
(Indonesia) Antonius Ferry Rinaldo	2015–2016	2016 SEABA Cup	5th place
(Indonesia) Wahyu Widayat Jati	2016–2017	2017 Southeast Asian Games	(silver) Silver Medal
(Indonesia) Wahyu Widayat Jati	2016–2017	2017 SEABA Championship	(silver) Silver Medal
(Indonesia) Fictor Gideon Roring	2017–2019	2018 Asian Games	8th place
(Indonesia) Fictor Gideon Roring	2017–2019	2018 William Jones Cup	9th place
(Indonesia) Wahyu Widayat Jati	2019	2019 William Jones Cup	8th place
(Serbia) Rajko Toroman	2019–2022	2019 Southeast Asian Games	4th place
(Serbia) Miloš Pejić	2022–2024	2021 Southeast Asian Games	(gold) Gold Medal
(Serbia) Miloš Pejić	2022–2024	2022 FIBA Asia Cup	11th place
(Serbia) Miloš Pejić	2022–2024	2022 Asian Games	15th place
(Serbia) Miloš Pejić	2022–2024	2023 Southeast Asian Games	4th place
(Indonesia) Johannis Winar	2024–2025		
(United States) David Singleton	2025–2026	2025 SEA Games	(bronze) Bronze Medal
(Indonesia) Koko Heru Nugroho	2026–present		

== Gallery ==
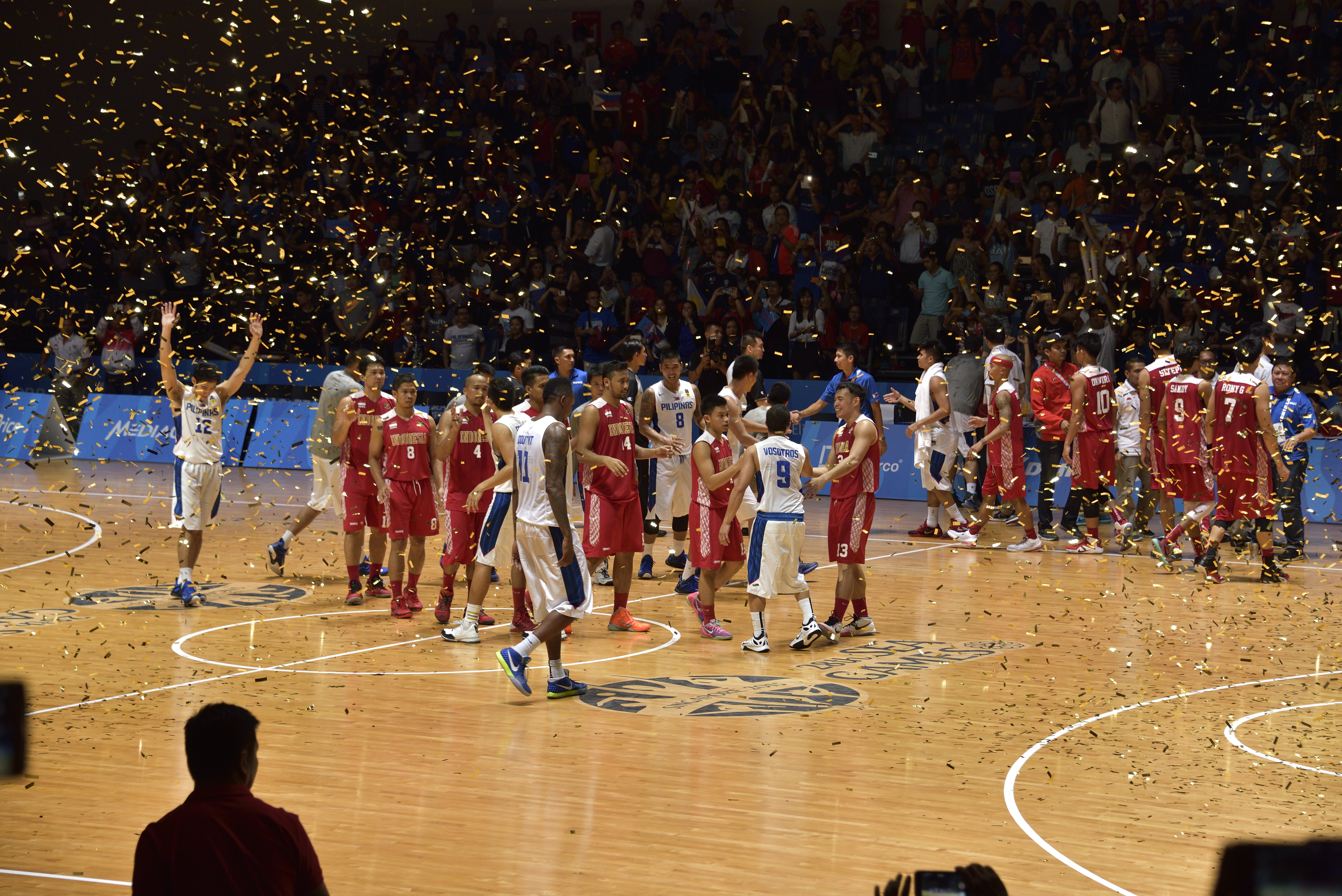
The Indonesian and Philippine men's national basketball team just after the finals of the men's basketball tournament of the 2015 Southeast Asian Games.

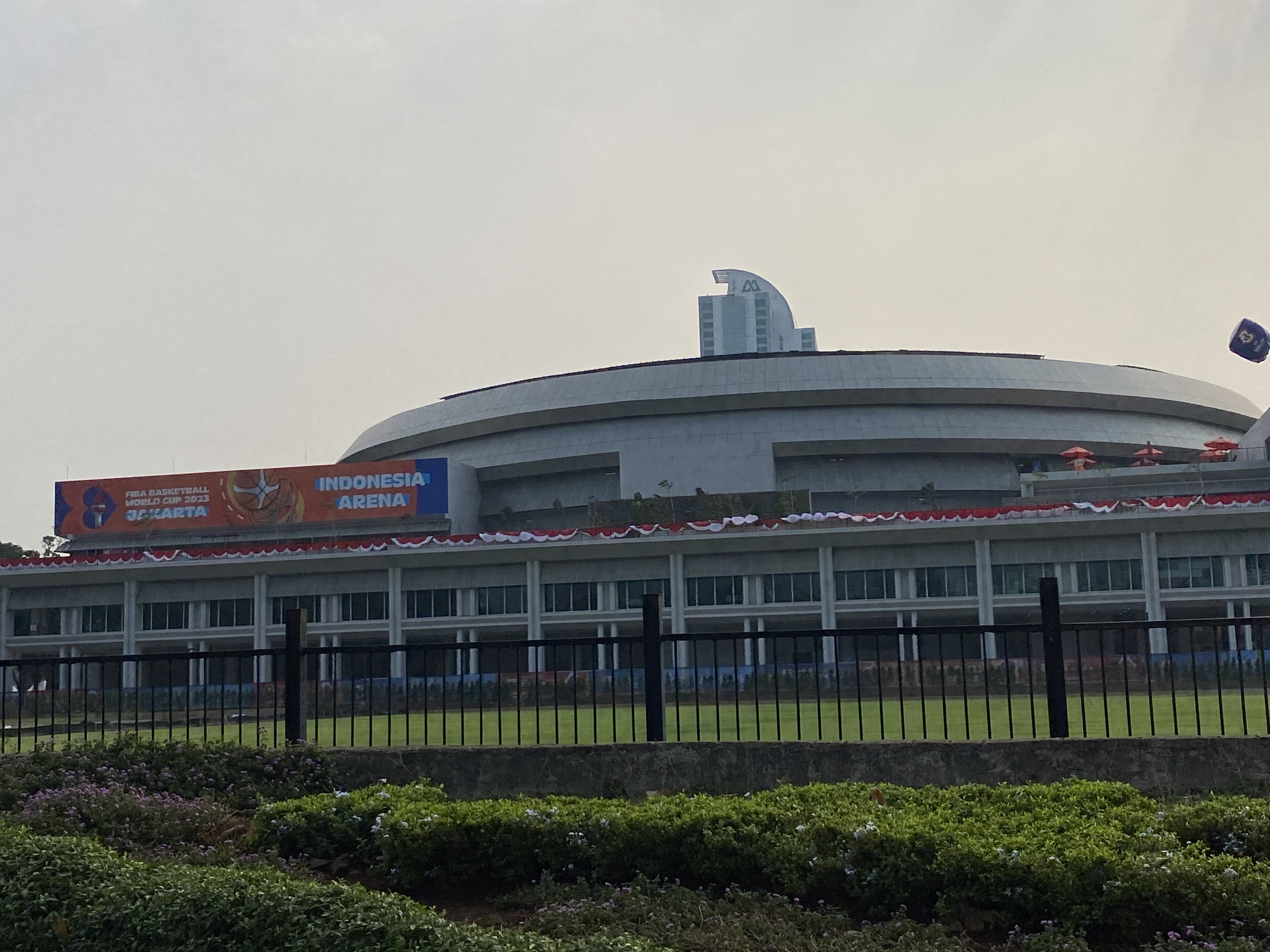
Indonesia Arena, the new venue of Indonesia men's national basketball team

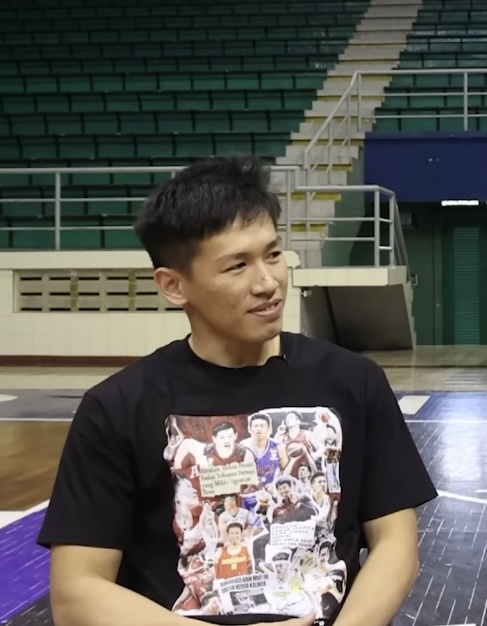
Abraham Damar Grahita

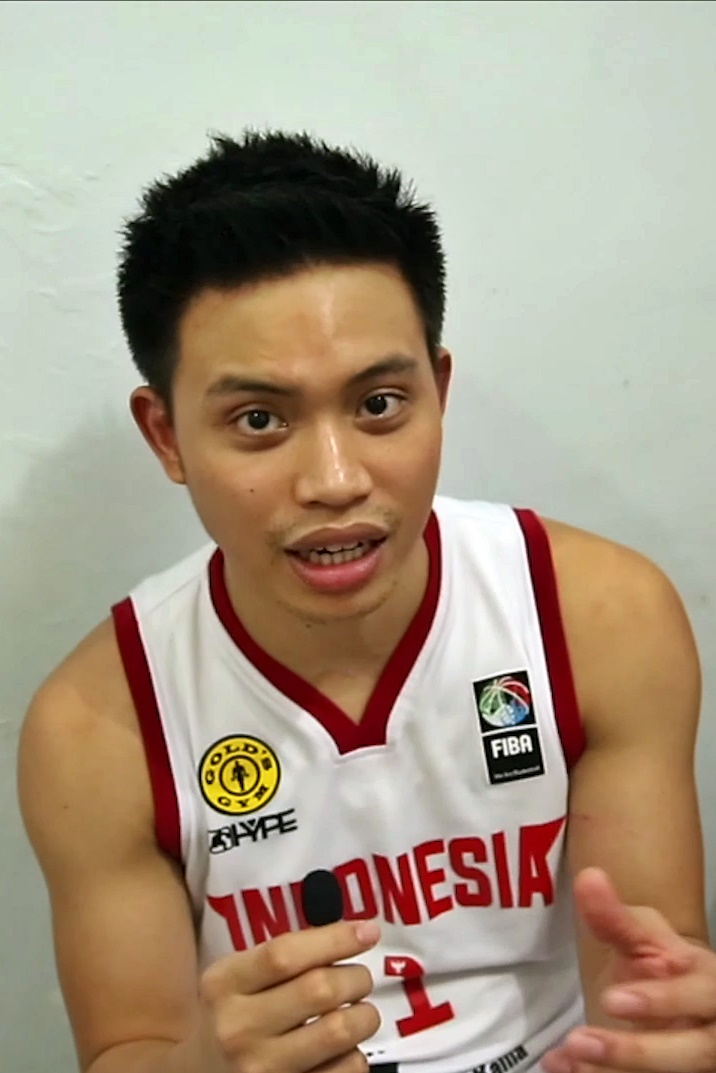
Andakara Prastawa

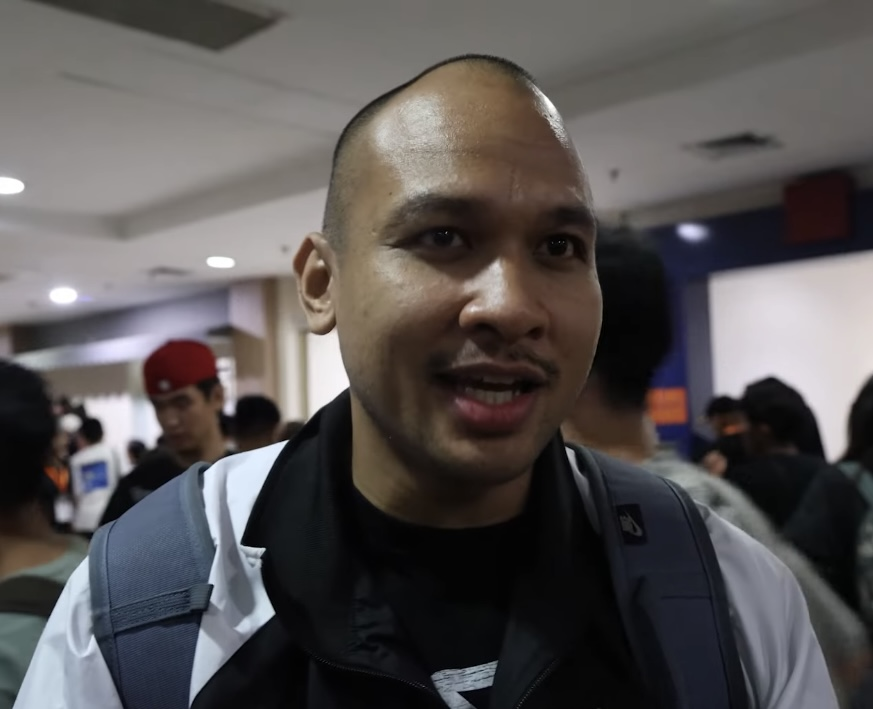
Kaleb Gemilang

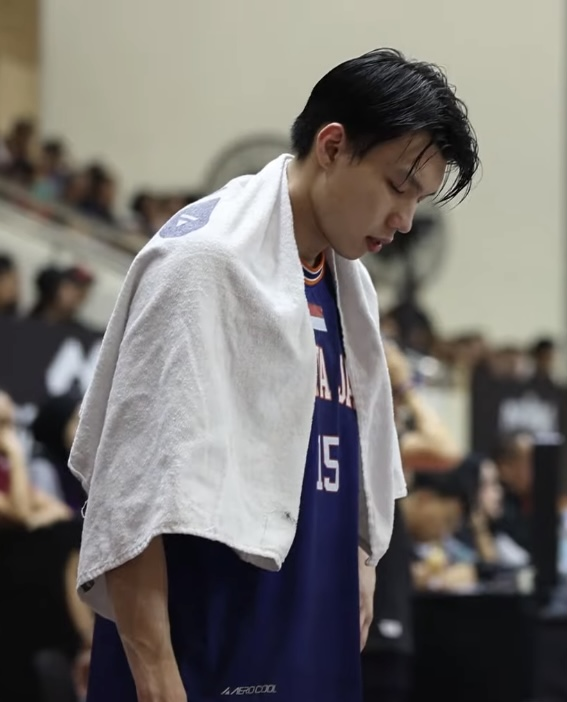
Vincent Kosasih

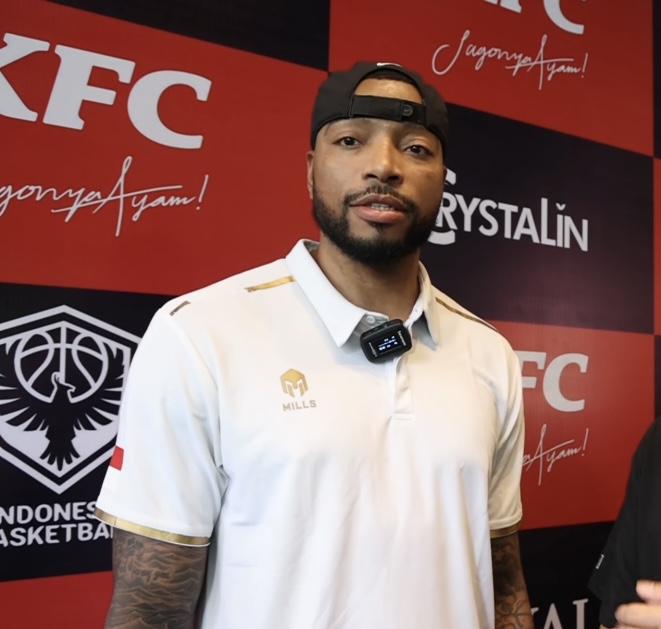
Jamarr Johnson

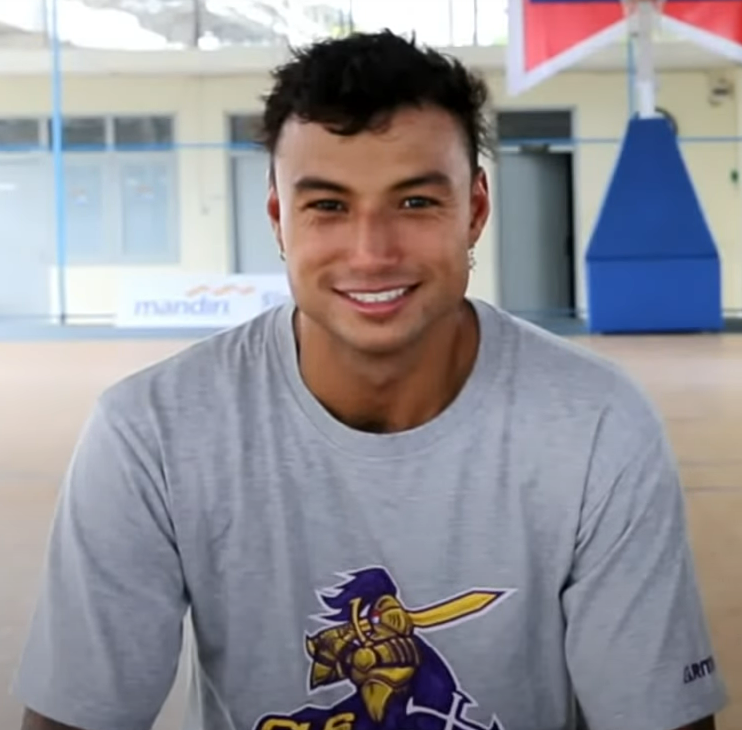
Brandon Jawato

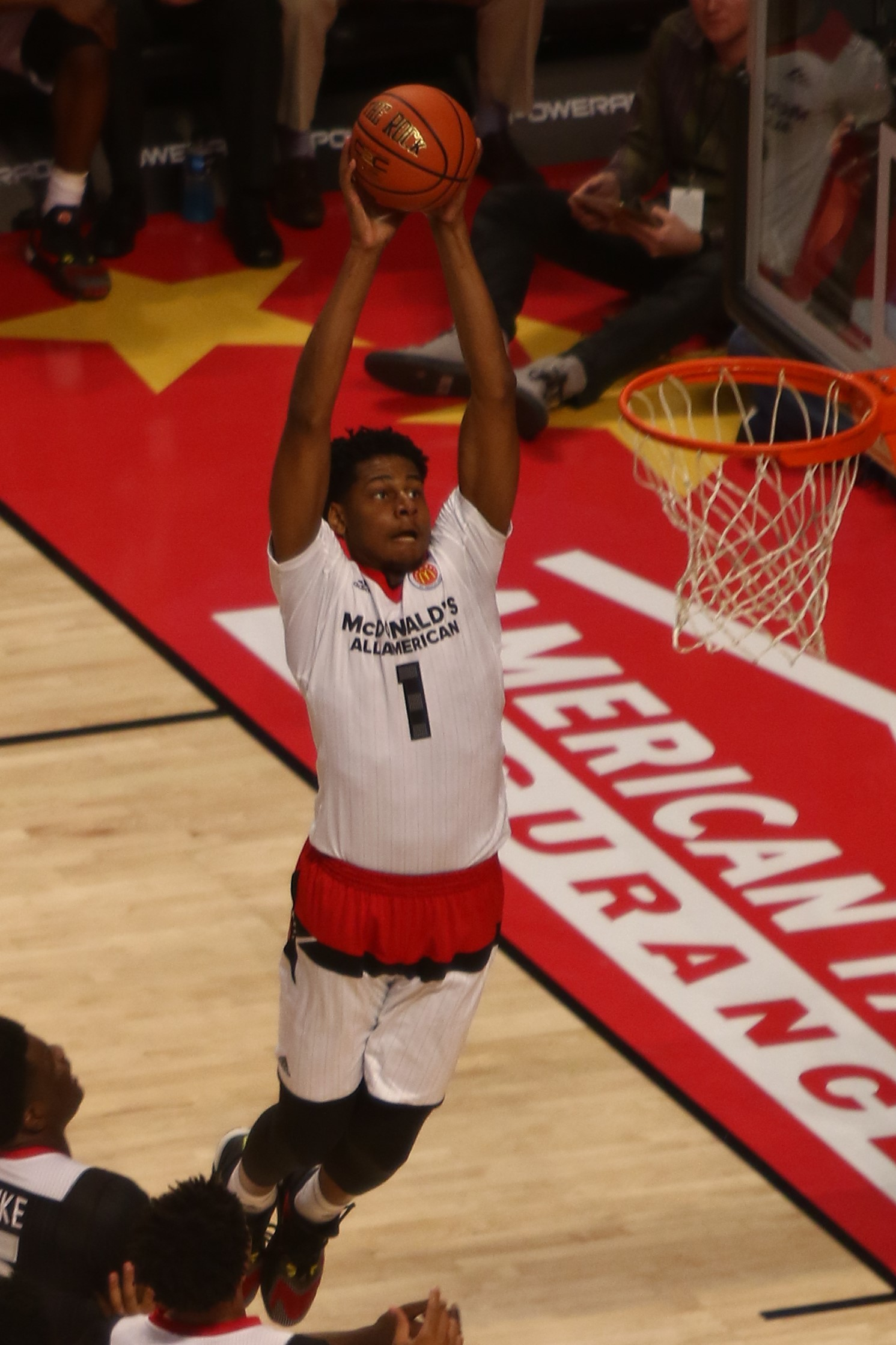
Marques Bolden

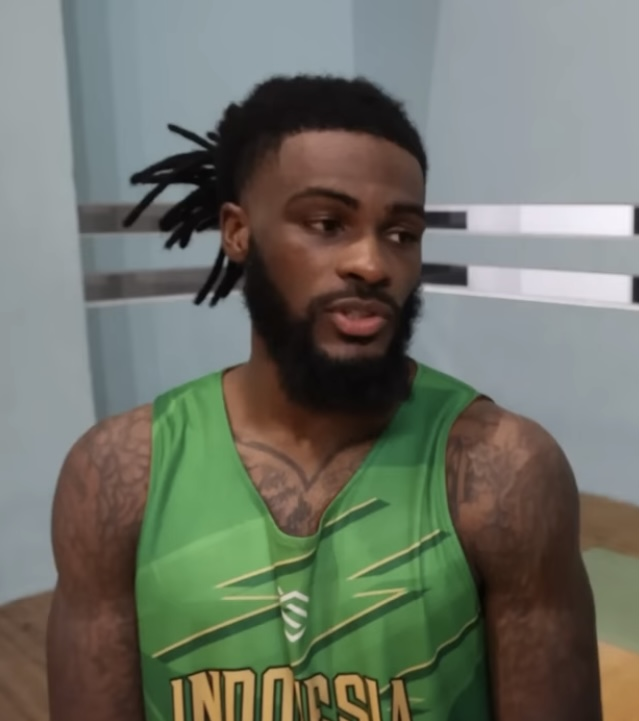
Anthony Beane

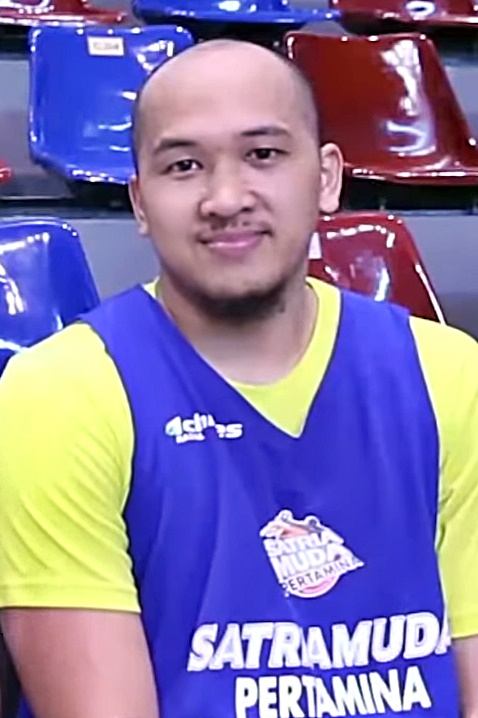
Arki Wisnu

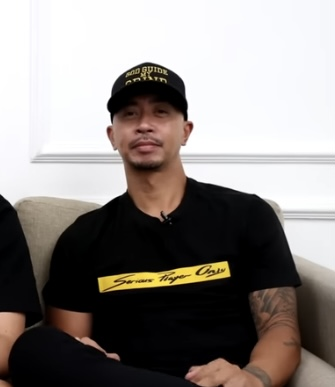
Mario Wuysang

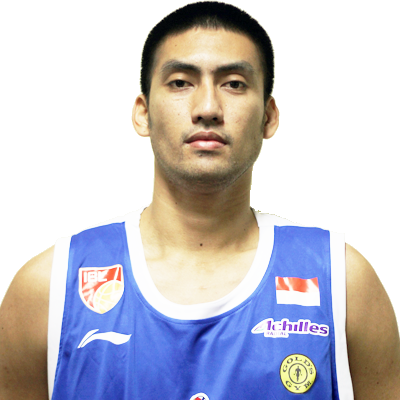
Christian Ronaldo Sitepu

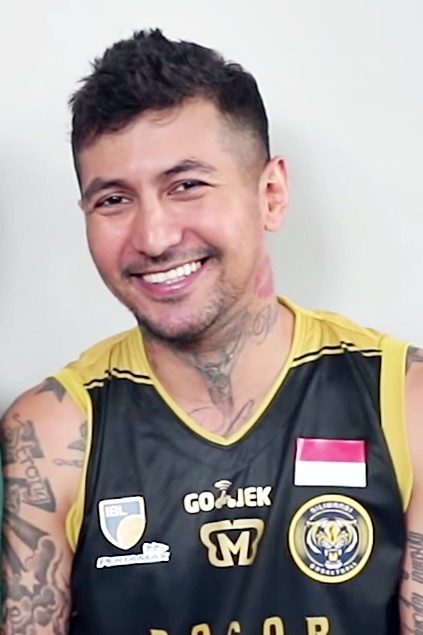
Kelly Purwanto

== See also ==
- Indonesian Basketball Association
- Indonesia women's national basketball team
- Indonesia men's national 3x3 team
- Indonesia men's national under-18 basketball team
- Indonesia men's national under-16 basketball team
