= SEABA Cup =

International basketball tournament

- Most recent season or competition: 2016 SEABA Cup
- Founded: 2012
- Country: SEABA member nations
- Continent: FIBA Asia (Asia)
- Most recent champion: Philippines (2nd title)
- Most titles: Philippines (2 titles)

The SEABA Cup is an international basketball tournament in the International Basketball Federation's Southeast Asia Basketball Association, one of FIBA Asia's subzone. The tournament, which is being held every two years, is the qualifying event for the previously known as FIBA Asia Cup that is now the FIBA Asia Challenge.

== Summary ==
Year	Host	Champion	Second Place	Third Place	Fourth Place
2012; Details	(Thailand); Chiang Mai	Philippines	Indonesia	Thailand	Singapore
2014; Details	(Indonesia); Batam	Singapore	Indonesia	Malaysia	—N/a
2016; Details	(Thailand); Bangkok	Philippines	Thailand	Singapore	Malaysia
