= SEABA Championship =

Basketball tournament

- Founded: 1994
- Folded: 2017
- Country: SEABA member nations
- Continent: FIBA Asia (Asia)
- Last champion: Philippines (8th title)
- Most titles: Philippines (8 titles)

The SEABA Championship was a basketball tournament for national teams organized by the Southeast Asia Basketball Association, a sub-zone of FIBA Asia. It previously served as a qualifier for the FIBA Asia Cup.

== Summary ==
Year	Hosts	Final			Third Place Game		
Year	Hosts	Champions	Score	Runners-up	Third Place	Score	Fourth Place
1994; Details	(Malaysia); Segamat	Malaysia	N/A	Thailand	Indonesia	N/A	Philippines U19
1996; Details	(Indonesia); Surabaya	Indonesia	88–81	Philippines	Malaysia and Thailand (a third place game took place but the result is unknown)		
1998; Details	(Philippines); Manila	Philippines	90–69	Thailand	Malaysia	N/A	Singapore
2001; Details	(Philippines); Manila	Philippines	90–73	Thailand	Singapore	81–78; OT	Indonesia
2003; Details	(Malaysia); Kuala Lumpur	Philippines	No playoffs	Malaysia	Thailand	No playoffs	Vietnam
2005; Details	(Malaysia); Kuala Lumpur	Malaysia	No playoffs	Indonesia	Thailand	No playoffs	Singapore
2007; Details	(Thailand); Ratchaburi	Philippines	No playoffs	Indonesia	Malaysia	No playoffs	Thailand
2009; Details	(Indonesia); Medan	Philippines	98–68	Indonesia	Malaysia	No playoffs	Singapore
2011; Details	(Indonesia); Jakarta	Philippines	89–50	Indonesia	Malaysia	No playoffs	Singapore
2013; Details	(Indonesia); Medan	Thailand	73–63	Malaysia	Singapore	No playoffs	Indonesia
2015; Details	Singapore	Philippines	No playoffs	Malaysia	Singapore	No playoffs	Indonesia
2017; Details	(Philippines); Quezon City	Philippines	No playoffs	Indonesia	Thailand	No playoffs	Malaysia

== Medal table ==
Rank	Nation	Gold	Silver	Bronze	Total
1	Philippines	8	1	0	9
2	Malaysia	2	3	4	9
3	Indonesia	1	5	1	7
4	Thailand	1	3	3	7
5	Singapore	0	0	3	3
Totals (5 entries)		12	12	11	35

== Performance by teams ==
- Teams that qualified to the FIBA Asia Championship are in **boldface**.

Team	(Malaysia) 1994	(Indonesia) 1996	(Philippines) 1998	(Philippines) 2001	(Malaysia) 2003	(Malaysia) 2005	(Thailand) 2007	(Indonesia) 2009	(Indonesia) 2011	(Indonesia) 2013	(Singapore) 2015	(Philippines) 2017	Years
Brunei	7th	DNP	5th/6th	7th	–	–	–	–	–	–	6th	–	4
Cambodia	8th	5th	7th	–	–	–	–	–	–	–	–	–	3
Indonesia	**3rd**	**1st**	–	4th	–	**2nd**	**2nd**	**2nd**	**2nd**	4th	4th	2nd	10
Laos	–	–	8th	–	–	–	–	–	–	–	5th	–	2
Malaysia	**1st**	3rd/4th	**3rd**^{[A]}	5th	**2nd**	**1st**	3rd	3rd	**3rd**	**2nd**	**2nd**	4th	12
Myanmar	6th	–	–	–	–	–	–	–	–	–	–	7th	2
Philippines	**4th**	**2nd**	**1st**	**1st**^{[B]}	**1st**	–^{[D]}	**1st**	**1st**	**1st**	–^{[E]}	**1st**	**1st**	10
Singapore	5th	–	4th	**3rd**^{[C]}	–	4th	5th	4th	4th	3rd	**3rd**	5th	10
Thailand	**2nd**	3rd/4th	**2nd**	**2nd**	3rd	3rd	4th	–	–	**1st**	–	3rd	9
Vietnam	–	–	5th/6th	6th	4th	5th	–	–	–	–	–	6th	5
Participating teams	8	5	8	7	4	5	5	4	4	4	6	7	

^{A} National basketball federation was awarded a wildcard following the pullout of North Korea and Kazakhstan.
^{B} National basketball federation qualified, but later was suspended.
^{C} National basketball federation took over the spot for the Philippines.
^{D} National basketball federation was suspended.
^{E} National basketball federation was host of the FIBA Asia Championship.
