= Thein Han (basketball) =

Burmese basketball player

Personal information
- Born: March 20, 1998 (age 28)
- Listed height: 6 ft 2 in (1.88 m)
- Position: Center

Thein Han (born 20 March 1998) is a basketball player from Myanmar. He represented Myanmar's national basketball team at the 2017 SEABA Championship in Quezon City, Philippines.

There, at only 19 years of age, he was the tournament's dominant stealer as he averaged 3.0 steals per game, far ahead of the second placed Jio Jalalon of the Philippines who recorded 2.0 per game. Further, Han Thein was the tournament's top shot blocker as he averaged 2.3 per game.

At the game against Vietnam, he came close to reaching a quadruple-double, an extremely rare achievement for a single player in a basketball game.
