= 2011 SEABA Championship =

9th Southeast Asian Basketball Championship

Tournament details
- Host country: Indonesia
- Dates: June 23–26
- Teams: 4
- Venue(s): 1 (in 1 host city)

Final positions
- Champions: Philippines (6th title)

The 9th Southeast Asia Basketball Association Championship was the qualifying tournament for the 2011 FIBA Asia Championship; it also served as a regional championship involving Southeast Asian basketball teams. It was held on June 23 to June 26, 2011, at Jakarta, Indonesia. The top three finishers qualified to the 2011 FIBA Asia Championship.

== Preliminary round ==
Team	Pld	W	L	PF	PA	PD	Pts
Philippines	3	3	0	297	176	+121	6
Indonesia	3	2	1	202	201	+1	5
Malaysia	3	1	2	190	238	−48	4
Singapore	3	0	3	175	249	−74	3

June 23
16:00

Malaysia	71–97	Philippines
Scoring by quarter: 20–20, 21–16, 16–27, 14–34

The BritAma Arena, Jakarta

June 23
19:00

Indonesia	71–60	Singapore
Scoring by quarter: 16–14, 15–20, 17–20, 23–6

The BritAma Arena, Jakarta

June 24
16:00

Singapore	64–72	Malaysia
Scoring by quarter: 17–21, 13–23, 7–16, 27–12

The BritAma Arena, Jakarta

June 24
18:00

Philippines	94–54	Indonesia
Scoring by quarter: 20–9, 29–13, 22–16, 23–16

The BritAma Arena, Jakarta

June 25
16:00

Singapore	51–106	Philippines
Scoring by quarter: 9–30, 14–30, 20–17, 8–29

The BritAma Arena, Jakarta

June 25
18:00

Indonesia	77–47	Malaysia
Scoring by quarter: 10–4, 23–23, 20–16, 24–4

The BritAma Arena, Jakarta

== Final ==
June 26
18:00

Philippines	89–50	Indonesia
Scoring by quarter: 31–10, 15–17, 21–8, 22–15

The BritAma Arena, Jakarta

== Final standings ==
	Qualified for the 2011 FIBA Asia Championship
Rank	Team
Gold medal	Philippines
Silver medal	Indonesia
Bronze medal	Malaysia
4th	Singapore

== Awards ==
2011 Southeast Asian champions

Philippines
Sixth title
