= 2005 FIBA Asia Championship qualification =

The 2005 FIBA Asia Championship qualification was held in late 2004 and early 2005 with the Gulf region, West Asia, Southeast Asia, East Asia and Middle Asia (Central Asia and South Asia) each conducting tournaments.

== Qualification format ==
The following are eligible to participate:

- The organizing country.
- The champion team from the previous FIBA Asia Stanković Cup.
- The four best-placed teams from the previous FIBA Asia Stanković Cup will qualify the same number of teams from their respective sub-zones.
- The two best teams from the sub-zones.

== FIBA Asia Stanković Cup ==
Rank	Team	Note
1st place, gold medalist(s)	Qatar	Hosts
2nd place, silver medalist(s)	South Korea	Direct Qualifier
3rd place, bronze medalist(s)	Chinese Taipei	East Asia (+1)
4	Syria	West Asia (+1)
5	Japan	East Asia (+2)
6	India	Middle Asia (+1)
7	Kuwait	
8	Philippines	

== Qualified teams ==
East Asia (1+2+2)	Gulf (1+2)	Middle Asia (2+1)	Southeast Asia (2)	West Asia (2+1)
South Korea	Qatar	Kazakhstan	Malaysia	Iran
China	Saudi Arabia	India	Indonesia	Lebanon
Chinese Taipei	Kuwait	Uzbekistan		Jordan
Japan				
Hong Kong				

== East Asia ==
The 2005 East Asia Basketball Championship is the qualifying tournament for the 2005 FIBA Asia Championship. the four best teams excluding Korea qualifies for 2005 FIBA Asia Championship. The tournament was held at Yangjiang, China.

Team	Pld	W	L	PF	PA	PD	Pts	Tiebreaker
South Korea	5	5	0	406	346	+60	10	
China	5	3	2	373	327	+46	8	1–1 / 1.015
Chinese Taipei	5	3	2	406	364	+42	8	1–1 / 1.014
Japan	5	3	2	312	302	+10	8	1–1 / 0.968
Hong Kong	5	1	4	303	396	−93	6	
Mongolia	5	0	5	325	390	−65	5	

May 26

South Korea	93–69	Hong Kong

Yangjiang Gymnasium, Yangjiang

May 26

China	94–70	Mongolia

Yangjiang Gymnasium, Yangjiang

May 26

Japan	61–73	Chinese Taipei

Yangjiang Gymnasium, Yangjiang

May 27

Hong Kong	56–77	China

Yangjiang Gymnasium, Yangjiang

May 27

Mongolia	73–88	Chinese Taipei

Yangjiang Gymnasium, Yangjiang

May 27

South Korea	73–64	Japan

Yangjiang Gymnasium, Yangjiang

May 28

South Korea	82–65	Mongolia

Yangjiang Gymnasium, Yangjiang

May 28

China	83–73	Chinese Taipei

Yangjiang Gymnasium, Yangjiang

May 28

Hong Kong	50–72	Japan

Yangjiang Gymnasium, Yangjiang

May 29

Mongolia	62–70	Hong Kong

Yangjiang Gymnasium, Yangjiang

May 29

Japan	59–51	China

Yangjiang Gymnasium, Yangjiang

May 29

Chinese Taipei	80–89	South Korea

Yangjiang Gymnasium, Yangjiang

May 30

Japan	56–55	Mongolia

Yangjiang Gymnasium, Yangjiang

May 30

Hong Kong	58–92	Chinese Taipei

Yangjiang Gymnasium, Yangjiang

May 30

China	68–69	South Korea

Yangjiang Gymnasium, Yangjiang

== Gulf ==
The 2004 Gulf Basketball Association Championship is the qualifying tournament for the 2005 FIBA Asia Championship. the two best teams excluding Qatar qualifies for 2005 FIBA Asia Championship. The tournament was held at Dammam, Saudi Arabia.

Team	Pld	W	L	PF	PA	PD	Pts
Saudi Arabia	5	5	0	445	348	+97	10
Qatar	5	4	1	375	275	+100	9
Kuwait	5	3	2	358	368	−10	8
Bahrain	5	2	3	387	362	+25	7
United Arab Emirates	5	1	4	347	353	−6	6
Oman	5	0	5	249	455	−206	5

September 14

Kuwait	77–71	United Arab Emirates

Hall of Youth Care, Dammam

September 14

Oman	57–113	Saudi Arabia

Hall of Youth Care, Dammam

September 14

Qatar	65–51	Bahrain

Hall of Youth Care, Dammam

September 15

Oman	38–93	Qatar

Hall of Youth Care, Dammam

September 15

Saudi Arabia	84–74	United Arab Emirates

Hall of Youth Care, Dammam

September 15

Kuwait	79–76	Bahrain

Hall of Youth Care, Dammam

September 16

Bahrain	109–52	Oman

Hall of Youth Care, Dammam

September 16

Saudi Arabia	85–75	Kuwait

Hall of Youth Care, Dammam

September 16

Qatar	67–56	United Arab Emirates

Hall of Youth Care, Dammam

September 18

Kuwait	73–59	Oman

Hall of Youth Care, Dammam

September 18

Saudi Arabia	76–73	Qatar

Hall of Youth Care, Dammam

September 18

Bahrain	82–79	United Arab Emirates

Hall of Youth Care, Dammam

September 19

Oman	43–67	United Arab Emirates

Hall of Youth Care, Dammam

September 19

Kuwait	54–77	Qatar

Hall of Youth Care, Dammam

September 19

Bahrain	69–87	Saudi Arabia

Hall of Youth Care, Dammam

== Middle Asia ==
The 2005 Middle Asia Basketball Championship is the qualifying tournament for the 2005 FIBA Asia Championship. the three best teams qualifies for 2005 FIBA Asia Championship. The tournament was held at New Delhi, India.

Team	Pld	W	L	PF	PA	PD	Pts
Kazakhstan	4	4	0	466	203	+263	8
India	4	3	1	403	245	+158	7
Uzbekistan	4	2	2	397	255	+142	6
Bangladesh	4	1	3	218	472	−254	5
Nepal	4	0	4	201	510	−309	4

July 6

Nepal	50–131	India

Talkatora Stadium, New Delhi

July 6

Bangladesh	33–149	Kazakhstan

Talkatora Stadium, New Delhi

July 7

Kazakhstan	95–58	Uzbekistan

Talkatora Stadium, New Delhi

July 7

India	131–52	Bangladesh

Talkatora Stadium, New Delhi

July 8

Uzbekistan	67–68	India

Talkatora Stadium, New Delhi

July 8

Nepal	62–91	Bangladesh

Talkatora Stadium, New Delhi

July 9

Kazakhstan	146–39	Nepal

Talkatora Stadium, New Delhi

July 9

Bangladesh	42–130	Uzbekistan

Talkatora Stadium, New Delhi

July 10

Uzbekistan	142–50	Nepal

Talkatora Stadium, New Delhi

July 10

India	73–76	Kazakhstan

Talkatora Stadium, New Delhi

== Southeast Asia ==
2005 SEABA Championship
6th Southeast Asian Basketball Championship

Tournament details
- Host country: Malaysia
- Dates: 5–9 July
- Teams: 5 (from 10 federations)
- Venue: 1 (in 1 host city)

Final positions
- Champions: Malaysia (2nd title)

The 6th Southeast Asia Basketball Association Championship is the qualifying tournament for the 2005 FIBA Asia Championship. the two best teams qualifies for 2005 FIBA Asia Championship. The tournament was held at Kuala Lumpur, Malaysia.

Team	Pld	W	L	PF	PA	PD	Pts
Malaysia	4	4	0	344	231	+113	8
Indonesia	4	3	1	366	258	+108	7
Thailand	4	2	2	304	299	+5	6
Singapore	4	1	3	297	340	−43	5
Vietnam	4	0	4	238	421	−183	4

July 5

Vietnam	47–98	Malaysia

MABA Stadium, Kuala Lumpur

July 5

Singapore	77–102	Indonesia

MABA Stadium, Kuala Lumpur

July 6

Malaysia	98–55	Singapore

MABA Stadium, Kuala Lumpur

July 6

Thailand	116–74	Vietnam

MABA Stadium, Kuala Lumpur

July 7

Vietnam	67–97	Singapore

MABA Stadium, Kuala Lumpur

July 7

Indonesia	83–57	Thailand

MABA Stadium, Kuala Lumpur

July 8

Malaysia	74–71	Indonesia

MABA Stadium, Kuala Lumpur

July 8

Singapore	68–73	Thailand

MABA Stadium, Kuala Lumpur

July 9

Thailand	58–74	Malaysia

MABA Stadium, Kuala Lumpur

July 9

Indonesia	110–50	Vietnam

MABA Stadium, Kuala Lumpur

== West Asia ==
The 2005 West Asia Basketball Association Championship is the qualifying tournament for the 2005 FIBA Asia Championship. the three best teams qualifies for 2005 FIBA Asia Championship. The tournament was held at Beirut, Lebanon.

Team	Pld	W	L	PF	PA	PD	Pts
Iran	4	4	0	331	254	+77	8
Lebanon	4	3	1	387	236	+151	7
Jordan	4	2	2	336	299	+37	6
Yemen	4	1	3	211	357	−146	5
Iraq	4	0	4	231	350	−119	4

June 29

Lebanon	113–55	Iraq

Sports City Stadium, Beirut

June 29

Iran	87–76	Jordan

Sports City Stadium, Beirut

June 30

Yemen	40–118	Lebanon

Sports City Stadium, Beirut

June 30

Iraq	63–96	Iran

Sports City Stadium, Beirut

July 1

Iran	67–66	Lebanon

Sports City Stadium, Beirut

July 1

Jordan	104–63	Yemen

Sports City Stadium, Beirut

July 2

Yemen	49–81	Iran

Sports City Stadium, Beirut

July 2

Iraq	59–82	Jordan

Sports City Stadium, Beirut

July 3

Iraq	54–59	Yemen

Sports City Stadium, Beirut

July 3

Jordan	74–90	Lebanon

Sports City Stadium, Beirut
