= 2007 FIBA Asia Championship qualification =

The 2007 FIBA Asia Championship qualification was held in early 2007 with the Gulf region, West Asia, Southeast Asia, East Asia and Middle Asia (Central Asia and South Asia) each conducting tournaments.

== Qualification format ==
The following are eligible to participate:

- The organizing country.
- The champion team from the previous FIBA Asia Stanković Cup.
- The four best-placed teams from the previous FIBA Asia Stanković Cup will qualify the same number of teams from their respective sub-zones.
- The two best teams from the sub-zones.

== FIBA Asia Stanković Cup ==
After the cancellation of 2006 FIBA Asia Stanković Cup which was supposed to be held in Damascus, Syria between 20th to 29th of July, The final ranking of the 2005 FIBA Asia Championship was counted instead.

| Rank | Team | Note |
|---|---|---|
| 1st place, gold medalist(s) | China | Direct Qualifier |
| 2nd place, silver medalist(s) | Lebanon | West Asia (+1) |
| 3rd place, bronze medalist(s) | Qatar | Gulf (+1) |
| 4 | South Korea | East Asia (+1) |
| 5 | Japan | Hosts |
| 6 | Iran | West Asia (+2) |
| 7 | Jordan | |
| 8 | Saudi Arabia | |
| 9 | Chinese Taipei | |
| 10 | Kazakhstan | |
| 11 | Uzbekistan | |
| 12 | India | |
| 13 | Kuwait | |
| 14 | Indonesia | |
| 15 | Hong Kong | |
| 16 | Malaysia | |

== Qualified teams ==
| East Asia (2+2+1) | Gulf (2+1) | Middle Asia (2) | Southeast Asia (2) | West Asia (2+2) |
|---|---|---|---|---|
| Japan | Qatar | Kazakhstan | Philippines | Iran |
| China | ~~Saudi Arabia~~ * | India | Indonesia | Jordan |
| Chinese Taipei | United Arab Emirates | | | Lebanon |
| Hong Kong | | | | Syria |
| South Korea | | | | |

* With Saudi Arabia's withdrawal, Kuwait qualified in their place.

== East Asia ==
All the others withdrew, so Chinese Taipei, Hong Kong and South Korea qualified automatically.

== Gulf ==
The 2006 Gulf Basketball Association Championship is the qualifying tournament for the 2007 FIBA Asia Championship.

| Team | Pld | W | L | PF | PA | PD | Pts |
|---|---|---|---|---|---|---|---|
| Qatar | 5 | 5 | 0 | 386 | 264 | +122 | 10 |
| Saudi Arabia | 5 | 4 | 1 | 345 | 289 | +56 | 9 |
| United Arab Emirates | 5 | 3 | 2 | 351 | 298 | +53 | 8 |
| Bahrain | 5 | 2 | 3 | 323 | 348 | −25 | 7 |
| Kuwait | 5 | 1 | 4 | 325 | 355 | −30 | 6 |
| Oman | 5 | 0 | 5 | 194 | 370 | −176 | 5 |

September 15

| Saudi Arabia | 68–52 | Bahrain |

Al-Gharafa Indoor Hall, Doha

September 15

| United Arab Emirates | 64–24 | Oman |

Al-Gharafa Indoor Hall, Doha

September 15

| Kuwait | 53–87 | Qatar |

Al-Gharafa Indoor Hall, Doha

September 16

| Bahrain | 68–40 | Oman |

Al-Gharafa Indoor Hall, Doha

September 16

| Saudi Arabia | 68–61 | Kuwait |

Al-Gharafa Indoor Hall, Doha

September 16

| United Arab Emirates | 53–73 | Qatar |

Al-Gharafa Indoor Hall, Doha

September 17

| Oman | 32–74 | Saudi Arabia |

Al-Gharafa Indoor Hall, Doha

September 17

| Kuwait | 53–70 | United Arab Emirates |

Al-Gharafa Indoor Hall, Doha

September 17

| Qatar | 78–59 | Bahrain |

Al-Gharafa Indoor Hall, Doha

September 19

| Saudi Arabia | 77–71 | United Arab Emirates |

Al-Gharafa Indoor Hall, Doha

September 19

| Kuwait | 69–73 | Bahrain |

Al-Gharafa Indoor Hall, Doha

September 19

| Oman | 41–75 | Qatar |

Al-Gharafa Indoor Hall, Doha

September 20

| Kuwait | 89–57 | Oman |

Al-Gharafa Indoor Hall, Doha

September 20

| United Arab Emirates | 93–71 | Bahrain |

Al-Gharafa Indoor Hall, Doha

September 20

| Saudi Arabia | 58–73 | Qatar |

Al-Gharafa Indoor Hall, Doha

== Middle Asia ==
The Middle Asia Championship is the qualifying tournament for the 2007 FIBA Asia Championship; it also serves as a regional championship involving Central Asian and South Asian nations basketball teams. The teams in the final advance to the FIBA Asia Championship.

The tournament was held at Colombo, Sri Lanka.

=== Preliminary round ===
| Team | Pld | W | L | PF | PA | PD | Pts |
|---|---|---|---|---|---|---|---|
| Kazakhstan | 2 | 2 | 0 | 203 | 94 | +109 | 4 |
| India | 2 | 1 | 1 | 157 | 154 | +3 | 3 |
| Sri Lanka | 2 | 0 | 2 | 120 | 232 | −112 | 2 |

May 28

| Sri Lanka | 54–115 | Kazakhstan |

Sugathadasa Indoor Stadium, Colombo

May 29

| Kazakhstan | 88–40 | India |

Sugathadasa Indoor Stadium, Colombo

May 30

| India | 117–66 | Sri Lanka |

Sugathadasa Indoor Stadium, Colombo

=== Final ===
May 31

| Kazakhstan | 74–63 | India |

Sugathadasa Indoor Stadium, Colombo

=== Final standing ===
| Rank | Team |
|---|---|
| 1st place, gold medalist(s) | Kazakhstan |
| 2nd place, silver medalist(s) | India |
| 3rd place, bronze medalist(s) | Sri Lanka |

== Southeast Asia ==
2007 SEABA Championship
7th Southeast Asian Basketball Championship

Tournament details
- Host country: Thailand
- Dates: 24–28 May
- Teams: 5 (from 10 federations)
- Venue: 1 (in 1 host city)

Final positions
- Champions: Philippines (4th title)

The 7th Southeast Asia Basketball Association Championship was the qualifying tournament for the 2007 FIBA Asia Championship; it also served as a regional championship involving Southeast Asian basketball teams. The two teams with the best records advances to the FIBA Asia Championship.

The local name of the tournament held in Ratchaburi, Thailand was 11th Crown Prince Cup International Invitational Basketball Tournament.

| Team | Pld | W | L | PF | PA | PD | Pts |
|---|---|---|---|---|---|---|---|
| Philippines | 4 | 4 | 0 | 405 | 251 | +154 | 8 |
| Indonesia | 4 | 3 | 1 | 256 | 267 | −11 | 7 |
| Malaysia | 4 | 2 | 2 | 297 | 300 | −3 | 6 |
| Thailand | 4 | 1 | 3 | 273 | 283 | −10 | 5 |
| Singapore | 4 | 0 | 4 | 225 | 355 | −130 | 4 |

May 24

| Malaysia | 66–72 | Indonesia |

Provincial Gymnasium, Ratchaburi

May 24

| Thailand | 75–50 | Singapore |

Provincial Gymnasium, Ratchaburi

May 25

| Singapore | 55–122 | Philippines |

Provincial Gymnasium, Ratchaburi

May 25

| Thailand | 67–72 | Malaysia |

Provincial Gymnasium, Ratchaburi

May 26

| Malaysia | 87–59 | Singapore |

Provincial Gymnasium, Ratchaburi

May 26

| Indonesia | 48–85 | Philippines |

Provincial Gymnasium, Ratchaburi

May 27

| Philippines | 102–72 | Malaysia |

Provincial Gymnasium, Ratchaburi

May 27

| Indonesia | 65–55 | Thailand |

Provincial Gymnasium, Ratchaburi

May 28

| Singapore | 61–71 | Indonesia |

Provincial Gymnasium, Ratchaburi

May 28

| Thailand | 76–96 | Philippines |

Provincial Gymnasium, Ratchaburi

== West Asia ==
All the others withdrew, so Iran, Jordan, Lebanon and Syria qualified automatically.
