= 2009 SEABA Championship =

8th Southeast Asian Basketball Championship

Tournament details
- Host country: Indonesia
- Dates: July 6–9
- Teams: 4
- Venue(s): 1 (in 1 host city)

Final positions
- Champions: Philippines (5th title)

The 8th Southeast Asia Basketball Association Championship was held in Medan, Indonesia from 6–9 July 2009. It was to determine the two representatives of SEABA in the 2009 FIBA Asia Championship. The Philippines won the championship. Laos and Thailand was supposed to participate but withdrew.

== Preliminary round ==
Team	Pld	W	L	PF	PA	PD	Pts
Philippines	3	3	0	320	206	+114	6
Indonesia	3	2	1	217	235	−18	5
Malaysia	3	1	2	222	244	−22	4
Singapore	3	0	3	204	278	−74	3

June 6
19:00

Malaysia	73–100	Philippines

Angkasapura Lanud Hall, Medan

June 6
21:00

Singapore	65–79	Indonesia

Angkasapura Lanud Hall, Medan

June 7
19:00

Singapore	70–82	Malaysia

Angkasapura Lanud Hall, Medan

June 7
21:00

Philippines	103–64	Indonesia

Angkasapura Lanud Hall, Medan

June 8
19:00

Singapore	69–117	Philippines

Angkasapura Lanud Hall, Medan

June 8
21:00

Malaysia	67–74	Indonesia

Angkasapura Lanud Hall, Medan

== Final ==
June 9
19:00

Philippines	98–68	Indonesia

Angkasapura Lanud Hall, Medan

== Awards ==
2009 Southeast Asian champions

Philippines
Fifth title

== Final standings ==
Rank	Team	Qualification
Gold medal	Philippines	2009 FIBA Asia Championship
Silver medal	Indonesia	2009 FIBA Asia Championship
Bronze medal	Malaysia	
4th	Singapore	
