= 1996 SEABA Championship =

International basketball tournament

2nd Southeast Asian Basketball Championship

Tournament details
- Host country: Indonesia
- Dates: 24 November – 1 December
- Teams: 5
- Venue(s): 1 (in 1 host city)

Final positions
- Champions: Indonesia (1st title)

The 2nd Southeast Asia Basketball Association Championship was held from 24 November to 1 December in Surabaya, Indonesia. Matches were held at the Kertajaya Stadium which has a 5,000 seating capacity. Cambodia participated for the first time at the tournament.

== Round robin ==
Qualified for the final and 1997 ABC Championship
Qualified for third place match

Team	Pld	W	L	PF	PA	PD	Pts
Philippines	4	4	0	415	297	+118	8
Indonesia	4	3	1	340	264	+76	7
Malaysia	4	2	2	329	278	+51	6
Thailand	4	2	2	345	295	+50	6
Cambodia	4	0	4	205	500	−295	4

Known matches

24 November
19:45

Match Results 1, 2

Malaysia	81–95	Philippines
Scoring by half: 49–41, 32–54

Kertajaya Stadium, Surabaya
Attendance: 2,000

24 November

Match Results

Indonesia	122–49	Cambodia

Kertajaya Stadium, Surabaya

25 November
17:00

Match Results

Malaysia	55–65	Indonesia
Scoring by half: 34–31, 21–34

Kertajaya Stadium, Surabaya

25 November

Match Results

Thailand	129–56	Cambodia

Kertajaya Stadium, Surabaya

26 November
17:00

Match Results

Malaysia	118–45	Cambodia

Kertajaya Stadium, Surabaya

26 November
19:00

Match Results

Philippines	95–77	Thailand

Kertajaya Stadium, Surabaya

27 November

Match Results

Philippines	131–55	Cambodia
Scoring by half: 65–30, 66–25

Kertajaya Stadium, Surabaya

27 November

Match Results

Indonesia	69–66	Thailand

Kertajaya Stadium, Surabaya
Attendance: 2,000

28 November

Match Results

Philippines	94–84	Indonesia

Kertajaya Stadium, Surabaya

28 November
19:00

Match Results

Malaysia	75–73	Thailand

Kertajaya Stadium, Surabaya

== Final round ==
=== Third place game ===
30 November

Thailand	?–?	Malaysia

Kertajaya Stadium, Surabaya

=== Final ===
1 December

Match Results 1, 2

Philippines	81–88	Indonesia

Kertajaya Stadium, Surabaya

== Awards ==
1996 Southeast Asian champions

Indonesia
First title
