= Christian Ronaldo Sitepu =

Indonesian basketball player

Christian Sitepu
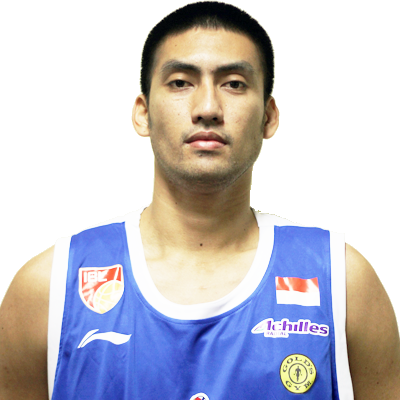
- Sitepu in 2015

Satria Muda Bandung
- Title: Club Director
- League: IBL

Personal information
- Born: October 27, 1986 (age 40) Bogor, West Java, Indonesia
- Listed height: 6 ft 7 in (2.01 m)
- Listed weight: 211.6 lb (96 kg)

Career information
- High school: SMAN 3 (Bogor, West Java)
- College: Perbanas Institute (2005-2011); Trisakti (2012-2014)
- NBA draft: 2008: undrafted
- Playing career: 2006–2018
- Position: Center / power forward
- Number: 15

Career history
- 2006–2018: Satria Muda Pertamina
- 2013: Indonesia Warriors

Career highlights
- 2× IBL All-Star (2017, 2018); All-NBL Indonesia First Team (2012); 5× IBL champion (2006–2009, 2018); 3× NBL Indonesia champion (2011, 2012, 2015); NBA Indonesia Development Camp MVP (2011)
Medals
Men's basketball
Representing Indonesia
Southeast Asian Games
Silver medal – second place	2017 Kuala Lumpur	Team
Silver medal – second place	2015 Singapore	Team
Bronze medal – third place	2011 Jakarta	Team
Islamic Solidarity Games
Bronze medal – third place	2013 Palembang	Team
SEABA Championship
Silver medal – second place	2011 Jakarta	Team
Silver medal – second place	2017 Manila	Team
SEABA Cup
Silver medal – second place	2012 Chiang Mai	Team

Christian Ronaldo Sitepu (born October 27, 1986) nicknamed Dodo, is a former Indonesian professional basketball player, he'is currently the club director for Satria Muda Bandung of the Indonesian Basketball League (IBL). He was the main center of the Indonesia national team between the 2000s and 2010s.

== Career statistics ==
=== Regular season ===
Year	Team	League	GP	MPG	FG%	3P%	FT%	RPG	APG	SPG	BPG	PPG
2016	Satria Muda	IBL	21	20.84	47%	50%	67%	4.24	1.81	0.90	0.67	8.00
2017	Satria Muda	IBL	14	18.73	42%	44%	78%	5.14	1.36	1.43	1.21	6.57

=== Playoffs ===
Year	Team	League	GP	MPG	FG%	3P%	FT%	RPG	APG	SPG	BPG	PPG
2016	Satria Muda	IBL	4	12.68	37%	0.00%	33%	3.50	0.25	0.75	0.50	4.25
2017	Satria Muda	IBL	5	21.61	29%	0.00%	67%	3.00	1.20	1.00	1.20	5.60

=== International ===
Year	Competition	GP	MPG	FG%	3P%	FT%	RPG	APG	SPG	BPG	PPG
2017	Southeast Asia Basketball Association Championship	6	25.3	44.2%	27.3%	55.6%	4.3	0.8	1.0	1.5	7.7
