= IBL Most Valuable Player Sony Hendrawan Award =

The Sony Hendrawan Indonesian Basketball League (IBL) Local Most Valuable Player award is given to the most outstanding local player on a team's roster. The award was renamed, after Sony Hendrawan, the only Indonesian that is inducted in the FIBA Hall of Fame.

Only one Naturalized player has won the award so far, with Jamarr Johnson being the last winner in 2021.

== All-time award winners ==
^	Denotes player who is still active in the Indonesian Basketball League
†	Denotes player whose team won championship that year
Player (X)	Denotes the number of times the player had been named MVP at that time
Team (X)	Denotes the number of times a player from this team had won at that time

Season	Player	Position	Nationality	Team	Ref.
2003	Denny Sumargo	G	Indonesia	Aspac Jakarta	
2004	I Made Sudiadnyana	F	Indonesia	Bhinneka Solo	
2005	Rony Gunawan	C	Indonesia	CLS Knights	
2006	Kelly Purwanto	G	Indonesia	Pelita Jaya	
2007	I Made Sudiadnyana	F	Indonesia	Bhinneka Solo (2)	
2008	Youbel Sondakh	F	Indonesia	Satria Muda	
2009	Youbel Sondakh (2)	F	Indonesia	Satria Muda	
2010	I Made Sudiadnyana	F	Indonesia	Garuda Bandung	
2011	I Made Sudiadnyana (5)	F	Indonesia	Garuda Bandung	
2012	Yanuar Dwi Priasmoro	G	Indonesia	Bima Sakti	
2013	Pringgo Regowo^	F	Indonesia	Dell Aspac	
2014	Ponsianus Nyoman Indrawan^	C	Indonesia	Pelita Jaya	
2015	Adhi Pratama	C	Indonesia	Pelita Jaya	
2016	Jamarr Andre Johnson^	F	Indonesia United States	CLS Knights	
2017	Arki Dikania Wisnu^	F	Indonesia	Satria Muda (3)	
2018	Xaverius Prawiro	G	Indonesia	Pelita Jaya (4)	
2019	Kaleb Gemilang^	F	Indonesia	Stapac Jakarta (3)	
2020	Abraham Damar Grahita^	G	Indonesia	Indonesia Patriots	
2021	Jamarr Andre Johnson^ (2)	F	Indonesia United States	Louvre Dewa United	
2022	Abraham Damar Grahita^ (2)	G	Indonesia	Prawira Bandung (3)	
2023	Kaleb Gemilang^ (2)	F	Indonesia	Dewa United	
2024	Abraham Damar Grahita^ (3)	G	Indonesia	Satria Muda (4)	
2025	Agassi Goantara^	G	Indonesia	Pelita Jaya (5)	
2026	Rio Disi^	G	Indonesia	Dewa United (2)	

== Awards won by club ==
Club	Total
Pelita Jaya	5
Satria Muda	4
Stapac	3
Prawira Bandung	3
Bhinneka Solo	2
Dewa United	2

== See also ==
- IBL Foreign Player of the Year
- All-IBL Indonesian Team
- IBL Rookie of the Year
