= Daniel Wenas =

Indonesian professional basketball player

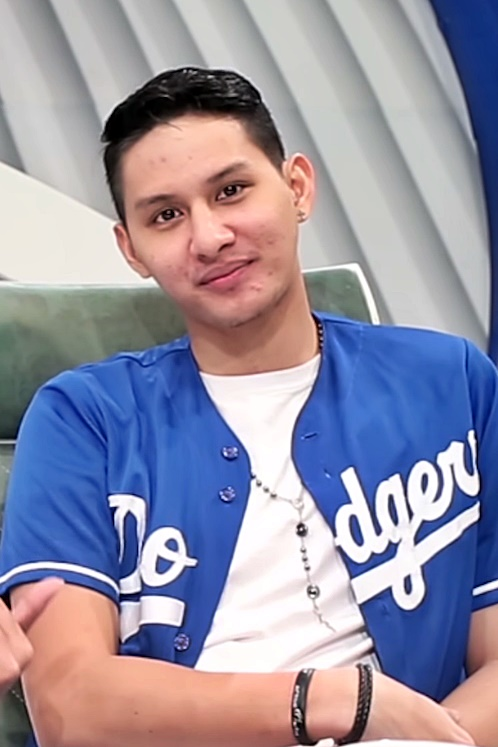
- Daniel Wenas in 2019

No. 5 – Bogor Hornbills
- Position: Point guard / shooting guard
- League: IBL

Personal information
- Born: August 8, 1992 (age 34) Jakarta, Indonesia
- Listed height: 190 cm (6 ft 3 in)
- Listed weight: 81 kg (179 lb)

Career information
- High school: SMAN 3 (Jakarta, Indonesia)
- College: Perbanas Institute (2011-2016)
- Playing career: 2011–present

Career history
- 2011-2014: Pelita Jaya
- 2014-2016: Garuda Bandung
- 2016-2018: Pelita Jaya
- 2018-2019: Bogor Siliwangi
- 2019-2020: Louvre Surabaya
- 2020-2021: Bali United Basketball
- 2021-2022: Evos Thunder Bogor
- 2022-2024: Amartha Hangtuah
- 2024-present: Borneo Hornbills / Bogor Basketball

Career highlights
- 2× IBL champion (2017, 2026); 2× IBL All-Star (2017, 2020); All-IBL Indonesian First Team (2020)
Medals
Men's basketball
Representing Indonesia
ASEAN University Games
Gold medal – first place	2014 Palembang	Team
Gold medal – first place	2016 Singapore	Team
Test Event Asian Games
Gold medal – first place	2018 Jakarta	Team

Daniel Timothy Wenas (born August 8, 1992) is an Indonesian professional basketball player for the Bogor Hornbills of the Indonesian Basketball League (IBL). He mainly plays both guard positions and on occasion, also plays the small forward position.

== Early career ==
Daniel Wenas started playing basketball at the age of 13. In 2005, he joined Bulls Jakarta a junior basketball club to start his junior career and was a member there for three years until 2008. In 2008, he joined Merah-Putih Jakarta and stayed there for a year. In 2009, he then recruited by his future professional team, Pelita Jaya's Junior Team and was promoted to the main team in 2011, during his freshman year at University.

== High school career ==
Daniel Wenas attended Negeri 3 Jakarta of high school where he led his team to first place in U-16 Kejurnas in 2007 and 2008 and in U-18 Kejurnas in 2009 as a junior. He also led his team to first place for the annual Pop-Mie Basketball National Championship from 2007 to 2009.

=== Sophomore year ===
In 2008 during his sophomore season, his team went to the final and played against Negeri 09 Bandung of high school from Bandung. Despite falling behind during the first quarter, Negeri 3 Jakarta of high school under their coach Julisa Rastafari broke through and came out victorious with the final score of 74 - 61 and grabbed the 2008 Pop-Mie Basketball National Championship.

=== Junior year ===
In 2009, Daniel Wenas and his team played in the final and were matched against Ananda high school of Batam from Batam at the famous BritAma Arena. Negeri 3 Jakarta of high school's defense was exploited and the score was even at 41 at half time. However, Negeri 3 Jakarta of high school closed out the game with an 82 - 81 win through Prastawa game winning free-throw, and grab the 2009 Pop-Mie Basketball National Championship.

=== Senior year ===
Daniel Wenas returned to Negeri 3 Jakarta of high school in 2010 to complete his education. Despite still being in the basketball team, he and the other senior members were not allowed to participate in national competition to focus on their academics. During this time, he was also selected to Indonesia National Team for Asean School Games 2010.

== Professional career ==
=== Pelita Jaya Esia (2011 - 2014) ===
==== Rookie Season (2011 - 2012) ====
Daniel Wenas was immediately recruited to play professionally for Pelita Jaya after graduating high school and during his freshman year at Perbanas Institute. He made his professional debut on 11 December 2011 against JNE Bandung Utama and scored 8 points together with 8 rebounds, 1 assist and 2 steals in 16 minutes. He scored a season high 17 points 118 - 64 victory on 1 February 2012 against NSH Jakarta. He finished his rookie season averaging 5.7 points, 2.6 rebounds, 0.8 assist, 0.8 steal and 0.1 block, playing mainly as the backup Small-Forward for the team.

==== 2012 - 2013 Season ====
Daniel Wenas returned to Pelita Jaya for his second season and scored a season high 18 points again, against NSH Jakarta on 16 January 2013 and brought his team to a 73 - 38 blowout win. He ended the regular season with an average of 5.6 points, 1.8 rebounds, 0.45 assist, 0.45 steal, and 0.08 block. He then helped his team reach the 2013 NBL Final to play against Aspac Jakarta led by his former high-school teammate, the rookie of the year, Andakara Prastawa. During the final, Daniel Wenas only played 10 minutes and scored 4 points as his team was eliminated with the score of 50 to 63.

==== Injury-Plagued Season (2013 - 2014) ====
During a daily practice in late August 2013, Daniel Wenas suffered a torn ACL and lateral meniscus and had to miss the whole of the upcoming season. He had a surgery done in early September at Moro Lorenzo Sports Center @ Ateneo de Manila University located at Quezon City, Philippines.

=== Garuda Bandung (2014 - 2016) ===
==== Comeback Season (2014 - 2015) ====
After missing the whole of 2013 - 2014 season, Daniel Wenas signed with a new team Garuda Bandung. He made his debut for Garuda on 3 December 2014 against Pacific Caesar Surabaya scoring 6 points off the bench. Later that month, Daniel Wenas was selected to Indonesian National Team to compete in 2014 ASEAN University Games at Palembang, Indonesia. Daniel Wenas helped Indonesia to win the gold medal by defeating Thailand in the gold medal match. He scored a career high, 23 points and made 4 out of his 63-point attempts to beat Hangtuah Sumsel with the final score of 67 - 52. He finished the season averaging 6.3 points, 2.8 rebounds, 1 assist, 0.8 steals and 0.2 block. Garuda entered the playoff as the fifth seed and was matchup against the fourth-seeded Aspac Jakarta in the first round. Garuda was defeated by Aspac 51 - 68. They then played against Stadium Jakarta in the losing bracket before losing to them 52 - 58 and thus eliminated from the playoff.

==== Transitioning to Indonesian Basketball League (2015 - 2016) ====
The 2015 - 2016 season was a transitional season for the Indonesian's professional basketball league as they re-branded themselves back to Indonesian Basketball League. Development Basketball League (DBL) discontinued their management rights of the league. PERBASI then appointed Starting5 Sports Entertainment to manage the league and hired Hasan Gozali as the commissioner of the new league. It was during this year that Daniel Wenas started transitioning from his usual small forward position to playing both guard positions. His coach, Fictor Roring occasionally trusted, Daniel Wenas to run the team offense as their backup point guard behind the veteran, Wendha Wijaya. On 29 April 2016, Daniel Wenas scored a career high 24 points and career high 6 steals to go along with 8 rebounds and 4 assists. With high expectation, Garuda entered the playoffs as the 5th seed with a 22 - 11 record and were matched up against the 4th seeded Satria Muda Pertamina Jakarta team that was led by Arki Wisnu. Garuda however was eliminated in two games in a best-of-three format.

=== Return to Pelita Jaya (2016 - 2018) ===
==== All-Star & Championship season (2016 - 2017) ====
Towards the end of the off-season of 2016, Daniel Wenas requested a trade to his old team, Pelita Jaya. It was no longer possible for Wenas to stay with Garuda from his financial standpoint. He was then traded to Pelita Jaya for future all-star, Januar Kuntara. Daniel Wenas was joined by his old coach, Fictor Roring as he was hired by Pelita Jaya to be the General Manager of the team. This was also the year where IBL finally allowed each team to draft 2 foreign players. Pelita Jaya used their picks to draft a guard, Martavious Irving from Kansas State University and Kore White from University of South Florida. That year, Daniel Wenas experienced a decline in almost all of his statistics as he took a lesser role than when he was during his time with Garuda Bandung. His team however, entered the playoff as the first seed in the White Group and was immediately qualify to play in the group stage Final. Daniel Wenas helped his team to swept Aspac Jakarta in 2 games and went on to face the Red Group's champion, Satria Muda Pertamina Jakarta in the final. Pelita Jaya won game one, 63 to 57 however, they lost game two and with the season on the line, Pelita Jaya willed themselves to win the series 72 to 62 against their long-time rival and winning their first ever championship at the IBL-NBL Era.

==== Return to the final (2017 - 2018) ====
Building the success from the previous season, Daniel Wenas and his team went on to the United States for training camp at Impact Basketball that was located at Las Vegas, Nevada for one week. Despite winning the championship, Pelita Jaya decided not to bring back neither of their 2 foreign players from the previous season and used their draft picks to draft a big-guard, Wayne Bradford from Davenport University and big man, Merril Holden from Iowa State University. Holden was however, replaced by e.x. Los Angeles Lakers's player, C. J. Giles during the off-season. During the same off-season, Pelita Jaya signed Xaverius Prawiro whom ended up becoming the MVP of the 2017-18 season and another valuable, versatile big man in Valentino Wuwungan. This season, Wenas was promoted as their starting Shooting Guard and started the season strongly, posting a consecutive double-double on 4 and 5 January 2018. His team won league's best 16 - 1 record and entered the playoff again as the first seed in the White Group. Daniel Wenas again faced Aspac, this time led by Kore White in the semi-final and nearly losing to them in an overtime game 3, elimination game. The final was a rematch from last year, however, this time Satria Muda Pertamina Jakarta was powered by Indonesia's naturalised national-team player, Jamarr Johnson and Dior Lowhorn who defeated Daniel Wenas and his team in 3 games. During the playoff, Daniel Wenas did not score a single point throughout the entire playoff.

=== Bogor Siliwangi (2018 - 2019) ===
==== Breakout-season and club dismissal (2018 - 2019) ====
During the off-season of 2018, Daniel Wenas weighed his options on whether to return to Pelita Jaya or sign with a new team. On 8 October 2018, Daniel Wenas announced his decision to join the newly, reformed Bogor Siliwangi whom had just relocated to Bogor from Bandung through his Youtube Channel. He explained that his primary reason for not renewing his contract with Pelita Jaya is to be able to get a bigger role and more playing time, something that Pelita Jaya will not be able to accommodate, especially after signing Daniel Wenas' old high school teammate, and the reigning Sixth-man of the Year in Andakara Prastawa. Despite Siliwangi being the worst team in the previous season with 0 win, Daniel Wenas believed that this will be a challenge worth taking and also an opportunity for him to prove himself that he can be a national-team level player. He performed very strongly during the pre-season with an average of 14.25 points, 9.0 rebounds and 3.25 assists to go with 1.75 steals in 32 minutes of playing time. He finished the season averaging career-high in points and minutes played, his team however, missed the playoff making this season the first time in Daniel Wenas' career to miss the post-season. Daniel Wenas, along with all the members of Bogor Siliwangi became a free-agent in mid-2019 due to the club's dismissal. The cause of the dismissal was mainly due to financial and many of the players' salary were paid late.

=== Louvre Surabaya (2019 - present) ===
==== New Chapter with a brand new team (2019 - 2020) ====
After months of being a free-agent, speculations and discussion arose on which team Wenas will be playing for the upcoming season. Along with his free-agency, the league was transitioning into a new era with many of the older, more established team such as Stapac Jakarta withdrawing out due to not having enough experience player in their roster as many of the players were called to play for the national team. In late October, Louvre Surabaya, a new expansion team for Indonesian Basketball League officially announce Daniel Wenas as their first ever player and expected him to be the cornerstone of the new team. Wenas made his debut for Louvre during 2019 Indonesia President's cup.

== International career ==
Daniel Wenas made his national team debut when he was selected to Indonesia National Team for FIBA Asia U-18 in 2008. In 2010, he again represented Indonesia in ASEAN School Games. In September 2012, Daniel Wenas represented DKI Jakarta and won the bronze medal in the Pekan Olahraga Nasional XVIII (PON 18) national tournament.

He helped Indonesia to win the gold medals for both 2014 ASEAN University Games at Palembang and 2016 ASEAN University Games at Singapore, both times defeating Thailand in the final.

In February 2018, Daniel Wenas was selected to participate in 2018 Asian Games Test Event and made his official senior Indonesian National Team debut defeating Timor Leste 135 - 30. Indonesia managed to earn gold medal for the Test Event by beating India, 78 - 68 in the final.

== Career statistics ==
Legend
GP	Games played	GS	Games started	MPG	Minutes per game
FG%	Field goal percentage	3P%	3-point field goal percentage	FT%	Free throw percentage
RPG	Rebounds per game	APG	Assists per game	SPG	Steals per game
BPG	Blocks per game	PPG	Points per game	**Bold**	Career high

†	Denotes seasons in which Wenas won an IBL championship
*	Led the league

=== Regular season ===
==== NBL/IBL ====
Years	Teams	GP	Min	FG%	3P%	FT%	APG	RPG	SPG	BPG	PPG
2011 - 2012	Pelita Jaya	16	12.2	34.3	29.7	56.2	0.8	2.6	0.8	0.1	5.7
2012 - 2013	Pelita Jaya	24	10.1	**40.7**	31.3	80.0	0.5	1.8	0.5	0.1	5.6
2013 - 2014	Pelita Jaya	0	0.0	0.0	0.0	0.0	0.0	0.0	0.0	0.0	0.0
2014 - 2015	Garuda Bandung	31	14.6	35.7	30.2	75.5	1.0	2.8	0.8	0.2	6.3
2015 - 2016	Garuda Bandung	**32**	24.6	32.0	30.0	68.0	**2.9**	4.5	1.1	0.2	10.8
2016 - 2017	Pelita Jaya	15	16.9	36.0	27.0	56.0	1.9	**5.1**	0.9	0.2	5.6
2017 - 2018	Pelita Jaya	17	21.9	40.0	30.0	50.0	2.7	4.7	0.8	0.1	5.4
2018 - 2019	Bogor Siliwangi	18	31.3	33.0	31.0	81.0	2.0	3.7	1.2	**0.3**	12.4
2019 - 2020	Louvre Surabaya	14	**32.0**	41.0	**33.0**	**89.0**	1.1	4.5	0.9	0.0	**11.4**
2020 - 2021	Bali United	0	0.0	0.0	0.0	0.0	0.0	0.0	0.0	0.0	0.0
2021 - 2022	Evos Thunder	22	27.3	28.2	22.4	67.7	2.0	4.6	**1.23**	0.1	7.45
2022 - 2023	RJ Amartha Hangtuah Jakarta	6	21.0	25.0	15.4	37.5	1.0	2.7	0.8	0.0	2.8

==== Playoffs ====
Years	Teams	GP	Min	FG%	3P%	FT%	APG	RPG	SPG	BPG	PPG
2012	Pelita Jaya	2	5.3	0.0	0.0	0.0	0.5	1.5	0.8	0.1	0.0
2013	Pelita Jaya	4	11.3	39.3	12.5	75.0	0.0	3.0	1.0	0.0	7.5
2015	Garuda Bandung	2	22.5	37.5	37.5	**100.0**	1.0	4.5	0.5	0.0	8.5
2016	Garuda Bandung	2	**34.3**	28.0	14.0	69.0	1.0	3.5	0.0	0.0	**12.5**
2017	Pelita Jaya	**5**	19.9	**41.0**	**36.0**	50.0	**1.2**	**4.8**	**1.0**	**0.4**	5.2
2018	Pelita Jaya	4	5.0	0.0	0.0	50.0	0.3	1.0	0.0	0.0	0.0

=== International ===
Year	Competition	GP	Min	FG%	3P%	FT%	APG	RPG	SPG	BPG	PPG
2014	**2014 ASEAN University Games**	5	0.0	0.0	0.0	0.0	0.0	0.0	0.0	0.0	0.0
2016	**2016 ASEAN University Games**	5	0.0	0.0	0.0	0.0	0.0	0.0	0.0	0.0	0.0
2018	Test Event Asian Games 2018	4	0.0	0.0	0.0	0.0	0.0	0.0	0.0	0.0	0.0
Career		14.0	0.0	0.0	0.0	0.0	0.0	0.0	0.0	0.0	0.0
