= Arki Dikania Wisnu =

Indonesian basketball player (born 1988)

Arki Wisnu
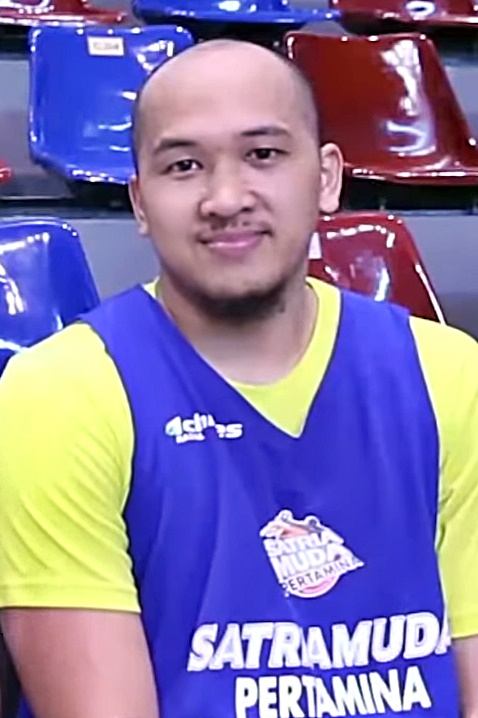
- Arki in 2019

No. 33 – Dewa United Banten
- Position: Point guard / small forward
- League: IBL

Personal information
- Born: 15 March 1988 (age 38) New York City, New York, U.S.
- Listed height: 6 ft 2 in (1.88 m)
- Listed weight: 200 lb (91 kg)

Career information
- High school: Newtown (Elmhurst, New York)
- College: Baruch (2006–2011)
- Playing career: 2011–present

Career history
- 2011-2024: Satria Muda Pertamina
- 2019-2020: Indonesia Patriots
- 2024-present: Dewa United Banten

Career highlights
- ABL champion (2012); 4× IBL champion (2018, 2021, 2022, 2025); 2× NBL Indonesia champion (2012, 2015); 2× NBL Indonesia Finals MVP (2012, 2015); IBL Most Valuable Player (2017); IBL Sixth Man of the Year (2020); 8× IBL All-Star (2017-2020, 2022, 2023, 2025, 2026); 5× All-IBL Indonesian First Team (2016-2018, 2021, 2025); 3× All-IBL Indonesian Second Team (2020, 2022, 2023); All-NBL Indonesia First Team (2012); NBL Indonesia Rookie of the Year (2012); NBL Indonesia Sixth Man of the Year (2012)
Medals
Men's basketball
Representing Indonesia
SEABA Championship
Silver medal – second place	2017 Manila	Team
SEA Games
Gold medal – first place	2021 Vietnam	Team
Silver medal – second place	2015 Singapore	Team
Silver medal – second place	2017 Kuala Lumpur	Team
SEABA Cup
Silver medal – second place	2012 Thailand	Team
2021 FIBA Asia Cup SEABA Pre-Qualifier
Gold medal – first place	2018 Nonthaburi	Team
Test Event Asian Games
Gold medal – first place	2018 Jakarta	Team

Arki Dikania Wisnu (born March 15, 1988) is an American-born Indonesian professional basketball player for Dewa United Banten of the Indonesian Basketball League (IBL). He played a total of 13 seasons for Satria Muda Pertamina, and helped them win five championships. He played college basketball for the Baruch Bearcats, which makes him one of the few Indonesians who has played in the National Collegiate Athletic Association (NCAA).

== Early career ==
Wisnu was born in New York City, United States on March 15, 1988, to an Indonesian parents. Wisnu played soccer and didn't start playing basketball until he was 12 years old and only after being influenced by his cousin to pick up the sport. With time, he continued to improve his game and eventually joined a tryout for his high school's varsity team, Newtown High School at Queens, New York. During his freshman year, he was in the school's junior varsity team and was promoted to the varsity team during his sophomore year. He was appointed to be the captain of the team for his Junior and Senior year. He had a career game of 28 points, 9 rebounds and 9 assists against Grover Cleveland High School and another career game with 19 points and 20 rebounds against Franklin K. Lane High School.

== College career ==
=== Freshman year (2006–07) ===
Wisnu was awarded a scholarship by Baruch College to play for their basketball team, the Bearcats in the National Collegiate Athletic Association's Division III. He immediately made an impact during his freshman year by averaging 6.2 points in 26 games while starting 4 of the games. Wisnu scored a career high 16 points against Farmingdale State College on February 12, 2007. He also had a career game of 13 points and 9 rebounds during his freshman season against the Brevard College from NCAA Division II. He ended the season by being selected as Baruch Men's Basketball Rookie of the Year.

=== Sophomore year & red-shirt season (2007–09) ===
Wisnu returned for his sophomore year with Baruch college and had a dropped in his statistic. He only averaged 3.6 points in 22 games and 1 start. Wisnu decided to redshirt the 2008–09 season as he was at Indonesia for one and a half month for a tryout with his future professional team, Satria Muda Pertamina Jakarta whom was very impressed by Wisnu's versatility and skills. The owner, Erick Thohir even went as far as offering Wisnu a contract immediately in which he rejected as he wanted to finish his education first.

=== Junior and senior season (2009–11) ===
He rejoined the team for his third season with the team. During that season, Baruch had a record of 23–7 and they eventually won the 2010 ECAC Metro Postseason Championship, defeating York College in the final with the score of 93–70. He also returned for his senior year at Baruch. That season, his team went 15–12 and was eliminated in the first round of the ECAC tournament against Stevens Institute of Technology.

== Professional career ==
=== Satria Muda Pertamina Jakarta (2011-2019)/Indonesia Warriors (2012-2013)/ Indonesia Patriots (2019-present) ===
==== Rookie season (2011-12) ====
After graduating from college, Wisnu finally joined Satria Muda Pertamina Jakarta for the upcoming 2011-12 NBL (Indonesia) season after the club had kept a close watch on Wisnu and he finally signed his first professional contract. His debut game was against Garuda Bandung on December 10, 2011. In the game he scored 8 points and grabbed 5 rebounds for his ever professional win. He scored a season high 23 points on 15 January 2012 in a loss against CLS Knights Surabaya. Wisnu immediately made an impact for the team as he dominated the league by averaging 13.8 points, 6.9 rebounds, 2.5 assists and 1.8 steals in his rookie season. He won the Rookie of the Year and Sixth Man of the Year award at the end of his rookie season. He was also selected to the All NBL Indonesia First Team. Wisnu and the Satria Muda entered the playoff as the first seed with 28 wins and 5 losses. Wisnu led his team to the finals where they faced the second seeded Aspac Jakarta led by Pringgo Regowo. Wisnu scored 17 points, to go with 4 rebounds and 2 assists as he led his team to victory and won the 2011-12 NBL Championship. For his effort, he was awarded the NBL Indonesia Finals MVP.

==== First ABL stint (2012) ====
On May 11, 2012, Wisnu, along with his teammate Christian Ronaldo Sitepu were called by the Indonesia Warriors from the Asean Basketball League to join their roster for the rest of the 2012 ABL season and the 2012 ABL playoffs. The Warriors swept the first round against AirAsia Philippine Patriots and faced San Miguel Beerman in the final led by their import superstar player, Duke Crews. The Beerman defeated the Warriors in the first game, however the Warriors managed to rally back and won the next 2 games to win their first ever ABL championship. Wisnu scored 4 points in the final third game. By winning the ABL championship, Wisnu and his teammate Sitepu created history by becoming the first players to ever win the domestic league's championship and an international league's championship on the same year.

==== Shortcoming seasons (2012-14) ====
Wisnu returned to Satria Muda hoping to build on the success of the previous season. Wisnu however under-performed during the preseason and missed the entire first series of the 2012–13 season at Bandung. He made his season debut during the Jakarta series on January 16, 2013, against Hangtuah Sumsel where he scored 13 points. He scored a season-high 27 points and 11 rebounds the very next game against the red-hot Aspac Jakarta in a rematch from last year's final and brought his team to a 68–65 win, handing Aspac their only loss of that season. He ended the season averaging 10.2 points, 4.2 rebounds and 2.7 assists in the 20 games he played in. Satria Muda entered the playoff as the third seed with 25 wins and 8 losses. They were then eliminated in the quarterfinal against Pelita Jaya Energi Mega Persada.

Wisnu missed the entire 2013-14 preseason series at Surabaya. He made his season debut on November 26, 2013, against Aspac during the Malang series where he only scored 2 points in 6 minutes and 30 seconds of playing time. On February 13, 2014, Wisnu joined the 1000 points club against NSH Jakarta during the Solo series. On April 26, 2014, Wisnu scored a career high 32 points while also grabbing 9 rebounds with an 80% field goal percentage and leading his team to an 89-62 blowout win in a revenge game against Pelita Jaya. Satria Muda entered the playoff as the first seed with 29 wins and only 4 losses. The team went on to once again reach the final and had a final rematch from 2 season ago against Aspac Jakarta. This time however, led by the back-to-back seasons' Rookie of the Year and Sixth Man of the Year winners in Andakara Prastawa and Ebrahim Enguio Lopez, Aspac defeated Wisnu and Satria Muda 83–67 in a blowout loss in which Wisnu only managed to score 3 points.

==== Second ABL stint (2014) ====
That summer, Wisnu was then called again by the Indonesia Warriors to rejoin their team for the 2014 ABL season which began on 16 July 2014. Wisnu played a much bigger role for this season compared to his previous stint during the 2012 ABL season where he only played 4 games during the playoff. In total, he played a total of 8 games with 5 starts and averaged 9.2 points, 3.9 rebounds and 2.3 assists in 24.9 minutes. That year the Indonesia Warriors finished with a record of 9 wins and 11 loss and missed the 2014 ABL playoff.

==== Return to the top (2014–15) ====
During the 2014–2015 Indonesian Basketball League season, in a game against NSH Jakarta, Arki had a triple double of 10 points, 10 assists and 11 rebounds. He is only the second player in the league to record a triple double in a single game. Later that season, On March 15, 2015, Wisnu scored a season high 21 points against Pelita Jaya. Wisnu led Satria Muda Pertamina Jakarta again to the playoff as the first seed with 31 wins and only 2 losses. Although his scoring average dropped, Wisnu averaged a career high in assist during the 2014–15 season. He met with Aspac on the second round, this time however, Wisnu and his team came out victorious after beating them 59–53. Wisnu advanced to the finals to face Pelita Jaya Energi Mega Persada led by last season's regular season MVP in Ponsianus Nyoman Indrawan and the reigning MVP in Adhi Pratama. The scores were tied 54–54 in the last 44 seconds, when Wisnu tipped in a missed shot by his teammate, Rony Gunawan to give Satria Muda a 56–54 lead. Later with 14 seconds left, Wisnu sealed the game by grabbing an offensive rebound and scoring the second chance point from a missed free-throw by his teammate and gave his team a 61–54 lead. Satria Muda won the game 62-54 and Wisnu won his second championship and Finals MVP.

==== Transitioning to IBL (2015–16) ====
After the 2014–15 season, DBL Indonesia decided not to renew their sponsorship which ended the National Basketball League. In response to this, PERBASI appointed Starting5 Sports Entertainment to manage the league and also renamed the league to Indonesian Basketball League. Perbasi also hired Hasan Gozali to be the new commissioner of IBL.

Wisnu and Satria Muda finished the 2015–16 season as the forth seed with 23 wins and 10 losses, the lowest seeding Wisnu had even entered the playoff with. They swept their first round against the fifth seeded Garuda Bandung in which Wisnu tallied 20 points, 12 rebounds and 4 assists in the deciding game. They were however swept on the next round against the eventual champion, CLS Knights Surabaya led by their duo of Jamarr Johnson and Mario Wuysang.

==== MVP Season (2016–17) ====
During the 2016 off-season, the league finally allowed each team to select two import players, a guard and a big-man to improve the league's competitive standard. Satria Muda used its picks to draft Tyreek Jewell from St. Francis College and Carlos Smith from Bowie State University. The team also added sharpshooting rookie, Juan Laurent Kokodiputra from Pelita Harapan University. With improved roster, Wisnu led Satria Muda to finish the season as the top seed in the league with 13 wins and only 1 loss. Wisnu ended the season with an average of 10 points, 3.9 rebounds, 3.4 assists and career-high 2.1 steals. For his effort, he was awarded the league's Most Valuable Player award.

Satria Muda had a rematch against CLS Knights in the semi-final. This time however, they defeated CLS Knights in 3 games to move on to the final to face Pelita Jaya. Despite being the MVP of the season, Wisnu and his team were defeated at their home arena and were eliminated in 3 games.

==== First Championship in the IBL (2017–18) ====
Wisnu was injured throughout the 2017–18 season. However, despite not having Wisnu for half the season, Satria Muda still finish the season as the top seed on its division and second best seeding overall with 15 wins and 2 losses. Despite the injury, Wisnu still made a huge impact when he played and ended the season averaging career high in 3-point percentage with 38.0%. He was also selected as an All-star and All-Indonesian First Team.

Being the first seed made Satria Muda immediately qualified for the semi-final where they faced Hangtuah Sumsel led by their exciting foreign duo of Nashon George, Keenan Palmore and the 2017-18 Rookie of The Year, Abraham Wenas. Satria Muda defeated Hangtuah in 3 games and move on to face the top seeded Pelita Jaya again in the final led by the league's MVP, Xaverius Prawiro. Wisnu and Satria Muda won their first game at home 73–63 to lead the series in 1–0. They then faced Pelita Jaya at their home, Gor Mahasiswa Soemantri Brojonegoro for the next 2 games. Wisnu lost game 2 in a blowout 78–94 loss. Satria Muda then rallied together and beat Pelita Jaya 69–64 to win the championship and preventing a back-to-back final defeat to Pelita Jaya. This championship is Wisnu's fourth championship of his professional career and the very first in the IBL.

==== All-star selection (2018–19) ====
Wisnu was again selected as an all-star starter for the 2019 IBL all-star game alongside his teammates, Jamarr Johnson and Dior Lowhorn.

== National team ==
Arki is a member of Indonesian basketball team in the 2012 SEABA Cup, 2015 Southeast Asian Games, 2017 SEABA Championship and 2017 SEA Games.

== Career statistics ==
Legend
GP	Games played	GS	Games started	MPG	Minutes per game
FG%	Field goal percentage	3P%	3-point field goal percentage	FT%	Free throw percentage
RPG	Rebounds per game	APG	Assists per game	SPG	Steals per game
BPG	Blocks per game	PPG	Points per game	**Bold**	Career high

†	Denotes seasons in which Wisnu won an NBL/IBL championship
*	Led the league

=== NBL/IBL ===
==== Regular season ====
Year	Team	GP	MPG	FG%	3P%	FT%	RPG	APG	SPG	BPG	PPG
2011–12	Satria Muda Pertamina	**32**	-	.360	.200	.650	**6.9**	2.5	1.8	**0.6**	**13.8**
2012–13	Satria Muda Pertamina	20	-	.400	.170	.640	4.2	2.7	1.5	0.4	10.2
2013–14	Satria Muda Pertamina	29	-	.430	.270	.670	5.1	2.0	0.9	0.4	9.2
2014–15	Satria Muda Pertamina	31	-	.440	.250	.680	5.2	**3.8**	1.2	0.4	8.2
2015-16	Satria Muda Pertamina	29	21.4	.440	.340	**.800**	5.4	3.7	1.6	0.3	10.6
2016-17	Satria Muda Pertamina	12	19.8	.450	.250	.710	3.9	3.4	**2.1**	0.0	10.0
2017-18	Satria Muda Pertamina	8	20.8	.460	.380	.500	4.0	3.2	1.6	0.2	9.2
2018-19	Satria Muda Pertamina	16	21.6	.480	.140	.790	3.4	3.2	0.8	0.3	6.9
2019-20	Indonesia Patriots	12	20.7	**.490**	**.428**	.732	3.5	2.7	1.3	0.3	7.1
2020-21	Satria Muda Pertamina	16	**24.5**	.485	.275	.720	6.5	**3.8**	1.2	0.5	12.7
2021-22	Satria Muda Pertamina	21	21.4	.397	.310	.754	3.7	**3.8**	1.2	0.3	8.9

==== Playoffs ====
Year	Team	GP	MPG	FG%	3P%	FT%	RPG	APG	SPG	BPG	PPG
2012	Satria Muda Pertamina	4	-	45%	45%	70%	4.5	3.3	1.6	0.3	**16.8**
2013	Satria Muda Pertamina	3	-	41%	28%	60%	5.3	2.7	1.3	0.0	15.3
2014	Satria Muda Pertamina	4	-	**50%**	33%	**80%**	2.0	2.5	1.6	0.0	8.8
2015	Satria Muda Pertamina	4	-	40%	33%	73%	6.0	2.3	1.5	0.0	11.0
2016	Satria Muda Pertamina	4	**30.22**	40%	38%	50%	**7.7**	**4.7**	**2.7**	**0.7**	14.0
2017	Satria Muda Pertamina	3	18.73	31%	**50%**	**80%**	4.7	2.3	1.7	0.0	7.0
2018	Satria Muda Pertamina	6	22.68	27%	29%	68%	3.3	2.7	1.0	0.0	7.8
2019	Satria Muda Pertamina	7	28.45	49%	18%	75%	4.0	4.6	1.6	0.3	14.6
2021	Satria Muda Pertamina	5	26.87	**50%**	27%	75%	5.2	2.8	0.8	0.6	15.6

Legend
GP	Games played	GS	Games started	MPG	Minutes per game
FG%	Field goal percentage	3P%	3-point field goal percentage	FT%	Free throw percentage
RPG	Rebounds per game	APG	Assists per game	SPG	Steals per game
BPG	Blocks per game	PPG	Points per game	**Bold**	Career high

†	Denotes seasons in which Wisnu won an ABL championship
*	Led the league

=== ABL ===
==== Regular season ====
Year	Team	GP	MPG	FG%	3P%	FT%	RPG	APG	SPG	BPG	PPG
2014	Indonesia Warriors	8	24.9	.440	.280	.310	3.9	2.3	0.6	0.4	9.2

==== Playoffs ====
Year	Team	GP	MPG	FG%	3P%	FT%	RPG	APG	SPG	BPG	PPG
2012	Indonesia Warriors	4	6.6	.500	.200	1.000	0.8	.0	.0	.0	3.3

== International career statistics ==
=== International ===
Year	Competition	GP	MPG	FG%	3P%	FT%	RPG	APG	SPG	BPG	PPG
2015	SEA Games										
2017	SEA Games										
2017	Southeast Asia Basketball Association Championship	2	12.7	61.9%	33.3%	71.4%	1.5	3.0	0.0	1.0	9.0
2018	2021 FIBA Asia Cup SEABA Pre-Qualifier	4	16.3	37%	25%	100%	2.8	1.0	0.8	1.3	7.0
2018	William Jones Cup	7	24.9	.352	.286	.833	3.4	1.3	0.7	0.4	10.6
2018	Asian Games	7									
