= Mei Joni =

Indonesian basketball player

No. 17 – RANS Simba Bogor
- Position: Shooting guard / small forward
- League: IBL

Personal information
- Born: 7 May 1989 (age 37)
- Listed height: 1.88 m (6 ft 2 in)
- Listed weight: 83 kg (183 lb)

Career information
- Playing career: 2011–present

Career history
- 2011–2017: Hangtuah Sumsel Indonesia Muda
- 2017–2019: Stapac Jakarta
- 2020–2023: West Bandits Solo
- 2025-present: RANS Simba Bogor

Career highlights
- IBL champion (2019); 2× IBL All-Star (2019, 2020)
Medals
Men's basketball
Representing Indonesia
Silver medal – second place	2015 Singapore
Gold medal – first place	2016 Singapore
Silver medal – second place	2017 Kuala Lumpur

Mei Joni (born 7 May 1989) is an Indonesian professional basketball player who plays for RANS Simba Bogor of the Indonesian Basketball League (IBL).

== Club career ==
Mei Joni formerly played for Amartha Hangtuah and Stapac Jakarta.

In December 2020, Mei Joni joined the Indonesian Basketball League's newcomer club West Bandits Solo.

== National team ==
Mei Joni has been a member of the Indonesian national basketball team, which he served as team captain.

== Player profile ==
Jap Ricky Lesmana, head coach at the West Bandits, stated that he values Mei Joni's defence and shooting ability.

== Career statistics ==
Legend
GP	Games played	GS	Games started	MPG	Minutes per game
FG%	Field goal percentage	3P%	3-point field goal percentage	FT%	Free throw percentage
RPG	Rebounds per game	APG	Assists per game	SPG	Steals per game
BPG	Blocks per game	PPG	Points per game	**Bold**	Career high

†	Denotes seasons in which Wisnu won an NBL/IBL championship
*	Led the league

=== NBL/IBL ===
==== Regular season ====
Year	Team	GP	MPG	FG%	3P%	FT%	RPG	APG	SPG	BPG	PPG
2011–12	Hangtuah Sumsel	28	–	35.5	20.0	85.7	4.1	1.1	1.1	0.4	7.4
2012–13	Hangtuah Sumsel	32	–	34.0	32.9	82.3	6.0	1.6	1.0	0.3	8.6
2013–14	Hangtuah Sumsel	32	–	33.7	26.2	82.9	4.4	1.5	1.0	0.2	4.6
2014–15	Hangtuah Sumsel	33	–	36.1	29.7	83.6	4.6	1.6	0.7	0.3	7.7

==== Playoffs ====
Year	Team	GP	MPG	FG%	3P%	FT%	RPG	APG	SPG	BPG	PPG
2011–12	Hangtuah Sumsel	2	–	53.8	20.0	0.0	5.0	0.5	0.0	0.5	7.5
2012–13	Hangtuah Sumsel	2	–	10.5	0.0	75.0	6.5	1.0	1.5	0.0	3.5
2013–14	Hangtuah Sumsel	2	–	42.1	25.0	60.0	4.5	3.0	3.5	0.5	10.5
2014–15	Hangtuah Sumsel	3	–	51.8	50.0	75.0	2.0	0.3	0.6	0.6	12.6
