= Mario Gerungan =

Indonesian former basketball player

Personal information
- Born: May 20, 1987 (age 39) Jakarta, Indonesia
- Listed height: 180 cm (5 ft 11 in)
- Listed weight: 73 kg (161 lb)

Career information
- High school: SMAN 22 East Jakarta (Jakarta, Indonesia)
- College: Esa Unggul University
- Playing career: 2007–2021
- Position: Point guard
- Number: 3

Career history
- 2007–2017: Aspac Jakarta
- 2021: Tangerang Hawks

Career highlights
- As player: 2× NBL Indonesia champion (2013, 2014)

Dirk Mathew Mario Gerungan (born 20 May 1987), is an Indonesian former professional basketball player. He is currently a sports commentator for the Indonesian Basketball League (IBL). He formerly played for the Indonesia national team.

== Professional career ==
=== Aspac Jakarta ===
Mario, or Dirk, has been with Aspac Jakarta's junior team since 2000 and moved up to the senior team in the 2007 season. With Aspac, Mario Gerungan has won numerous titles, including the 2012-2013 and 2013-2014 NBL Indonesia championships. During the 2011-12 season, Gerungan averaged 7.8 PPG, 2.5 APG, and 2.2 SPG. He was one of the team's leading scorers. However, after Aspac won the 2012-13 championship, Gerungan's role shifted from scorer to facilitator. This was because Aspac had rookie, Andakara Prastawa in that season. Gerungan's points dropped to 3.9 PPG, but his assists rose to 3.5 APG.

=== Tangerang Hawks ===
Since 2017, Mario has been inactive as a professional player. After several seasons away, the Tangerang Hawks surprisingly brought Mario back to the IBL. "Actually, I never left basketball. For me, basketball is like life; there's a time to attack and a time to defend," said Mario. When he decided to return to playing with the Tangerang Hawks, Mario had one goal, He wanted to have a positive impact on younger players.

== National team career ==
Gerungan represented the Indonesia men's national basketball team in the 2011 FIBA Asia Championship in Wuhan, China and also in the 2014 FIBA Asia Cup, and was a member of the 2011 SEA Games team.

== Personal life ==
After retiring, Mario became a sports commentator for the IBL, a decision he said was surprising for him. It started as him being a impromptu host, and then ended up being the official commentator of the IBL.
