= Faisal Julius Achmad =

Indonesian basketball player

Faisal Achmad
Personal information
- Born: 13 December 1981 (age 44) Jakarta, Indonesia
- Listed height: 1.80 m (5 ft 11 in)
- Listed weight: 165 lb (75 kg)

Career information
- High school: SMAN 2 (Tangerang, Indonesia)
- College: Perbanas Institute
- Playing career: 1999–2017
- Position: Point guard
- Number: 5, 8
- Coaching career: 2017–2019

Career history

Playing
- 1999-2002: Citra Satria Pelita
- 2002-2014: Satria Muda BritAma
- 2014-2017: Pelita Jaya

Coaching
- 2017-2019: Pelita Jaya (assistant)

Career highlights
- 5× IBL champion (2017, 2004, 2006-2009); 2× NBL Indonesia champion (2011, 2012); All-NBL Indonesia First Team (2011); NBL Indonesia Top assist (2011); NBL Indonesia All-Star MVP (2012); IBL All-Star MVP (2008); IBL Defensive Player of the Year (2007)
Medals
Men's basketball
Representing Indonesia
Southeast Asian Games
Silver medal – second place	2007 Nakhon Ratchasima	Team
Bronze medal – third place	2011 Jakarta	Team
SEABA Championship
Silver medal – second place	2005 Kuala Lumpur	Team

Faisal Julius Achmad (born December 13, 1981) is an Indonesian former professional basketball player who last played for Pelita Jaya of the Indonesian Basketball League (IBL). He is currently coaching Fictor Gideon Roring's academy.

== Personal life ==
Achmad is married to Rosye Margareth, and they have two children.

== National team career ==
Achmad represented the Indonesia national basketball team in the 2007 SEA Games at Nakhon Ratchasima, Thailand, and won the silver medal.
