= Isman Thoyib =

Indonesian basketball player

Personal information
- Born: August 18, 1984 (age 42) Klaten, Indonesia
- Listed height: 203 cm (6 ft 8 in)
- Listed weight: 91 kg (201 lb)

Career information
- High school: SMK Kristen 1 (Klaten, Indonesia)
- College: University of Perpetual Help System DALTA (2002-2004); Esa Unggul University (2008)
- Playing career: 2003–2022
- Position: Center

Career history
- 2003–2014, 2017-2019: Dell Aspac Jakarta
- 2015–2017: CLS Knights Surabaya
- 2020, 2021-2022: Bima Perkasa Jogja

Career highlights
- NBL Indonesia Defensive Player of the Year (2011); All-NBL Indonesia First Team (2012); 6× IBL/NBL Indonesia champion (2003, 2005, 2013, 2014, 2016, 2019)
Medals
Men's basketball
Representing Indonesia
SEA Games
Silver medal – second place	2007 Nakhon Ratchasima	Team
SEABA Championship
Silver medal – second place	2009 Medan	Team
SEABA Cup
Silver medal – second place	2014 Batam	Team

Muhammad Isman Thoyib (born August 18, 1984) is a former Indonesian professional basketball player. Played 19 season in the IBL, he won 6 championships with Dell Aspac Jakarta and was known for being the main center for the Indonesia national basketball team.

Thoyib competed for the Indonesia national basketball team at the FIBA Asia Championship 2009 for the first time. He averaged 2.6 points and 5.8 rebounds per game for the team.
