= Andi Poedjakesuma =

Indonesian basketball player

Andi Batam
Personal information
- Born: November 8, 1980 (age 46) Batam, Indonesia
- Listed height: 6 ft 1 in (1.85 m)

Career information
- High school: SMAN 3 (Jakarta, Indonesia)
- NBA draft: 2002: Undrafted
- Playing career: 1997–2016
- Position: Forward

Career history
- 1997-2009: Dell Aspac Jakarta
- 2009-2010: Garuda Speedy Bandung
- 2010-2016: Pelita Jaya Jakarta

Career highlights
- NBL Indonesia All-Star MVP (2012); 2× All-NBL Indonesia Second Team (2013, 2012); IBL All-Star MVP (2009); 3× Kobatama champion (2000, 2001, 2002); Kobatama Finals MVP (2000); 2× IBL champion (2003, 2005)
Medals
Men's basketball
Representing Indonesia
SEA Games
Silver medal – second place	2007 Nakhon Ratchasima	Team
Bronze medal – third place	2011 Jakarta-Palembang	Team

Andi "Batam" Poedjakesuma (born November 8, 1980) is a retired Indonesian professional basketball player. He was known for playing with the Dell Aspac Jakarta. He is also a member of the Indonesia national basketball team.

Andi competed for the Indonesia national basketball team at the FIBA Asia Championship 2007 for the first time; he returned to the team for the FIBA Asia Championship 2009.
