= I Made Sudiadnyana =

Former Indonesian basketball player

Personal information
- Born: 16 November 1970 (age 55) Singaraja, Bali, Indonesia
- Listed height: 1.88 m (6 ft 2 in)
- Listed weight: 78 kg (172 lb)

Career information
- Playing career: 1991–2012
- Position: Forward
- Number: 13

Career history
- 1991-1996: Bima Sakti Nikko Steel Malang
- 1997-2008: Bhinneka Sritex Solo
- 2008-2012: Garuda Bandung

Career highlights
- 8× Kobatama/IBL/NBL Most Valuable Player (1995, 1996, 1999, 2001, 2004, 2007, 2010, 2011); All-NBL Indonesia First Team (2011); IBL All-Star (2005)
Medals
Men's basketball
Representing Indonesia
Southeast Asian Games
Silver medal – second place	2007 Nakhon Ratchasima	Team
Silver medal – second place	2001 Kuala Lumpur	Team

I Made "Lolik" Sudiadnyana (born November 16, 1970) is an Indonesian former professional basketball player who last played for Garuda Bandung of the National Basketball League (NBL Indonesia). Lolik is known for being the oldest player winning the Most Valuable Player award at age 40. Based on sources, Lolik claims he collects a total of eight MVP award's.

== Professional career ==
Starting out practicing basketball in his hometown, Singaraja. He migrated to Malang and joined Bima Sakti Nikko Steel Malang to compete in the Kobatama, the highest level of competition in Indonesia at that time. He was they're star player from 1991 to 1996.

In 1997, Lolik moved to Solo to join Bhinneka Solo. His achievements became increasingly brilliant, he took Bhinneka to the Kobatama and IBL finals five times. Lolik was loyal to Bhinneka until the club disbanded in 2009 and merged with the Stadium Jakarta. A large picture of Lolik is displayed at GOR Bhinneka which is now called Sritex Arena.

Lolik moved to Garuda Bandung to compete in the inaugural NBL Indonesia. He even became the Most Valuable Player at the age of 40.

== National team career ==
Lolik was chosen to be the mainstay of the Indonesian national basketball team when they won silver medals at the 2001 SEA Games and the 2007 SEA Games.
