= Bima Sakti (disambiguation) =

Bima Sakti (born 1976) is an Indonesian football player.

Bima Sakti may also refer to:

- Indonesian for Milky Way
- Bima Perkasa Jogja, formerly Bima Sakti Malang, Indonesian basketball club
