= Barra Sugianto =

Indonesian basketball player

Personal information
- Born: March 19, 1992 (age 34) Denpasar, Bali, Indonesia
- Listed height: 6 ft 1 in (1.85 m)

Career information
- High school: SMAN 6 (Denpasar, Bali)
- Playing career: 2011–2016
- Position: Power forward

Career history

Playing
- 2011–2016: Bimasakti Yogyakarta / Bimasakti Nikko Steel Malang

Coaching
- 2020: Bima Perkasa Academy
- 2023: SMAN 6 Denpasar
- 2025-present: SMAN 1 Kuta Utara

Barra Sugianto (born March 19, 1992), is a former Indonesian professional basketball player. He last played for the Bimasakti Nikko Steel Malang club of the Indonesian Basketball League (IBL).

== National team career ==
He represented Indonesia's national basketball team at the 2016 SEABA Cup, where he was his team's best free throw shooter.

== Bimasakti Malang ==
He signed with Bimasakti Malang club to form the "big three" along with Yanuar Dwi Priasmoro and Bima Riski Ardiansyah. During the 2014-2015 Regular NBL Season, he scored a career high 24 points and grabbed 10 rebounds to help Bimasakti win against Stadium Jakarta. In the next two games, he scored 18 and 16 against Garuda Bandung and Satria Muda Pertamina Jakarta respectively, but couldn't get the wins.
