= Raymond Shariputra =

Indonesian basketball player

Free agent
- Position: Small forward

Personal information
- Born: 3 November 1991 (age 35) Bandung, West Java, Indonesia
- Listed height: 5 ft 11 in (1.80 m)
- Listed weight: 194 lb (88 kg)

Career information
- High school: SMA Kristen Diakonia (Jakarta, Indonesia)

Career history
- 2011-2013: Aspac Jakarta
- 2013-2016: Stadium Jakarta
- 2016-2017: Aspac Jakarta
- 2017-2022: Garuda Bandung
- 2022-2024: Bumi Borneo / Borneo Hornbills
- 2024-2025: Prawira Bandung

Career highlights
- 2× NBL Indonesia champion (2012, 2013)

Raymond Shariputra (born 3 November 1991) is an Indonesian professional basketball player who last played for Prawira Bandung of the Indonesian Basketball League (IBL).

Shariputra won two championships with the Aspac Jakarta in 2012 and 2013.
