= 2017 Indonesian Basketball League =

- League: Indonesian Basketball League
- Sport: Basketball
- TV partner(s): iNews TV; Trans 7

IBL Draft
- Top draft pick: DeChriston McKinney
- Picked by: CLS Knights Surabaya

Regular season
- Top seed: Satria Muda Pertamina Jakarta

2017 IBL Finals
- Champions: Pelita Jaya Energi Mega Persada
- Runners-up: Satria Muda Pertamina Jakarta

2017 IBL Indonesia seasons
- ← 2016 2017–18 →

The 2017 Indonesian Basketball League was the second season of the Indonesian Basketball League with Starting5 as a promoter of the league.

Pelita Jaya defeated Satria Muda Pertamina 3–1 in the final. This accomplishment was noteworthy as some of the team's best players had recently departed. These players included Andi Batam, Dimas Dewanto, and Kelly Purwanto.

== Team ==
Team	Head Coach	Sponsor	Captain	Home
CLS Knights Surabaya	(Indonesia) Wahyu Widayat Jati		(Indonesia) Sandy Febriansyakh	Surabaya
Pelita Jaya Energi Mega Persada	(Indonesia) Johannis Winar	Bakrie Group	(Indonesia) Ponsianus Nyoman Indrawan	Jakarta
Satria Muda Pertamina Jakarta	(Indonesia) Youbel Sondakh	Pertamina	(Indonesia) Arki Dikania Wisnu	Jakarta
Satya Wacana Salatiga	(Indonesia) Efri Meldi		(Indonesia) Budi Sucipto	Salatiga
Garuda Bandung	(Indonesia) Andre Yuwadi	Bank BJB	(Indonesia) Diftha Pratama	Bandung
JNE Siliwangi Bandung	(Indonesia) Fathoni	JNE	(Indonesia) Andre Tiara	Bandung
Hangtuah Sumatera Selatan	(Indonesia) Paul Mario Sanggor		(Indonesia) Andrie Ekayana	South Sumatra
Pacific Caesar Surabaya	(Indonesia) Bisih			Surabaya
Bimaperkasa Yogyakarta	(Indonesia) Andika Bastian Kosasih		(Indonesia) Yanuar Dwi Priasmoro	Yogyakarta
Aspac Jakarta	(Indonesia) A.F Rinaldo	W88 News	(Indonesia) Andakara Prastawa	Jakarta
NSH Jakarta	(Indonesia) Mayckel S.D Ferdinandus		(Indonesia) Azzaryan Pradhitya	Jakarta

== Transactions ==
=== Coach ===
Name	Club	New club
Fictor Gideon Roring	Garuda Bandung	Pelita Jaya Energi Mega Persada
Benjamin Alvarez Sipin III	Pelita Jaya Energi Mega Persada	None
Johannis Winar	Pelita Jaya Energi Mega Persada (ast. Coach)	Pelita Jaya Energi Mega Persada
A.F Rinaldo	None	Aspac Jakarta
Andre Yuwadi	Stadium Jakarta	Garuda Bandung
Oei Akiat	Bimasakti Nikko Steel Malang	None
Andika Bastian Kosasih	None	Bimas Perkasa Yogyakarta

=== Players ===
Name	Old club	New club
Respati Ragil Pamungkas	Satya Wacana Salatiga	Pelita Jaya Energi Mega Persada
Daniel Wenas	Garuda Bandung	Pelita Jaya Energi Mega Persada
Vinton Nolland	Satria Muda Pertamina	JNE Siliwangi Bandung
Ferdinand Damanik	Aspac Jakarta	JNE Siliwangi Bandung
Surliyadin	JNE Bandung Utama	Garuda Bandung
Luke Martinus	JNE Bandung Utama	Garuda Bandung
Firman Dwi Nugroho	Satya Wacana Salatiga	CLS Knights Surabaya
Yerikho Tuasela	Pacific Caesar Surabaya	CLS Knights Surabaya
Rizal Falconi	Garuda Bandung	Satria Muda Pertamina
Muhammad Dhiya Ul'haq	Garuda Bandung	Satria Muda Pertamina
Abraham Damar Grahita	Stadium Jakarta	W88 Aspac Jakarta
Achmad Syarif	CLS Knights Surabaya	NSH Jakarta
Ottu Ray	CLS Knights Surabaya	Bima Perkasa Yogyakarta
Kelly Purwanto	Pelita Jaya Jakarta	Hangtuah Sumsel
Fredy	Garuda Bandung	JNE Siliwangi Bandung
Hans Abraham	Satria Muda Pertamina	CLS Knights Surabaya
Raymond Shariputra	Stadium Jakarta	W88 Aspac Jakarta
Pringgo Regowo	Stadium Jakarta	W88 Aspac Jakarta
Ruslan	Stadium Jakarta	NSH Jakarta
Valentino Wuwungan	Stadium Jakarta	W88 Aspac Jakarta
Riza Raharjo	Satria Muda Pertamina	JNE Siliwangi Bandung
Okky Arista	CLS Knights Surabaya	Pacific Caesar Surabaya

== Format ==
Teams were divided into two groups: The White Group and the Red Group.

- Teams in the White Group played around 15-16 games; while in the Red Group played around 13-14 games.
- At the end of the classification round, the top three teams in each group will advance to the playoffs where the group winners will advance to the semifinals.
- The whole playoffs will be in a best-of-three format.

== Regular season ==
=== White Group ===
Pos	Team	Pld	W	L	PF	PA	PD	Pts	Qualification
1	Pelita Jaya Energi Mega Persada	15	11	4	1119	925	+194	26	Advance to the semi-finals
2	W88 Aspac Jakarta	15	10	5	1260	1223	+37	25	Advance to the best-of-three quarter-finals
3	Pacific Caesar Surabaya	15	9	6	1075	1009	+66	24	Advance to the best-of-three quarter-finals
4	Hangtuah Sumatera Selatan	15	6	9	1122	1189	−67	21 (Note: Head-to-head matchup: 1–1 Goal average: 0.943 for Hangtuah, 0.941 for NSH Jakarta. Either ways, still both teams are eliminated.)	Eliminated
5	NSH Jakarta	15	6	9	1166	1238	−72	21	Eliminated
6	Satya Wacana Salatiga	15	1	14	1008	1240	−232	16	Eliminated

Source: Sportstats
Rules for classification: Points, win-loss record, head-to-head matchup

=== Red Group ===
Pos	Team	Pld	W	L	PF	PA	PD	Pts	GB	Qualification
1	Satria Muda BritAma (Q)	14	13	1	1005	748	+257	27	—	Outright semi-finals
2	CLS Knights Surabaya (Q)	14	11	3	1024	883	+141	25	2	Advance to the best-of-three quarter-finals
3	Garuda Bandung (Q)	14	7	7	991	910	+81	21	6	Advance to the best-of-three quarter-finals
4	JNE Siliwangi Bandung (E)	14	4	10	868	1005	−137	18	9	Eliminated
5	Bima Perkasa Yogyakarta (E)	14	2	12	857	1125	−268	16	11	Eliminated

Source: Sportstats
Rules for classification: 1) Points; 2) Goal difference; 3) Number of goals scored;
(E) Eliminated; (Q) Qualified for the phase indicated

== Playoffs ==
The whole playoffs are in a best-of-three series.

Quarter-finals
(R2) CLS Knights Surabaya	2
(R3) Garuda Bandung	1
(W2) Pacific Caesar Surabaya	0
(W3) Aspac Jakarta	2

Semi-finals
(R1) Satria Muda BritAma	2
(WQF1) CLS Knights	1
(W1) Pelita Jaya	2
(WQF2) Aspac Jakarta	0

Finals
Pelita Jaya	2
Satria Muda BritAma	1

=== Quarterfinals ===
31 March 2017 Game 1	CLS Knights Surabaya	73–75 (Series: Garuda leads series, 1–0)	Garuda Bandung	Surabaya
14:00	Scoring by quarter: 17–19, 17–17, 20–23, 19–16
	Pts: Crew Jr. 25; Rebs: Crew Jr. 9 Asts: Wuysang 8 PIR: Smith 24	Boxscore		Arena: GOR Kertajaya

1 April 2017	vs.

== Awards ==
Award	Name	Club	National
MVP Local Player	Arki Dikania Wisnu	Satria Muda Pertamina Jakarta	Indonesia
MVP Import Player	Gary Jacobs Jr	NSH Jakarta	United States of America
Defensive Player of the Year	Nate Maxey	Satya Wacana Salatiga	United States of America
Sixth Man of the Year	Arif Hidayat	CLS Knights Surabaya	Indonesia
Rookie of the Year	Juan Laurent Kokodiputra	Satria Muda Pertamina Jakarta	Indonesia
Most Improved Player of the Year	Abraham Damar Grahita	Aspac Jakarta	Indonesia
Coach of the Year	Youbel Sondakh	Satria Muda Pertamina Jakarta	Indonesia

== All-Star Games ==
=== Pre-game ===
Skill-challenge champion : (Indonesia) Avan Seputra: Avan Seputra, Fanny Kalumata, Ali Budimansyah

Three-point contest champion : (Indonesia) Andakara Prastawa (Stapac Jakarta)

=== Half game ===
Slam-dunk contest champion : (United States) Tyreek Jewell (Satria Muda Pertamina)

=== Game ===
==== Red Division ====
Pos	Name	Club
Starters
F	(Indonesia) Mario Wuysang	CLS Knights
G	(United States) Tyreek Jewell	Satria Muda Pertamina
F	(Indonesia) Sandy Febriansyakh	CLS Knights
C	(Indonesia) (United States) Jamarr Andre Johnson	CLS Knights
G	(Indonesia) Arki Wisnu	Satria Muda Pertamina
Reserves
F	(United States) Tyrell Corbin	Bima Perkasa Jogja
G	(United States) Chris Ware	Garuda Bandung
G	(Indonesia) Diftha Pratama	Garuda Bandung
C	(Indonesia) Ferdinand Damanik	Siliwangi Bandung
C	(Indonesia) Christian Sitepu	Satria Muda Pertamina
Coach
	(Indonesia) Youbel Sondakh	Satria Muda Pertamina

==== White Division ====
Pos	Name	Club
Starters
G	(Indonesia) Andakara Prastawa	Stapac Jakarta
F	(United States) Jarron Crump	Satya Wacana Salatiga
F	(Indonesia) Daniel Wenas	Pelita Jaya
G	(Indonesia) Oki Wira Sanjaya	Stapac Jakarta
C	(Canada) Kevin Loiselle	Pacific Caesar
Reserves
G	(United States) Gary Jacobs	NSH Jakarta
F	(United States) Nate Barfield	NSH Jakarta
C	(Indonesia) Ponsianus Nyoman Indrawan	Pelita Jaya
G	(Indonesia) Abraham Damar Grahita	Stapac Jakarta
F	(Indonesia) Pringgo Regowo	Stapac Jakarta
Coach
	(Indonesia) AF Rinaldo	Stapac Jakarta

5 March 2017

Red Division 110, White Division 104

The BritAma Arena, Jakarta

==== Most Valuable Player ====
Country	Name	Team
(United States)	Tyreek Jewell	Satria Muda Pertamina

== Sources ==
1. http://mainbasket.com/2017/01/roster-lengkap-ibl-2017/
