= Yanuar Dwi Priasmoro =

Indonesian basketball coach and former player

Bima Perkasa Yogyakarta
- Title: Assistant coach
- League: IBL

Personal information
- Born: 11 January 1989 (age 37) Blitar, Indonesia
- Listed height: 6 ft 3 in (1.91 m)
- Listed weight: 88 kg (194 lb)

Career information
- High school: SMAK Diponegoro (Blitar, Indonesia)
- College: Merdeka Malang University
- Playing career: 2008–2023
- Position: Small forward / shooting guard
- Number: 15
- Coaching career: 2024–present

Career history

Playing
- 2008-2023: Bima Perkasa Jogja/Bima Sakti Malang

Coaching
- 2024-present: Bima Perkasa Jogja (assistant coach)

Career highlights
- As player: 2× IBL All-Star (2019, 2018); All-IBL Indonesian First Team (2019); 2× All-NBL Indonesia First Team (2012, 2015); 2× NBL Indonesia All-Star (2012, 2013); NBL Indonesia Most Valuable Player (2012); NBL Indonesia scoring champion (2012)

Yanuar Dwi Priasmoro (born January 11, 1989) is an Indonesian basketball coach for the Bima Perkasa Jogja of the Indonesian Basketball League (IBL), and was also a former player who won multiple awards.
