= Pringgo Regowo =

Indonesian basketball player

Personal information
- Born: 27 June 1987 (age 39) Jakarta, Indonesia
- Listed height: 1.90 m (6 ft 3 in)
- Listed weight: 212 lb (96 kg)

Career information
- High school: SMAN 13 (Jakarta, Indonesia)
- College: Perbanas Institute (2005-2010)
- Playing career: 2008–2024
- Position: Power forward / small forward

Career history
- 2008-2014: Aspac Jakarta
- 2015-2016: Stadium Jakarta
- 2016-2017: Aspac Jakarta
- 2020-2022: West Bandits Solo
- 2022-2024: Pelita Jaya

Career highlights
- IBL champion (2024); IBL All-Star (2017); NBL Indonesia Most Valuable Player (2013); 2× NBL Indonesia champion (2012, 2013); 2× All-NBL Indonesia First Team (2012, 2013); NBL Indonesia All-Star (2012); Libama Most Valuable Player (2007)
Medals
Men's basketball
Representing Indonesia
SEABA Cup
Silver medal – second place	2014 Batam	Team

Pringgo Regowo (born June 27, 1987) is an Indonesian former professional basketball player who last player for the Pelita Jaya Bakrie of the Indonesian Basketball League (IBL). He won the Most Valuable Player award in the NBL Indonesia 2013 season.

He represented Indonesia's national basketball team at the 2014 SEABA Cup.
