= 2016 Indonesian Basketball League =

- League: Indonesian Basketball League (IBL)
- Sport: Basketball
- TV partner: rtv

Regular season
- Regular Season: CLS Knights Surabaya
- Season MVP: Jamarr Andre Johnson (CLS Knights Surabaya)
- Top scorer: Jamarr Andre Johnson (CLS Knights Surabaya)

Championship Series
- Champions: CLS Knights Surabaya

IBL Indonesia seasons
- 2017 →

The 2016 Indonesian Basketball League was the eighth season under the name of IBL, a nationwide basketball competition which previously known as National Basketball League (NBL).

The league reverted to its former name after Azrul Ananda, the owner of PT DBL Indonesia did not renew his contract. The format was different, closer to what was done in the Philippines. Teams played each other twice rather than three times.

== Teams ==
Team	Home city	Head coach
Bimasakti Nikko Steel Malang	Malang	(Indonesia) Oei A Kiat
CLS Knights Surabaya	Surabaya	(Indonesia) Wahyu Widayat Jati
Garuda Bandung	Bandung	(Indonesia) Fictor Gideon Roring
Hangtuah Sumsel	Palembang	(Indonesia) Tondi Raja Syailendra (until Series III) (Indonesia) Paul Mario Sanggor (since Series IV)
JNE Bandung Utama	Bandung	(Indonesia) Octaviarro Romely Tamtelahitu
M88 Aspac Jakarta	Jakarta	(Indonesia) Jugianto Kuntardjo
NSH Jakarta	Jakarta	(Indonesia) Maykel Ferdinandus
Pacific Caesar Surabaya	Surabaya	(Indonesia) Bambang Susanto
Pelita Jaya EMP Jakarta	Jakarta	(Philippines) Benjamin Alvarezsipin
Satria Muda Pertamina Jakarta	Jakarta	(Indonesia) Cokorda Raka Satrya Wibawa
Satya Wacana Salatiga	Salatiga	(Indonesia) Efri Meldi
Stadium Happy 8 Jakarta	Jakarta	(Indonesia) Andre Yuwadi

== Schedule ==
Phase	Round	Date	Arena
Pre-season		24–29 November 2015	GOR C-Tra Arena, Bandung
Regular season	Series I	9–17 January 2016	Hall Basket Senayan, Jakarta
Regular season	Series II	29 January – 6 February 2016	GOR Bima Sakti, Malang
Regular season	Series III	20–28 February 2016	GOR Amongrogo, Yogyakarta
Regular season	Series IV	12–20 March 2016	GOR Sahabat, Semarang
Regular season	Series V	2–10 April 2016	GOR C-Tra Arena, Bandung
Regular season	Series VI	23 April – 1 May 2016	GOR Kertajaya, Surabaya
Playoffs	Quarter-finals	15–20 May 2016	BritAma Arena, Jakarta
Playoffs	Semi-finals	21–24 May 2016	BritAma Arena, Jakarta
Playoffs	Finals	26–29 May 2016	BritAma Arena, Jakarta

== Pre-season ==
=== Preliminary round ===
All times are local (UTC+7).

=== Group A ===
Pos	Team	Pld	W	L	Pts	
1	SM Pertamina	3	3	0	6	Qualified for the second round
2	M88 Aspac	3	2	1	5	Qualified for the second round
3	Garuda	3	1	2	4	
4	Pacific Caesar	3	0	3	3	

=== Group B ===
Pos	Team	Pld	W	L	Pts	
1	CLS Knights	3	3	0	6	Qualified for the second round
2	Stadium Happy8	3	2	1	5	
3	Hangtuah	3	1	2	4	
4	NSH	3	0	3	3	

=== Group C ===
Pos	Team	Pld	W	L	Pts	
1	PJ EMP	3	3	0	6	Qualified for the second round
2	JNE BU	3	2	1	5	
3	Satya Wacana	3	1	2	4	
4	Bimasakti	3	0	3	3	

=== Finals round ===
Semi-finals
28 November
M88 Aspac	96
CLS Knights	90
28 November
SM Pertamina	66
PJ EMP	74

Final
29 November
PJ EMP	62 OT
M88 Aspac	59
Third place
29 November
SM Pertamina	69
CLS Knights	66

=== Individual awards ===
Finals MVP
Ponsianus Nyoman Indrawan (Pelita Jaya Energi Mega Persada)

== Players ==
=== Foreign players ===
The teams were not allowed to have foreign players but were allowed to have a naturalized player of Indonesian descent.

Club	Player 1	Player 2	Dual Nationality
CLS Knights Surabaya	(United States) Jamarr Andre Johnson	-	(United States) Mario Wuysang (Australia) Heronimus Hiro Londa
Aspac Jakarta	(United States) Anthony Ray Hargrove Jr	-	(Philippines) Ebrahim Enguio Lopez
Pelita Jaya Energi Mega Persada	(United States) Anthony Wayne Cates Jr	-	(United States) Brandon Jawato
Satria Muda BritAma Jakarta	-	-	(United States) Arki Dikania Wisnu
Bimasakti Nikko Steel Malang	-	-	-
Muba Hangtuah Indonesia Muda Sumatera Selatan	-	-	-
JNE Bandung Utama	-	-	-
Pacific Caesar Surabaya	-	-	-
NSH GMC Jakarta	(United States) Michael Willie Gee	-	-
Garuda Bandung	-	-	-
Satya Wacana Metro LBC Bandung	-	-	-
Stadium Jakarta	-	-	-

== Regular season ==
=== Standings ===
Pos	Team	Pld	W	L	Pts	Qualification
1	CLS Knights Surabaya (Q)	33	31	2	64	Advance to the twice-to-beat quarter-finals
2	Pelita Jaya EMP Jakarta (Q)	33	28	5	61	Advance to the twice-to-beat quarter-finals
3	M88 Aspac Jakarta (Q)	33	25	8	58	Advance to the best-of-three quarter-finals
4	Satria Muda Pertamina Jakarta (Q)	33	23	10	56	Advance to the best-of-three quarter-finals
5	Garuda Bandung (Q)	33	22	11	55	Advance to the best-of-three quarter-finals
6	Stadium Happy 8 Jakarta (Q)	33	16	17	49	Advance to the best-of-three quarter-finals
7	Hangtuah Sumsel (Q)	33	15	18	48	Advance to the twice-to-win quarter-finals
8	Satya Wacana Salatiga (Q)	33	13	20	46	Advance to the twice-to-win quarter-finals
9	JNE Bandung Utama	33	11	22	44	
10	Bimasakti Nikko Steel Malang	33	7	26	40	
11	NSH Jakarta	33	6	27	39	
12	Pacific Caesar Surabaya	33	1	32	34	

Source: Indonesia Basketball League @iblindonesia
(Q) Qualified for the phase indicated

== Playoffs ==
Note: All times listed are in Indonesia Western Standard Time (IWST) (UTC+7).

=== Format ===
In the quarter-finals, the two highest-seeded teams in the series has the twice-to-beat advantage; in this case, the team with the twice to beat advantage needs to be beaten twice by its opponent, while it only has to win once, in a de facto 1–0 lead in a best-of-3 series. All other series has the best-of-three format. All games were played in BritAma Arena, Jakarta from 15 to 29 May 2016.

=== Bracket ===
Teams in bold advanced to the next round. The numbers to the left of each team indicate the team's seeding in the regular season, and the numbers to the right indicate the number of games the team won in that round.

Quarter-finals
1	**CLS Knights Surabaya**	1
8	Satya Wacana Salatiga	0
4	**Satria Muda Pertamina Jakarta**	2
5	Garuda Bandung	0
2	**Pelita Jaya EMP Jakarta**	1
7	Hangtuah Sumsel	0
3	**M88 Aspac Jakarta**	2
6	Stadium Happy 8 Jakarta	0

Semi-finals
1	**CLS Knights Surabaya**	2
4	Satria Muda Pertamina Jakarta	0
2	**Pelita Jaya EMP Jakarta**	2
3	M88 Aspac Jakarta	0

Finals
1	**CLS Knights Surabaya**	2
2	Pelita Jaya EMP Jakarta	1

=== Quarter-finals ===
==== (1) CLS Knights Surabaya vs. (8) Satya Wacana Salatiga ====
17 May
03:00 pm

Boxscore

**CLS Knights Surabaya**	**62**–52	Satya Wacana Salatiga
Scoring by quarter: 19–20, 17–8, 11–10, 15–14
Pts: Jamarr Andre Johnson 16; Rebs: Isman Thoyib 11; Asts: Mario Wuysang 8		Pts: Respati Ragil Pamungkas 17; Rebs: Ramadhan, Giay 8 each Asts: three players 4 each
**CLS Knights Surabaya wins series, 1–0**

BritAma Arena, Jakarta
Referees: Ilham Burhanuddin, Sedyo Mukti Wibowo, Henry Yulius Foenai

==== (2) Pelita Jaya EMP Jakarta vs. (7) Hangtuah Sumsel ====
15 May
03:00 pm

Boxscore

**Pelita Jaya EMP Jakarta**	**57**–51	Hangtuah Sumsel
Scoring by quarter: 18–11, 10–11, 17–11, 12–18
Pts: Ponsianus Nyoman Indrawan 22; Rebs: Ponsianus Nyoman Indrawan 8 Asts: Kelly Purwanto 5		Pts: Andrie Ekayana 13; Rebs: Tony Sugiharto 8 Asts: Andrie Ekayana 4
**Pelita Jaya EMP Jakarta wins series, 1–0**

BritAma Arena, Jakarta
Referees: Haryanto Sutaryo, Donald Francis Quinn, Arnaz Anggoro Saputro

==== (3) M88 Aspac Jakarta vs (6) Stadium Happy 8 Jakarta ====
15 May
05:00 pm

Boxscore

**M88 Aspac Jakarta**	**81**–58	Stadium Happy 8 Jakarta
Scoring by quarter: 18–13, 19–13, 23–19, 21–13
Pts: Ebrahim Enguio Lopez 20; Rebs: Ebrahim Enguio Lopez 7 Asts: Andakara Prastawa 7		Pts: Valentino Wuwungan 18; Rebs: Pringgo Regowo 8 Asts: Saputra, Ruslan 3
**M88 Aspac Jakarta leads series, 1–0**

BritAma Arena, Jakarta
Referees: Budi Marfan, Sedyo Mukti Wibowo, Johan Christiana

17 May
07:00 pm

Boxscore

Stadium Happy 8 Jakarta	64–**65**	**M88 Aspac Jakarta**
Scoring by quarter: 18–13, 13–20, 18–12, 15–20
Pts: Valentino Wuwungan 17; Rebs: Valentino Wuwungan 14; Asts: Fanny Budianto 5		Pts: Ferdinand Damanik 15; Rebs: Ferdinand Damanik 8 Asts: Fandi Andika Ramadhani 4
**M88 Aspac Jakarta wins series, 2–0**

BritAma Arena, Jakarta
Referees: Haryanto Sutaryo, Erwin Harahap, Yoce Ardiko

==== (4) Satria Muda Pertamina Jakarta vs (5) Garuda Bandung ====
15 May
07:00 pm

Boxscore

**Satria Muda Pertamina Jakarta**	**55**–52	Garuda Bandung
Scoring by quarter: 15–17, 12–14, 13–12, 15–9
Pts: Kevin Sitorus 13; Rebs: Arki Dikania Wisnu 9 Asts: Hardianus 6		Pts: Wenas, Falconi 12; Rebs: Muhammad Rizal Falconi 8 Asts: Wendha Wijaya 5
**Satria Muda Pertamina Jakarta leads series, 1–0**

BritAma Arena, Jakarta
Referees: Ilham Burhanudin, Erwin Harahap, Amin Bachtiar

17 May
05:00 pm

Boxscore

Garuda Bandung	40–**46**	**Satria Muda Pertamina Jakarta**
Scoring by quarter: 9–15, 12–8, 8–9, 11–14
Pts: Wendha Wijaya 14; Rebs: Muhammad Rizal Falconi 11; Asts: Diftha Pratama 3		Pts: Arki Dikania Wisnu 20; Rebs: Arki Dikania Wisnu 12; Asts: Arki Dikania Wisnu 4
**Satria Muda Pertamina Jakarta wins series, 2–0**

BritAma Arena, Jakarta
Referees: Budi Marfan, Donald Francis Quinn, Abdul Rajib

=== Semi-finals ===
==== (1) CLS Knights Surabaya vs. (4) Satria Muda Pertamina Jakarta ====
21 May
05:00 pm

Boxscore

**CLS Knights Surabaya**	**63**–48	Satria Muda Pertamina Jakarta
Scoring by quarter: 17–19, 10–12, 16–10, 20–7
Pts: Mario Wuysang 17; Rebs: Jamarr Andre Johnson 8 Asts: Mario Wuysang 9		Pts: Sitorus, Hardianus 9 Rebs: Kevin Sitorus 6 Asts: Hardianus 7
**CLS Knights Surabaya leads series, 1–0**

BritAma Arena, Jakarta
Referees: Ilham Burhanudin, Donald Francis Quinn, Abdurrahman Rajib

22 May
07:00 pm

Boxscore

Satria Muda Pertamina Jakarta	70–**76** (OT)	**CLS Knights Surabaya**
Scoring by quarter: 12–22, 8–14, 18–12, 23–13, Overtime: 9–15
Pts: Arki Dikania Wisnu 20; Rebs: Christian Ronaldo Sitepu 11; Asts: Arki Dikania Wisnu 6		Pts: Jamarr Andre Johnson 19; Rebs: Jamarr Andre Johnson 14; Asts: Mario Wuysang 7
**CLS Knights Surabaya wins series, 2–0**

BritAma Arena, Jakarta
Referees: Budi Marfan, Donald Francis Quinn, Haryanto Sutaryo

==== (2) Pelita Jaya EMP Jakarta vs. (3) M88 Aspac Jakarta ====
21 May
07:00 pm

Boxscore

**Pelita Jaya EMP Jakarta**	**76**–55	M88 Aspac Jakarta
Scoring by quarter: 23–12, 20–11, 18–13, 15–19
Pts: Adhi Pratama 20; Rebs: Tri Hartanto 9 Asts: Dimas Aryo Dewanto 7		Pts: Handri Satrya Santosa 17; Rebs: Fandi Andika Ramadhani 6 Asts: Andakara Prastawa 7
**Pelita Jaya EMP Jakarta leads series, 1–0**

BritAma Arena, Jakarta
Referees: Budi Marfan, Sedyo Mukti Wibowo, Johan Cristiana

22 May
05:00 pm

Boxscore

M88 Aspac Jakarta	58–**60**	**Pelita Jaya EMP Jakarta**
Scoring by quarter: 10–11, 18–20, 13–13, 17–16
Pts: Andakara Prastawa 26; Rebs: 4 players 5 each Asts: Andakara Prastawa 4		Pts: Ponsianus Nyoman Indrawan 11; Rebs: Indrawan, Pratama 8 each Asts: Kelly Purwanto 4
**Pelita Jaya EMP Jakarta wins series, 2–0**

BritAma Arena, Jakarta
Referees: Ilham Burhannudin, Sedyo Mukti Wibowo, Erwin Harahap

=== Finals: (1) CLS Knights Surabaya vs. (2) Pelita Jaya EMP Jakarta ===
26 May
07:00 pm

Boxscore

**Pelita Jaya EMP Jakarta**	**77**–70	CLS Knights Surabaya
Scoring by quarter: 13–22, 23–12, 19–16, 22–20
Pts: Adhi Pratama 26; Rebs: Adhi Pratama 14; Asts: Kelly Purwanto 6		Pts: Jamarr Andre Johnson 18; Rebs: Jamarr Andre Johnson 11; Asts: Mario Wuysang 8
**Pelita Jaya EMP Jakarta leads series, 1–0**

BritAma Arena, Jakarta
Referees: Budi Marfan, Ilham Burhannudin, Erwin Harahap

28 May
07:00 pm

Boxscore

**CLS Knights Surabaya**	**59**–54	Pelita Jaya EMP Jakarta
Scoring by quarter: 18–18, 13–17, 16–7, 12–12
Pts: Jamarr Andre Johnson 24; Rebs: Mario Wuysang 6 Asts: Mario Wuysang 8		Pts: Brandon Jawato 24; Rebs: Brandon Jawato 12; Asts: 3 players 2 each
**Series tied, 1–1**

BritAma Arena, Jakarta
Referees: Budi Marfan, Donald Francis Quinn, Haryanto Sutaryo

29 May
07:00 pm

Boxscore

Pelita Jaya EMP Jakarta	61–**67**	**CLS Knights Surabaya**
Scoring by quarter: 8–17, 14–23, 19–14, 20–13
Pts: Brandon Jawato 21; Rebs: Jawato, Indrawan 7 each Asts: Indrawan, Prihantono 4 each		Pts: Jamarr Andre Johnson 19; Rebs: Jamarr Andre Johnson 12; Asts: Mario Wuysang 5
**CLS Knights Surabaya wins series, 2–1**

BritAma Arena, Jakarta
Referees: Budi Marfan, Donald Francis Quinn, Haryanto Sutaryo

== Awards ==
- Most Valuable Player: Jamarr Andre Johnson, CLS Knights Surabaya
- Rookie of the Year: Jamarr Andre Johnson, CLS Knights Surabaya
- Sixth man of the Year: Andakara Prastawa, M88 Aspac Jakarta
- Defensive player of the Year: Firman Dwi Nugroho, Satya Wacana Salatiga
- Most Improved Player: Firman Dwi Nugroho, Satya Wacana Salatiga
- Coach of the Year: Efri Meldi, Satya Wacana Salatiga

== Statistics ==
Points

Rank	Name	Team	PPG
1	(United States) Jamarr Andre Johnson	CLS Knights Surabaya	15.2
2	(Indonesia) Andakara Prastawa	M88 Aspac Jakarta	14.7
3	(Indonesia) Respati Ragil Pamungkas	Satya Wacana Salatiga	14.4
4	(Indonesia) Firman Dwi Nugroho	Satya Wacana Salatiga	12.7
5	(Indonesia) Diftha Pratama	Garuda Bandung	12.7

Assists

Rank	Name	Team	APG
1	(Indonesia) Mario Wuysang	CLS Knights Surabaya	6.9
2	(Indonesia) Wendha Wijaya	Garuda Bandung	4.7
3	(Indonesia) Andakara Prastawa	M88 Aspac Jakarta	4.4
4	(Indonesia) Kelly Purwanto	Pelita Jaya EMP Jakarta	4.3
5	(Indonesia) Arki Dikania Wisnu	Satria Muda Pertamina Jakarta	3.6

Rebounds

Rank	Name	Team	RPG
1	(Indonesia) Galank Gunawan	Garuda Bandung	11.3
2	(Indonesia) Firman Dwi Nugroho	Satya Wacana Salatiga	10.2
3	(United States) Jamarr Andre Johnson	CLS Knights Surabaya	9.8
4	(Indonesia) Adhi Pratama	Pelita Jaya EMP Jakarta	7.9
5	(Indonesia) Muhammad Rizal Falconi	Garuda Bandung	7.7

Blocks

Rank	Name	Team	BPG
1	(Indonesia) Firman Dwi Nugroho	Satya Wacana Salatiga	3.3
2	(Indonesia) Muhammad Wardana	Pacific Caesar Surabaya	1.7
3	(Indonesia) Isman Thoyib	CLS Knights Surabaya	1.4
4	(United States) Jamarr Andre Johnson	CLS Knights Surabaya	1.1
5	(Indonesia) Adhi Pratama	Pelita Jaya EMP Jakarta	1.1
