= Dimas Dewanto =

Indonesian basketball player

Personal information
- Born: 2 May 1986 (age 40) Malang, Indonesia
- Listed height: 1.80 m (5 ft 11 in)
- Listed weight: 167 lb (76 kg)

Career information
- College: Brawijaya University
- Playing career: 2004–2016
- Position: Shooting guard
- Number: 10

Career history
- 2004-2010: Bima Sakti Nikko Steel Malang
- 2010-2016: Pelita Jaya

Career highlights
- All-NBL Indonesia Second Team (2013); NBL Indonesia All-Star (2013); IBL Rookie of the Year (2005)
Medals
Men's basketball
Representing Indonesia
Southeast Asian Games
Bronze medal – third place	2011 Jakarta	Team

Dimas Aryo Dewanto (born 2 May 1986) is an Indonesian former professional basketball player who last played for Pelita Jaya of the Indonesian Basketball League (IBL). He is known for his speed on and off the ball.

== Personal life ==
He is the son of Peny Sotyawati, and former basketball player Bambang Kusno.
