= Biboy Enguio =

Filipino-Indonesian basketball player

Ebrahim Lopez Enguio
Free agent
- Position: Shooting guard

Personal information
- Born: January 31, 1988 (age 38) Alabang, Muntinlupa, Philippines
- Listed height: 6 ft 0 in (1.83 m)
- Listed weight: 177 lb (80 kg)

Career information
- College: UE
- PBA draft: 2017: 3rd round, 27th overall pick
- Drafted by: Blackwater Elite
- Playing career: 2010–present

Career history
- 2011: Cobra Energy Drink Iron Men
- 2012: Boracay Rum Waves
- 2013–2016: Aspac Jakarta
- 2016: Tanduay Light Rhum Masters
- 2017: Marinerong Pilipino
- 2017–2018: CLS Knights Indonesia
- 2019–2020: Muntinlupa Cagers
- 2020–2021: NSH Mountain Gold Timika
- 2021: Muntinlupa Water Warriors
- 2022: Muntinlupa Cagers
- 2022–2023: Louvre Surabaya
- 2024: Davao Occidental Tigers
- 2024-2025: Tangerang Hawks

Career highlights
- NBL Indonesia champion (2014); 2× All-NBL Indonesia First Team (2014, 2015); NBL Indonesia Sixth Man of the Year (2014); NBL Indonesia Rookie of the Year (2014); NBL Philippines Most Valuable Player (2021); NBL Philippines Mythical Five (2021); MPBL All-Star (2022)
Medals
Men's basketball
Representing Indonesia
SEABA Cup
Silver medal – second place	2014 Batam	Team
Southeast Asian Games
Silver medal – second place	2015 Singapore	Team
Silver medal – second place	2017 Malaysia	Team

Ebrahim "Biboy" Lopez Enguio (born January 31, 1988) is a Filipino-Indonesian professional basketball player who last played for the Tangerang Hawks of the Indonesian Basketball League (IBL). He played college basketball for the UE Red Warriors in the University Athletic Association of the Philippines (UAAP).

== Early life ==
Ebrahim Lopez Enguio was born on January 31, 1988, in Alabang, Muntinlupa, Philippines. He is of Filipino and Indonesian descent. His father, a Manado-native is an Indonesian citizen while his mother is of native Filipino descent.

== College career ==
As the youngest of six children, he claimed that his uncle taught him how to play basketball. Enguio's basketball career began at age 13 when he was in high school and played for a school team in Manila. It was then continued until he went to college and played for the University of the East Red Warriors in the University Athletic Association of the Philippines (UAAP).

== Amateur career ==
After his college career in the UAAP, Enguio played in the PBA Developmental League with the Cobra Energy Drink Iron Men and Boracay Rhum Waves (now Tanduay Light Rhum Masters) before moving to Indonesia.

== Professional career ==
=== NBL Indonesia ===
==== Aspac Jakarta ====
Enguio debuted in NBL Indonesia (currently Indonesian Basketball League) with Aspac Jakarta. At that time, he was predicted to be one of the best rookies in the league besides Ramot Gemilang who played for Satya Wancana. Enguio has been known to dunk in games. He did it for the first time at the Solo Series III while he dunked in the Series IV three times. In Series IV Bandung, he did an alley-oop dunk twice which was very rare in basketball games in Indonesia. In one of his games as a rookie, he recorded a double-double with 31 points, 10 rebounds, 1 assist and 3 blocks.

=== Return to the PBA D-League ===
==== Tanduay Light Rhum Masters ====
Enguio signed with the PBA Developmental League team Tanduay Light Rhum Masters for the 2016 Foundation Cup.

==== Marinerong Pilipino ====
Enguio signed with the team Marinerong Pilipino for the 2017 Foundation Cup.

== International career ==
As an Indonesian passport holder, Enguio is eligible and represents Indonesia in international basketball and in 2017, Enguio acquired Indonesian citizenship. He was part of the Indonesian squad the garnered second place at the 2015 Southeast Asian Games. In 2017, Enguio joined the training camp for the Indonesia national basketball team for the 2017 Southeast Asian Games. He also represented Indonesia in 3x3 basketball, playing in the 2018 FIBA 3x3 World Cup.

== Career statistics ==
=== Regular season ===
Year	Team	League	G	Min	FG%	3P%	FT%	APG	RPG	SPG	BPG	PPG
2013–14	Dell Aspac Jakarta	NBL Indonesia	27	-	46.7	24.0	57.6	1.6	5.8	1.7	0.9	12.9
2014–15	M88 Aspac Jakarta	NBL Indonesia	32	-	46.8	30.9	61.3	2.1	5.6	1.0	0.9	10.8
2016	M88 Aspac Jakarta	IBL Indonesia	25	21.82	40.0	28.0	64.0	1.9	5.5	0.9	0.6	7.5
2016	Tanduay Light Rhum Masters	PBA D-League	?	?	?	?	?	?	?	?	?	?
2017	Marinerong Pilipino	PBA D-League	?	?	?	?	?	?	?	?	?	?
2017–18	CLS Knights Indonesia	ABL	12	12.90	31.0	21.0	100.0	0.4	1.8	0.8	0.1	4.2
2019–20	Muntinlupa Cagers	MPBL	?	?	?	?	?	?	?	?	?	?
2021	NSH Mountain Gold	IBL	16	25.54	46.9	25.0	67.2	1.7	5.8	1.3	0.8	12.7

=== Playoffs ===
Year	Team	League	G	Min	FG%	3P%	FT%	APG	RPG	SPG	BPG	PPG	TPG
2014	Dell Aspac Jakarta	NBL Indonesia	4	-	52.0	35.7	70.0	2.0	6.0	1.3	0.8	15.5	1.5
2015	M88 Aspac Jakarta	NBL Indonesia	3	-	40.7	28.5	44.4	2.0	8.3	1.0	1.3	10.7	0.1
2016	M88 Aspac Jakarta	IBL Indonesia	3	20.65	43.0	50.0	55.0	0.7	4.7	0.7	0.3	8.7	0.3
