= 2011–12 NBL Indonesia season =

2011–12 Flexi NBL Indonesia
- League: NBL Indonesia
- Sport: Basketball
- Duration: September 23, 2011 – April 29, 2012
- TV partner(s): antv, Vision 1 Sports, Kompas TV (only All-Star Game), TVRI (only Final)

Regular season
- Regular season champions: Satria Muda Pertamina
- Season MVP: Yanuar Dwi Priasmoro (Bima Sakti Nikko Steel Malang)
- Top scorer: Yanuar Dwi Priasmoro

Championship Series
- Champions: Satria Muda Pertamina
- Runners-up: Aspac Jakarta
- Finals MVP: Arki Dikania Wisnu

NBL Indonesia seasons
- ← 2010–11 2012–13 →

The 2011–12 NBL Indonesia is the second season of the NBL Indonesia, a nationwide basketball competition which previously known as Indonesian Basketball League.

== Participating teams ==
- Satya Wacana Angsapura
- Dell Aspac Jakarta
- Stadium Jakarta
- Bima Sakti Malang
- CLS Knights
- Garuda Kukar Bandung
- Muba Hangtuah
- Pelita Jaya Energi-MP Jakarta
- SM BritAma
- Comfort Mobile BSC Jakarta
- NSH GMC Riau
- Pacific Caesar

== Awards ==
- Most Valuable Player: Yanuar Dwi Priasmoro (Bima Sakti Nikko Steel Malang)
- Defensive Player of the Year: Dimaz Muharri, CLS Knights
- Rookie of the Year: Arki Dikania Wisnu, Satria Muda Pertamina
- Sixth Man of the Year: Arki Dikania Wisnu, Satria Muda Pertamina
- Coach of the Year: Octaviarro Romely, Satria Muda Pertamina
- Sportsmanship Award: Max Yanto, NSH GMC Riau

- All-NBL First Team:
  - F Pringgo Regowo, Dell Aspac
  - G Arki Dikania Wisnu, Satria Muda Pertamina
  - C/F Christian Ronaldo Sitepu, Satria Muda BritAma
  - G Yanuar Dwi Priasmoro, Bima Sakti Malang
  - G Faisal Julius Achmad, Satria Muda Pertamina
  - C Isman Thoyib, Aspac Jakarta

- All-NBL Second Team:
  - G Kelly Purwanto, Pelita Jaya Jakarta
  - F Galank Gunawan, Satria Muda Pertamina
  - C/F Merio Ferdiansyah, Stadium Jakarta
  - F Andi Poedjakesuma, Pelita Jaya Jakarta
  - C/F Dian Heryadi, Muba Hangtuah

== All-Star Games ==
In the 2012 NBL Indonesia All-Star Game, they invited former NBA players, such as former Miami Heat and Sacramento Kings player, Jason "White Chocolate" Williams, a former NBA All-Star, Vin Baker, and former NBA Sixth Man of the Year, Ricky Pierce, Duane Causwell who had 11 years of experience playing in the NBA.

=== Game ===
==== Blue All-Star Team ====
Pos	Name	Club
G	(Indonesia) Kelly Purwanto	Pelita Jaya Jakarta
G	(Indonesia) Richardo Orlando Uneputty	Comfort Mobile BSC Jakarta
G	(Indonesia) Respati Ragil	Satya Wacana Salatiga
G	(Indonesia) Dirk Matthew Mario Gerungan	Dell Aspac Jakarta
F	(Indonesia) Pringgo Regowo	Dell Aspac Jakarta
F	(Indonesia) Ary Sapto	Muba Hangtuah IM Sumsel
F	(Indonesia) Andi Poedjakesuma	Pelita Jaya Jakarta
F	(Indonesia) Fandi Andika Ramadhani	Dell Aspac Jakarta
C	(Indonesia) Dian Heryadi	Muba Hangtuah IM Sumsel
C	(Indonesia) Isman Thoyib	Dell Aspac Jakarta
Coach
	(Indonesia) Rastafari Horongbala	Pelita Jaya Jakarta
	(Indonesia) Simon Wong	Satya Wacana Salatiga

==== Red All-Star Team ====
Pos	Name	Club
G	(Indonesia) Yanuar Dwi Priasmoro	Bimasakti Nikko Steel Malang
G	(Indonesia) Arki Dikania Wisnu	Satria Muda BritAma
G	(Indonesia) Dimaz Muharri	CLS Knights
G	(Indonesia) Vamiga Michel	Satria Muda BritAma
F	(Indonesia) Galank Gunawan	Satria Muda BritAma
F	(Indonesia) Rachmad Febri Utomo	CLS Knights
F	(Indonesia) Vinton Nolland Surawi	Garuda Bandung
F	(Indonesia) Ryan Febriyan	NSH GMC Riau
C	(Indonesia) Christian Ronaldo Sitepu	Satria Muda BritAma
C	(Indonesia) Agustinus Indrajaya	CLS Knights
Coach
	(Indonesia) Wan Amran	Garuda Bandung
	(Indonesia) Eddy Santoso	Pacific Caesar

==== Most Valuable Player ====
Country	Name	Team
(Indonesia)	Andi Poedjakesuma	Pelita Jaya Jakarta
