= Premier Basketball League (Indonesia) =

Premier Basketball League (PBL)
- Current season, competition or edition: 2013 PBL Indonesia
- Sport: Basketball
- Founded: 1982 as KOBATAMA
- First season: 2010-11
- Motto: Reborn
- No. of teams: 8
- Country: Indonesia
- Continent: FIBA Asia (Asia)
- Most recent champion: PIM NAD (1st title in PBL)

The Premier Basketball League (formerly: Kompetisi Bola Basket Utama or Kobatama), in Indonesian: Liga Bola Basket Utama, often abbreviated to the PBL, is the pre-eminent semi-professional men's basketball league in Indonesia, competed by 8 clubs across the country. It is organised by Board of PBL Indonesia and sanctioned by Perbasi (Indonesia Basketball Association).

The competition started as Kobatama in 1982. In 2010, Perbasi as the owner of this competition was no longer afford the highest amateur league. Driven by the spirit of togetherness to not suffer the same fate with KOBANITA, the KOBATAMA Council with 8 clubs participants 2009 KOBATAMA and the winner inter-club competitions 2009 National Basketball Championship Division I are determined to keep playing 2010/2011 season by forming a league to fill the void KOBATAMA named Premier Basketball League which is abbreviated PBL sanctioned by Perbasi, through decisions PERBASI Number 287/PB/XI year 2010 dated 1 November 2010 On Implementation of Appointment Letters Premier Basketball League. PBL 2010/2011 organized by the collective cost of 10 club participants, the competition uses a system of full competition two rounds with four compositions qualifying series, and the final four.

== Current clubs ==
In the Premier Basketball League (PBL) third season that will unfold in the year 2013, the number of PBL team four new teams would have to make sure yourself participates.

- PIM NAD (Aceh)
- Champ Bandung
- Cendrawasih Papua
- Banyuasin (South Sumatra)
- Scorpio Jakarta (new)
- Gelora Bahari Tegal (new)

== List of Champions ==
=== KOBATAMA Champions ===
Below is a list KOBATAMA champions from the first edition in 1982 to the last edition in 2002.

Year	Champions	Finals Result	Runners-up	Reference
1982	Indonesia Muda Jakarta	83-79	Halim Kediri	
1983	Indonesia Muda Jakarta	108-71	Halim Kediri	
1984-1985	Halim Kediri	54-49	Indonesia Muda Jakarta	
1988	Asaba Jakarta	79-71	Halim Kediri	
1989	Asaba Jakarta	52-51	Halim Kediri	
1990	Pelita Jaya		Asaba Jakarta (walkout)	
1991-1992	Pelita Jaya	60-53	Halim Kediri	
1992-1993	Asaba Jakarta	56-33	Halim Kediri	
1994	Hadtex Bandung	57-54	Aspac Jakarta	
1995	Aspac Jakarta	73-70	Hadtex Bandung	
1996	Aspac Jakarta	100-69	Panasia Indosyntec Bandung	
1997	Panasia Indosyntec Bandung	89-73	Bhinneka Sritex Solo	
1998	Hadtex Bandung	55-45	Aspac Jakarta	
1999	Mahaka Satria Muda	57-46	Bhinneka Sritex Solo	
2000	Aspac Jakarta	75-66	Panasia Indosyntec Bandung	
2001	Aspac Jakarta	87-72; 80-61	Bhinneka Sritex Solo	
2002	Aspac Jakarta	67-53; 68-51	Mahaka Satria Muda	

=== PBL Champions ===
Year	Champions	Final Score (Single Game)	Runners-up	Reference
2010-11	Cendrawasih Papua	62-56	Pacific Caesar	
2012	PIM NAD	90-39	Champ Bandung	
2013				

=== Number of championships won by clubs ===
Excluding KOBATAMA era.

Team	Championships	Runners-up
PIM NAD	1 (2012)	1 (2010-11)
Cendrawasih Papua	1 (2010-11)	0
Champ Bandung	0	1 (2012)

== List of MVP's ==
Years	Players	Teams	References
2010-11			
2012	Muhammad Akbar Aulia Ramadhan	PIM NAD	
2013	TBA		
