= Andakara Prastawa =

Indonesian basketball player

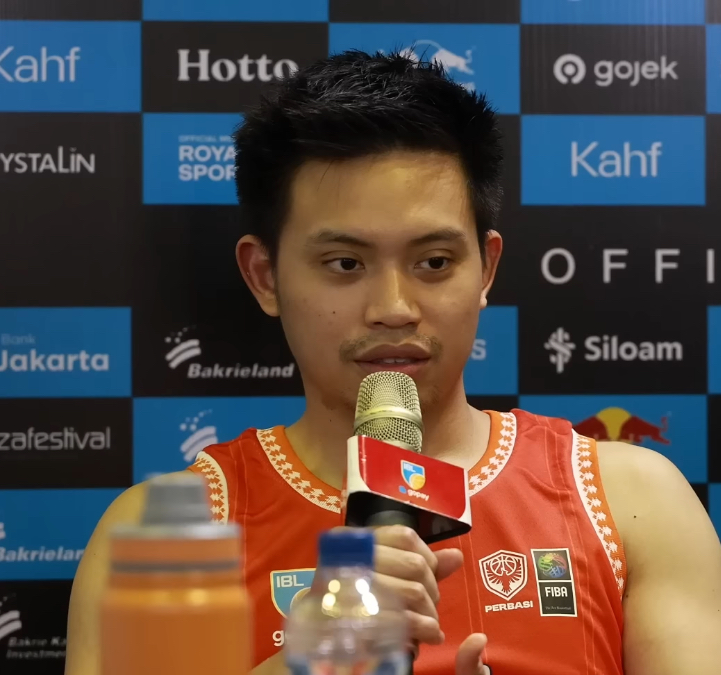
- Prastawa with Pelita Jaya in 2026

No. 7 – Pelita Jaya
- Position: Point guard / shooting guard
- League: IBL

Personal information
- Born: 16 August 1992 (age 34) Jakarta, Indonesia
- Listed height: 173 cm (5 ft 8 in)
- Listed weight: 73 kg (161 lb)

Career information
- High school: SMAN 3 (Jakarta, Indonesia)
- College: Bakrie University
- Playing career: 2012–present

Career history
- 2012-2018: Aspac Jakarta
- 2016: Mahameru Surabaya
- 2018-present: Pelita Jaya
- 2020-2021: Indonesia Patriots

Career highlights
- IBL champion (2024); 2× NBL Indonesia champion (2013, 2014); IBL Indonesia Cup champion (2022); NBL Indonesia Finals MVP (2013); 3× All-IBL Indonesian First Team (2016, 2017, 2026); All-NBL Indonesia First Team (2014); 3× All-IBL Indonesian Second Team (2021, 2022, 2023); 6× IBL All-Star (2017, 2019, 2020, 2023, 2024, 2026); NBL Indonesia All-Star (2013); 3× IBL Three-point Contest champion (2017, 2018, 2019); 3× IBL Sixth Man of the Year (2013, 2016, 2018); IBL Steals Leader (2021); NBL Indonesia Sixth Man of the Year (2013); NBL Indonesia Rookie of the Year (2013); SEABA Cup Top Assists (2014)
Medals
Men's basketball
Representing Indonesia
Islamic Solidarity Games
Bronze medal – third place	2013 Palembang	Team
SEABA Cup
Silver medal – second place	2014 Batam	Team
SEABA Championship
Silver medal – second place	2017 Manila	Team
SEA Games
Gold medal – first place	2021 Vietnam	Team
Silver medal – second place	2015 Singapore	Team
Silver medal – second place	2017 Kuala Lumpur	Team
Bronze medal – third place	2025 Thailand	Team

Andakara Prastawa Dhyaksa (born on August 16, 1992) commonly nicknamed Pras, is an Indonesian professional basketball player who currently plays for Pelita Jaya of the Indonesian Basketball League (IBL). He is generally regarded as one of the best players of Indonesia at his position. Prastawa was given the moniker Wonderkid.

He was voted NBL's 'Rookie of the Year' in 2013. In an IBL 2016 Series 4 game against Satria Muda Pertamina on 19 March 2016 in Semarang, M88 Aspac was trailing by four points in the last minutes of the fourth quarter. With seconds left, Prastawa made a contested three-point shot while being fouled, and then made a free-throw attempt to complete a four-point play and save Aspac from loss. He became a hero later that night after scoring another three-pointer in overtime to help Aspac defeat Satria Muda Pertamina with a score 81–72. He totalled 24 points to become the 'Man of the Match.'

== Professional career ==
=== NBL& IBL ===
In his first season he achieved 'Six Man of the Year'. He also became ASPAC club champion. He defended manji NBL Indonesia 2012–2013 season and almost won the MVP and top player in the NBL Score Indonesia that season. Child Of The ASPAC Dell coach once in high school and he entered the club 03 Jakarta Indonesia Muda when a Junior.

In March 2014 – 2015 NBL Season, he scored a career high of 32 points against Pelita Jaya but still lost the game 74–78. During that season he led his team with most points, averaging 11.8 points. However, Aspac lost to Stadium Jakarta during the championship series.

During the 2016 IBL Indonesia season, Prastawa averaged 14.7 points—second in the league behind Jamarr Andre Johnson. Aspac didn't qualify for the finals having lost to Pelita Jaya in a best of three series. Pelita Jaya advanced to the finals after winning the series 2–0.

=== Walikota Cup ===
Prastawa got a contract to play in the 2016 Walikota Cup Surabaya. He played alongside fellow first team in M88 Aspac is Oki Wira Sanjaya.

== International ==
Prastawa debuted for the national team of Indonesia in the current basketball arena. In the Islamic Solidarity Games in Palembang in 2013, he managed to win a bronze medal for the national team Indonesia. name is now also included in the 12 names below to Myanmar in the event the SEA GAMES.

== Career statistics ==
Legend
GP	Games played	GS	Games started	MPG	Minutes per game
FG%	Field goal percentage	3P%	3-point field goal percentage	FT%	Free throw percentage
RPG	Rebounds per game	APG	Assists per game	SPG	Steals per game
BPG	Blocks per game	PPG	Points per game	**Bold**	Career high

†	Denotes seasons in which Prastawa won an IBL championship
*	Led the league

=== NBL/IBL ===
==== Regular season ====
Year	Team	GP	MPG	FG%	3P%	FT%	RPG	APG	SPG	BPG	PPG
2012-13	Dell Aspac	32	-	37.8	35.7	83.3	2.2	2.0	2.1	**0.1**	**15.3**
2013-14	Dell Aspac	25	-	36.8	25.3	76.9	**3.7**	3.5	2.0	0.0	13.0
2014-15	M88 Aspac	**33**	-	36.7	27.2	77.8	2.9	3.9	1.3	**0.1**	11.8
2015-16	M88 Aspac	32	23.4	40.0	33.0	75.0	3.1	4.4	1.6	**0.1**	14.7
2016-17	W88 News Aspac	15	27.5	42.0	30.0	68.0	2.3	4.2	1.4	**0.1**	12.1
2017-18	Stapac Jakarta	16	20.6	33.0	25.0	**84.0**	2.6	3.1	0.9	0.0	8.1
2018-19	Pelita Jaya	16	**27.8**	37.0	32.0	77.0	3.2	3.8	1.7	**0.1**	10.7
2019-20	Indonesia Patriots	12	26.3	44.5	**41.9**	62.0	3.0	**4.8**	1.7	0.0	9.6
2020-21	Pelita Jaya	15	24.2	**47.3**	37.9	72.5	3.2	4.5	**2.7**	0.0	13.2
2021-22	Pelita Jaya	21	26.4	44.0	38.0	70.7	2.6	3.5	1.2	0.1	12.0

==== Playoffs ====
Year	Team	GP	MPG	FG%	3P%	FT%	RPG	APG	SPG	BPG	PPG
2013	Dell Aspac Jakarta	6	-	26.9	16.2	80.0	3.8	3.0	0.6	0.0	11.5
2014	Dell Aspac Jakarta	4	-	**43.8**	36.1	84.6	**5.5**	5.2	2.0	0.0	**24.7**
2015	M88 Aspac Jakarta	3	-	25.8	26.6	75.0	3.3	3.0	1.0	0.0	10.6
2016	M88 Aspac Jakarta	4	22.29	26.0	26.0	87.0	2.8	5.3	2.0	0.0	13.0
2017	W88 News Aspac Jakarta	4	22.07	27.0	23.0	**100.0**	4.0	4.5	**3.0**	0.0	10.5
2018	Stapac Jakarta	4	16.52	35.0	31.0	50.0	1.0	0.8	0.5	0.0	5.8
2021	Pelita Jaya	5	**31.34**	38.0	**37.5**	76.9	2.4	**5.8**	2.6	0.0	10.2
2021	Pelita Jaya	**7**	25.7	30.6	26.3	85.7	3.4	4.1	2.7	0.1	13.2
