= 2013–14 NBL Indonesia season =

2013–14 NBL Indonesia
- League: NBL Indonesia
- Sport: Basketball

Regular season
- Regular season champions: SM BritAma
- Season MVP: Ponsianus Nyoman Indrawan ( Pelita Jaya )
- Top scorer: Merio Ferdiansyah Sudrajat

Championship Series
- Champions: Aspac Jakarta
- Finals MVP: Andakara Prastawa Dhyaksa

NBL Indonesia seasons
- ← 2012–13 2014–15 →

The 2013–14 NBL Indonesia is the fourth season of NBL Indonesia, a nationwide basketball competition which previously known as Indonesian Basketball League (IBL).

== Participating teams ==
- Satya Wacana Metro Bandung
- Aspac Jakarta
- Stadium Jakarta
- Bima Sakti Malang
- CLS Knights
- Garuda Speedy Bandung
- Muba Hang Tuah
- Pelita Jaya Energi Mega Persada
- SM BritAma
- BSC Bandung Utama
- NSH GMC Riau
- Pacific Caesar

== Competition format ==
Participating teams compete in the regular season using home tournament format. The regular season divided into 6 series, each with different host cities. The top teams in final overall standings will continue to the championship playoffs.

There is also a pre-season warm-up tournament held before the regular season.

Series	Venue	Schedule
Series 1	Malang	16 Nov - 22 November 2013
Series 2	Jakarta	11–19 January 2014
Series 3	Solo	8–13 February 2014
Series 4	Bandung	7–15 March 2014
Series 5	Jakarta	19–27 April 2014
Series 6	Surabaya	9–18 Mei 2014

== Regular season ==
=== Standings ===
Pos	Team	Pld	W	L	PF	PA	Pts
1	Satria Muda	33	29	4	2507	1927	62
2	Aspac Jakarta	33	28	5	2436	1951	61
3	Pelita Jaya	33	27	6	2492	2174	60
4	CLS Knights	33	26	7	2476	1981	59
5	Garuda Kukar Bandung	33	20	13	2174	2004	53
6	Stadium Jakarta	33	16	17	2260	2341	49
7	Muba Hangtuah	33	14	19	2049	2049	47
8	Bima Sakti	33	12	21	1865	2254	45
9	BSC Bandung Utama	33	9	24	2023	2318	42
10	Satya Wacana	33	9	24	2169	2470	42
11	Pacific Caesar	33	6	27	1976	2454	39
12	NSH GMC Jakarta	33	2	31	1912	2479	35

== Statistics leaders ==
=== Individual statistic leaders ===
Category	Player	Team	Statistics/ Points
Points per game	Merio Ferdiansyah Sudrajat	Stadium Jakarta	18.12
Rebounds per game	Galank Gunawan	Garuda Kukar Bamdung	11.15
Assists per game	Dimaz Muharri	CLS Knights	5.94
Steals per game	Dimaz Muharri	CLS Knights	3.73
Blocks per game	Ponsianus Nyoman Indrawan	Pelita Jaya Energi Mega Persada	2.22

== Awards ==
- Most Valuable Player: Ponsianus Nyoman Indrawan, Pelita Jaya
- Defensive Player of the Year: Ponsianus Nyoman Indrawan, Pelita Jaya
- Rookie of the Year: Ebrahim Enguio Lopez, Aspac Jakarta
- Sixth Man of the Year: Ebrahim Enguio Lopez, Aspac Jakarta
- Coach of the Year: Occtaviarro Romely, JNE Bandung Utama
- Sportsmanship Award Rony Gunawan, Satria Muda

- All-NBL First Team:
  - G Dimazz Muharri, CLS Knights
  - G Merio Ferdiansyah, Stadium Jakarta
  - F Ponsianus Nyoman Indrawan, Pelita Jaya
  - F Bima Riski Ardiansyah, Bimasakti Nikko Steel Malang
  - C Rony Gunawan, Satria Muda
