= List of Indonesian Basketball League Champions =

The Indonesian Basketball League awards a championship trophy to the winning team at the end of each year.

== Winners ==
=== KOBATAMA Champions ===
Below is a list KOBATAMA champions from the first edition in 1982 to the last edition in 2002.

Year	Champions	Finals Result	Runners-up	Reference
1982	Indonesia Muda Jakarta	83-79	Halim Kediri	
1983	Indonesia Muda Jakarta	108-71	Halim Kediri	
1984–1985	Halim Kediri	54-49	Indonesia Muda Jakarta	
1988	Asaba Jakarta	79-71	Halim Kediri	
1989	Asaba Jakarta	52-51	Halim Kediri	
1990	Pelita Jaya		Asaba Jakarta (walkout)	
1991–1992	Pelita Jaya	60-53	Halim Kediri	
1992–1993	Asaba Jakarta	56-33	Halim Kediri	
1994	Hadtex Bandung	57-54	Aspac Jakarta	
1995	Aspac Jakarta	73-70	Hadtex Bandung	
1996	Aspac Jakarta	100-69	Panasia Indosyntec Bandung	
1997	Panasia Indosyntec Bandung	89-73	Bhinneka Sritex Solo	
1998	Hadtex Bandung	55-45	Aspac Jakarta	
1999	Mahaka Satria Muda	57-46	Bhinneka Sritex Solo	
2000	Aspac Jakarta	75-66	Panasia Indosyntec Bandung	
2001	Aspac Jakarta	87-72; 80-61	Bhinneka Sritex Solo	
2002	Aspac Jakarta	67-53; 68-51	Mahaka Satria Muda	

=== 2003–2009: IBL early years ===
Year	Champions	Finals Result	Runners-up	Reference
2003	Aspac Jakarta	2-0 (best-of-3)	Satria Muda BritAma	
2004	Satria Muda BritAma	2-0 (best-of-3)	Aspac Jakarta	
2005	Aspac Jakarta	2-0 (best-of-3)	Satria Muda BritAma	
2006	Satria Muda BritAma	2-0 (best-of-3)	Aspac Jakarta	
2007	Satria Muda BritAma	3-2 (best-of-5)	Aspac Jakarta	
2008	Satria Muda BritAma	3-1 (best-of-5)	Garuda Bandung	
2009	Satria Muda BritAma	3-1 (best-of-5)	Aspac Jakarta	

Italic indicates the club withdrew or no longer plays.

=== 2010–2015: NBL era ===
Year	Champions	Final Score (Single Game)	Runners-up	Reference
2010–11	Satria Muda BritAma	67-50	CLS Knights	
2011–12	Satria Muda BritAma	59-42	Aspac Jakarta	
2012–13	Aspac Jakarta	63-50	Pelita Jaya Jakarta	
2013–14	Aspac Jakarta	83-67	Satria Muda BritAma	
2014–15	Satria Muda BritAma	62-54	Pelita Jaya Jakarta	

Italic indicates the club withdrew or no longer plays.

=== 2016–present: Back to IBL ===
Year	Champions	Finals Result	Runners-up	Finals MVP
2016	CLS Knights Surabaya	2-1 (best-of-3)	Pelita Jaya Energi Mega Persada	Jamarr Johnson
2017	Pelita Jaya Energi Mega Persada	2-1 (best-of-3)	Satria Muda Pertamina Jakarta	Martavious Irving
2018	Satria Muda Pertamina Jakarta	2-1 (best-of-3)	Pelita Jaya Energi Mega Persada	Jamarr Johnson
2019	Stapac Jakarta	2-0 (best-of-3)	Satria Muda Pertamina Jakarta	Savon Goodman
2020	No Champion			
2021	Satria Muda Pertamina Jakarta	2-1 (best-of-3)	Pelita Jaya Bakrie Jakarta	Hardianus Lakudu
2022	Satria Muda Pertamina Jakarta	2-0 (best-of-3)	Pelita Jaya Bakrie Jakarta	Brachon Griffin
2023	Prawira Harum Bandung	2-0 (best-of-3)	Pelita Jaya Bakrie Jakarta	Muhammad Reza Guntara
2024	Pelita Jaya Bakrie Jakarta	2-1 (best-of-3)	Satria Muda Pertamina	Anthony Beane
2025	Dewa United Banten	2-1 (best-of-3)	Pelita Jaya Bakrie Jakarta	Joshua Ibarra
2026	Bogor Hornbills	3-2 (best-of-5)	Pelita Jaya Bakrie Jakarta	Travin Thibodeaux

Italic indicates the club withdrew or no longer plays.
