= Bima Perkasa Jogja =

Bima Perkasa Yogyakarta
- 2024 IBL Indonesia
- Leagues: Indonesian Basketball League since 1991/92 (as Bima Sakti Malang)
- Founded: 1988
- Dissolved: 2025
- History: List: Bima Sakti Malang (1988-1994) Bima Sakti Nikko Steel Malang (1995-2005, 2010-2016) Avian Bima Sakti Malang (2006) Bima Perkasa Jogja (2016-present) Bank BPD DIY Bima Perkasa Jogja (2017-2019) KAI Bima Perkasa Jogja (2019-2020) DNA Bima Perkasa Jogja (2020-2021) Bima Perkasa Jogja (2022-2024)
- Arena: Among Rogo Sports Hall
- Capacity: 5,000
- Location: Malang, East Java (1988-2016); Yogyakarta, Special Region of Yogyakarta (since 2016)
- Team colors: black, gold, maroon, white
- President: RM Gusthilantika Marrel Suryokusumo
- Head coach: Predrag Lukic
- Championships: 0
Home	Away	Third

Bima Perkasa Jogja is a former professional basketball club based in Yogyakarta, Indonesia. Originally, it was founded at 6 June 1988 in Malang, East Java under the name Bima Sakti Malang, and began their debut in the Perbasi's highest division since 1991/1992. Their highest achievement is advanced the 1995 and 1996 semifinals and get the third place.

In 1995, Bima Sakti basketball club were sponsored by PT Nikko Steel and changed its name to Bima Sakti Nikko Steel Malang till 2016. The club then went under due to financial problems after the 2016 IBL season. In its place, Bima Perkasa Jogja were founded in 2017 and has since been competing in the IBL until 2025.

== Former roster (2024-25) ==
Bima Perkasa Jogja roster
Players
Coaches

Pos.	No.	Nat.	Name	Ht.	Wt.
F	1	(Indonesia)	Yeremia Yeremia	1.88 m (6 ft 2 in)	81 kg (179 lb)
F	2	(United States)	Corey Anthony Raley-Ross	1.89 m (6 ft 2 in)	88 kg (194 lb)
G	4	(Indonesia)	Paul Charles Antonio Tuhumuri (R)	1.83 m (6 ft 0 in)	73 kg (161 lb)
F/C	5	(United States)	Kierell Ardarius Green	1.97 m (6 ft 6 in)	90 kg (198 lb)
G	9	(Indonesia)	Handri Satrya Santosa	1.82 m (6 ft 0 in)	76 kg (168 lb)
G	11	(Indonesia)	Joseph Paian De Smet	1.76 m (5 ft 9 in)	70 kg (154 lb)
F	12	(Indonesia)	Ali Mustofa	1.87 m (6 ft 2 in)	70 kg (154 lb)
G	13	(Indonesia)	Andre Rizqiano	1.83 m (6 ft 0 in)	84 kg (185 lb)
G	16	(Indonesia)	Avin Kurniawan	1.78 m (5 ft 10 in)	76 kg (168 lb)
F	19	(Indonesia)	Habib Ahmeda Annur	1.89 m (6 ft 2 in)	83 kg (183 lb)
G	21	(United States)	Keljin Blevins	1.98 m (6 ft 6 in)	91 kg (201 lb)
C	24	(Indonesia)	Moh Saroni	1.99 m (6 ft 6 in)	100 kg (220 lb)
F	29	(Indonesia)	Restu Dwi Purnomo (C)	1.92 m (6 ft 4 in)	90 kg (198 lb)
G	30	(Indonesia)	Muhammad Habibie Isminanda (R)	1.79 m (5 ft 10 in)	70 kg (154 lb)
F/C	34	(Indonesia)	Alfin Nur Indratama (R)	1.88 m (6 ft 2 in)	88 kg (194 lb)

Head coach

- (Indonesia) Oleh Halim

Assistant coach(es)

- (Indonesia) Yanuar Dwi Priasmoro

Legend

- (C) Team captain
- (HP) Heritage player
- (R) Rookie
- Injured

- Roster
Updated: 3 May 2025,

== Notable players ==
- (Indonesia) I Made Sudiadnyana
- (Indonesia) Barra Sugianto
- (Indonesia) Isman Thoyib
- (The Bahamas) Gjio Bain
- (Indonesia) Yanuar Dwi Priasmoro
- (Indonesia) Fredi Aris
- (Indonesia) Dimas Dewanto
- (Indonesia) Bima Riski Ardiansyah
- (Indonesia) Argus Sanyudy
- (Indonesia) Azzaryan Praditya
- (United States) Brandis Raley-Ross
- (Uganda) Jonathan Komagum
