= 2012–13 NBL Indonesia season =

2012–13 Speedy NBL Indonesia
- League: NBL Indonesia
- Sport: Basketball
- Duration: November 24, 2012 – April 28, 2013
- TV partner(s): antv, Vision 1 Sports, Kompas TV (only All-Star Game), TVRI (only Final)

Regular season
- Regular season champions: Dell Aspac
- Season MVP: Pringgo Regowo (Dell Aspac)
- Top scorer: Bima Riski Ardiansyah

Championship Series
- Champions: Dell Aspac
- Runners-up: Pelita Jaya

NBL Indonesia seasons
- ← 2011-12 2013–14 →

The 2012-13 NBL Indonesia is the third season of NBL Indonesia, a nationwide basketball competition which previously known as Indonesian Basketball League.

== Participating teams ==
- Satya Wacana Angsapura
- Dell Aspac Jakarta
- Stadium Jakarta
- Bima Sakti Malang
- CLS Knights
- Garuda Kukar Bandung
- Muba Hang Tuah
- Pelita Jaya Energi-MP Jakarta
- SM BritAma
- Tonga BSC
- NSH GMC Riau
- Pacific Caesar

== Competition format ==
Participating teams compete in the regular season using home tournament format. The regular season divided into 5 series, each with different host cities. The top teams in final overall standings will continue to the championship playoffs.

There is also a pre-season warm-up tournament held before the regular season.

Series	Venue	Schedule
Series 1	Bandung	24 Nov - 2 December 2012
Series 2	Jakarta	12–20 January 2013
Series 3	Malang	16–24 February 2013
Series 4	Solo	9–17 March 2013
Series 5	Denpasar	30–7 April 2013
Series 6	Surabaya	20–28 April 2013

== Regular season ==
=== Standings ===
Pos	Team	Pld	W	L	PF	PA	Pts
1	Aspac Jakarta	33	32	1	2463	1888	65
2	Pelita Jaya	33	29	4	2536	1860	62
3	Satria Muda	33	25	8	2304	1926	58
4	CLS Knights	33	25	8	2289	2006	58
5	Garuda Speedy Bandung	33	23	10	2163	1775	56
6	Stadium Jakarta	33	17	16	2129	2055	50
7	Muba Hangtuah	33	16	17	2182	2153	49
8	Bima Sakti	33	10	23	2071	2299	43
9	Satya Wacana	33	9	24	2085	2932	42
10	Pacific Caesar	33	7	26	1937	2484	40
11	NSH GMC Riau	33	3	30	1825	2498	36
12	Tonga BSC	33	2	31	1814	2459	35

Updated to games played on 13 February 2013.

== Statistics leaders ==
=== Individual statistic leaders ===
Category	Player	Team	Statistics/ Points
Points per game	Bima Rizky Ardiansyah	Bima Sakti	16.5
Rebounds per game	Galank Gunawan	Satria Muda BritAma	10.0
Assists per game	Kelly Purwanto	Pelita Jaya Energi-MP	5.1
Steals per game	Dimaz Muharri	CLS Knights	3.2
Blocks per game	R Ruslan	Stadium	2.5

== Awards ==
- Most Valuable Player: Pringgo Regowo, Dell Aspac
- Defensive Player of the Year: Galank Gunawan, Satria Muda BritAma
- Rookie of the Year: Andakara Prastawa, Dell Aspac
- Sixth Man of the Year: Andakara Prastawa, Dell Aspac
- Coach of the Year: Rastapani Horongbala, Dell Aspac
- Sportsmanship Award: Max Yanto, NSH GMC Riau

- All-NBL First Team:
  - F Pringgo Regowo, Dell Aspac
  - F Bima Riski Ardiansyah, Bima Sakti Nikko Steel
  - C Rony Gunawan, Satria Muda BritAma
  - G Andakara Prastawa, Dell Aspac
  - G Dimas Dewanto, Pelita Jaya

== Postseason ==
The championship series began on Saturday May 18, 2013, and concludes with the 2013 NBL Indonesia Finals, which began on May 26 between the Dell Aspac Jakarta and the Pelita Jaya Energi-MP Jakarta

=== Bracket ===
All matches were played in GOR UNY in Universitas Negeri Yogyakarta, Yogyakarta.

Quarterfinals/Preliminary
1	Dell Aspac	83
8	Bima Sakti	66
4	CLS Knights	57
5	Garuda Speedy	82
LQF1	Bima Sakti	70
LQF2	CLS Knights	91
2	Pelita Jaya	70
7	Muba Hangtuah	53
3	Satria Muda	82
6	Stadium Jakarta	60
LQF3	Muba Hangtuah	68
LQF4	Stadium Jakarta	78

Semifinals/Elimination
WQF2	Garuda Speedy	61
WQF3	Dell Aspac	46
WPE1	CLS Knights	78
LSF1	Dell Aspac	89
WQF4	Satria Muda	57
WQF3	Pelita Jaya	62
WPE2	Stadium Jakarta	68
LSF2	Satria Muda	57

Preliminary final
WE1	Dell Aspac	69	61
WSF1	Garuda Speedy	53	53
WSF2	Pelita Jaya	83	-
WE2	Stadium Jakarta	44	-

Final
WPF1	Dell Aspac	63
WPF2	Pelita Jaya	50

Except the Final, the team was eliminated after two losses.

=== Game Info ===
==== Quarterfinals ====
Saturday May 18, 2013
14:00 WIB

Game Info

Dell Aspac Jakarta 83, Bima Sakti Nikko Steel Malang 66
Scoring by quarter: 21-13, 21–20, 17–15, 24–18
Pts: Xaverius Prawiro (19); Rebs: Pringgo Regowo (12); Asts: Fandi Andika Ramadhani (5)	Pts: Bima Rizky Ardiansyah (23); Rebs: Bima Rizky Ardiansyah, Yanuar Dwi Priasmoro (9); Asts: Heryanto Gunawan (5)

GOR UNY Yogyakarta

Saturday May 18, 2013
16:00 WIB

Game Info

Satria Muda BritAma Jakarta 82, Stadium Jakarta 60
Scoring by quarter: 28-15, 13–12, 16–18, 25–15
Pts: Faisal Julius Achmad (25); Rebs: Frida Aris Susanto (14); Asts: Galank Gunawan (3)	Pts: Indra Budianto (14); Rebs: Oei Abraham Yoel Trisakti (7); Asts: Fanny Budianto (5)

GOR UNY Yogyakarta

Saturday May 18, 2013
18:00 WIB

Game Info

CLS Knights 57, Garuda Speedy Bandung 82
Scoring by quarter: 16-22, 15–20, 16–25, 10–15
Pts: Rachmad Febri Utomo (13); Rebs: Rachmad Febri Utomo (8); Asts: Rachmad Febri Utomo (3)	Pts: Christ Gideon (18); Rebs: Vinton Nolland Surawi, Johanes Hasoloan Pohan Siahaan (6); Asts: Wendha Wijaya (6)

GOR UNY Yogyakarta

Saturday May 18, 2013
20:00 WIB

Game Info

Pelita Jaya Energi-MP 70, Hangtuah Sumsel IM 53
Scoring by quarter: 17-14, 17–7, 16–15, 20–17
Pts: Dimas Aryo Dewanto (14); Rebs: Andy Poedjakesuma (9); Asts: Ary Chandra, Fidyan Dini, Robert Santo Yunarto (3)	Pts: Ahmad Junaidi (8); Rebs: Ahmad Junaidi (9); Asts: Hardianus (5)

GOR UNY Yogyakarta

==== Preliminary round ====
Sunday May 19, 2013
18:00 WIB

Game Info

Bima Sakti Nikko Steel Malang 70, CLS Knights 91
Scoring by quarter: 19-27, 15–19, 19–25, 17–20
Pts: Yanuar Dwi Priasmoro (24); Rebs: Bima Rizky Ardiansyah (11); Asts: Yanuar Dwi Priasmoro (7)	Pts: Sandy Febiansyakh (17); Rebs: Dian Heryadi (8); Asts: Dimaz Muharri (8)

GOR UNY Yogyakarta

Sunday May 19, 2013
20:00 WIB

Game Info

Hangtuah Sumsel IM 68, Stadium Jakarta 78
Scoring by quarter: 13-16, 19–21, 14–24, 22–17
Pts: Ahmad Junaidi (14); Rebs: Ahmad Junaidi, I.G.N Teguh Putra Negara (8); Asts: Hardianus (5)	Pts: Merio Ferdiansyah Sudrajat (21); Rebs: Mohammad Tri Wicaksono (9); Asts: Merio Ferdiansyah Sudrajat, Indra Budianto, Yan Steven Pattikawa (3)

GOR UNY Yogyakarta

==== Semifinals ====
Monday May 20, 2013
18:00 WIB

Game Info

Garuda Speedy Bandung 61, Dell Aspac Jakarta 46
Scoring by quarter: 11-9, 16–11, 11–19, 23–7
Pts: Wendha Wijaya (19); Rebs: Vinton Nolland Surawi (11); Asts: Vinton Nolland Surawi (4)	Pts: Pringgo Regowo (12); Rebs: Pringgo Regowo (12); Asts: Xaverius Prawiro, Fandi Andika Ramadhani (2)

GOR UNY Yogyakarta

Monday May 20, 2013
20:00 WIB

Game Info

Satria Muda BritAma Jakarta 57, Pelita Jaya Energi-MP 62
Scoring by quarter: 12-19, 15–16, 13–7, 17–20
Pts: Arki Dikania Wisnu (16); Rebs: Rony Gunawan (9); Asts: Rony Gunawan, Bayu Anggara (3)	Pts: Kelly Purwanto Ari Nugroho (21); Rebs: Kelly Purwanto Ari Nugroho, Andy Poedjakesuma (8); Asts: Kelly Purwanto Ari Nugroho (3)

GOR UNY Yogyakarta

==== Elimination round ====
Tuesday May 21, 2013
18:00 WIB

Game Info

Stadium Jakarta 68, Satria Muda BritAma Jakarta 57
Scoring by quarter: 19-15, 17–19, 13–10, 19–13
Pts: Merio Ferdiansyah Sudrajat (16); Rebs: Mohammad Tri Wicaksono (10); Asts: Mohammad Tri Wicaksono, Chandra Nurhadi Yusran (4)	Pts: Firdaus Julius Achmad (12); Rebs: Galank Gunawan (15); Asts: Rony Gunawan, Arki Dikania Wisnu (2)

GOR UNY Yogyakarta

Tuesday May 21, 2013
20:00 WIB

Game Info

CLS Knights 78, Dell Aspac Jakarta 89
Scoring by quarter: 20-26, 16–28, 20–20, 22–15
Pts: Wijaya Saputra (18); Rebs: Dian Heryadi (7); Asts: Dimaz Muharri (7)	Pts: Fandi Andika Ramadhani (20); Rebs: Pringgo Regowo (11); Asts: Andakara Prastawa Dhyaksa, Wahyu Widayat Jati (6)

GOR UNY Yogyakarta

==== Preliminary finals ====
Thursday May 23, 2013
18:00 WIB

Game Info

Dell Aspac Jakarta 69, Garuda Speedy Bandung 53
Scoring by quarter: 17-19, 14–12, 17–15, 21–7
Pts: Xaverius Prawiro (17); Rebs: Muhammad Isman Thoyib (9); Asts: Fandi Andika Ramadhani (5)	Pts: Diftha Pratama (12); Rebs: Vinton Nolland Surawi, Fendi Yudha Pratama (7); Asts: Wendha Wijaya (4)

GOR UNY Yogyakarta

Friday May 24, 2013
16:00 WIB

Game Info

Garuda Speedy Bandung 53, Dell Aspac Jakarta 61
Scoring by quarter: 6-14, 15–14, 24–9, 8–24
Pts: Diftha Pratama, Surliyadin (12); Rebs: Vinton Nolland Surawi (9); Asts: Wendha Wijaya (5)	Pts: Andakara Prastawa Dhyaksa (16); Rebs: Wahyu Widayat Jati (11); Asts: Andakara Prastawa Dhyaksa, Xaverius Prawiro, Fandi Andika Ramadhani, Wahyu Widayat Jati (2)

GOR UNY Yogyakarta

Thursday May 23, 2013
20:00 WIB

Game Info

Pelita Jaya Energi-MP 83, Stadium Jakarta 44
Scoring by quarter: 29-4, 17–15, 19–10, 18–15
Pts: Andy Poedjakesuma (17); Rebs: Ponsianus Nyoman Indrawan R (13); Asts: Kelly Purwanto Ari Nugroho, Robert Santo Yunarto (4)	Pts: Oei Abraham Yoel Trisakti (8); Rebs: Ruslan (8); Asts: Oei Abraham Yoel Trisakti (3)

GOR UNY Yogyakarta

==== Battle of Third ====
Sunday May 26, 2013
17:00 WIB

Game Info

Garuda Speedy Bandung 83, Stadium Jakarta 64
Scoring by quarter: 20-14, 22–18, 13–18, 28–14
Pts: Fadlan Minallah (18); Rebs: Vinton Nolland Surawi (12); Asts: Wendha Wijaya (9)	Pts: Yan Steven Pattikawa (21); Rebs: Ruslan (11); Asts: Mohammad Tri Wicaksono (4)

GOR UNY Yogyakarta

==== Final ====
TVRI

Sunday May 26, 2013
20:00 WIB

Game Info

Dell Aspac Jakarta 63, Pelita Jaya Energi-MP 50
Scoring by quarter: 11-12, 17–14, 18–12, 17–12
Pts: Andakara Prastawa Dhyaksa (17); Rebs: Muhammad Isman Thoyib (12); Asts: Fandi Andika Ramadhani (7)	Pts: Kelly Purwanto Ari Nugroho (15); Rebs: Dimas Aryo Dewanto, Andy Poedjakesuma (9); Asts: Andy Poedjakesuma (3)

GOR UNY Yogyakarta
