= Pelita Jaya Basketball Club =

Pelita Jaya
- 2026 IBL Indonesia
- League: Kobatama; 1989–2002; IBL/NBL; 2003–present
- Founded: 1988; 38 years ago
- History: List: Pelita Jaya (1988-1999) Citra Satria Pelita (CSP) (2000-2001) Kalila Jakarta (2002-2003) Mitra Kalila (2004-2005) Pelita Jaya Esia (2006-2012) Pelita Jaya Energi Mega Persada (2012-2017) Pelita Jaya Basketball (2017-present)
- Arena: GOR Soemantri Brodjonegoro
- Location: Jakarta, Indonesia
- Team colors: Orange, Blue, White
- President: Andiko Ardi Purnomo
- Team manager: Adhi Pratama
- Head coach: Johannis Winar
- Team captain: Andakara Prastawa
- Ownership: Syailendra Bakrie, Anindhita Bakrie
- Championships: Kobatama: 2 (1990, 1991–92); IBL: 2 (2017, 2024); IBL All Indonesian: 2 (2023, 2024)
- Website: pelitajayabasketball.co.id
Home	Away	Third

Pelita Jaya Jakarta Basketball Club (colloquially known as PJ) is an Indonesian professional basketball club owned by Bakrie Group. Competing in the Perbasi's highest division since 1989, Pelita Jaya was IBL and Kobatama champions four times throughout they're history, in 1990, 1991–1992, 2017, 2024. They also won All-Indonesian Cup three times, in 2016, 2023, and 2024.

== Club history ==
Pelita Jaya Basketball is a professional basketball club based in Jakarta. Born in October 1988 as the involvement of the Bakrie Business Group in its efforts to participate in fostering national sports achievements. Over time, this idea transformed into an obsession and commitment to continue developing Pelita Jaya Basketball as a realization of the contribution of the Bakrie family to the community (in the field of sports), to become the number one basketball club in Indonesia.

Pelita Jaya Basketball once acquired the semi-professional clubs, Citra Satria Jakarta for 2000 & 2001 season as Bali Jeff Citra Satria-Pelita and Dwidasa Mitra Guntur for 2004 & 2005 season as Mitra Kalila.

After running for more than 30 years, Pelita Jaya Basketball athletes have proven able to score achievements on a national and international scale. They also took part in raising the name of the nation in the arena of the SEA Games and the Asian Games.

Pelita Jaya Basketball, which is now under PT Pelita Jaya Bakrie, manages the provision of funds, infrastructure, educational scholarships, recruitment and coaching systems to achievements.

In December 2024, Pelita Jaya participated in exhibition games against four NBL1 South teams in Melbourne, Australia.

== Current roster ==
Note: Flags indicate national team eligibility at FIBA-sanctioned events. Players may hold other non-FIBA nationalities not displayed.

Pelita Jaya roster
Players
Coaches

Pos.	No.	Nat.	Name	Ht.	Wt.	DOB (YYYY-MM-DD)
G	0	(Indonesia)	Russel Nyoo (injured) (R)	1.81 m (5 ft 11 in)	83 kg (183 lb)	24 – 1 November 2001
G	1	(Indonesia)	Muhamad Arighi	1.82 m (6 ft 0 in)	80 kg (176 lb)	29 – 12 February 1997
PG	2	(Indonesia)	Jacob Lobbu	1.75 m (5 ft 9 in)	71 kg (157 lb)	25 – 31 May 2001
F	3	(Indonesia)	Brandon Jawato	1.93 m (6 ft 4 in)	98 kg (216 lb)	33 – 3 June 1993
G/F	5	(United States)	Perrin Buford (I)	1.97 m (6 ft 6 in)	100 kg (220 lb)	32 – 25 January 1994
G	7	(Indonesia)	Andakara Prastawa (C)	1.73 m (5 ft 8 in)	73 kg (161 lb)	34 – 16 August 1992
G	9	(Indonesia)	Agassi Goantara	1.87 m (6 ft 2 in)	84 kg (185 lb)	27 – 17 October 1999
F/C	10	(Indonesia)	Oka Ananta Yogiswara	1.92 m (6 ft 4 in)	89 kg (196 lb)	23 – 5 January 2003
F	11	(Indonesia)	Aldy Izzatur Rachman	1.92 m (6 ft 4 in)	79 kg (174 lb)	26 – 3 April 2000
SG	13	(Indonesia)	Andrew Lensun	1.91 m (6 ft 3 in)	85 kg (187 lb)	26 – 9 September 2000
C	15	(Indonesia)	Vincent Rivaldi Kosasih	2.03 m (6 ft 8 in)	96 kg (212 lb)	30 – 17 June 1996
G/F	21	(Indonesia)	Hendrick Xavi Yonga	1.83 m (6 ft 0 in)	75 kg (165 lb)	24 – 7 August 2002
F/C	22	(Indonesia)	Anto Febryanto Boyratan	1.96 m (6 ft 5 in)	90 kg (198 lb)	24 – 10 February 2002
F/C	24	(Indonesia)	Neo Putu Pande	1.96 m (6 ft 5 in)	90 kg (198 lb)	25 – 5 February 2001
F	33	(Indonesia)	Candra Irawan (R)	1.89 m (6 ft 2 in)	91 kg (201 lb)	24 – 3 August 2002
F	34	(United States)	Darious Moten (I)	2.03 m (6 ft 8 in)	88 kg (194 lb)	34 – 9 August 1992
C	55	(United States)	Jeff Withey (I)	2.18 m (7 ft 2 in)	104 kg (229 lb)	36 – 7 March 1990

Head coach

- (United States) David Singleton

Assistant coach(es)

- (Indonesia) Johannis Winar
- (Indonesia) Koko Heru Setyo Nugroho
- (Indonesia) Hermanto

Legend

- (C) Team captain
- (I) Import player
- (R) Rookie
- Injured

- Roster
Updated: 12 February 2026

=== Depth chart ===
Pos.	Starting 5	Bench
C	Jeff Withey	Vincent Kosasih
PF	Darious Moten	Neo Putu Pande
SF	Perrin Buford	Hendrick Xavi Yonga
SG	Agassi Goantara	Muhamad Arighi
PG	Andakara Prastawa	Jacob Lobbu

== Notable alumni ==
=== Players ===
- Set a club record or won an individual award as a professional player.
- Played at least one official international match for his senior national team at any time.

=== Foreign ===
- (Lebanon) (United States) Thomas Robinson
- (Philippines) (United States) Justin Brownlee
- (United States) JaQuori McLaughlin
- (Bahrain) (United States) C. J. Giles
- (United States) Dominique Sutton
- (United States) Malachi Richardson
- (United States) Jaleel Roberts
- (United States) James Dickey
- (United States) K. J. McDaniels
- (United States) Chris McCullough
- (United States) Amorie Archibald

=== Indonesian ===
- (Indonesia) Ali Budimansyah
- (Indonesia) Ary Chandra
- (Indonesia) Dimas Dewanto
- (Indonesia) Govinda Julian Saputra
- (Indonesia) Ponsianus Nyoman Indrawan
- (Indonesia) Andi Poedjakesuma
- (Indonesia) Adhi Pratama
- (Indonesia) Tri Hartanto
- (Indonesia) Erick Christopher Sebayang
- (Indonesia) Faisal Julius Achmad
- (Indonesia) Teddy Apriyana Romadonsyah
- (Indonesia) Ferdinand Damanik
- (Indonesia) Kelly Purwanto
- (Indonesia) Respati Ragil
- (Indonesia) Fictor Gideon Roring
- (Indonesia) Daniel Wenas

=== Coaches ===
- Set a club record or won an individual award as a professional coach.
- Functioned as head coach for any senior national team at least once at an official international match.

- (Indonesia) Johannis Winar
- (Australia) Rob Beveridge
- (Philippines) Nat Canson
