= Stapac Jakarta =

- 2018-19 IBL Indonesia
- Leagues: Kobatama; 1996–2002; IBL/NBL; 2003–2019
- Founded: 1986
- Dissolved: 2020
- History: Dell Aspac (2003-2010); M88 Aspac (2010-2016); W88 Aspac (2016-2017); Stapac (2017-2019)
- Location: Jakarta, Indonesia
- President: Irawan Haryono
- Championships: Kobatama: 8 (1988, 1989, 1992-93, 1995, 1996, 2000, 2001, 2002); IBL/NBL: 5 (2003, 2005, 2012-13, 2013-14, 2019)
- Website: Official website
Home

Stapac Jakarta is one of Indonesia's top basketball clubs. They have won 13 national championships, entering the finals of the top-tier domestic competition started from Kobatama and IBL, since its founding in 1986. Historically, the team has sent about half of its players to represent Indonesia in international basketball.

== History ==
Formerly known as XL ASPAC Texmaco Jakarta, the team renamed itself with the entry of a new main sponsor, the computer giant Dell. From 2003 to 2007, Aspac has appeared in the finals of the now-defunct Indonesian Basketball League, losing in 2004, 2006, and 2007 to Jakarta rivals Satria Muda. In 2005, Aspac became the first professional basketball team to finish undefeated (22–0) in a top-tier Indonesian league by beating Satria Muda, 2–0, in a best-of-three showdown. They also became the first team to win the Indonesian championship five times. They have defunct since 2020 because most of their players were called up to national team.

== NBL Era ==
Season	Pos Regular Season	Championship Series
2010/11	3	4th place
2011/12	2	2nd place
2012/13	1	Champion (1)
2013/14	2	Champion (2)
2014/15	2	5th place

== IBL Era ==
Seasons	Regular season	Play-off	Head Coach
2016	3	Semi-Finals	AF Rinaldo
2017	2 (White Group)	Semi-Finals	
2018	2 (White Group)	Semi-Finals	Bong Ramos
2019	1 (White Group)	Champion	Giedrius Zibernas

== Achievements ==
FIBA Asia Champions Cup

- Third place (1): 1997

== History ==
=== Mario, Andi, Thoyib, and Denny Era (1997–2009) ===
The rise of the Aspac basketball franchise in Indonesia began with a KOBATAMA championship victory in 2000, led by players Andi Poedjakesuma and Denny Sumargo. The addition of a young Indonesian player Mario Wuysang whose childhood was spent in the US and played for Indiana University – Purdue University Fort Wayne of the NCAA Division II. After his addition to the roster, Aspac brought in two IBL titles in 2003 and 2005. The team also added Isman Thoyib who stood at 2.01 meters tall, strengthen its frontcourt, establishing Aspac as a consistent title contender during this era.

=== Xaverius Era (2010–2015) ===
Xaverius Prawiro is an important icon of Aspac Jakarta. He led Aspac to two championships. His leadership proved vital in the championships. With his experience and strong mentality, he willed Aspac to victory in a lot of crucial games. However, he decided to retire at the age of 28 because he failed to bring Aspac a championship in 2015. Many questioned his decision to retire because he was still in his prime.

=== Naturalization Era (2013–2016) ===
Biboy or Ebrahim Enguio Lopez is the first naturalized player in Indonesia. Discovered by Aspac owners, Biboy is a Filipino player who was half-Indonesian from his Balinese father. Biboy took the league by storm debuting with 31 Point for Aspac and claiming the Rookie of the Year and Sixthman of the Year awards in 2014. With his help, Aspac again became champion in 2014. However, with the introduction of imports into the league, Biboy was eventually cut as he was also considered an import by the league.

=== The New Era of Aspac (since 2017) ===
A new era for Aspac was spearheaded by young players such as Abraham Damar Grahita, Andakara Prastawa, Kristian Liem, Widyanta Putra Teja and Vincent Kosasih which brought change to the Aspac team. Prastawa and Kristian Liem were the Rookie of the Year in their respective years. At 2,03 meters, Kristian proved very helpful in terms of rebounding. Joining them is Widhyanta Putra Tedja, who is regarded as the best point guard in the class of 2015. At the young age of 18, he managed to score 15 points in the Finals of Pre-Season IBL. Abraham, who joined in 2015, also made a big impact for the team with his sharpshooting and basketball IQ. Last is Vincent Kosasih who stands at 2,06 meters and played for the Indonesian national team in the 2017 SEA Games, winning the silver medal.

== Final roster ==
Aspac Jakarta roster
Players
Coaches

Pos.	No.	Nat.	Name	Ht.	Wt.
G	1	(United States)	Kendal Yancy	1.90 m (6 ft 3 in)	91 kg (201 lb)
F	3	(Indonesia)	Kaleb Gemilang	1.83 m (6 ft 0 in)	92 kg (203 lb)
F	4	(Indonesia)	Abraham Damar Grahita	1.80 m (5 ft 11 in)	75 kg (165 lb)
F	5	(United States)	Savon Goodman	1.98 m (6 ft 6 in)	100 kg (220 lb)
F	10	(Indonesia)	Rizky Effendi	1.86 m (6 ft 1 in)	90 kg (198 lb)
F	12	(Indonesia)	Fandi Ramadhani	1.85 m (6 ft 1 in)	85 kg (187 lb)
C	13	(Indonesia)	Ruslan Ruslan	1.97 m (6 ft 6 in)	72 kg (159 lb)
G	16	(Indonesia)	Oki Wira Sanjaya	1.90 m (6 ft 3 in)	82 kg (181 lb)
G	17	(Indonesia)	Mei Joni	1.88 m (6 ft 2 in)	80 kg (176 lb)
G/F	24	(Indonesia)	Agassi Goantara	1.85 m (6 ft 1 in)	84 kg (185 lb)
C	33	(Indonesia)	Vincent Kosasih	2.03 m (6 ft 8 in)	94 kg (207 lb)
C	34	(Indonesia)	Isman Thoyib	2.04 m (6 ft 8 in)	91 kg (201 lb)
G	71	(Indonesia)	Widyanta Putra Teja	1.81 m (5 ft 11 in)

Head coach

- (Lithuania) Giedrius Žibėnas

Assistant coach(es)

- (Indonesia)
- (Indonesia)

Legend

- (C) Team captain
- Injured

- Roster

== Stapac Legends ==
Legends
No	Name	Pos	National	Season	Champions
30	Xaverius Prawiro	SG	Indonesia	2004–2015	3 (2005,2013,2014)
6	Pringgo Regowo	PF	Indonesia	2008–2013, 2016–2017	2 (2013,2014)
34	Isman Thoyib	C	Indonesia	2003–2014, 2017–2018	4 (2003, 2005, 2013, 2014)
13	Ebrahim Enguio Lopez	SG	Indonesia Philippines	2013–2016	1 (2014)
10	Mario Wuysang	PG	Indonesia USA	2002–2009	3 (2002, 2003, 2005)
3	Mario Gerungan	PG	Indonesia	2006–2016	2 (2013,2014)
5	Andi Poedjakesuma	SG	Indonesia	1997–2009	5 (2000, 2001, 2002, 2003, 2005)
	Denny Sumargo	SG	Indonesia	2000–2008	5 (2000, 2001, 2002, 2003, 2005)
27	Antonius Joko Endratmo	PF	Indonesia	2003–2011	2 (2003, 2005)

== Individual awards ==
=== Most Valuable Player ===
- Denny Sumargo (2003, 2008)
- Pringgo Regowo (2013)
- Kaleb Ramot Gemilang (2019)

=== Rookie of the Year ===
- Denny Sumargo (2001)
- Mario Wuysang (2002)
- Andakara Prastawa (2013)
- Ebrahim Enguio Lopez (2014)
- Kristian Liem (2015)
- Agassi Goantara (2019)

=== Sixthman of the Year ===
- Andakara Prastawa (2013,2016,2018)
- Ebrahim Enguio Lopez (2014)
- Abraham Damar Grahita (2019)

=== Final MVP ===
- Fandi Andika Ramadhani (2013)
- Andakara Prastawa (2014)

=== All Defensive Team ===
- Denny Sumargo (2001–2006)

=== First Team NBL Indonesia ===
- Pringgo Regowo (2012, 2013)

== Notable former players ==
- Set a club record or won an individual award as a professional player.
- Played at least one official international match for his senior national team at any time.

- (Indonesia) Mei Joni
- (Indonesia) Antonius Ferry Rinaldo
- (United States) Bobby Parks
- (United States) Kenny Travis
- (Indonesia) Filiks Bendatu
- (United States) Dwayne McClain
- (Indonesia) Muhammad Rifky
- (Indonesia) Mintarya
- (Indonesia) Tri Adnyana Adiloka
- (Indonesia) Ali Budimansyah
- (Indonesia) Kaleb Gemilang
- (Indonesia) Vincent Kosasih
- (Indonesia) Abraham Damar Grahita
- (Indonesia) Agassi Goantara
- (Indonesia) Opung Radja
- (Indonesia) Riko Hantono
- (Indonesia) Alkristian Chandra
- (Indonesia) Cokorda Raka
- (Indonesia) Mario Gerungan
- (Indonesia) (Philippines) Ebrahim Enguio Lopez
- (Indonesia) Xaverius Prawiro
- (Indonesia) Denny Sumargo
- (Indonesia) Fictor Roring
- (Indonesia) Wahyu Widayat Jati
- (Indonesia) Mario Wuysang
- (Indonesia) Andi Poedjakesuma
- (Indonesia) Athmadi Dimas Mahendra
- (Indonesia) Suwandi Menara
- (Indonesia) Andakara Prastawa
- (Indonesia) Ferdinand Damanik
- (Indonesia) Isman Thoyib
- (Indonesia) Widyanta Putra Teja
- (Indonesia) Ujang Warlika

== Website ==
Official website
