= 2025 SEABA Under-16 Cup =

2025 SEABA U-16 Championship
6th FIBA Under-16 Asia Cup SEABA Qualifiers

Tournament details
- Host country: Philippines
- Dates: May 24–30
- Teams: 6
- Venue: 1 (in 1 host city)

Final positions
- Champions: Philippines (6th title)
- Runners-up: Indonesia
- Third place: Malaysia
- Fourth place: Thailand

Tournament statistics
- MVP: (Philippines) Carl de los Reyes

The 2025 SEABA Under-16 Championship was the Southeast Asia Basketball Association's qualifying tournament for the 2025 FIBA U16 Asia Cup. The tournament was held in San Fernando, Pampanga in the Philippines from May 24 to 30.

Batangas was initially named as the host, before it was moved to Pampanga.

Hosts Philippines won their sixth straight title defeating Indonesia in the gold medal match. Malaysia finished third, winning over Thailand in the bronze medal match. The three medalists will represent SEABA at the U16 Asian tournament to be held in July 2025 in Ulaanbaatar, Mongolia.

== Venue ==
San Fernando
Bren Z. Guiao Convention Center	2025 SEABA Under-16 Cup (Luzon)
Capacity: 3,000	2025 SEABA Under-16 Cup (Luzon)

== Results ==
=== Preliminary round ===
Pos	Team	Pld	W	L	PF	PA	PD	Pts	Qualification
1	Philippines (H)	5	5	0	474	270	+204	10	Final
2	Indonesia	5	4	1	347	282	+65	9	Final
3	Thailand	5	3	2	312	333	−21	8	Third place game
4	Malaysia	5	2	3	317	339	−22	7	Third place game
5	Vietnam	5	1	4	313	419	−106	6	Fifth place game
6	Singapore	5	0	5	305	425	−120	5	Fifth place game

Rules for classification: 1) Points; 2) Head-to-head results; 3) Points difference; 4) Points scored.
(H) Hosts

May 24
14:00

Summary

Indonesia	68–47	Singapore
Scoring by quarter: 15–4, 17–15, 13–17, 23–11
Pts: Sutanto 17; Rebs: Sebastian 9 Asts: Hernusi 7		Pts: Cheng 13; Rebs: Leow 8 Asts: Goh 3

Bren Z. Guiao Convention Center, San Fernando
Referees: Lin Yuan-Dian (TPE), Aaron Rey Cañete (PHI), Pham Trung Kien Le (VIE)

May 24
16:30

Summary

Thailand	56–47	Malaysia
Scoring by quarter: 13–7, 24–13, 6–17, 13–10
Pts: Allsopp 17; Rebs: Boonsrang 16; Asts: Wilairoj 6		Pts: Kingsley 8 Rebs: Lim 9 Asts: Kingsley 4

Bren Z. Guiao Convention Center, San Fernando
Referees: Lee Seung-mu (KOR), Swara Yoga Sangara (INA), Ong Jin Leong (SGP)

May 24
19:00

Summary

Vietnam	62–113	Philippines
Scoring by quarter: 20–29, 13–32, 17–22, 12–30
Pts: Nguyen H.M.K. 13; Rebs: Nguyen L. 9 Asts: Phan 7		Pts: Cariño, T. Pascual 16; Rebs: Cariño 12; Asts: de los Reyes 6

Bren Z. Guiao Convention Center, San Fernando
Referees: Yuen Chun Yip (HKG), Chitchanok Srisawat (THA), Hum Zhung Liang (MAS)

May 25
14:00

Summary

Malaysia	45–67	Indonesia
Scoring by quarter: 5–12, 17–19, 18–15, 5–21
Pts: Kingsley 15; Rebs: Kingsley 9 Asts: San 5		Pts: Hernusi 19; Rebs: Sebastian 16; Asts: Al Hadi 6

Bren Z. Guiao Convention Center, San Fernando
Referees: Lin Yuan-Dian (TPE), Aaron Rey Cañete (PHI), Pham Trung Kien Le (VIE)

May 25
16:30

Summary

Singapore	83–89	Vietnam
Scoring by quarter: 18–18, 16–29, 27–19, 22–23
Pts: Yang 20; Rebs: Shao 9 Asts: Ong 7		Pts: Nguyen H.M.K. 21; Rebs: Nguyen H.Q.B. 8 Asts: Phan 7

Bren Z. Guiao Convention Center, San Fernando
Referees: Yuen Chun Yip (HKG), John Lester Celeste (PHI), Swara Yoga Sangara (INA)

May 25
19:00

Summary

Philippines	87–42	Thailand
Scoring by quarter: 31–1, 16–19, 15–9, 25–13
Pts: de los Reyes 16; Rebs: Lumague 15; Asts: T. Pascual 7		Pts: Jaeger 8 Rebs: Ravazzini 12; Asts: Korkaewkulapat 4

Bren Z. Guiao Convention Center, San Fernando
Referees: Lee Seung-mu (KOR), Hum Zhung Liang (MAS), Ong Jin Leong (SGP)

May 26
14:00

Summary

Vietnam	65–86	Malaysia
Scoring by quarter: 15–22, 11–18, 19–26, 20–20
Pts: Vo 11; Rebs: Nguyen M. 6 Asts: Phan 8		Pts: Tan 20; Rebs: Au 9 Asts: San 11

Bren Z. Guiao Convention Center, San Fernando
Referees: Lee Seung-mu (KOR), Chitchanok Srisawat (THA), Aaron Rey Cañete (PHI)

May 26
16:30

Summary

Indonesia	70–62	Thailand
Scoring by quarter: 19–13, 15–8, 20–15, 16–26
Pts: Hernusi 24; Rebs: Sebastian 15; Asts: Hernusi, Naranatha 4		Pts: Pearach, Allsopp 15; Rebs: Boonsrang 20; Asts: Pearach, Chunkrathok 3

Bren Z. Guiao Convention Center, San Fernando
Referees: Yuen Chun Yip (HKG), John Lester Celeste (PHI), Hum Zhung Liang (MAS)

May 26
19:00

Summary

Singapore	37–101	Philippines
Scoring by quarter: 7–24, 14–30, 9–25, 7–22
Pts: Tan 12; Rebs: Leow 4 Asts: Ong, Z. Lim 2		Pts: Cruz 14; Rebs: de los Reyes 13; Asts: T. Pascual 7

Bren Z. Guiao Convention Center, San Fernando
Referees: Lin Yuan-Dian (TPE), Swara Yoga Sangara (INA), Pham Trung Kien Le (VIE)

May 28
14:00

Summary

Thailand	63–46	Vietnam
Scoring by quarter: 17–12, 17–9, 13–14, 16–11
Pts: Boonsrang 19; Rebs: Boonsrang 17; Asts: Pearach 5		Pts: Nguyen M. 13; Rebs: Nguyen L. 12; Asts: Phan 3

Bren Z. Guiao Convention Center, San Fernando
Referees: Lee Seung-mu (KOR), John Lester Celeste (PHI), Hum Zhung Liang (MAS)

May 28
16:30

Summary

Malaysia	78–55	Singapore
Scoring by quarter: 19–14, 18–8, 16–15, 25–18
Pts: Kingsley 15; Rebs: Au 12; Asts: Lim 5		Pts: Ong 9 Rebs: 3 players 5 Asts: Ong, Tan 4

Bren Z. Guiao Convention Center, San Fernando
Referees: Lin Yuan-Dian (TPE), Chitchanok Srisawat (THA), Aaron Rey Cañete (PHI)

May 28
19:00

Summary

Philippines	77–68	Indonesia
Scoring by quarter: 22–18, 10–10, 25–19, 20–21
Pts: Cariño 15; Rebs: de los Reyes 11; Asts: de los Reyes 5		Pts: Hernusi 23; Rebs: Sebastian 5 Asts: Hernusi, Sebastian 2

Bren Z. Guiao Convention Center, San Fernando
Referees: Yuen Chun Yip (HKG), Ong Jin Leong (SGP), Pham Trung Kien Le (VIE)

May 29
14:00

Summary

Singapore	83–89 (OT)	Thailand
Scoring by quarter: 14–23, 24–19, 12–22, 29–15, Overtime: 4–10
Pts: Ong 30; Rebs: Tan 11; Asts: Leow 3		Pts: Chunkrathok 20; Rebs: Chunkrathok 11; Asts: Wilairoj 10

Bren Z. Guiao Convention Center, San Fernando
Referees: Yuen Chun Yip (HKG), John Lester Celeste (PHI), Hum Zhung Liang (MAS)

May 29
16:30

Summary

Vietnam	51–74	Indonesia
Scoring by quarter: 13–26, 15–12, 6–20, 17–16
Pts: Nguyen H.M.K. 12; Rebs: Nguyen L. 12; Asts: Nguyen M., Phan 4		Pts: Sutanto 15; Rebs: Al Hadi 7 Asts: Christiano, Naranatha 2

Bren Z. Guiao Convention Center, San Fernando
Referees: Lin Yuan-Dian (TPE), Aaron Rey Cañete (PHI), Ong Jin Leong (SGP)

May 29
19:00

Summary

Malaysia	61–96	Philippines
Scoring by quarter: 12–28, 17–27, 17–20, 15–21
Pts: Tan 20; Rebs: Tan 7 Asts: Tan, Au 3		Pts: T. Pascual, Antolin 15; Rebs: Cariño 11; Asts: Tan-Chi 6

Bren Z. Guiao Convention Center, San Fernando
Referees: Lee Seung-mu (KOR), Chitchanok Srisawat (THA), Swara Yoga Sangara (INA)

=== Final round ===
==== Fifth place game ====
May 30
14:00

Summary

Vietnam	78–87	Singapore
Scoring by quarter: 16–15, 27–28, 18–13, 17–31
Pts: Nguyen M. 17; Rebs: Nguyen M. 6 Asts: Nguyen M., Phan 5		Pts: Ong 17; Rebs: Leow 13; Asts: Ong 8

Bren Z. Guiao Convention Center, San Fernando
Referees: Aaron Rey Cañete (PHI), John Lester Celeste (PHI), Swara Yoga Sangara (INA)

==== Third place game ====
May 30
16:30

Summary

Thailand	69–78	Malaysia
Scoring by quarter: 11–26, 16–22, 23–14, 19–16
Pts: David 19; Rebs: Boonsrang 17; Asts: Pearach 4		Pts: Sing, Tan 11; Rebs: Sham 10; Asts: Sham 7

Bren Z. Guiao Convention Center, San Fernando
Referees: Yuen Chun Yip (HKG), Lin Yuan-Dian (TPE), Pham Trung Kien Le (VIE)

==== Final ====
May 30
19:00

Summary

Philippines	70–40	Indonesia
Scoring by quarter: 21–5, 20–15, 18–7, 11–13
Pts: Hallare 13; Rebs: de los Reyes 13; Asts: de los Reyes, T. Pascual 4		Pts: Christiano 9 Rebs: Yabe 8 Asts: Hernusi 3

Bren Z. Guiao Convention Center, San Fernando
Referees: Lee Seung-mu (KOR), Hum Zhung Liang (MAS), Ong Jin Leong (SGP)

== Final standings ==
Qualified for the 2025 FIBA U16 Asia Cup

Rank	Team	Record
1st place, gold medalist(s)	Philippines	6–0
2nd place, silver medalist(s)	Indonesia	4–2
3rd place, bronze medalist(s)	Malaysia	3–3
4	Thailand	3–3
5	Singapore	1–5
6	Vietnam	1–5

== Awards ==
2025 SEABA Under-16 Cup champions

Philippines
6th title
