= Raven Gonzales =

Filipino basketball player

No. 9 – Abra Solid North Weavers
- Position: Center
- League: MPBL

Personal information
- Born: October 23, 2002 (age 24) Dagupan City, Pangasinan, Philippines
- Listed height: 6 ft 7 in (2.01 m)

Career information
- High school: De La Salle Zobel
- College: De La Salle
- Playing career: 2025–present

Career history
- 2025–present: Abra Solid North Weavers

Career highlights
- MPBL champion (2025); 2× MPBL All-Star (2025, 2026); MPBL Rookie of the Year (2025); UAAP champion (2023); 3× PBA D-League champion (2022 Aspirants' Cup, 2023 Aspirants' Cup, 2024 Aspirants' Cup)

Raven Angelo Gonzales (né Cortez; born October 23, 2002), formerly known as Raven Cortez, is a Filipino professional basketball player for the Abra Solid North Weavers of the Maharlika Pilipinas Basketball League (MPBL). He played for the De La Salle Zobel Junior Archers in high school and the DLSU Green Archers in college.

He has also played for the Philippines internationally, previously taking part in youth competitions.

== High school career ==
Gonzales began attending De La Salle Zobel when he was in Grade 7. He became known during his Grade 9 season with the De La Salle Zobel Junior Archers for his size and defensive skills. In a game against the UE Junior Warriors, he had 13 points, 14 rebounds and nine blocks. He was then selected for the NBTC All-Star Game, and also played in the SLAM Rising Stars Classic. He and Forthsky Padrigao then participated in the 2018 Basketball Without Borders Asia event.

However, a MCL injury he suffered during his time with the national team saw Gonzales play only three games in UAAP Season 81, eventually missing the rest of the season. He recovered in time to play in the 2019 SLAM Rising Stars Classic. That would be his last official game for more than a year, as the injury was later revealed to be an ACL tear. He then underwent surgery, missing all of UAAP Season 82.

On October 6, 2020, with a year of eligibility remaining with DLSZ, Gonzales committed to the De La Salle Green Archers.

== College career ==
Although Gonzales was eligible for UAAP Season 84, he did not make the final lineup and was named as a COVID replacement. He made his official De La Salle debut during Season 85. In a win over the Ateneo Blue Eagles, their first win over them since 2017, he had an efficient eight points with two blocks. During the season, he suffered a sprained ankle, missing several games. Then, in one of his first games back, he had 13 points and four rebounds in a win over the UST Growling Tigers. They did not make the Final Four that year, losing to the Adamson Soaring Falcons in their last game of the season.

During the first round of Season 86, Gonzales was benched for two games, both losses. He was reinserted into the lineup against the UE Red Warriors, and then led DLSU in scoring with 18 points, five rebounds, and three blocks off the bench as they got the win. The win also gave De La Salle a 4–3 record at the end of the first round of eliminations. From there, in the second round, he stepped up in his production, as the team went on a seven-game winning streak to sweep the second round. In one of their wins, against the FEU Tamaraws, he led them in scoring again with 16 points. They were able to extend their winning streak up to nine games and into the finals before losing to the UP Fighting Maroons in Game 1. De La Salle then won the next two games to win its first UAAP championship since 2016.

In Season 87, De La Salle finished with the best record in the league at 12–2. They made it back to the finals for another rematch against UP. In Game 2, Gonzales contributed eight points, two rebounds, and two blocks in 10 minutes off the bench to force a deciding Game 3. In Game 3, UP won, denying De La Salle of back-to-back titles.

== Professional career ==
=== Abra Solid North Weavers (2025–present) ===
On March 1, 2025, Gonzales announced that he would turning pro after he signed with the Abra Weavers of the regional Maharlika Pilipinas Basketball League, forgoing his two remaining years of eligibility with De La Salle. In his debut with the Weavers, he had 12 points, five rebounds, and two assists in a win over the Biñan Tatak Gel. After a loss to the Pasay Voyagers, he bounched back with 14 rebounds in a win over the Bulacan Kuyas. From there, the Weavers won 36 straight games, including the playoffs, and won the MPBL title. For the season, Gonzales won Rookie of the Year and was selected as an All-Star.

== Personal life ==
Raven's younger sister Riane Gonzales plays for the De La Salle Lady Spikers volleyball team. Their mother is Rona Gonzales. In September 2024, both Raven and Riane decided to go by the surname Gonzales from that point onward in honor of Rona.

== National team career ==
In 2017, Gonzales was part of the Batang Gilas lineup for the 2017 SEABA U-16 Championship. He joined one of Gilas' tallest frontcourts in years alongside Kai Sotto, Geo Chiu, Bismarck Lina, and Josh Lazaro. They were able to sweep the tournament and win the gold medal. In 2018, he was named to the Gilas Cadets' lineup for the 2018 FIBA U16 Asian Championship. As a backup to Sotto, he had 12 points and 12 rebounds in a win over Malaysia as the duo also combined for five blocks. He also played in the FIBA U-17 World Cup that year, averaging 7.0 points, 4.7 boards, and a steal and a block. During the Philippines' bronze medal game against China in the 2018 FIBA U18 Asian Championship, he injured his right knee. He finished the tournament with averages of 3.2 points and 6.5 rebounds.

In 2021, Gonzales was called up to practice with the senior Gilas Pilipinas team, but had to beg off due to academics.
