= SEABA Under-16 Cup =

Basketball tournament

- Most recent season or competition: 2025 SEABA Under-16 Cup
- Founded: 2011
- Country: SEABA member nations
- Continent: FIBA Asia (Asia)
- Most recent champion: Philippines (6th title)
- Most titles: Philippines (6 titles)

The SEABA Under-16 Cup is an under-16 basketball championship in the International Basketball Federation's Southeast Asia Basketball Association, one of FIBA Asia's subzone. The event started in 2011 and is held bi-annually. The winners compete in the FIBA Asia Under-16 Championship, which started in 2009.

== Summary ==
Year	Host	Final			Third-place game		
Year	Host	Champion	Score	Second Place	Third Place	Score	Fourth Place
2011; Details	(Malaysia); Banting	Philippines	No playoffs	Malaysia	Indonesia	No playoffs	Singapore
2013; Details	(Indonesia); Yogyakarta	Philippines	No playoffs	Thailand	Malaysia	No playoffs	Indonesia
2015; Details	(Philippines); Cagayan de Oro	Philippines	No playoffs	Malaysia	Indonesia	No playoffs	Thailand
2017; Details	(Philippines); Quezon City	Philippines	No playoffs	Malaysia	Thailand	No playoffs	Indonesia
2023; Details	(Indonesia); Surabaya	Philippines	No playoffs	Malaysia	Indonesia	No playoffs	Thailand
2025; Details	(Philippines); San Fernando	Philippines	70–40	Indonesia	Malaysia	78–69	Thailand

== Medal table ==
Rank	Nation	Gold	Silver	Bronze	Total
1	Philippines	6	0	0	6
2	Malaysia	0	4	2	6
3	Indonesia	0	1	3	4
4	Thailand	0	1	1	2
Totals (4 entries)		6	6	6	18

== Participating nations ==
Legend

- 1st — Champion
- 2nd — Runner-up
- 3rd — Third place
- • — Participated, non-podium finish or will participate for the upcoming tournament
- × — Did not enter; withdrew; banned

For each tournament, the number of teams in each of the finals tournament are shown.

Teams	2011 (5 teams)	2013 (5 teams)	2015 (5 teams)	2017 (5 teams)	2023 (4 teams)	2025 (6 teams)	Years
Brunei	×	×	5th	×	×	×	1
Cambodia	×	×	×	×	×	×	0
Indonesia	3rd	4th	3rd	4th	3rd	2nd	6
Laos	5th	×	×	×	×	×	1
Malaysia	2nd	3rd	2nd	2nd	2nd	3rd	6
Myanmar	×	×	×	×	×	×	0
Philippines	1st	1st	1st	1st	1st	1st	6
Singapore	4th	5th	×	5th	×	5th	4
Thailand	×	2nd	4th	3rd	4th	4th	5
Vietnam	×	×	×	×	×	6th	1
