= 2013 SEABA Under-16 Championship =

2013 SEABA U-16 Championship
2nd Southeast Asian Basketball Championship
- Official Logo

Tournament details
- Host country: Indonesia
- Dates: July 14–18
- Teams: 5
- Venue(s): 1 (in 1 host city)

Final positions
- Champions: Philippines (2nd title)
- Runners-up: Thailand
- Third place: Malaysia
- Fourth place: Indonesia

Tournament statistics
- MVP: (Philippines) Jolo Mendoza
- Top scorer: (Malaysia) Yee T.H. (16.5)
- Top rebounds: (Philippines) M. Nieto (10.0)
- Top assists: (Indonesia) Darmawan (5.8)
- PPG (Team): Philippines (82.3)
- RPG (Team): Philippines (46.8)
- APG (Team): Philippines (14.8)

The 2013 SEABA Under-16 Championship was the qualifying tournament for Southeast Asia Basketball Association at the 2013 FIBA Asia Under-16 Championship. The tournament was held in Yogyakarta, Indonesia from July 14 to July 18.

== Round robin ==
Qualified for the 2013 FIBA Asia Under-16 Championship

Team	Pld	W	L	PF	PA	PD	Pts
Philippines	4	4	0	329	172	+157	8
Thailand	4	3	1	248	232	+16	7
Malaysia	4	2	2	298	249	+49	6
Indonesia	4	1	3	229	279	-50	5
Singapore	4	0	4	181	302	-121	4

July 14
17:00

Match Results - THA/MAS

Thailand	66–58	Malaysia
Scoring by quarter: 19–16, 15–11, 10–10, 22–21
Pts: Kupadit 18; Rebs: Jamkrajang 13; Asts: Kupadit, Krutyai 4		Pts: Tan W.J. 12; Rebs: Foo T.J. 10; Asts: Foo T.J. 3

GOR Among Rogo, Yogyakarta
Referees: Budi Marfan (INA), Leong Chuen Wing (SIN), Haryanto Sutaryo (INA)

July 14
20:00

Match Results - SIN/INA

Singapore	47–70	Indonesia
Scoring by quarter: 10–16, 18–15, 8–19, 11–20
Pts: Tze C.T. 12; Rebs: Tze C.T. 11; Asts: Ong 3		Pts: Astaghfirul 14; Rebs: Astaghfirul 6 Asts: Darmawan 12

GOR Among Rogo, Yogyakarta
Referees: Yong Wai Chong (MAS), Samphan Kamphusiriphan (THA), Dominique Pomar (PHI)

July 15
18:30

Match Results - MAS/SIN

Malaysia	90–57	Singapore
Scoring by quarter: 19–13, 25–8, 25–17, 21–19
Pts: Yee T.H. 19; Rebs: Lau 8 Asts: Foo T.J. 4		Pts: Tze C.T. 10; Rebs: Lim 6 Asts: Lim, Lee 3

GOR Among Rogo, Yogyakarta
Referees: Samphan Kamphusiriphan (THA), Dominique Pomar (PHI), Budi Marfan (INA)

July 15
20:30

Match Results - INA/PHI

Indonesia	52–87	Philippines
Scoring by quarter: 13–24, 10–27, 18–14, 11–22
Pts: Reynaldi 15; Rebs: Astaghfirul 14; Asts: Darmawan 5		Pts: dela Cruz 17; Rebs: Nieto 15; Asts: Navarro 3

GOR Among Rogo, Yogyakarta
Referees: Leong Chuen Wing (SIN), Yen Sin Tee (SIN), Wu Xin (SIN)

July 16
18:30

Match Results - SIN/THA

Singapore	33–57	Thailand
Scoring by quarter: 14–10, 10–12, 3–13, 6–22
Pts: Tang, Ong 7 Rebs: Tze C.T. 10; Asts: Lim 2		Pts: Jamkrajang 11; Rebs: Jamkrajang 11; Asts: Boonkong 5

GOR Among Rogo, Yogyakarta

July 16
20:30

Match Results - PHI/MAS

Philippines	76–72	Malaysia
Scoring by quarter: 20–15, 22–17, 20–24, 14–16
Pts: Mendoza 19; Rebs: Nieto 12; Asts: Navarro 3		Pts: Tan W.J. 23; Rebs: Lau 13; Asts: Koon W.C. 4

GOR Among Rogo, Yogyakarta

July 17
17:00

Match Results - PHI/THA

Thailand	58–82	Philippines
Scoring by quarter: 7–21, 21–20, 16–24, 14–17
Pts: Kupadit 15; Rebs: Jamkrajang 8 Asts: Krutyai, Leelaphiphatkul, Nantho 2		Pts: Escoto 16; Rebs: Nieto 8 Asts: Navarro 5

GOR Among Rogo, Yogyakarta

July 17
20:30

Match Results - MAS/INA

Malaysia	78–50	Indonesia
Scoring by quarter: 15–9, 25–15, 20–12, 18–14
Pts: Yee T.H. 25; Rebs: Foo T.J. 13; Asts: Foo T.J. 6		Pts: Astaghfirul 18; Rebs: Reynaldi 8 Asts: Darmawan 4

GOR Among Rogo, Yogyakarta

July 18
18:30

Match Results - PHI/SIN

Philippines	84–44	Singapore
Scoring by quarter: 33–12, 15–7, 26–15, 10–10
Pts: Mendoza 17; Rebs: Paras 9 Asts: Decapia 5		Pts: Tze C.T. 11; Rebs: Goh 6 Asts: Ng, Lee 2

GOR Among Rogo, Yogyakarta

July 18
20:30

Match Results - INA/THA

Indonesia	59–67	Thailand
Scoring by quarter: 6–16, 16–15, 21–13, 16–23
Pts: Reynaldi 20; Rebs: Reynaldi 6 Asts: Darmawan 2		Pts: Nantho 23; Rebs: Makmeesiri, Jamkrajang 6 Asts: Kupadit 5

GOR Among Rogo, Yogyakarta

== Final standings ==
Rank	Team
Gold medal	Philippines
Silver medal	Thailand
Bronze medal	Malaysia
4	Indonesia
5	Singapore

== Awards ==
2013 SEABA Under-16 champions

Philippines
2nd title
