= Southeast Asia Basketball Association =

Subzone of FIBA Asia

Southeast Asia Basketball Association (SEABA)
- The SEABA logo

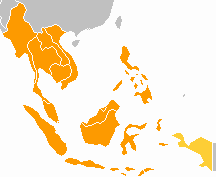
- Map of Southeast Asia showing SEABA's 10 national federations
- Abbreviation: SEABA
- Type: Basketball organisation
- Headquarters: Singapore
- Region served: Southeast Asia
- Members: 10 national associations
- President: (Vietnam) Henry B. Nguyen
- Parent organization: FIBA Asia

The Southeast Asia Basketball Association (SEABA) is a subzone of FIBA Asia consisting of countries from Southeast Asia. The ASEAN Basketball League (ABL), a professional league, is the top level of club competition run by the SEABA.

== Member associations ==
=== Current members ===
- Brunei
- Cambodia
- Indonesia
- Laos
- Malaysia
- Myanmar
- Philippines
- Singapore
- Thailand
- Vietnam

=== Former member ===
- Timor-Leste – moved to FIBA Oceania in August 2015

== National team tournaments ==
=== SEABA Championship ===
The SEABA Championship is a tournament between national teams. It was first held in Segamat in 1994, and every two years thereafter. The fourth edition, which was held in Manila in 2001, changed the year of the subzone qualifiers in odd-numbered years, beginning that same year; and directly it became the main qualifying tournament for the FIBA Asia Championship.

Year	Host	First place	Second place	Third place
1994	(Malaysia) Segamat	Malaysia	Thailand	Indonesia
1996	(Indonesia) Surabaya	Indonesia	Philippines	Unknown^{1}
1998	(Philippines) Manila	Philippines	Thailand	Malaysia
2001	(Philippines) Manila	Philippines	Thailand	Singapore
2003	(Malaysia) Kuala Lumpur	Philippines	Malaysia	Thailand
2005	(Malaysia) Kuala Lumpur	Malaysia	Indonesia	Thailand
2007	(Thailand) Ratchaburi	Philippines	Indonesia	Malaysia
2009	(Indonesia) Medan	Philippines	Indonesia	Malaysia
2011	(Indonesia) Jakarta	Philippines	Indonesia	Malaysia
2013	(Indonesia) Medan	Thailand	Malaysia	Singapore
2015	Singapore	Philippines	Malaysia	Singapore
2017	(Philippines) Quezon City	Philippines	Indonesia	Thailand

1. A 3rd Place Match took place between Malaysia and Thailand but the result is unknown.

=== SEABA Cup ===
The SEABA Cup is the qualifying tournament for the FIBA Asia Challenge, and is held in even-numbered years.

Year	Host	First place	Second place	Third place
2012	(Thailand) Chiang Mai	Philippines	Indonesia	Thailand
2014	(Indonesia) Batam	Singapore	Indonesia	Malaysia
2016	(Thailand) Bangkok	Philippines	Thailand	Singapore

=== SEABA Championship for Women ===
The SEABA Championship for Women is a tournament between national teams.

Year	Host	First place	Second place	Third place
1995	(Thailand) Surat Thani	Thailand	Philippines	Malaysia
1997	(Thailand) Bangkok	Thailand	Philippines	Malaysia
1999	(Malaysia) Genting	Malaysia	Thailand	Philippines
2002	(Thailand) Phuket	Thailand	Malaysia	Philippines
2004	Singapore	Singapore	Thailand	Malaysia
2007	(Thailand) Phuket	Thailand	Philippines	Malaysia
2010	(Philippines) Manila	Philippines	Thailand	Malaysia
2014	(Indonesia) Semarang	Malaysia	Indonesia	Singapore
2016	(Malaysia) Malacca City	Philippines	Malaysia	Singapore

=== SEABA Under-18 Championship ===
The SEABA Under-18 Championship is a tournament between national teams. The highest placers go to the FIBA Asia Under-18 Championship.

Year	Host	First place	Second place	Third place
1996	(Philippines) Santa Cruz	Philippines	Singapore	Malaysia
1998	(Thailand) Bangkok	Philippines	Malaysia	Thailand
2002	(Malaysia) Kuala Lumpur	Malaysia	Thailand	Indonesia
2004	(Philippines) Lucena	Philippines	Singapore	Thailand
2006	(Malaysia) Segamat	Malaysia	Singapore	Thailand
2008	(Malaysia) Kuala Lumpur	Philippines	Malaysia	Thailand
2010	(Myanmar) Yangon	Philippines	Malaysia	Thailand
2012	Singapore	Philippines	Indonesia	Singapore
2014	(Malaysia) Tawau	Philippines	Malaysia	Indonesia
2016	(Indonesia) Medan	Philippines	Thailand	Indonesia
2024	(Malaysia) Kuala Lumpur	Philippines	Indonesia	Malaysia
2026	(Thailand) Krabi	Philippines	Thailand	Malaysia

=== SEABA Under-16 Championship ===
The SEABA Under-16 Championship is a tournament between national teams. The highest placers go to the FIBA Asia Under-16 Championship.

Year	Host	First place	Second place	Third place
2011	(Malaysia) Banting	Philippines	Malaysia	Indonesia
2013	(Indonesia) Yogyakarta	Philippines	Thailand	Malaysia
2015	(Philippines) Cagayan de Oro	Philippines	Malaysia	Indonesia
2017	(Philippines) Quezon City	Philippines	Malaysia	Thailand
2023	(Indonesia) Surabaya	Philippines	Malaysia	Indonesia
2025	(Philippines) San Fernando	Philippines	Indonesia	Malaysia

=== SEABA Under-18 Championship for Women ===
The SEABA Under-18 Championship for Women is a tournament between national teams. The highest placers go to the FIBA Asia Under-18 Championship for Women.

Year	Host	First place	Second place	Third place
2014	(Indonesia) Semarang	Malaysia	Singapore	Indonesia
2024	(Thailand) Ratchaburi	Philippines	Thailand	Indonesia
2026	(Philippines) Bacolod	Philippines	Indonesia	Singapore

=== SEABA Under-16 Championship for Women ===
The SEABA Under-16 Championship for Women is a tournament between national teams. The highest placers go to the FIBA Asia Under-16 Championship for Women.

Year	Host	First place	Second place	Third place
2025	(Vietnam) Hanoi	Indonesia	Singapore	Malaysia

=== SEABA Under-17 3x3 Championship ===
The SEABA Under-17 3x3 Championship is a tournament between national teams.

=== Boys ===
Year	Host	First place	Second place	Third place
2025	Singapore	Vietnam	Thailand	Malaysia
2026	(Indonesia) Batam	Indonesia	Malaysia	Singapore

=== Girls ===
Year	Host	First place	Second place	Third place
2025	Singapore	Indonesia	Thailand	Singapore
2026	(Indonesia) Batam	Indonesia	Thailand	Vietnam

== Professional club tournaments ==
The ASEAN Basketball League is a tournament among professional club teams. The winner goes to the FIBA Asia Champions Cup. Formerly, from 2000 until 2008, SEABA held a club tournament known as SEABA Champions Cup.

=== SEABA Champions Cup ===
Year	Host	First place	Score	Second place	Third place
2000	Johor Bahru, Johor, Malaysia	(Philippines) Belle Corporation	69–64	(Indonesia) Mahaka Satria Muda	(Malaysia) Petronas Basketball Team
2002	Cebu City, Philippines	(Philippines) M. Lhuillier-Guardo	117–114 (OT)	(Philippines) Spring Cooking Oil	(Malaysia) Petronas Basketball Team
2007	Jakarta, Indonesia	(Philippines) Harbour Centre	85–67	(Indonesia) Satria Muda BritAma	(Malaysia) Petronas Basketball Team
2008	Jakarta, Indonesia	(Indonesia) Satria Muda BritAma	No playoffs	(Philippines) Harbour Centre	Malaysia National Basketball League Selection
2018	Nonthaburi, Thailand	(Thailand) Mono Vampire	No playoffs	(Indonesia) Pelita Jaya	(Malaysia) Red Baron

=== ASEAN Basketball League ===
Season	First place	Result	Second place	Third place
2009–10	(Philippines) Philippine Patriots^{1}	3–0	(Indonesia) Satria Muda BritAma	Singapore Slingers
2010–11	Chang Thailand Slammers^{1}	2–0	(Philippines) AirAsia Philippine Patriots	(Malaysia) Westports KL Dragons
2012	Indonesia Warriors	2–0	(Philippines) San Miguel Beermen^{1}	(Philippines) AirAsia Philippine Patriots
2013	(Philippines) San Miguel Beermen^{1}	3–0	Indonesia Warriors	Westports Malaysia Dragons
2014	(Thailand) Hi-Tech Bangkok City	2–0	Westports Malaysia Dragons^{1}	Singapore Slingers
2015–16	Westports Malaysia Dragons^{1}	3–2	Singapore Slingers	(Thailand) Hi-Tech Bangkok City
2016–17	(Hong Kong) Eastern^{1}	3–1	Singapore Slingers	(Philippines) Alab Pilipinas
2017–18	(Philippines) San Miguel Alab Pilipinas	3–2	(Thailand) Mono Vampire	(China) Chong Son Kung Fu^{1}
2018–19	CLS Knights Indonesia	3–2	Singapore Slingers	(Hong Kong) Eastern
2019–20	Canceled due to the COVID-19 pandemic in Southeast Asia.			
2020–21	Not held due to the COVID-19 pandemic in Southeast Asia.			
2021–22	Not held due to the COVID-19 pandemic in Southeast Asia.			
2023	Hong Kong Eastern	2–1	(Vietnam) Saigon Heat^{1}	(Malaysia) NS Matrix

1. Finished regular season with the best win–loss record.

== See also ==
- ABL 3x3 International Champions Cup
