= 2015 SEABA Under-16 Championship =

2015 SEABA U-16 Championship
3rd Southeast Asian Basketball Championship

Tournament details
- Host country: Philippines
- Dates: April 14–19
- Teams: 5 (from 11 federations)
- Venue: 1 (in 1 host city)

Final positions
- Champions: Philippines (3rd title)
- Runners-up: Malaysia
- Third place: Indonesia
- Fourth place: Thailand

Tournament statistics
- MVP: (Philippines) Sam Josef Belangel
- Top scorer: (Malaysia) Lim (17.3)
- Top rebounds: (Philippines) Gómez de Liaño (9.5)
- Top assists: (Philippines) Belangel (7.3)
- PPG (Team): Philippines (107.3)
- RPG (Team): Philippines (64.5)
- APG (Team): Philippines (22.0)

The 2015 SEABA Under-16 Championship was the qualifying tournament for Southeast Asia Basketball Association at the 2015 FIBA Asia Under-16 Championship. The tournament was held in Cagayan de Oro, Philippines from April 14 to April 19.

Xavier University was the venue for the games participated by the national teams of Brunei, Indonesia, Malaysia, Thailand, and the host country. The top three teams, excluding Indonesia, will represent SEABA at the 2015 FIBA Asia Under-16 Championship to be held in Semarang, Indonesia. The tournament followed a single round robin format.

The Philippines won their third straight title after winning all of their games in the tournament. Malaysia placed second, and Thailand, despite placing fourth, qualified to represent SEABA by virtue of Indonesia's host status of the Asian tournament.

== Venue ==
Cagayan de Oro
Xavier University Gymnasium
Capacity: 3,500
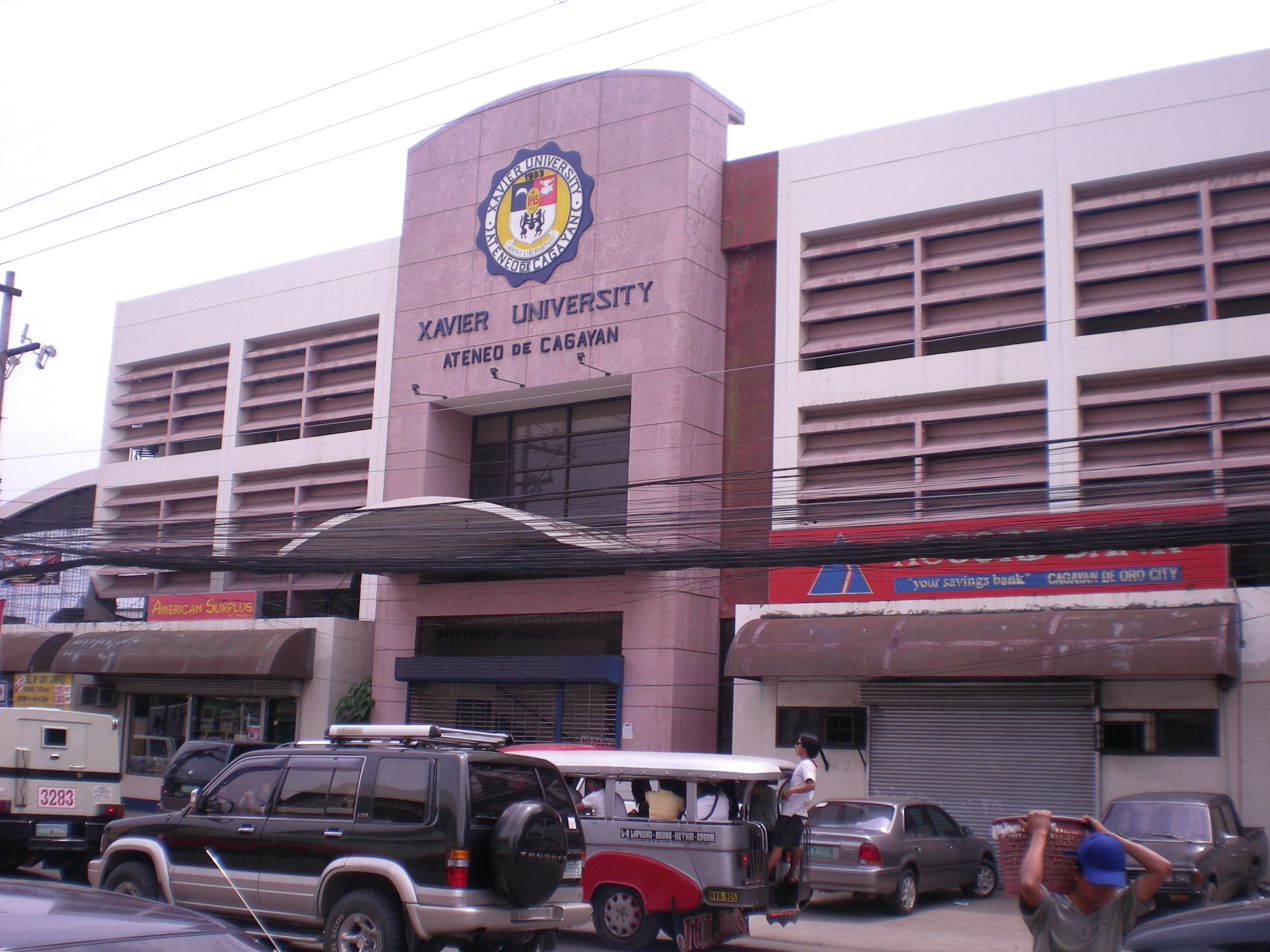

== Results ==
Pos	Team	Pld	W	L	PF	PA	PD	Pts	Qualification
1	Philippines (H)	4	4	0	429	198	+231	8	Qualified to 2015 FIBA Asia Under-16 Championship
2	Malaysia	4	3	1	345	302	+43	7	Qualified to 2015 FIBA Asia Under-16 Championship
3	Indonesia	4	2	2	361	262	+99	6	Qualified as hosts of the 2015 FIBA Asia Under-16 Championship
4	Thailand	4	1	3	285	281	+4	5	Qualified to 2015 FIBA Asia Under-16 Championship
5	Brunei	4	0	4	126	403	−277	4	

Source: SEABA
(H) Hosts

April 14
16:00

Boxscore

Indonesia	166–14	Brunei
Scoring by quarter: 46–3, 39–1, 45–3, 36–7
Pts: Liwa 23; Rebs: Liwa 9 Asts: Fernanda 6		Pts: Lai 6 Rebs: Lim 8 Asts: Ang, Chew 1

Xavier University Gymnasium, Cagayan de Oro

April 14
18:00

Boxscore

Thailand	66–80	Malaysia
Scoring by quarter: 20–22, 20–14, 14–17, 12–27
Pts: Thitikhunrat 18; Rebs: Thitikhunrat 15; Asts: Thitikhunrat 4		Pts: Thea 15; Rebs: Chang 11; Asts: Lim 7

Xavier University Gymnasium, Cagayan de Oro

April 15
16:00

Boxscore

Brunei	25–118	Thailand
Scoring by quarter: 3–29, 10–29, 8–35, 4–24
Pts: Soh 9 Rebs: Soh 8 Asts: Ang 2		Pts: Jamgrajang 18; Rebs: Intaranam 9 Asts: Thipthaweetha 6

Xavier University Gymnasium, Cagayan de Oro

April 15
18:00

Boxscore

Malaysia	69–106	Philippines
Scoring by quarter: 22–30, 14–26, 8–26, 25–24
Pts: Lim 26; Rebs: Lim, Kua 7 Asts: Low 4		Pts: Tibayan 22; Rebs: Tibayan 11; Asts: Belangel 10

Xavier University Gymnasium, Cagayan de Oro

April 17
16:00

Boxscore

Indonesia	74–89	Malaysia
Scoring by quarter: 13–16, 18–26, 10–20, 33–27
Pts: Maulana 18; Rebs: Maulana 7 Asts: Goantara, Rizqiano 4		Pts: Lim, Lee 13; Rebs: Thea 11; Asts: Lim 4

Xavier University Gymnasium, Cagayan de Oro

April 17
18:00

Boxscore

Philippines	105–48	Thailand
Scoring by quarter: 24–18, 25–11, 26–12, 30–7
Pts: Belangel 16; Rebs: Gómez de Liaño 9 Asts: Belangel 8		Pts: Saengsri 8 Rebs: Jamgrajang, Intaranam 6 Asts: Sapsudawong 2

Xavier University Gymnasium, Cagayan de Oro

April 18
14:00

Boxscore

Thailand	53–71	Indonesia
Scoring by quarter: 12–16, 10–10, 17–18, 14–27
Pts: Intaranam 12; Rebs: Sonsem 11; Asts: Thipthaweetha 4		Pts: Goantara 20; Rebs: Goantara 13; Asts: Goantara 4

Xavier University Gymnasium, Cagayan de Oro

April 18
16:00

Boxscore

Brunei	31–113	Philippines
Scoring by quarter: 3–42, 10–27, 4–20, 14–24
Pts: Lai 13; Rebs: Lim 8 Asts: Ang 1		Pts: Berjay 17; Rebs: Berjay, Gómez de Liaño 14; Asts: Escalona 4

Xavier University Gymnasium, Cagayan de Oro

April 19
14:00

Boxscore

Malaysia	107–56	Brunei
Scoring by quarter: 18–2, 28–32, 32–13, 29–9
Pts: Kua 24; Rebs: Kua 16; Asts: Inpik 5		Pts: Soh 16; Rebs: Lim 9 Asts: 5 players 1

Xavier University Gymnasium, Cagayan de Oro

April 19
16:00

Boxscore

Indonesia	50–106	Philippines
Scoring by quarter: 13–27, 11–32, 14–24, 12–23
Pts: Maulana 12; Rebs: Goantara 9 Asts: Rizqiano 3		Pts: Belangel 18; Rebs: Gozum 14; Asts: Belangel 8

Xavier University Gymnasium, Cagayan de Oro

== Final standings ==
Rank	Team
Gold medal	Philippines
Silver medal	Malaysia
Bronze medal	Indonesia
4	Thailand
5	Brunei

== Awards ==
2015 SEABA Under-16 champions

Philippines
3rd title

== Sponsorship ==
The tournament was sponsored by the MVP Sports Foundation, Smart Communications, Maynilad, Rio Verde Water Cagayan de Oro and Rough Rider Jeans Clothing with the Department of Tourism Promotions Board, led by Domingo Ramon Enerio III.
