= 2011 SEABA Under-16 Championship =

2011 SEABA U-16 Championship
1st Southeast Asian Basketball Championship

Tournament details
- Host country: Malaysia
- Dates: August 9 - August 13
- Teams: 5
- Venue(s): 1 (in 1 host city)

Final positions
- Champions: Philippines (1st title)
- Runners-up: Malaysia
- Third place: Indonesia
- Fourth place: Singapore

Tournament statistics
- Top scorer: (Malaysia) Chua J.S. (21.0)
- Top rebounds: (Laos) Bouphaheuanghak (10.5)
- Top assists: (Philippines) Tongco (3.0)
- PPG (Team): Philippines (92.8)
- RPG (Team): Philippines (48.8)
- APG (Team): Philippines (9.5)

The 2011 SEABA Under-16 Championship is the qualifying tournament for Southeast Asia Basketball Association at the 2011 FIBA Asia Under-16 Championship. The tournament was held on Banting, Kuala Langat, Malaysia from August 9 to August 13. The Philippines swept all of their assignments en route to their maiden championship title and qualified for the 2011 FIBA Asia Under-16 Championship together with 2nd placer Malaysia and 3rd placer Indonesia.

== Round robin ==
Qualified for the 2011 FIBA Asia Under-16 Championship

Team	Pld	W	L	PF	PA	PD
Philippines	4	4	0	371	219	152
Malaysia	4	3	1	300	280	20
Indonesia	4	2	2	293	306	-13
Singapore	4	1	3	228	241	-13
Laos	4	0	4	233	375	-142

August 9
19:00

Report

Indonesia	101–68	Singapore
Scoring by quarter: 22–17, 28–14, 24–13, 27–24
Pts: Abraham 28; Rebs: Istiadi, Kosasih 11; Asts: Kosasih 2		Pts: Goh K.C.D. 16; Rebs: Goh K.C.D. 8 Asts: Tee C.S., Ng N.H.E. 3

Kuala Langat Basketball Stadium, Banting
Referees: Tan Chin Siong (SIN), Ricor Buaron (PHI), Yong Wai Chong (MAS)

August 9
21:30

Report

Malaysia	64–91	Philippines
Scoring by quarter: 9–23, 17–21, 23–23, 15–24
Pts: Tan Z.H. 13; Rebs: Tan Z.H. 5 Asts: 0		Pts: Tolentino 16; Rebs: Tolentino 7 Asts: Diputado, Tongco 2

Kuala Langat Basketball Stadium, Banting
Referees: Fong Kin Long (HKG), Haryanto Sutaryo (INA), Meo Kok Eng (SIN)

August 10
19:00

Report

Singapore	108–70	Laos
Scoring by quarter: 32–17, 19–14, 27–20, 30–19
Pts: Goh K.C.D. 28; Rebs: Goh K.C.D. 13; Asts: 4 players 3		Pts: Thavonphaneuk 33; Rebs: Buophaheuanghak 11; Asts: Inthavixay, Buophaheuanghak 3

Kuala Langat Basketball Stadium, Banting
Referees: Haryanto Sutaryo (INA), Tee Yen Sin (MAS), Ricor Buaron (PHI)

August 10
21:00

Report

Philippines	109–46	Indonesia
Scoring by quarter: 22–3, 23–18, 30–11, 34–14
Pts: Diputado 20; Rebs: Pascual 12; Asts: Cani, Tongco 4		Pts: Purwoko, Abraham 9 Rebs: Kokodiputra 6 Asts: Abraham 1

Kuala Langat Basketball Stadium, Banting
Referees: Fong Kin Long (HKG), Yong Wai Chong (MAS), Meo Kok Eng (SIN)

August 11
19:00

Report

Indonesia	83–50	Laos
Scoring by quarter: 11–10, 29–17, 18–11, 25–12
Pts: Kosasih 23; Rebs: Kosasih 22; Asts: Fahdan, Kokodiputra 1		Pts: Thavonphaneuk 15; Rebs: Sengsouliya 12; Asts: Inthavixay 2

Kuala Langat Basketball Stadium, Banting
Referees: Tee Yen Sin (MAS), Meo Kok Eng (SIN), Tan Chin Siong (MAS)

August 11
21:00

Report

Malaysia	74–70	Singapore
Scoring by quarter: 18–12, 16–23, 21–16, 19–19
Pts: Chua J.S. 25; Rebs: Tong J.X. 13; Asts: Chua J.S. 2		Pts: Han X.Y. 21; Rebs: Goh K.C.D. 10; Asts: Han X.Y. 1

Kuala Langat Basketball Stadium, Banting
Referees: Fong Kin Long (HKG), Ricor Buaron (PHI), Haryanto Sutaryo (INA)

August 12
14:00

Report

Laos	57–101	Philippines
Scoring by quarter: 17–24, 15–24, 14–19, 11–34
Pts: Sengsouliya 17; Rebs: Buophaheuanghak 11; Asts: Inthavixay, Buophaheuanghak 3		Pts: Tolentino 30; Rebs: Tolentino 18; Asts: Tongco 4

Kuala Langat Basketball Stadium, Banting
Referees: Haryanto Sutaryo (INA), Tan Chin Siong (MAS), Tee Yen Sin (MAS)

August 12
16:00

Report

Indonesia	63–79	Malaysia
Scoring by quarter: 15–17, 22–25, 18–17, 10–20
Pts: Kokodiputra 20; Rebs: Kokodiputro 13; Asts: Yogia 1		Pts: Chua J.S. 30; Rebs: Tong J.X. 11; Asts: Chua J.S. 1

Kuala Langat Basketball Stadium, Banting
Referees: Fong Kin Long (HKG), Ricor Buaron (PHI), Meo Kok Eng (SIN)

August 13
19:00

Report

Philippines	70–52	Singapore
Scoring by quarter: 17–6, 17–12, 16–23, 20–11
Pts: Vito, Tolentino 13; Rebs: Javelosa 8 Asts: Tongco 2		Pts: Lim M.J.L. 11; Rebs: Goh K.C.D. 10; Asts: 0

Kuala Langat Basketball Stadium, Banting
Referees: Fong Kin Long (HKG), Tan Chin Siong (MAS), Haryanto Sutaryo (INA)

August 13
21:00

Report

Malaysia	83–56	Laos
Scoring by quarter: 24–11, 18–8, 22–23, 19–14
Pts: Chua J.S. 22; Rebs: Tan H.K. 14; Asts: Chua J.S. 2		Pts: Inthavixay, Phommasone 14; Rebs: Buophaheuanghak 11; Asts: Thavonphaneuk 1

Kuala Langat Basketball Stadium, Banting
Referees: Ricor Buaron (PHI), Meo Kok Eng (SIN), Tee Yen Sin (MAS)

== Final standings ==
Rank	Team
Gold medal	Philippines
Silver medal	Malaysia
Bronze medal	Indonesia
4	Singapore
5	Laos

== Awards ==
2011 SEABA Under-16 champions

Philippines
First title
