= 2023 SEABA Under-16 Championship =

2023 SEABA U-16 Championship
5th FIBA Under-16 Asia Championship SEABA Qualifiers

Tournament details
- Host country: Indonesia
- Dates: 17–19 July
- Teams: 4
- Venue(s): 1 (in 1 host city)

Final positions
- Champions: Philippines (5th title)
- Runners-up: Malaysia
- Third place: Indonesia
- Fourth place: Thailand

The 2023 SEABA Under-16 Championship was the qualifying tournament for Southeast Asia Basketball Association at the 2023 FIBA Under-16 Asian Championship. The tournament was held in Surabaya, Indonesia from July 17 to 19. GOR Kertajaya Surabaya served as the venue of the four-team competition.

The Philippines won their fifth straight title, their first since the 2017 edition, after completing a three-game sweep in the tournament. Malaysia, hosts Indonesia and Thailand finished the tournament with identical 1-2 records, however, due to superior quotient, Malaysia clinched second place, followed by Indonesia and Thailand.

Philippines and Malaysia will represent SEABA in the U16 Asian tournament to be held in September 2023 in Doha, Qatar.

== Results ==
| Pos | Team | Pld | W | L | PF | PA | PD | Pts | Qualification |
|---|---|---|---|---|---|---|---|---|---|
| 1 | Philippines | 3 | 3 | 0 | 256 | 166 | +90 | 6 | 2023 FIBA U16 Asian Championship |
| 2 | Malaysia | 3 | 1 | 2 | 217 | 256 | −39 | 4 (Note: Malaysia 3 Pts, +3 PD; Indonesia 3 Pts, +1 PD; Thailand 3 Pts, −4 PD) | 2023 FIBA U16 Asian Championship |
| 3 | Indonesia (H) | 3 | 1 | 2 | 210 | 221 | −11 | 4 | |
| 4 | Thailand | 3 | 1 | 2 | 192 | 232 | −40 | 4 | |

Rules for classification: 1) Points; 2) Head-to-head results; 3) Points difference; 4) Points scored.
(H) Hosts
Notes:

17 July 2023
17:00

Boxscore

| Philippines | 94–52 | Malaysia |
Scoring by quarter: 23–10, 23–2, 25–25, 23–15
| Pts: Alas 27; Rebs: Chua 8 Asts: Williams 5 | | Pts: Chia 12; Rebs: Chia 7 Asts: Hoo 5 |

GOR Kertajaya Surabaya, Surabaya
Referees: Rendra Lesmana (INA), Neo Kai Chong (SGP), Danusorn Laosaksam (THA)

17 July 2023
19:00

Boxscore

| Indonesia | 62–64 | Thailand |
Scoring by quarter: 16–16, 14–16, 17–15, 15–17
| Pts: Putra 19; Rebs: Putra 17; Asts: Setiawan 3 | | Pts: Barwisch 13; Rebs: Pisarnyuttanapong 12; Asts: Pichaipaiboon 5 |

GOR Kertajaya Surabaya, Surabaya
Referees: Chan Owe Shiong (MAS), Trieu Chi Thanh (VIE), Harry Santos (PHI)

18 July 2023
17:00

Boxscore

| Thailand | 49–85 | Philippines |
Scoring by quarter: 13–21, 11–18, 12–21, 13–25
| Pts: Barwisch 17; Rebs: Ciati 10; Asts: Hines 4 | | Pts: Alas 18; Rebs: Daja 12; Asts: Alas, Gomez 5 |

GOR Kertajaya Surabaya, Surabaya
Referees: Chan Owe Shiong (MAS), Neo Kai Chong (SGP), Swara Yoga Sangara (INA)

18 July 2023
19:00

Boxscore

| Malaysia | 80–83 | Indonesia |
Scoring by quarter: 30–21, 14–25, 13–24, 23–13
| Pts: Tan J.W. 20; Rebs: Chia 11; Asts: Khoo 5 | | Pts: Putra 27; Rebs: Leonardy 11; Asts: Boentara, Setiawan 8 |

GOR Kertajaya Surabaya, Surabaya
Referees: Trieu Chi Thanh (VIE), Harry Santos (PHI), Danusorn Laosaksam (THA)

19 July 2023
17:00

Boxscore

| Thailand | 79–85 | Malaysia |
Scoring by quarter: 23–22, 18–25, 27–15, 11–23
| Pts: Barwisch 23; Rebs: Barwisch 8 Asts: Juergensen 6 | | Pts: Hoo 32; Rebs: Chia 8 Asts: Tan J.H. 5 |

GOR Kertajaya Surabaya, Surabaya
Referees: Rendra Lesmana (INA), Trieu Chi Thanh (VIE), Harry Santos (PHI)

19 July 2023
19:00

Boxscore

| Philippines | 77–65 | Indonesia |
Scoring by quarter: 16–21, 22–11, 27–19, 12–14
| Pts: Alas 19; Rebs: Daja 14; Asts: Williams 6 | | Pts: Putra 19; Rebs: Christiano 8 Asts: Christiano, Setiawan 4 |

GOR Kertajaya Surabaya, Surabaya
Referees: Neo Kai Chong (SGP), Chan Owe Shiong (MAS), Danusorn Laosaksam (THA)

== Awards ==
2023 SEABA Under-16 champions

Philippines
5th title
