= 2017 SEABA Under-16 Championship =

2017 SEABA U-16 Championship
4th Southeast Asian Basketball Championship

Tournament details
- Host country: Philippines
- Dates: May 14–18
- Teams: 5 (from 11 federations)
- Venue: 1 (in 1 host city)

Final positions
- Champions: Philippines (4th title)
- Runners-up: Malaysia
- Third place: Thailand
- Fourth place: Indonesia

Tournament statistics
- Top scorer: (Malaysia) Tang (16.5)
- Top rebounds: (Philippines) Sotto (8.5)
- Top assists: (Philippines) Guadaña
- PPG (Team): Philippines (100.0)
- RPG (Team): Philippines (62.8)
- APG (Team): Philippines (26.8)

The 2017 SEABA Under-16 Championship was the qualifying tournament for Southeast Asia Basketball Association at the 2017 FIBA Under-16 Asian Championship. The tournament was held in Quezon City, Philippines from May 14 to 18. The Smart Araneta Coliseum was the venue of the five-team competition, coinciding with the 2017 SEABA Championship.

The Philippines won their fourth straight title after winning all of their games in the tournament. Malaysia placed second while Thailand finished third. The top two teams represented SEABA to the Asian tournament held the following year.

== Venue ==
Quezon City
Smart Araneta Coliseum	2017 SEABA Under-16 Championship (Philippines)
Capacity: 25,000	2017 SEABA Under-16 Championship (Philippines)

== Results ==
Pos	Team	Pld	W	L	PF	PA	PD	Pts	Qualification
1	Philippines (C, H)	4	4	0	400	223	+177	8	Qualified to 2017 FIBA Under-16 Asian Championship
2	Malaysia (Q)	4	3	1	276	259	+17	7	Qualified to 2017 FIBA Under-16 Asian Championship
3	Thailand	4	2	2	262	314	−52	6	
4	Indonesia	4	1	3	275	305	−30	5	
5	Singapore	4	0	4	223	335	−112	4	

Source: Rappler
Rules for classification: (1) Tournament points, (2) Head-to-head tournament points, (3) Head-to-head goal average, (4) Overall goal average, (5) Drawing of lots
(C) Champions; (H) Hosts; (Q) Qualified for the phase indicated

May 14
10:00

Stats

Malaysia	63–58	Indonesia
Scoring by quarter: 21–15, 16–18, 18–16, 8–9
Pts: Tang 23; Rebs: Teoh 11; Asts: Teoh 8		Pts: Sebastian 12; Rebs: Robert 7 Asts: Robert 5

Smart Araneta Coliseum, Quezon City
Referees: Jeonard Garcia (PHI), Nattapong Jontapa (THA), Meo Kok Eng (SIN)

May 14
12:00

Stats

Singapore	42–108	Philippines
Scoring by quarter: 12–33, 14–23, 9–28, 7–24
Pts: Tor 10; Rebs: Bryan 9 Asts: Amado, Tor 3		Pts: K.Sotto 17; Rebs: Lina 10; Asts: Guadaña 6

Smart Araneta Coliseum, Quezon City
Referees: Chan Kin Pong (MAC), Rendra Lesmana (INA), Ting Pick Kieng (MAS)

May 15
10:00

Stats

Thailand	62–74	Malaysia
Scoring by quarter: 21–17, 18–23, 9–9, 14–25
Pts: Boateng, Chayapiwat 12; Rebs: Chayapiwat, Wadman 6 Asts: Boateng 3		Pts: Wong 24; Rebs: Tan 12; Asts: Wong 6

Smart Araneta Coliseum, Quezon City
Referees: Yuen Chun Yip (HKG), Rendra Lesmana (INA), Michael Tolentino (PHI)

May 15
12:00

Stats

Philippines	96–73	Indonesia
Scoring by quarter: 33–17, 25–11, 19–23, 19–22
Pts: Guadaña 19; Rebs: Guadaña 10; Asts: Guadaña 11		Pts: Alexander 18; Rebs: Sebastian 5 Asts: Robert 4

Smart Araneta Coliseum, Quezon City
Referees: Chuang Chih-Chun (TPE), Nattapong Jontapa (THA), Meo Kok Eng (SIN)

May 16
10:00

Stats

Indonesia	69–79	Thailand
Scoring by quarter: 13–23, 20–21, 15–17, 21–18
Pts: Alexander 21; Rebs: Fawwaz 9 Asts: Alexander 6		Pts: Homthuanlom 21; Rebs: Wadman 13; Asts: Wadman, Boateng 5

Smart Araneta Coliseum, Quezon City
Referees: Yu Jung (TPE), Meo Kok Eng (SIN), Chu Wei Chuen (MAS)

May 16
12:00

Stats

Malaysia	77–56	Singapore
Scoring by quarter: 23–7, 20–19, 14–18, 20–12
Pts: Tang 19; Rebs: Teoh 7 Asts: Teoh 6		Pts: B. Teo 9 Rebs: Chin 7 Asts: Amado 5

Smart Araneta Coliseum, Quezon City
Referees: Ferdinand Pascual (PHI), Samphan Kamphusiriphan (THA), Linn Maung (MYA)

May 17
10:00

Stats

Indonesia	75–67	Singapore
Scoring by quarter: 20–9, 16–25, 23–12, 16–21
Pts: Sebastian 17; Rebs: Fawwaz, Linduaji 9 Asts: Fernanda 3		Pts: B. Teo 16; Rebs: Chin 12; Asts: Adam 4

Smart Araneta Coliseum, Quezon City
Referees: Ricor Buaron (PHI), Nattapong Jontapa (THA), Ting Pick Kieng (MAS)

May 17
12:00

Stats

Thailand	46–113	Philippines
Scoring by quarter: 13–32, 12–31, 15–22, 6–28
Pts: Kinnaret 11; Rebs: Buakaw 6 Asts: Wadman, Iabsap 2		Pts: Calimag, Go 20; Rebs: Go 13; Asts: Padrigao 8

Smart Araneta Coliseum, Quezon City
Referees: Chuang Chih-Chun (TPE), Leong Chuen Wing (SIN), Rendra Lesmana (INA)

May 18
10:00

Stats

Singapore	58–75	Thailand
Scoring by quarter: 1–31, 17–9, 11–17, 29–18
Pts: Chin 12; Rebs: Adam 9 Asts: Amado 3		Pts: Chayapiwat 18; Rebs: Chayapiwat 18; Asts: Boateng 5

Smart Araneta Coliseum, Quezon City
Referees: Arnolfo Bermeo (PHI), Chu Wei Chuen (MAS), Linn Maung (MYA)

May 18
12:00

Stats

Philippines	83–62	Malaysia
Scoring by quarter: 22–15, 21–21, 22–16, 18–10
Pts: three players 15 each Rebs: K.Sotto 12; Asts: Padrigao 6		Pts: Teoh 19; Rebs: Wong 6 Asts: Wen 4

Smart Araneta Coliseum, Quezon City
Referees: Yu Jung (TPE), Chan Kin Pong (MAC), Meo Kok Eng (SIN)

== Final standings ==
	Qualified for the 2017 FIBA Under-16 Asian Championship
Rank	Team
Gold medal	Philippines
Silver medal	Malaysia
Bronze medal	Thailand
4	Indonesia
5	Singapore
