= Kai Sotto =

Filipino basketball player (born 2002)

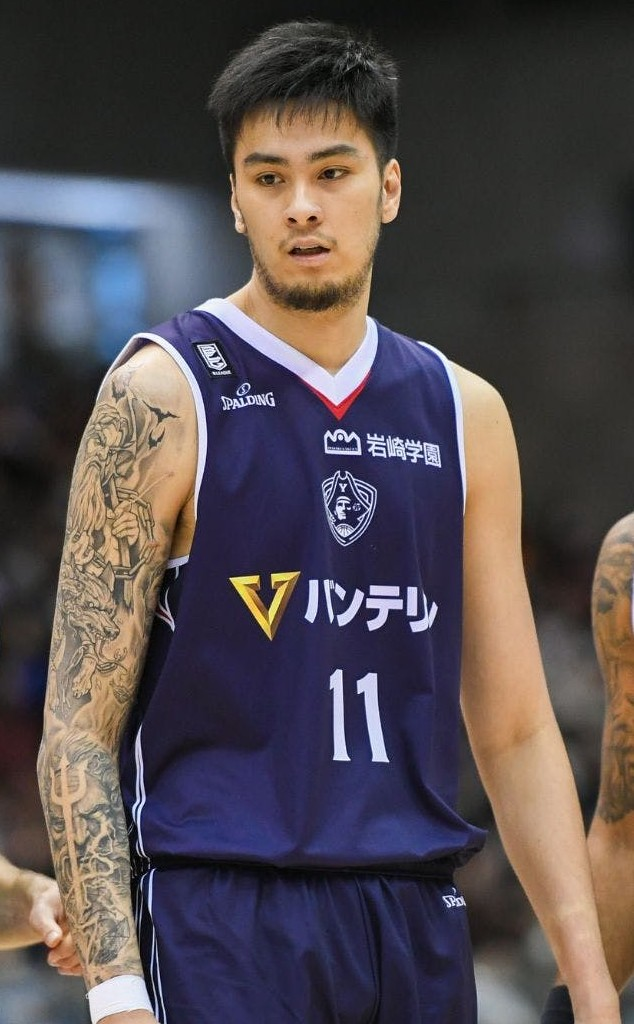
- Sotto with the Yokohama B-Corsairs in 2024

Altiri Chiba
- Position: Center
- League: B.League Premier

Personal information
- Born: May 11, 2002 (age 24) Las Piñas, Philippines
- Listed height: 7 ft 3 in (2.21 m)
- Listed weight: 232 lb (105 kg)

Career information
- High school: Ateneo (Quezon City)
- NBA draft: 2022: undrafted
- Playing career: 2021–present

Career history
- 2021–2023: Adelaide 36ers
- 2023–2024: Hiroshima Dragonflies
- 2023–2024: →Yokohama B-Corsairs
- 2024–2026: Koshigaya Alphas
- 2026–present: Altiri Chiba

Career highlights
- 2× NBL Fans MVP (2022, 2023)
Medals
Men's basketball
Representing the Philippines
SEABA U16 Championship
Gold medal – first place	2017 Quezon City	Team

Kai Zachary Perlado Sotto (English: /ˈkaɪ/, Tagalog: [ˈkaɪ ˈsɔtɔ]; born May 11, 2002) is a Filipino professional basketball player for Altiri Chiba of the Japanese B.League Premier. Listed at 7 ft 3 in (2.21 m), he plays the center position. He and Raul Dillo share the record for being the tallest Filipino professional basketball player. Sotto and Dillo are also the second-tallest Filipino men, with William Biscocho being the tallest at 7 ft 4 in.

Sotto is the son of former Philippine Basketball Association (PBA) player Ervin Sotto. He played high school basketball for the Ateneo Blue Eaglets of the University Athletic Association of the Philippines (UAAP), winning the juniors' division championship and MVP award. He then moved to the United States, where he was recruited by several NCAA Division I schools, but decided to forgo his college eligibility and signed with NBA G League Ignite in 2020. However, due to COVID-19-related travel restrictions and his decision to play for the Philippine national team at the 2021 FIBA Asia Cup qualifiers, Sotto left Ignite by mutual agreement. He then joined the Adelaide 36ers of Australia's National Basketball League (NBL) for the 2021–22 season, after which he declared for the 2022 NBA draft but went undrafted. He returned to the 36ers for another season before joining the Hiroshima Dragonflies of Japan's B.League. After a loan spell with the Yokohama B-Corsairs, he joined the Koshigaya Alphas in 2024.

Sotto has also represented the Philippines national team in several senior and youth tournaments. Among these are the Under-17 and Under-19 Basketball World Cups as well as the 2023 FIBA Basketball World Cup.

== Early life and education ==
Sotto was born on May 11, 2002, in Las Piñas, Philippines, to Ervin and Pamela Sotto (née Perlado). Sotto began playing basketball when he was four years old. Sotto began studying at Saint Francis of Assisi College to pursue his primary education. He grew up idolizing basketball players Tim Duncan, June Mar Fajardo and Kristaps Porziņģis.

In March 2019, Sotto left Ateneo as a third-year high school student to move to the United States in an attempt to advance his basketball career. In the United States, he continued his studies at the Miami School in Hamilton, Ohio while simultaneously dealing with commitments with The Skill Factory and NBA G League Ignite. He graduated from Miami School in April 2021.

== Amateur career ==
=== High school career ===
In April 2016, Sotto enrolled at Ateneo de Manila High School in Quezon City and joined its basketball program, the Ateneo Blue Eaglets, which competes in the Juniors' division of the University Athletic Association of the Philippines (UAAP). In UAAP Season 79 (2016–17), the 14-year-old 6 ft 9 in (2.06 m) Sotto led the league in blocked shots per game (1.5). He was named Rookie of the Year as Ateneo reached the Final Four. In his second season, UAAP Season 80 (2017–18), the 15-year-old 7 ft 1 in (2.16 m) Sotto led the Eaglets to the championship. In the three-game finals series, he averaged 17 points, 13 rebounds, and 6.3 blocks, winning him the Finals MVP award. He was also named in the season's Mythical Five and finished second in the MVP race. In his final season with Ateneo, UAAP Season 81 (2018–19), Sotto averaged 25.1 points, 13.9 rebounds, and 2.6 blocks per game. He won the season MVP award and was again named in the Mythical Team. However, Ateneo failed to defend their title, falling to the NSNU Bullpups in a rematch of the previous season's finals. Sotto never played at the collegiate level for Ateneo and went to the United States.

=== The Skill Factory ===
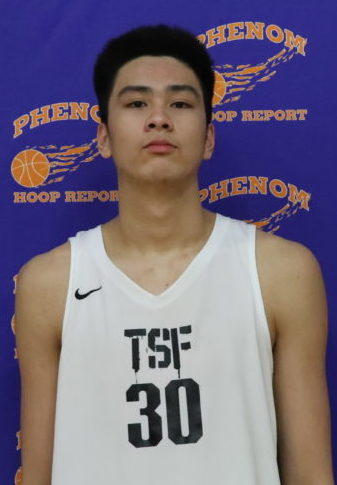
Sotto with The Skill Factory (2020)

On November 9, 2019, Sotto announced that he would join The Skill Factory, a preparatory program based in Atlanta, Georgia. In his debut one day later, he recorded 18 points and 12 rebounds in a 65–61 loss to IMG Academy. On January 21, 2020, Sotto was named MVP of the King Invitational tournament, averaging 27 points, 10.6 rebounds, 4.3 blocks and three assists in three games. On February 15, 2020, he participated in the Basketball Without Borders Global Camp held during NBA All-Star Weekend in Chicago.

=== U.S. college recruiting ===
In the United States, Sotto was considered a consensus four-star recruit by major recruiting services. He was recruited by several NCAA Division I programs. It was announced on May 13, 2020, that Sotto joined the NBA G League Ignite, forgoing his college eligibility.

College recruiting
Name	Hometown	School	Height	Weight	Commit date
Kai Sotto; C	Las Piñas, Philippines	Ateneo de Manila (Philippines)	7 ft 1 in (2.16 m)	215 lb (98 kg)	—
Kai Sotto; C	Recruit ratings: Rivals: 247Sports: ESPN: (84)				
Overall recruit ranking: Rivals: 70 247Sports: 54 ESPN: 65
Note: In many cases, Scout, Rivals, 247Sports, On3, and ESPN may conflict in their listings of height and weight.; In these cases, the average was taken. ESPN grades are on a 100-point scale.; Sources: "2020 Team Ranking". Rivals.

== Professional career ==
On May 13, 2020, Sotto signed with the NBA G League and joined the NBA G League Ignite as part of the league's new developmental program operating outside its traditional team structure. Ignite joined the 2020–21 season as part of the traditional team structure following the non-participation of several regular teams in a competition played inside a bio-secure bubble. However, Sotto was expected to miss several games with Ignite after he opted to play for the Philippine national team at the 2021 FIBA Asia Cup qualifiers given by logistical issues caused by COVID-19 pandemic-related travel restrictions. Despite being able to return to the United States, the NBA G League announced that it has reached a "mutual decision" that Sotto would not be able to rejoin Ignite.

Due to Sotto joining Ignite, he is ineligible to play for a college team in NCAA Division I games. Overtime reportedly expressed interest for Sotto to join their basketball league, Overtime Elite. He was also ineligible for the 2021 NBA draft, having recently graduated from high school in the same year and was only able to join in 2022 at the earliest.

=== Adelaide 36ers (2021–2023) ===
On April 21, 2021, Sotto signed a contract to play for the Adelaide 36ers of the Australian National Basketball League (NBL). He was signed as a "Special Restricted Player", which means he was treated the same as a local player and was not subject to the NBL's import limit. Sotto was guaranteed two years in his contract with an option to play for a third year.

Sotto made his professional debut on December 18, 2021, in a 93–67 road loss to the Cairns Taipans. Coming off the bench, he recorded one point, three rebounds, two assists, and two blocks in ten minutes. On April 11, 2022, in 17 minutes off the bench, he scored a team-high and then-career-high 21 points in their 93–85 home loss to the Brisbane Bullets. In his debut season, Sotto averaged 7.5 points and 4.5 rebounds in 15 minutes per game. In an online poll, he was voted the NBL Fans MVP.

On April 28, Sotto declared for the 2022 NBA draft. He worked out for several NBA teams but went undrafted. He then switched agents and on July 29, he announced that he would return to the 36ers for another season.

On October 28, 2022, Sotto recorded a season-high 16 points and seven rebounds in a 99–70 loss to the New Zealand Breakers. On January 8, 2023, he tied his season-high of 16 points and put up five rebounds and two blocks in an 85–83 loss to the Breakers. At the end of the 2022–23 season on February 5, he announced his departure from the Adelaide 36ers. In his final NBL season, Sotto won his back-to-back Fans MVP award.

=== B.League (2023–present) ===
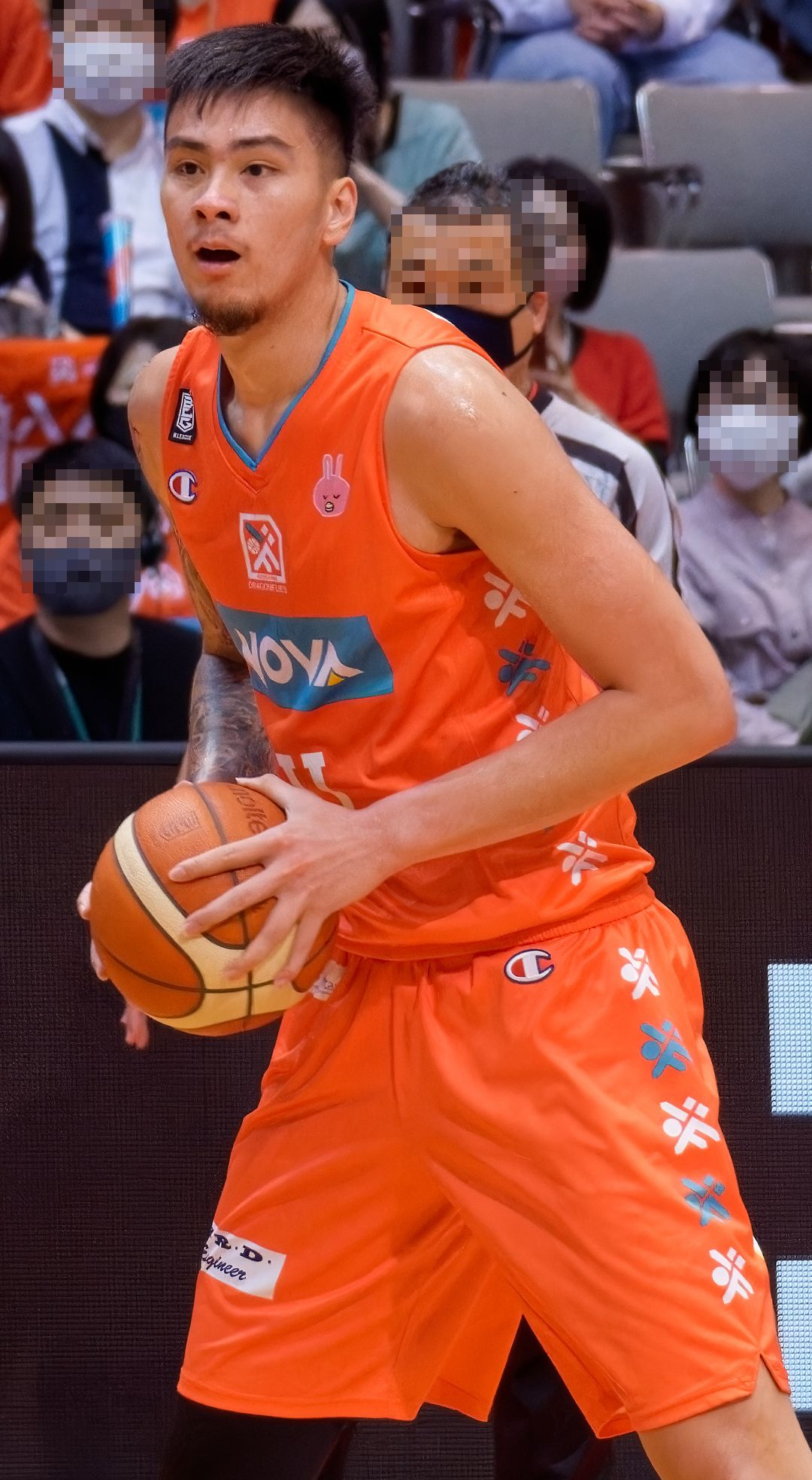
Sotto playing for the Hiroshima Dragonflies in 2023

On February 7, 2023, Sotto signed a contract with the Hiroshima Dragonflies of the Japanese B.League. He was contracted to play until the end of the 2022–23 season as he planned to join the 2023 NBA Summer League. On March 18, Sotto recorded his first B.League double-double with 21 points and 12 rebounds in a 90–72 win over the Ibaraki Robots. On May 24, Sotto signed a one-season contract extension with the Dragonflies. The contract included an opt-out clause if Sotto would be signed in the NBA.

On June 23, 2023, Sotto received an invite from the Orlando Magic to play in the NBA Summer League. He made his debut in the Magic's game against the Portland Trail Blazers, their fourth Summer League game for that season, putting up six points, four rebounds, and three blocks in 13 minutes played. However, in the Magic's final Summer League game against the Boston Celtics, he sustained a lumbar disc herniation after playing only eight minutes.

Despite playing in the 2023 FIBA Basketball World Cup, Sotto was ruled out by the Dragonflies due to his earlier back injury and consequent rehabilitation. On December 28, he was loaned to fellow B.League team Yokohama B-Corsairs for the rest of the 2023–24 season. On February 11, 2024, Sotto recorded a then career-high 26 points with 11 rebounds in a 90–85 win over the Chiba Jets. In February and March, he made eight consecutive double-digit scoring performances. On March 30, 2024, Sotto scored a career-high 28 points in their 81–75 loss to Alvark Tokyo. At the end of the season, his contract with Hiroshima and Yokohama had expired.

On June 21, 2024, Sotto was signed by the newly promoted Koshigaya Alphas. On October 12, he recorded his first double-double for the Alphas—18 points and a then career-high 15 rebounds in a 65–87 loss to the Ryukyu Golden Kings. On October 26, he played a career-high 40 minutes and set a then career-high 18 rebounds in a double-overtime loss to the Sendai 89ers (87–78). He suffered a sprained left ankle in Koshigaya's 80–67 win over Nagasaki Velca on November 6 which ended the Alphas' six-game losing streak. He returned for the next game on November 9, in which they defeated his former team, the Yokohama B-Corsairs 80–72. However, Sotto was put under concussion protocols after receiving an inadvertent blow to the head from Yokohama's Damien Inglis. On January 5, 2025, Sotto tore his left anterior cruciate ligament (ACL) in a 79–77 loss to the SeaHorses Mikawa. As a result, he was expected to be sidelined for at least six months.

After a year-long absence, Sotto returned on January 24, 2026, during the Alphas' 83–81 win over the Robots. However, logging only 10 minutes, he landed awkwardly after an attempted block and suffered a right ankle injury. On February 1 against Levanga Hokkaido, he reached the milestone of 1,000 career points in the B.League. Sotto then set a new career-high of 19 rebounds in their 96–93 double overtime loss to his former team Yokohama on March 29. Sotto entered the B-League's free agency on May 12, 2026.

After the expiry of his contract with the Koshigaya Alphas, Sotto is reportedly trying to return to the United States.

He attempted to play for the Texas A&M Aggies in the NCAA Division I. However, in September 2026, it was reportedly ruled that his college eligibility would not be stated since he has already played professional basketball in line with newly instated regulations.

On September 24, 2026, Sotto signed with Altiri Chiba following an injury from naturalized Japanese player Luke Evans.

== National team career ==
=== Junior national team ===
Sotto made his national team debut for the Philippines at the 2017 SEABA Under-16 Championship in Quezon City, Philippines. He averaged 16.8 points, 8.5 rebounds and three blocks per game, leading his team to a gold medal. Sotto registered 15 points, 12 rebounds and four blocks in an 83–62 win over Malaysia in the final. In April 2018, he represented the Philippines at the FIBA Under-16 Asian Championship in Foshan, China, where he led his team to fourth place. Sotto averaged 16.8 points, 13.5 rebounds, and 2.5 blocks per game and was named to the tournament's Mythical First Team. He recorded 28 points, 21 rebounds and three blocks in a quarterfinal win over Japan, before recording 26 points, 21 rebounds and six blocks in a semifinal loss to China. He led the event in rebounds and blocks per game, as well as player efficiency rating (21.5). Sotto played for the Philippines at the 2018 FIBA Under-17 World Cup in Argentina, where he averaged 16.4 points, 10.6 rebounds and 2.3 blocks per game. He led his team to 13th place, its best finish at the event. In a classification game win over Egypt, he had his best performance at the tournament, tallying 28 points, 17 rebounds and three blocks. Sotto represented the Philippines at the 2019 FIBA Under-19 World Cup in Heraklion, Greece, where his team finished in 14th place. He averaged 11.7 points and 7.9 rebounds, while tying with Ibou Badji for a tournament-high 3.1 blocks per game.

=== Senior national team ===
Sotto was supposed to make a debut with the senior national team at the 2021 FIBA Asia Cup qualifiers in early 2021 and went to the Philippines. However, due to logistical issues and abrupt hosting changes for the qualifiers caused by the COVID-19 pandemic, Sotto had to return the United States to rejoin Ignite.

On June 16, 2021, Sotto made it to the final 12 man lineup at the 2021 FIBA Asia Cup qualifiers. The following year, he played in the fourth window of the 2023 FIBA World Cup qualifiers.

Sotto was included in the 21-man pool for the 2023 FIBA World Cup, where he was eventually included in the final 12-man lineup.

He played for the team during the November 2024 window of the 2025 FIBA Asia Cup qualifiers playing against New Zealand and Hong Kong. He however was rendered unavailable for the national team after sustaining an ACL injury while playing in the Japan B.League in January 2025. Sotto returned to the national team after two years in the August 2026 window of the second round of the 2027 FIBA Basketball World Cup qualifiers.

== Career statistics ==
Legend
GP	Games played	GS	Games started	MPG	Minutes per game
FG%	Field goal percentage	3P%	3-point field goal percentage	FT%	Free throw percentage
RPG	Rebounds per game	APG	Assists per game	SPG	Steals per game
BPG	Blocks per game	PPG	Points per game		Led the league

=== NBL ===
Year	Team	GP	GS	MPG	FG%	3P%	FT%	RPG	APG	SPG	BPG	PPG
2021–22	Adelaide	23	2	15.3	.508	.385	.687	4.5	0.5	0.3	0.8	7.5
2022–23	Adelaide	27	13	12.9	.514	.222	.708	4.5	0.4	0.1	0.8	6.8

=== B. League ===
Year	Team	GP	GS	MPG	FG%	3P%	FT%	RPG	APG	SPG	BPG	PPG
2022–23	Hiroshima	24	21	19.1	.518	.111	.755	6.0	1.4	0.5	1.3	8.9
2023–24	Yokohama	34	24	20.4	.577	.300	.712	6.4	0.5	0.3	1.1	12.8
2024–25	Koshigaya	26	25	27.2	.530	.500	.644	9.5	2.0	0.6	1.2	13.8
2025–26	Koshigaya	28	27	28.0	.520	.200	.678	9.4	3.0	0.5	0.9	13.1

== Personal life ==
His father, Ervin Sotto, and his godfather, Ranidel de Ocampo, played basketball professionally in the Philippine Basketball Association (PBA). Ervin Sotto stands 6 ft 7 in (2.01 m) and Pamela Sotto stands 6 ft 1 in (1.85 m). He has two siblings.

Online content creators have hyped his career, often titling their videos covering Sotto's feats and milestones as "Kai ginulat ang mundo!" (lit. 'Kai shocked the world!') which has also become an internet meme. Sotto is aware of the online phenomenon remarking that he has gotten used to it.

Sotto married actress Rere Madrid (sister of actor Ruru Madrid) on May 18, 2026. They dated for two years prior to their union. They have one child.

== Awards and accomplishments ==
=== UAAP ===
- UAAP Season 79 Juniors Rookie of the Year (2016)
- UAAP Season 80 Juniors Mythical Five (2017)
- UAAP Season 80 Juniors Finals MVP (2017)
- UAAP Season 81 Juniors MVP (2018)
- UAAP Season 81 Juniors Mythical Five (2018)

=== Australian National Basketball League ===
- NBL Fans MVP (2022, 2023)

=== Philippine national team ===
- Gold medal at the 2017 SEABA Under-16 Championship
- 2017 FIBA Under-16 Asian Championship Mythical First Team
