= Philippines men's national under-17 basketball team =

Philippines
- FIBA ranking: 35 ▼10 (December 2, 2024)
- Joined FIBA: 1936
- FIBA zone: FIBA Asia
- National federation: SBP
- Coach: LA Tenorio
- Nickname: Gilas Pilipinas

U17 World Cup
- Appearances: 3
- Medals: None

U16 Asia Cup
- Appearances: 8
- Medals: (silver) Silver: 1 (2013)
Light	Dark
Medal record
FIBA Under-16 Asia Cup
Silver medal – second place	2013 Tehran
SEABA Championship
Gold medal – first place	2011 Banting
Gold medal – first place	2013 Yogyakarta
Gold medal – first place	2015 Cagayan de Oro
Gold medal – first place	2017 Quezon City
Gold medal – first place	2023 Surabaya
Gold medal – first place	2025 San Fernando

The Philippines men's national under-16 and under-17 basketball team represents the country in junior men's under-16 and under-17 FIBA tournaments and is governed by the Samahang Basketbol ng Pilipinas.

The team was handled by Josh Reyes until 2024.

== Competitions ==
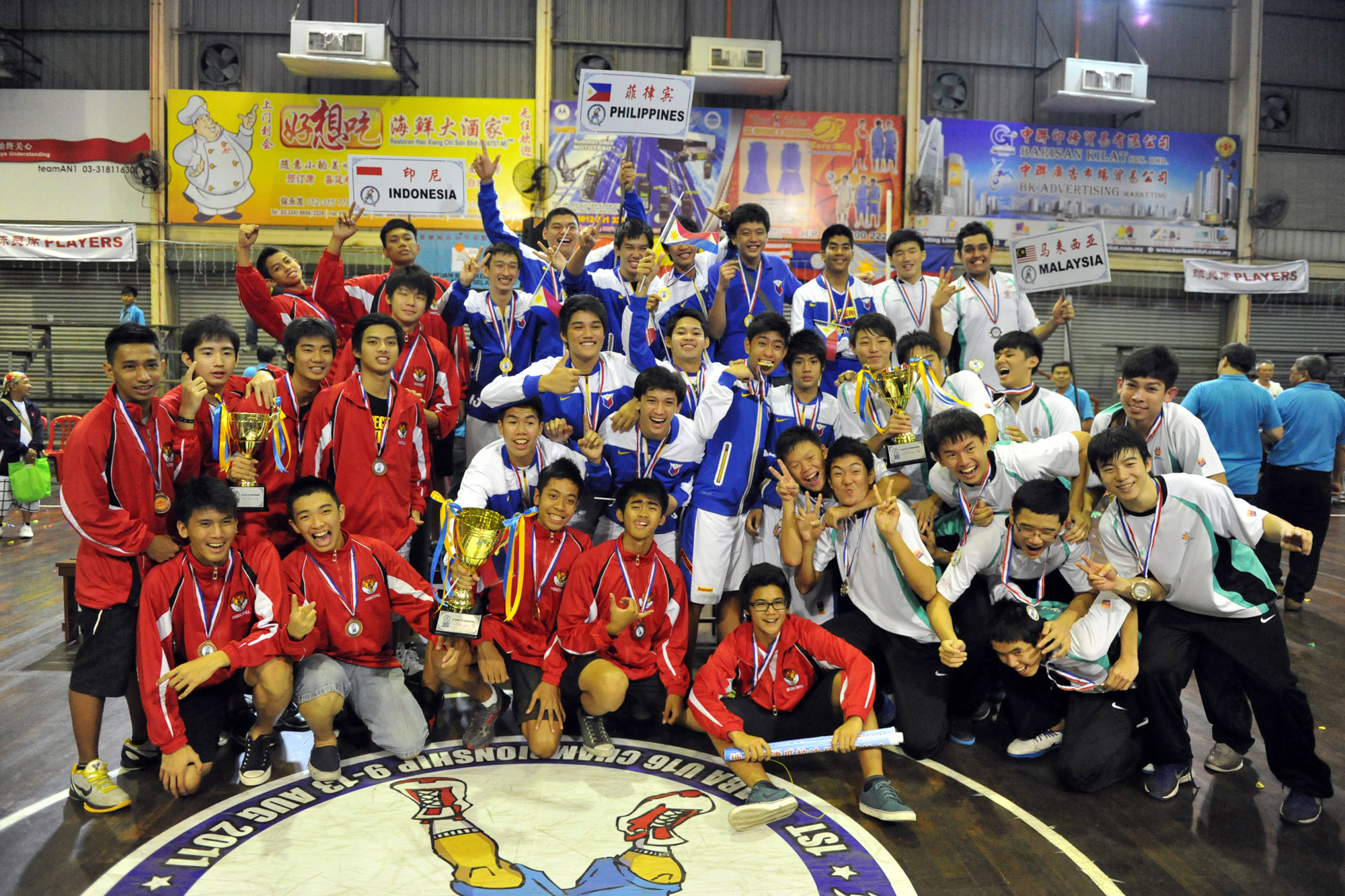
The Philippine national team (center; in blue) at the 2011 SEABA U16 Championships.

=== FIBA U17 World Cup ===
FIBA Under-17 World Cup record
Year	Position	Pld	W	L
(Germany) 2010	Did not qualify			
(Lithuania) 2012	Did not qualify			
(United Arab Emirates) 2014	15th place	7	1	6
(Spain) 2016	Did not qualify			
(Argentina) 2018	13th place	7	2	5
(Bulgaria) 2020	Cancelled due to the COVID-19 pandemic			
(Spain) 2022	Did not qualify			
(Turkey) 2024	16th place	7	0	7
(Turkey) 2026	Did not qualify			
(Greece) 2028	To be determined			
Total	3/9	21	3	18

=== FIBA U16 Asia Cup ===
FIBA Under-16 Asia Cup record
Year	Position	Pld	W	L
(Malaysia) 2009	4th place	8	5	3
(Vietnam) 2011	4th place	8	6	2
(Iran) 2013	2nd place	9	7	2
(Indonesia) 2015	5th place	8	6	2
(China) 2017	4th place	6	3	3
(Qatar) 2022	7th place	6	3	3
(Qatar) 2023	4th place	7	4	3
(Mongolia) 2025	10th place	4	1	3
Total	1 silver	56	35	21

=== SEABA U16 Championship ===
SEABA Under-16 Championship record
Year	Position	Pld	W	L
(Malaysia) 2011	1st place	4	4	0
(Indonesia) 2013	1st place	4	4	0
(Philippines) 2015	1st place	4	4	0
(Philippines) 2017	1st place	4	4	0
(Indonesia) 2023	1st place	3	3	0
(Philippines) 2025	1st place	6	6	0
Total	6 golds	25	25	0

== Team ==
=== Current roster ===
Philippines roster at the 2025 FIBA U16 Asia Cup:

Philippines Under-17 National Basketball Team roster
Players
Coaches

Pos.	No.	Name	Age – Date of birth	Height	Club
G	1	Andwele Cabanero	16 – June 19, 2009	5 ft 11 in (1.8 m)	Colegio de San Juan de Letran
G	2	Jolo Pascual	16 – March 2, 2009	6 ft 1 in (1.85 m)	University of the East
F	3	Gab de los Reyes	16 – May 8, 2009	6 ft 3 in (1.91 m)	University of the East
G	7	Ethan Tan-Chi	16 – February 7, 2009	5 ft 10 in (1.78 m)	Faith Academy
G	11	Travis Pascual	16 – May 26, 2009	5 ft 11 in (1.8 m)	Santolan High School
G	19	Jhustin Hallare	16 – April 8, 2009	6 ft 0 in (1.83 m)	UP Integrated School
F	21	Everaigne Cruz	15 – September 16, 2009	6 ft 1 in (1.85 m)	University of Santo Tomas Junior High School
PF	26	Prince Cariño	16 – August 15, 2009	6 ft 6 in (1.98 m)	Far Eastern University Diliman
F	27	Jhello Lumague	16 – February 5, 2009	6 ft 3 in (1.91 m)	Colegio de San Juan de Letran
SF	28	Brian Orca	16 – June 28, 2009	6 ft 2 in (1.88 m)	University of the East
F	45	John Restificar	16 – June 28, 2009	6 ft 3 in (1.91 m)	University of Perpetual Help System DALTA
C	61	Jeremiah Antolin	16 – February 9, 2009	6 ft 6 in (1.98 m)	St. Augustine Institute of Pampanga

Head coach

- (Philippines) LA Tenorio

Assistant coach(es)

- (Philippines) Richard del Rosario
- (Philippines) Gabe Norwood
- Age field is age on August 31, 2025

=== Past rosters ===
==== 2025 SEABA Under-16 Cup ====
Philippines roster at the 2025 FIBA U16 Asia Cup SEABA Qualifiers:

Philippines Under-17 National Basketball Team roster
Players
Coaches

Pos.	No.	Name	Age – Date of birth	Height	Club
G	1	Andwele Cabanero	15 – June 19, 2009	6 ft 0 in (1.83 m)	University of Santo Tomas Junior High School
G	2	Jolo Pascual	16 – March 2, 2009	6 ft 2 in (1.88 m)	University of the East
G	7	Ethan Tan-Chi	16 – February 7, 2009	5 ft 10 in (1.78 m)	Faith Academy
G	8	CP Miranda	15 – September 19, 2009	5 ft 9 in (1.75 m)	Far Eastern University Diliman
G	11	Travis Pascual	15 – May 26, 2009	6 ft 0 in (1.83 m)	Santolan High School
F	18	Gab de los Reyes	16 – May 8, 2009	6 ft 4 in (1.93 m)	University of the East
G	19	Jhustin Hallare	16 – April 8, 2009	6 ft 0 in (1.83 m)	UP Integrated School
F	21	Everaigne Cruz	15 – September 16, 2009	6 ft 2 in (1.88 m)	San Sebastian College – Recoletos
PF	26	Prince Cariño	15 – August 15, 2009	6 ft 6 in (1.98 m)	Far Eastern University Diliman
F	27	Jhello Lumague	16 – February 5, 2009	6 ft 4 in (1.93 m)	Colegio de San Juan de Letran
F	45	John Restificar	15 – June 28, 2009	6 ft 4 in (1.93 m)	University of Perpetual Help System DALTA
C	61	Jeremiah Antolin	16 – February 9, 2009	6 ft 7 in (2.01 m)	St. Augustine Institute of Pampanga

Head coach

- (Philippines) LA Tenorio

Assistant coach(es)

- (Philippines) Richard del Rosario
- (Philippines) Patrick Partosa
- Age field is age on May 24, 2025

==== 2024 FIBA Under-17 Basketball World Cup ====
Philippines roster at the 2024 FIBA Under-17 Basketball World Cup:

Philippines Under-17 National Basketball Team roster
Players
Coaches

Pos.	No.	Name	Age – Date of birth	Height	Club
G	0	Noah Mateo Banal	16 – November 22, 2007	6 ft 1 in (1.85 m)	Malayan Science High School
G	1	Joaquin Gabriel Ludovice	17 – January 1, 2007	5 ft 9 in (1.75 m)	University of Santo Tomas
PG	2	Elijah Mark Williams	17 – May 11, 2007	5 ft 11 in (1.8 m)	Hudson Catholic Regional High School
F	5	Paul Cyron Diao	17 – May 21, 2007	6 ft 6 in (1.98 m)	West Campus High School
PG	6	Irus Chua	17 – March 6, 2007	5 ft 11 in (1.8 m)	Brent International School
C	8	Bonn Daja	17 – January 10, 2007	6 ft 4 in (1.93 m)	Rizal Memorial Colleges
PG	11	Kurt Nathan Velasquez	17 – February 21, 2007	5 ft 11 in (1.8 m)	University of Santo Tomas
G	12	Dominic Joaquin Arejola	17 – March 20, 2007	6 ft 0 in (1.83 m)	De La Salle Zobel
G	13	Samuel Alegre	15 – July 19, 2008	6 ft 1 in (1.85 m)	Northwood High School (Irvine, California)
G	25	Cletz David Amos	17 – January 25, 2007	6 ft 1 in (1.85 m)	Brisbane State High School
F	26	Edryn Morales	17 – February 26, 2007	6 ft 4 in (1.93 m)	Manville High School
F	38	Jaime Lorenzo Gomez de Liaño	17 – January 26, 2007	6 ft 5 in (1.96 m)	UP Integrated School

Head coach

- (Philippines) Joshua Vincent Reyes

Assistant coach(es)

- (Philippines) Joseph Allen Ricardo
- (Philippines) JB Sison
- Age field is age on June 29, 2024

==== 2023 FIBA U16 Asian Championship ====
Philippines roster at the 2023 FIBA U16 Asian Championship:

Philippines Under-17 National Basketball Team roster
Players
Coaches

Pos.	No.	Name	Age – Date of birth	Height	Club
G	2	Noah Mateo Banal	15 – November 22, 2007	6 ft 1 in (1.85 m)	Malayan Science High School
G	4	Elijah Mark Williams	16 – May 11, 2007	5 ft 11 in (1.8 m)	Hudson Catholic Regional High School
F	5	Paul Cyron Diao	16 – May 21, 2007	6 ft 6 in (1.98 m)	West Campus High School
G	6	Irus Chua	16 – March 6, 2007	5 ft 11 in (1.8 m)	De La Salle Zobel
G	7	Joaquin Gabriel Ludovice	16 – January 1, 2007	5 ft 9 in (1.75 m)	University of Santo Tomas
G	9	Kiefer Alas	16 – April 4, 2007	6 ft 2 in (1.88 m)	De La Salle Zobel
G	11	Kurt Nathan Velasquez	16 – February 21, 2007	5 ft 11 in (1.8 m)	University of Santo Tomas
G	13	Samuel Alegre	15 – July 19, 2008	6 ft 1 in (1.85 m)	Northwood High School (Irvine, California)
G	25	Cletz David Amos	16 – January 25, 2007	6 ft 1 in (1.85 m)	Brisbane State High School
F	26	Edryn Morales	16 – February 26, 2007	6 ft 4 in (1.93 m)	Manville High School
C	28	Bonn Daja	16 – January 10, 2007	6 ft 4 in (1.93 m)	Rizal Memorial Colleges
F	38	Jaime Lorenzo Gomez de Liaño	16 – January 26, 2007	6 ft 5 in (1.96 m)	UP Integrated School

Head coach

- (Philippines) Joshua Vincent Reyes

Assistant coach(es)

- (Philippines) Allan Reynaldo Albano
- (Philippines) Joseph Allen Ricardo
- Age field is age on September 17, 2023

==== 2023 SEABA Under-16 Championship ====
Philippines roster at the 2023 FIBA U-16 Asian Championship SEABA Qualifiers:

Philippines Under-17 National Basketball Team roster
Players
Coaches

Pos.	No.	Name	Age – Date of birth	Height	Club
G	1	Joaquin Gabriel Ludovice	16 – January 1, 2007	5 ft 9 in (1.75 m)	University of Santo Tomas
G	4	Elijah Mark Williams	16 – May 11, 2007	5 ft 11 in (1.8 m)	Hudson Catholic Regional High School
F	5	Paul Cyron Diao	16 – May 21, 2007	6 ft 6 in (1.98 m)	West Campus High School
G	9	Kiefer Alas	16 – April 4, 2007	6 ft 2 in (1.88 m)	De La Salle Zobel
G	11	Kurt Nathan Velasquez	16 – February 21, 2007	5 ft 11 in (1.8 m)	University of Santo Tomas
F	15	Bryan Andrei Hachuela	16 – June 7, 2007	6 ft 1 in (1.85 m)
G	25	Cletz David Amos	16 – January 25, 2007	6 ft 1 in (1.85 m)	Brisbane State High School
F	26	Edryn Morales	16 – February 26, 2007	6 ft 4 in (1.93 m)	Manville High School
F	27	Ziv Gabriel Espinas	15 – May 8, 2008	6 ft 2 in (1.88 m)	Ateneo de Manila University
C	28	Bonn Ervin Daja	16 – January 10, 2007	6 ft 4 in (1.93 m)	Rizal Memorial Colleges
G	99	Gian Azriel Gomez	16 – February 8, 2007	5 ft 5 in (1.65 m)

Head coach

- (Philippines) Joshua Vincent Reyes

Assistant coach(es)

- (Philippines) Allan Reynaldo Albano
- (Philippines) Joseph Allen Ricardo
- Age field is age on July 17, 2023

==== 2022 FIBA Under-16 Asian Championship ====
Philippines roster at the 2022 FIBA U16 Asian Championship:

Philippines Under-17 National Basketball Team roster
Players
Coaches

Pos.	No.	Name	Age – Date of birth	Height	Club
C	0	Kristian Micahel Porter	17 – July 8, 2005	6 ft 5 in (1.96 m)	Ateneo de Manila University
F	1	Jayden Amier Jones	16 – March 25, 2006	6 ft 2 in (1.88 m)	Fil-Am Nation
F	3	Caelum Emmanuel Harris	17 – February 23, 2005	6 ft 5 in (1.96 m)	East-West University
F	6	Sebastian Roy Reyes	17 – April 30, 2005	6 ft 5 in (1.96 m)	Colegio de San Juan de Letran
G	7	Apl Mcandrei Gemao	16 – June 26, 2006	6 ft 0 in (1.83 m)	National University (Philippines)
F	8	Jacob Bayla	16 – November 21, 2005	6 ft 4 in (1.93 m)	Fil-Am Nation
G	9	Jared Bahay	17 – April 9, 2005	5 ft 9 in (1.75 m)	Ateneo de Cebu
G	11	Mikhail Santino Romero	17 – January 9, 2005	6 ft 1 in (1.85 m)	De La Salle University
G	12	Lorenzo Bryan Competente	17 – January 23, 2005	6 ft 2 in (1.88 m)	Citrus Valley High School
C	21	Zain Mahmood	17 – June 24, 2005	6 ft 6 in (1.98 m)	CKaTT
G	23	Lebron Joseph Nieto	17 – February 11, 2005	5 ft 11 in (1.8 m)	Ateneo Blue Eagles
C	24	Alexander Svetoslav Konov	16 – October 14, 2005	6 ft 7 in (2.01 m)	Fil-Am Nation

Head coach

- (Philippines) Joshua Vincent Reyes

Assistant coach(es)

- (Philippines) Gilbert Lao
- Age field is age on June 12, 2022

==== 2018 FIBA Under-17 Basketball World Cup ====
Philippines roster at the 2018 FIBA Under-17 Basketball World Cup:

Philippines Under-17 National Basketball Team roster
Players
Coaches

Pos.	No.	Name	Age – Date of birth	Height	Club
G	4	Forthsky Padrigao	16 – March 11, 2002	6 ft 0 in (1.83 m)	Ateneo de Manila University
G	6	Terrence Fortea	17 – July 3, 2001	5 ft 11 in (1.8 m)	National University (Philippines)
G	7	Gerry Austin Abadiano	17 – March 8, 2001	5 ft 9 in (1.75 m)
G	9	Mclaude Guadaña	17 – April 29, 2001	5 ft 11 in (1.8 m)	Lyceum of the Philippines University
G	10	Jose Miguel Pascual	17 – July 4, 2001	5 ft 11 in (1.8 m)
F	11	Recaredo Christian Calimag	17 – January 30, 2001	6 ft 1 in (1.85 m)	La Salle Green Hills
F	12	Yukien Andrada	17 – April 21, 2001	6 ft 5 in (1.96 m)	San Beda University
F	15	Carl Tamayo	17 – February 13, 2001	6 ft 7 in (2.01 m)	National University (Philippines)
F	16	Joshua Rafael Lazaro	16 – June 11, 2002	6 ft 4 in (1.93 m)	San Beda University
C	17	Geo Chiu	17 – May 18, 2001	6 ft 8 in (2.03 m)	Ateneo de Manila University
C	18	Raven Angelo Cortez	15 – October 23, 2002	6 ft 7 in (2.01 m)	De La Salle Zobel
C	19	Kai Sotto	16 – May 11, 2002	7 ft 1 in (2.16 m)	Ateneo de Manila University

Head coach

- (Philippines) Michael Oliver

Assistant coach(es)

- (Philippines) Joshua Vincent Reyes
- (Philippines) Mc Abolucion

Team Manager

- (Philippines) Andrew Teh

Legend

- (c) Team captain
- Age field is age on July 8, 2018

==== 2018 FIBA Under-16 Asian Championship ====
Philippines roster at the 5th FIBA Under-16 Asian Championship:

Philippines Under-17 National Basketball Team roster
Players
Coaches

Pos.	No.	Name	Age – Date of birth	Height	Club
F	5	Rafael Go	17 – January 8, 2001	6 ft 2 in (1.88 m)	Chiang Kai Shek College
C	6	Raven Angelo Cortez	15 – October 23, 2002	6 ft 7 in (2.01 m)	De La Salle Zobel
G	7	Mclaude Guadaña	16 – April 29, 2001	5 ft 11 in (1.8 m)	Lyceum of the Philippines University
G	8	Jorick Kyle Bautista	16 – July 29, 2001	5 ft 11 in (1.8 m)	Far Eastern University
G	10	Terrence Fortea	16 – July 3, 2001	5 ft 11 in (1.8 m)	National University (Philippines)
C	11	Kai Sotto	15 – May 11, 2002	7 ft 2 in (2.18 m)	Ateneo de Manila University
F	13	Recaredo Christian Calimag	17 – January 30, 2001	6 ft 1 in (1.85 m)	San Beda University
F	16	Joshua Rafael Lazaro	15 – June 11, 2002	6 ft 5 in (1.96 m)	San Beda University
G	18	Forthsky Padrigao	16 – March 11, 2002	6 ft 0 in (1.83 m)	Ateneo de Manila University
F	20	Yukien Andrada	16 – April 21, 2001	6 ft 5 in (1.96 m)	San Beda University
G	23	King Balaga	17 – January 23, 2001	5 ft 11 in (1.8 m)	Far Eastern University
C	24	Geo Chiu	16 – May 18, 2001	6 ft 8 in (2.03 m)	Ateneo de Manila University

Head coach

- (Philippines) Michael Oliver

Assistant coach(es)

- (Philippines) Jonas Mendoza
- (Philippines) Mc Abolucion

Team Manager

- (Philippines) Andrew Teh

Legend

- (c) Team captain
- Age field is age on April 2, 2018

==== 2017 SEABA Under-16 Championship ====
Philippines roster at the 4th SEABA Under-16 Championship:

Philippines Under-17 National Basketball Team roster
Players
Coaches

Pos.	No.	Name	Age – Date of birth	Height	Club
F	1	Recaredo Christian Calimag	16 – January 30, 2001	6 ft 1 in (1.85 m)	San Beda College
C	2	Geo Chiu	15 – May 18, 2001	6 ft 8 in (2.03 m)	Ateneo de Manila
C	3	Raven Angelo Cortez	14 – October 23, 2002	6 ft 7 in (2.01 m)	De La Salle Zobel
G	4	Terrence Fortea	15 – July 3, 2001	5 ft 11 in (1.8 m)	National University (Philippines)
F	5	Rafael Go	16 – January 8, 2001	6 ft 2 in (1.88 m)	Chiang Kai Shek College
G	6	Mclaude Guadaña	16 – April 29, 2001	5 ft 11 in (1.8 m)	Lyceum of the Philippines University
F	7	Joshua Rafael Lazaro	14 – June 11, 2002	6 ft 5 in (1.96 m)	San Beda College
F	8	John Bismarck Lina	16 – March 14, 2001	6 ft 5 in (1.96 m)	University of Santo Tomas
F	9	Miguel Roy Luis Tan	15 – March 6, 2002	6 ft 2 in (1.88 m)	Xavier School
G	10	Forthsky Padrigao	15 – March 11, 2002	6 ft 0 in (1.83 m)	Ateneo de Manila
G	11	Jose Miguel Pascual	16 – January 24, 2001	5 ft 11 in (1.8 m)	San Beda College
C	12	Kai Sotto	15 – May 11, 2002	7 ft 2 in (2.18 m)	Ateneo de Manila

Head coach

- (Philippines) Michael Oliver

Assistant coach(es)

- (Philippines) Jonas Mendoza
- (Philippines) JB Sison
- (Philippines) Mc Abolucion
- (Philippines) John Arenas

Conditioning Coach

- (Philippines) Nico D'haenen

Team Manager

- (Philippines) Andrew Teh

Assistant Team Manager

- (Philippines) Wilbert Loa

Legend

- (c) Team captain
- Age field is age on May 14, 2017

==== 2015 FIBA Asia Under-16 Championship ====
Philippines roster at the 4th FIBA Asia Under-16 Championship:

Philippines Under-17 National Basketball Team roster
Players
Coaches

Pos.	No.	Name	Age – Date of birth	Height	Club
PF	4	Jonas Raphael Tibayan	16 – January 27, 1999	6 ft 4 in (1.93 m)	Chiang Kai Shek College
SF	5	Andre Aveen Flores	16 – July 17, 1999	6 ft 2 in (1.88 m)	Ateneo de Manila
G	6	Gian Mamuyac	16 – March 5, 1999	6 ft 1 in (1.85 m)	Ateneo de Manila
SF	7	Kris Harvey Pagsanjan	16 – January 2, 1999	5 ft 11 in (1.8 m)	Hope Christian High School
G	8	John Mark Lagumen	16 – March 29, 1999	5 ft 9 in (1.75 m)	San Beda College
G	9	Jethro Publico	15 – December 1, 1999	5 ft 10 in (1.78 m)	University of the East
PG	10	Ralph Matthew Escalona	15 – January 5, 2000	5 ft 9 in (1.75 m)	Ateneo de Manila
PG	11	SJ Belangel	16 – June 27, 1999	5 ft 11 in (1.8 m)	Ateneo de Manila
SG	12	Juan Gómez de Liaño	15 – November 19, 1999	6 ft 2 in (1.88 m)	UP Integrated School
SF	13	Dave Ildefonso	15 – April 14, 2000	6 ft 3 in (1.91 m)	Ateneo de Manila
SF	14	Jason Mari Lorenzo Credo	16 – September 8, 1999	6 ft 4 in (1.93 m)	Ateneo de Manila
C	15	Will Gozum	16 – April 8, 1999	6 ft 6 in (1.98 m)	UP Integrated School

Head coach

- (Philippines) Michael Oliver

Assistant coach(es)

- (Philippines) Jonas Mendoza

Legend

- (c) Team captain
- Age field is age on October 29, 2015

==== 2015 SEABA Under-16 Championship ====
Philippines roster at the 3rd SEABA Under-16 Championship:

Philippines Under-16 National Basketball Team - 2015 SEABA Under-16 Championship Champions roster
Players
Coaches

Pos.	No.	Name	Age – Date of birth	Height	Club
F	4	Romulo Berjay	15 – September 8, 1999	6 ft 3 in (1.91 m)	Ateneo de Manila
F/C	5	Jonas Raphael Tibayan	16 – January 27, 1999	6 ft 4 in (1.93 m)	Chiang Kai Shek College
G	6	Gian Mamuyac	16 – March 5, 1999	5 ft 10 in (1.78 m)	Ateneo de Manila
G	7	Kris Harvey Pagsanjan	16 – January 2, 1999	5 ft 11 in (1.8 m)	Hope Christian High School
G	8	Jed Colonia	16 – February 23, 1999	6 ft 2 in (1.88 m)	Sacred Heart School – Ateneo de Cebu
F	9	Andre Aveen Flores	15 – July 17, 1999	6 ft 2 in (1.88 m)	Ateneo de Manila
G	10	Ralph Matthew Escalona	15 – January 5, 2000	5 ft 9 in (1.75 m)	Ateneo de Manila
G	11	SJ Belangel	15 – June 27, 1999	5 ft 11 in (1.8 m)	Ateneo de Manila
G	12	Juan Gómez de Liaño	15 – November 19, 1999	6 ft 0 in (1.83 m)	UP Integrated School
F	13	Dave Ildefonso	15 – April 14, 2000	6 ft 2 in (1.88 m)	Ateneo de Manila
F	14	Rhayyan Amsali	14 – December 28, 2000	6 ft 4 in (1.93 m)	National University (Philippines)
C	15	Will Gozum	16 – April 8, 1999	6 ft 6 in (1.98 m)	UP Integrated School

Head coach

- (Philippines) Michael Oliver

Assistant coach(es)

- (Philippines) Jonas Jaime Mendoza

Legend

- (c) Team captain
- Age field is age on April 14, 2015

==== 2014 FIBA Under-17 World Championship ====
Philippines roster at the 3rd FIBA Under-17 World Championship:

Philippines Under-17 National Basketball Team - 2014 FIBA Under-17 World Championship roster
Players
Coaches

Pos.	No.	Name	Age – Date of birth	Height	Club
SG	4	Jose IV Go	17 – January 16, 1997	5 ft 9.69 in (1.77 m)	Hope Christian High School
PG	5	Joseph Matthew Nieto	17 – May 31, 1997	6 ft 0.83 in (1.85 m)	Ateneo de Manila University
PG	6	Diego Dario	17 – January 6, 1997	5 ft 6.93 in (1.7 m)	University of the Philippines
PF	7	Michael Joseph Nieto (c)	17 – May 31, 1997	6 ft 2.02 in (1.88 m)	Ateneo de Manila University
PG	8	Lorenzo Fernando Navarro	17 – May 30, 1997	5 ft 8.11 in (1.73 m)	San Sebastian College - Recoletos
SF	9	Arnie Christian Padilla	17 – July 31, 1997	6 ft 0.83 in (1.85 m)	Far Eastern University
SG	10	Jose Lorenzo Mendoza	16 – January 31, 1998	5 ft 8.90 in (1.75 m)	Ateneo de Manila University
SG	11	Emmanuel Mikel Panlilio	16 – September 21, 1997	5 ft 10.87 in (1.8 m)	International School Manila
SF	12	Michael Louise dela Cruz	17 – April 8, 1997	6 ft 0.05 in (1.83 m)	La Salle Green Hills
C	13	Carlo Abadeza	17 – April 19, 1997	6 ft 2.80 in (1.9 m)	La Salle Green Hills
C	14	Richard Escoto	17 – March 21, 1997	6 ft 2.80 in (1.9 m)	Far Eastern University
SF	15	Paul Desiderio	17 – February 2, 1997	6 ft 0.83 in (1.85 m)	University of the Philippines

Head coach

- (Philippines) Michael Ray Jarin

Assistant coach(es)

- (Philippines) Jonas Jaime Mendoza

Legend

- (c) Team captain
- Age field is age on August 8, 2014

==== 2013 FIBA Asia Under-16 Championship ====
Philippines roster at the 3rd FIBA Asia Under-16 Championship:

Philippines Under-16 National Basketball Team - 2013 FIBA Asia Under-16 Championship Silver Medallists roster
Players
Coaches

Pos.	No.	Name	Age – Date of birth	Height	Club
G	4	Diego Dario	16 – January 6, 1997	5 ft 6.92 in (1.7 m)	UP Integrated School	(Philippines)
G	5	Joseph Matthew Nieto	16 – May 31, 1997	6 ft 0.83 in (1.85 m)	Ateneo de Manila University	(Philippines)
G	6	Lorenzo Fernando Navarro	16 – May 30, 1997	5 ft 8.11 in (1.73 m)	San Sebastian College - Recoletos	(Philippines)
C	7	Michael Joseph Nieto (c)	16 – May 31, 1997	6 ft 2.02 in (1.88 m)	Ateneo de Manila University	(Philippines)
F	8	Emmanuel Mikel Panlilio	16 – September 21, 1997	5 ft 10.86 in (1.8 m)	International School Manila	(Philippines)
F	9	Arnie Christian Padilla	16 – July 31, 1997	6 ft 0.83 in (1.85 m)	Sacred Heart School - Ateneo de Cebu	(Philippines)
G	10	Jose Lorenzo Mendoza	15 – January 31, 1998	5 ft 8.89 in (1.75 m)	Ateneo de Manila University	(Philippines)
F	11	Paul Desiderio	16 – February 2, 1997	6 ft 0.83 in (1.85 m)	University of the Philippines	(Philippines)
G	12	Jose IV Go	16 – January 16, 1997	6 ft 0.05 in (1.83 m)	Hope Christian High School	(Philippines)
C	13	Carlo Abadeza	16 – March 19, 1997	6 ft 2.80 in (1.9 m)	La Salle Green Hills	(Philippines)
C	14	Richard Escoto	16 – March 21, 1997	6 ft 6.34 in (1.99 m)	Far Eastern University – Nicanor Reyes Educational Foundation	(Philippines)
F	15	Michael Louise Dela Cruz	16 – April 8, 1997	6 ft 0.05 in (1.83 m)	La Salle Green Hills	(Philippines)

Head coach

- (Philippines) Michael Ray Jarin

Assistant coach(es)

- (Philippines) Jonas Jaime Mendoza

Legend

- (c) Team captain
- Age field is age on September 25, 2013

==== 2013 SEABA Under-16 Championship ====
Philippines roster at the 2nd SEABA Under-16 Championship:

Philippines Under-16 National Basketball Team - 2013 SEABA Under-16 Championship Champions roster
Players
Coaches

Pos.	No.	Name	Age – Date of birth	Height	Club
C	4	Richard Escoto	16 – March 21, 1997	6 ft 6.34 in (1.99 m)	Far Eastern University – Nicanor Reyes Educational Foundation
G	5	Joseph Matthew Nieto	16 – May 31, 1997	6 ft 0.83 in (1.85 m)	Ateneo de Manila University
G	6	Lorenzo Fernando Navarro	16 – May 30, 1997	5 ft 8.11 in (1.73 m)	San Sebastian College - Recoletos
C	7	Michael Joseph Nieto (c)	16 – May 31, 1997	6 ft 2.02 in (1.88 m)	Ateneo de Manila University
F	8	Michael Louise Dela Cruz	16 – April 8, 1997	6 ft 0.05 in (1.83 m)	La Salle Green Hills
F	9	Arnie Christian Padilla	15 – July 31, 1997	6 ft 0.83 in (1.85 m)	Sacred Heart School - Ateneo de Cebu
G	10	Jose Lorenzo Mendoza	15 – January 31, 1998	5 ft 8.89 in (1.75 m)	Ateneo de Manila University
	11	Armando Emmanuel II San Juan	–		La Salle Green Hills
G	12	Norrish Marc Decapia	16 – February 8, 1997		San Beda College
F	13	Ricci Rivero	15 – May 25, 1998		La Salle Green Hills
F	14	Kobe Paras	15 – September 19, 1997	6 ft 6 in (1.98 m)	La Salle Green Hills
	15	Jaime-Andres Zalamea	16 – January 27, 1997		Northfield Mount Hermon School

Head coach

- (Philippines) Michael Ray Jarin

Assistant coach(es)

- (Philippines) Jonas Jaime Mendoza

Legend

- (c) Team captain
- Age field is age on July 14, 2013

==== 2011 FIBA Asia Under-16 Championship ====
Philippines roster at the 2nd FIBA Asia Under-16 Championship:

Philippines Under-16 National Basketball Team - 2011 FIBA Asia Under-16 Championship - 4th place roster
Players
Coaches

Pos.	No.	Name	Age – Date of birth	Height	Club
G	4	Rodolfo III Alejandro (c)	16 – April 13, 1995	5 ft 8.9 in (1.75 m)	Malayan High School of Science
C	5	Michael Jay Javelosa	16 – August 1, 1995	6 ft 2.8 in (1.9 m)	Reedley International School
C	6	Isaac Go	15 – June 7, 1996	6 ft 6 in (1.98 m)	Xavier School
G	7	Tomas Gabriel Ramos	16 – January 30, 1995	6 ft 0 in (1.83 m)	Ateneo de Manila University
F	8	Rashleigh Paolo Rivero	16 – February 19, 1995	6 ft 2 in (1.88 m)	La Salle Green Hills
G	9	Hubert Cani	15 – December 9, 1995	5 ft 8.1 in (1.73 m)	National University (Philippines)
G	10	Joshua Nicolas Dalafu	16 – January 6, 1995	5 ft 10.9 in (1.8 m)	Victory Christian International School
G	11	Adven Jess Diputado	16 – January 18, 1995	5 ft 6.9 in (1.7 m)	San Beda College
G	12	Joshua Andrei Caracut	15 – January 30, 1996	5 ft 6.9 in (1.7 m)	San Beda College
G	13	Kyles Jefferson Lao	16 – June 11, 1995	5 ft 10.1 in (1.78 m)	Xavier School
G	14	Renzar Henry Asilum	15 – April 14, 1996	5 ft 6.9 in (1.7 m)	Sacred Heart School – Ateneo de Cebu
G	15	Jordan Heading	15 – January 30, 1996	6 ft 0.8 in (1.85 m)	Morrison Academy

Head coach

- (Philippines) Olsen Racela

Legend

- (c) Team captain
- Age field is age on October 18, 2011

==== 2011 SEABA Under-16 Championship ====
Philippines roster at the 1st SEABA Under-16 Championship:

Philippines Under-16 National Basketball Team - 2011 SEABA Under-16 Championship Champions roster
Players
Coaches

Pos.	No.	Name	Age – Date of birth	Height	Club
C	4	Christopher Angelo Vito	–	6 ft 4 in (1.93 m)	La Salle Green Hills
C	5	Arvin Tolentino	15 – November 5, 1995	6 ft 4 in (1.93 m)	San Beda College
G	6	Luis Edward III Brill	–	5 ft 11 in (1.8 m)	Our Lady of Good Counsel High School (Montgomery County, Maryland)
C	7	Daryl Louie Pascual	–	6 ft 5 in (1.96 m)	University of Perpetual Help System DALTA
C	8	Michael Jay Javelosa	16 – August 1, 1995	6 ft 4 in (1.93 m)	Reedley International School
G	9	Hubert Cani	15 – December 9, 1995	5 ft 8 in (1.73 m)	La Salle Green Hills
	10	Peter Amiel Murphy	–		Southville International
G	11	Adven Jess Diputado	16 – January 18, 1995	5 ft 7 in (1.7 m)	San Beda College
C	12	Gideon Ira Babilonia	–	6 ft 5 in (1.96 m)	San Beda College
G	13	Kyles Jefferson Lao	16 – June 11, 1995	5 ft 10 in (1.78 m)	Xavier School
G	14	Renzar Henry Asilum	15 – April 14, 1996	5 ft 6.9 in (1.7 m)	Sacred Heart School – Ateneo de Cebu
G	15	Ranbill Angelo Tongco	15 – February 15, 1996	5 ft 10 in (1.78 m)	San Beda College

Head coach

- (Philippines) Olsen Racela

Assistant coach(es)

- (Philippines) Nash Racela

Legend

- (c) Team captain
- Age field is age on August 9, 2011

==== 2009 FIBA Asia Under-16 Championship ====
Philippines roster at the 1st FIBA Asia Under-16 Championship:

Philippines Under-16 National Basketball Team - 2009 FIBA Asia Under-16 Championship - 4th place roster
Players
Coaches

Pos.	No.	Name	Age – Date of birth	Height	Club
G	4	Kiefer Ravena (c)	16 – October 27, 1993	5 ft 11 in (1.8 m)	Ateneo de Manila University
G	5	Von Pessumal	16 – February 12, 1993	6 ft 2 in (1.88 m)	Ateneo de Manila University
G/F	6	Jeron Teng	15 – March 21, 1994	6 ft 1 in (1.85 m)	Xavier School
G	7	Roldan Sara	16 – January 20, 1993	5 ft 8 in (1.73 m)	San Beda College
C	8	Kevin Ferrer	16 – March 26, 1993	6 ft 4 in (1.93 m)	University of Santo Tomas
G	9	Gelo Alolino	15 – January 4, 1994	5 ft 11 in (1.8 m)	University of Perpetual Help System DALTA
	10	Paolo Louis Romero	16 – November 3, 1993		Ateneo de Manila University
	11	Cederick Labing-isa	–		University of Santo Tomas
	12	Joeffrey Javillonar	16 – January 1, 1993		Rizal Technological University
	13	Nestor Bantayan Jr.	–		Adamson University
	14	Michael Anthony Pate	16 – May 15, 1993		La Salle Green Hills
G	15	Mike Tolomia	16 – January 6, 1993	5 ft 11 in (1.8 m)	Far Eastern University – Nicanor Reyes Educational Foundation

Head coach

- (Philippines) Eric Altamirano

Legend

- (c) Team captain
- Age field is age on November 19, 2009

== See also ==
- Philippines men's national basketball team
- Philippines men's national under-19 basketball team
- Philippines women's national under-16 basketball team
