= Kobe Paras =

Filipino basketball player (born 1997)

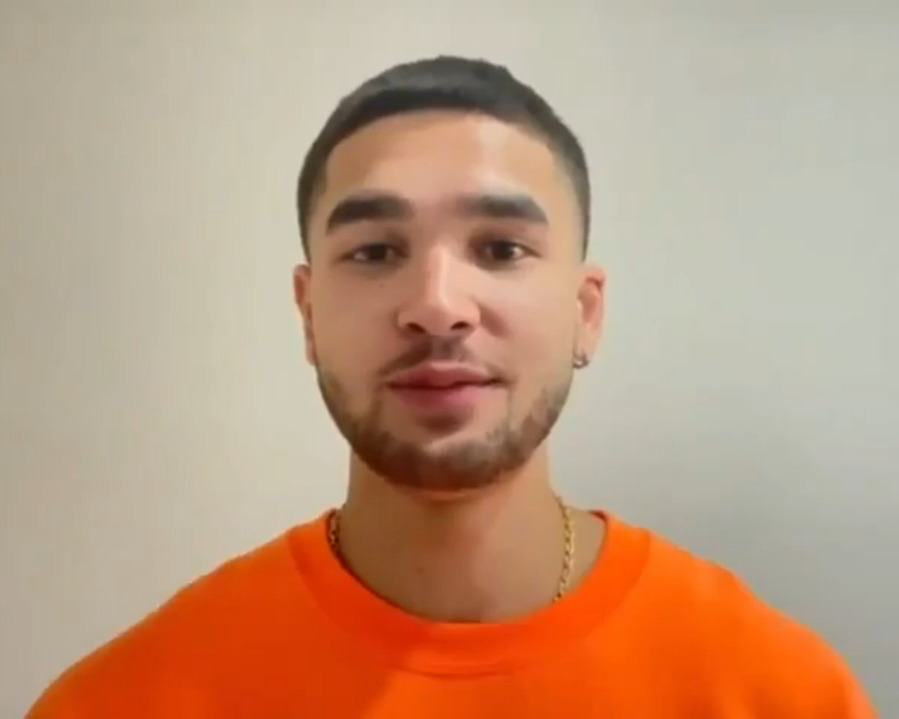
- Paras in 2021

Personal information
- Born: September 19, 1997 (age 29) Quezon City, Philippines
- Listed height: 6 ft 6 in (198 cm)
- Listed weight: 200 lb (91 kg)

Career information
- High school: La Salle Green Hills (Mandaluyong); Cathedral (Los Angeles, California); Middlebrooks Academy (Los Angeles, California)
- College: Creighton (2016–2017); Philippines Diliman (2019)
- Playing career: 2021–2023
- Position: Small forward

Career history
- 2021–2022: Niigata Albirex BB
- 2022–2023: Altiri Chiba

Career highlights
- UAAP Mythical Team (2019)
Medals
Men's basketball
Philippines
SEABA Under-16 Championship
Gold medal – first place	2013 Indonesia	Team
SEA Games
Gold medal – first place	2017 Malaysia	Team
Men's 3x3 basketball
Philippines
FIBA Under-18 World Cup Dunk Contest
Gold medal – first place	2013 Indonesia	Individual
Gold medal – first place	2015 Hungary	Individual
FIBA Asia Under-18 3x3 Championship
Gold medal – first place	2013 Thailand	Team

Kobe Lorenzo Forster Paras (born September 19, 1997) is a Filipino former professional basketball player. Listed at 6 feet 6 inches (1.98 m) and 200 pounds (91 kg), he plays the small forward position. He has been a member of the Philippine national team and the national 3x3 team.

Paras committed to play in the United States at the University of California, Los Angeles, but withdrew after the university's admissions department determined he did not meet their academic requirements. Instead, he played his freshman year for the Creighton University in 2016–17 before transferring to Cal State Northridge where he redshirted. However, he left Cal State Northridge to play college basketball for the UP Fighting Maroons of the University Athletic Association of the Philippines (UAAP). He is the son of Philippine Basketball Association (PBA) legend Benjie Paras.

== High school career ==
Paras entered Cathedral High School in Los Angeles in the middle of the 2013–14 school year where he played for the school's basketball team, the Phantoms. Prior to entering Cathedral, Paras attended La Salle Greenhills in Mandaluyong where he also played for the institution's basketball team. However, Paras decided against playing for the Phantoms for the 2015–16 school year. He would have only been eligible to play for the Phantoms until the first semester due to an eight semester limit. The eligibility limitation was due to the difference between academic years in the Philippines and the United States. He instead decided to play for Middlebrooks Academy prep team for his final year in high school while continuing to attend Cathedral. Middlebrooks is not regulated by California Interscholastic Federation (CIF) regulation, which allowed Paras to avoid the conflict between school years.

Paras prepped at Cathedral in Los Angeles, CA before playing his senior year at Middlebrooks Academy. In high school, he was an honor roll student, a member of the National Honor Society, a Star Scholar Honoree and a summa cum laude graduate. At Cathedral, he averaged 15.0 points, 4.3 rebounds and 2.5 steals as a junior and was an All-State nominee, First Team All-Del Rey League and ranked the 24th-best player in California by CalHiSports. Helped lead Cathedral to the Regional Championship game (State Final 4) and the team finished ranked No. 9 in the state and No. 1 in Division 3A of the California Interscholastic Federation (CIF). In 2015–16, Paras played his senior campaign with Middlebrooks Academy where he earned a McDonald's All-American Game nomination and the PEC-6 Conference MVP Award and helped lead Middlebrooks to the regular season PEC-6 Conference championship. He participated in several elite basketball showcases, including Adidas Nations and the Adidas All-American Camp. Also played travel basketball with Compton Magic on the Adidas grassroots circuit and was selected to the Adidas All-American Camp and the international elite showcase Adidas Nations.

=== U.S. college recruiting ===
In the United States, Paras was considered as a four-star recruit by Scout.com as well as a three-star prospect by ESPN.com and Rivals.com.

College recruiting
Name	Hometown	School	Height	Weight	Commit date
Kobe Paras; SG	Quezon City, Philippines	Cathedral High School	6 ft 6 in (1.98 m)	200 lb (91 kg)	Nov 10, 2014
Kobe Paras; SG	Recruit ratings: Scout: Rivals: 247Sports: ESPN: (74)				
Overall recruit ranking:
Note: In many cases, Scout, Rivals, 247Sports, On3, and ESPN may conflict in their listings of height and weight.; In these cases, the average was taken. ESPN grades are on a 100-point scale.; Sources: "2016 UCLA Basketball Commitment List". Rivals.; "2016 UCLA Player Commits". ESPN.; "2016 Team Ranking". Rivals.

== College career ==
=== UCLA (2016) ===
Paras committed to attend college at the University of California, Los Angeles (UCLA) and play for their Bruins basketball team. In October 2015, he signed a National Letter of Intent to join the team under coach Steve Alford, and later formally signed on November 12, 2015. However, on June 30, 2016, Paras withdrew from UCLA after failing to meet their academic requirements. Middlebrooks stated that Paras was a 100% academic qualifier for a Division I college through the NCAA Eligibility Center. Eighty Division I schools expressed interest in signing Paras.

=== Creighton University (2016–2017) ===
On July 18, 2016, the Creighton Bluejays announced they had signed Paras. Paras was the first Filipino to join the program. In 15 games with Creighton, Paras totaled 20 points and 15 rebounds in 70 total minutes on the floor. He scored a season-high six points in 12 minutes of action against Longwood on December 9, 2016. He also appeared in Creighton's NCAA opening round contest against Rhode Island where he scored three points and collected a rebound in two minutes. After finishing his freshman season and failing to secure a regular playing role, Paras subsequently withdrew from the school on April 29, 2017.

=== Cal State Northridge (2017) ===
On May 9, 2017, Paras announced, via his Twitter account, that he verbally committed to play for the Matadors, under coach Reggie Theus. Paras would have to redshirt his first year of eligibility, due to NCAA transfer rules. However, on March 9, 2018, Paras announced that he would be leaving Cal State to pursue a professional career. This move followed the firing of Cal State coach Theus and athletic director Brandon Martin. Paras never played a game with the Matadors.

=== University of the Philippines (2019) ===
On July 10, 2018, Paras announced that he will be returning to the Philippines to join the University of the Philippines Fighting Maroons, following the footsteps of his father, Benjie, who was member of the 1986 champion team, saying that UP is "the most respected educational institution in the country" and adding that "the attraction of UP is not just its basketball program, but the world-class education it is known for." Paras served a one-year residency period before he was eligible to play for the UP Fighting Maroons starting UAAP Season 82. Paras became the UAAP Player of the week on his debut as he helped the UP Fighting Maroons to clinch three straight victories. In April 2021, he left the team to seek better basketball opportunities in the United States.

== Professional career ==
=== Niigata Albirex BB (2021–2022) ===
On September 5, 2021, Paras signed with Niigata Albirex BB of the Japanese B.League. He made his debut on October 2, recording 25 points, 4 assists, and 2 steals, in a 85–81 loss to Kyoto Hannaryz. His contract expired by May 2022 and was not renewed.

=== Altiri Chiba (2022–2023) ===
After leaving Niigata Albirex, Paras moved to Altiri Chiba in June 2022, which has just been promoted to the B.League second division for the 2022–23 season. Paras parted ways with the team on March 3, 2023. Paras has reportedly retired from competitive basketball to focus on his business ventures according to his father Benjie Paras in 2026.

== National team career ==
=== Junior national team ===
Paras was part of the Philippine national team that participated at the 2013 SEABA Under-16 Championship.

He was also part of the Philippine national team that participated at the 2014 FIBA Asia Under-18 Championship that finished fifth, wherein he scored 27 points en route to a 113–105 overtime victory against Japan.

=== Senior national team ===
The Philippine national team was looking to include Paras in the senior national team as early as 2015. He was included in the initial line up for the national squad which was set to participate at the 2015 Southeast Asian Games, although he was not in the final lineup. Paras expressed openness to play for the national team provided that it would not conflict his commitments in the United States.

He joined the Philippine national team which participated at the 2017 William Jones Cup. He also played for the country in the 2017 Southeast Asian Games. Paras played sparingly in the Jones Cup and a scoreless 3:37 minutes in for the first game of the 2017 Southeast Asian Games Games against Thailand. However, he bounced back strong in succeeding games, and helped the Philippines cop its 18th SEA Games basketball gold medal on Saturday, August 26, with a 94–55 thrashing of Indonesia in the gold medal match at the MABA Stadium. Paras averaged 11.4 points, including a tournament-high 20 markers in a 95-point win over Myanmar. He found his rhythm and naturally pulled several dunk parties through the tournament and even in the final, where he was also a perfect 6-of-6 from the field for 14 points.

=== 3x3 national team ===
In 3x3 basketball, Paras represented the Philippines at the 2013 and 2015 FIBA 3x3 Under-18 World Championship. While the national team failed to win the main 3x3 tournament at both editions, He won the slam dunk championships also on both occasions.

Paras represented the Philippines in the 2017 FIBA 3x3 World Cup on June 17 to 21, 2017 in Nantes, France. Paras was named player of the day on June 18, 2017, following a win against Romania and a loss to France. They finished the tournament at 11th place.

== Career statistics ==
Legend
GP	Games played	GS	Games started	MPG	Minutes per game
FG%	Field goal percentage	3P%	3-point field goal percentage	FT%	Free throw percentage
RPG	Rebounds per game	APG	Assists per game	SPG	Steals per game
BPG	Blocks per game	PPG	Points per game	**Bold**	Career high

=== College ===
Year	Team	GP	GS	MPG	FG%	3P%	FT%	RPG	APG	SPG	BPG	PPG
2016–17	Creighton	15	0	4.7	.348	.200	.286	0.9	0.2	0.1	0.1	1.3
Career		15	0	4.7	.348	.200	.286	0.9	0.2	0.1	0.1	1.3

== Personal life ==
Paras is the son of Filipino basketball player and actor Benjie Paras, a two-time PBA Most Valuable Player and the only player in PBA history to be named Rookie of the Year and MVP in the same season, and former actress Jackie Forster. He was named after NBA legend Kobe Bryant. Paras older brother, Andre, is also a basketball player and actor. He also has two half-brothers from his father's second marriage, Riley and Sam, and two half-brothers and a half-sister from his mother's second marriage. Paras has openly discussed his struggles with mental health resulting from the pressure of his early career.

Paras previously dated Erika Rae Portunak, daughter of actress Ina Raymundo. He was in a relationship with actress Kyline Alcantara.
