= SJ Belangel =

Filipino basketball player

No. 27 – Daegu KOGAS Pegasus
- Position: Point guard
- League: KBL

Personal information
- Born: June 27, 1999 (age 27) Bacolod, Philippines
- Listed height: 5 ft 9 in (175 cm)

Career information
- High school: Ateneo (Quezon City)
- College: Ateneo
- Playing career: 2022–present

Career history
- 2022–present: Daegu KOGAS Pegasus

Career highlights
- 2× UAAP champion (2018, 2019)

Samjosef Rasmo Belangel (born June 27, 1999) is a Filipino professional basketball player for Daegu KOGAS Pegasus of the Korean Basketball League (KBL).

He played college basketball for the Ateneo Blue Eagles, winning the UAAP championships in seasons 81 (2018) and 82 (2019). Internationally, he has represented the Philippines national team since the under-16 level and has played in the 2022 FIBA Asia Cup.

== Early life and education ==
SJ Belangel was born in Bacolod on June 27, 1999 to Sammy Belangel and Mayette Belangel (née Rasmo). His father is a former college basketball player.

Belangel studied in the Ateneo education system, first moving to the Ateneo High School in ninth grade. He graduated from the Ateneo de Manila University with a degree in interdisciplinary studies in 2022.

== High school and college career ==
Hailing from Bacolod, SJ Belangel has suited up for the teams of Eliakim Learning School, USLS-Integrated School, St. Joseph's Academy–Iloilo, and Bacolod Tay Tung High School prior to joining Ateneo High School. He developed a reputation as a scorer during his early years. It was with St. Joseph's Academy that he once scored 99 points in a game, then scored 85 points and 65 points for Bacolod Tay Tung High School.

He also took part and won the Batang Pinoy 3x3 national competition held in Bacolod in 2014.

He moved to Ateneo High School and played for the Blue Eaglets after he scouted by its coach Joe Silva. He turned down offers to attend La Salle Green Hills and De La Salle Zobel despite his family having a largely La Sallian background. In Season 79, he barely missed out on the Juniors MVP award, and scored a season-high 32 points. He ended his stint with the Eaglets in 2018 by helping them clinch the UAAP Season 80 junior title and earned a place in the Mythical Five for himself.

Belangel would commit to Ateneo, and entered Ateneo de Manila University for his college studies. He made his UAAP senior debut for the Tab Baldwin-mentored Ateneo Blue Eagles in Season 81. He played for three UAAP seasons featuring in 48 games played, averaging 7.38 points and 2.08 assists per contest.

== Professional career ==
=== Daegu KOGAS Pegasus (2022–present) ===
In June 2022, Belangel decided to forego his two years of eligibility left to play for Ateneo. He decided to turn professional and play for the Daegu KOGAS Pegasus of the Korean Basketball League.

Belangel debuted with 10 points and two three-pointers in a loss to the Jeonju KCC Egis. He struggled at first in his rookie season, as there were times he was benched during the season. He averaged only seven points and two assists in less than 19 minutes per game, shooting 27.9% from three.

In his second year in Korea, Belangel got more minutes under new head coach Kang Hyuk and with Lee Dae-sung leaving the team. He averaged 12.6 points and improved his shooting from the field and from three. That year, he led Daegu to 21 wins and was rewarded with a two-year extension.

In the 2024–25 season, Belangel reached the 1,100 point milestone. He also made the All-Star team alongside Filipino-American import Ethan Alvano. In a win over the Seoul Samsung Thunders, he had a KBL career-high 36 points with eight assists. He made his first playoff appearance with Daegu in the quarterfinals and finished the season with averages of 14.2 points, 2.9 rebounds, 4.7 assists, and 1.6 steals.

The following season saw Belangel increase his averages to 15.8 points, 4.7 assists, 2.8 rebounds, and 1.2 steals on 42.6% shooting in 53 games, earning another two-year extension.

== National team career ==
=== Junior national team ===
Belangel has played for the Philippine national team. He played for the national under-16 team in the 2015 FIBA Asia Under-16 Championship as its captain.

=== Senior national team ===
For the senior team, he took part in the 2020 FIBA Men's Olympic Qualifying Tournament in Belgrade and the 2022 FIBA Asia Cup qualifiers.

On June 16, 2021, during the qualifiers for the 2022 FIBA Asia Cup, the Philippines and South Korea were tied 78–78 with two seconds remaining. Belangel converted Dwight Ramos' inbound into the buzzer-beating three-pointer that clinched the 81–78 win for the Philippines.

In the 2022 FIBA Asia Cup, he was on the team failed to qualify for the quarterfinals.

== Personal life ==
Belangel has a girlfriend, Isabel Cruz.

Belangel is an active NBA 2K gamer. In 2023, he was called up to the Philippine national NBA 2K e-sports training pool. He has also founded 1of1 Esports, a professional esports organization that competes in NBA 2K and Honor of Kings competitions.
