= Malaysia men's national under-16 basketball team =

Malaysia
- FIBA ranking: 74 ▼5 (December 2024)
- Joined FIBA: 1957
- FIBA zone: FIBA Asia
- National federation: Malaysia Basketball Association
- Coach: Lee Kheng Tian

U17 World Cup
- Appearances: None

U16 Asia Cup
- Appearances: 7
- Medals: None

The Malaysia men's national under-16 basketball team is a national basketball team of Malaysia, administered by the Malaysia Basketball Association. It represents the country in international under-16 men's basketball competitions.

== Competitions ==
=== FIBA Under-16 Asia Cup ===
FIBA Under-16 Asia Cup record
Year	Position	Pld	W	L
(Malaysia) 2009	11th	7	4	3
(Vietnam) 2011	13th	4	1	3
(Iran) 2013	9th	8	3	5
(Indonesia) 2015	11th	8	2	6
(China) 2017	10th	3	0	3
(Qatar) 2022	Did not participate			
(Qatar) 2023	12th	4	1	3
(Mongolia) 2025	11th	4	1	3
Total	7/8	38	12	26

=== SEABA Under-16 Cup ===
SEABA Under-16 Cup record
Year	Position	Pld	W	L
(Malaysia) 2011	2nd	4	3	1
(Indonesia) 2013	3rd	4	2	2
(Philippines) 2015	2nd	4	3	1
(Philippines) 2017	2nd	4	3	1
(Indonesia) 2023	2nd	3	1	2
(Philippines) 2025	3rd	6	3	3
Total	6/6 4 silvers 2 bronzes	25	15	10

== Roster (2017) ==
Malaysia's national team at the 2017 Asia U-16 Championship.

Malaysia's roster at the 5th FIBA U16 Asian Championship:

Malaysia Under-17 National Basketball Team roster
Players
Coaches

Pos.	No.	Name	Age – Date of birth	Height	Club
G	0	Yi Kang Teoh	16 – November 16, 2001	5 ft 7 in (1.7 m)
G	3	Run Sam Yap	16 – May 5, 2001	5 ft 10 in (1.78 m)
F	6	Thiam Mun Wong	17 – February 16, 2001	5 ft 11 in (1.8 m)
F	7	Wei Han Teoh	16 – April 10, 2001	6 ft 2 in (1.88 m)
F	8	Wilson Lee	16 – February 9, 2002	6 ft 2 in (1.88 m)
G	9	Jason Khor	16 – June 2, 2001	5 ft 11 in (1.8 m)
G	11	Adrie Adlan Rashid	17 – January 29, 2001	5 ft 11 in (1.8 m)
C	13	Jing Hung Lee	17 – January 29, 2001	6 ft 3 in (1.91 m)
C	19	Ee Wan Tan	17 – March 6, 2001	6 ft 1 in (1.85 m)
G	21	Jun Xin Foo	16 – April 11, 2001	5 ft 10 in (1.78 m)
F	25	John Tang	16 – May 19, 2001	6 ft 0 in (1.83 m)
F	98	Chee Wei Tan	17 – January 27, 2001	6 ft 1 in (1.85 m)

Head coach

- (Malaysia) Lee Kheng Tian

Assistant coach(es)

- (Malaysia) Ee Kee Lip
- (Malaysia) Ramesh Chandra

Legend

- Age field is age on April 2, 2018

== See also ==
- Malaysia men's national basketball team
- Malaysia men's national under-19 basketball team
- Malaysia women's national under-16 basketball team
