= Singapore men's national under-16 basketball team =

Singapore
- FIBA zone: FIBA Asia
- National federation: Basketball Association of Singapore

U17 World Cup
- Appearances: None

U16 Asia Cup
- Appearances: 1 (2009)
- Medals: None

The Singapore men's national under-16 basketball team is a national basketball team of Singapore, administered by the Basketball Association of Singapore. It represents the country in men's international under-16 basketball competitions.

== FIBA Under-16 Asia Cup ==
So far, Singapore's only participation at the FIBA Under-16 Asia Cup was in 2009, where they finished in 14th place.

== See also ==
- Singapore men's national basketball team
- Singapore men's national under-18 basketball team
- Singapore women's national under-16 basketball team
