= Thailand men's national under-16 basketball team =

Thailand
- FIBA zone: FIBA Asia
- National federation: Basketball Sport Association of Thailand

U17 World Cup
- Appearances: None

U16 Asia Cup
- Appearances: 3
- Medals: None

The Thailand men's national under-16 basketball team is a national basketball team of Thailand, administered by the Basketball Sport Association of Thailand. It represents the country in men's international under-16 basketball competitions.

== FIBA U16 Asia Cup participations ==
Year	Result
2009	16th
2013	13th
2015	7th

== See also ==
- Thailand men's national basketball team
- Thailand men's national under-18 basketball team
- Thailand women's national under-16 basketball team
