= Indonesia men's national under-16 basketball team =

Indonesia U-16
- FIBA zone: FIBA Asia
- National federation: PERBASI

FIBA U-17 World Cup
- Appearances: None

FIBA U-16 Asia Cup
- Appearances: 4
- Medals: None

The Indonesia men's national under-16 basketball team is a national basketball team of Indonesia, administered by the Indonesian Basketball Association ("PERBASI"). It represents the country in international under-16 men's basketball competitions.

== FIBA Under-16 Asia Cup participations ==
Year	Result
2011	7th
2015	10th
2022	11th
2025	13th

== Current roster ==
Indonesia U16 roster
Players
Coaches

Pos.	No.	Name	Age – Date of birth	Height	Club	Ctr.
SG	3	Marshall Farez Al Hadi	16 – February 9, 2009	1.84 m (6 ft 0 in)	Rajawali Bandung	(Indonesia)
SG	6	Muhammad Fakhrizal Firdaus	15 – October 24, 2010	1.78 m (5 ft 10 in)	AKJ Semarang	(Indonesia)
SG	9	Justin Cleine Sasongko	16 – September 9, 2009	1.78 m (5 ft 10 in)	Biffi Surabaya	(Indonesia)
SG	12	Gede Dio Arghya Naranatha	16 – October 15, 2009	1.83 m (6 ft 0 in)	Merpati Bali	(Indonesia)
PG	22	Benjamin Piet Hernusi	16 – January 22, 2009	1.78 m (5 ft 10 in)	Aras Gading Muda	(Indonesia)
C	24	Seiya Yabe	16 – March 13, 2009	1.95 m (6 ft 5 in)	Dewa United Banten BC	(Indonesia)
PG	31	Miracle Christiano	15 – June 2, 2010	1.77 m (5 ft 10 in)	Airone Jakarta	(Indonesia)
PF	34	Rafky Abqary Basri	16 – January 11, 2009	1.88 m (6 ft 2 in)	Victoria Basketball	(Indonesia)
PF	55	Steven Sebastian	16 – April 11, 2009	1.89 m (6 ft 2 in)	Cendrawasih Bandung	(Indonesia)
SG	57	Taraka Tanady	15 – May 30, 2010	1.75 m (5 ft 9 in)	Aras Gading Muda	(Indonesia)
C	77	Bryan Gilbert	15 – January 20, 2010	1.91 m (6 ft 3 in)	The Lion Surabaya	(Indonesia)
SF	91	Galih Putra Kharisma	15 – March 5, 2010	1.86 m (6 ft 1 in)	Biffi Surabaya	(Indonesia)

Head coach

- (Indonesia) Parna Abrizalt Hasiholan

Assistant coach(es)

- (Indonesia) Risto Gerol Foekh

Legend

- Club – describes last
  club before the tournament
- Age – describes age

== See also ==
- Indonesia men's national basketball team
- Indonesia men's national under-18 basketball team
- Indonesia women's national under-16 basketball team
