= List of 2016 IBL Indonesia Rookie Player =

Pos	No	Name	Club	Nationality	School / University
PG	1	Widyanta Putra Teja	Aspac Jakarta	Indonesia	IPH Schools Surabaya
C	2	Anthony Ray Hargrove Jr	Aspac Jakarta	United States	Far Eastern University
SG/SF	3	Brandon Jawato	Pelita Jaya Energi Mega Persada	United States	University of Hawaii at Manoa
PG	4	Anthony Wayne Cates Jr	Pelita Jaya Energi Mega Persada	United States	
PG	5	Ricky Istiadi	Pelita Jaya Energi Mega Persada	Indonesia	
PG	6	Andrey Mahardika	Pelita Jaya Energi Mega Persada	Indonesia	Bakrie University Jakarta
SG	7	Yerikho Tuasela	Pacific Caesar Surabaya	Indonesia	University of Surabaya
C	8	Dicka Nugraha	Pacific Caesar Surabaya	Indonesia	University of Surabaya
C	9	Bayu Armandito	Pacific Caesar Surabaya	Indonesia	University of Surabaya
SG	10	Hans Abraham	Satria Muda BritAma Jakarta	Indonesia	Pelita Harapan University
SF	11	M. Sandy Aziz	Satria Muda BritAma Jakarta	Indonesia	
PF	12	Juan Laurent Kokodiputra	Satria Muda BritAma Jakarta	Indonesia	Pelita Harapan University
C	13	Muhammad Surya Jayadiwangsa	Satria Muda BritAma Jakarta	Indonesia	
C	14	Fahad Basyarahl	Bimasakti Nikko Steel Malang	Indonesia	SMA 8 Malang
PG	15	Winarya Panji Iqbal	Bimasakti Nikko Steel Malang	Indonesia	
PF	16	Jamarr Andre Johnson	CLS Knights Surabaya	United States	
PF/C	17	Moh Saroni	CLS Knights Surabaya	Indonesia	University of Surabaya
C	18	Devucanizar Negara	CLS Knights Surabaya	Indonesia	University of Surabaya
PG	19	Rodmundus Ray	CLS Knights Surabaya	Indonesia	University of Surabaya
PG	20	Heronimus Hiro Londa	CLS Knights Surabaya	Australia	
SF	21	Hengki Infandi	Garuda Bandung	Indonesia	
F/C	22	Melkisedek Basik	Garuda Bandung	Indonesia	
PG	23	Gabriel Batitusta Risky	Garuda Bandung	Indonesia	
SG	24	Andre Adriano	Satya Wacana Metro LBC Bandung	Indonesia	
SG	25	Prio Dwi Handoko	Satya Wacana Metro LBC Bandung	Indonesia	
PG	26	Rizky Wisnu Shandika	Satya Wacana Metro LBC Bandung	Indonesia	
SG	27	Andrian Ariadi	Satya Wacana Metro LBC Bandung	Indonesia	
PG	28	Elyakim Tampa'i	Satya Wacana Metro LBC Bandung	Indonesia	
C	29	Vincent Sanjaya	Satya Wacana Metro LBC Bandung	Indonesia	
SF	30	Andreas Rismawan	Satya Wacana Metro LBC Bandung	Indonesia	
PG	31	Brandon Billy Punyanan	Muba Hangtuah Indonesia Muda Sumatera Selatan	Indonesia	
PF	32	Luca Lioteza	Muba Hangtuah Indonesia Muda Sumatera Selatan	Indonesia	
C	33	Frida Susanto	Muba Hangtuah Indonesia Muda Sumatera Selatan	Indonesia	
PG	34	Nafil Alfaizar Adam	JNE Bandung Utama	Indonesia	
PG	35	Michael Willie Gee	NSH GMC Jakarta	Indonesia	
PG	36	Benny Wijaya (Basketball)	NSH GMC Jakarta	Indonesia	
SF	37	Papin Robertus Nadapdap	Stadium Jakarta	Indonesia	Pelita Harapan University
SF	38	Abraham Damar Grahita	Stadium Jakarta	Indonesia	Esa Unggul University
PF	39	John Michael Dagatan Noble	Stadium Jakarta	Indonesia	
