= Basketball at the 2025 SEA Games =

2025 SEA Games Basketball Tournament
- 2025

Tournament details
- Games: 2025 SEA Games
- Host nation: Thailand
- Venue: Nimibutr Stadium
- Duration: 13–19 December 2025

Men's tournament
- Teams: 7

Women's tournament
- Teams: 6

Tournaments
← 2023	2027 →

Basketball was among the sports contested at the 2025 SEA Games at the Nimibutr Stadium in Bangkok, Thailand.

In August 2025, it was reported that players only needed to have the appropriate passport however this was only clarified in November. Naturalized players as well as any other player who obtained the relevant passport after age 16 are not eligible to play in the standard 5x5 tournaments.

== Participating nations ==
Nation	Men	Women
Indonesia	Yes	Yes
Malaysia	Yes	Yes
Myanmar	Yes	No
Philippines	Yes	Yes
Singapore	Yes	Yes
Thailand	Yes	Yes
Vietnam	Yes	Yes
Total: 7 NOCs	7	6

== Medalists ==
Event	Gold	Silver	Bronze
Men's tournament	Philippines; Thirdy Ravena; Bobby Ray Parks Jr. Dalph Panopio; Abu Tratter; Matthew Wright; Robert Bolick; Poy Erram; Cedrick Manzano; Jamie Malonzo; Veejay Pre; Justin Chua; Von Pessumal	Thailand	Indonesia; Abraham Damar Grahita; Yudha Saputera; Rio Disi; Julian Chalias; Derrick Michael Xzavierro; Neo Putu Pande; Hendrick Xavi Yonga; Andakara Prastawa; Agassi Goantara; Dame Diagne; Patrick Nikolas; Ponsianus Nyoman Indrawan
Women's tournament	Philippines; Khate Castillo; Sarah Heyn; Afril Bernardino; Chack Cabinbin; Janine Pontejos; Angel Surada; Louna Ozar; Sophia Dignadice; Trina Guytingco; Karl Ann Pingol; Kacey Dela Rosa; Monique del Carmen	Thailand	Indonesia; Lea Elvensia Wolobubo Kahol; Agustin Elya Gradita Retong; Erinindita Prias Madafa; Dewa Ayu Made Sriartha Kusuma Dewi; Faizzatus Shoimah; Adelaide Callista Wongsohardjo; Yuni Anggraeni; Jesslyn Angelique Aritonang; Nathania Claresta Orville; Gabriel Sophia; Clarita Antonio; Angelica Jennifer Candra
