= 2010–11 NBL Indonesia season =

2010–11 NBL Indonesia
- League: NBL Indonesia
- Sport: Basketball
- Duration: 16 October 2010 – 13 March 2011
- TV partner(s): antv, Vision 1 Sports

Regular season
- Regular season champions: Pelita Jaya
- Season MVP: I Made Sudiadnyana (Garuda Bandung)
- Top scorer: I Made Sudiadnyana (Garuda Bandung)

Championship
- Finals champions: Satria Muda BritAma Jakarta (1st NBL Indonesia title) (6th Indonesia title overall)

NBL Indonesia seasons
- 2011-12 →

The 2010-11 NBL Indonesia is the first season of NBL Indonesia, a nationwide basketball competition which previously known as Indonesian Basketball League (IBL).

== Participating teams ==
| Team | Base | Head coach |
|---|---|---|
| Dell Aspac | Jakarta | Tjetjep Firmansyah |
| Bima Sakti Nikko Steel | Malang | Eddy Santoso |
| Citra Satria Jakarta | Jakarta | Bintoro |
| Nuvo CLS Knights | Surabaya | W. Amran |
| Garuda Flexi | Bandung | Johannis Winar |
| Muba Hangtuah IM Sumsel | South Sumatra | Nathaniel Canson |
| Pelita Jaya Esia | Jakarta | Rastafari Horongbala |
| Satria Muda BritAma | Jakarta | Fictor Gideon Roring |
| Satya Wacana Angsapura | Salatiga | Danny Kosasih |
| Stadium Jakarta | Jakarta | Abdurrachman Padang |

== Competition format ==
Participating teams compete in the regular season using home tournament format. The regular season divided into 5 series, each with different host cities. The top teams in final overall standings will continue to the championship playoffs.

There is also a pre-season warm-up tournament held before the regular season.

| Series | Venue | Schedule |
|---|---|---|
| Pre-Season Tournament | Malang | 7–15 July 2010 |
| Series 1 | Surabaya | 16–24 October 2010 |
| Series 2 | Bandung | 20–28 November 2010 |
| Series 3 | Solo | 11–19 December 2010 |
| Series 4 | Denpasar | 8–16 January 2011 |
| Series 5 | Jakarta | 5–13 February 2011 |
| Championship Playoffs | Surabaya | 8–13 March 2011 |

== Regular season ==
=== Standings ===
| Pos | Team | Pld | W | L | PF | PA | PD | Pts |
|---|---|---|---|---|---|---|---|---|
| 1 | Pelita Jaya | 27 | 24 | 3 | 2080 | 1542 | +538 | 51 |
| 2 | Satria Muda | 27 | 24 | 3 | 1900 | 1487 | +413 | 51 |
| 3 | Aspac Jakarta | 27 | 20 | 7 | 1862 | 1539 | +323 | 47 |
| 4 | CLS Knights | 27 | 19 | 8 | 1825 | 1443 | +382 | 46 |
| 5 | Garuda Flexi | 27 | 17 | 10 | 1738 | 1546 | +192 | 44 |
| 6 | Stadium Jakarta | 27 | 12 | 15 | 1573 | 1641 | -68 | 39 |
| 7 | Muba Hangtuah | 27 | 9 | 18 | 1561 | 1769 | -208 | 36 |
| 8 | Bima Sakti | 27 | 6 | 21 | 1442 | 1894 | -452 | 33 |
| 9 | Satya Wacana | 27 | 2 | 25 | 1433 | 1976 | -543 | 29 |
| 10 | Citra Satria | 27 | 2 | 25 | 1383 | 1960 | -577 | 29 |

Updated to games played on 13 February 2011.

== Individual awards ==
Most Valuable Player : I Made Sudiadnyana, (Garuda Bandung)

Rookie of the Year : Valentino Wuwungan, (Satya Wacana Angsapura)

Coach of the Year : Rastafari Horongbala, (Pelita Jaya)

Defensive Player of the Year : Isman Thoyib, (Aspac Jakarta)

2011 NBL Indonesia All-First Team

1. G: Faisal Julius Achmad (Satria Muda BritAma)
2. F: Ary Chandra (Pelita Jaya Esia)
3. F: I Made Sudiadnyana (Garuda Bandung)
4. C/F: Dian Heryadi (Muba Hangtuah)
5. F/C: Rony Gunawan (Satria Muda BritAma)

== Playoffs ==
=== Bracket ===
All matches were played in DBL Arena Surabaya, East Java.

Quarterfinals
1 | Pelita Jaya Esia | 82
8 | Bima Sakti Nikko Steel Malang | 55
4 | Nuvo CLS Knights | 57
5 | Garuda Flexi Bandung | 45
2 | Satria Muda BritAma | 86
7 | Muba Hangtuah IM Sumsel | 53
3 | Dell Aspac Jakarta | 71
6 | Stadium Jakarta | 65

Semifinals
1 | Pelita Jaya Esia | 53
4 | Nuvo CLS Knights | 68
2 | Satria Muda BritAma | 76
3 | Dell Aspac Jakarta | 69

Final
4 | Nuvo CLS Knights | 50
2 | Satria Muda BritAma | 67

=== Game Info ===
==== Quarterfinals ====
ANTV

Tuesday, 08 March 2011
13:00 WIB

Game Info

Nuvo CLS Knights 57, Garuda Flexi Bandung 45
Scoring by quarter: 20-8, 11–13, 18–17, 8–7
| Pts: Agustinus Indrajaya (10); Rebs: Agustinus Indrajaya (9); Asts: Dimaz Muharri (5) | Pts: Denny Sumargo (15); Rebs: Denny Sumargo, I Made Sudiadnyana (8); Asts: I Made Sudiadnyana, Wendha Wijaya, Hendru Ramli (2) |

DBL Arena Surabaya, East Java

---

Tuesday, 08 March 2011
15:00 WIB

Game Info

Pelita Jaya Esia 82, Bima Sakti Nikko Steel Malang 55
Scoring by quarter: 12-6, 22–16, 25–15, 23–17
| Pts: Andy Poedjakesuma (21); Rebs: Andy Poedjakesuma, Romy Christanto Chandra (7); Asts: Erick Christopher Sebayang (3) | Pts: Yanuar Dwi Priasmoro (15); Rebs: Bima Rizky Ardiansyah (7); Asts: Denny Sartika (5) |

DBL Arena Surabaya, East Java

---

Wednesday, 09 March 2011
17:00 WIB

Game Info

Satria Muda BritAma 86, Muba Hangtuah IM Sumsel 53
Scoring by quarter: 28-15, 20–9, 31–12, 7-17
| Pts: Christian Ronaldo Sitepu (22); Rebs: Christian Ronaldo Sitepu (9); Asts: Rony Gunawan, Faisal Julius Achmad (4) | Pts: Buggi Setiawan (20); Rebs: Max Yanto (8); Asts: Robert Santo Yunarto, Tri Wilopo (2) |

DBL Arena Surabaya, East Java

---

Wednesday, 09 March 2011
19:00 WIB

Game Info

Dell Aspac Jakarta 71, Stadium Jakarta 65
Scoring by quarter: 13-12, 31–27, 9–16, 18–10
| Pts: Xaverius Prawiro (25); Rebs: Muhammad Isman Thoyib (6); Asts: Rizky Effendi (3) | Pts: Merio Ferdiansyah (27); Rebs: Daniel Iskandar (12); Asts: Merio Ferdiansyah, Dino Leonardo, Ruslan, Fanny Budianto, Anton Sujarwo (2) |

DBL Arena Surabaya, East Java

==== Semifinals ====
ANTV

Thursday, 10 March 2011
13:00 WIB

Game Info

Pelita Jaya Esia 53, Nuvo CLS Knights 68
Scoring by quarter: 13-23, 12-18, 5-17, 23-10
| Pts: Ary Chandra (10); Rebs: Kelly Purwanto Ari Nugroho (6); Asts: Kelly Purwanto Ari Nugroho (4) | Pts: Sandy Febiansyakh (19); Rebs: Dimaz Muharri (7); Asts: Agustinus Indrajaya, Dimaz Muharri (3) |

DBL Arena Surabaya, East Java

---

Friday, 11 March 2011
19:00 WIB

Game Info

Satria Muda BritAma 76, Dell Aspac Jakarta 69
Scoring by quarter: 18-14, 16-16, 21-27, 21-12
| Pts: Faisal Julius Achmad (26); Rebs: Youbel Sondakh (10); Asts: Faisal Julius Achmad (4) | Pts: Pringgo Regowo (17); Rebs: Pringgo Regowo (8); Asts: Dirk Mathew Mario Gerungan, Antonius Joko Endratmo (2) |

DBL Arena Surabaya, East Java

==== 3rd place game ====
---

Sunday, 13 March 2011
18:00 WIB

Game Info

Pelita Jaya Esia 62, Dell Aspac Jakarta 61
Scoring by quarter: 10-16, 9-16, 22-12, 21-17
| Pts: Dimas Aryo Dewanto (11); Rebs: Kelly Purwanto Ari Nugroho (6); Asts: Dimas Aryo Dewanto (5) | Pts: Vinton Nolland Surawi (13); Rebs: Pringgo Regowo (8); Asts: Dirk Mathew Mario Gerungan (4) |

DBL Arena Surabaya, East Java

==== Final ====
ANTV

Sunday, 13 March 2011
21:00 WIB

Game Info

Nuvo CLS Knights 50, Satria Muda BritAma 67
Scoring by quarter: 16-13, 13-22, 13-17, 8-15
| Pts: Rachmad Febri Utomo (18); Rebs: Sandy Febiansyakh (6); Asts: Dimaz Muharri (3) | Pts: Amin Prihantono (16); Rebs: Rony Gunawan (10); Asts: Youbel Sondakh (5) |

DBL Arena Surabaya, East Java
