= 2022 Indonesian Basketball League =

2022 IBL Tokopedia
- League: Indonesian Basketball League
- Sport: Basketball
- Duration: 15 January – 30 March 2022 (regular season); 13–30 August 2022 (post season)
- TV partner(s): Moji (free-to-air); Usee Sports (IPTV); Vidio (streaming)

2021 IBL Draft
- Top draft pick: Mochammad Noval Mahadi
- Picked by: Tangerang Hawks

Regular season
- Top seed: Pelita Jaya Bakrie
- Season MVP: Abraham Damar Grahita
- Top scorer: Shavar Newkirk

Playoffs
- Finals champions: Satria Muda Pertamina
- Runners-up: Pelita Jaya Bakrie
- Finals MVP: Brachon Griffin

IBL Indonesia seasons
- ← 2021 2023 →

The 2022 Indonesian Basketball League (known as IBL Tokopedia for sponsorship reasons) was the seventh season of the Indonesian Basketball League since the re-branding by Starting5. After successfully implemented the "bubble" system in last year's season, IBL decided to return into the Series format with the supporters are returning into stadium. The season would be held with implementing strict health protocols that recommended by the government. The regular season began on 15 January 2022 and was suspended on 2 February 2022 until 3 March 2022, then the remaining series at the regular season in Yogyakarta, Solo, Surabaya, Denpasar, as well as the post season in Bandung has been cancelled as a result of the COVID-19 pandemic. The series return again to "bubble" after many players get COVID-19.

== Schedule and location ==
Phase	Round	Date	Arena
Regular season	Series I	15-22 January 2022	Hall A Senayan, Jakarta
Regular season	Series II	29 January – 1 February 2022	C-Tra Arena, Bandung
Regular season	Series III	3-30 March 2022	Hall A Senayan, Jakarta (IBL Bubble)
All Star		31 March 2022	Hall A Senayan, Jakarta
Playoffs (Best of three)	First Round	13-16 August 2022	C-Tra Arena, Bandung
Playoffs (Best of three)	Semi-finals	20-23 August 2022	C-Tra Arena, Bandung
Playoffs (Best of three)	Finals	27-30 August 2022	C-Tra Arena, Bandung

Locations of 2021 IBL season.
Red: Red Region; White: White Region; Blue: Series location;

=== Homebase ===
Teams	Home	Club City
Amartha Hangtuah	Margasatwa Basketball Court	Jakarta
Bali United BC	GOR Praja Raksasa Kepaon	Denpasar
DNA Bima Perkasa	Among Rogo Sports Hall	Yogyakarta
Bumi Borneo	GOR Pangsuma	Pontianak
Dewa United BC	DBL Arena	Surabaya
Evos Thunder	GOR Laga Tangkas	Bogor
Indonesia Patriots	Hall A Senayan	Jakarta
NSH Mountain Gold	GOR MSC	Timika
Pacific Caesar	GOR Pacific Caesar	Surabaya
Pelita Jaya Bakrie	GOR Soemantri Brodjonegoro	Jakarta
Prawira Bandung	C-Tra Arena	Bandung
RANS PIK	RANS Prestige Sportainment	Jakarta
Satria Muda Pertamina	The BritAma Arena	Jakarta
Satya Wacana Saints	GOR Sahabat	Salatiga
Tangerang Hawks	Indoor Stadium, Sports Center	Tangerang
West Bandits Combiphar	Sritex Arena	Solo

== Teams ==
League record of 16 teams competing throughout the season – 12 teams from last season and 4 new teams joined from the expansion process.

=== New teams ===
- Bumi Borneo Basketball Pontianak joined the league after being granted an IBL licence.
- Evos Thunder Bogor joined the league after EVOS issued and granted an IBL licence.
- RANS PIK Basketball Jakarta joined the league after RANS issued and granted an IBL licence.
- Tangerang Hawks joined the league after being granted an IBL licence.

=== Name changes ===
- Bima Perkasa Jogja would be known as DNA Bima Perkasa Jogja from this season after acquiring new sponsorship.
- West Bandits Solo would be known as West Bandits Combiphar Solo from this season after acquiring new sponsorship.
- Louvre Dewa United Surabaya would be known as Dewa United Surabaya from this season after Louvre pull-out from sponsorship and preparing another team in ASEAN Basketball League.

=== Personnel and Kits ===
Teams	Manager	Head Coach	Captain	Kit manufacturer
Amartha Hangtuah	(Indonesia) Leonardo Niki	(Indonesia) Antonius Ferry Rinaldo	(Indonesia) Gunawan	(Indonesia) Injers
Bali United Basketball	(Indonesia) Sugiantoro	(North Macedonia) Aleksandar Stefanovski	(Indonesia) Ponsianus Nyoman	(Indonesia) Made by club
Bumi Borneo	(Indonesia) Rendy Putrama	(Indonesia) Tondi R. Syailendra	(Indonesia) Arion Tio	(Indonesia) Urbain
DNA Bima Perkasa	(Indonesia) Fransisca Juniati	(Indonesia) Kartika Siti Aminah	(Indonesia) Azzaryan Pradhitya	(Indonesia) VNY
Dewa United Basketball	(Indonesia) Zaki Iskandar	(Argentina) Maximiliano Seigorman	(Indonesia) Kevin Moses Poetiray	(Indonesia) Mills
Evos Thunder	(Indonesia) Iwan Murryawan	(Indonesia) Andre Yuwadi	(Indonesia) Daniel Wenas	(Indonesia) Evosgoods
Indonesia Patriots	(Indonesia) Jamin Mattotoran	(Serbia) Miloš Pejić	(Indonesia) Ali Bagir Alhadar	(Indonesia) Nuraga
NSH Mountain Gold	(Indonesia) Yusuf Arlan Ruslim	(England) Antony Garbelotto	(Indonesia) Randika Aprilian	(Indonesia) Injers
Pacific Caesar	(Indonesia) Dean Julyanto	(Indonesia) R. Aries Herman	(Indonesia) Yonatan	(Indonesia) Terra
Pelita Jaya Bakrie	(Indonesia) Nugroho Budi Cahyono	(Indonesia) Fictor G. Roring	(Indonesia) Andakara Dhyaksa	(Indonesia) Nexterday
Prawira Bandung	(Indonesia) Andi S. Octaranes	(United States) David Singleton	(Indonesia) Diftha Pratama	(Indonesia) Sportama
RANS PIK Basketball	(Indonesia) Alvin Indra	(United States) Chris Daleo	(Indonesia) Bima Riski Ardiansyah	(Indonesia) AZA
Satria Muda Pertamina	(Indonesia) Riska Natalia Dewi	(Indonesia) Youbel Sondakh	(Indonesia) Arki Wisnu	(Indonesia) Juara
Satya Wacana Saints	(Indonesia) Martin Setyawan	(Indonesia) Jerry Lolowang	(Indonesia) Henry Cornelis Lakay	(Indonesia) A-Plus
Tangerang Hawks	(Indonesia) Indra Budianto	(Indonesia) Efri Meldi	(Indonesia) Rizky Effendi	(Indonesia) BFORE
West Bandits Combiphar	(Indonesia) Cesar W.H. Christian	(Indonesia) Raoul M. Hadinoto	(Indonesia) Widyanta Putra Teja	(Indonesia) AZA

== Drafts ==
=== Foreign players ===
Team	1st Pick	2nd Pick
Bali United	(United States) William Green III	(United States) Kendal Yancy
Bima Perkasa	(United States) David Atkinson	(United States) Jordan Jacks
Bumi Borneo	(United States) Austin Mofunanya	(United States) Randy Bell
Dewa United	(United States) David Seagers	(United States) Zoran Talley
Evos Thunder	(United States) Jaywuan Hill	(United States) Karamoko Cisse
Hangtuah	(United States) Anton Waters Sr.	(United States) Ronnie Boyce
NSH Mountain Gold	(United States) Mike Glover	(United States) Shavar Newkirk
Pacific Caesar	(United States) Akeem Ellis	(United States) Tyron Criswell
Pelita Jaya	(United States) Dior Lowhorn	(United States) Decardo Day
Prawira Bandung	(United States) Dennis Miles Jr	(United States) Kenneth Wormley
RANS PIK	(United States) Akeem Scott	(United States) Shane Heyward
Satria Muda	(United States) Elijah Foster	(United States) (Germany) Brachon Griffin
Satya Wacana Saints	(United States) Tyree Robinson	(United States) Joshua Davenport
Tangerang Hawks	(United States) Richard Ross Jr.	(United States) Jarron Crump
West Bandits	(United States) Sameen Swint	(United States) Bilal Richardson

=== Rookie ===
==== 1st round ====
Round	Pick	Name	Pos	Age	Height	Club
1	1	Mochammad Noval Mahadi	C	25	1.99 m	Hawks
1	2	Fathur Dzikri Shihab	SF	23	1.83 m	RANS
1	3	Rheza Saputra Butarbutar	PF	22	1.93 m	EVOS
1	4	Rillo Agum Kumara	SF	23	1.87 m	Bumi Borneo
1	5	Muhammad Aulaz Ariezky	SG	24	1.85 m	Pacific Caesar
1	6	Topo Adi Saputro	SG	22	1.82 m	Hangtuah
1	7	Maikel A.C. Baliba	SG	20	1.86 m	Saints
1	8	Melkias Mozo Kaize	unregistered			Mountain Gold
1	9	Anto Febryanto Boyratan	PF/C	19	1,96 m	West Bandits
1	10	Jason Christoufer Kurniawan	G	22	1.80 m	Bali United
1	11	Valentinus Michael Reinaldi	SG	22	1.82 m	Bima Perkasa
1	12	Bryan Fernando Korisano	PG	21	1.83 m	Dewa United
1	13	Maulana Iqbal Nugraha	unregistered			Prawira
1	14	Kresna Kurnia Aji	SG	25	1.77 m	Satria Muda
1	15	Qori Bilbalas	G	23	1.80 m	Pelita Jaya

==== 2nd round ====
Round	Pick	Name	Pos	Age	Height	Club
2	1	Putra Wijaya	SG	24	1.80 m	Hawks
2	2	PASS				RANS
2	3	Muhammad Yassier Rahmat	SF/PF	20	1.84 m	EVOS
2	4	Yanto	SG	23	1.78 m	Bumi Borneo
2	5	Christian Yudha	PF	24	1.85 m	Pacific Caesar
2	6	PASS				Hangtuah
2	7	PASS				Saints
2	8	PASS				Mountain Gold
2	9	PASS				West Bandits
2	10	PASS				Bali United
2	11	PASS				Bima Perkasa
2	12	PASS				Dewa United
2	13	PASS				Prawira
2	14	PASS				Satria Muda
2	15	PASS				Pelita Jaya

==== Recommended round ====
Round	Pick	Name	Pos	Age	Height	Club
RP	1	PASS				Hawks
RP	2	PASS				RANS
RP	3	PASS				EVOS
RP	4	PASS				Bumi Borneo
RP	5	Daffa Dhoifullah	PG	18	1.85 m	Pacific Caesar
RP	6	PASS				Hangtuah
RP	7	Naufal Narendra Ranggajaya	SF	18	1.96 m	Saints
RP	8	PASS				Mountain Gold
RP	9	Dandung O'Neal Pamungkas	PG	22	1.85 m	West Bandits
RP	10	A.A. Gede Agung Bagus P.	C	18	1.94 m	Bali United
RP	11	Ikram Fadhil	F	23	1.87 m	Bima Perkasa
RP	12	Ferdian Dwi Purwoko	PF	26	1.88 m	Dewa United
RP	13	Sulthan Muhammad Fauzan	SG	23	1.97 m	Prawira
RP	14	Ali Bagir	SF	21	1.93 m	Satria Muda
RP	15	Yesaya Saudale	G	21	1.78 m	Pelita Jaya
RP	Special	Muhamad Iqbal Hardianto	PF	19	1.80 m	Pacific Caesar
RP	Special	Bobby Gillian Wibisono	PF	23	1.95 m	Pacific Caesar
RP	Special	Nickson Damara Gosal	C/PF	21	1.94 m	West Bandits
RP	Special	Yosua O.S. Judaprajitna	PF/C	23	1.95 m	West Bandits
RP	Special	Neo Putu Pande	PF	20	1.96 m	Bali United
RP	Special	Muhammad Fhirdan Guntara	SF	23	1.97 m	Prawira
RP	Special	Renard Ichthus Hernando	C	19	2.06 m	Satria Muda
RP	Special	Fernando Fransco Manansang	G	19	1.85 m	Pelita Jaya
RP	Special	Hendrick Xavi Yonga	G	19	1.87 m	Pelita Jaya

== Regular season ==
=== Table ===
==== Red Division ====
Pos	Team	Pld	W	L	PF	PA	PD	Pts	Qualification
1	Satria Muda Pertamina	22	19	3	1621	1225	+396	41	Advance to Playoffs
2	West Bandits Combiphar	22	14	8	1619	1479	+140	36	Advance to Playoffs
3	Bumi Borneo Basketball	22	10	12	1501	1562	−61	32	
4	Pacific Caesar Surabaya	22	9	13	1459	1533	−74	31	
5	Indonesia Patriots	22	9	13	1256	1330	−74	31	
6	Tangerang Hawks	22	6	16	1291	1565	−274	28	
7	Satya Wacana Saints	22	5	17	1445	1586	−141	27	
8	DNA Bima Perkasa	22	3	19	1247	1550	−303	25	

Updated to match(es) played on 30 March 2022. Source: IBL Indonesia

==== White Division ====
Pos	Team	Pld	W	L	PF	PA	PD	Pts	Qualification
1	Pelita Jaya Bakrie	22	20	2	1611	1405	+206	42	Advance to Playoffs
2	Prawira Bandung	22	18	4	1568	1239	+329	40	Advance to Playoffs
3	NSH Mountain Gold	22	14	8	1443	1395	+48	36	Advance to Playoffs
4	Dewa United Basketball	22	13	9	1526	1529	−3	35	Advance to Playoffs
5	Amartha Hangtuah	22	12	10	1505	1474	+31	34	Advance to Playoffs
6	RANS PIK Basketball	22	11	11	1398	1391	+7	33	Advance to Playoffs
7	Bali United Basketball	22	8	14	1367	1432	−65	30	
8	Evos Thunder	22	5	17	1210	1372	−162	27	

Updated to match(es) played on 30 March 2022. Source: IBL Indonesia

==== Final standings ====
Pos	Team	Pld	W	L	PF	PA	PD	Pts	Qualification
1	Pelita Jaya Bakrie	22	20	2	1611	1405	+206	42	Advance to Playoffs
2	Satria Muda Pertamina	22	19	3	1621	1225	+396	41	Advance to Playoffs
3	Prawira Bandung	22	18	4	1568	1239	+329	40	Advance to Playoffs
4	NSH Mountain Gold	22	14	8	1443	1395	+48	36	Advance to Playoffs
5	West Bandits Combiphar	22	14	8	1619	1479	+140	36	Advance to Playoffs
6	Dewa United Basketball	22	13	9	1526	1529	−3	35	Advance to Playoffs
7	Amartha Hangtuah	22	12	10	1505	1474	+31	34	Advance to Playoffs
8	RANS PIK Basketball	22	11	11	1398	1391	+7	33	Advance to Playoffs
9	Bumi Borneo Basketball	22	10	12	1501	1562	−61	32	
10	Indonesia Patriots	22	9	13	1256	1330	−74	31	
11	Pacific Caesar Surabaya	22	9	13	1459	1533	−74	31	
12	Bali United Basketball	22	8	14	1367	1432	−65	30	
13	Tangerang Hawks	22	6	16	1291	1565	−274	28	
14	Satya Wacana Saints	22	5	17	1445	1586	−141	27	
15	Evos Thunder	22	5	17	1210	1372	−162	27	
16	DNA Bima Perkasa	22	3	19	1247	1550	−303	25	

Updated to match(es) played on 30 March 2022. Source: IBL Indonesia

=== Results ===
Home \ Away	AHT	BBC	BBB	DBC	BPJ	ETB	INA	NMG	PCC	PJB	PWR	RNS	SMP	SWS	TGH	WBS
Amartha Hangtuah	—	65–57		68–66	68–53	46–51		74–63	71–75	64–79	65–69	65–53	67–85		76–64	
Bali United	54–53	—	70–71	61–66	69–50	56–38		55–78		66–90	48–64	62–70			68–70	76–74
Bumi Borneo	91–103		—	78–83	76–66	65–61	51–43		80–61	62–81	61–69	65–70	63–74	88–78	75–53	84–71
Dewa United	78–75	61–57		—		64–62	71–44	63–80		64–81	68–77	78–74	60–55	66–64		73–93
DNA Bima Perkasa			76–61	72–73	—	32–51	54–70	59–71	56–63	66–83	53–75		40–83	51–63	62–67	59–64
Evos Thunder	50–53	65–58		72–68		—	53–58	53–67	70–64	64–68	36–78	43–74		54–69		
Indonesia Patriots	58–60	55–62	65–70		60–37		—		68–66			48–64	47–46	66–53	77–59	75–77
NSH Mountain Gold	68–59	67–82	68–60	66–65		84–61	74–49	—	68–63	62–76	36–70	64–61		80–69	78–37	
Pacific Caesar		54–70	77–42	66–74	67–64		57–61		—	66–90	54–71	78–75	64–81	74–67	79–55	69–83
Pelita Jaya Bakrie	74–69	78–53		70–64		69–63	63–49	55–52		—	49–69	72–67	69–65			87–81
Prawira	82–83	70–38		77–59		59–46	74–51	69–56		71–61	—	55–66	66–68	89–50	77–44	57–77
RANS PIK	66–64	70–68		69–92	53–57	57–49		58–46		60–68	70–80	—	32–64	69–51		
Satria Muda Pertamina		57–54	92–67		89–50	57–54	59–45	90–46	82–49				—	77–58	88–55	69–61
Satya Wacana Saints	68–75	66–81	72–81		92–68		64–74		55–57	70–77			60–78	—	66–62	66–83
Tangerang Hawks			61–54	68–70	61–79	53–50	52–43		73–87	56–61		47–63	64–82	72–71	—	58–77
West Bandits Combiphar	70–82		68–59		91–43	73–64	64–50	67–69	77–69			75–57	54–80	64–73	75–60	—

Updated to match(es) played on March 30, 2022. Source: IBL Indonesia
Legend: Blue = home team win; Red = away team win.

== Playoffs ==
=== Bracket ===
First round
1	Pelita Jaya Bakrie	74	58	93
8	RANS PIK Basketball	66	65	86
4	NSH Mountain Gold	57	70	71
5	West Bandits Combiphar	66	47	83
2	Satria Muda Pertamina	88	82
7	Amartha Hangtuah	86	75
3	Prawira Bandung	78	84	69
6	Dewa United Basketball	74	89	65

Semifinals
1	Pelita Jaya Bakrie	80	86
5	West Bandits Combiphar	71	71
2	Satria Muda Pertamina	85	73
3	Prawira Bandung	77	54

Final
1	Pelita Jaya Bakrie	87	74
2	Satria Muda Pertamina	95	89

== Statistics ==
=== Individual game highs ===
Name	Club	Category	Statistic
(United States) Randy Bell	Bumi Borneo Pontianak	Point	40
(United States) Shavar Newkirk	NSH Mountain Gold	Assist	12
(United States) Elijah Foster	Satria Muda Pertamina	Rebounds	25
(United States) Tyree Robinson	Satya Wacana Saints	Steals	5
(United States) Tyree Robinson	Satya Wacana Saints	Blocks	9

=== Individual statistic ===
Point Per Games
Name	Club	PPG
(United States) Shavar Newkirk	NSH Mountain Gold	21.86
(United States) Tyree Robinson	Satya Wacana Saints	21.47
(United States) Randy Bell	Bumi Borneo Pontianak	18.59
(United States) Dior Lowhorn	Pelita Jaya Bakrie	18.05
(United States) Sameen Swint	West Bandits Combiphar	17.83

Assists Per Games
Name	Club	APG
(Indonesia) Yesaya Saudale	Pelita Jaya Bakrie	7.18
(United States) Shavar Newkirk	NSH Mountain Gold	4.81
(Indonesia) Yudha Saputera	Prawira Bandung	4.55
(Indonesia) Abraham Wenas	Bali United Basketball	4.33
(Indonesia) Arki Wisnu	Satria Muda Pertamina	3.95

Rebounds Per Games
Name	Club	RPG
(United States) Elijah Foster	Satria Muda Pertamina	11.88
(United States) Taj Spencer	Prawira Bandung	11.41
(Indonesia) Dame Diagne	Indonesia Patriots	11.05
(United States) Jordan Jacks	DNA Bima Perkasa	10.17
(United States) Tyree Robinson	Satya Wacana Saints	9.58

Steals Per Games
Name	Club	SPG
(United States) Tyree Robinson	Satya Wacana Saints	2.42
(United States) Akeem Scott	RANS PIK	2.33
(United States) Shavar Newkirk	NSH Mountain Gold	2.24
(United States) Jordan Jacks	DNA Bima Perkasa	2.08
(Indonesia) Yesaya Saudale	Pelita Jaya Bakrie	1.91

Blocks Per Games
Name	Club	BPG
(Indonesia) Kelvin Sanjaya	Indonesia Patriots	2.00
(United States) Tyree Robinson	Satya Wacana Saints	1.63
(United States) William Green III	Bali United Basketball	1.45
(Indonesia) Randy Prasetya	Satya Wacana Saints	1.45
(Indonesia) Ruslan Ruslan	NSH Mountain Gold	1.36

== Individual awards ==
Most Valuable Player : Abraham Damar Grahita, (Prawira Bandung)

Foreign Player of the Year : Shavar Newkirk, (NSH Mountain Gold Timika)

Rookie of the Year : Yudha Saputera, (Prawira Bandung)

Coach of the Year : David Singleton, (Prawira Bandung)

Defensive Player of the Year : Ruslan, (NSH Mountain Gold Timika)

Sixthman of the Year : Rio Disi, (West Bandits Combiphar Solo)

Most Improve Player of the Year : Hengki Infandi, (NSH Mountain Gold Timika)

Best Referee of the Year : Budi Marfan

2022 All-Indonesian First Team

1. G: Abraham Damar Grahita (Prawira Bandung)
2. G: Yudha Saputera (Prawira Bandung)
3. F: Kaleb Ramot Gemilang (Dewa United Basketball)
4. F: Muhammad Reza Guntara (Prawira Bandung)
5. C: Vincent Rivaldi Kosasih (Pelita Jaya Bakrie)

2022 All-Indonesian Second Team

1. G: Widyanta Putra Teja (West Bandits Combiphar Solo)
2. G: Andakara Prastawa (Pelita Jaya Bakrie)
3. F: Fisyaiful Amir (RJ Amartha Hangtuah)
4. F: Arki Dikania Wisnu (Satria Muda Pertamina)
5. C: Ruslan (NSH Mountain Gold Timika)

2022 All-Indonesian Defensive Team

1. C: Ruslan (NSH Mountain Gold Timika)
2. C: Vincent Rivaldi Kosasih (Pelita Jaya Bakrie)
3. F: Fisyaiful Amir (RJ Amartha Hangtuah)
4. G: Abraham Damar Grahita (Prawira Bandung)
5. G: Sandy Ibrahim Aziz (Satria Muda Pertamina)

== All-Star Games ==
=== Pre-game ===
Skill-challenge champion : (Indonesia) Team Ferdian: Ferdian Purwoko, Riko Hartono, Nina Yunita

Three-point contest champion : (Indonesia) Indra Muhammad (DNA Bima Perkasa)

=== Half game ===
Slam-dunk contest champion : (United States) (Indonesia) Jarron Crump (Tangerang Hawks)

=== Game ===
==== White Division ====
Pos	Name	Club
Starters
G	(United States) Shavar Newkirk	NSH Mountain Gold
G	(Indonesia) Abraham Grahita	Prawira Bandung
G	(Indonesia) Yudha Saputera	Prawira Bandung
F	(Indonesia) Kaleb Gemilang	Dewa United Banten
C	(Indonesia) Vincent Kosasih	Pelita Jaya Bakrie
Reserves
G	(Indonesia) Stevan Neno	Amartha Hangtuah
F	(Indonesia) Bima Riski Ardiansyah	Rans PIK
F	(Indonesia) Fisyaiful Amir	Amartha Hangtuah
F	(Indonesia) Muhammad Reza Guntara	Prawira Bandung
F	(Indonesia) Rico Aditya	Bali United Basketball
C	(Indonesia) Ruslan	NSH Mountain Gold
C	(United States) Taj Spencer	Prawira Bandung
Coach
	(United States) David Singleton	Prawira Bandung

==== Red Division ====
Pos	Name	Club
Starters
G	(Indonesia) Rio Disi	West Bandits Combiphar
G	(Indonesia) Widyanta Putra Teja	West Bandits Combiphar
F	(Indonesia) Arki Wisnu	Satria Muda Pertamina
F	(Indonesia) Ali Bagir	Indonesia Patriots
C	(United States) Tyree Robinson	Satya Wacana Saints
Reserves
G	(Indonesia) Hardianus Lakudu	Satria Muda Pertamina
G	(Indonesia) Sandy Ibrahim Aziz	Satria Muda Pertamina
G	(United States) Randy Bell	Bumi Borneo Pontianak
F	(Indonesia) Dame Diagne	Indonesia Patriots
F	(Indonesia) Patrick Nikolas	West Bandits Combiphar
C	(Indonesia) Yonatan Kae	Pacific Caesar Surabaya
C	(Indonesia) Kelvin Sanjaya	Indonesia Patriots
Coach
	(Indonesia) Youbel Sondakh	Satria Muda Pertamina

31 March 2022
19:20 pm WIB

White Division 102, Red Division 100
Scoring by quarter: 31-24, 34-30, 19–26, 18–20

Hall A Senayan, Jakarta
Attendance: 2.000

==== Most Valuable Player ====
Country	Name	Team
(United States)	Shavar Newkirk	NSH Mountain Gold

==== Local Best Performer ====
Country	Name	Team
(Indonesia)	Abraham Grahita	Prawira Bandung

== Finals ==
=== Finals MVP ===
MVP	Team
(United States) (Germany) Brachon Griffin	Satria Muda Pertamina
