= Max Yanto =

Indonesian basketball player (born 1983)

Hangtuah Jakarta
- Position: Center

Personal information
- Born: 7 July 1983 (age 43) Lampung, Indonesia
- Listed height: 212 cm (6 ft 11 in)
- Listed weight: 105 kg (231 lb)

Career information
- Playing career: 2010–present

Career history
- 2010-2011: Hangtuah Sumsel
- 2011-2014: NSH Jakarta
- 2014-2015: Stadium Jakarta
- 2015-present: Muba Hangtuah/Hangtuah Jakarta

Career highlights
- 2× NBL Indonesia Sportmanship Award (2012, 2013)

Max Yanto (born 7 July 1983) is an Indonesian professional basketball player who plays for Hangtuah Jakarta of the Indonesian Basketball League (IBL). He is the second tallest Indonesian to play in the IBL behind Ujang Warlika who stands in 2.24 m (7 ft 4 in).

== Statistics ==
Year/Seasons	League	Club	GP	RPG	APG	SPG	BPG	PPG
10-11	NBL Indonesia	HTS	8	4.1	0.2	0.3	0.2	3.5
11-12	NBL Indonesia	NSH	28	7.1	0.2	0.4	0.5	7.3
12–13	NBL Indonesia	NSH	33	4.9	0.3	0.3	0.2	9.1
13-14	NBL Indonesia	NSH	23	4	0.2	0.3	0.1	7
14-15	NBL Indonesia	STD	7	0.4	0	0.1	0	1.4
2016	IBL	HTS	14	2.7	0.2	0.1	0.07	2.7
