= Muhammad Rizal Falconi =

Indonesian basketball player (born 1993)

Rizal Falconi
No. 77 – Hangtuah Jakarta
- Position: Center / power forward
- League: IBL

Personal information
- Born: 7 July 1993 (age 33) Sanggau, Indonesia
- Listed height: 198 cm (6 ft 6 in)
- Listed weight: 78 kg (172 lb)

Career information
- High school: SMAN 7 (Pontianak, Indonesia)
- College: Perbanas Institute
- Playing career: 2010–present

Career history
- 2010-2017: Garuda Bandung
- 2017-2022: Satria Muda Pertamina
- 2022-2023: West Bandits Solo
- 2023-2024: Prawira Bandung
- 2024-2025: Borneo Hornbills
- 2025-present: Hangtuah Jakarta

Career highlights
- 3× IBL champion (2018, 2021, 2022)
Medals
Men's basketball
Representing Indonesia
ASEAN University Games
Gold medal – first place	2016 Singapore	Team

Muhammad Rizal Falconi (born 7 July 1993) is an Indonesian professional basketball player for Hangtuah Jakarta of the Indonesian Basketball League (IBL). He has helped Satria Muda win 3 championships in his 5 seasons playing for them.

== High school career ==
At SMAN 7, Falconi was selected as a DBL All-Star in 2010 that was held at Seattle, Washington.

== Personal life ==
Falconi is a fan of Michael Jordan.
