= Ali Bagir =

Indonesian basketball player

Satria Muda Bandung
- Position: Power forward / small forward
- League: IBL

Personal information
- Born: July 4, 2000 (age 26) Jakarta, Indonesia
- Listed height: 195 cm (6 ft 5 in)
- Listed weight: 80 kg (176 lb)

Career information
- High school: SMAN 46 (Jakarta, Indonesia)
- College: University of Indonesia
- Playing career: 2020–present

Career history
- 2020-2022: Indonesia Patriots
- 2022-2025: Satria Muda Pertamina
- 2025-2026: Shinagawa City
- 2026–present: Satria Muda Bandung

Career highlights
- All-IBL Indonesian Second Team (2025); 3× IBL All-Star (2023-2025); All-IBL Rookie Team (2021)

Ali Bagir Wayarabi Alhadar (born 4 July 2000) is an Indonesian professional basketball player who plays for Satria Muda Bandung of the Indonesian Basketball League (IBL).

Joining Shinagawa City on 26 September 2025, Bagir was the third Indonesian to play in the B.League (after Abraham Damar Grahita and Brandon Jawato)

== Personal life ==
Bagir is the grandson of Hadi A. Wayarabi Alhadar, a former Indonesian ambassador to Bangladesh and then Malaysia. He is of a Yemeni descent.

Ali Bagir has been playing basketball since high school at SMA Negeri 46 Jakarta. In 2018, he entered the University of Indonesia, where he majored in Computer Science.

== National team career ==
Bagir has represented the Indonesia men's national basketball team in the 2025 FIBA Asia Cup qualification and the 2023 Asian Games.
