= Widyanta Putra Teja =

Indonesian basketball player

No. 71 – Bogor Hornbills
- Position: Point guard
- League: IBL

Personal information
- Born: 13 April 1997 (age 29) Surabaya, Indonesia
- Listed height: 180 cm (5 ft 11 in)
- Listed weight: 73 kg (161 lb)

Career information
- High school: Intan Permata Hati (Surabaya, Indonesia)
- Playing career: 2016–present

Career history
- 2016-2019: Stapac Jakarta
- 2019-2020: NSH Jakarta
- 2020-2022: West Bandits Solo
- 2022-2026: Satria Muda Pertamina
- 2026-present: Bogor Hornbills

Career highlights
- IBL champion (2019); 2× IBL All-Star (2023, 2022); IBL All Indonesian Cup champion (2025); 2× All-IBL Indonesian Second Team (2022, 2020); All-IBL Indonesian Defensive Second Team (2021); IBL Most Improved Player of the Year (2019)

Widyanta Putra Teja (born April 13, 1997) often nicknamed Widy or Speedy Widy, is an Indonesian professional basketball player for the Bogor Hornbills of the Indonesian Basketball League (IBL).

== National team career ==
Widy represented the Indonesia's national basketball team on several occasions, including the 2022 FIBA Asia Cup; 2023 SEA Games; 2022 Asian Games in Hangzhou, China; and, more recently, in the 2025 FIBA Asia Cup qualification.
