= Julian Chalias =

Indonesian basketball player

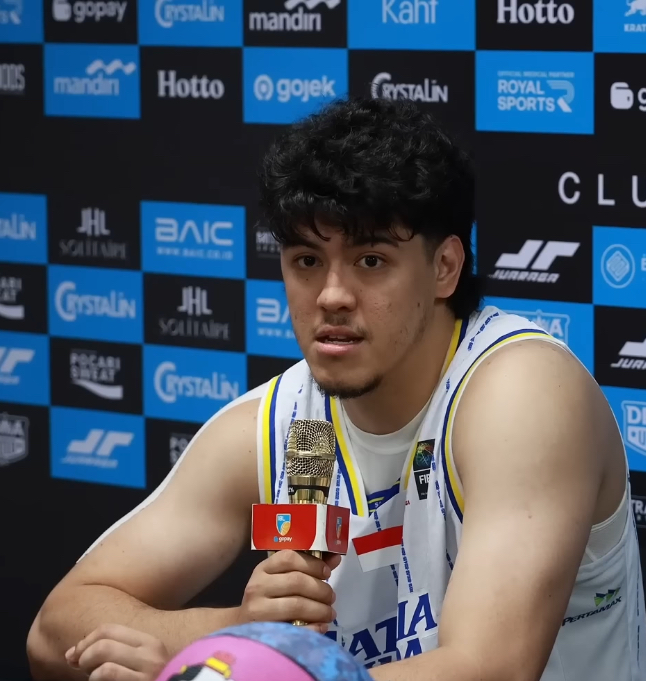
- Chalias with Satria Muda Bandung in 2026

No. 14 – Satria Muda Bandung
- Position: Power forward
- League: IBL

Personal information
- Born: 12 August 2002 (age 24) Denpasar, Indonesia
- Listed height: 201 cm (6 ft 7 in)
- Listed weight: 85 kg (187 lb)

Career information
- High school: SMA Soverdi Tuban (Kuta, Indonesia); Françoise Combes (Montpellier, France)
- Playing career: 2022–present

Career history
- 2022-2023: Indonesia Patriots
- 2023-present: Satria Muda Pertamina

Career highlights
- 4× IBL All-Star (2023-2026); IBL All Indonesian Cup champion (2025)
Medals
Men's basketball
Representing Indonesia
Southeast Asian Games
Bronze medal – third place	2025 Thailand	Team

Julian Alexandre Chalias (born August 12, 2002) is an Indonesian professional basketball player for the Satria Muda Pertamina of the Indonesian Basketball League (IBL).

== High school career ==
At Soverdi Tuban, Chalias was selected as a DBL All-Star in 2019 and 2018 where he was sent to California. After graduating, he was contracted by Croix d’Argent Basket Montpellier U-20 in 2020.

== Personal life ==
Chalias family is originally from France, his grandmother Anne-Marie Chalias played for France women's national team in the 1960s. Chalias is the older brother of Adrien Chalias, where they are both currently playing for Satria Muda Pertamina.

== National team career ==
Chalias has represented Indonesia men's national basketball team at several competitions, such as in the 2022 FIBA 3x3 Asia Cup in Singapore, and then competitions such as 2023 SEA Games and most recently represented Indonesia in the 2025 FIBA Asia Cup qualification.
