= Sandy Ibrahim =

Indonesian basketball player (born 1996)

No. 8 – Satria Muda Bandung
- Position: Shooting guard
- League: IBL

Personal information
- Born: 3 July 1996 (age 30) Bandung, Indonesia
- Listed height: 188 cm (6 ft 2 in)
- Listed weight: 79 kg (174 lb)

Career information
- High school: SMA PSKD 1 (Jakarta, Indonesia)
- College: Perbanas Institute
- Playing career: 2015–present

Career history
- 2015-present: Satria Muda Pertamina

Career highlights
- 3x IBL champions (2018, 2021, 2022); 2x IBL All-Star (2022, 2023, 2026); IBL All Indonesian Cup champion (2025); 2x All-IBL Indonesian Defensive Team (2022, 2021); IBL Most Improved Player of the Year (2020); All-IBL Indonesian Second Team (2020)

Muhammad Sandy Ibrahim Aziz (born July 3, 1996) is an Indonesian professional basketball for the Satria Muda Pertamina of the Indonesian Basketball League (IBL). He is known for his two handed slam dunks.

== Personal life ==
Ibrahim's mother was a professional volleyball athlete from 1989 until 2006.
