= Shavar Newkirk =

American basketball player

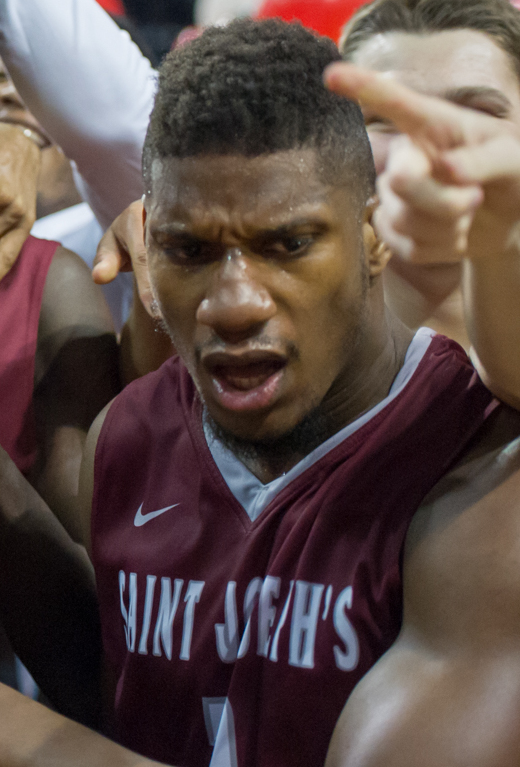
- Newkirk in 2022

Free agent
- Position: Point guard

Personal information
- Born: May 6, 1996 (age 30) Bronx, New York, U.S.
- Listed height: 183 cm (6 ft 0 in)
- Listed weight: 79 kg (174 lb)

Career information
- High school: Rice (Manhattan, New York); Cardinal Hayes (Bronx, New York)
- College: Saint Joseph's (2014–2018)
- NBA draft: 2018: undrafted
- Playing career: 2018–present

Career history
- 2018: Halifax Hurricanes
- 2018–2020: FC Schalke 04 Basketball
- 2020: Höttur
- 2022-2023: NSH Mountain Gold Timika
- 2023: SK Slavia Praha

Career highlights
- IBL All-Star MVP (2022); IBL All-Star (2022); IBL Foreign Player of the Year (2022); Second-team All-Atlantic 10 (2018)

Shavar Tahrel Newkirk (born May 6, 1996) is an American professional basketball player who last played for SK Slavia Praha of the National Basketball League. He played college basketball for Saint Joseph's Hawks.

== Early life ==
Newkirk is the son of Sharied Newkirk and grew up in Harlem. He began playing basketball at the age of five and immediately began to love the game. He attended Cardinal Hayes High School after transferring from Rice High School. As a senior at Cardinal Hayes, Newkirk averaged 18.7 points per game and led the team to back-to-back CHSAA intersectional semifinals appearances. He was named New York Daily News Bronx player of the year in 2014.

== College career ==
Newkirk averaged 8 points per game as a sophomore at Saint Joseph's. He was the starting point guard on a team led by star DeAndre' Bembry that won the Atlantic 10 Conference and reached the 2016 NCAA Tournament. As a junior, Newkirk averaged a team-high 20.3 points per game in the first 12 games. However, he was lost for the season due to a torn anterior cruciate ligament he suffered during a 69–63 victory over George Washington. Newkirk averaged 17.4 points, 4.3 rebounds and 3.9 assists per game as a senior. He was named to the Second-team All-Atlantic 10 and All-Big 5 Team. He graduated from Saint Joseph's with a degree in sports marketing.

== Professional career ==
In August 2018 Newkirk signed his first professional contract with the Halifax Hurricanes of the National Basketball League of Canada. He was cit on October 30. On December 25, 2018, Newkirk signed with FC Schalke 04 Basketball of the German ProA league. In August 2020 Newkirk signed with Höttur which was promoted to the Icelandic Premier League after being on top in the Men's 1. Division when the season was cut short due to the COVID-19 outbreak. In November 2020, the club released Newkirk after the league had been stopped for a month due to a new COVID-19 outbreak in Iceland. In January 2022, Newkirk signed with NSH Mountain Gold Timika of the Indonesian Basketball League. Shavar Newkirk averaged 21.9 PPG, 9 rebounds, 4,8 assists, and 2.2 steals in the 2022 IBL Season. Eventually, Shavar would then win the Best Foreign Player award for the 2022 IBL Season.
