= Hans Abraham =

Indonesian basketball player

Hangtuah Jakarta
- Position: Point guard
- League: IBL

Personal information
- Born: 24 February 1995 (age 31) Bandung, Indonesia
- Listed height: 180 cm (5 ft 11 in)
- Listed weight: 73 kg (161 lb)

Career information
- High school: SMA PSKD 1 (Jakarta, Indonesia)
- College: UPH
- Playing career: 2015–present

Career history
- 2015-2016: Satria Muda BritAma
- 2016-2017: CLS Knights
- 2017-2024: Prawira Bandung
- 2024-2026: Borneo Hornbills / Bogor Hornbills
- 2026-present: Hangtuah Jakarta

Career highlights
- 2× IBL champion (2023, 2026); 2× IBL Sixth Man of the Year (2023, 2024); LIMA champion (2015)
Medals
Men's basketball
Representing Indonesia
SEABA Under-18 Championship
Silver medal – second place	2012 Singapore	Team

Hans Abraham (born February 24, 1995) is an Indonesian professional basketball player who plays for the Hangtuah Jakarta of the Indonesian Basketball League (IBL). Prior to the Prawira Bandung, Abraham played for the CLS Knights and Satria Muda BritAma, and played college basketball for the UPH Eagles.

== High school ==
At SMA 1 PSKD, Jakarta he was selected for the DBL All-Star team in 2012.

== National team career ==
Abraham was a member of Indonesia men's national under-16 basketball team at the 2011 FIBA Asia Under-16 Championship in Nha Trang, Vietnam.

== Personal life ==
Abraham got married at the InterContinental Bandung on October 1st, 2022, to Elviena Mutiara.
