= Johannis Winar =

Indonesian basketball coach and former player

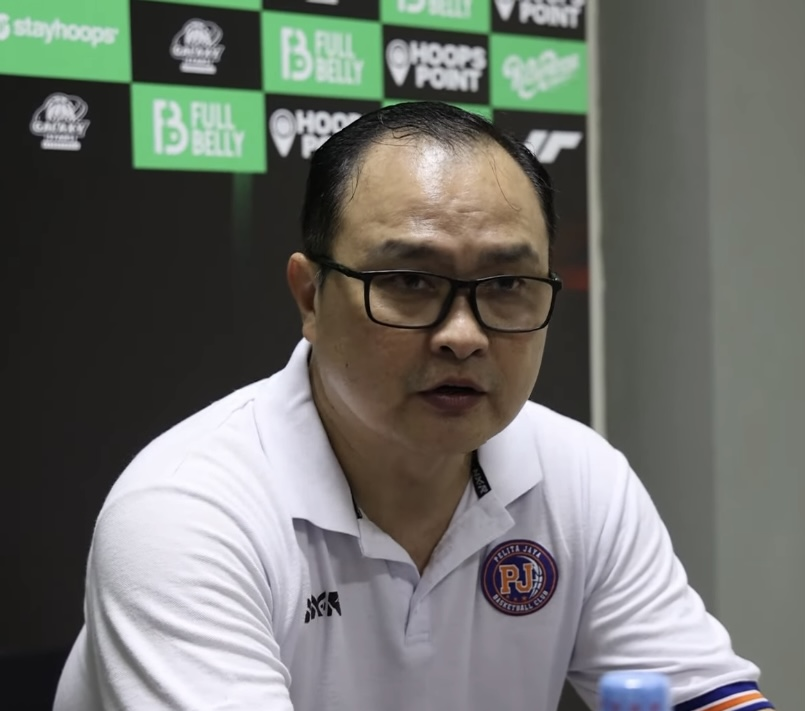
- Winar in 2024

Pelita Jaya
- Title: Assistant coach
- League: IBL

Personal information
- Born: December 24, 1970 (age 55) Makassar, Indonesia
- Listed height: 5 ft 11 in (1.80 m)

Career information
- High school: Catholic Cenderawasih (Makassar, Indonesia)
- Playing career: 1989–2004
- Position: Guard
- Number: 23
- Coaching career: 2006–present

Career history

Playing
- 1989–1993: Bandar Utama BC
- 1993–1996: Daya Sakti
- 1996–2003: Panasia Indosyntec
- 2003–2004: Satria Muda

Coaching
- 2006–2009: Garuda Bandung (assistant)
- 2009: Amartha Hangtuah
- 2009: Stadium Jakarta (assistant)
- 2010–2013: Garuda Bandung
- 2013–present: Pelita Jaya (assistant)
- 2017–2019: Pelita Jaya
- 2019–2024: Indonesia Patriots (assistant)
- 2024–2025: Pelita Jaya

Career highlights
- As player: IBL Skill-challenge champion (2023); 3× IBL champion (1997, 1998, 2004); 2× South Sulawesi select team at the National Sports Week (1988, 1989); top scorer National Sports Week (1988); South Kalimantan select team at the National Sports Week (1993); As head coach: 2× IBL champion (2017, 2024); IBL All-Star Game head coach (2024); DKI Governor's Cup champion (2010); IBL champion (2017)
Medals
Representing Indonesia
Southeast Asian Games
Bronze medal – third place	1999 Brunei	National team

Johannis "Ahang" Winar (born 24 December 1970) is an Indonesian basketball coach and former player. He is currently serving as assistant coach of Pelita Jaya Bakrie of the Indonesian Basketball League (IBL) and the Indonesia national team.

Anhang is a five-time IBL champion, three times as a player and twice as head coach. He further holds several PERBASI Cup titles.

== Playing career ==
=== Regional select teams and club career ===
Ahang was selected to join the South Sulawesi team for the 1988 National Championship (Kejurnas) in Semarang where he was top scorer. His performance led to his first professional contract.

Ahang also became the mainstay of his regional team towards the 1989 National Sports Week in Jakarta. His talent attracted the Kobatama club from Banjarmasin at that time, Bandar Utama. There, he started in the second team.

Unfortunately for Anhang, in 1993, Banjar Utama which was owned by Pak Budi Surya disbanded but Anhang stayed in Banjarmasin.

At the 1993 National Sports Week in Jakarta he played for South Kalimantan. His next team was Daya Sakti. Then, Ahang received an offer from the Kobatama club Panasia Indosyntec. In his first year 1996, Panasia finished as runner-up. The following two seasons, they won the title.

Ahang was with Panasia until 2003. He then moved to Satria Muda Jakarta where he won the 2004 IBL title.

=== National team ===
In 1997, Ahang was also included in the Indonesian national team for the 1997 SEA Games in Jakarta, but failed to get a medal. Two years later, Ahang returned to the national team and won the bronze medal at the Brunei 1999 SEA Games.

== Coaching career ==
In 2006 he returned to Bandung, at that time Panasia had changed its name to Garuda Bandung. There he became assistant coach to Kak Amran.

In 2009, Ahang became head coach at Amartha Hangtuah in South Sumatra for the first time, but only for half a season. He later became assistant coach of Stadium Jakarta.

In 2010, he was entrusted with controlling Garuda Bandung. Garuda managed to win the DKI Governor's Cup tournament, and finished 4th place in the regular round.

In 2013 he moved to Pelita Jaya, became an assistant coach for Nath Canson then accompanied Antonius F. Rinaldo until he was finally appointed as head coach of Pelita Jaya and successfully led his team to become IBL 2017 champions.

He led Pelita Jaya to the 2017 IBL Indonesia championship where his team defeated Satria Muda Pertamina 3–1 in the final. This accomplishment was noteworthy as some of the team's best players had recently departed. These players included Andy Batam, Dimas Aryo Dewanto, and Kelly Purwanto.

As an executive, Anhang has stressed the need for a competition level below the IBL. “Players from the Student League still need more flight hours before competing in the IBL. For that, a national competition under the IBL is needed to mature them,” he suggested in December 2017.

In 2019, Winar quit his coaching position as head coach of Pelita Jaya and was replaced by Octaviarro Romely Tamlahitu. Winar became assistant coach of Indonesia's national team, also nicknamed the Indonesian Patriots.

In March 2024, Winar replaced Rob Beveridge as head coach of Pelita Jaya. Winar was released in April 2025 in favour of Justin Tatum.

== Personal ==
His nickname is Ahang. Anhang's mother, father and uncle were all basketball players. His father Hendy Winar and his uncle Arlan Winarso were even national team players. Hendy Winar has also been head coach of Flying Wheel Makassar, a team in Indonesia's first division for women.

Anhang started basketball while in elementary school. Later, he went to Cenderawasih Catholic High School which is especially known for its basketball and volleyball teams.

He married Joan Suryana, a player for the Indonesian women's national team.
