= Fictor Gideon Roring =

Fictor Roring
Pelita Jaya
- Title: Club commissioner
- League: IBL

Personal information
- Born: 18 December 1972 (age 53) Manado, Indonesia
- Listed height: 1.94 m (6 ft 4 in)

Career information
- High school: SMAN 7 (Manado, Indonesia)
- College: Perbanas Institute
- Playing career: 1989–2001
- Position: Center
- Number: 18
- Coaching career: 2004–present

Career history

Playing
- 1989–1995: Kalila
- 1995–1999: Aspac Jakarta
- 1999–2001: Satria Muda BritAma

Coaching
- 2004–2007: Satria Muda BritAma
- 2015–2016: Garuda Bandung
- 2007, 2015, 2017: Indonesia

Career highlights
- As head coach: 3× IBL champion (2004, 2005, 2007); As general manager: IBL champion (2017); IBL Indonesia Cup champion (2022); IBL Perbasi Cup (2017); As club commissioner: IBL champion (2024)
Medals
Men's basketball
Representing Indonesia
Southeast Asian Games
Silver medal – second place	2015 Singapore	Team

Fictor Gideon Roring (born 18 December 1972) is an Indonesian basketball coach and former player. He served as the general manager from 2017 till 2024, and is currently the club commissioner for Pelita Jaya Bakrie of the Indonesian Basketball League (IBL).

== Personal life and career ==
The fourth child of five siblings, he graduated from Negeri 03 Jakarta of High School and became a professional basketball player, playing for league clubs such as Pelita Jaya, Aspac Jakarta and Satria Muda as well as the Indonesian national side. When he retired from playing in 2001, he was appointed as coach of Perbanas and then Satria Muda before coaching the Indonesia national basketball team in the 2007 SEA Games in Nakhon Ratchasima, Thailand. Following this, he established a basketball academy. In 2015, he returned as coach of the Indonesia national team, taking home silver from the 2015 SEA Games in Singapore. Later in 2015, he signed to be head coach of Garuda Bandung in the IBL league. He is the father of two children.

== Career Head Coach ==
After retiring as a basketball player in 2001, he decided to become a coach.

=== Satria Muda BritAma ===
Satria Muda is the first team he trained and under his leadership they won the IBL league title in 2004, 2005, and 2007.

=== Garuda Bandung ===
After training the Indonesian national team, he signed a contract in 2015 to coach Garuda Bandung.

==== Statistic ====
Seasons	W	L	Pos	Play-off	W	L	Pre-Season	W	L
2015-16	22	11	4th	First Round	0	2	3rd in Group A	1	2

=== Indonesia Men's Basketball Team ===
In 2007, he first coached the Indonesia national basketball team in the Indonesia SEA Games. He was appointed national team coach for the Indonesia SEA Games in 2015. He also coached in the arena SEABA Championship in Singapore.

Season	W	L	Pos
2015	5	5	Silver Medal in SEA Games 4th Place in SEABA Championship
2017	0	0	
2018	9	4	Gold Medal Pre-Event Asian Games Gold Medal 2021 FIBA Asia Cup Pre-Qualification
Totals	14	9	
