= Youbel Sondakh =

Indonesian basketball coach and former player

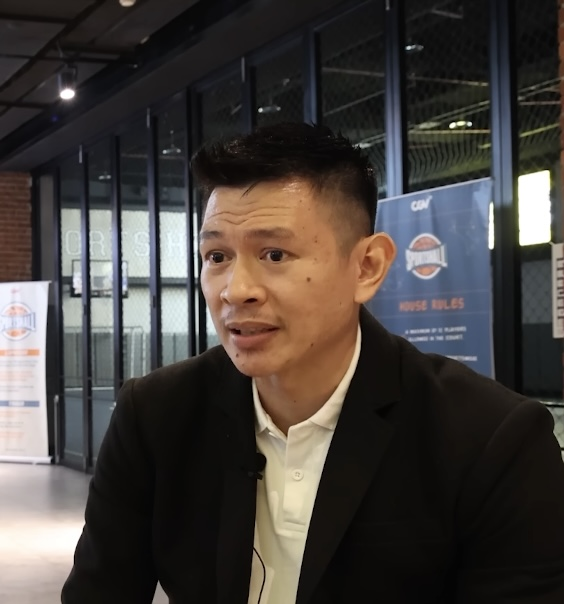
- Sondakh in 2023

Satria Muda Bandung
- Title: Sporting director
- League: IBL

Personal information
- Born: 19 August 1983 (age 43) Manado, Indonesia
- Listed height: 190 cm (6 ft 3 in)
- Listed weight: 83 kg (183 lb)

Career information
- College: Perbanas Institute
- NBA draft: 2006: undrafted
- Playing career: 2002–2012
- Position: Shooting guard / small forward
- Coaching career: 2012–present

Career history

Playing
- 2002-2006: Indonesia Muda
- 2006-2012: Satria Muda BritAma

Coaching
- 2012-2014: Satria Muda Junior
- 2014-2016: Satria Muda Pertamina (assistant)
- 2016-2024; 2024-2025: Satria Muda Pertamina
- 2024: Satria Muda Pertamina (associate coach)
- 2025-present: Satria Muda Bandung (sport director)

Career highlights
- As player: 5× NBL/IBL Indonesia champion (2007-2009, 2011, 2012); 2× IBL Most Valuable Player (2008, 2009); As head coach: 3× IBL champion (2022, 2021, 2018); As assistant coach: NBL Indonesia champion (2015)
Medals
Men's basketball
Representing Indonesia
Southeast Asian Games
Silver medal – second place	2007 Nakhon Ratchasima	Team

Youbel Sondakh (born 19 August 1983) is an Indonesian professional basketball coach, and now sporting director for Satria Muda Bandung of the Indonesian Basketball League (IBL). He is a former professional player.

== Professional career ==
During his professional career, Sondakh faced articular cartilage damage, which influenced his decision to retire in 2012 at the age of 28.

== National team career ==
Sondakh represented the Indonesia national basketball team in the 2007 FIBA Asia Championship that was held in Tokushima, Japan.
