= Ruslan (basketball) =

Indonesian basketball player

No. 23 – Kesatria Bengawan Solo
- Position: Center / power forward
- League: IBL

Personal information
- Born: 16 August 1989 (age 37) Bontang, Indonesia
- Listed height: 6 ft 6 in (1.98 m)
- Listed weight: 194 lb (88 kg)

Career information
- High school: SMAN 3 (Bontang, Indonesia)
- Playing career: 2013–present

Career history
- 2013-2016: Stadium Jakarta
- 2016-2017: NSH Jakarta
- 2017-2019: Stapac Jakarta
- 2021-2023: NSH Mountain Gold Timika
- 2023-present: Kesatria Bengawan Solo

Career highlights
- IBL champion (2019); IBL Defensive Player of the Year (2022); IBL All-Star (2022); All-IBL Indonesian Second Team (2022); All-IBL Indonesian Defensive Team (2022); NBL Indonesia Defensive Player of the Year (2015)

Ruslan (born August 16, 1989) nicknamed "Achim", is an Indonesian professional basketball player for the Kesatria Bengawan Solo of the Indonesian Basketball League (IBL).

Ruslan briefly stopped playing basketball in the 2019–20 season.
