= Bima Riski Ardiansyah =

Indonesian basketball player

Bima Riski
Personal information
- Born: 27 April 1990 (age 36) Blitar, East Java, Indonesia
- Listed height: 183 cm (6 ft 0 in)
- Listed weight: 88 kg (194 lb)

Career information
- Playing career: 2008–2026
- Position: Shooting guard / small forward
- Coaching career: 2025–present

Career history

Playing
- 2008-2014: Bima Sakti Nikko Steel Malang
- 2014-2019: CLS Knights
- 2019-2021: Satria Muda Pertamina
- 2021-2022: RANS PIK Basketball
- 2022-2024: Bali United Basketball
- 2026: Weathers Surabaya

Coaching
- 2025: Pacific Caesar (development coach)

Career highlights
- 2× IBL champions (2016, 2021); ABL champion (2019); All-NBL Indonesia First Team (2013); 2× NBL/IBL All-Star (2013, 2022); NBL Indonesia scoring champion (2013)

Bima Riski Ardiansyah (born April 27, 1990), is an Indonesian former professional basketball player who last played for Weathers Surabaya.

== Professional career ==
During his time with the CLS Knights, he was part of the Indonesian Basketball League Championship team of 2016 and the ASEAN Basketball League Championship team of the 2018–19 season.
