= Reza Guntara =

Indonesian basketball player

Muhammad Reza Guntara
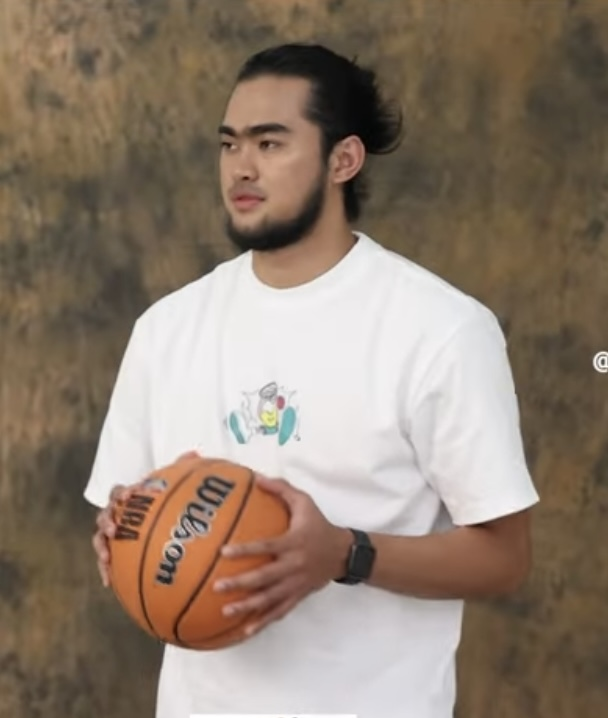
- Guntara in 2024

No. 19 – Pelita Jaya
- Position: Power forward / small forward
- League: IBL

Personal information
- Born: 24 January 1996 (age 30) Bandung, Indonesia
- Listed height: 194 cm (6 ft 4 in)
- Listed weight: 110 kg (243 lb)

Career information
- High school: SMAN 9 (Bandung, Indonesia)
- College: ITHB
- Playing career: 2017–present

Career history
- 2017-2023: Prawira Bandung
- 2023-present: Pelita Jaya

Career highlights
- 2× IBL champion (2023, 2024); IBL Finals MVP (2023); 2× IBL Defensive Player of the Year (2023, 2024); 3× IBL All-Star (2022, 2023, 2025); 3× All-IBL Indonesian First Team (2022-2024); IBL First Team Rookie (2018)

Muhammad Reza Fahdani Guntara (born January 24, 1996) is an Indonesian professional basketball player for the Pelita Jaya Bakrie of the Indonesian Basketball League (IBL).

Guntara has been a member of Indonesia's national basketball team.

== Personal life ==
Guntara has a younger brother, Fhirdan Guntara, who plays for Bogor Hornbills.
