= Dame Diagne =

Indonesian-Senegalese basketball player

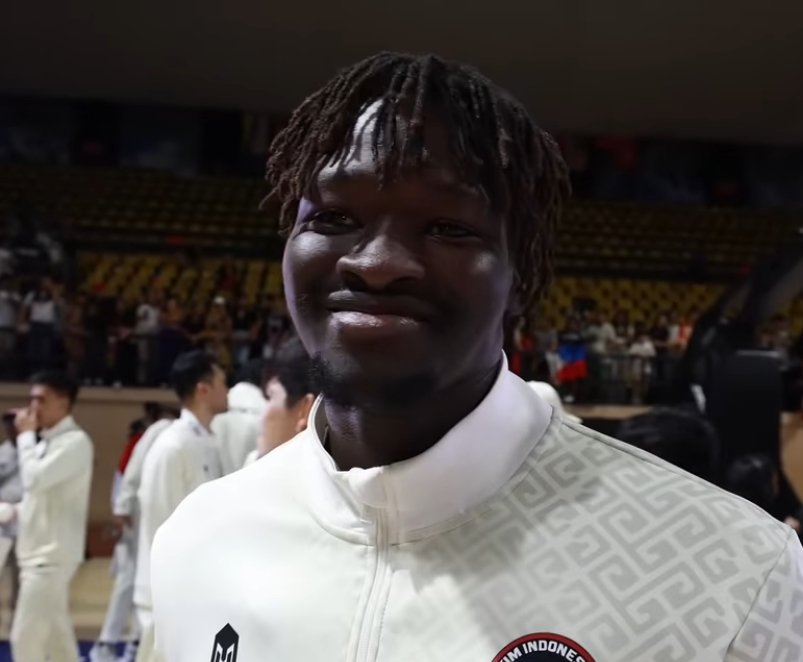
- Diagne with Indonesia in 2025

No. 2 – Satria Muda Bandung
- Position: Power forward / small forward
- League: IBL

Personal information
- Born: 29 July 2005 (age 21) Senegal
- Listed height: 198 cm (6 ft 6 in)
- Listed weight: 90 kg (198 lb)

Career information
- High school: SMAN 116 (Jakarta, Indonesia)
- Playing career: 2021–present

Career history
- 2021-2023: Indonesia Patriots
- 2023-present: Satria Muda Bandung

Career highlights
- 3× IBL All-Star (2026, 2023, 2022); IBL All Indonesian Cup champion (2025)
Medals
Men's basketball
Representing Indonesia
Southeast Asian Games
| Gold medal – first place | 2021 Vietnam | Team |
| Bronze medal – third place | 2025 Thailand | Team |

Dame Diagne (born July 29, 2005) is an Indonesian professional basketball player for the Satria Muda Pertamina of the Indonesian Basketball League (IBL). Mainly plays both forward positions, he can also play the point guard position.

== Early career ==
In his early career, Satria Muda legend, Dwui Eriano is someone who managed to discover Dame's talent. At that time Dwui went to Senegal, and he saw Dame's talent playing basketball at his hometown, which he then decided to recruit Dame to Indonesia.

== Personal life ==
He was naturalized as an Indonesian citizen in 2021 alongside Marques Bolden and Serigne Modou Kane. Dame is now recognised or considered as an Indonesian in FIBA competitions. Via new FIBA rules in late 2025 suggests that, players getting a passport before their 18th birthday are now eligible to play for that country's national team without being designated as naturalized.

== Professional career ==
=== Indonesia Patriots ===
On his last season for the Indonesia Patriots in the 2023 season, Diagne averaged a double-double with 16.3 ppg and 10.7 rpg in 29 games. Previously, in the 2022 season, he also managed to score 10.8 ppg and 11 rpg in 22 matches.

=== Satria Muda ===
On 15 December 2023, Diagne joins Satria Muda Pertamina after the disbandment of the Indonesia Patriots. On 9 June 2024, Diagne made history as the youngest player to join the 1,000 points club, he appeared to lead Satria Muda against Tangerang Hawks with 23 points and 8 rebounds from 8-of-13 shooting attempts during 22 minutes of play. In the third quarter, the eighteen year old completed his points record to 1,000 points.

On 27 December 2024, the Satria Muda Pertamina management decided for Diagne to undergo a skill development program in Madrid, Spain in the Tercera FEB. He joined the famous academy, Zentro Basketball.

== National team career ==
He won the gold medal with the Indonesia's national basketball team in the 2021 SEA Games at just 16 years of age.
