= Rio Disi =

Indonesian basketball player

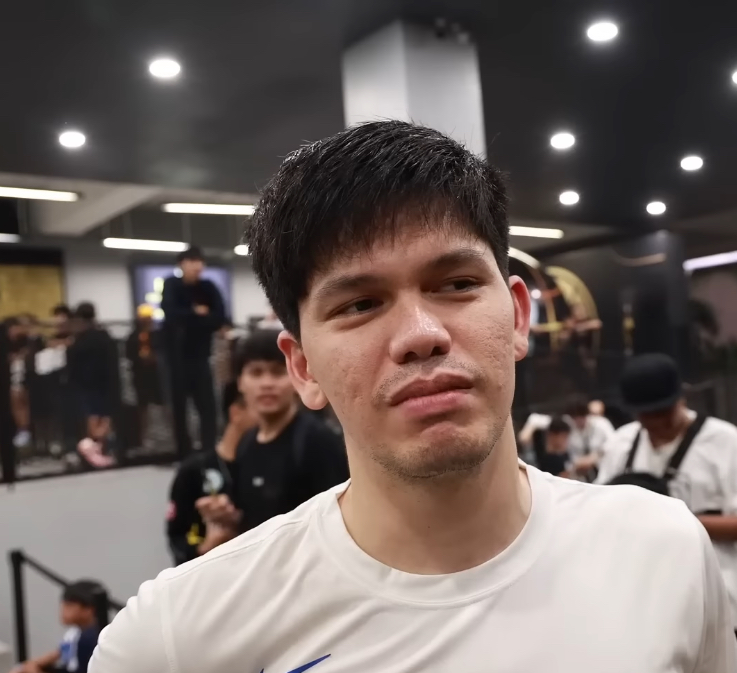
- Rio in 2026

No. 9 – Dewa United Banten
- Position: Shooting guard / point guard
- League: IBL

Personal information
- Born: November 4, 1992 (age 34) Surakarta, Indonesia
- Listed height: 185 cm (6 ft 1 in)
- Listed weight: 75 kg (165 lb)

Career information
- Playing career: 2021–present

Career history
- 2021-2023: West Bandits Solo
- 2023-present: Dewa United Banten

Career highlights
- IBL champion (2025); IBL Local Most Valuable Player (2026); All-IBL Indonesian First Team (2026); 3× IBL All-Star (2022, 2023, 2026); 3× IBL Sixthman of the Year (2022, 2025, 2026); IBL Sportmanship Award (2026)
Medals
Men's basketball
Representing Indonesia
Southeast Asian Games
| Bronze medal – third place | 2025 Thailand | Team |

Rio Disi (born December 4, 1992) is an Indonesian professional basketball player for Dewa United Banten of the Indonesian Basketball League (IBL).

== Professional career ==
=== Dewa United Banten ===
In his first year at Dewa United, Disi averaged 3.8 points, 1.2 rebounds, and 1.7 assists per game for the 2024 season, playing an average of 14.2 minutes per game.

Rio played 25 times for Dewa United Banten in the 2025 season, helping them win their first championship.

In January 28, 2026, Rio scored his career high, 27 points in 28 minutes played againsts Pacific Caesar.

== National team career ==
Rio represented the Indonesia men's national 3x3 team in the 2023 FIBA 3x3 Asia Cup Qualification held in Singapore. They won against Sri Lanka and Tahiti, but lost against Chinese Taipei and failed to qualify.

Disi represented the Indonesia men's national basketball team in the 2025 FIBA Asia Cup qualification and in the 2025 SEA Games held in Bangkok, Thailand.
