= Indonesian Basketball League =

Basketball league in Indonesia

Indonesian Basketball League (IBL)
- Sport: Basketball
- Founded: 2003; 23 years ago
- First season: 2003; 23 years ago
- CEO: Junas Miradiansyah
- Organising body: BBI
- Motto: #LigaKita (#OurLeague)
- No. of teams: 11
- Country: Indonesia
- Continent: FIBA Asia
- Most recent champions: Bogor Hornbills (2026)
- Most titles: Satria Muda Pertamina (11 titles)
- Broadcasters: TVRI (terrestrial); IBL TV (streaming via YouTube)
- Feeder to: Basketball Champions League Asia
- Website: iblindonesia.com
- 2026 IBL Indonesia

The Indonesia Basketball League (IBL; Indonesian: Liga Bola Basket Indonesia) is the preeminent men's professional basketball league in Indonesia, founded by Indonesian Basketball Association (Perbasi) in 2003. From 2010 to 2015 it was known as the National Basketball League (NBL) and organised by DBL Indonesia. In 2016, PT Bola Basket Indonesia acquired Starting5 and after that PT Bola Basket Indonesia assigned by PP Perbasi to organised the league.

== History ==
=== Origin ===
Basketball has a long history in Indonesia. Noted since the 1930s, although not yet officially an independent country, several cities in Indonesia have their own local clubs.

Although it does not yet have a national sports parent, at the time of the holding of the first National Sports Week held in Solo in 1948, basketball had become one of the sports branches that was contested and was received quite lively both in terms of participants and spectators. Three years after, on 23 October 1951, Perbasi was born.

Following the results of the VIII Congress in 1981, Perbasi finally organised a competition between basketball clubs in Indonesia which are the highest competition followed by big clubs from the islands of Sumatra, Java, Kalimantan and Sulawesi. 3 April 1982 is a historic date for the basketball world in Indonesia. On that day, the match between the Rajawali Jakarta club against the Sinar Surya Yogyakarta Spirit marked the start of the first Main Basketball Competition (Kobatama) as well as the first step in the long history of the competition of top clubs in Indonesia. Jakarta Muda Indonesia listed themselves as the first club to win the prestigious Kobatama Champion title. Kobatama as an amateur basketball competition rolled out for 20 years and continued until it stopped in 2010.

=== Founding: IBL started (2003–09) ===
In 2003, the inaugural season of the Indonesian Basketball League (IBL) professional competition was held. 12 teams participated in the IBL inaugural season from 6 cities around Indonesia: Bandung, Bogor, Jakarta, Salatiga, Surabaya, and Yogyakarta. The league was organized independently by Perbasi until 2010. Aspac Jakarta succeeded in becoming the first title winner in 2003.

In 2004, Satria Muda emerged as a new force to get rid of Aspac in the grand final and appear as a champion. Aspac won the title of champion again in 2005. The following years (2006–09) belonged to Satria Muda Jakarta.

In addition to the annual regular competition, IBL also holds an IBL Cup Tournament at the beginning or end of the season. In 2009, Satria Muda Jakarta defeated Pelita Jaya Jakarta in the final held at GOR C-Tra Arena Bandung. In 2008, Garuda Bandung managed to steal the previous IBL Cup Tournament title, in 2006 and 2007 also belonged to Satria Muda.

Unfortunately, the development of IBL did not go as expected. After repeatedly changing promoters, the league threatened to disband at the end of 2009.

=== Under DBL: NBL (2010–15) ===
NBL Indonesia logo

All participating club representatives also asked PT DBL Indonesia to manage and to operate the league. Previously, DBL Indonesia was considered to be successful in managing the Development Basketball League (DBL), the largest student basketball league in Indonesia, which in 2010 had expanded to 21 cities in Indonesia, followed by around 25,000 players and officials.

To restore the prestige of this professional league, re-branding is inevitable. Starting in 2010 until 2015, IBL, operated by DBL Indonesia, changed its name to the Indonesian National Basketball League (NBL). A number of changes were made, trying to increase the number of matches again, bringing the league closer to its fans.

=== IBL Reborn (2015–present) ===
In 2015, Perbasi chose Starting5 to be the league operator. Dubbed the 'IBL Reborn', the league's name was change back to IBL from NBL. IBL then began to gain momentum and garnered nationwide support year by year.

In 2017, the league began to allow clubs to sign foreign players limited by salary cap and height restriction regulations.

== Clubs ==
=== Current clubs (2027 season) ===
Locations of 2026 IBL teams
Locations of Jabodetabek-based 2026 IBL teams

Club	City	Homebase	Joined	Head coach
Bogor Hornbills	Bogor	GOR Laga Tangkas	2022	(Spain) Cesar Camara Perez
Dewa United Banten	Tangerang	Dewa United Arena	2020	(United States) David Singleton
Hangtuah JG Liem	Jakarta	GOR Ciracas	2016	(Indonesia) Yohanes Kristian (int.)
Kesatria Bengawan Solo	Solo	Sritex Arena	2021	(England) Anthony Garbelotto
Pacific Caesar Surabaya	Surabaya	GOR Pacific Caesar	2016	(England) (Netherlands) Devon van Oostrum
Pelita Jaya Jakarta	Jakarta	GOR Soemantri Brodjonegoro	2016	(Indonesia) Johannis Winar
Rajawali Medan	Medan	GOR Universitas Medan	2022	(Serbia) (Netherlands) Toni Vujanic
RANS Simba Bogor	Bogor	Gymnasium Sekolah Vokasi IPB	2022	(Argentina) Ramiro Diaz Cuello
Satria Muda Pertamina Bandung	Bandung	Bandung Arena	2016	(Indonesia) Youbel Sondakh
Satya Wacana Saints Salatiga	Semarang	GOR Basket Susilo Wibowo	2016	(Indonesia) Jerry Lolowang

== Former clubs ==
- Louvre Surabaya (merged with Dewa United in 2021, the license now under Dewa United)
- JNE Bandung (rename to JNE Siliwangi Bandung in 2016, Siliwangi Bandung in 2017, rename to Siliwangi Bogor in 2018, rename to Evos Thunder Bogor in 2021, the license now under Rajawali Medan)
- West Bandit Solo (withdrew in 2023, the license now under Kesatria Bengawan Solo)
- Stapac Jakarta (withdrew in 2020)
- CLS Knights Surabaya (withdrew in 2018)
- Stadium Jakarta (withdrew in 2017, merged with Aspac)
- NSH Mountain Gold Timika (license removed by the IBL in 2023)
- Bali United Basketball (withdrew ahead of 2026 season due to internal reasons)
- Bima Perkasa Jogja (withdrew ahead of 2026 season due to internal reasons)
- Prawira Harum Bandung (merged with Satria Muda Jakarta in 2026 to form Satria Muda Pertamina Bandung)
- Tangerang Hawks (withdrew ahead of 2027 season)

== Championship history ==
Season	League name	Champions	Runners-up
2003	Indonesian Basketball League	Aspac Jakarta (1)	Satria Muda BritAma
2004	Indonesian Basketball League	Satria Muda BritAma (1)	Aspac Jakarta
2005	Indonesian Basketball League	Aspac Jakarta (2)	Satria Muda BritAma
2006	Indonesian Basketball League	Satria Muda BritAma (2)	Aspac Jakarta
2007	Indonesian Basketball League	Satria Muda BritAma (3)	Aspac Jakarta
2008	Indonesian Basketball League	Satria Muda BritAma (4)	Garuda Bandung
2009	Indonesian Basketball League	Satria Muda BritAma (5)	Aspac Jakarta
2010–11	National Basketball League	Satria Muda BritAma (6)	CLS Knights Surabaya
2011–12	National Basketball League	Satria Muda BritAma (7)	Aspac Jakarta
2012–13	National Basketball League	Aspac Jakarta (3)	Pelita Jaya Jakarta
2013–14	National Basketball League	Aspac Jakarta (4)	Satria Muda BritAma
2014–15	National Basketball League	Satria Muda BritAma (8)	Pelita Jaya Jakarta
2016	Indonesian Basketball League	CLS Knights Surabaya (1)	Pelita Jaya Jakarta
2017	Indonesian Basketball League	Pelita Jaya Jakarta (1)	Satria Muda BritAma
2017–18	Indonesian Basketball League	Satria Muda Pertamina (9)	Pelita Jaya Jakarta
2018–19	Indonesian Basketball League	Stapac Jakarta (5)	Satria Muda Pertamina
2020	Indonesian Basketball League	Season abandoned due to COVID-19 pandemic in Indonesia	
2021	Indonesian Basketball League	Satria Muda Pertamina (10)	Pelita Jaya Jakarta
2022	Indonesian Basketball League	Satria Muda Pertamina (11)	Pelita Jaya Jakarta
2023	Indonesian Basketball League	Prawira Bandung (1)	Pelita Jaya Jakarta
2024	Indonesian Basketball League	Pelita Jaya Jakarta (2)	Satria Muda Pertamina
2025	Indonesian Basketball League	Dewa United Banten (1)	Pelita Jaya Jakarta
2026	Indonesian Basketball League	Bogor Hornbills (1)	Pelita Jaya Jakarta

== Draft ==
Years		Players	Selected by	College	IBL rookie statistics		
Years		Players	Selected by	College	PPG	RPG	APG
2017	Foreign	(United States) DeChriston McKinney	CLS Knights Surabaya	Arkansas Tech University	11.3	10.6	0.6
2018	Foreign	(United States) DeAngelo Hamilton*	Satya Wacana Salatiga	Washington State University	N/A	N/A	N/A
2018	Local	(Indonesia) Sabda Ahesa	Siliwangi Bandung	University of Notre Dame Australia	3.0	2.0	0.0
2018	Foreign	(United States) Martavious Irving	Siliwangi Bandung	Kansas State University	20.3	5.4	3.6
2019	Local	(Indonesia) Nikholas Mahesa	Louvre Surabaya	Harapan Bangsa Institute of Technology	1.7	1.6	1.2
2019	Foreign	(United States) Savon Goodman	Louvre Surabaya	Shaw University	22.9	12.9	2.4
2020	Local	(Indonesia) David Simeone Lavi	Bima Perkasa	PB Kumala Jaya	0.5	0.0	0.3
2021	Local	(Indonesia) Noval Mahadi	Tangerang Hawks	Budi Luhur University	0.5	0.0	0.3
2021	Foreign	(United States) Richard Ross Jr.	Tangerang Hawks	Old Dominion	16.0	9.3	2.1
2022	Local	(Indonesia) Victor Lobbu	Bima Perkasa	Pelita Harapan University	3.97	2.06	1.81
2022	Foreign	(United States) Cameron Coleman	Bima Perkasa	York College	17.78	8.25	2.75

Note : *The player didn't play in IBL Seasons

In the 2024 season of the IBL, the draft system would not continue.

== Scoring leaders ==
Season	League	Name	Club	PPG
2011	NBL	(Indonesia) Ary Chandra	Pelita Jaya Energi Mega Persada	14.1
2012	NBL	(Indonesia) Yanuar Dwi Priasmoro	Bimasakti Nikko Steel Malang	17.3
2013	NBL	(Indonesia) Bima Riski Ardiansyah	Bimasakti Nikko Steel Malang	16.5
2014	NBL	(Indonesia) Merio Ferdiansyah	Stadium Jakarta	18.1
2015	NBL	(Indonesia) Respati Ragil	Satya Wacana Salatiga	19.5
2016	IBL	(United States) (Indonesia) Jamarr Johnson	CLS Knights Surabaya	15.2
2017	IBL	(United States) Gary Jacobs Jr.	NSH Jakarta	27.5
2018	IBL	(United States) Madarious Gibbs	Satya Wacana Salatiga	27.1
2019	IBL	(United States) Madarious Gibbs	Satya Wacana Salatiga	29.7
2020	IBL	(United States) Dior Lowhorn	Pelita Jaya Bakrie	28.3
2021	IBL	(United States) (Indonesia) Jamarr Johnson	Louvre Dewa United	20.2
2022	IBL	(United States) Shavar Newkirk	NSH Mountain Gold	21.9
2023	IBL	(Dominican Republic) Brandone Francis	Prawira Harum Bandung	23.9
2024	IBL	(United States) Michael Qualls	Borneo Hornbills	27.1
2025	IBL	(United States) Quintin Dove	Rajawali Medan	29.3
2026	IBL	(United States) (Dominican Republic) Adonnecy Bramah	Pacific Caesar Surabaya	30.4

== Awards ==
=== Local MVP/Sonny Hendrawan award ===
Season	Name	Club
2003	(Indonesia) Denny Sumargo	Aspac Jakarta
2004	(Indonesia) I Made Sudiadnyana	Bhinneka Sritex Solo
2005	(Indonesia) Rony Gunawan	Aspac Jakarta
2006	(Indonesia) Kelly Purwanto	Pelita Jaya Esia
2008	(Indonesia) Youbel Sondakh	Satria Muda Pertamina
2009	(Indonesia) Youbel Sondakh	Satria Muda Pertamina
2010	(Indonesia) I Made Sudiadnyana	Garuda Bandung
2011	(Indonesia) I Made Sudiadnyana	Garuda Bandung
2012	(Indonesia) Yanuar Dwi Priasmoro	Bimasakti Nikko Steel Malang
2013	(Indonesia) Pringgo Regowo	Aspac Jakarta
2014	(Indonesia) Ponsianus Nyoman Indrawan	Pelita Jaya
2015	(Indonesia) Adhi Pratama	Pelita Jaya
2016	(United States) (Indonesia) Jamarr Andre Johnson	CLS Knights
2017	(United States) (Indonesia) Arki Dikania Wisnu	Satria Muda Pertamina Jakarta
2018	(Indonesia) Xaverius Prawiro	Pelita Jaya
2019	(Indonesia) Kaleb Ramot Gemilang	Stapac Jakarta
2020	(Indonesia) Abraham Damar Grahita	Indonesia Patriots
2021	(United States) (Indonesia) Jamarr Andre Johnson	Louvre Dewa United
2022	(Indonesia) Abraham Damar Grahita	Prawira Harum Bandung
2023	(Indonesia) Kaleb Ramot Gemilang	Dewa United Banten
2024	(Indonesia) Abraham Damar Grahita	Satria Muda Pertamina Jakarta
2025	(Indonesia) Agassi Goantara	Pelita Jaya
2026	(Indonesia) Rio Disi	Dewa United Banten

=== League Most Valuable Player Award ===
Season	Name	Club
2026	(United States) Travin Thibodeaux	Bogor Hornbills

=== Rookie of the year ===
Season	Name	Club
2026	(Indonesia) Henry Alexander Sualang	Satya Wacana Saints Salatiga

=== Coach of the year ===
Season	Name	Club
2005	(Indonesia) Amran	Garuda Bandung
2010	(Indonesia) Rastafari Horongbala	Pelita Jaya Energi Mega Persada
2011	(Philippines) Nat Canson	Muba Hangtuah Sumatera Selatan
2012	(Indonesia) Rastafari Horongbala	Aspac Jakarta
2013	(South Korea) Kim Dong-Won	CLS Knights Surabaya
2014	(Indonesia) Occtaviarro Romely	JNE Bandung Utama
2015	(Indonesia) Cokorda Raka	Satria Muda BritAma
2016	(Indonesia) Efri Meldi	Satya Wacana Salatiga
2017	(Indonesia) Johannis Winar	Pelita Jaya Bakrie Jakarta
2018	(Indonesia) Wahyu Widayat Jati	NSH Jakarta
2019	(Indonesia) Wahyu Widayat Jati	NSH Jakarta
2020	(Indonesia) Antonius Ferry Rinaldo	NSH Jakarta
2021	(United States) David Singleton	Bima Perkasa Jogja
2022	(United States) David Singleton	Prawira Harum Bandung
2023	(United States) David Singleton	Prawira Harum Bandung
2024	(United States) David Singleton	Prawira Harum Bandung
2025	(England) Tony Garbelotto	RANS Simba Bogor
2026	(Spain) Cesar Camara Perez	Bogor Hornbills

=== Sixth man of the year ===
Season	Name	Club
2011	(Indonesia) Rahmad Febri Utomo	CLS Knights Surabaya
2012	(Indonesia) Arki Dikania Wisnu	Satria Muda Pertamina Jakarta
2013	(Indonesia) Andakara Prastawa	Aspac Jakarta
2014	(Philippines) (Indonesia) Ebrahim Enguio Lopez	Aspac Jakarta
2015	(Indonesia) Rony Gunawan	Satria Muda Pertamina Jakarta
2016	(Indonesia) Andakara Prastawa	Aspac Jakarta
2017	(Indonesia) Arif Hidayat	CLS Knights Surabaya
2018	(Indonesia) Andakara Prastawa	Aspac Jakarta
2019	(Indonesia) Abraham Damar Grahita	Stapac Jakarta
2020	(Indonesia) Arki Dikania Wisnu	Indonesia Patriots
2021	(Indonesia) Andre Adriano	West Bandits Solo
2022	(Indonesia) Rio Disi	West Bandits Combiphar Solo
2023	(Indonesia) Hans Abraham	Prawira Harum Bandung
2024	(Indonesia) Hans Abraham	Prawira Harum Bandung
2025	(Indonesia) Rio Disi	Dewa United Banten
2026	(Indonesia) Rio Disi	Dewa United Banten

=== Defensive player of the year ===
Season	Name	Club
2011	(Indonesia) Isman Thoyib	Aspac Jakarta
2012	(Indonesia) Yanuar Dwi Priasmoro	Bimasakti Nikko Steel Malang
2013	(Indonesia) Dimaz Muharri	CLS Knights
2014	(Indonesia) Ponsianus Nyoman Indrawan	Pelita Jaya
2015	(Indonesia) Ruslan Ruslan	Stadium Jakarta
2016	(Indonesia) Firman Dwi Nugroho	Satya Wacana Salatiga
2017	(United States) Nate Maxey	Satya Wacana Salatiga
2018	(United States) (Bahrain) C. J. Giles	Pelita Jaya Energi Mega Persada
2019	(United States) Michael Vigilance Jr.	Bogor Siliwangi
2020	(Indonesia) Indra Muhamad	Pacific Caesar Surabaya
2021	(United States) (Indonesia) Jamarr Johnson	Louvre Dewa United
2022	(Indonesia) Ruslan Ruslan	NSH Mountain Gold Timika
2023	(Indonesia) Muhammad Reza Guntara	Prawira Harum Bandung
2024	(Indonesia) Muhammad Reza Guntara	Pelita Jaya
2025	(Indonesia) Galank Gunawan	RANS Simba Bogor
2026	(Indonesia) Yudha Saputera	Satria Muda Bandung

=== Finals MVP ===
Season	Name	Club
2005	(Indonesia) Riko Hantono	Dell Aspac Jakarta
2013	(Indonesia) Fandi Andika Ramadhani	Dell Aspac Jakarta
2014	(Indonesia) Andakara Prastawa	Dell Aspac Jakarta
2015	(Indonesia) Arki Dikania Wisnu	Satria Muda Pertamina Jakarta
2016	(United States) (Indonesia) Jamarr Andre Johnson	CLS Knights Surabaya
2017	(United States) Martavious Irving	Pelita Jaya
2018	(United States) (Indonesia) Jamarr Andre Johnson	Satria Muda Pertamina Jakarta
2019	(United States) Savon Goodman	Stapac Jakarta
2021	(Indonesia) Hardianus Lakudu	Satria Muda Pertamina Jakarta
2022	(United States) (Germany) Brachon Griffin	Satria Muda Pertamina Jakarta
2023	(Indonesia) Muhammad Reza Guntara	Prawira Harum Bandung
2024	(United States) (Indonesia) Anthony Beane	Pelita Jaya
2025	(Mexico) Joshua Ibarra	Dewa United Banten
2026	(United States) Travin Thibodeaux	Bogor Hornbills

=== Most improved player ===
Season	Name	Club
2016	(Indonesia) Muhammad Rizal Falconi	Garuda Bandung
2017	(Indonesia) Abraham Damar Grahita	Aspac Jakarta
2018	(Indonesia) Nuke Tri Saputra	Pacific Caesar Surabaya
2019	(Indonesia) Widyanta Putra Teja	Stapac Jakarta
2020	(Indonesia) Sandy Ibrahim Aziz	Satria Muda Pertamina Jakarta
2021	(Indonesia) Kevin Moses Poetiray	Louvre Dewa United
2022	(Indonesia) Hengki Infandi	NSH Mountain Gold Timika
2023	(Indonesia) Argus Sanyudy	Bima Perkasa Jogja
2024	(Indonesia) Avin Kurniawan	Bima Perkasa Jogja
2025	(Indonesia) Neo Putu Pande	Bali United Basketball
2026	(Indonesia) Yesaya Saudale	Tangerang Hawks

=== All-Indonesian Cup MVP ===
Season	Name	Club
2016	(Indonesia) Ponsianus Nyoman Indrawan	Pelita Jaya Energi Mega Persada
2019	(Indonesia) Mei Joni	Stapac Jakarta
2020	(Indonesia) Arki Dikania Wisnu	Satria Muda Pertamina Jakarta
2023	(Indonesia) Andakara Prastawa	Pelita Jaya
2024	(Indonesia) Brandon Jawato	Pelita Jaya
2025	(Indonesia) Abraham Damar Grahita	Satria Muda Bandung
2026	(Indonesia) Abraham Damar Grahita	Satria Muda Bandung

=== Sportsmanship award ===
Season	Name	Club
2011	(Indonesia) Youbel Sondakh	Satria Muda Pertamina Jakarta
2012	(Indonesia) Max Yanto	NSH Jakarta
2013	(Indonesia) Max Yanto	NSH Jakarta
2014	(Indonesia) Rony Gunawan	Satria Muda Pertamina Jakarta
2015	(Indonesia) Andrie Ekayana Santosa	Muba Hangtuah Sumatera Selatan
2025	(British Virgin Islands) (Indonesia) Lester Prosper	Dewa United Banten
2026	(Indonesia) Rio Disi	Dewa United Banten

== Commercial partners ==
Season(s)	League name	Title sponsor	Brand
2010–11	National Basketball League (NBL)	Telkom Indonesia	Flexi
2011–12	National Basketball League (NBL)	Telkom Indonesia	Flexi
2012–13	National Basketball League (NBL)	Telkom Indonesia	Speedy
2013–14	National Basketball League (NBL)	Telkom Indonesia	Speedy
2014–15	National Basketball League (NBL)	IndiHome	
2016–2018	Indonesian Basketball League (IBL)	None	
2018–19	Indonesian Basketball League (IBL)	None	
2020	Indonesian Basketball League (IBL)	Pertamina	Pertamax
2021	Indonesian Basketball League (IBL)	Pertamina	Pertamax
2022–2024	Indonesian Basketball League (IBL)	Tokopedia	Tokopedia
2025–2026	Indonesian Basketball League (IBL)	GoPay	GoPay
