= IndiHome =

Home telephone, internet, and Internet Protocol television services

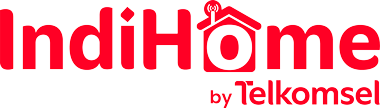
- Type: Internet; Internet protocol home telephone Internet protocol television
- Country: Indonesia
- Motto: Semua Rumah Semua Bisa (All House, All Can) (2020–2021); Aktivitas Tanpa Batas (Limitless Activities) (2021–present)
- Parent: Telkomsel
- Launch date: 2015 (as IndiHome)
- Former names: TelkomNet Instan (1994–2004); Speedy (2004–2015)
- Official website: www.telkomsel.com/indihome

IndiHome (abbreviated from Indonesia Digital Home) is a home telephone, internet, and Internet Protocol television services owned by Telkomsel since 1 July 2023. Prior to Telkomsel's takeover, it was owned by Telkomsel's majority shareholder Telkom Indonesia. IndiHome was launched in 2015 to replace Speedy. Its packages also come with digital music portal services and home automation.

IndiHome services can only be applied to homes in which there are fiber-optic networks available from Telkom (FTTH) and areas that still use copper cables. Telkom claims that IndiHome products have had up to 2,000 units ordered each day throughout 2015. As of May 2015, the number of IndiHome customers has reached 350,000 throughout Indonesia.

== Products ==
IndiHome provides the following internet packages:

- Single Play: provides optical fiber connections with internet services (Internet on Fiber/High Speed Internet) with or without landlines.
- Dual Play: provides fiber-optic connections with internet and home telephone services (Voice).
- Triple Play: provides fiber optic connections with internet, home telephone and Internet Protocol television (MAXStream TV) services.
