= Speedy (Telkom) =

- Type: Internet service provider
- Country: Indonesia
- Availability: Nationwide
- Motto: Broadband Access (2004-2012, logo); Akses Internet Cepat (2004-2008; Speed That You Can Trust (2008-2010); Lead your life (2010-2012); True Broadband (2012-2015)
- Owner: Telkom Indonesia
- Launch date: 2004
- Dissolved: 2015
- Former names: TelkomNet Instan
- Official website: www.telkomspeedy.com (closed)
- Replaced by: IndiHome

Speedy was the trade name for broadband internet services offered by Telkom Indonesia. As of December 2014, it offered a range of packages for download speeds between 512 kbit/s and 100 Mbit/s, with some plans including additional advertising inserted by Telkom. Speedy was replaced in 2015 with the fiber-based IndiHome.

== Slogans ==
- Akses Internet Cepat (Fast Internet Access) (2004–2008)
- Speed You Can Trust (2008–2010)
- Lead Your Life (2010–2013)
- True Broadband (2013–2015)
