= Richard Ross (basketball) =

American basketball player

Free agent
- Position: Small forward

Personal information
- Born: June 16, 1992 (age 34) Wichita Falls, Texas, U.S.
- Listed height: 6 ft 5 in (1.96 m)
- Listed weight: 239 lb (108 kg)

Career information
- High school: Hirschi (Wichita Falls, Texas)
- College: Old Dominion (2011–2015)
- NBA draft: 2015: undrafted
- Playing career: 2016–present

Career history
- 2016: Gimle BBK
- 2017: Joondalup Wolves
- 2017–2018: B.C. Mess
- 2019: Anhui PutianXingfa
- 2019: Rain or Shine Elasto Painters
- 2021: Halcones de Xalapa
- 2022: Tangerang Hawks
- 2022: Marinos B.B.C.

Richard David Ross Jr (born June 16, 1992) is an American professional basketball player.

== Professional career ==
=== Joondalup Wolves (2017) ===
In his debut with the Wolves, Ross recorded 16 points and 3 rebounds in a 104–101 win over the Cockburn Cougars.

=== Rain or Shine Elasto Painters (2019) ===
With Rain or Shine Elasto Painter's current import, Kwame Alexander, out due to an injury. The Elasto Painters taps Ross to be their fourth import of the 2019 PBA Governors' Cup. In his PBA debut, Ross recorded 20 points, 8 rebounds and 4 assists in just 28 minutes of playing time on a 91–111 loss to the NLEX Road Warriors.
