= Satria Muda Bandung =

Indonesian basketball team

- 2026 IBL Indonesia
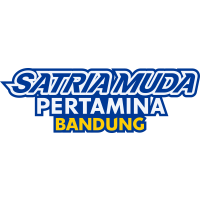
- Leagues: Kobatama; 1996–2002; IBL/NBL; 2003–present ABL; 2009–2011
- Founded: 1993
- History: Satria Muda (1993–1996); AdeS Satria Muda (1997); Mahaka Satria Muda (1998–2002); Satria Muda BritAma (2003–2015); Satria Muda Pertamina (2015–2025); Satria Muda Bandung (2025–present)
- Arena: Bandung Arena
- Capacity: 5000
- Location: Bandung, Indonesia
- Team colors: Yellow, Blue, White
- President: Baim Wong
- Head coach: Djordje Jovicic
- Ownership: PT Persib Bandung Bermartabat
- Affiliation: Persib Bandung
- Championships: Kobatama: 1 (1999); IBL/NBL: 11 (2004, 2006, 2007, 2008, 2009, 2010–11, 2011–12, 2014–15, 2018, 2021, 2022); IBL All Indonesian: 3 (2020, 2025, 2026); SEABA Champions Cup: 1 (2008)
- Website: www.satriamuda.id
| Home | Away | Third |

Former logo

Satria Muda Pertamina Bandung (colloquially known as SM) is an Indonesian professional basketball team currently playing in the Indonesian Basketball League (IBL). Based in the capital city Jakarta from 1993 till 2025, they are now based in the West Javanian capital of Bandung after merging with Prawira Bandung in 2025. Satria Muda was Indonesia's representative team to the inaugural Asean Basketball League (ABL). Throughout their history, Satria Muda have been known as one of the most successful team's in the league, winning twelve IBL and Kobatama championships, and one SEABA Champions Cup back in 2008.

== History ==
=== KOBATAMA era ===
Founded by Doedi Gambiro on October 28, 1993, initially known as Satria Muda, they began play in the KOBATAMA in 1996 and advanced to the final four, but lost to Aspac Jakarta and only got the fourth place after losing to Bima Sakti Nikko Steel Malang. They got "the best newcomers" tribute award in 1996. In 1997, Satria Muda endorsed by The Coca-Cola Company's AdeS mineral waters, and the team identity was changed to AdeS Satria Muda. The loss of the 1996 final four sparked the "Indonesian basketball el-clasico" between Satria Muda and Aspac Jakarta, especially in the grand finals since 2002.

According to Dwui "Iboy" Eriano, they never won in the 1998 season. But, in 1999, when Erick Thohir's PT Abdi Bangsa Tbk began as the team's major sponsor, and changed the team's identity to Mahaka Satria Muda, they recovered and defeated 2-times (1997–1998) champion Panasia Indosyntec Bandung in the final four and dethroned the Surakarta's Bhinneka Sritex in the grand finals.

=== IBL era ===
Satria Muda then made the jump to the Indonesian Basketball League upon its foundation in 2003. A year later, Bank Rakyat Indonesia, through its BritAma savings account, became the team's major sponsor, and the team identity became Satria Muda BritAma. In 2015, Pertamina became the team's major sponsor, and the team name became Satria Muda Pertamina.

It has won ten domestic titles (1999, 2004, 2006, 2007, 2008, 2009, 2010–11, 2011–12, 2014–15, and 2018) and has also won the SEABA Champions Cup in 2008 by dethroning Philippines' Harbour Centre Batang Pier.

Satria Muda is one of the six founding teams of the first pan-Asean pro basketball league, the ASEAN Basketball League (ABL), which began play on 11 October 2009, but remained in the Indonesian Basketball League. In the ABL, it allows them to add two foreign reinforcements and up to three players from Asean countries. They finished third overall in the regular season standings and became the runners-up in the inaugural season of the ABL, losing to the Philippine Patriots 0–3 in the championship.

For the 2010–11 season, Satria Muda fielded two teams, for the ABL and the domestic NBL Indonesia respectively. The team competing in the NBL was composed of the 2009–10 ABL team, while the new ABL team was a mixture of new local players, Filipino imports, and American imports.

== Honours ==
| Title | Winners | Runners-up | 3rd Place | 4th Place |
|---|---|---|---|---|
| Kobatama | 1999 | | | |
| ABL Regular Season | | | 2009–10 | |
| ABL Grand Finals | | 2009–10 (Runners-up) | | |
| IBL Championship | 2004, 2006, 2007, 2008, 2009, 2018, 2021, 2022 | 2003, 2005, 2017, 2018–19, 2024 | | |
| NBL Championship | 2010–11, 2011–12, 2014–15 | 2013–14 | | |

== Achievements (2009–10) ==
| Year | ABL Regular Season Position | ABL Grand Finals Position |
|---|---|---|
| 2009–10 | 3rd Place | Runners-up |

== Personnel ==
Note: Flags indicate national team eligibility at FIBA-sanctioned events. Players may hold other non-FIBA nationalities not displayed.

Satria Muda Bandung roster
Players
Coaches

| Pos. | No. | Nat. | Name | Ht. | Wt. |
|---|---|---|---|---|---|
| PF | 0 | (Indonesia) | Butarbutar, Rheza Saputra | 1.93 m (6 ft 4 in) | 86 kg (190 lb) |
| F | 2 | (Indonesia) | Diagne, Dame | 1.98 m (6 ft 6 in) | 90 kg (198 lb) |
| PG | 3 | (Indonesia) | Saputera, Yudha | 1.75 m (5 ft 9 in) | 70 kg (154 lb) |
| G | 4 | (Indonesia) | Damar Grahita, Abraham | 1.80 m (5 ft 11 in) | 75 kg (165 lb) |
| SG | 8 | (Indonesia) | Ibrahim Aziz, Sandy | 1.88 m (6 ft 2 in) | 79 kg (174 lb) |
| PF | 14 | (Indonesia) | Chalias, Julian | 1.97 m (6 ft 6 in) | 85 kg (187 lb) |
| F/C | 16 | (Indonesia) | Wiguna, Pandu | 1.94 m (6 ft 4 in) | 78 kg (172 lb) |
| F | 21 | (United States) | Jones, Jalen (I) | 1.98 m (6 ft 6 in) | 100 kg (220 lb) |
| SG | 22 | (Indonesia) | Raisha, Raden (R) | 1.83 m (6 ft 0 in) | 66 kg (146 lb) |
| SF | 24 | (Indonesia) | Manansang, Fernando | 1.85 m (6 ft 1 in) | 84 kg (185 lb) |
| G | 26 | (United States) | Glover, Niven (I) | 1.90 m (6 ft 3 in) | 93 kg (205 lb) |
| SG | 30 | (Indonesia) | Kenneth, Hosea (R) | 1.93 m (6 ft 4 in) | 80 kg (176 lb) |
| PF | 35 | (Austria) | Bezhanishvili, Giorgi (I) | 2.05 m (6 ft 9 in) | 111 kg (245 lb) |
| F | 67 | (Indonesia) | Chalias, Adrien | 1.97 m (6 ft 6 in) | 85 kg (187 lb) |
| PG | 71 | (Indonesia) | Putra Teja, Widyanta | 1.80 m (5 ft 11 in) | 73 kg (161 lb) |
| G | 77 | (Indonesia) | Tangkulung, Greans | 1.78 m (5 ft 10 in) | 62 kg (137 lb) |

Head coach

- (Serbia) Djordje Jovicic

Assistant coach(es)

- (Indonesia) Abdurrachman

Legend

- (C) Team captain
- (I) Import player
- (R) Rookie
- Injured

- Roster
Updated: 24 December 2023

=== Depth chart ===
| Pos. | Starting 5 | Bench |
|---|---|---|
| C | Giorgi Bezhanishvili | Pandu Wiguna |
| PF | Jalen Jones | Julian Chalias |
| SF | Dame Diagne | Sandy Ibrahim Aziz |
| SG | Niven Hart | Abraham Damar Grahita |
| PG | Yudha Saputera | Widyanta Putra Teja |

== Management ==
| Position | Name |
|---|---|
| Commissioner | Umara Andra Rustomo |
| Power Executor | Adhitia Putra Hermawan |
| Club President | Baim Wong |
| Club Director | Christian Ronaldo Sitepu |
| Sport Director | Youbel Sondakh |

== Players in National Teams ==
| Pos | Name | Height | Country | Schools/Province/Country |
|---|---|---|---|---|
| G | Widyanta Putra Teja | 5–11 | Indonesia | SMA IPH Surabaya |
| PF | Juan Laurent | 6–4 | Indonesia | Pelita Harapan University |
| C/F | Julian Chalias | 6–7 | Indonesia | Kuta, Bali |
| F | Dame Diagne | 6–6 | Indonesia | Senegal |
| G | Abraham Damar Grahita | 5–11 | Indonesia | Esa Unggul University |

== Accomplishments and awards ==
=== Individual awards ===
IBL Rookie of the Year

- Juan Laurent – 2017
- Arki Dikania Wisnu – 2012
- Rivaldo Tandra – 2020

IBL Most Valuable Player

- Arki Dikania Wisnu – 2017

IBL Sixthman of the Year

- Rony Gunawan – 2015

IBL Defensive Player of the Year

- Galank Gunawan – 2013

IBL Finals MVP

- Arki Dikania Wisnu – 2015
- Jamarr Andre Johnson – 2018
- Hardianus Lakudu – 2021
- Brachon Griffin – 2022

IBL Sportmanship Award

- Youbel Sondakh – 2011

IBL Most Improved Player

- Sandy Ibrahim Aziz – 2020

== SMP Legends ==
Retired numbers
| No. | Name | Position | Tenure |
|---|---|---|---|
| 6 | Amran A Sinta | G | 1995–2001 |
| 12 | Syahrizal Affandi | PG | 1999–2003 |
| 18 | Fictor Gideon Roring | C | 1999–2001 |
| 7 | Dwui Eriano | SF | 1995–2008 |
| 10 | Wahyu Widayat Jati | PF | 1995–2009 |
| 34 | Wellyanson Situmorang | PF | 2000–2011 |
| 9 | Youbel Sondakh | SF | 2006–2013 |
| 32 | Rony Gunawan | PF/C | 2006–2016 |
| 15 | Christian Ronaldo Sitepu | PF/C | 206-2018 |

== Notable players ==
– Set a club record or won an individual award as a professional player.
– Played at least one official international match for his senior national team at any time.

- (Indonesia) Hardianus Lakudu
- (Indonesia) Johannis Winar
- (Indonesia) Syahrizal Affandi
- (Indonesia) Dwui Eriano
- (Indonesia) Rony Gunawan
- (Indonesia) Amin Prihantono
- (Indonesia) Fictor Gideon Roring
- (Indonesia) Amran Andi Sinta
- (Indonesia) Wellyanson Situmorang
- (Indonesia) Denny Sumargo
- (Indonesia) Kevin Sitorus
- (Indonesia) Erick Christopher Sebayang
- (Indonesia) (United States) Jamarr Andre Johnson
- (Indonesia) Donny Ristanto
- (Indonesia) Kristian Liem
- (Indonesia) Hans Abraham
- (Indonesia) Bima Riski Ardiansyah
- (Indonesia) Muhammad Rizal Falconi
- (Indonesia) Arki Dikania Wisnu
- (Indonesia) Ali Bagir
- (Indonesia) Avan Seputra

=== Foreigners ===
- (United States) Wendell Lewis
- (United States) Le'Bryan Nash
- (United States) Warren Washington
- (Ukraine) Artem Pustovyi
- (United States) Myke Henry
- (United States) Rick Jackson
- (United States) Jarred Shaw
- (United States) Elgin Cook
- (United States) Shannon Evans
- (France) Amine Noua
- (United States) Jordan Ivy-Curry
- (United States) Chad Brown
- (Austria) (Georgia (country)) Giorgi Bezhanishvili
- (United States) Jalen Jones

== See also ==
- Mahaputri BritAma Jakarta, the women's counterpart
