= Abraham Damar Grahita =

Indonesian professional basketball player

Abraham Grahita
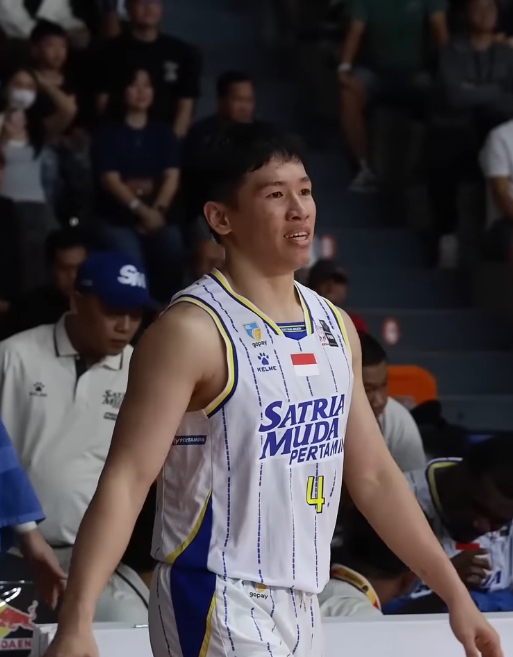
- Abraham with Satria Muda Bandung in 2026

No. 4 – Satria Muda Bandung
- Position: Point guard / shooting guard
- League: IBL

Personal information
- Born: 8 October 1995 (age 31) Pangkal Pinang, Indonesia
- Listed height: 180 cm (5 ft 11 in)
- Listed weight: 75 kg (165 lb)

Career information
- High school: Santo Yosef (Pangkal Pinang, Indonesia)
- College: Esa Unggul (2013-2015)
- Playing career: 2015–present

Career history
- 2015–2016: Stadium Jakarta
- 2016–2020: Aspac/Stapac Jakarta
- 2020-2021: Indonesia Patriots
- 2021-2022: Prawira Bandung
- 2023: Veltex Shizuoka
- 2023-present: Satria Muda Pertamina

Career highlights
- IBL champion (2019); 3× IBL Local Most Valuable Player (2020, 2022, 2024); 2× All-IBL Indonesian Second Team (2025, 2026); 7× All-IBL Indonesian First Team (2017–2022, 2024); IBL All-Indonesian Defensive Team (2022); IBL All-Star Local MVP (2022); 8× IBL All-Star (2017–2020, 2022, 2024-2026); IBL Sixthman of the Year (2019); IBL Most Improved Player (2017); 1× IBL Three-point Contest champion (2025); LIMA Jakarta Conference MVP (2015)
Medals
Men's basketball
Representing Indonesia
SEABA Championship
Silver medal – second place	2017 Manila	Team
SEA Games
Gold medal – first place	2021 Vietnam	Team
Silver medal – second place	2017 Kuala Lumpur	Team
Bronze medal – third place	2025 Thailand	Team
2021 FIBA Asia Cup SEABA Pre-Qualifier
Gold medal – first place	2018 Nonthaburi	Team
Test Event Asian Games
Gold medal – first place	2018 Jakarta	Team

Abraham Damar Grahita (born October 8, 1995) known for his initials ADG, is an Indonesian professional basketball player that plays for Satria Muda Pertamina of the Indonesian Basketball League (IBL). Grahita was one of the few Indonesian player to play overseas (the other being Mario Wuysang), joining Veltex Shizuoka of the B.League in 2023. And he also became the first ever Indonesian player to receive his own signature shoes with the release of Ardiles x DBL called AD1.

== Early career ==
Grahita was born in Pangkal Pinang, the capital and largest city of Bangka Belitung Islands located at the southeastern coasts of the island of Sumatra. He excelled at the sport of basketball throughout his high school years. However, he did not receive much exposure due to living at the rural area of Indonesia. After much supports and help from his friends, coach and family, Grahita decided to venture to Jakarta to find better competition and to pursue a career in basketball. His coach eventually managed to recommend Grahita to Stadium Jakarta, a professional team that participated in Indonesia's professional basketball league, IBL. Through Stadium, Grahita was given a scholarship to study at Esa Unggul University and also joined the school's basketball team where he played until turning professional in 2015. During this time, he also practiced with Stadium and even played in one of the pre-season game where he scored 18 points and grabbed 6 rebounds.

== Professional career ==
He played in a variety of professional places, which includes: Stadium Jakarta (2015–16), Stapac Jakarta (2016–2019), Indonesia Patriots (2020), Prawira Bandung (2021–present). He wasn't able to be part of the 2021 FIBA Asia Cup qualifiers

== Career statistics ==
Legend
GP	Games played	GS	Games started	MPG	Minutes per game
FG%	Field goal percentage	3P%	3-point field goal percentage	FT%	Free throw percentage
RPG	Rebounds per game	APG	Assists per game	SPG	Steals per game
BPG	Blocks per game	PPG	Points per game	**Bold**	Career high

†	Denotes seasons in which Grahita won an IBL championship
*	Led the league

=== IBL ===
==== Regular season ====
Years	Teams	GP	Min	FG%	3P%	FT%	APG	RPG	SPG	BPG	PPG
2015-16	Stadium Jakarta	**28**	16.3	36.0	25.0	68.0	1.0	2.7	1.2	**0.2**	6.8
2016-17	Aspac Jakarta	13	23.3	43.0	**42.0**	71.0	1.3	3.6	1.5	0.1	12.2
2017-18	Stapac Jakarta	15	20.6	33.0	30.0	50.0	1.7	3.3	1.1	0.1	8.2
2018-19	Stapac Jakarta	16	20.6	36.0	34.0	73.0	**3.3**	2.7	1.0	0.0	9.4
2019-20	Indonesia Patriots	11	26.8	45.2	33.9	**83.1**	2.8	3.6	**1.7**	0.0	13.6
2020-21	Prawira Bandung	16	27.3	**45.6**	34.1	66.9	3.1	**5.3**	0.8	0.1	**15.8**
2021-22	Prawira Bandung	21	**29.9**	44.9	38.4	77.3	2.9	4.5	1.2	**0.2**	14.4

==== Playoffs ====
Years	Teams	GP	Min	FG%	3P%	FT%	APG	RPG	SPG	BPG	PPG
2016	Stadium Jakarta	2	26.4	20.0	0.0	**83.0**	1.0	1.5	0.5	0.0	5.5
2017	Aspac Jakarta	4	21.0	30.0	20.0	50.0	1.5	2.7	1.0	0.2	5.2
2018	Stapac Jakarta	4	21.9	32.0	20.0	62.0	2.0	5.2	1.0	0.2	7.7
2019	Stapac Jakarta	4	19.0	36.0	21.0	75.0	**3.7**	2.7	**1.5**	0.0	6.0
2021	Prawira Bandung	3	32.3	37.5	34.6	71.4	1.6	**5.6**	1.3	**0.3**	**21.3**
2022	Prawira Bandung	**5**	**33.7**	**43.0**	**40.0**	50.0	2.8	2.4	1.0	0.2	15.6

=== International ===
Year	Competition	GP	Min	FG%	3P%	FT%	APG	RPG	SPG	BPG	PPG
2014	**2014 ASEAN University Games**	5	0.0	0.0	0.0	0.0	0.0	0.0	0.0	0.0	0.0
2016	**2016 ASEAN University Games**	5	0.0	0.0	0.0	0.0	0.0	0.0	0.0	0.0	0.0
2018	Test Event Asian Games 2018	4	0.0	0.0	0.0	0.0	0.0	0.0	0.0	0.0	0.0
Career		14.0	0.0	0.0	0.0	0.0	0.0	0.0	0.0	0.0	0.0
