= NSH Mountain Gold Timika =

Indonesian Basketball League team in Timika, Indonesia

Mountain Gold Timika
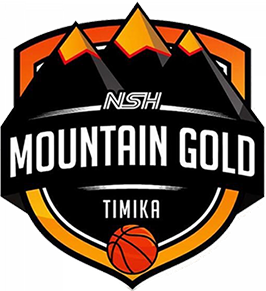
- Leagues: NBL/IBL; 2011–2023
- Founded: 1994
- Folded: 2023
- History: NSH GMC Jakarta (1994–2015); NSH Jakarta (2015–2020); NSH Mountain Gold Timika (2020–2023); Mountain Gold Timika (2023)
- Location: Timika, Papua
- Team colours: Black, White, Yellow, Orange
- General manager: Ronaldo Omaleng
- Team manager: Yusuf Arlan Ruslim (Arlan)
- Head coach: Antonius Rinaldo
- Championships: 0
- Website: https://iblindonesia.com/profile/team
Home	Away	Third

Mountain Gold Timika is a professional basketball team based in Timika, Papua, Indonesia. NSH Mountain Gold Timika is the first team from Papua to join in the IBL Indonesia. Mountain Gold originally signed up as a new team for 2020 season's competition. However, the new team slot was only available for two teams (Bali United & West Bandits), so Mountain Gold decided to merge with NSH Jakarta. NSH Mountain Gold has 3 native Papuan players, one of which is a player from the Amungme tribe usually known as Amungme people or Suku Amungme where it is one of the tribes in the Jayawijaya Mountains.

== History ==
=== 1994–2015: NSH GMC ===
In 1994, the youths who lived in the ex-Gaya Motor Cilincing sports complex became the initiators for the establishment of a basketball club. They gave the name GMC which stands for Gaya Motor Club. The great enthusiasm shown by the youths touched Na Sioe Hauw's heart. A tin entrepreneur who was finally willing to fund the club. This collaboration resulted in a new club name used to participate in the competition, namely NSH GMC.

NSH GMC's achievements are satisfactory at the amateur level. In 2007, they won the Division II competition in DKI Jakarta. NSH GMC also received a promotion to Division I DKI Jakarta. In the following year, they were able to be in the second place at DKI Jakarta Division I competition and third in the National Championship Division I.

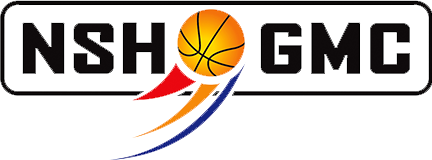
NSH GMC Logo in 1994

This success made NSH GMC promoted to Kobatama (Main Division Basketball Competition). As a result, they occupied seventh position. In 2010, they competed in PBL (Premiere Basketball League) in which they were finished sixth.

NSH GMC then participated in the Indonesian professional league in 2011. They joined NBL Indonesia (currently Indonesian Basketball League together with Pacific Caesar Surabaya in 2011–2012 Season. They used the name NSH GMC Riau. NSH has been consistently joined the Indonesian professional league to be shown until NBL was replaced by IBL. From there, NSH began to find its turning point in the team's achievements projected as Numbers of sponsors has approached NSH and it shown as well that NSH has been adjusting its logos in the following years.

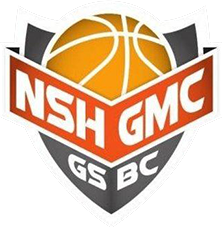
NSH GMC GSBC in 2014

=== 2015–2019: NSH Jakarta ===
Starting from Maykel S.D. Ferdinandus (Coach Inyo) who succeeded in bringing NSH to enliven the 2016–2017 IBL playoff competition. Unfortunately, after that he resigned for the following season. But his successor, Wahyu Widayat Jati, managed to bring change for NSH for two consecutive seasons. At its upward record of 2018–2020 IBL, NSH has won the Regular Season brought NHS to the playoffs season 2017–2018 Regular Season. Although in the end, NSH had to knocked out 1–2 in the semifinals against Satria Muda Pertamina Jakarta. in the following Season NSH Jakarta technically won regular season however due to Indonesian Patriots was not qualified to continue to the next round. NSH appeared short in the 2020 Preliminary Round.

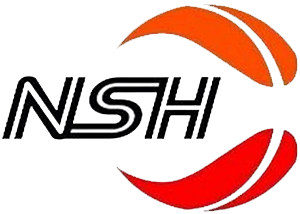
NSH Jakarta in 2015

=== 2020–2023: Mountain Gold Timika ===
During off-season, Papuan newly team from Timika – Mountain Gold has acquired NSH Jakarta and changed its name to NSH Mountain Gold Timika. NSH Mountain Gold Timika became the first team from the east of Indonesia who joined the national competition Indonesian Basketball League for the first time in the history. Its license however was revoked by IBL in 2023 due to the club's internal problems.

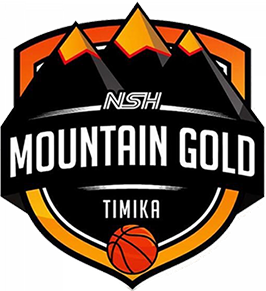
NSH Mountain Gold Timika logo in 2020

== Head coach ==
- Mayckel S.D Ferdinandus (2011–2017)
- Wahyu Widayat Jati (2017–2019)
- Antonius Rinaldo (2019-Present)

== Final roster ==
Mountain Gold Timika roster
Players
Coaches

Pos.	No.	Nat.	Name	Ht.	Wt.
F	30	(Indonesia)	Brando Oktavianus Kosegeran	1.86 m (6 ft 1 in)	80 kg (176 lb)
SG	6	(Indonesia)	William Beckham Mamahit	1.82 m (6 ft 0 in)	76 kg (168 lb)
F	16	(Indonesia)	Randi Marcellino	1.88 m (6 ft 2 in)	84 kg (185 lb)
C	12	(Lebanon) (United States)	Jarrid Famous	2.09 m (6 ft 10 in)	99 kg (218 lb)
SF	27	(Indonesia)	Jerriel Rhemady	1.81 m (5 ft 11 in)	75 kg (165 lb)
PG	2	(Indonesia)	Luis Jovan Golung	1.76 m (5 ft 9 in)	80 kg (176 lb)
F	10	(Indonesia)	Rizky Effendi	1.84 m (6 ft 0 in)	85 kg (187 lb)
G	11	(Indonesia)	Andre Rorimpandey	1.77 m (5 ft 10 in)	70 kg (154 lb)
C	28	(Indonesia)	Melki Sedek Basik Basik	1.96 m (6 ft 5 in)	90 kg (198 lb)
PF	21	(Indonesia)	Vincent Sanjaya	1.93 m (6 ft 4 in)	90 kg (198 lb)
F	22	(Indonesia)	Muhammad Yugie	1.88 m (6 ft 2 in)	74 kg (163 lb)
F/C	34	(Indonesia)	Ruslan Ruslan	1.97 m (6 ft 6 in)	88 kg (194 lb)
F	35	(Indonesia)	Melkias Moso Kaize	1.89 m (6 ft 2 in)	87 kg (192 lb)
F	29	(Indonesia)	Hengki Infandi	1.80 m (5 ft 11 in)	74 kg (163 lb)
F	70	(Indonesia)	Fachrul Asyam	1.85 m (6 ft 1 in)	95 kg (209 lb)

Head coach

- (Indonesia) Antonius Rinaldo

Assistant coach(es)

- (Indonesia) Antonius Endratmo
- (Indonesia) Agus Batbual
- (Indonesia) Ruspin Gultom

Legend

- (C) Team captain
- Injured

Roster= https://iblindonesia.com/profile/team/126044

== Individual awards ==
Title	2020	2019	2018	2017
Best Coach	Antonius Ferry Rinaldo			
The Best Foreign Player	Mike Glover	—	—	Gary Jacobs Jr

== Notable players ==
- Set a club record or won an individual award as a professional player
- Played at least one official international match for his senior national team at any time.
- (Indonesia) Tri Hartanto
- (United States) Shavar Newkirk
- (Lebanon) Jarrid Famous
- (Indonesia) Ebrahim Enguio Lopez
- (United States) Mike Glover
