= Stadium Jakarta =

Stadium Happy8 Jakarta
- Leagues: NBL/IBL (2003–2017)
- Founded: 1994
- Dissolved: 2017 (merger with Aspac Jakarta)
- History: Stadium Jakarta (2003–2014); Stadium Happy8 Jakarta (2014–2017)
- Location: Jakarta, Indonesia
- Team colours: Red, White, Blue, Black
Away

Stadium Jakarta was a basketball club based in Jakarta, Indonesia that played in the Indonesian Basketball League (IBL). The club reached IBL/NBL semifinals twice in the 2013 season and the 2015 season. The club last competed in the 2016 IBL season.

After the club's last season, there were persistent rumor of a merger between Stadium and Aspac for the 2017 IBL season. At the beginning of the new season, the rumor turned out to be false as Aspac and Stadium were just increasing their cooperation with many Stadium players joined Aspac that season. However, Stadium did not compete in the league that season to avoid sanction from the IBL.

The merger did go ahead before the 2018–19 IBL season, merging both clubs into Stapac Jakarta.

== 2015/16 final roster ==
Stadium Jakarta roster
Players
Coaches

Pos.	No.	Nat.	Name	Ht.	Wt.
SF	24	(Indonesia)	Abraham Damar Grahita	1.80 m (5 ft 11 in)	75 kg (165 lb)
PF	63	(Indonesia)	Pringgo Regowo	1.90 m (6 ft 3 in)	96 kg (212 lb)
PF	31	(Indonesia)	Hardian Wicaksono	1.88 m (6 ft 2 in)	93 kg (205 lb)
C	23	(Indonesia)	Ruslan Ruslan	1.97 m (6 ft 6 in)	89 kg (196 lb)
C	0	(Indonesia)	Valentino Wuwungan	1.92 m (6 ft 4 in)	89 kg (196 lb)
SF	22	(Indonesia)	Raymond Shariputra	1.81 m (5 ft 11 in)	88 kg (194 lb)
SF	2	(Indonesia)	Merio Ferdiansyah	1.80 m (5 ft 11 in)	85 kg (187 lb)
PG	9	(Indonesia)	Jeremiah Ranti	1.77 m (5 ft 10 in)	90 kg (198 lb)
SF	29	(Indonesia)	Rizki Amrullah	1.83 m (6 ft 0 in)	90 kg (198 lb)
F	8	(Indonesia)	Wijaya Saputra	1.84 m (6 ft 0 in)	85 kg (187 lb)
SF	6	(Indonesia)	Anton Sujarwo	1.86 m (6 ft 1 in)	84 kg (185 lb)
G	16	(Indonesia)	I.G.N Teguh Putra Negara	1.89 m (6 ft 2 in)	88 kg (194 lb)
SG	20	(Indonesia)	Saleh Afriatna	1.80 m (5 ft 11 in)	93 kg (205 lb)
PG	13	(Indonesia)	Fanny Budianto	1.70 m (5 ft 7 in)	83 kg (183 lb)
PG	4	(Indonesia)	Bayu Anggara	1.74 m (5 ft 9 in)	90 kg (198 lb)
C	7	(Indonesia)	Giulio Putra Sianturi	2.05 m (6 ft 9 in)
PF	17	(Indonesia)	Michael John Dagatan

Head coach

- (Indonesia) Andre Yuwadi

Assistant coach(es)

Legend

- (C) Team captain
- Injured

- Roster
Updated: 23 July 2023,
