= Prawira Bandung =

Prawira Harum Bandung
- 2025 IBL Indonesia
- Leagues: Kobatama; 1994–2002; IBL/NBL; 2003–2025
- Founded: 1991
- Dissolved: 2025
- History: List: Hadtex Indosyntec Basket Ball Club (1991-1995) Panasia Indosyntec (1995-2003) Panasia Senatama (2003-2004) Garuda Panasia (2004-2006) Garuda Bandung (2006-2009) Garuda "Flexi" Bandung (2009-2010) Garuda "Speedy" Bandung (2010-2012) Garuda "Kukar" Bandung (2012-2015) Bank BJB Garuda Bandung (2015-2018) Prawira Bandung (2018-2022) Prawira Harum Bandung (2022-2025)
- Arena: GOR C-Tra Arena
- Capacity: 5,000
- Location: Bandung, West Java, Indonesia
- Team colors: Blue, White, Yellow
- General manager: Adhitia Putra Herawan
- Team manager: Andri Syarel Octreanes
- Head coach: (United States) David Singleton
- Ownership: PT Persib Bandung Bermartabat
- Affiliation: Persib Bandung
- Championships: Kobatama: 3 (1994, 1997, 1998); IBL: 1 (2023)
- Website: prawirabandung.com
Home	Away	Third

Prawira Harum Bandung was an Indonesian professional basketball club based in the city of Bandung, West Java province. It was founded by Lilian Wijaya in 1991 as Hadtex Indosyntec. Facing financial issues over the last month, on August 4, 2025, Prawira merged with Satria Muda Pertamina.

The club was a member of the Perbasi's top division from 1994 to 2002 and has played in the Indonesian Basketball League (IBL) since 2003. They won championships in 1994, 1997, 1998, and the IBL in 2023.

== History ==
According to the official club website, Garuda Bandung was founded in 1991 by Lilian Wijaya, and carried the name Hadtex Indosyntec. The project was a brainchild of the Board of Directors of PT Hadtex Indosyntec. In 1994 Hadtex Indosyntec joined the KOBATAMA, and they changed its name into Panasia Indosyntec in 1996. The club subsequently went into sponsorship changes. In 2004, the club was renamed Senatama Garuda Panasia, and in 2007, under new management, the club rechristened itself as Garuda Panasia Bandung. In 2008, it's sponsored by Telkom Indonesia and renamed Garuda Flexi Bandung.

Garuda Bandung reach the finals since 1994. From the 7 final stages, Garuda get the champions in 1994 (as Hadtex Indosyntec), 1997, and 1998 (as Panasia Indosyntec), and Garuda get the runner-ups in 1995, 1996, 2000 (lose to Aspac Jakarta), and 2008 (lose to Satria Muda).

PT Persib Bandung Bermartabat (PBB) bought Garuda Bandung in 2018 and changed the club's name into Prawira Bandung.

In 2023 Prawira Harum Bandung succeeded in becoming champions of the Indonesian Basketball League by defeating Pelita Jaya Bakrie Jakarta.

== Head coaches ==
Coach	Seasons	W	L	Positions	Play-off	W	L
Fictor Gideon Roring	2016	22	11	5th Place	First Round	0	2
Andre Yuwadi	2017	7	7	3rd Place White Group	First Round	1	2
Andre Yuwadi	2018	9	8	2nd Place Red Division	First Round	1	2
Giedrius Žibėnas	2019	3	1	2nd Place Red Division	Semifinals	0	1
Andre Yuwadi	2021	16	6	2nd Place White Division	First Round	1	2
David Singleton	2022	18	4	2nd Place White Division	Semifinals	0	2
David Singleton	2023	27	3	1st Place Regular Season	Finals	2	0

== Ownerships and fanbase ==
Prawira Bandung was founded in 1991 by Lilian Wijaya. Now it is owned by PT Persib Bandung Bermartabat.

== Former roster (2025) ==
Prawira Harum Bandung roster
Players
Coaches

Pos.	No.	Nat.	Name	Ht.	Wt.
G	0	(Indonesia)	Arlan Alexander Sisnowidono Sitorus (R)	1.75 m (5 ft 9 in)	73 kg (161 lb)
G	1	(Indonesia)	Jacob Emilio Lobbu	1.75 m (5 ft 9 in)	71 kg (157 lb)
G	2	(Indonesia)	Sulthan Fauzan	1.87 m (6 ft 2 in)	73 kg (161 lb)
G/F	6	(Indonesia)	Refka Djalu Pangestu	1.84 m (6 ft 0 in)	80 kg (176 lb)
G	6	(United States)	Brandis Raley-Ross	1.91 m (6 ft 3 in)	91 kg (201 lb)
F	7	(Indonesia)	David Nuban	1.86 m (6 ft 1 in)	85 kg (187 lb)
G	8	(Indonesia)	Yudha Saputera (C)	1.76 m (5 ft 9 in)	70 kg (154 lb)
G	9	(Indonesia)	Sandy Febriansyakh	1.90 m (6 ft 3 in)	74 kg (163 lb)
F	11	(Indonesia)	Teddy Apriyana Romadonsyah	1.90 m (6 ft 3 in)	85 kg (187 lb)
C	12	(Lithuania)	Norbertas Giga	2.08 m (6 ft 10 in)	103 kg (227 lb)
C	15	(Indonesia)	Fabio Matheus Mailangkay	1.95 m (6 ft 5 in)	85 kg (187 lb)
F/C	27	(Indonesia)	Kelvin Sanjaya	2.00 m (6 ft 7 in)	95 kg (209 lb)
F/C	34	(Indonesia)	Pandu Wiguna	1.95 m (6 ft 5 in)	78 kg (172 lb)
F	71	(Indonesia) (United States)	Jamarr Johnson (HP)	1.96 m (6 ft 5 in)	95 kg (209 lb)
F	77	(Indonesia)	Muhammad Fhirdan Guntara	1.84 m (6 ft 0 in)	80 kg (176 lb)
F	99	(United States)	DeVaughn Washington	2.03 m (6 ft 8 in)	96 kg (212 lb)

Head coach

- (United States) David Singleton

Assistant coach(es)

- (Indonesia) Andri Malay
- (Indonesia) Nico Donnda Fitzgerald

Strength & conditioning coach(es)

- (United States) Basir Ali Ismail

Legend

- (C) Team captain
- (HP) Heritage player
- (R) Rookie
- Injured

- Roster
Updated: 2023-01-11

== Notable players ==
=== Players ===
- Set a club record or won an individual award as a professional player.
- Played at least one official international match for his senior national team at any time.

- (Indonesia) I Made Sudiadnyana
- (Indonesia) Johannis Winar
- (Indonesia) Thomas Thedy Kurniady
- (Indonesia) Abraham Damar Grahita
- (Indonesia) Muhammad Reza Guntara
- (Indonesia) Denny Sumargo
- (Indonesia) Kelly Purwanto
- (United States) Jarred Shaw
- (Dominican Republic) Brandone Francis
- (Indonesia) Teddy Apriyana Romadonsyah
- (Indonesia) Surliyadin
- (Indonesia) Daniel Wenas
- (Indonesia) Mario Wuysang
- (Indonesia) Firman Dwi Nugroho
- (Indonesia) Diftha Pratama
- (United States) Dane Miller Jr.
- (United States) James Gist
- (Indonesia) Jamarr Johnson
- (Lithuania) Norbertas Giga
- (Indonesia) Yudha Saputera
- (United States) Brandis Raley-Ross
- (Lithuania) Julius Jucikas

=== Coaches ===
- Set a club record or won an individual award as a professional coach.
- Functioned as head coach for any senior national team at least once at an official international match.

- (Indonesia) Johannis Winar
- (United States) David Singleton
