= IBL Rookie of the Year =

Basketball award

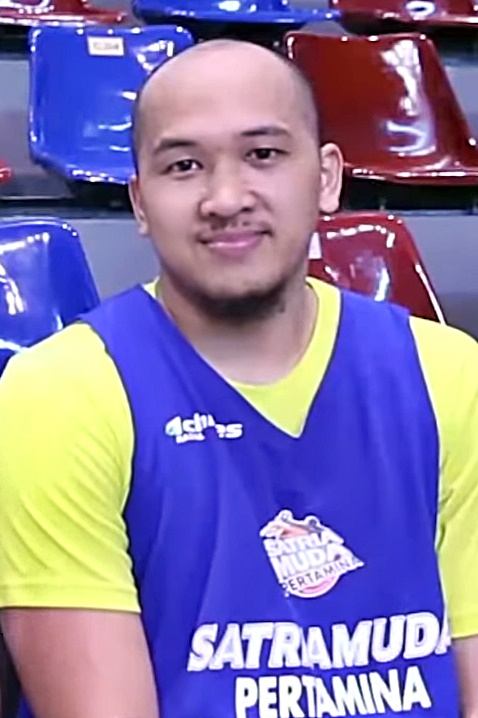
Arki Wisnu won the award in 2012, and won the Finals MVP in that same year.

The IBL Rookie of the Year Award is an annual Indonesian Basketball League award that is given to the best first season local player in the regular IBL season.

== Winners ==
Season	Name	Club	Source
2003	(Indonesia) Mario Wuysang	Aspac Jakarta	
2005	(Indonesia) Dimas Dewanto	Avian Bima Sakti	
2011	(Indonesia) Valentino Wuwungan	Satya Wacana Salatiga	
2012	(Indonesia) Arki Dikania Wisnu	Satria Muda Pertamina Jakarta	
2013	(Indonesia) Andakara Prastawa	Aspac Jakarta	
2014	(Philippines) (Indonesia) Ebrahim Enguio Lopez	Aspac Jakarta	
2015	(Indonesia) Kristian Liem	Aspac Jakarta	
2016	(United States) (Indonesia) Jamarr Andre Johnson	CLS Knights	
2017	(Indonesia) Juan Laurent	Satria Muda Pertamina Jakarta	
2018	(Indonesia) Abraham Wenas	Amartha Hangtuah	
2019	(Indonesia) Agassi Goantara	Stapac Jakarta	
2020	(Indonesia) Rivaldo Tandra Panghestio	Satria Muda Pertamina Jakarta	
2021	(Indonesia) Samuel Devin Susanto	Bima Perkasa Jogja	
2022	(Indonesia) Yudha Saputera	Prawira Harum Bandung	
2023	(Indonesia) Aven Ryan Pratama	Elang Pacific Caesar	
2024	(Indonesia) Radithyo Wibowo	Dewa United Banten	
2025	(Indonesia) Sahid Kasim	Hangtuah Jakarta	
2026	(Indonesia) Henry Sualang	Satya Wacana Salatiga	

== See also ==
- IBL Foreign Player of the Year
- All-IBL Indonesian Team
