= Kristian Liem =

Indonesian basketball player

No. 99 – Dewa United Banten
- Position: Center
- League: IBL

Personal information
- Born: 10 September 1994 (age 32) Madiun, Indonesia
- Listed height: 201 cm (6 ft 7 in)
- Listed weight: 94 kg (207 lb)

Career information
- College: UPH
- Playing career: 2014–present

Career history
- 2014-2018: Stapac Jakarta
- 2018-2021: Satria Muda Pertamina
- 2021-present: Dewa United

Career highlights
- 2× IBL champion (2021, 2025); IBL Rookie of the Year (2015); 2× LIMA champion (2013, 2014)
Medals
Men's basketball
Representing Indonesia
SEABA Under-18 Championship
| Silver medal – second place | 2012 Singapore | Team |

Kristianto Liem (born September 10, 1994) is an Indonesian professional basketball player for the Dewa United Banten of the Indonesian Basketball League (IBL). He played college basketball for the UPH Eagles.

== Professional career ==
Liem won the Rookie of the Year award in 2015 with averages of 4.4 points per game and 4.5 rebounds per game.

Liem was supposed to join Satria Muda Pertamina for the 2018–19 season, but was unable to due to an achilles tendon rupture.

== National team career ==
Liem represented the Indonesia national basketball team in the 2012 SEABA Under-18 Championship, winning the silver medal.

== Personal life ==
Liem is the cousin of Pelita Jaya Bakrie player Vincent Rivaldi Kosasih. He was teammates with Kosasih from 2016 to 2018 while with Aspac Jakarta.
