= 2024 FIBA Men's Olympic Qualifying Tournaments – San Juan =

2024 FIBA World Olympic Qualifying Tournament for Men
Tournament details
- Host country: Puerto Rico
- City: San Juan
- Dates: 2–7 July
- Teams: 6
- Venue(s): 1 (in 1 host city)

Final positions
- Champions: Puerto Rico
- Runners-up: Lithuania
- Third place: Italy
- Fourth place: Mexico

Tournament statistics
- Games played: 9
- Attendance: 64,592 (7,177 per game)
- MVP: (Puerto Rico) Jose Alvarado
- Top scorer: (Lithuania) Marius Grigonis (17.5 ppg)

Official website
- Website

The 2024 FIBA Men's Olympic Qualifying Tournament in San Juan was one of four 2024 FIBA Men's Olympic Qualifying Tournaments. The tournament was held at San Juan, Puerto Rico, from 2 to 7 July 2024. Six teams participated in two groups of three teams, where the first-and second-placed teams qualified for the semifinals. The winner of the tournament advanced to the 2024 Summer Olympics.

Puerto Rico won the tournament after defeating Lithuania in the final.

== Teams ==
Team	Qualification	Date of qualification	WR
Lithuania	One of top 16 eligible teams	10 September 2023	10
Italy	One of top 16 eligible teams	10 September 2023	13
Puerto Rico	Highest-ranked eligible team – Americas	10 September 2023	16
Mexico	One of top 16 eligible teams	10 September 2023	25
Ivory Coast	One of top 16 eligible teams	10 September 2023	31
Bahrain	Winner of 2024 Asian Pre-Qualifying Tournament	20 August 2023	67

== Venue ==
San Juan	2024 FIBA Men's Olympic Qualifying Tournaments – San Juan (Puerto Rico)
José Miguel Agrelot Coliseum	2024 FIBA Men's Olympic Qualifying Tournaments – San Juan (Puerto Rico)
Capacity: 18,500	2024 FIBA Men's Olympic Qualifying Tournaments – San Juan (Puerto Rico)

== Preliminary round ==
All times are local (UTC−4).

=== Group A ===
Pos	Team	Pld	W	L	PF	PA	PD	Pts	Qualification
1	Lithuania	2	2	0	193	177	+16	4	Semi-finals
2	Mexico	2	1	1	176	177	−1	3	Semi-finals
3	Ivory Coast	2	0	2	174	189	−15	2	

Source: FIBA

2 July 2024
20:30

Boxscore

Mexico	84–96	Lithuania
Scoring by quarter: 26–29, 18–20, 17–34, 23–13
Pts: Ibarra 18; Rebs: Girón, Ibarra 6 Asts: Stoll 12		Pts: Grigonis 21; Rebs: Sabonis 11; Asts: Jokubaitis 6

José Miguel Agrelot Coliseum, San Juan
Attendance: 2,485
Referees: Antonio Conde (ESP), Andrés Bartel (URU), Kristian Páez (ECU)

3 July 2024
17:30

Boxscore

Lithuania	97–93	Ivory Coast
Scoring by quarter: 24–18, 23–24, 18–30, 32–21
Pts: Sabonis 22; Rebs: Sabonis 9 Asts: Grigonis 7		Pts: Thompson 18; Rebs: Kouadio, Moularé 5 Asts: Moularé 7

José Miguel Agrelot Coliseum, San Juan
Attendance: 3,227
Referees: Yohan Rosso (FRA), Rabah Noujaim (LBN), James Boyer (AUS)

4 July 2024
17:30

Boxscore

Ivory Coast	81–92	Mexico
Scoring by quarter: 25–22, 21–22, 23–24, 12–24
Pts: Fofana, Zouzoua 16; Rebs: Fofana, Thompson 8 Asts: Diabate 6		Pts: Stoll 23; Rebs: Jaimes 12; Asts: Stoll 11

José Miguel Agrelot Coliseum, San Juan
Attendance: 3,758
Referees: Antonio Conde (ESP), Kristian Páez (ECU), Péter Praksch (HUN)

=== Group B ===
Pos	Team	Pld	W	L	PF	PA	PD	Pts	Qualification
1	Puerto Rico (H)	2	2	0	179	125	+54	4	Semi-finals
2	Italy	2	1	1	183	133	+50	3	Semi-finals
3	Bahrain	2	0	2	109	213	−104	2	

Source: FIBA
(H) Hosts

2 July 2024
17:30

Boxscore

Italy	114–53	Bahrain
Scoring by quarter: 19–9, 28–16, 29–17, 38–11
Pts: Melli, Gallinari 14; Rebs: Polonara 8 Asts: Spissu 7		Pts: Haji 12; Rebs: three players 3 Asts: M. Hamoda, Z. Hamoda 3

José Miguel Agrelot Coliseum, San Juan
Attendance: 1,560
Referees: Yohan Rosso (FRA), Carlos Peralta (ECU), Rabah Noujaim (LBN)

3 July 2024
20:30

Boxscore

Bahrain	56–99	Puerto Rico
Scoring by quarter: 4–19, 15–20, 23–31, 14–29
Pts: Z. Hamooda 15; Rebs: Chism 7 Asts: Haji, Melad 3		Pts: Thompson 20; Rebs: Toro 12; Asts: Alvarado 6

José Miguel Agrelot Coliseum, San Juan
Attendance: 10,043
Referees: Antonio Conde (ESP), Andrés Bartel (URU), Péter Praksch (HUN)

4 July 2024
20:30

Boxscore

Puerto Rico	80–69	Italy
Scoring by quarter: 15–14, 20–26, 22–17, 23–12
Pts: Alvarado 29; Rebs: Ortiz 8 Asts: Waters 12		Pts: Gallinari 14; Rebs: Melli 11; Asts: Spissu 5

José Miguel Agrelot Coliseum, San Juan
Attendance: 12,519
Referees: Yohan Rosso (FRA), Andrés Bartel (URU), Carlos Peralta (ECU)

== Final round ==
Semi-finals
6 July
Italy	64
Lithuania	88
6 July
Puerto Rico	98
Mexico	78

Final
7 July
Lithuania	68
Puerto Rico	79

=== Semi-finals ===
6 July 2024
16:00

Boxscore

Italy	64–88	Lithuania
Scoring by quarter: 21–25, 17–22, 15–21, 11–20
Pts: Gallinari 15; Rebs: Melli 4 Asts: Tonut 7		Pts: Grigonis 23; Rebs: Butkevičius, Sabonis 8 Asts: Jokubaitis, Sabonis 4

José Miguel Agrelot Coliseum, San Juan
Attendance: 4,766
Referees: Antonio Conde (ESP), Péter Praksch (HUN), James Boyer (AUS)

6 July 2024
19:00

Boxscore

Puerto Rico	98–78	Mexico
Scoring by quarter: 20–25, 27–14, 30–20, 21–19
Pts: Waters 24; Rebs: Toro 9 Asts: Waters 4		Pts: Jaimes 23; Rebs: Jaimes 13; Asts: Stoll 8

José Miguel Agrelot Coliseum, San Juan
Attendance: 12,730
Referees: Yohan Rosso (FRA), Andrés Bartel (URU), Carlos Peralta (ECU)

=== Final ===
7 July 2024
18:00

Boxscore

Lithuania	68–79	Puerto Rico
Scoring by quarter: 19–19, 16–20, 15–23, 18–17
Pts: Jokubaitis 16; Rebs: Sabonis 9 Asts: Grigonis 6		Pts: Alvarado 23; Rebs: Alvarado, Ortiz 6 Asts: Conditt 4

José Miguel Agrelot Coliseum, San Juan
Attendance: 13,504
Referees: Antonio Conde (ESP), Yohan Rosso (FRA), Andrés Bartel (URU)

== Final ranking ==
Pos	Team	Pld	W	L	Qualification
1	Puerto Rico	4	4	0	Qualified for the Olympics
2	Lithuania	4	3	1	
3	Italy	3	1	2	
4	Mexico	3	1	2	
5	Ivory Coast	2	0	2	
6	Bahrain	2	0	2	

Source: FIBA

== Statistics and awards ==
=== Statistical leaders ===
Players

Points

Name	PPG
(Lithuania) Marius Grigonis	17.5
(Mexico) Fabián Jaimes	17.0
(Mexico) Joshua Ibarra	16.0
(Puerto Rico) Jose Alvarado	16.0
(Puerto Rico) Tremont Waters	15.3

Rebounds

Name	RPG
(Lithuania) Domantas Sabonis	9.3
(Mexico) Joshua Ibarra	9.3
(Mexico) Fabián Jaimes	9.3
(Italy) Nicolò Melli	7.0
(Puerto Rico) Arnaldo Toro Barea	6.5

Assists

Name	APG
(Mexico) Paul Stoll	10.3
(Ivory Coast) Assémian Moularé	5.5
(Puerto Rico) Tremont Waters	5.5
(Italy) Marco Spissu	4.7
(Italy) Nico Mannion	4.0
(Lithuania) Rokas Jokubaitis	4.0

Blocks

Name	BPG
(Ivory Coast) Lionel Kouadio	1.5
(Mexico) Karim Rodriguez	1.3
(Mexico) Joshua Ibarra	1.3
(Ivory Coast) Vafessa Fofana	1.0
(Lithuania) Domantas Sabonis	0.8
(Puerto Rico) Arnaldo Toro Barea	0.8

Steals

Name	SPG
(Ivory Coast) Lionel Kouadio	4.0
(Puerto Rico) Jose Alvarado	2.3
(Bahrain) Ali Hasan	2.0
(Italy) Marco Spissu	2.0
(Lithuania) Edgaras Ulanovas	1.8

Efficiency

Name	EFFPG
(Mexico) Joshua Ibarra	21.0
(Mexico) Fabián Jaimes	21.0
(Mexico) Paul Stoll	17.7
(Lithuania) Marius Grigonis	17.5
(Lithuania) Domantas Sabonis	17.0

==== Teams ====
Points

Team	PPG
Puerto Rico	89.0
Lithuania	87.3
Ivory Coast	87.0
Mexico	84.7
Italy	82.3

Rebounds

Team	RPG
Mexico	40.7
Puerto Rico	40.5
Lithuania	36.5
Italy	33.3
Ivory Coast	32.0

Assists

Team	APG
Italy	27.0
Mexico	22.3
Lithuania	21.3
Ivory Coast	17.5
Puerto Rico	16.5

Blocks

Team	BPG
Mexico	3.3
Puerto Rico	2.8
Ivory Coast	2.5
Italy	2.0
Bahrain	1.5
Lithuania	1.5

Steals

Team	SPG
Italy	11.7
Ivory Coast	10.5
Lithuania	8.0
Puerto Rico	7.8
Mexico	7.7

Efficiency

Team	EFFPG
Italy	106.7
Lithuania	104.8
Puerto Rico	104.0
Mexico	100.7
Ivory Coast	88.5

=== Awards ===
The all star-team and MVP were announced on 7 July 2024.

All-Star Team
Guards	Forwards	Centers
(Puerto Rico) Tremont Waters (Puerto Rico) Jose Alvarado	(Italy) Danilo Gallinari (Lithuania) Marius Grigonis	(Mexico) Joshua Ibarra
MVP: (Puerto Rico) Jose Alvarado
