= Kelly Purwanto =

Indonesian basketball player (born 1983)

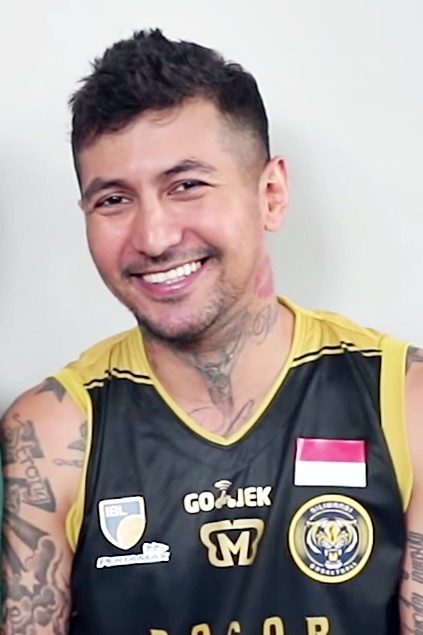
- Purwanto in 2019

Personal information
- Born: August 3, 1983 (age 43) Jakarta, Indonesia
- Listed height: 178 cm (5 ft 10 in)
- Listed weight: 76 kg (168 lb)

Career information
- High school: SMAK 1 Bina Bakti (Bandung, Indonesia)
- College: Perbanas Institute (2001-2005)
- Playing career: 2003–2024
- Position: Point guard

Career history
- 2003-2005: Satria Muda BritAma
- 2005-2007: Pelita Jaya Esia
- 2007-2010: Garuda Flexi Bandung
- 2010-2016: Pelita Jaya Esia
- 2016-2018: Hangtuah Sumsel
- 2018-2019: Bogor Siliwangi
- 2019-2024: Amartha Hangtuah

Career highlights
- IBL Most Valuable Player (2006); 4× IBL All-Star (2005, 2019, 2020, 2023); 3× NBL Indonesia All-Star (2010-2012); All-NBL Indonesia First Team (2013); NBL Indonesia Top assist (2013); All-NBL Indonesia Second Team (2012); 2× NBL Indonesia Top steal (2012, 2015); 3× Libama champion (2002-2004)
Medals
Men's basketball
Representing Indonesia
Islamic Solidarity Games
| Bronze medal – third place | 2013 Palembang | Team |
SEABA Championship
| Silver medal – second place | 2009 Medan | Team |

Kelly Purwanto Ari Nugroho (born August 3, 1983) is a retired Indonesian professional basketball player who last played for the Amartha Hangtuah of the Indonesian Basketball League (IBL). He was also a member of the Indonesia national basketball team.

Purwanto competed for the Indonesia national basketball team at the FIBA Asia Championship 2009 for the first time.

He has a nephew, Radithyo Wibowo which is the youngest player in the league that plays for Dewa United Banten.
