= Dewa United Banten =

Dewa United Banten may refer to:

- Dewa United Banten F.C., a football club based in Serang Regency, Banten
- Dewa United Banten BC, a basketball club based in Tangerang, Banten
