= 2025 Indonesian Basketball League =

2025 IBL Gopay
- League: Indonesian Basketball League
- Sport: Basketball
- Duration: 11 January – 21 June 2025 (regular season); 26 June – 20 July 2025 (playoffs)
- Teams: 14
- TV partner: Nusantara TV
- Streaming partner: IBL TV via YouTube

Regular season
- Top seed: Pelita Jaya Jakarta
- Season MVP: Agassi Goantara(Local MVP); KJ McDaniels(League-wide)
- Top scorer: Quintin Dove

Cup
- Cup champions: Satria Muda Bandung (2nd title)
- Cup runners-up: Dewa United Banten
- Cup MVP: Abraham Damar Grahita

Playoffs
- Champions: Dewa United Banten (1st title)
- Runners-up: Pelita Jaya Jakarta
- Finals MVP: Joshua Ibarra

IBL Indonesia seasons
- ← 2024 2026 →

The 2025 Indonesian Basketball League (known as IBL Gopay for sponsorship reasons) was the tenth season of Indonesian top domestic basketball league, the Indonesian Basketball League, since the re-branding by Starting5. It was the 22nd IBL season overall since its establishment in 2003. The season began on 11 January and ended in July 2025 with two breaks, one from mid-February until mid-March due to FIBA Asia Cup qualifiers and the first week of Ramadan, and another break from late March until early April due to Eid al-Fitr. IBL All Indonesian was held from 16 to 31 August. Dewa United Banten won the final and Satria Muda Bandung won the cup this year with their players, Joshua Ibarra and Abraham Damar Grahita as the respective MVPs.

According to the league's CEO, Junas Miradiansyah, the rule changes that were implemented last season remain in effect this season without any changes.

== Teams ==
All 14 teams from the 2024 IBL season continued on in 2025. There were some changes to the competing teams.

=== Name changes ===
- Amartha Hangtuah changed its name to Hangtuah Jakarta and dropping the name Amartha from its name and logo.

=== Venues and locations ===
Most of the team kept their last season's venues. However, some teams changed their home venues for this season.

Locations of 2025 IBL teams.
Locations of Java-based 2025 IBL teams.

Team	Arena	Home city
Bali United Basketball	GOR Purna Krida	Badung, Bali
Bali United Basketball	GOR Merpati	Denpasar
Bima Perkasa Jogja	GOR Pancasila UGM	Yogyakarta
Borneo Hornbills	GOR Laga Tangkas	Cibinong, Bogor
Dewa United Banten	Dewa United Arena	Tangerang
Hangtuah Jakarta	GOR Universitas Negeri Jakarta (UNJ)	Jakarta
Hangtuah Jakarta	GOR Ciracas	Jakarta
Kesatria Bengawan Solo	Sritex Arena	Solo
Pacific Caesar Surabaya	GOR Pacific Caesar	Surabaya
Pelita Jaya Jakarta	Senayan Basketball Hall	Jakarta
Pelita Jaya Jakarta	GOR Soemantri Brodjonegoro	Jakarta
Prawira Harum Bandung	C-Tra Prawira Arena	Bandung
Rajawali Medan	GOR Universitas Medan	Medan
RANS Simba Bogor	Gymnasium Sekolah Vokasi IPB	Bogor
Satria Muda Pertamina	The BritAma Arena	Jakarta
Satya Wacana Saints Salatiga	GOR Basket Susilo Wibowo	Semarang
Tangerang Hawks	Indoor Stadium Sport Center	Tangerang

== Personnel and kits ==
Team	Manager	Head coach	Captain	Kit manufacturer
Bali United Basketball	(Indonesia) Sigit Sugiantoro	(Indonesia) I Gusti Rusta Wijaya	(United States) Xavier Cannefax	(Indonesia) Specs
Bima Perkasa Jogja	(Indonesia) Fadhil Driya Warastra	(Indonesia) Oleh Halim	(Indonesia) Restu Dwi Purnomo	(Indonesia) VNY
Borneo Hornbills	(Indonesia) Ridwan Eka Saputra	(Indonesia) Ismael Tan	(United States) Michael Qualls	(Indonesia) Stayhoops
Dewa United Banten	(Indonesia) Zaki Iskandar	(Argentina) Pablo Favarel	(Indonesia) Kaleb Ramot Gemilang	(Indonesia) Juara
Hangtuah Jakarta	(Indonesia) Ardi Darmawan Moeljoto	(Indonesia) Wahyu Widayat Jati	(Indonesia) Fisyaiful Amir	(Indonesia) Injers
Kesatria Bengawan Solo	(Indonesia) Taufik Ramadan	(Serbia) Miloš Pejić	(Indonesia) Kevin Moses	(Indonesia) Mills
Pacific Caesar Surabaya	(Indonesia) Soegiono Hartono	(Indonesia) Andika Supriadi Saputra	(Indonesia) Gregorio Claudio Wibowo	(Indonesia) Terra
Pelita Jaya Jakarta	(Indonesia) Adhi Pratama	(United States) Justin Tatum	(Indonesia) Andakara Prastawa	(Indonesia) Mills
Prawira Harum Bandung	(Indonesia) Andri Syarel Octreanes	(United States) David Singleton	(Indonesia) Yudha Saputera	(Indonesia) Sportama
Rajawali Medan	(Indonesia) Oei A Kiat	(Indonesia) Arif Gunarto	(Indonesia) Cassiopeia Manuputty	(Indonesia) Global
RANS Simba Bogor	(Indonesia) Andrey Rido Mahardika	(England) Anthony Garbelotto	(Indonesia) Mei Joni	(Indonesia) Juara
Satria Muda Pertamina	(Indonesia) Theodore Wira Adi	(Indonesia) Youbel Sondakh	(Indonesia) Abraham Damar Grahita	(Indonesia) Juara
Satya Wacana Saints Salatiga	(Indonesia) Dodik Tri Purnomo	(Indonesia) Jerry Lolowang	(Indonesia) Henry Cornelis Lakay	(Indonesia) One Stop Basketball
Tangerang Hawks	(Indonesia) Tikky Suwantikno	(Indonesia) Antonius Joko Endratmo	(Indonesia) Winston Swenjaya	(Indonesia) Motion Sport

=== Foreign, heritage and naturalized players ===
As mentioned, the rule changes that were implemented last season remain in effect this season without any changes and rules regarding foreign, heritage, and naturalized players were included there. The majority of teams, for the first time, managed to fulfill their heritage/naturalized player slot with 6 naturalized players and 5 heritage players.

- Players named in **bold** indicates the player was registered mid-season.
- Former players named in italics are players that were out of squad or left the club within the season, after the pre-season transfer window, or in the mid-season transfer window, and at least had one appearance.

Teams	Player 1	Player 2	Player 3	Heritage or Naturalized Player	Former players
Bali United Basketball	(United States) Bobby Arthur-Williams Jr.	(United States) Xavier Cannefax	(United States) (Guyana) Joshua Nurse	(Indonesia) (Japan) Reo Sakai	-
Bima Perkasa Jogja	(United States) Keljin Blevins	(United States) Kierell Green	(United States) Corey Raley-Ross	-	-
Borneo Hornbills	(United States) **Isaiah Briscoe**	(United States) **Nate Grimes**	(Ukraine) **Viacheslav Kravtsov**	(Indonesia) (United States) Xavier Ford	(United States) Devondrick Walker (United States) Michael Qualls (United States) Brandon McCoy (United States) (Jamaica) Akeem Scott
Dewa United Banten	(United States) Jordan Adams	(Dominican Republic) Gelvis Solano	(Mexico) (United States) **Joshua Ibarra**	(Indonesia) (United States Virgin Islands) Lester Prosper	(Senegal) Malik Dime (Ecuador) Bryan Carabalí Porozo
Hangtuah Jakarta	(United States) Rakeem Christmas	(United States) **Devin Davis**	(United States) **Shabazz Muhammad**	-	(Dominican Republic) Adonys Henriquez (Nigeria) (United States) Samuel Adewunmi
Kesatria Bengawan Solo	(Taiwan) (United States) Will Artino	(United States) Travin Thibodeaux	(United States) **Michael Singletary**	-	(Netherlands) Anthony Metten (United States) Dayon Griffin
Pacific Caesar Surabaya	(United States) Miguel Miranda	(United States) (Dominican Republic) **Adonnecy Bramah**	(Senegal) **Malick Diouf**	(Indonesia) (Philippines) Franky Johnson	(France) Alioune Tew (United States) Chrishon Briggs
Pelita Jaya Jakarta	(United States) K. J. McDaniels	(United States) JaQuori McLaughlin	(United States) **Jeff Withey**	(Indonesia) (United States) Anthony Beane	(United States) James Dickey
Prawira Harum Bandung	(Lithuania) Norbertas Giga	(United States) DeVaughn Washington	(United States) **Brandis Raley-Ross**	(Indonesia) (United States) Jamarr Johnson	(United States) John Wesley Murry II
Rajawali Medan	(United States) Quintin Dove	(Haiti) **Djery Baptiste**	(United States) **Eric Michael Hancik**	-	(United States) Chris Seeley (United States) Dennis Clifford (United States) Tyrell Corbin
RANS Simba Bogor	(United States) KJ Buffen	(United States) (Mexico) Aaron Fuller	(Brazil) **Augusto Lima**	(United Kingdom) (Netherlands) Devon van Oostrum	(Belgium) Thomas De Thaey (United States) Taylor Johns
Satria Muda Pertamina	(Guinea) (United States) **Shannon Evans**	(France) **Amine Noua**	(Ukraine) **Artem Pustovyi**	(Indonesia) (United States) Jarron Crump	(United States) Wendell Lewis (United States) Warren Washington (United States) Randy Bell (United States) Le'Bryan Nash
Satya Wacana Saints Salatiga	(United States) Ikcaven Curry	(United States) Marquis Davison	(Democratic Republic of the Congo) **Gracin Bakumanya**	(Indonesia) (Senegal) Serigne Modou Kane	(United States) Jailan Haslem
Tangerang Hawks	(United States) Stephaun Branch	(United States) **Maxie Esho**	(Ukraine) **Artem Kovalov**	(Indonesia) (Philippines) Ebrahim Lopez Enguio	(United States) Jarred Shaw (United States) Christopher Bryant

== Schedule ==
182 matches would be played in the IBL regular season, excluding playoffs. Each team will play each other twice, once at each team's home stadium.

The schedule is as follow.

Phase	Date
Pre-season	18 November 2024 – 4 January 2025
Regular season (Week 1 – 6)	11 January – 16 February 2025
FIBA Asia Cup qualifiers and early Ramadan break
Regular season (Week 7 – 9)	4 – 23 March 2025
Eid al-Fitr and Lebaran break
Regular season (Week 10 – 13)	10 – 30 April 2025
All-Star game	3 May 2025
Regular season (Week 14 – 20)	7 May – 21 June 2025
Playoffs (Best of three)	First Round: 26 June – 6 July 2025; Semifinals: 10 – 13 July 2025; Finals: 17 – 20 July 2025
IBL All Indonesian	16 - 31 August 2025

== Regular season ==
=== League table ===
Pos	Team	Pld	W	L	PF	PA	PD	Pts	Qualification
1	Pelita Jaya Jakarta	26	23	3	2289	1914	+375	49	Advance to Playoffs
2	Dewa United Banten	26	21	5	2381	2019	+362	47	Advance to Playoffs
3	RANS Simba Bogor	26	20	6	2206	2055	+151	46	Advance to Playoffs
4	Satria Muda Pertamina	26	19	7	2311	1966	+345	45	Advance to Playoffs
5	Prawira Bandung	26	16	10	2022	1905	+117	42	Advance to Playoffs
6	Kesatria Bengawan Solo	26	16	10	2083	1951	+132	42	Advance to Playoffs
7	Hangtuah Jakarta	26	16	10	2009	1899	+110	42	Advance to Playoffs
8	Tangerang Hawks	26	13	13	2046	2090	−44	39	Advance to Playoffs
9	Pacific Caesar	26	11	15	2246	2389	−143	37	
10	Borneo Hornbills	26	10	16	2091	2211	−120	36	
11	Bali United	26	5	21	1940	2175	−235	31	
12	Bima Perkasa	26	5	21	1798	2180	−382	31	
13	Satya Wacana	26	4	22	1790	2028	−238	30	
14	Rajawali Medan	26	3	23	1851	2281	−430	29	

Source: IBL Indonesia

=== Results ===
Home \ Away	BBC	BPJ	BHB	DBC	HTJ	KBS	PCC	PJB	PWR	RWM	RNS	SMP	SWS	TGH
Bali United	—	71–54	80–76	67–75	67–77	60–94	89–94	74–83	68–86	96–81	77–81	86–96	76–69	56–66
Bima Perkasa	81–79	—	69–91	75–89	59–100	66–95	90–93(OT)	58–106	53–82	81–79	76–86	65–80	50–62	71–80
Borneo Hornbills	87–82	72–61	—	80–93	68–71	86–90	86–75	93–102	62–92	85–82	85–70	53–109	79–68	68–81
Dewa United Banten	106–63	102–69	111–100	—	90–82	86–84	133–76	85–89	94–87	104–80	80–82	85–77	89–72	109–80
Hangtuah Jakarta	82–59	75–65	85–70	70–81	—	68–84	91–97	81–74	55–64	77–63	85–86	79–74	72–70	77–63
Kesatria Bengawan Solo	94–93(OT)	91–67	85–83	72–81	70–73	—	87–73	53–66	62–60	91–59	94–84	81–79	88–77	70–68
Pacific Caesar	107–99	83–85	96–95	75–92	54–89	110–104	—	94–101	81–82	99–91	93–101	85–94	84–88	99–78
Pelita Jaya Jakarta	77–65	101–68	97–94	96–85	82–66	69–66	102–78	—	111–67	92–59	88–94	77–72	77–65	83–62
Prawira Bandung	77–60	72–67	87–78	86–84	82–69	78–66	78–90	66–83	—	106–64	80–82	76–80	92–80	61–71
Rajawali Medan	76–87	91–88	84–94	63–72	63–84	63–62	62–76	77–94	53–74	—	64–84	66–98	60–57	74–80
RANS Simba Bogor	95–83	83–74	88–86	87–91	86–70	76–80	82–75	72–90	76–72	115–71	—	84–82	80–58	99–86
Satria Muda Pertamina	104–74	83–59	104–67	93–90	85–72	80–74	125–90	85–83(OT)	82–66	94–67	74–80	—	90–56	99–95(OT)
Satya Wacana	83–65	66–69	78–81	62–84	71–76	60–67	75–87	60–69	60–72	78–74	63–83	69–88	—	75–100
Tangerang Hawks	74–64	68–78	71–72	60–100	72–83	86–79	90–82	75–97	74–77	113–85	78–70	87–84	86–78	—

Updated to match(es) played on 21 June 2025. Source: IBL Indonesia
Legend: Blue = home team win; Red = away team win.

== Playoffs ==
=== Bracket ===
First Round
1	Pelita Jaya Jakarta	80	84
8	Tangerang Hawks	59	70
4	Satria Muda Pertamina	76	72	89
5	Prawira Bandung	69	78	72
2	Dewa United Banten	72	76	81
7	Hangtuah Jakarta	63	77	68
3	RANS Simba Bogor	90	85
6	Kesatria Bengawan Solo	72	83

Semifinals
1	Pelita Jaya Jakarta	66	92	89
4	Satria Muda Pertamina	86	58	79
2	Dewa United Banten	100	89	98
3	RANS Simba Bogor	69	95	78

Final
1	Pelita Jaya Jakarta	94	75	73
2	Dewa United Banten	77	80	74

=== First round ===
==== (1) Pelita Jaya Jakarta vs. (8) Tangerang Hawks ====
===== Game 1 =====
YouTube

July 3
7:00 pm

Report
Boxscore

Tangerang Hawks 59, Pelita Jaya Jakarta 80
Scoring by quarter: 10–22, 16–22, 14–24, 19–12
Pts: Maxie Esho 18; Rebs: Artem Kovalov 13; Asts: Andrew Lensun 5	Pts: JaQuori McLaughlin 15; Rebs: Jeff Withey 15; Asts: Beane, McLaughlin 4 each
Pelita Jaya leads series, 1–0

Indoor Stadium Sport Center, Tangerang
Referees: Y. Yip, L. Chun, S. Mukti

===== Game 2 =====
YouTube

July 5
6:00 pm

Report
Boxscore

Pelita Jaya Jakarta 84, Tangerang Hawks 70
Scoring by quarter: 22–22, 29–9, 16–18, 17–21
Pts: JaQuori McLaughlin 20; Rebs: Jeff Withey 14; Asts: Anthony Beane 10	Pts: Stephaun Branch 22; Rebs: Stephaun Branch 12; Asts: Justin Jaya Wiyanto 4
Pelita Jaya wins series, 2–0

GOR Soemantri Brodjonegoro, South Jakarta
Referees: N. Jontapa, O. Leong, R. Yanuwardi

==== (2) Dewa United Banten vs. (7) Hangtuah Jakarta ====
===== Game 1 =====
YouTube

July 3
8:00 pm

Report
Boxscore

Hangtuah Jakarta 63, Dewa United Banten 72
Scoring by quarter: 14–20, 22–20, 15–18, 12–14
Pts: Shabazz Muhammad 25; Rebs: Shabazz Muhammad 12; Asts: Kuntara, Aofar 4 each	Pts: Jordan Adams 20; Rebs: Lester Prosper 15; Asts: Hardianus, Kaleb 6 each
Dewa United leads series, 1–0

GOR Ciracas, East Jakarta
Referees: N. Jontapa, O. Leong, R. Yanuwardi

===== Game 2 =====
YouTube

July 5
8:00 pm

Report
Boxscore

Dewa United Banten 76, Hangtuah Jakarta 77
Scoring by quarter: 20–22, 10–12, 30–17, 16–26
Pts: Jordan Adams 18; Rebs: Joshua Ibarra 23; Asts: Hardianus, Kaleb, Solano 4 each	Pts: Shabazz Muhammad 31; Rebs: Shabazz Muhammad 9 Asts: Januar Kuntara 5
Series tied, 1–1

Dewa United Arena, Tangerang
Referees: Y. Yip, R. Lesmana, L. Chun

===== Game 3 =====
YouTube

July 6
8:00 pm

Report
Boxscore

Dewa United Banten 81, Hangtuah Jakarta 68
Scoring by quarter: 21–19, 12–17, 26–12, 22–20
Pts: Jordan Adams 23; Rebs: Joshua Ibarra 13; Asts: Jordan Adams 9	Pts: Shabazz Muhammad 18; Rebs: Shabazz Muhammad 8 Asts: Januar Kuntara 5
Dewa United wins series, 2–1

Dewa United Arena, Tangerang
Referees: N. Jontapa, R. Lesmana, L. Chun

==== (3) RANS Simba Bogor vs. (6) Kesatria Bengawan Solo ====
===== Game 1 =====
YouTube

June 26
5:00 pm

Report
Boxscore

Kesatria Bengawan Solo 72, RANS Simba Bogor 90
Scoring by quarter: 11–28, 30–16, 14–28, 17–18
Pts: Travin Thibodeaux 20; Rebs: Travin Thibodeaux 12; Asts: Abraham Wenas 5	Pts: KJ Buffen 35; Rebs: KJ Buffen 16; Asts: Devon Van Oostrum 10
RANS Simba leads series, 1–0

Sritex Arena, Surakarta
Referees: N. Jontapa, B. Marfan, L. Chun

===== Game 2 =====
YouTube

June 28
6:00 pm

Report
Boxscore

RANS Simba Bogor 85, Kesatria Bengawan Solo 83
Scoring by quarter: 21–23, 19–13, 21–25, 24–22
Pts: KJ Buffen 22; Rebs: KJ Buffen 16; Asts: Devon Van Oostrum 17	Pts: Travin Thibodeaux 25; Rebs: Travin Thibodeaux 13; Asts: Wenas, Artino 5 each
RANS Simba wins series, 2–0

Gynasium Sekolah Vokasi IPB, Bogor
Referees: Y. Yip, O. Leong, A. Anggoro

==== (4) Satria Muda Pertamina vs. (5) Prawira Bandung ====
===== Game 1 =====
YouTube

June 26
8:00 pm

Report
Boxscore

Prawira Bandung 69, Satria Muda Pertamina 76
Scoring by quarter: 15–22, 20–15, 14–25, 20–14
Pts: Brandis Raley-Ross 24; Rebs: DeVaughn Washington 13; Asts: Nuban, Yudha 3 each	Pts: Shannon Evans 19; Rebs: Noua, Evans 10 each Asts: Shannon Evans 12
Satria Muda leads series, 1–0

C-Tra Prawira Arena, Bandung
Referees: Y. Yip, S. Haryanto, O. Leong

===== Game 2 =====
YouTube

June 28
8:00 pm

Report
Boxscore

Satria Muda Pertamina 72, Prawira Bandung 78
Scoring by quarter: 18–20, 21–22, 17–18, 16–18
Pts: Amine Noua 26; Rebs: Amine Noua 11; Asts: Shannon Evans 9	Pts: Brandis Raley-Ross 40; Rebs: DeVaughn Washington 9 Asts: Yudha Saputera 6
Series tied, 1–1

The BritAma Arena, North Jakarta
Referees: N. Jontapa, R. Lesmana, L. Chun

===== Game 3 =====
YouTube

June 29
8:00 pm

Report
Boxscore

Satria Muda Pertamina 89, Prawira Bandung 72
Scoring by quarter: 14–18, 26–13, 24–17, 25–24
Pts: Abraham Damar Grahita 20; Rebs: Shannon Evans 8 Asts: Shannon Evans 12	Pts: Brandis Raley-Ross 22; Rebs: DeVaughn Washington 7 Asts: Brandis Raley-Ross 8
Satria Muda wins series, 2–1

The BritAma Arena, North Jakarta
Referees: N. Jontapa, B. Marfan, L. Chun

=== Semifinals ===
==== (1) Pelita Jaya Jakarta vs. (4) Satria Muda Pertamina ====
===== Game 1 =====
YouTube

July 10
7:00 pm

Report
Boxscore

Satria Muda Pertamina 86, Pelita Jaya Jakarta 66
Scoring by quarter: 16–15, 24–25, 29–11, 17–15
Pts: Pustovyi, Evans 16 each Rebs: Artem Pustovyi 14; Asts: Widyanta Putra Teja 6	Pts: JaQuori McLaughlin 21; Rebs: Jeff Withey 9 Asts: JaQuori McLaughlin 8
Satria Muda leads series, 1–0

The BritAma Arena, North Jakarta
Referees: L. Kyounghwan, H. Iwai, Y. Kuncara

===== Game 2 =====
YouTube

July 12
6:00 pm

Report
Boxscore

Pelita Jaya Jakarta 92, Satria Muda Pertamina 58
Scoring by quarter: 18–15, 25–9, 28–16, 21–18
Pts: Agassi Goantara 17; Rebs: KJ McDaniels 11; Asts: JaQuori McLaughlin 7	Pts: Artem Pustovyi 11; Rebs: Amine Noua 9 Asts: Widyanta Putra Teja 4
Series tied, 1–1

GOR Soemantri Brodjonegoro, South Jakarta
Referees: P. Kyoungjin, U. Daigo, A. Anggoro

===== Game 3 =====
YouTube

July 13
6:00 pm

Report
Boxscore

Pelita Jaya Jakarta 89, Satria Muda Pertamina 79
Scoring by quarter: 21–16, 18–22, 27–21, 23–20
Pts: Anthony Beane 21; Rebs: Jeff Withey 11; Asts: Anthony Beane 7	Pts: Amine Noua 22; Rebs: Bagir, Pustovyi 6 each Asts: Shannon Evans 11
Pelita Jaya wins series, 2–1

GOR Soemantri Brodjonegoro, South Jakarta
Referees: U. Daigo, P. Kyoungjin, R. Lesmana

==== (2) Dewa United Banten vs. (3) RANS Simba Bogor ====
===== Game 1 =====
YouTube

July 10
8:00 pm

Report
Boxscore

RANS Simba Bogor 69, Dewa United Banten 100
Scoring by quarter: 4–23, 25–34, 25–20, 15–23
Pts: Devon Van Oostrum 30; Rebs: Aaron Fuller 13; Asts: Devon Van Oostrum 7	Pts: Gelvis Solano 27; Rebs: Joshua Ibarra 15; Asts: Gelvis Solano 8
Dewa United leads series, 1–0

Gynasium Sekolah Vokasi IPB, Bogor
Referees: U. Daigo, P. Kyoungjin, R. Lesmana

===== Game 2 =====
YouTube

July 12
8:00 pm

Report
Boxscore

Dewa United Banten 89, RANS Simba Bogor 95
Scoring by quarter: 20–18, 28–17, 23–32, 18–28
Pts: Joshua Ibarra 23; Rebs: Joshua Ibarra 16; Asts: Hardianus, Ibarra, Solano 6 each	Pts: KJ Buffen 32; Rebs: KJ Buffen 10; Asts: Devon Van Oostrum 11
Series tied, 1–1

Dewa United Arena, Tangerang
Referees: L. Kyounghwan, H. Iwai, H. Sutaryo

===== Game 3 =====
YouTube

July 13
8:00 pm

Report
Boxscore

Dewa United Banten 98, RANS Simba Bogor 78
Scoring by quarter: 23–25, 29–27, 23–16, 23–10
Pts: Joshua Ibarra 31; Rebs: Joshua Ibarra 21; Asts: Gelvis Solano 7	Pts: KJ Buffen 21; Rebs: KJ Buffen 12; Asts: KJ Buffen 7
Dewa United wins series, 2–1

Dewa United Arena, Tangerang
Referees: L. Kyounghwan, H. Iwai, R. Putra

=== Finals: (1) Pelita Jaya Jakarta vs. (2) Dewa United Banten ===
==== Game 1 ====
YouTube

July 17
7:00 pm

Report
Boxscore

Dewa United Banten 77, Pelita Jaya Jakarta 94
Scoring by quarter: 23–23, 10–22, 18–21, 26–28
Pts: Jordan Adams 25; Rebs: Joshua Ibarra 13; Asts: Gelvis Solano 8	Pts: Anthony Beane 22; Rebs: Jeff Withey 13; Asts: JaQuori McLaughlin 6
Pelita Jaya leads series, 1–0

Dewa United Arena, Tangerang
Referees: L. Kyounghwan, U. Daigo, Y. Norida

==== Game 2 ====
YouTube

July 19
7:00 pm

Report
Boxscore

Pelita Jaya Jakarta 75, Dewa United Banten 80
Scoring by quarter: 10–24, 23–26, 19–12, 23–18
Pts: Beane, McLaughlin 20 each Rebs: Jeff Withey 11; Asts: Anthony Beane 6	Pts: Jordan Adams 24; Rebs: Joshua Ibarra 17; Asts: Hardianus, Solano 5 each
Series tied, 1–1

GOR Soemantri Brodjonegoro, South Jakarta
Referees: U. Daigo, L. Kyounghwan, H. Sutaryo

==== Game 3 ====
YouTube

July 20
7:00 pm

Report
Boxscore

Pelita Jaya Jakarta 73, Dewa United Banten 74
Scoring by quarter: 20–20, 16–14, 22–18, 15–22
Pts: Anthony Beane 20; Rebs: KJ McDaniels 12; Asts: Anthony Beane 6	Pts: Jordan Adams 40; Rebs: Joshua Ibarra 13; Asts: Hardianus, Kaleb, Ibarra 4 each
Dewa United wins series, 2–1

GOR Soemantri Brodjonegoro, South Jakarta
Referees: U. Daigo, L. Kyounghwan, R. Lesmana

== Awards ==
2025 IBL awards
Award	Recipient(s)	Finalists
IBL Most Valuable Player Award	(United States) K. J. McDaniels (Pelita Jaya)	Jordan Adams (Dewa United Basketball); William Artino (Kesatria Bengawan Solo)
Local Player of the Year	(Indonesia) Agassi Goantara (Pelita Jaya)	Abraham Wenas (Kesatria Bengawan Solo); Yudha Saputera (Prawira Bandung); Abraham Damar Grahita (Satria Muda); Diftha Pratama (Hangtuah Jakarta)
Rookie of the Year	(Indonesia) Sahid Kasim (Hangtuah Jakarta)	Oka Yogiswara (Bali United); Yeremia (Satya Wacana Saints)
Coach of the Year	(England) Tony Garbelotto (RANS Simba Bogor)	David Singleton (Prawira Bandung)
Defensive Player of the Year	(Indonesia) Galank Gunawan (RANS Simba Bogor)	Agassi Goantara (Pelita Jaya); Abraham Damar Grahita (Satria Muda)
Sixthman of the Year	(Indonesia) Rio Disi (Dewa United Banten)	Arki Dikania Wisnu (Dewa United Banten); Daniel Salamena (RANS Simba Bogor)
Most Improved Player of the Year	(Indonesia) Neo Putu Pande (Bali United)	Gede Elgi Wimbardi (Bali United); Kevin Sihombing (Satya Wacana Saints)
Sportmanship Award	(British Virgin Islands) (Indonesia) Lester Prosper (Dewa United Banten)	
Referee of the Year	(Indonesia) Budi Marfan	Rendra Lesana; Arnas Anggoro; Yosep Norida; Rochmad Yunardi

=== All-Team's Awards ===
- All-Local IBL First Team:
  - Agassi Goantara, Pelita Jaya
  - Yudha Saputera, Prawira Bandung
  - Kaleb Gemilang, Dewa United Banten
  - Arki Dikania Wisnu, Dewa United Banten
  - Pandu Wiguna, Prawira Bandung
- All-Local IBL Second Team:
  - Galank Gunawan, RANS Simba Bogor
  - Diftha Pratama, Hangtuah Jakarta
  - Abraham Damar Grahita, Satria Muda Pertamina
  - Juan Laurent, Satria Muda Pertamina
  - Ali Bagir, Satria Muda Pertamina

- All-IBL Gopay First Team:
  - K.J. McDaniels, Pelita Jaya
  - Gelvis Solano, Dewa United Banten
  - Jordan Adams, Dewa United Banten
  - Devon van Oostrum, RANS Simba Bogor
  - William Artino, Kesatria Bengawan Solo
- All-IBL Gopay Second Team:
  - Brandis Raley-Ross, Prawira Bandung
  - JaQuori McLaughlin, Pelita Jaya
  - Aaron Fuller, RANS Simba Bogor
  - KJ Buffen, RANS Simba Bogor
  - Kaleb Ramot Gemilang, Dewa United Banten

- All-Local IBL Defensive Team:
  - Agassi Goantara, Pelita Jaya
  - Yudha Saputera, Prawira Bandung
  - Januar Kuntara, Hangtuah Jakarta
  - Diftha Pratama, Hangtuah Jakarta
  - Galank Gunawan, RANS Simba Bogor
- All-IBL Defensive Team:
  - Lester Prosper, Dewa United Banten
  - Travin Thibodeaux, Kesatria Bengawan Solo
  - K.J. McDaniels, Pelita Jaya
  - Norbertas Giga, Prawira Bandung
  - William Artino, Kesatria Bengawan Solo

== All-Star Games ==
=== Pre-game ===
Three-point contest champion : (Indonesia) Abraham Damar Grahita (Satria Muda Pertamina)

Participants
Pos.	Player	Team	Ht.
G	Abraham Damar Grahita	Satria Muda Bandung	5'11
G	Diftha Pratama	Amartha Hangtuah	6'1
G/F	Kaleb Ramot Gemilang	Dewa United Banten	6'0
G	Miguel Miranda	Pacific Caesar	6'6
G	Adonys Henriquez	Amartha Hangtuah	6'7

=== Half game ===
Slam-dunk contest champion : (United States) AJ Bramah (Pacific Caesar)

Participants
Pos.	Player	Team	Ht.
F	Quintin Dove	Rajawali Medan	6'7
G	Marquis Davison	Satya Wacana Saints	6'5
F	AJ Bramah	Pacific Caesar	6'7
G	Stephaun Branch	Tangerang Hawks	6'5

=== Game ===
==== Indonesia Stars ====
Pos	Name	Club
Starters
G	(Indonesia) Abraham Damar Grahita	Satria Muda Pertamina
G	(United Kingdom) Devon Van Oostrum	RANS Simba Bogor
C	(Indonesia) Lester Prosper	Dewa United Banten
C/F	(Indonesia) Pandu Wiguna	Prawira Bandung
G	(Indonesia) Muhamad Arighi	Pelita Jaya
Reserves
G	(Indonesia) Yudha Saputera	Prawira Bandung
C	(Indonesia) Vincent Kosasih	Pelita Jaya
G	(Indonesia) Diftha Pratama	Amartha Hangtuah
G	(Indonesia) Avan Seputra	Satria Muda Pertamina
G/F	(Indonesia) Brandon Jawato (injured)	Pelita Jaya
F/G	(Indonesia) Kaleb Ramot Gemilang	Dewa United Banten
G	(Indonesia) Fisyaiful Amir	Amartha Hangtuah
G	(Indonesia) Anthony Beane (family matter)	Pelita Jaya
G	(Philippines) Franky Johnson	Pacific Caesar
F	(Indonesia) Muhammad Reza Guntara	Pelita Jaya
Coach
	(Indonesia) Wahyu Widayat Jati	Amartha Hangtuah

==== Foreign Stars ====
Pos	Name	Club
Starters
C	(Chinese Taipei) William Artino	Kesatria Bengawan Solo
G	(United States) Stephaun Branch	Tangerang Hawks
F	(United States) K.J. McDaniels	Pelita Jaya
G	(Dominican Republic) Gelvis Solano	Dewa United Banten
F	(United States) Quintin Dove	Rajawali Medan
Reserves
G	(United States) Xavier Cannefax	Bali United Basketball
F	(United States) Rakeem Christmas	Amartha Hangtuah
F	(United States) AJ Bramah	Pacific Caesar
G	(United States) JaQuori McLaughlin	Pelita Jaya
G/F	(United States) Jordan Admas (injured)	Dewa United Banten
G/F	(United States) KJ Buffen	RANS Simba Bogor
G	(United States) Michael Qualls (injured)	Borneo Hornbills
G	(Dominican Republic) Adonys Henriquez	Amartha Hangtuah
G	(United States) Travin Thibodeaux	Kesatria Bengawan Solo
Coach
	(United States) David Singleton	Prawira Bandung

Vidio

3 May 2025
18:30 pm WIB

Foreign Stars 144, Indonesia Stars 129

BritAma Arena, Jakarta
Attendance: 5,000

==== Most Valuable Player ====
Country	Name	Team
(Chinese Taipei)	William Artino	Kesatria Bengawan Solo

== All Indonesian Cup ==
All games were held in GOR Manahan, Solo from 16 to 31 August 2025. Only local players participated during this competition.

=== Group A ===
Pos	Team	Pld	W	L	PF	PA	PD	Pts	Qualification
1	Satria Muda Bandung	6	6	0	521	457	+64	12	Advance to semi-finals
2	Dewa United Banten	6	5	1	428	337	+91	11	Advance to semi-finals
3	Tangerang Hawks	6	3	3	446	390	+56	9	
4	Rajawali Medan	6	3	3	419	444	−25	9	
5	Bima Perkasa Jogja	6	2	4	353	444	−91	8	
6	Pacific Caesar	6	1	5	390	445	−55	7	
7	Borneo Hornbills	6	1	5	409	477	−68	7	

Updated to match(es) played on unknown. Source: IBL Indonesia

=== Group B ===
Pos	Team	Pld	W	L	PF	PA	PD	Pts	Qualification
1	Pelita Jaya Jakarta	5	5	0	354	272	+82	10	Advance to semi-finals
2	Hangtuah Jakarta	5	3	2	300	287	+13	8	Advance to semi-finals
3	Kesatria Bengawan Solo	5	3	2	336	320	+16	8	
4	RANS Simba Bogor	5	2	3	289	320	−31	7	
5	Bali United Basketball	5	1	4	310	334	−24	6	
6	Satya Wacana	5	1	4	254	308	−54	6	

Updated to match(es) played on unknown. Source: IBL Indonesia

=== Semifinals ===
==== Game 1 ====
YouTube

August 26
5:00 pm

Report
Boxscore

Satria Muda Bandung 86, Hangtuah Jakarta 58
Scoring by quarter: 27–17, 22–13, 20–15, 17–13
Pts: Abraham Damar Grahita 24; Rebs: Karl Patrick Gloria 7 Asts: Avan, Widyanta, Erga 4 each	Pts: Fisyaiful Amir 20; Rebs: Fisyaiful Amir 6 Asts: Richard Kornelius 3

GOR Indoor Manahan, Surakarta
Referees: S. Wibowo, A. Mubalek, F. Ashari

==== Game 2 ====
YouTube

August 26
8:00 pm

Report
Boxscore

Pelita Jaya Jakarta 63, Dewa United Banten 71
Scoring by quarter: 21–17, 18–15, 16–22, 8–17
Pts: Andakara Prastawa 20; Rebs: Vincent Kosasih 9 Asts: Agassi Goantara 3	Pts: Bryan Fernando Korisano 16; Rebs: Nikolas, Liem 8 each Asts: Radithyo Wibowo 10

GOR Indoor Manahan, Surakarta
Referees: H. Sutaryo, R. Yanuardi, P. August

=== Final ===
==== Game 1 ====
YouTube

August 28
6:30 pm

Report
Boxscore

Satria Muda Bandung 76, Dewa United Banten 67
Scoring by quarter: 17–17, 16–21, 17–12, 26–17
Pts: Yudha Saputera 17; Rebs: Abraham Damar Grahita 8 Asts: Yudha Saputera 7	Pts: Patrick Nikolas 19; Rebs: Kristian Liem 10; Asts: Nikolas, Radithyo 4 each
Satria Muda leads series, 1–0

GOR Indoor Manahan, Surakarta
Referees: A. Mubalek, R. Yanuwardi, M. Fazrin

==== Game 2 ====
YouTube

August 30
6:30 pm

Report
Boxscore

Dewa United Banten 55, Satria Muda Bandung 65
Scoring by quarter: 10–19, 17–9, 15–16, 13–21
Pts: Erick Ibrahim Junior 12; Rebs: Patrick Nikolas 12; Asts: Kennie Elbert 4	Pts: Abraham Damar Grahita 22; Rebs: Grahita, Chalias 6 each Asts: Grahita, Yudha 4 each
Satria Muda wins series, 2–0

GOR Indoor Manahan, Surakarta
Referees: S. Wibowo, F. Ashari, P. August
