= Pandu Wiguna =

Indonesian basketball player

No. 34 – Dewa United Banten
- Position: Center / power forward
- League: IBL

Personal information
- Born: 6 October 1995 (age 31) Riau, Indonesia
- Listed height: 194 cm (6 ft 4 in)
- Listed weight: 78 kg (172 lb)

Career information
- College: Telkom University (2013-2019)
- Playing career: 2017–present

Career history
- 2017-2025: Garuda Bandung / Prawira Bandung
- 2025-2026: Satria Muda Bandung
- 2026-present: Dewa United Banten

Career highlights
- IBL champion (2023); 2× All-IBL Indonesian First Team (2024, 2025); IBL Slam-dunk contest champion (2024); 3× IBL All-Star (2024-2026); IBL All Indonesian Cup champion (2025)

Pandu Wiguna (born October 6, 1995) is an Indonesian professional basketball player for the Dewa United Banten BC of the Indonesian Basketball League (IBL). He is nicknamed "Pan-Dunk" as he's known for his powerful slam dunks.

== Professional career ==
As a rookie, Wiguna participated in the 2018 IBL Slam-Dunk contest. In 2024, Wiguna became the first ever local player to win the IBL Slam-dunk contest winning with 166 points from the judges.

== National team career ==
He has been a member of Indonesia's national basketball team for the 2024 FIBA Pre-Qualifying Olympic.
