= Xavier Cannefax =

American basketball player (born 1989)

No. 1 – Pacific Caesar
- Position: Point guard
- League: IBL

Personal information
- Born: September 22, 1989 (age 37) Salem, Oregon, U.S.
- Listed height: 6 ft 3 in (1.91 m)
- Listed weight: 185 lb (84 kg)

Career information
- High school: South Salem (Salem, Oregon)
- College: Warner Pacific (2015–2018)
- NBA draft: 2018: undrafted
- Playing career: 2018–present

Career history
- 2018–2019: Uppsala
- 2019: Al Rayyan
- 2019–2020: Apollo Amsterdam
- 2020–2022: Prizreni
- 2022–2023: Târgu Jiu
- 2023: Al Ahli Tripoli
- 2023: Ostioneros de Guaymas
- 2023–2025: Bali United
- 2025–present: Pacific Caesar

Career highlights
- IBL All-Star (2025); DBL top scorer (2020)

Xavier Charles Cannefax (born September 22, 1989) is an American professional basketball player for Pacific Caesar of the Indonesian Basketball League (IBL). He played college basketball for the Warner Pacific Knights.

== Career ==
In the 2019–20 season, Cannefax played for Apollo Amsterdam in the Dutch Basketball League (DBL). The season was ended early due to the COVID-19 pandemic. He averaged 20.2 points per game in 19 games, which made him the leading scorer of the DBL.

On November 9, 2020, Cannefax signed with Ponte Prizreni in Kosovo.

On February 26, 2023, Cannefax was announced by Al Ahli Tripoli of the Libyan Division 1.

In April 2023, Cannefax joined the Ostioneros de Guaymas of the Circuito de Baloncesto de la Costa del Pacífico (CIBACOPA).

In December 2023, Cannefax joined the Bali United of the Indonesian Basketball League (IBL). In December 2024, he returned to the Bali United for the 2025 IBL season.
