= Galank Gunawan =

Indonesian basketball player

No. 66 – RANS Simba Bogor
- Position: Center / power forward
- League: IBL

Personal information
- Born: June 13, 1987 (age 39) Sampit, Indonesia
- Listed height: 198 cm (6 ft 6 in)
- Listed weight: 89 kg (196 lb)

Career information
- College: Perbanas Institute (2009-2014)
- Playing career: 2008–present

Career history
- 2008-2013: Satria Muda BritAma
- 2013-2018: Garuda/Prawira Bandung
- 2018-2019: Bima Perkasa Yogyakarta
- 2020-2021: Louvre Surabaya
- 2021-2022: Bima Perkasa Yogyakarta
- 2023-2024: Bali United Basketball
- 2024-present: RANS Simba Bogor

Career highlights
- 3× NBL Indonesia champion (2009, 2011, 2012); 3× NBL/IBL Indonesia Defensive Player of the Year (2025, 2013, 2015); IBL All-Star (2025); All-IBL Indonesian Second Team (2025); All-IBL Local Defensive Team (2025)
Medals
Men's basketball
Representing Indonesia
SEA Games
Silver medal – second place	2015 Singapore	Team

Galank Gunawan (born June 13, 1987) is an Indonesian professional basketball player for the RANS Simba Bogor of the Indonesian Basketball League (IBL). Known for his physique, Galank joins the 1,000 rebounds club, which is a rare feat to accomplish, he is often given the moniker "Rebound King" in the IBL.

== Professional career ==
He is a three-time Defensive Player of the Year recipient.

== National team career ==
Galank represented the Indonesia men's national team in the 2013 SEA Games held in Myanmar, and in the 2015 SEA Games in Singapore, where they successfully won the silver medal.
