= Tremont Waters =

American basketball player (born 1998)

- Waters with ASVEL in 2026

No. 51 – ASVEL
- Position: Point guard
- League: LNB Élite; EuroLeague

Personal information
- Born: January 10, 1998 (age 28) New Haven, Connecticut, U.S.
- Listed height: 1.80 m (5 ft 11 in)
- Listed weight: 175 lb (79 kg)

Career information
- High school: Notre Dame (West Haven, Connecticut)
- College: LSU (2017–2019)
- NBA draft: 2019: 2nd round, 51st overall pick
- Drafted by: Boston Celtics
- Playing career: 2019–present

Career history
- 2019–2021: Boston Celtics
- 2019–2020: →Maine Red Claws
- 2021–2022: Wisconsin Herd
- 2021–2022: Toronto Raptors
- 2022: Washington Wizards
- 2022: South Bay Lakers
- 2022–2024: Gigantes de Carolina
- 2022–2023: Metropolitans 92
- 2023–2024: Guangdong Southern Tigers
- 2024: Shanghai Sharks
- 2026: Gigantes de Carolina
- 2026–present: ASVEL

Career highlights
- NBA G League Rookie of the Year (2020); NBA G League All-Rookie Team (2020); All-NBA G League Second Team (2020); BSN champion (2023); BSN Rookie of the Year (2022); First-team All-SEC (2019); SEC Co-Defensive Player of the Year (2019); SEC All-Freshman Team (2018)
- Stats at NBA.com
- Stats at Basketball Reference

Tremont Waters (born January 10, 1998) is a Puerto Rican professional basketball player for ASVEL of the French LNB Élite and the EuroLeague. He played college basketball for the LSU Tigers, and was drafted in the second round of the 2019 NBA draft by the Boston Celtics.

== Early life ==
Waters played at South Kent School, a private all-boys school in Connecticut for three years. He transferred prior to his senior year to Notre Dame High School in West Haven, Connecticut. In 2015, he tried out for the Puerto Rico men's national basketball team's U-17 squad. One of the wishes of his late father was for him to come to Puerto Rico and explore his Puerto Rican roots on his mother's side, since his mother Vanessa has family in San Juan.

As a senior, he was selected for the Jordan Brand Classic. He initially committed to Georgetown but decommitted shortly before coach John Thompson III was fired. Ranked number 37 overall in his high school class by Rivals.com, Waters committed to LSU and coach Will Wade on June 5, 2017. Waters was the 2017 Gatorade and Register State Player of the Year in Connecticut.

== College career ==
On November 22, 2017, Waters scored a season-high 39 points on 13-of-22 shooting in a 94–84 loss to Marquette. As a freshman at LSU, Waters averaged 15.9 points, 6.0 assists and 3.4 rebounds per game. His 198 assists broke the school record for assists by a freshman set by Ben Simmons. Waters was named to the Freshman All-SEC team and was the Freshman of the Year in Louisiana. After the season, Waters entered his name in the 2018 NBA draft but did not hire an agent to preserve his collegiate eligibility. He announced his return to LSU for his sophomore season on May 29, 2018.

Waters scored the game-winning layup for LSU against the No. 6 seeded Maryland Terrapins in the second round of the 2019 NCAA tournament on March 23, 2019. Waters shot 39.6 percent (17 of 43) from the field in the tournament, averaging 16.7 points, 4.7 assists and 1.7 steals per game. He earned All-SEC first team honors that season along with his strong tournament performance.

== Professional career ==
=== Boston Celtics (2019–2021) ===
On June 20, 2019, Waters was selected with the 51st overall pick in the 2019 NBA draft by the Boston Celtics. Waters played for the Celtics during the 2019 NBA Summer League season and averaged 10.0 points, 5.3 assists, 2.0 rebounds, and 2.0 steals in 22.5 minutes through the first four games helping the Celtics clinch the number one seed going into the tournament.

On July 12, 2019, Waters' father was found dead at a Super 8 Hotel room in West Haven, Connecticut in an apparent suicide. Despite this, Waters played 32 minutes in the tournament game the following day, July 13. The Celtics fell short to the Grizzlies and were eliminated from Summer League Championship contention despite a 16-point effort from Waters. Waters concluded his 2019 Summer League run leading the team in minutes per game as well as averaging 11.2 points, a team high 4.8 assists, and 2.0 steals. On July 25, 2019, the Celtics announced that they had signed Waters to a two-way contract, splitting time with the Maine Red Claws. He scored 24 points in two games in the NBA G League in November. On November 24, the Celtics recalled Waters after an injury to Kemba Walker. On January 9, 2020, Waters posted 30 points, seven assists and five steals for Maine in a 120-118 triple overtime win over the Capital City Go-Go. He averaged 18.0 points, 7.3 assists, 3.2 rebounds and 1.89 steals per game in 36 G League games. On June 18, 2020, Waters was named NBA G League Rookie of the Year. On November 23, 2020, Waters re-signed with the Celtics.

=== Wisconsin Herd (2021) ===
On September 27, 2021, Waters signed with the Milwaukee Bucks. However, he was waived prior to the start of the season. In October 2021, he joined the Wisconsin Herd as an affiliate player. In 13 games, he averaged 17.2 points on .421/.364/.714 shooting, 6.0 assists, and 2.7 steals in 31.5 minutes per game.

=== Toronto Raptors (2021–2022) ===
On December 22, 2021, Waters signed a 10-day contract with the Toronto Raptors.

=== Washington Wizards (2022) ===
On January 1, 2022, Waters signed a 10-day contract with the Washington Wizards via the hardship exemption.

=== Return to the Herd (2022) ===
After his 10-day contracts expired, Waters was reacquired by the Wisconsin Herd. He averaged 15.4 points, 2.5 rebounds and 6.9 assists per game.

=== South Bay Lakers (2022) ===
On February 24, 2022, Waters was traded, along with a 2022 second-round pick, to the South Bay Lakers in exchange for Frank Mason III and a 2022 first-round pick.

=== Gigantes de Carolina (2022–2023) ===
On March 1, 2022, Waters was selected with the first pick overall in the 2022 Baloncesto Superior Nacional draft by the Gigantes de Carolina joining them after South Bay's season ended.

Tremont made his debut on April 11, 2022, powered Carolina's offense throughout the season, averaged 17.8 points and 8.0 assists 1.7 steals per game. He was selected as BSN Rookie Of The Year 2022 and leading in assists.

Waters joined the Memphis Grizzlies for the 2022 NBA Summer League.

On July 26, 2023, Waters helped the Gigantes to win their first BSN title against the defending champions Vaqueros de Bayamón. They dominated the Vaqueros in five games.

=== Metropolitans 92 (2022–2023) ===
On July 23, 2022, Waters signed with Metropolitans 92 of the LNB Pro A.

=== Return to Carolina (2024) ===
On May 24, 2024, Waters signed with the Gigantes de Carolina of the Baloncesto Superior Nacional.

=== Shanghai Sharks (2024) ===
On September 10, 2024, Waters signed with the Shanghai Sharks of the Chinese Basketball Association (CBA).

=== ASVEL (2026–present) ===
On August 23, 2026, Waters signed with ASVEL of the French LNB Élite and the EuroLeague.

== National team career ==
Tremont Waters is of Puerto Rican descent. He opted to play for the Puerto Rico men's national basketball team for the 2023 FIBA Basketball World Cup. He was part of the team that helped Puerto Rico qualify for the 2024 Summer Olympics after defeating both Mexico in the semifinals and Lithuania in the final of one of four 2024 FIBA Men's Olympic Qualifying Tournaments. For the tournament he averaged 15.3 points, 1.3 rebounds, 5.0 assists and 1.5 steals.

== Career statistics ==
Legend
GP	Games played	GS	Games started	MPG	Minutes per game
FG%	Field goal percentage	3P%	3-point field goal percentage	FT%	Free throw percentage
RPG	Rebounds per game	APG	Assists per game	SPG	Steals per game
BPG	Blocks per game	PPG	Points per game	**Bold**	Career high

=== NBA ===
==== Regular season ====
Year	Team	GP	GS	MPG	FG%	3P%	FT%	RPG	APG	SPG	BPG	PPG
2019–20	Boston	11	1	10.8	.286	.167	**1.000**	1.1	1.5	.9	**.2**	3.6
2020–21	Boston	**26**	**3**	9.2	.405	**.395**	.941	.8	2.4	.6	.0	3.8
2021–22	Toronto	2	0	**21.0**	.250	.222	—	**2.0**	**3.5**	**2.0**	.0	**4.0**
2021–22	Washington	1	0	8.0	.**500**	—	—	.0	.0	.0	.0	2.0
Career		40	4	10.2	.354	.296	.960	.9	2.1	.8	.1	3.7

==== Playoffs ====
Year	Team	GP	GS	MPG	FG%	3P%	FT%	RPG	APG	SPG	BPG	PPG
2020	Boston	1	0	**2.0**	.000	.000	—	**1.0**	**1.0**	.0	.0	0.0
2021	Boston	**3**	0	**2.0**	**.250**	.000	**.667**	.0	.7	**.3**	.0	**1.3**
Career		4	0	2.0	.200	.000	.667	.3	.8	.3	.0	1.0

=== College ===
Year	Team	GP	GS	MPG	FG%	3P%	FT%	RPG	APG	SPG	BPG	PPG
2017–18	LSU	**33**	**32**	**33.0**	.417	**.351**	.801	**3.4**	**6.0**	2.0	**.1**	**15.9**
2018–19	LSU	**33**	29	32.4	**.429**	.327	**.813**	2.8	5.8	**2.8**	**.1**	15.3
Career		66	61	32.7	.423	.340	.807	3.1	5.9	2.4	.1	15.6
