= Diftha Pratama =

Indonesian basketball player

RANS Simba Bogor
- Position: Shooting guard
- League: IBL

Personal information
- Born: 6 November 1989 (age 37) Indonesia
- Listed height: 186 cm (6 ft 1 in)
- Listed weight: 85 kg (187 lb)

Career information
- College: Prof Dr. Moestopo University
- Playing career: 2012–present

Career history
- 2012-2022: Garuda Bandung
- 2022-2026: Amartha Hangtuah
- 2026-present: RANS Simba Bogor

Career highlights
- All-IBL Indonesian Second Team (2025); All-IBL Local Defensive Team (2025); All-IBL Indonesian Third Team (2020); 2x IBL All-Star (2017, 2025)
Medals
Men's basketball
Representing Indonesia
SEA Games
Silver medal – second place	2017 Kuala Lumpur	Team

Diftha Pratama (born November 6, 1989) is an Indonesian professional basketball player for the RANS Simba Bogor of the Indonesian Basketball League (IBL).

He represented Indonesia's national basketball team at the 2017 SEABA Championship and 2017 SEA Games.
