= Erick Ibrahim Junior =

Indonesian basketball player (born 2003)

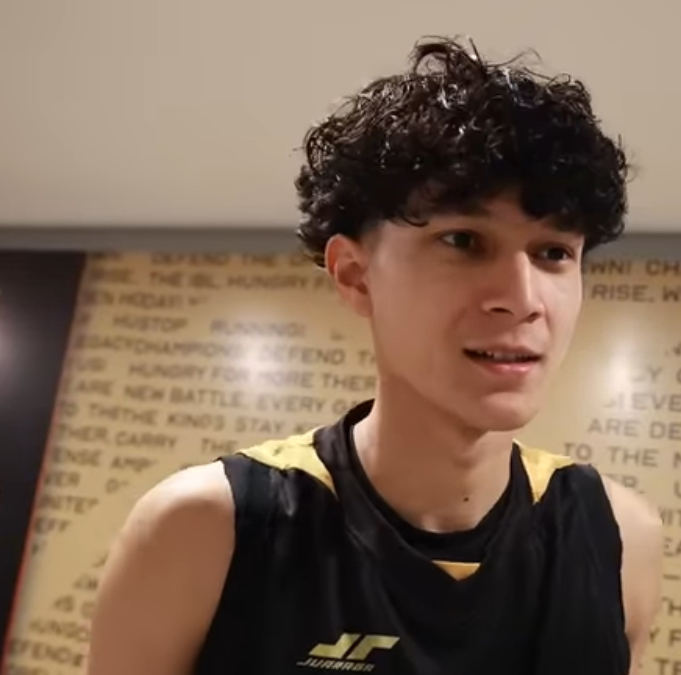
- Erick with Dewa United Banten in 2026

No. 4 – Dewa United Banten
- Position: Shooting guard
- League: IBL

Personal information
- Born: December 15, 2003 (age 22) Bandung, Indonesia
- Listed height: 196 cm (6 ft 5 in)
- Listed weight: 78 kg (172 lb)

Career information
- High school: SMAN 116 (Jakarta, Indonesia)
- College: UPH
- Playing career: 2023–present

Career history
- 2023: Indonesia Patriots
- 2024-present: Dewa United Banten

Career highlights
- IBL champion (2025); IBL All-Star (2026); LIMA champion (2025)
Medals
Men's 3x3 basketball
Representing Indonesia
ASEAN University Games
Bronze medal – third place	2024 Surabaya-Malang	Team 3x3

Erick Ibrahim Junior (born December 15, 2003) is an Indonesian professional basketball player for Dewa United Banten of the Indonesian Basketball League (IBL). He played college basketball for the UPH Eagles.

== Personal life ==
Erick is the son of former Indonesia national team goalkeeper, Erick Ibrahim, who is also half Dutch. He is currently a goalkeeping coach for Garudayaksa F.C. of the Championship.

Erick's younger brother, Tristan Ibrahim, plays football for Dewa United Youth as a defender and recently represented the Indonesia national under-17 football team.

== Professional career ==
=== Indonesia Patriots ===
In the 2023 season, Erick debuted in the highest basketball level in Indonesia with the Indonesia Patriots. He played a total of 16 games, averaging 3.6 minutes of playing time per game.

=== Dewa United ===
Erick played for Dewa United in the 2025 IBL All-Indonesian. Facing Tangerang Hawks, he scored a double-double, helping the team with 12 points and 14 rebounds. Dewa won 70–52.

== National team career ==
Erick represented the Indonesia men's national 3x3 team in the qualifiers for the 2024 FIBA 3x3 Asia Cup.
