= Radithyo Wibowo =

Indonesian basketball player

No. 55 – Dewa United Banten
- Position: Point guard / shooting guard
- League: IBL

Personal information
- Born: 25 April 2005 (age 21) Jakarta, Indonesia
- Listed height: 178 cm (5 ft 10 in)
- Listed weight: 69 kg (152 lb)

Career information
- High school: SMAN 116 (Jakarta, Indonesia)
- College: Perbanas Institute (2023-2024); Multimedia Nusantara University (2024-present)
- Playing career: 2023–present

Career history
- 2023-present: Dewa United Banten BC

Career highlights
- IBL champion (2025); IBL Rookie of the Year (2024)

Radithyo Wibowo (born 25 April 2005) is an Indonesian professional basketball player for Dewa United Banten BC of the Indonesian Basketball League (IBL). He currently plays college basketball for Multimedia Nusantara University.

== Personal life ==
Wibowo is the nephew of Kelly Purwanto, a former national team player, and a legendary figure in Indonesian basketball history.

== Professional career ==
Wibowo played a total of 20 games in the 2024 IBL season. With 13,9 minutes played, he averaged 4,2 ppg, 2,7 apg, dan 1,5 rpg. His best match was on 10 March 2024 against Satya Wacana Saints, where he played 28 minutes scoring 13 point, 12 assist, and five rebounds, and four steals. With his stats Wibowo won the 2024 IBL Rookie of the Year award.

== National team career ==
Wibowo represented Indonesia men's national under-16 basketball team at the 2022 FIBA Under-16 Asian Championship in Doha, Qatar, Wibowo averaged only 1.7 points and 1 assist in three games.
