= Xavier Ford =

Indonesian-American basketball player (born 2000)

Personal information
- Born: 30 May 2000 (age 26) Pasadena, California, U.S.
- Listed height: 6 ft 3 in (1.91 m)
- Listed weight: 101 kg (223 lb)

Career information
- High school: Maranatha; (Pasadena, California)
- College: Riverside City (2019–2021); Sacramento State (2021–2023)
- Playing career: 2025–present
- Position: Point guard / shooting guard
- Number: 8

Career history
- 2025: Borneo Hornbills

Career highlights
- IBL All-Star (2025)

Xavier Ford (born May 30, 2000) is an American-Indonesian professional basketballer for the Borneo Hornbills of the Indonesian Basketball League (IBL). He played college basketball for the Sacramento State Hornets of the Big Sky Conference.

== Personal life ==
His parents are Charles Ford and Diana Ford and reportedly has Indonesian descent from them. He studied kinesiology at his time in Sacramento State University.

== Professional career ==
After graduation Ford was called up by the Indonesia national team for selection.

=== Borneo Hornbills ===
Ford was rumored to join Satria Muda Pertamina, but the deal never materialized.

On November 26, 2024, the Borneo Hornbills signed Ford, filling in his role as a heritage player.
