= Hardianus Lakudu =

Indonesian basketball player

No. 2 – Dewa United Banten
- Position: Point guard
- League: IBL

Personal information
- Born: 7 March 1992 (age 34) Sangatta, Indonesia
- Listed height: 175 cm (5 ft 9 in)
- Listed weight: 65 kg (143 lb)

Career information
- High school: SMAN 1 (Balikpapan, Indonesia)
- College: STIE Bhakti Pembangunan
- Playing career: 2011–present

Career history
- 2011-2013: Hangtuah Sumsel
- 2013–2023: Satria Muda Pertamina
- 2019-2020: Indonesia Patriots
- 2023-present: Dewa United Banten

Career highlights
- 4× IBL champion (2018, 2021, 2022, 2025); NBL Indonesia champion (2015); IBL Finals MVP (2021); 3× IBL All-Star (2018, 2019, 2022)
Medals
Men's basketball
Representing Indonesia
SEA Games
Gold medal – first place	2021 Vietnam	Team
Silver medal – second place	2017 Kuala Lumpur	Team

Hardianus "Hardy" Lakudu (born March 7, 1992) is an Indonesian professional basketball player for Dewa United Banten of the Indonesian Basketball League (IBL). He has won four championships with the Satria Muda Pertamina, and won the Finals Most Valuable Player award in the 2021 IBL season. In February 2026, Hardianus became the first and only player in IBL history to record 1.000 assists.

== Club career ==
After winning the 2021 Indonesian Basketball League (IBL) Championship and winning the Most Valuable Player award. Hardianus Lakudu became a restricted free agent in summer 2021. SM Pertamina's management had already started talks about a new contract during the season. The club was ready to offer Hardianus a salary raise. Yet, Hardianus' travels with the Indonesian national team and the death of his father delayed the contract extension talks.

== Personal life ==
Lakudu is the older brother of Lucky Abdi Pasondok. They both play for Dewa United Banten.

== National team career ==
He has been a member of the Indonesia national team.

== Career statistics ==
Legend
GP	Games played	GS	Games started	MPG	Minutes per game
FG%	Field goal percentage	3P%	3-point field goal percentage	FT%	Free throw percentage
RPG	Rebounds per game	APG	Assists per game	SPG	Steals per game
BPG	Blocks per game	PPG	Points per game	**Bold**	Career high

†	Denotes seasons in which Lakudu won an IBL championship
*	Led the league

=== NBL/IBL ===
==== Regular season ====
Years	Teams	League	GP	Min	FG%	3P%	FT%	RPG	APG	SPG	BPG	PPG
2014-15	Satria Muda Pertamina Jakarta	NBL	30	-	42.8	27.5	48.9	3.0	3.2	1.0	0.0	5.1

==== Playoffs ====
Years	Teams	League	GP	Min	FG%	3P%	FT%	RPG	APG	SPG	BPG	PPG
2014-15	Satria Muda Pertamina Jakarta	NBL	4	-	27.7	14.2	0.0	3.0	2.2	0.0	0.0	2.7
