= Sahid Kasim =

Indonesian basketball player

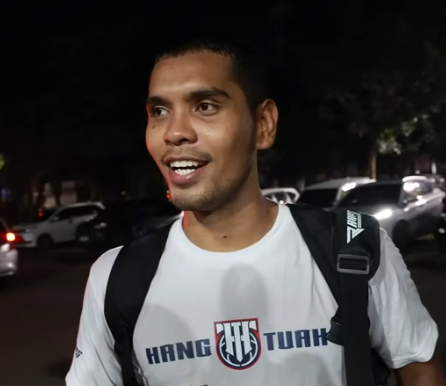
- Sahid in 2026

No. 5 – Hangtuah Jakarta
- Position: Shooting guard
- League: IBL

Personal information
- Born: September 18, 2002 (age 24) Padang, Indonesia
- Listed height: 180 cm (5 ft 11 in)
- Listed weight: 85 kg (187 lb)

Career information
- High school: SMAN 1 Parung (Bogor, Indonesia)
- College: Perbanas Institute (2020-present)
- Playing career: 2024–present

Career history
- 2024-present: Hangtuah Jakarta

Career highlights
- IBL Rookie of the Year (2025)

Sahid Muhamad Abdul Kasim (born September 18, 2002) is an Indonesian professional basketball player for Hangtuah Jakarta of the Indonesian Basketball League (IBL).

== College career ==
Played for the Perbanas Rhinos, represented them during their 2023 World University Basketball Series (WUBS) campaign that was held in Shibuya, Tokyo.

== Professional career ==
In his debut season, Kasim played a total of 22 games for Hangtuah, with 8.5 minutes per game. In that average, he puts up 3.0 points and 1.6 rebounds per game. With his stats, he won the 2025 IBL Rookie of the Year.
