= Januar Kuntara =

Indonesian basketball player

No. 7 – Hangtuah Jakarta
- Position: Point guard
- League: IBL

Personal information
- Born: 10 January 1991 (age 35) Bandung, Indonesia
- Listed height: 173 cm (5 ft 8 in)
- Listed weight: 65 kg (143 lb)

Career information
- High school: SMAN 9 (Bandung, Indonesia)
- College: ITHB (2009-2016)
- Playing career: 2013–present

Career history
- 2013-2014: Satya Wacana Saints
- 2014-2016: Hangtuah Sumsel
- 2016-2021: Garuda Bandung/Prawira Bandung
- 2021-2024: RANS Simba Bogor
- 2024-present: Hangtuah Jakarta / Hangtuah JG Liem

Career highlights
- All-IBL Local Defensive Team (2025)

Januar Kuntara (born January 10, 1991) is an Indonesian professional basketball player for Hangtuah Jakarta of the Indonesian Basketball League (IBL). Januar is known as one of the first generation of RANS Simba Bogor, and has a long history of playing for various IBL teams.
