= Fisyaiful Amir =

Indonesian basketball player

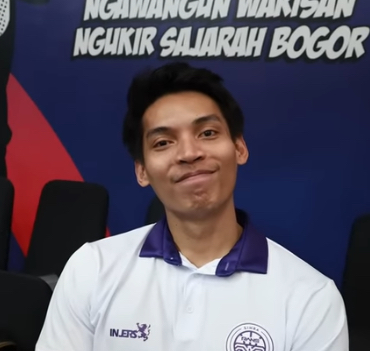
- Fisyaiful in 2026

No. 17 – RANS Simba Bogor
- Position: Shooting guard
- League: IBL

Personal information
- Born: 26 June 1996 (age 30) Lubuk Basung, Indonesia
- Listed height: 183 cm (6 ft 0 in)
- Listed weight: 78 kg (172 lb)

Career information
- High school: SMAN 2 (Lubuk Basung, Indonesia)
- College: Telkom University (2013-2021)
- Playing career: 2018–present

Career history
- 2018-2019: Bogor Siliwangi
- 2019-2025: Amartha Hangtuah
- 2025-present: RANS Simba Bogor

Career highlights
- 2x IBL All-Star (2022, 2025); All-IBL Indonesian Defensive Team (2022); 2× All-IBL Indonesian Second Team (2022, 2024)

Fisyaiful Amir (born June 6, 1996), commonly nicknamed If, is an Indonesian professional basketball player for RANS Simba Bogor of the Indonesian Basketball League (IBL).
