= Rakeem Christmas =

American basketball player (born 1991)

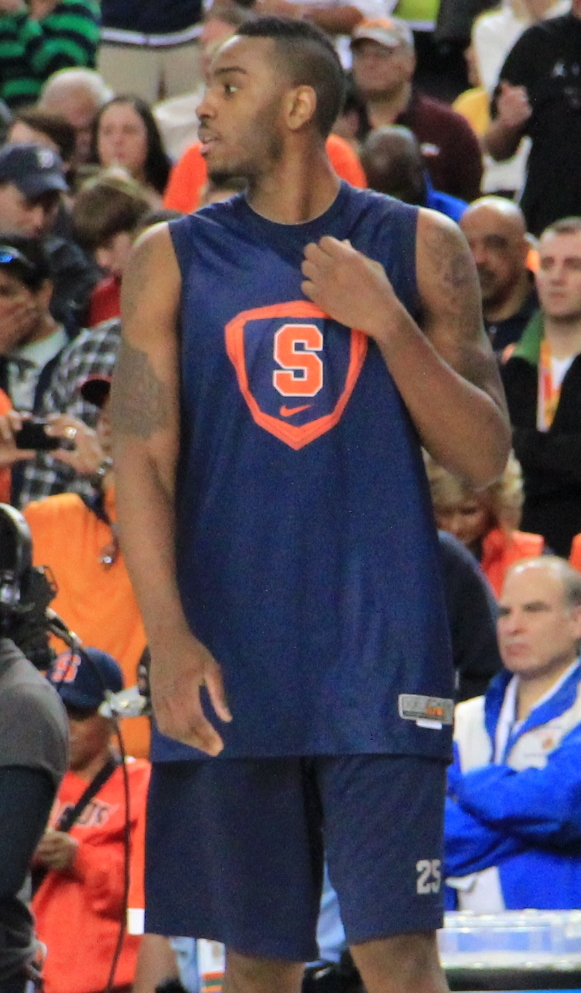
- Christmas with Syracuse in 2013

Free agent
- Position: Power forward / center

Personal information
- Born: December 1, 1991 (age 34) Irvington, New Jersey, U.S.
- Listed height: 6 ft 9 in (2.06 m)
- Listed weight: 250 lb (113 kg)

Career information
- High school: Northeast Catholic (Philadelphia, Pennsylvania); Academy of the New Church (Bryn Athyn, Pennsylvania)
- College: Syracuse (2011–2015)
- NBA draft: 2015: 2nd round, 36th overall pick
- Drafted by: Minnesota Timberwolves
- Playing career: 2015–present

Career history
- 2015–2017: Indiana Pacers
- 2015–2017: →Fort Wayne Mad Ants
- 2017: Galatasaray
- 2018: New Zealand Breakers
- 2018: Henan Shedianlaojiu
- 2019: Capitanes de Arecibo
- 2019: Magnolia Hotshots
- 2019–2020: Ormanspor
- 2020: Mets de Guaynabo
- 2020–2021: Yulon Luxgen Dinos
- 2022: Plaza Fernando Valerio
- 2022: Cangrejeros de Santurce
- 2022: Cocodrilos de Caracas
- 2023: Marineros de Puerto Plata
- 2023: Santos de San Luis
- 2024: Biguá
- 2024: Marineros de Puerto Plata
- 2023: Santos de San Luis
- 2024–2026: Amartha Hangtuah
- 2026: Manama Club

Career highlights
- IBL All-Star (2025); NBA D-League All-Star (2016); Third-team All-American – AP, SN (2015); First-team All-ACC (2015); ACC All-Defensive Team (2015); ACC Most Improved Player (2015); McDonald's All-American (2011)
- Stats at NBA.com
- Stats at Basketball Reference

Rakeem Haleek Christmas (born December 1, 1991) is an American professional basketball player who last played for the Manama Club of the Bahraini Premier League. He played college basketball for the Syracuse Orange for four seasons before being drafted by the Minnesota Timberwolves with the 36th overall pick in the 2015 NBA draft.

After being drafted by the Timberwolves, he was traded to the Cleveland Cavaliers, who then traded him to the Indiana Pacers. He spent two seasons with the Pacers while also playing for their NBA G League team, the Fort Wayne Mad Ants. He was then waived in the 2017 offseason and went overseas to play for Galatasaray in Turkey, the New Zealand Breakers of the National Basketball League (NBL), the Magnolia Hotshots of the Philippine Basketball Association, and Ormanspor in Turkey.

== High school career ==
Christmas attended Northeast Catholic High School in Philadelphia, Pennsylvania between 2007 and 2009, before his junior year he transferred to Academy of the New Church in Bryn Athyn, Pennsylvania. As a junior, he averaged 13.0 points, 7.5 rebounds, and 3.0 blocks per game. During his senior season, he averaged 11.0 points, 9.6 rebounds, and 3.9 blocks per game.

He was rated as the #21 player in the class of 2011 by Scout.com. He was rated as the #27 player by Rivals.com. He was named to the Class A first team as a junior.

== College career ==
Christmas committed to Syracuse basketball on August 6, 2010, after his junior season in high school. He started playing for Syracuse in the 2011–12 season and contributed all four seasons that he was with the team.

=== College statistics ===
Year	GP-GS	MPG	PPG	FG%	RPG	APG	TPG	SPG	BPG
2011–12	37–35	11.5	2.8	57.3%	2.9	0.2	0.6	0.3	0.8
2012–13	40–40	20.8	5.1	53.0%	4.6	0.2	0.9	0.5	1.8
2013–14	34–34	23.6	5.8	61.3%	5.1	0.7	0.8	0.5	1.9
2014–15	31–31	34.3	17.5	55.2%	9.1	1.5	2.5	0.9	2.5

=== College career highs ===
- Blocks: 6 against Loyola (11/25/14)
- Rebounds: 16 against Hampton (11/16/14)
- Points: 35 against Wake Forest (01/13/15)

== Professional career ==
=== Indiana Pacers (2015–2017) ===
On June 25, 2015, Christmas was selected by the Minnesota Timberwolves with the 36th overall pick in the 2015 NBA draft. His rights were then traded to the Cleveland Cavaliers along with those of Cedi Osman and a future second-round pick in exchange for the rights of Tyus Jones. He later joined the Cavaliers for the 2015 NBA Summer League, where he averaged 8.0 points and 4.5 rebounds in four games. On July 23, 2015, his rights were traded again, this time to the Indiana Pacers in exchange for a 2019 second-round pick (Eric Paschall) Indiana acquired for Roy Hibbert. Four days later, he signed with the Pacers. Christmas spent the majority of the 2015–16 season on assignment in the NBA Development League with the Fort Wayne Mad Ants. On January 29, 2016, he was named in the East All-Star team for the 2016 NBA D-League All-Star Game. In the Pacers' 2015–16 regular season finale, Christmas made his NBA debut, scoring four points and making both his field-goal tries off the bench in a 97–92 win over the Milwaukee Bucks. He spent more time with the Pacers in 2016–17, appearing in 29 games, but still received multiple assignments to Fort Wayne.

On July 7, 2017, Christmas was waived by the Pacers.

=== Galatasaray (2017) ===
On August 17, 2017, Christmas signed with Turkish club Galatasaray for the 2017–18 season. On November 11, 2017, he parted ways with Galatasaray.

=== New Zealand Breakers (2018) ===
On January 8, 2018, Christmas signed with the New Zealand Breakers for the rest of the 2017–18 NBL season. In 12 games, he averaged 7.5 points and 5.6 rebounds per game.

=== Magnolia Hotshots (2019) ===
On July 18, 2019, it was reported that Magnolia Hotshots had added Christmas to their roster.

=== Ormanspor (2019–2020) ===
On August 21, 2019, OGM Ormanspor announced that they had added Christmas to their roster.

=== Yulon Dinosours (2020–2021) ===
On November 3, 2020, Yulon Luxgen Dinos announced that they had added Christmas to their roster.

=== Cangrejeros de Santurce (2022) ===
On January 1, 2022, Christmas signed with the Cangrejeros de Santurce of the BSN.

=== Santos del Potosí (2023) ===
On August 5, 2023, Santos del Potosí announced that they had added Christmas to their roster. Christmas was waived by Santos del Potosí on November 3, 2023

=== Amartha Hangtuah (2024–2026) ===
In December 2024, Christmas joined the Amartha Hangtuah of the Indonesian Basketball League (IBL).

== NBA career statistics ==
Legend
GP	Games played	GS	Games started	MPG	Minutes per game
FG%	Field goal percentage	3P%	3-point field goal percentage	FT%	Free throw percentage
RPG	Rebounds per game	APG	Assists per game	SPG	Steals per game
BPG	Blocks per game	PPG	Points per game	**Bold**	Career high

=== Regular season ===
Year	Team	GP	GS	MPG	FG%	3P%	FT%	RPG	APG	SPG	BPG	PPG
2015–16	Indiana	1	0	6.0	**1.000**	.000	.000	1.0	.0	.0	.0	**4.0**
2016–17	Indiana	**29**	0	**7.6**	.442	.000	**.724**	**1.9**	**.1**	**.1**	**.2**	2.0
Career		30	0	7.5	.467	.000	.724	1.9	.1	.1	.2	2.1

== Personal life ==
Christmas and his mother Landra Hamid moved to St. Croix when he was 2 years old. While he lived in the Virgin Islands, his mother died due to kidney failure at the age of 28. After his mother died, he remained in St. Croix and was raised there by his grandmother, Evelyn Hamid. When he was 13 years old he moved to Philadelphia to live with his aunt, Amira Hamid, who became his legal guardian.

Christmas was initiated as an honorary member of the Alpha Epsilon Pi fraternity during his sophomore year at Syracuse. Christmas is thought to be the first player in Syracuse men's basketball history to finish his undergraduate degree in 3 years.

Christmas was married to Jasmine Jordan, the daughter of Michael Jordan. Their son, Rakeem Michael Christmas, was born in May 2019.

He welcomed his second child in 2024 with Instagram influencer Ariel Ramage.
