= Lester Prosper =

British Virgin Islands-Indonesian basketball player

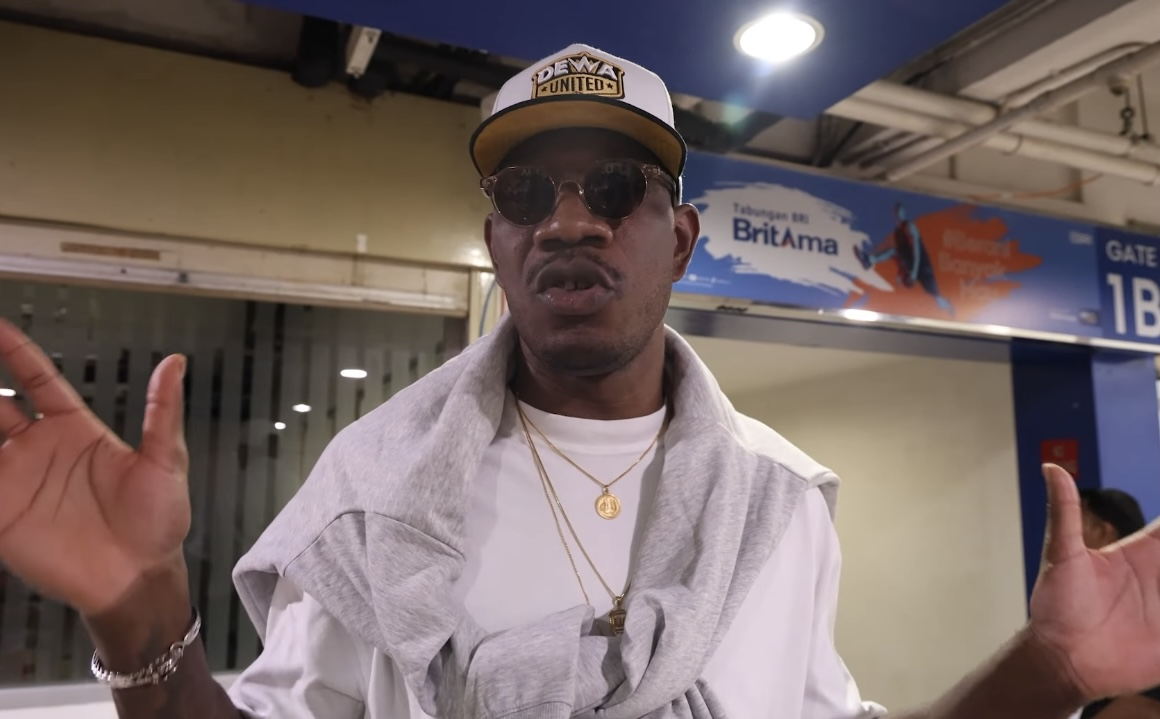
- Prosper in 2024

Dewa United Banten
- Position: Center

Personal information
- Born: 21 September 1988 (age 38) Roseau, Dominica
- Listed height: 2.09 m (6 ft 10 in)
- Listed weight: 233 lb (106 kg)

Career information
- High school: Mepham (North Bellmore, New York)
- College: SUNY Old Westbury (2007–2011)
- NBA draft: 2010: undrafted
- Playing career: 2011–present
- Number: 32
- Coaching career: 2025–present

Career history

Playing
- 2011: Norrköping Dolphins
- 2011: BC Prievidza
- 2011–2012: MBK Handlová
- 2012: Moncton Miracles
- 2012–2013: Windsor Express
- 2013: Oshawa Power
- 2013–2014: Al Wehda FC
- 2014: Caribbean Heat de Cartagena
- 2014: Cheshire Phoenix
- 2014: Araberri BC
- 2014: San Lazaro baloncesto
- 2016: Trigueros de Ciudad Obregón
- 2016–2017: Windsor Express
- 2017: Rafael Barias
- 2017: Gaiteros del Zulia
- 2017–2018: Panteras de Costa del Este Panama City
- 2018–2019: Worcester Wolves
- 2019: Columbian Dyip
- 2019: San Miguel Beermen
- 2020: Indonesia Patriots
- 2021: Halcones de Xalapa
- 2022: Tainan TSG GhostHawks
- 2022: Terrafirma Dyip
- 2022–2023: Suwon KT Sonicboom
- 2023: Dynamo Lebanon
- 2023–present: Dewa United Banten

Coaching
- 2025–present: Dewa United Banten BC Academy

Career highlights
- 2x IBL All-Star MVP (2024, 2025); All-IBL Defensive Team (2025); 3× IBL All-Star (2020, 2024, 2025); IBL champion (2025); IBL Sportmanship Award (2025)

Lester Prosper (born September 21, 1988) is a Dominican-born British Virgin Islands-Indonesian professional basketball player who plays for Dewa United Banten of the Indonesian Basketball League (IBL). He played college basketball for the SUNY Old Westbury Panthers.

== College career ==
Lester Prosper played four years with the State University of New York College at Old Westbury in the NCAA Division III.

== Professional career ==
Prosper was drafted in the 6th round of the 2013 NBA Development League draft by the Maine Red Claws.

Altogether, Prosper played in 12 countries before suiting up for Columbian in the Philippine Basketball Association in 2019. He recorded a career-high 45 points in a 123–127 loss to the Barangay Ginebra San Miguel. He also played for San Miguel Beer in the Terrific 12 in Macau that year.

On March 20, 2022, Prosper signed with the Tainan TSG GhostHawks of the T1 League.

== National team career ==
On November 12, 2020, Prosper became citizen of Indonesia. He has been a part of Indonesia's national basketball team at the 2021 FIBA Asia Cup qualification. At his home country's 90–76 victory against Thailand, Prosper collected 19 points and 13 rebounds.

On 2026, he was called for the 2026 Asian Games. On August 20, 2026, he played a scrimmage game against Pelita Jaya to help his national team won by 82–63.

== Personal life ==
Prosper was born in Dominica, moved to Montserrat when he was 11, then moved to the United States two years later.
