= Neo Putu Pande =

Indonesian-New Zealand basketball player

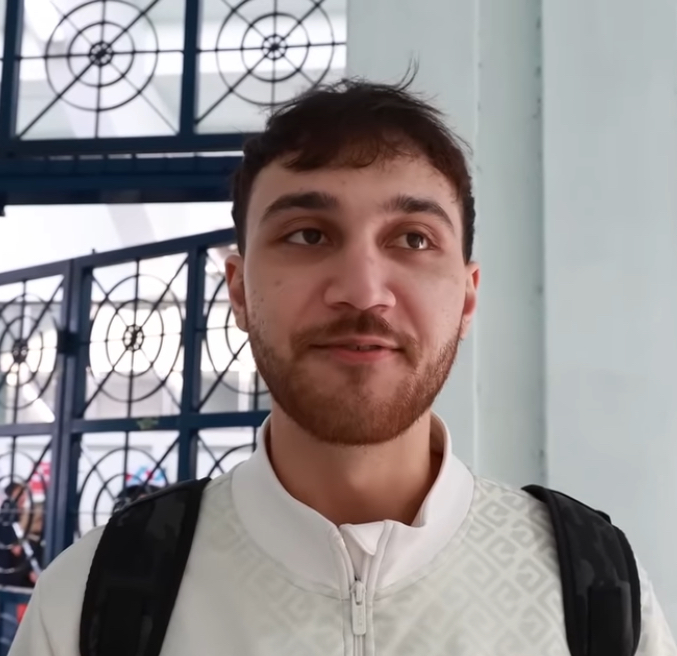
- Neo with Indonesia in 2025

No. 24 – Pelita Jaya
- Position: Center / power forward
- League: IBL

Personal information
- Born: 5 February 2001 (age 25) Bali, Indonesia
- Listed height: 196 cm (6 ft 5 in)
- Listed weight: 90 kg (198 lb)

Career information
- High school: Sekolah Dyatmika (Denpasar, Indonesia)
- Playing career: 2020–present

Career history
- 2020-2022: Indonesia Patriots
- 2022-2025: Bali United Basketball
- 2025-present: Pelita Jaya

Career highlights
- IBL All-Star (2025); IBL Most Improved Player of the Year (2025)
Medals
Men's basketball
Representing Indonesia
Southeast Asian Games
Bronze medal – third place	2025 Thailand	Team

Neo Putu James Satria Pande (born February, 5 2001) is an Indonesian professional basketball player for Pelita Jaya Bakrie of the Indonesian Basketball League (IBL). He is of New Zealand descent.

== Career ==
In Neo's second season with the Indonesia Patriots (2022), he was called up by the national team for the 2023 FIBA Basketball World Cup qualification training camp.

In 2025, Neo was called up by the national team for the 2025 SEA Games.

He played 25 matches in the 2025 season, averaging 7,5 PPG, 7,0 RPG, 1,6 APG and 1,0 steals per game. In the prior season, Neo played five times averaging 1,4 PPG and 2,0 RPG, He won the Most Improved Player award.
