= Bali United Basketball =

- 2025 IBL Indonesia
- Leagues: IBL; 2020–2025
- Founded: 2020
- Dissolved: 2025
- Arena: GOR Purna Krida
- Capacity: 6,000
- Location: Denpasar, Bali
- Team colors: Red, White, and Black
- President: Philmon Tanuri
- Head coach: Anthony Garbelotto
- Ownership: Bali United F.C.
- Website: basket.baliutd.com
Home	Away

Bali United Basketball is an Indonesian former professional basketball team that played in the Indonesian Basketball League (IBL). The team is based in the city of Denpasar.

== Ownership ==
Bali United Basketball is under the ownership of Liga 1 club Bali United F.C.

== Last roster (2024-25) ==
Bali United Basketball roster
Players
Coaches

Pos.	No.	Nat.	Name	Ht.	Wt.
F	0	(Indonesia)	A. A. Gede Agung Bagus Paramesvara	1.94 m (6 ft 4 in)	83 kg (183 lb)
F/C	11	(Indonesia)	Alkristian Chandra	1.95 m (6 ft 5 in)	90 kg (198 lb)
F	17	(Indonesia)	Bima Riski Ardiansyah	1.82 m (6 ft 0 in)	88 kg (194 lb)
F/C	28	(Indonesia)	Rivaldo Tomatalo (R)	1.94 m (6 ft 4 in)	70 kg (154 lb)
C	66	(Indonesia)	Galank Gunawan	1.98 m (6 ft 6 in)	95 kg (209 lb)
G	1	(United States)	Xavier Cannefax	1.91 m (6 ft 3 in)	84 kg (185 lb)
G	7	(Indonesia)	Gede Elgi Wimbardi	1.78 m (5 ft 10 in)	66 kg (146 lb)
G	10	(Indonesia)	Irvine Kurniawan	1.73 m (5 ft 8 in)	72 kg (159 lb)
G	5	(Indonesia)	Lutfi Alfian Eka Koswara	1.84 m (6 ft 0 in)	82 kg (181 lb)
F	24	(Indonesia)	Neo Putu Pande	1.96 m (6 ft 5 in)	91 kg (201 lb)
F	8	(Indonesia)	Rico Aditya Putra	1.96 m (6 ft 5 in)	85 kg (187 lb)
F	52	(Indonesia)	Surliyadin	1.88 m (6 ft 2 in)	80 kg (176 lb)
F	44	(United States)	Ryan Taylor Batte (injured)	1.98 m (6 ft 6 in)	100 kg (220 lb)
F/C	15	(Japan)	Reo Sakai (HP)	1.96 m (6 ft 5 in)	102 kg (225 lb)

Head coach

- (England) Anthony Garbelotto

Assistant coach(es)

- (Indonesia) I Gusti Rusta Wijaya
- (Indonesia) I Gusti Ngurah Teguh
- (Indonesia) Asep Nugroho

Legend

- (C) Team captain
- (HP) Heritage player
- (R) Rookie
- Injured

- Roster
Updated: 11 January 2024,

== Notable alumni ==
- (Indonesia) Daniel Wenas
- (United States) Dior Lowhorn
- (United States) Julius Bowie
- (Indonesia) Tri Hartanto
- (Indonesia) Abraham Wenas
- (Indonesia) Ponsianus Nyoman Indrawan
- (Indonesia) Surliyadin
- (Indonesia) Neo Putu Pande
- (Indonesia) Galank Gunawan
