= Jose Alvarado (basketball) =

American basketball player (born 1998)

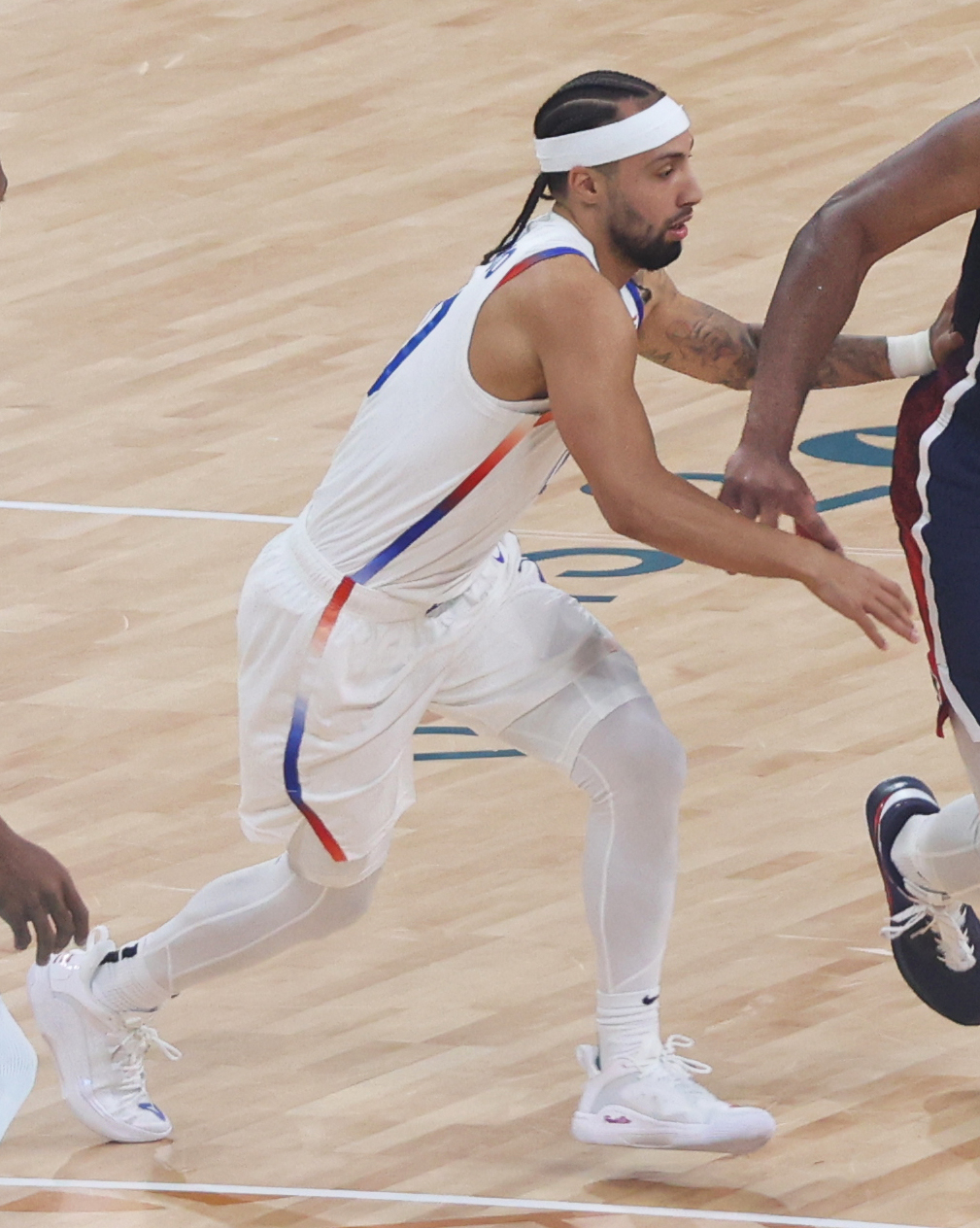
- Alvarado with the Puerto Rico national team in 2024

No. 5 – New York Knicks
- Position: Point guard
- League: NBA

Personal information
- Born: April 12, 1998 (age 28) Brooklyn, New York, U.S.
- Listed height: 6 ft 0 in (1.83 m)
- Listed weight: 179 lb (81 kg)

Career information
- High school: Christ the King (Middle Village, New York)
- College: Georgia Tech (2017–2021)
- NBA draft: 2021: undrafted
- Playing career: 2021–present

Career history
- 2021–2026: New Orleans Pelicans
- 2021: →Birmingham Squadron
- 2026–present: New York Knicks

Career highlights
- NBA champion (2026); ACC Defensive Player of the Year (2021); Second-team All-ACC (2021); Third-team All-ACC (2020)
- Stats at NBA.com
- Stats at Basketball Reference

Jose Alvarado (born April 12, 1998) is an American professional basketball player for the New York Knicks of the National Basketball Association (NBA) since 2026. He is nicknamed "Grand Theft Alvarado" for his exceptional ability to generate steals, as well as his defensive prowess. Before joining the NBA, he played college basketball for the Georgia Tech Yellow Jackets from 2017 to 2021. Since 2022, he has also represented Puerto Rico in international competitions, including the 2024 Summer Olympics. When the Knicks beat the Spurs in the 2026 NBA Finals, he became the third Puerto Rican to win a championship, after Butch Lee with the Los Angeles Lakers in 1980, and J. J. Barea with the Dallas Mavericks in 2011. He is currently the only native New Yorker on the Knicks' roster.

== Early life ==
Alvarado was born in Brooklyn. His father, Jose Alvarado Sr., is an electrician of Puerto Rican descent and his mother, Odilia Martinez, is of Mexican descent and was a stay-at-home mom. He lived in Lindsay Park in Williamsburg, Brooklyn and the Pomonok Houses public housing project in Pomonok, Queens. Alvarado played football in his childhood but quit after injuring his neck. He attended PS 200 in Queens for elementary school and played Catholic Youth Organization basketball at St Ann's in Flushing, Queens. He has stated that this experience, provided by his parents, is where his passion for the game developed.

He later played basketball for Christ the King Regional High School in Middle Village, Queens, in New York City. As a junior, Alvarado averaged 17 points and 6.5 assists per game and was named Catholic High School Athletic Association (CHSAA) Player of the Year. As a senior, he recorded 18 points, 10 rebounds, 10 assists and 10 steals, the first quadruple-double in school history, in a December 22, 2016, win over Xaverian High School. In his senior season, Alvarado averaged 17.9 points per game and led Christ the King to the CHSAA intersectional quarterfinals. He was named TimesLedger Player of the Year.

Alvarado was considered a four-star recruit by ESPN and a three-star recruit by 247Sports.com in the 2017 class.

In September 2016, he committed to play college basketball for Georgia Tech over offers from Rutgers and Seton Hall, among others. Georgia Tech head coach Josh Pastner had first seen Alvarado at the Nike Elite Youth Basketball League.

College recruiting
Name	Hometown	School	Height	Weight	Commit date
Jose Alvarado; PG	Brooklyn, NY	Christ the King (NY)	6 ft 1 in (1.85 m)	160 lb (73 kg)	Sep 15, 2016
Jose Alvarado; PG	Recruit ratings: 247Sports: ESPN: (80)				
Overall recruit ranking: Rivals: 130 247Sports: 179 ESPN: —
Note: In many cases, Scout, Rivals, 247Sports, On3, and ESPN may conflict in their listings of height and weight.; In these cases, the average was taken. ESPN grades are on a 100-point scale.; Sources: "Georgia Tech 2017 Basketball Commitments". Rivals.; "2017 Georgia Tech Yellow Jackets Recruiting Class". ESPN.; "2017 Team Ranking". Rivals.com.

== College career ==
As a freshman, Alvarado started in all 25 of his games and averaged 12.1 points, 3.7 rebounds and 3.1 assists per game. He became the fourth Georgia Tech freshman to average at least 12 points, 3.5 rebounds, and two assists per game. He suffered a season-ending left elbow fracture against Duke on February 11, 2018. Alvarado had an increased role in his sophomore season with the early departure of Josh Okogie. On February 20, 2019, Alvarado scored a career-high 29 points to go with 6 rebounds and 5 assists in a 73–65 win over Pittsburgh. As a sophomore, Alvarado averaged 12.5 points, 3.9 rebounds and 3.4 assists per game, leading his team in scoring, assists and steals. Georgia Tech was banned from the postseason by the NCAA during his junior season due to several infractions. He missed seven games early in his junior season due to an ankle injury. On January 25, 2020, Alvarado scored a season-high 26 points and recorded 8 rebounds and a school-record nine steals in a 64–58 victory over NC State. In his junior season, he averaged 14.4 points, four assists, 3.4 rebounds and 2.2 steals per game and was named to the Third Team All-Atlantic Coast Conference (ACC). In his senior year, Alvarado and Moses Wright led Georgia Tech to its first ACC title since 1993, by defeating Scottie Barnes and Florida State in the championship game of the ACC tournament. At the end of the season, he was named the ACC Defensive Player of the Year.

Alvarado graduated from Georgia Tech in 2021 with a degree in literature, media and communications.

== Professional career ==
=== New Orleans Pelicans / Birmingham Squadron (2021–2026) ===
Alvarado passed on gaining an additional year in college due to COVID-19 game cancellations and declared himself eligible for the 2021 NBA draft. After being undrafted, on August 19, 2021, he signed a two-way contract with the New Orleans Pelicans. Under the terms of the deal, he split time with the Pelicans and their NBA G League affiliate, the Birmingham Squadron. During a game against the Philadelphia 76ers on January 25, 2022, Alvarado was issued a technical foul after an in-game verbal altercation with Philadelphia center Joel Embiid. Embiid praised Alvarado and paid the associated $2,000 league fine. On March 28, Alvarado's two-way deal was converted into a standard four-year, $6.5 million contract. This signing made him eligible for post-season play.

In 2022, Alvarado gained social media traction for highlight clips of him creating steals by sneaking up behind the opposing team's ball handler, which also led to his nickname "Grand Theft Alvarado".

On December 4, 2022, Alvarado scored a career-high 38 points in a 121–106 win over the Denver Nuggets. On February 17, 2023, he won the Rising Stars Challenge MVP award after hitting the game-winning shot. On February 28, Alvarado suffered a stress reaction in his right tibia. On March 22, the Pelicans announced that Alvarado would be sidelined for at least another two-to-three weeks, ending his season.

Alvarado made 56 appearances off of the bench for New Orleans during the 2023–24 NBA season, posting averages of 7.1 points, 2.3 rebounds, 2.1 assists, and 1.1 steals. On September 28, 2024, Alvarado signed a two-year, $9 million contract extension with New Orleans. He played in 56 games (including 23 starts) for the Pelicans during the 2024–25 season, averaging career-highs in points (10.3), rebounds (2.4), assists (4.6), and steals (1.3).

Alvarado played in 41 games for the Pelicans during the 2025–26 season, averaging 7.9 points, 2.8 rebounds, and 3.1 assists.

=== New York Knicks (2026–present) ===
On February 5, 2026, Alvarado was traded to the New York Knicks in exchange for Dalen Terry and two future second round draft picks. As a native New Yorker returning home, Alvarado immediately endeared himself to Knicks fans through his energy, hustle, and active defense. Within a week, at a February 11 away game against the Philadelphia 76ers, Alvarado became the first player in Knicks franchise history to record 25+ points, 5+ steals, and 5+ three-pointers in a game off the bench. Alvarado scored 26 points and made 8 of his 13 three-point attempts, leading to a 138-89 victory for the Knicks over the 76ers.

After playing sparingly in the 2026 NBA Finals, Alvarado suited up for Game 4 of the Finals. In the game, Alvarado played a key role off the bench. He played most of the 4th quarter and hit multiple three-point shots, including scoring five straight Knick points to keep the Spurs from pulling away, thus, helping the Knicks come back from down 29 points, the largest comeback win in NBA Finals history. In the game, Alvarado tallied 8 points, 3 rebounds, and 2 assists in 16 minutes of play time. In Game 5 of the NBA Finals, Alvarado helped the Knicks achieve a 94–90 win and close out the NBA Finals against the San Antonio Spurs, 4–1, securing the Knicks' first NBA championship in 53 years.

On June 26, 2026, Alvarado declined his $4.5 million player option and re-signed with the Knicks on a three-year, $14 million contract.

== National team career ==
Although a native of Brooklyn, Alvarado represents Puerto Rico at the international level due to his Puerto Rican ancestry. Alvarado was recruited in 2022 by Carlos Arroyo, retired team captain and current general manager. He was part of the team that helped Puerto Rico qualify for the 2024 Summer Olympics after defeating both Mexico in the semifinals and Lithuania in the final of one of four 2024 FIBA Men's Olympic Qualifying Tournaments. He was named MVP of the tournament after he averaged 16.0 points, 3.8 rebounds, 3.0 assists and 2.3 steals, and had a 29-point performance against Italy and 23 points against Lithuania.

Alvarado plays mainly as a shooting guard for the national team.

== Career statistics ==
Legend
GP	Games played	GS	Games started	MPG	Minutes per game
FG%	Field goal percentage	3P%	3-point field goal percentage	FT%	Free throw percentage
RPG	Rebounds per game	APG	Assists per game	SPG	Steals per game
BPG	Blocks per game	PPG	Points per game	**Bold**	Career high
†	Won an NBA championship

=== NBA ===
==== Regular season ====
Year	Team	GP	GS	MPG	FG%	3P%	FT%	RPG	APG	SPG	BPG	PPG
2021–22	New Orleans	54	1	15.4	**.446**	.291	.679	1.9	2.8	**1.3**	.1	6.1
2022–23	New Orleans	**61**	10	21.5	.411	.336	.813	2.3	3.0	1.1	.2	9.0
2023–24	New Orleans	56	0	18.4	.412	**.377**	.673	2.3	2.1	1.1	**.3**	7.1
2024–25	New Orleans	56	**23**	**24.4**	.392	.359	.811	2.4	**4.6**	**1.3**	**.3**	**10.3**
2025–26†	New Orleans	41	0	21.9	.418	.363	**.833**	**2.8**	3.1	.9	.1	7.9
2025–26†	New York	28	3	16.9	.414	.330	.682	2.0	3.8	1.0	.1	6.6
Career		296	37	20.0	.412	.349	.757	2.3	3.2	1.1	.2	8.0

==== Playoffs ====
Year	Team	GP	GS	MPG	FG%	3P%	FT%	RPG	APG	SPG	BPG	PPG
2022	New Orleans	6	0	**19.5**	**.485**	**.375**	.769	1.3	1.5	1.2	.2	**8.0**
2024	New Orleans	4	0	15.4	.150	.071	—	1.0	**2.3**	**1.3**	**.3**	1.8
2026†	New York	**18**	0	9.4	.433	.353	**.833**	**1.4**	1.2	.6	.2	4.2
Career		28	0	12.5	.400	.297	.789	1.3	1.4	.8	.1	4.6

=== College ===
Year	Team	GP	GS	MPG	FG%	3P%	FT%	RPG	APG	SPG	BPG	PPG
2017–18	Georgia Tech	25	25	35.0	.448	.370	.802	3.7	3.1	1.7	**.1**	12.1
2018–19	Georgia Tech	**31**	**30**	34.2	.392	.286	.743	**3.9**	3.4	1.8	**.1**	12.5
2019–20	Georgia Tech	24	23	33.5	.444	.336	.793	3.4	4.0	2.2	**.1**	14.4
2020–21	Georgia Tech	26	26	**37.1**	**.504**	**.390**	**.838**	3.5	**4.1**	**2.8**	.0	**15.2**
Career		106	104	34.9	.444	.341	.790	3.6	3.6	2.1	.1	13.5

== Personal life ==
He and his girlfriend, Flor Castillo, have two daughters, Nazanin "Naz" and Brooklyn, and a son born September 2026, named Romeo Jett. He bought a house in Atlanta, where he attended college, becoming the first person in his family to own real estate. In October 2026, Alvarado recorded public service announcements for MTA New York City Transit's Subway system.

== See also ==
- List of All-Atlantic Coast Conference men's basketball teams
