= Tri Hartanto =

Indonesian basketball player

Free agent
- Position: Center

Personal information
- Born: 29 October 1989 (age 37) Boyolali, Indonesia
- Listed height: 1.97 m (6 ft 6 in)
- Listed weight: 229 lb (104 kg)

Career information
- Playing career: 2012–2025

Career history
- 2012–2014: Satya Wacana Saints
- 2014–2018: Pelita Jaya
- 2018–2019: NSH Mountain Gold Timika
- 2019–2020: Pelita Jaya
- 2020–2022: Bali United Basketball
- 2022-2023: Evos Thunder Bogor
- 2023-2024: Amartha Hangtuah
- 2024-2025: Borneo Hornbills / Bogor Basketball

Career highlights
- IBL champion (2017)

Tri Hartanto (born October 29, 1989) is an Indonesian professional basketball player for the Borneo Hornbills of the Indonesian Basketball League (IBL). During his time with Pelita Jaya Bakrie, he was part of the IBL championship team of the 2017 season.

== Club career ==
Tri Hartanto joined Bali United under head coach Aleksandar Stefanovski in November 2020. Before that, he had played for Pelita Jaya.

He joined his new team shortly after Yerikho Tuasela from Pacific Caesar Surabaya and Suriliyadin from Prawira Bandung.

== National team career ==
Tri Hartanto capped for the Indonesian national basketball team on several occasions such as the William Jones Cup.
