= JaQuori McLaughlin =

American basketball player (born 1998)

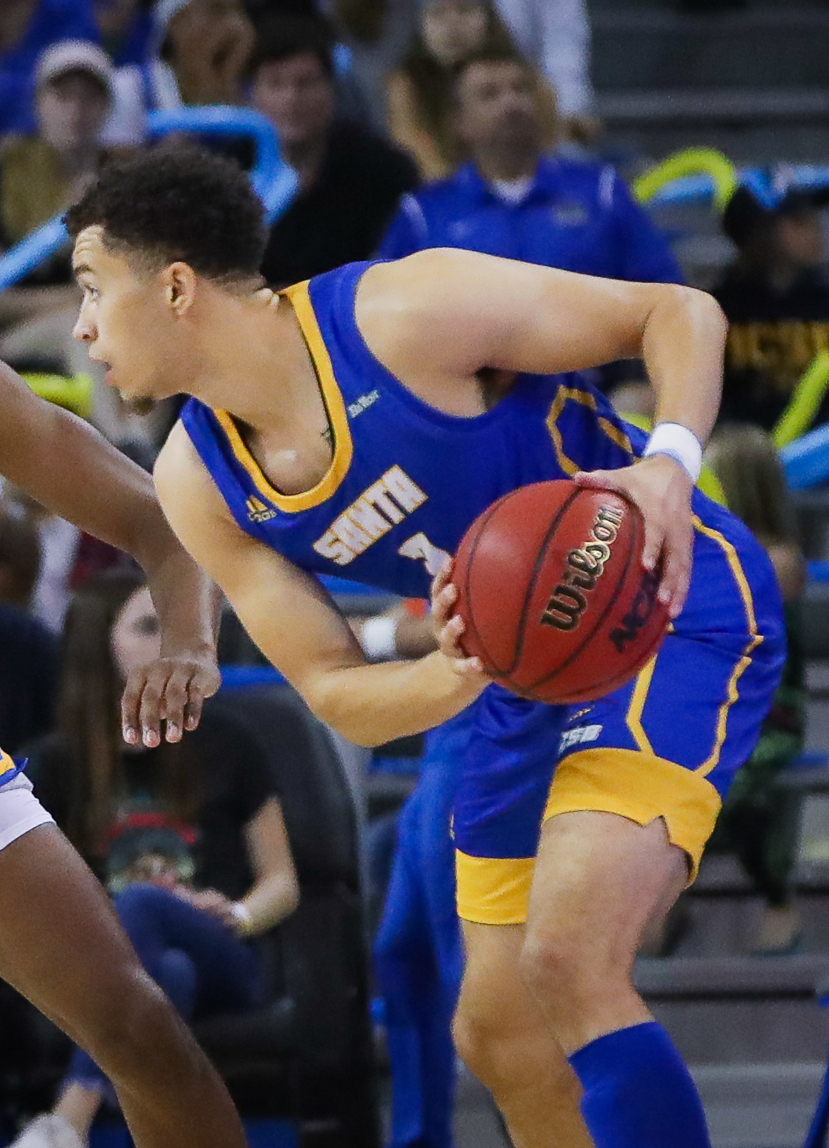
- McLaughlin with UC Santa Barbara in 2019

Free agent
- Position: Point guard

Personal information
- Born: January 29, 1998 (age 28) Port Angeles, Washington, U.S.
- Listed height: 6 ft 4 in (1.93 m)
- Listed weight: 190 lb (86 kg)

Career information
- High school: Peninsula (Gig Harbor, Washington)
- College: Oregon State (2016–2017); UC Santa Barbara (2018–2021)
- NBA draft: 2021: undrafted
- Playing career: 2021–present

Career history
- 2021–2022: Dallas Mavericks
- 2021–2022: →Texas Legends
- 2022–2023: Santa Cruz Warriors
- 2023: Otago Nuggets
- 2024–2025: Pelita Jaya
- 2025: Illawarra Hawks
- 2025–2026: Valley Suns

Career highlights
- All-IBL Second Team (2025); IBL All-Star (2025); Honorable Mention All-American – AP (2021); Big West Player of the Year (2021); First-team All-Big West (2021); Big West tournament MVP (2021); Washington Mr. Basketball (2016)
- Stats at NBA.com
- Stats at Basketball Reference

JaQuori McLaughlin (born January 29, 1998) is an American professional basketball player who last played for the Valley Suns of the NBA G League. He played college basketball for the Oregon State Beavers and the UC Santa Barbara Gauchos.

== Early life ==
McLaughlin attended Peninsula High School in Gig Harbor, Washington. He averaged 19.3 points, 9.1 assists and 5.5 steals per game as a senior and was named Washington Mr. Basketball. McLaughlin left as the school's all-time leader in points, assists and three-pointers. He had originally committed to playing college basketball for Oregon State before switching his commitment to Washington. He later recommitted to Oregon State over offers from Utah and Wisconsin.

== College career ==
As a freshman at Oregon State, McLaughlin averaged 10.5 points and 3.3 assists per game. He set a program freshman record with 58 three-pointers. Before his second year, McLaughlin began suffering from post-traumatic stress disorder after witnessing a terrorist attack during his team's summer trip to Spain. Six games into the season, he left the team. McLaughlin was granted a redshirt and transferred to UC Santa Barbara. He averaged 10.3 points and 3.2 assists per game as a sophomore. In his junior season, he averaged 13.4 points and 4.1 assists per game. McLaughlin was named to the All-Big West Honorable Mention. As a senior, he averaged 16 points, 5.2 assists, 3.5 rebounds and 1.5 steals per game, helping UC Santa Barbara win the Big West regular season and tournament title. McLaughlin was named Big West Player of the Year as well as Big West tournament MVP. Following the season, McLaughlin declared for the 2021 NBA draft forgoing his extra season of eligibility.

== Professional career ==
=== Dallas Mavericks (2021–2022) ===
After going undrafted in the 2021 NBA draft, McLaughlin played for the Golden State Warriors in the NBA Summer League. On September 4, 2021, he signed a two-way contract with the Dallas Mavericks. Under the terms of the deal, he split time between the Mavs and their NBA G League affiliate, the Texas Legends. He was waived by the Mavericks on January 10, 2022, after appearing in four NBA games.

=== Santa Cruz Warriors (2022–2023) ===
On January 14, 2022, McLaughlin was acquired in a trade by the Santa Cruz Warriors of the NBA G League. However, he was waived on February 26, after suffering a season-ending quad injury.

In October 2022, McLaughlin re-joined the Santa Cruz Warriors for the 2022–23 season.

=== Otago Nuggets (2023) ===
On March 31, 2023, McLaughlin signed with the Otago Nuggets for the 2023 New Zealand NBL season. He played his last game for the Nuggets on May 18 due to a knee injury.

=== Pelita Jaya (2024–2025) ===
In March 2024, McLaughlin joined Pelita Jaya for the 2024 Basketball Champions League Asia. In December 2024, he returned to Pelita Jaya for the 2025 Indonesian Basketball League (IBL) season. He was named to the 2025 All-IBL Second Team.

=== Illawarra Hawks (2025) ===
On September 4, 2025, McLaughlin signed with the Illawarra Hawks of the Australian National Basketball League (NBL) for the 2025–26 season. On October 10, he was released by the Hawks after averaging 7.7 points and 4 assists across three games.

== Career statistics ==
Legend
GP	Games played	GS	Games started	MPG	Minutes per game
FG%	Field goal percentage	3P%	3-point field goal percentage	FT%	Free throw percentage
RPG	Rebounds per game	APG	Assists per game	SPG	Steals per game
BPG	Blocks per game	PPG	Points per game	**Bold**	Career high

=== NBA ===
==== Regular season ====
Year	Team	GP	GS	MPG	FG%	3P%	FT%	RPG	APG	SPG	BPG	PPG
2021–22	Dallas	4	0	2.8	.000	.000	.000	.0	.5	.0	.0	.0
Career		4	0	2.8	.000	.000	.000	.0	.5	.0	.0	.0

=== College ===
Year	Team	GP	GS	MPG	FG%	3P%	FT%	RPG	APG	SPG	BPG	PPG
2016–17	Oregon State	**32**	30	33.8	.383	.367	.743	2.2	3.3	.8	.3	10.5
2017–18	Oregon State	6	5	26.0	.238	.000	**1.000**	2.7	3.7	**1.5**	**.5**	2.7
2018–19	UC Santa Barbara	**32**	**32**	32.3	.360	.343	.763	2.8	3.2	.8	.2	10.3
2019–20	UC Santa Barbara	30	30	**34.2**	.444	.407	.799	3.3	4.1	1.0	.2	13.4
2020–21	UC Santa Barbara	26	26	32.3	**.488**	**.408**	.832	**3.5**	**5.2**	**1.5**	.2	**16.0**
Career		126	123	32.8	.415	.370	.794	2.9	3.9	1.0	.2	11.9

== Personal life ==
As of 2021, McLaughlin's father, Jason, serves as an assistant basketball coach at Tacoma Community College, where his younger brother, Elijah, plays the point guard position.
