= Karl Gloria =

Indonesian-Filipino basketball player

Satria Muda Bandung
- Position: Shooting guard
- League: IBL

Personal information
- Born: January 11, 2003 (age 23) Philippines
- Listed height: 192 cm (6 ft 4 in)
- Listed weight: 75 kg (165 lb)

Career information
- Playing career: 2023–present

Career history
- 2023: Indonesia Patriots
- 2023: RANS Simba Bogor
- 2023–2026: Satria Muda Bandung
- 2026: GenSan Warriors
- 2026–present: Satria Muda Bandung

Career highlights
- IBL All Indonesian Cup champion (2025)

Karl Patrick Utiarahman Gloria (born January 11, 2003) is an Indonesian professional basketball player for the Satria Muda Bandung of the Indonesian Basketball League (IBL).

== Early life ==
Karl Gloria was born in the Philippines on January 11, 2003 to a Filipino father and an Indonesian mother, the latter being a native of Bitung, North Sulawesi. He spent his childhood growing up in the Philippines. His connection to the Philippines is rooted in General Santos City.

== High school and college ==
Gloria was part of the National University (NU) system. In high school, he was part of the NU Bullpups. However he did not suit up for the main team which played in the University Athletic Association of the Philippines (UAAP). Instead he was part of the team B which played in various tournaments such as the Pilipinas Chinese Amateur Basketball League, Metro Manila Basketball League, and the Philippine Athletic Youth Association Juniors.

For college, Gloria was elevated to the seniors program, the NU Bulldogs, in 2021.

== Professional career ==
=== Satria Muda ===
On October 14, 2023, Gloria joins Satria Muda Pertamina.

At September 24, 2024, Gloria dropped 20 points in the IBL All-Indonesian Cup, in a 98–60 win against Pacific Caesar.

On March 6, 2026, Satria Muda Bandung released Gloria due to violations to the club's code of conduct.

== National team career ==
Gloria obtained his Indonesian identity card in November 2022, as part of his documentary requirements to suit up for the Indonesia national team. He later debuted for the national team at the 2022 Asian Games which was held in 2023 in Hangzhou, China.
