= Agassi Goantara =

Indonesian basketball player

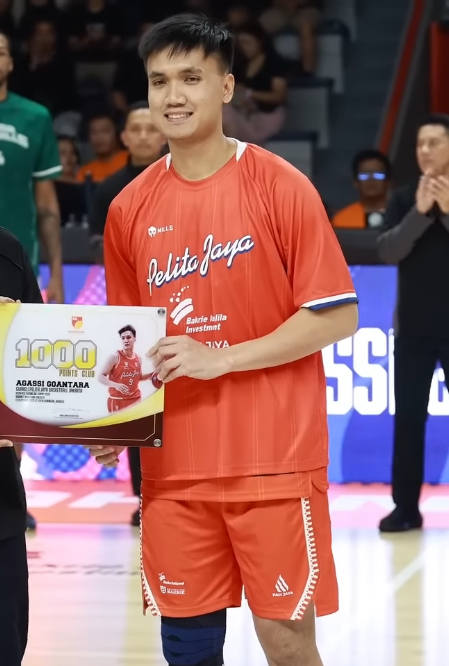
- Agassi with Pelita Jaya in 2026

No. 9 – Pelita Jaya
- Position: Shooting guard / point guard
- League: IBL

Personal information
- Born: October 17, 1999 (age 27) Tangerang, Indonesia
- Listed height: 187 cm (6 ft 2 in)
- Listed weight: 84 kg (185 lb)

Career information
- High school: Walnut (Walnut, California)
- College: La Verne; Universidad Católica San Antonio de Murcia
- Playing career: 2018–present

Career history
- 2018-2020: Stapac Jakarta
- 2020-2021: CB Alhama Baloncesto
- 2021–present: Pelita Jaya
- 2022: AD Infante Murcia

Career highlights
- 2× IBL champion (2019, 2024); IBL Local Most Valuable Player (2025); IBL All-Star (2026); All-IBL Indonesian First Team (2025); All-IBL Local Defensive Team (2025); 2× All-IBL Indonesian Second Team (2021, 2026); IBL Three-point Contest champion (2026); All-IBL Rookie Team (2019); IBL Rookie of the Year (2019)
Medals
Men's basketball
Representing Indonesia
2021 FIBA Asia Cup SEABA Pre-Qualifier
Gold medal – first place	2018 Nonthaburi	Team
SEA Games
Gold medal – first place	2021 Vietnam	Team
Bronze medal – third place	2025 Thailand	Team

Agassi Yeshe Goantara (born October 17, 1999) is an Indonesian professional basketball player for the Pelita Jaya Bakrie of the Indonesian Basketball League (IBL). He played college basketball for the La Verne Leopards, and has since been the only Indonesian that has played professionally in Spain, he also represented Indonesia national basketball team for the 2018 Asian Games 3X3.

== Early career ==
Agassi was born and raised in Tangerang, a city located in the west outskirt of Jakarta. He moved to the United States in 2015 during his sophomore year of high school. He attended Walnut High School in Walnut, California and was a member of their varsity basketball team during his three-year tenure. During his sophomore year, Agassi did not get much playing time as he finished the year averaging 2.9 points, 1.6 rebounds and 0.3 assist. He improved vastly during his junior year and led his team in scoring with 16 points per game while shooting 45 percent. Agassi again improved during his senior year as he led Walnut High to the semi-final of the Glendora Basketball Tournament. He was eventually named the tournament MVP as his team finished third after beating the host team, Glendora High School where Agassi scored 22 points. For the year, he averaged 18.8 points, 5.5 rebounds and 1.2 assists.

== National team ==
Agassi was called to represent Indonesia during 2018 Asian Games 3x3 Basketball where he and his team finished third on their pool which consisted of teams from China, Thailand, Indonesia, Sri Lanka and Vietnam. They were not qualified to proceed to the knockout stage. He was called to join the national team for the 2021 FIBA Eastern Region Pre-Qualifiers where he and his team successfully secured a spot at FIBA Asia Cup 2021 Qualifiers which is scheduled to be held in November 2019.

== IBL career statistics ==
Legend
GP	Games played	GS	Games started	MPG	Minutes per game
FG%	Field goal percentage	3P%	3-point field goal percentage	FT%	Free throw percentage
RPG	Rebounds per game	APG	Assists per game	SPG	Steals per game
BPG	Blocks per game	PPG	Points per game	**Bold**	Career high

†	Denotes seasons in which Goantara won an IBL championship
*	Led the league

=== Regular season ===
Year	Team	League	GP	MPG	FG%	3P%	FT%	RPG	APG	SPG	BPG	PPG
2018–19	Stapac Jakarta	IBL	**16**	18.4	34.0	31.0	68.0	2.6	1.2	0.7	0.1	6.7
2020–21	Pelita Jaya Jakarta	IBL	**16**	**25.1**	**44.1**	**31.2**	**79.3**	**5.2**	**2.6**	**1.0**	**0.1**	**13.5**

=== Playoffs ===
Year	Team	League	GP	MPG	FG%	3P%	FT%	RPG	APG	SPG	BPG	PPG
2019	Stapac Jakarta	IBL	4	19.3	25.7	21.4	57.1	2.0	1.5	0.2	0.0	6.2
2021	Pelita Jaya Jakarta	IBL	5	31.1	32.8	29.0	79.1	6.4	3.4	1.2	0.4	14.8
