= Joshua Ibarra =

American-born Mexican basketball player

No. 44 – Fuerza Regia de Monterrey
- Position: Center
- League: LNBP

Personal information
- Born: 26 January 1995 (age 31) Angleton, Texas, U.S.
- Listed height: 6 ft 11 in (2.11 m)
- Listed weight: 250 lb (113 kg)

Career information
- High school: Angleton (Angleton, Texas)
- College: Houston Christian (2014–2018)
- NBA draft: 2019: undrafted
- Playing career: 2019–present

Career history
- 2019–2020: Fuerza Regia de Monterrey
- 2021: Centauros de Chihuahua
- 2021: Panteras de Aguascalientes
- 2022: Apaches de Chihuahua
- 2022: Plateros de Fresnillo
- 2022–2023: Brampton Honey Badgers
- 2023: Plateros de Fresnillo
- 2024: Changwon LG Sakers
- 2024: Marinos de Oriente
- 2024: Diablos Rojos del México
- 2025: Piratas de Quebradillas
- 2025–2026: Dewa United Banten
- 2026–present: Fuerza Regia de Monterrey

Career highlights
- IBL champion (2025); IBL Finals MVP (2025)

Joshua Bryan Ibarra Edge (born 26 January 1995) is an American-born Mexican professional basketball player for Fuerza Regia de Monterrey of the Liga Nacional de Baloncesto Profesional (LNBP), and the Mexican national team.

== Early life and college career ==
Ibarra played college basketball for Houston Christian University. He played 89 games averaging 10.2 points and 7.1 rebounds per game.

== Career ==
Ibarra made his debut in the 2019 season with the Fuerza Regia de Monterrey to play in the LNBP. In 2021 season he joined Panteras de Aguascalientes. In 2022 season he signed with Plateros de Fresnillo. In 2022–23 BCL Americas, he joined Brampton Honey Badgers. In January 2024, he joined Changwon LG Sakers of the Korean Basketball League, replacing Assem Marei until February 18. In 2024 season he arrived to Marinos de Oriente. The same season he signed with Diablos Rojos del México were the team won the season championship.

== National team career ==
In August and September of 2023, he was a member of the Mexican national team that participated in the 2023 FIBA World Cup held in Asia, finishing in 25th place.
