= Hangtuah JG Liem =

- 2026 IBL Indonesia
- Leagues: Indonesian Basketball League (2003–present)
- Founded: 1995
- History: Hangtuah (2003–2008); Hangtuah Sumsel Indonesia Muda (2008–2019); Amartha Hangtuah (2019–2024); Hangtuah Jakarta (2025–2026); Hangtuah JG Liem (2026–present)
- Arena: GOR Universitas Negeri Jakarta; GOR Ciracas
- Location: Jakarta, Indonesia
- Team colours: Navy, White, Light Blue, Red
- President: Harryadin Mahardika
- Head coach: Wahyu Widayat Jati
- Website: https://hangtuah.id/
Home	Away

Hangtuah JG Liem is a professional basketball club based in Jakarta, Indonesia that plays in the Indonesian Basketball League.

== League ==
Seasons	W	L	Play-off	W	L
2016	15	18	First Round	0	1
2017	6	9	Didn't Qualify		
2018	7	10	Semi-Finals	3	3
2019	6	12	Didn't Qualify		
2020	4	10	Didn't Qualify		
2021	2	14	Didn't Qualify		
2022	12	10	First Round	0	2
2023	12	18	Didn't Qualify		

== Roster ==
Hangtuah Jakarta roster
Players
Coaches

Pos.	No.	Nat.	Name	Ht.	Wt.
PG	0	(Indonesia)	Mohammed Aofar Hedyan	1.80 m (5 ft 11 in)	72 kg (159 lb)
SG	1	(Indonesia)	Diftha Pratama	1.83 m (6 ft 0 in)	82 kg (181 lb)
G	2	(Indonesia)	Jovan Gulung	1.75 m (5 ft 9 in)	80 kg (176 lb)
F	4	(United States)	Nick Hornsby (I)	1.97 m (6 ft 6 in)	107 kg (236 lb)
SG	5	(Indonesia)	Sahid Kasim	1.80 m (5 ft 11 in)	80 kg (176 lb)
PG	7	(Indonesia)	Januar Kuntara	1.71 m (5 ft 7 in)	65 kg (143 lb)
SG	8	(Indonesia)	Arlan Alexander Sitorus	1.75 m (5 ft 9 in)	85 kg (187 lb)
F/C	9	(Indonesia)	Padre Taranngiar Hosbach	1.93 m (6 ft 4 in)	85 kg (187 lb)
G	11	(Indonesia)	Althof Dwira Satrio	1.84 m (6 ft 0 in)	82 kg (181 lb)
F	12	(Indonesia)	Yogi Saputra Chan	1.88 m (6 ft 2 in)	80 kg (176 lb)
SF	19	(Indonesia)	Richard Kornelius (R)	1.84 m (6 ft 0 in)	93 kg (205 lb)
F	24	(Indonesia)	Paschal Christopher (R)	1.85 m (6 ft 1 in)	64 kg (141 lb)
C	25	(United States)	Rakeem Christmas (I)	2.03 m (6 ft 8 in)	113 kg (249 lb)
SF	26	(Indonesia)	James Muwardi	1.85 m (6 ft 1 in)	79 kg (174 lb)
PG	32	(United States)	Jarvis Summers (I)	1.89 m (6 ft 2 in)	93 kg (205 lb)
SF	33	(Indonesia)	Matthew Bryan Maranata	1.88 m (6 ft 2 in)	103 kg (227 lb)
F	77	(Indonesia)	Muhammad Rizal Falconi	1.97 m (6 ft 6 in)	78 kg (172 lb)

Head coach

- (Indonesia) Wahyu Widayat Jati

Assistant coach(es)

- (Indonesia) AF Rinaldo
- (Indonesia) Zulfahrizal

Legend

- (C) Team captain
- (I) Import player
- (R) Rookie
- Injured

- Roster
Updated: 16 March 2025,

=== Depth chart ===
Pos.	Starting 5	Bench
C	Rakeem Christmas	Padre Hosbach
PF	Nick Hornsby	Richard Kornelius
SF	Vander Blue	Althof Satrio
SG	Diftha Pratama	Sahid Kasim
PG	Aofar Hedyan	Januar Kuntara

== Awards ==
Rookie of the Year :

- Abraham Wenas (2018)
- Sahid Kasim (2025)

== Notable coaches and players ==
- Set a club record or won an individual award as a professional coach.
- Functioned as head coach for any senior national team at least once at an official international match.

- (Indonesia) Johannis Winar
- (Philippines) Nat Canson

=== Players ===
- Set a club record or won an individual award as a professional player.
- Played at least one official international match for his senior national team at any time.

- (Indonesia) Mei Joni
- (Indonesia) Abraham Wenas
- (South Sudan) (Australia) Emmanuel Malou
- (Indonesia) Max Yanto
- (Indonesia) Argus Sanyudy
- (United States) Nick Faust
- (United States) Anthony January
- (Indonesia) Daniel Wenas
- (Indonesia) Kelly Purwanto
- (Indonesia) Tri Hartanto
- (Indonesia) Govinda Julian Saputra
- (Indonesia) Hardianus Lakudu
- (United States) Devin Davis
- (Indonesia) Fisyaiful Amir
- (United States) Vander Blue
- (United States) Rakeem Christmas
- (United States) Shabazz Muhammad
- (United States) Nick Hornsby
