= Dewa United Banten BC =

Indonesian basketball team

Dewa United Banten
- 2026 IBL Indonesia
- Leagues: IBL
- Founded: 2020
- History: Dewa United Surabaya (2020-2023); Dewa United Banten (2023-)
- Arena: Dewa United Arena
- Location: Surabaya, East Java (2020-2023); Tangerang, Banten (since 2023)
- Team colors: Gold, White, Black
- President: Michael Oliver Wellerz
- General manager: Wijaya Saputra
- Head coach: David Reynard Singleton
- Affiliation: Dewa United F.C.
- Championships: IBL: 1 (2025)
- Website: dewaunited.com/basketball/home
Home	Away

Dewa United BC, commonly referred to as Dewa United Banten and colloquially as Dewa United, is an Indonesian professional basketball team currently playing in the Indonesian Basketball League, based in the city of Tangerang, Banten. It was formerly known as Dewa United Surabaya and were playing in Surabaya for the first two seasons of the club's existence before its move to Tangerang before the 2023 IBL season.

== Roster ==
Note: Flags indicate national team eligibility at FIBA-sanctioned events. Players may hold other non-FIBA nationalities not displayed.

Dewa United Banten roster
Players
Coaches

Pos.	No.	Nat.	Name	Ht.	Wt.
PG	2	(Indonesia)	Hardianus Lakudu	1.75 m (5 ft 9 in)	65 kg (143 lb)
SG	4	(Indonesia)	Erick Ibrahim Junior	1.93 m (6 ft 4 in)	78 kg (172 lb)
PF	6	(Indonesia)	Elang Dewanto	1.90 m (6 ft 3 in)	75 kg (165 lb)
F	10	(Indonesia)	I Nyoman Aldo Dharma (R)	1.85 m (6 ft 1 in)	85 kg (187 lb)
PG	11	(Indonesia)	Kennie Elbert	1.78 m (5 ft 10 in)	68 kg (150 lb)
F	13	(Indonesia)	Kaleb Gemilang (C)	1.84 m (6 ft 0 in)	93 kg (205 lb)
F	15	(Indonesia)	Coby Jennings (R)	1.89 m (6 ft 2 in)	76 kg (168 lb)
G	16	(Indonesia)	Sakha Dewanto (R)	1.90 m (6 ft 3 in)	82 kg (181 lb)
G	24	(Indonesia)	Bryan Korisano	1.83 m (6 ft 0 in)	80 kg (176 lb)
F	25	(Indonesia)	Dio Tirta Saputra	1.90 m (6 ft 3 in)	74 kg (163 lb)
C	34	(Indonesia)	Pandu Wiguna	1.94 m (6 ft 4 in)	78 kg (172 lb)
C	35	(Indonesia)	Arthur Vadel	1.99 m (6 ft 6 in)	80 kg (176 lb)
PG	55	(Indonesia)	Radithyo Wibowo	1.77 m (5 ft 10 in)	69 kg (152 lb)

Head coach

- (Indonesia) Yurifan Hosen

Assistant coach(es)

- (Lithuania) Gustas Maskoliunas
- (Indonesia) Muhammad Fajeriannor
- (Indonesia) Andri Malay

Legend

- (C) Team captain
- (I) Import player
- (R) Rookie
- Injured

=== Depth chart ===
Pos.	Starting 5	Bench
C	Joshua Ibarra	Erick Ibrahim Junior
PF	Troy Gillenwater	Patrick Nikolas
SF	Dio Tirta Saputra	Arki Wisnu
SG	Radithyo Wibowo	Rio Disi
PG	D.J. Cooper	Hardianus Lakudu

=== Individual awards ===
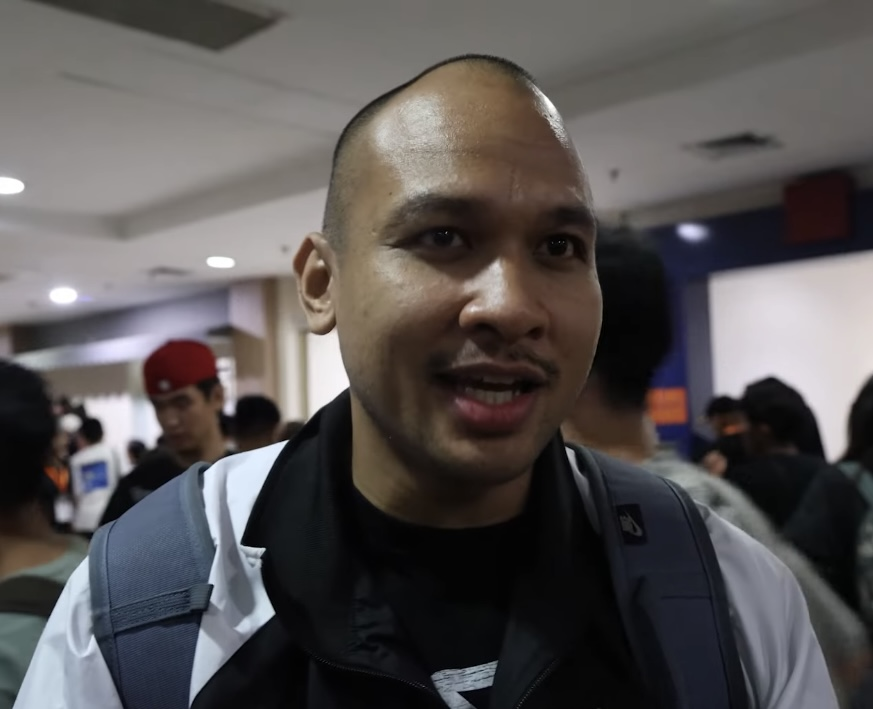
Kaleb Gemilang

- IBL Most Valuable Player
  - Kaleb Gemilang (2023)
  - Rio Disi (2026)
- IBL Rookie of the Year
  - Radithyo Wibowo (2024)
- All-IBL First Team
  - Kaleb Gemilang (2023)
- IBL Sixthman Of The Year
  - Rio Disi (2025, 2026)
- IBL Sportmanship Of The Year
  - Lester Prosper (2025)
  - Rio Disi (2026)
- IBL Finals MVP
  - Joshua Ibarra (2025)

== Notable players ==
To appear in this section a player must have either:

- Set a club record or won an individual award as a professional player.
- Played at least one official international match for his senior national team at any time. - Played at least one official regular season game in the NBA.

- (United States) Jordan Adams
- (The Bahamas) Tavario Miller
- (Dominican Republic) Gelvis Solano
- (Indonesia) Xaverius Prawiro
- (Indonesia) Lester Prosper
- (Indonesia) Firman Dwi Nugroho

== Players in national teams ==
Pos	Name	Height	Country	Schools/Province/Country
C	Joshua Ibarra	6-11	Mexico	Houston Christian University
G/F	Kaleb Gemilang	6-0	Indonesia	Harapan Bangsa Institute of Technology
G	Rio Disi	6-1	Indonesia	DKI Jakarta
PF	Patrick Nikolas	6-2	Indonesia	DKI Jakarta

== See also ==
- Dewa United FC, the club's football division
