= 2026 Indonesian Basketball League =

2026 IBL Gopay
- League: Indonesian Basketball League
- Sport: Basketball
- Duration: 10 January – 10 May 2026 (regular season)
- Teams: 11
- TV partner: TVRI (All-Indonesian Cup only)
- Streaming partner: IBL TV via YouTube

Regular season
- Top seed: Pelita Jaya Bakrie
- Season MVP: Rio Disi (Local MVP); Travin Thibodeaux (League-wide)
- Top scorer: AJ Bramah

Cup
- Cup champions: Satria Muda Bandung (3rd title)
- Cup runners-up: Dewa United Banten
- Cup MVP: Abraham Damar Grahita

Playoffs
- Champions: Bogor Hornbills (1st title)
- Runners-up: Pelita Jaya Jakarta
- Finals MVP: Travin Thibodeaux

Indonesian Basketball League seasons
- ← 2025 2027 →

The 2026 Indonesian Basketball League (known as IBL Gopay for sponsorship reasons) is the eleventh season of Indonesian top domestic basketball league, the Indonesian Basketball League, since the re-branding by Starting5 in 2015. It is the 23rd IBL season overall since its establishment in 2003.

The regular season began on January 10, 2026, and scheduled to end on 10 May 2026, with two breaks; mid-season break from 23 February to 3 March 2026 for early Ramadan and Eid al-Fitr and Lebaran break on 16–29 March 2026.

== Rule Changes ==
The league announced several rule changes for the 2026 season.

- The semifinals and finals have been extended to a best-of-five format, a first in the league's history. Previously, these rounds used a best-of-three system.
- In the best-of-five series, the team with the higher seed hosts games 1, 2, and a potential game 5. The lower-seeded team hosts games 3 and 4. Round 1 of the playoffs remains a best-of-three format.
- Teams are permitted to have a maximum of three foreign players on their roster, including naturalized or heritage players. All three foreign players are allowed to be on the court at the same time.
- Of the three foreign players, two must be 200 cm (approximately 6'7") or shorter, while one player has no height restriction.
- A maximum monthly salary cap of US$30,000 for foreign players has been introduced to ensure financial balance and competitive equity across teams.
- Clubs are required to register a minimum of two players under the age of 23 and ensure they receive an average playing time of at least five minutes per game throughout the season.

== Teams ==
Eleven teams compete in the 2026 Indonesian Basketball League (IBL), a reduction from the 14 teams that participated in the previous season.

Bali United Basketball and Bima Perkasa Jogja will not take part in the 2026 season due to internal reasons. Meanwhile, Prawira Harum Bandung has merged with Satria Muda Jakarta to form a new team, Satria Muda Pertamina Bandung.

=== Venues and locations ===
Team	Arena	Home city
Bogor Hornbills	GOR Laga Tangkas	Cibinong, Bogor
Dewa United Banten	Dewa United Arena	Tangerang
Hangtuah Jakarta	GOR Ciracas	Jakarta
Kesatria Bengawan Solo	Sritex Arena	Solo
Pacific Caesar Surabaya	GOR Pacific Caesar	Surabaya
Pelita Jaya Jakarta	PJ Arena	Jakarta
Rajawali Medan	GOR Universitas Medan	Medan
RANS Simba Bogor	Gymnasium Sekolah Vokasi IPB	Bogor
Satria Muda Pertamina Bandung	Bandung Arena	Bandung
Satya Wacana Saints Salatiga	GOR Basket Susilo Wibowo	Semarang
Tangerang Hawks	Indoor Kelapa Dua Sport Centre	Tangerang

=== Personnel ===
Team	Manager	Head coach	Captain
Bogor Hornbills	(Indonesia) Ridwan Eka Saputra	(Spain) Cesar Camara Perez	(United States) Kaleb Wesson
Dewa United Banten	(Indonesia) Zaki Iskandar	(Spain) Augustí Julbe	(Indonesia) Arki Dikania Wisnu
Hangtuah Jakarta	(Indonesia) Leonardo Niki	(Indonesia) Wahyu Widayat Jati	(Indonesia) Diftha Pratama
Kesatria Bengawan Solo	(Indonesia) Taufik Ramadan	(England) Tony Garbelotto	(United States) Kentrell Barkley
Pacific Caesar Surabaya	(Indonesia) Dean Julyanto	(Indonesia) Andika Supriadi Saputra	(Indonesia) Daffa Dhoifullah
Pelita Jaya Jakarta	(Indonesia) Adhi Pratama	(United States) David Singleton	(Indonesia) Andakara Prastawa
Rajawali Medan	(Indonesia) Guntur Santoso	(Indonesia) Efri Meldi	(Dominican Republic) Brandone Francis
RANS Simba Bogor	(Indonesia) Andrey Rido Mahardika	(Indonesia) Antonius Joko Endratmo	(Indonesia) Surliyadin Surliyadin
Satria Muda Bandung	(Indonesia) Cecilia Dwi Maya	(Serbia) Djordje Jovicic	(Indonesia) Abraham Damar Grahita
Satya Wacana Salatiga	(Indonesia) Dodik Tri Purnomo	(Indonesia) Jerry Lolowang	(Indonesia) Henry Cornelis Lakay
Tangerang Hawks	(Indonesia) Tikky Suwantikno	(Indonesia) Tondi Raja Syailendra	(Indonesia) Yesaya Saudale

=== Foreign Players ===
The 2026 IBL introduced a new rule allowing a maximum of three foreign players, including those of heritage/naturalized players. This differs from the previous season, where heritage players could be registered in addition to the three foreign players.

Teams	Player 1	Player 2	Player 3	Former players
Bogor Hornbills	(United States) Travin Thibodeaux	(United States) Kaleb Wesson	(United States) Steph Branch	
Dewa United Banten	(Mexico) (United States) Joshua Ibarra	(United States) Donell Cooper Jr.	(United States) Troy Gillenwater	(United States) Jordan Adams
Hangtuah Jakarta	(United States) Rakeem Christmas	(United States) Nick Hornsby	(United States) Jarvis Summers	(United States) Vander Blue
Kesatria Bengawan Solo	(United States) Kentrell Barkley	(United States) Rayvonte Rice	(United States) C.J. Gettys	(United States) Rashad Vaughn (United States) (Ivory Coast) Deon Thompson
Pacific Caesar Surabaya	(United States) (Dominican Republic) Adonnecy Bramah	(United States) Xavier Cannefax	(Nigeria) (Malaysia) Joseph Obasa	(Croatia) Dino Butorac (United States) Anthony Peacock (Puerto Rico) (Dominican Republic) Miguel Miranda (United States) Gregoryshon Magee
Pelita Jaya Jakarta	(United States) Darious Moten	(United States) Jeff Withey	(Jordan) (United States) Perrin Buford	(United States) Amorie Archibald
Rajawali Medan	(United States) Antonio Hester	(South Sudan) Majur Majak	(United States) McKenzie Moore	(Lebanon) Ater Majok (Dominican Republic) Brandone Francis
RANS Simba Bogor	(United States) KJ Buffen	(United States) (Mexico) Aaron Fuller	(Serbia) Radoslav Peković	(Trinidad and Tobago) Jabari Narcis
Satria Muda Bandung	(United States) Jalen Jones	(Georgia (country)) (Austria) Giorgi Bezhanishvili	(United States) Niven Glover	(United States) Jordan Ivy-Curry (United States) Chad Brown
Satya Wacana Salatiga	(Ukraine) Serhii Pavlov	(Canada) Kevin Kangu	(United States) Leon Gilmore	
Tangerang Hawks	(Haiti) Jeantal Cylla	(United States) Darnell Cowart	(United States) Will Brown	(Brazil) João Vitor (United States) Joshua Cunnigham

=== Rookie players ===
Teams	Rookie 1	Rookie 2
Hangtuah Jakarta	(Indonesia) Paschal Christopher	(Indonesia) Richard Kornelius
Satya Wacana Saints	(Indonesia) Henry Sualang	(Indonesia) Mochammad Nabizar Taqwa
Bogor Hornbills	(Indonesia) Almando Davin Nepa Bait	(Indonesia) Oktora Raihan Andhiky
Dewa United Banten BC	(Indonesia) Elang Dewanto	(Indonesia) Kennie Elbert
Kesatria Bengawan Solo	(Indonesia) Yordan Ezra	
Pacific Caesar	(Indonesia) Danu Satria Fajar Aprilianto	
Pelita Jaya	(Indonesia) Russel Nyoo	(Indonesia) Candra Irawan
Rajawali Medan	(Indonesia) (Cameroon) Deo Putra Conrad	(Indonesia) Edo Iman Tauhid
RANS Simba Bogor		
Satria Muda Bandung	(Indonesia) Raden Raisha	(Indonesia) Hosea Kenneth
Tangerang Hawks	(Indonesia) (United States) Syadzili Aufa	(Indonesia) I Nyoman Bagus Daneswara

== Regular season ==
=== League table ===
Pos	Team	Pld	W	L	PF	PA	PD	Pts	Qualification
1	Pelita Jaya Jakarta	20	18	2	1659	1332	+327	38	Advance to Playoffs
2	Satria Muda Bandung	20	15	5	1678	1460	+218	35	Advance to Playoffs
3	Bogor Hornbills	20	14	6	1736	1563	+173	34	Advance to Playoffs
4	Dewa United Banten	20	14	6	1743	1652	+91	34	Advance to Playoffs
5	Tangerang Hawks	20	10	10	1663	1692	−29	30	Advance to Playoffs
6	Kesatria Bengawan Solo	20	10	10	1664	1700	−36	30	Advance to Playoffs
7	Hangtuah Jakarta	20	10	10	1536	1492	+44	30	Advance to Playoffs
8	RANS Simba Bogor	20	7	13	1644	1622	+22	27	Advance to Playoffs
9	Rajawali Medan	20	6	14	1522	1666	−144	26	
10	Pacific Caesar	20	4	16	1569	1849	−280	24	
11	Satya Wacana	20	2	18	1330	1716	−386	22	

Source: IBL Indonesia

=== Results ===
Home \ Away	BHB	DBC	HTJ	KBS	PCC	PJB	RWM	RNS	SMB	SWS	TGH
Bogor Hornbills	—	109–76	77–73	82–66	99–81	88–92	104–71	80–68	91–93	75–77	69–67
Dewa United Banten	97–91	—	83–75	101–91	92–82	82–98	82–86	92–90	88–92	84–74	101–60
Hangtuah Jakarta	83–84(OT)	69–73	—	61–56	98–78	63–73	78–65	72–53	70–62	75–68	72–79
Kesatria Bengawan Solo	81–91	95–84	93–90(OT)	—	98–91	84–71	78–81	63–101	69–84	99–62	70–83
Pacific Caesar	83–90	97–87	84–108	68–93	—	53–96	75–93	77–92	75–93	98–74	84–87
Pelita Jaya Jakarta	81–75	70–81	98–81	82–47	95–64	—	91–60	87–58	67–63	85–45	90–78
Rajawali Medan	64–86	75–78	72–75	97–110(OT)	67–71	66–86	—	86–82	73–82	82–59	82–99
RANS Simba Bogor	72–86	75–96	58–71	101–105(OT)	101–83	72–73	99–70	—	64–79	93–67	79–85
Satria Muda Bandung	76–69	79–94	77–57	96–64	106–56	59–65	89–87	84–95(OT)	—	97–59	92–82
Satya Wacana	75–99	75–86	70–79	76–102	84–67	46–68	60–76	63–93	61–80	—	76–93
Tangerang Hawks	87–91	69–86	89–86	98–100	96–102	67–91	82–69	103–98	74–95	85–59	—

Updated to match(es) played on 10 May 2026. Source: IBL Indonesia
Legend: Blue = home team win; Red = away team win.

== Playoffs ==
=== Bracket ===
First round Best-of-3
1	Pelita Jaya Jakarta	2
8	RANS Simba Bogor	0
4	Dewa United Banten	2
5	Tangerang Hawks	0
2	Satria Muda Bandung	2
7	Hangtuah Jakarta	0
3	Bogor Hornbills	2
6	Kesatria Bengawan Solo	1

Semifinals; Best-of-5
1	Pelita Jaya Jakarta	3
4	Dewa United Banten	1
2	Satria Muda Bandung	1
3	Bogor Hornbills	3

Finals; Best-of-5
1	Pelita Jaya Jakarta	2
3	Bogor Hornbills	3

=== First Round ===
==== Game 1 ====
YouTube

May 24
7:00 pm

Report
Boxscore

RANS Simba Bogor 82, Pelita Jaya Jakarta 84
Scoring by quarter: 26–28, 21–21, 20–16, 15–19
Pts: Buffen 19; Rebs: Fuller 15; Asts: Buffen 5	Pts: Withey 21; Rebs: three players 6 Asts: Buford 12
Pelita Jaya leads series, 1–0

Gymnasium Sekolah Vokasi IPB, Bogor, West Java
Referees: J. An, A. Canete, R. Dwiantino

==== Game 2 ====
YouTube

May 28
6:30 pm

Report
Boxscore

Pelita Jaya Jakarta 98, RANS Simba Bogor 57
Scoring by quarter: 27–18, 22–13, 24–14, 25–12
Pts: Buford 21; Rebs: Withey 17; Asts: Buford 13	Pts: Buffen, Fuller 17; Rebs: Buffen, Peković 8 Asts: Peković 5
Pelita Jaya wins series, 2–0

GOR Soemantri Brodjonegoro, Jakarta
Referees: L. Wing, A. Canete, R. Rifky

==== Game 1 ====
YouTube

May 23
5:00 pm

Report
Boxscore

Hangtuah Jakarta 80, Satria Muda Bandung 96
Scoring by quarter: 19–24, 21–31, 25–18, 15–23
Pts: Summers 21; Rebs: Hornsby 12; Asts: Hornsby 8	Pts: Glover 28; Rebs: Bezhanishvili 12; Asts: Saputera 11
Satria Muda leads series, 1–0

GOR Ciracas, Jakarta
Referees: J. An, A. Canete, H. Sutaryo

==== Game 2 ====
YouTube

May 27
6:30 pm

Report
Boxscore

Satria Muda Bandung 105, Hangtuah Jakarta 100
Scoring by quarter: 25–30, 35–25, 16–22, 29–23
Pts: Glover 28; Rebs: Bezhanishvili 13; Asts: Glover 8	Pts: Summers 36; Rebs: Hornsby 16; Asts: Hornsby 5
Satria Muda wins series, 2–0

GOR C-Tra Arena, Bandung, West Java
Referees: L. Wing, O. Leong, Y. Kuncara

==== Game 1 ====
YouTube

May 23
7:00 pm

Report
Boxscore

Kesatria Bengawan Solo 82, Bogor Hornbills 81
Scoring by quarter: 28–20, 18–13, 15–28, 21–20
Pts: Barkley 33; Rebs: Gettys 13; Asts: Wenas 5	Pts: Branch, Wesson 19; Rebs: Branch 13; Asts: Thibodeaux 7
Kesatria leads series, 1–0

Sritex Arena, Surakarta, Central Java
Referees: L. Wing, O. Leong, A. Saputro

==== Game 2 ====
YouTube

May 27
7:00 pm

Report
Boxscore

Bogor Hornbills 111, Kesatria Bengawan Solo 103 (OT)
Scoring by quarter: 19–30, 27–24, 25–21, 20–16, Overtime: 20–12
Pts: Thibodeaux 29; Rebs: Thibodeaux, Wesson 14; Asts: Thibodeaux 13	Pts: Rice 44; Rebs: Gettys 18; Asts: Seputra 5
Series tied, 1–1

GOR Laga Tangkas, Cibinong, Bogor, West Java
Referees: J. An, B. Marfan, A. Canete

==== Game 3 ====
YouTube

May 30
6:00 pm

Report
Boxscore

Bogor Hornbills 93, Kesatria Bengawan Solo 91 (OT)
Scoring by quarter: 28–20, 22–20, 18–25, 14–17, Overtime: 11–9
Pts: Thibodeaux 38; Rebs: Thibodeaux 17; Asts: Branch 10	Pts: Barkley 25; Rebs: Barkley 14; Asts: Rice 6
Hornbills wins series, 2–1

GOR Laga Tangkas, Cibinong, Bogor, West Java
Referees: J. An, L. Wing, R. Dwiantino

==== Game 1 ====
YouTube

May 28
7:00 pm

Report
Boxscore

Tangerang Hawks 66, Dewa United Banten 85
Scoring by quarter: 15–23, 22–24, 13–24, 16–14
Pts: Cylla, Cowart 12; Rebs: Cowart 13; Asts: Saudale, Swenjaya 4	Pts: Gillenwater 26; Rebs: Ibarra 13; Asts: Cooper 13
Dewa United leads series, 1–0

Indoor Stadium Sports Center, Tangerang, Banten
Referees: J. An, O. Leong, R. Ichsan

==== Game 2 ====
YouTube

May 30
7:00 pm

Report
Boxscore

Dewa United Banten 102, Tangerang Hawks 70
Scoring by quarter: 33–23, 20–13, 21–16, 28–18
Pts: Junior 18; Rebs: Gillenwater 12; Asts: Cooper 8	Pts: Brown 31; Rebs: Brown 7 Asts: Cylla 7
Dewa United wins series, 2–0

Dewa United Arena, Tangerang, Banten
Referees: A. Canete, O. Leong, D. Triyanto

=== Semi Finals ===
==== Game 1 ====
YouTube

June 6
7:00 pm

Report
Boxscore

Pelita Jaya Jakarta 76, Dewa United Banten 78
Scoring by quarter: 14–33, 23–22, 21–12, 18–11
Pts: Buford 23; Rebs: Withey 13; Asts: Buford 7	Pts: Gillenwater 35; Rebs: Ibarra 14; Asts: Cooper 12
Dewa United leads series, 1–0

GOR Soemantri Brodjonegoro, Jakarta
Referees: P. Kyoungjin, Z. Xiao, A. Mubalek

==== Game 2 ====
YouTube

June 8
7:00 pm

Report
Boxscore

Pelita Jaya Jakarta 93, Dewa United Banten 79
Scoring by quarter: 26–18, 15–26, 30–14, 22–21
Pts: Buford 28; Rebs: Buford 12; Asts: Buford 12	Pts: Gillenwater 23; Rebs: Ibarra 13; Asts: Cooper 9
Series tied, 1–1

GOR Soemantri Brodjonegoro, Jakarta
Referees: P. Kyoungjin, Y. Yip, P. Polnaja

==== Game 3 ====
YouTube

June 11
7:00 pm

Report
Boxscore

Dewa United Banten 83, Pelita Jaya Jakarta 84
Scoring by quarter: 22–18, 27–30, 14–15, 20–21
Pts: Gillenwater 27; Rebs: Ibarra 18; Asts: Cooper 11	Pts: three players 19; Rebs: Withey 8 Asts: Buford 8
Pelita Jaya leads series, 2–1

Dewa United Arena, Tangerang, Banten
Referees: Z. Xiao, Y. Yip, A. Saputro

==== Game 4 ====
YouTube

June 13
7:00 pm

Report
Boxscore

Dewa United Banten 78, Pelita Jaya Jakarta 94
Scoring by quarter: 24–21, 10–20, 22–32, 22–21
Pts: Gillenwater 33; Rebs: Ibarra 14; Asts: Cooper 6	Pts: Withey 25; Rebs: Withey 17; Asts: Buford 15
Pelita Jaya wins series, 3–1

Dewa United Arena, Tangerang, Banten
Referees: P. Kyoungjin, Z. Xiao, B. Marfan

==== Game 1 ====
YouTube

June 5
7:00 pm

Report
Boxscore

Satria Muda Bandung 93, Bogor Hornbills 99
Scoring by quarter: 21–26, 26–17, 13–19, 33–37
Pts: Glover 29; Rebs: Glover 13; Asts: Glover 5	Pts: Branch 32; Rebs: Wesson 12; Asts: Thibodeaux 8
Hornbills leads series, 1–0

GOR C-Tra Arena, Bandung, West Java
Referees: P. Kyoungjin, Y. Yip, F. Ashari

==== Game 2 ====
YouTube

June 7
7:00 pm

Report
Boxscore

Satria Muda Bandung 89, Bogor Hornbills 81
Scoring by quarter: 25–18, 24–24, 19–23, 21–16
Pts: Glover, Bezhanishvili 24; Rebs: Bezhanishvili 13; Asts: Saputera 10	Pts: Thibodeaux 24; Rebs: Wesson 11; Asts: Branch 12
Series tied, 1–1

GOR C-Tra Arena, Bandung, West Java
Referees: Z. Xiao, Y. Yip, R. Lesmana

==== Game 3 ====
YouTube

June 10
7:00 pm

Report
Boxscore

Bogor Hornbills 93, Satria Muda Bandung 82
Scoring by quarter: 24–23, 26–24, 14–22, 29–13
Pts: Wesson 32; Rebs: Wesson 11; Asts: Branch 10	Pts: Glover 19; Rebs: Bezhanishvili 8 Asts: Bezhanishvili 6
Hornbils leads series, 2–1

GOR Laga Tangkas, Cibinong, Bogor, West Java
Referees: P. Kyoungjin, Z. Xiao, R. Ichsan

==== Game 4 ====
YouTube

June 12
7:00 pm

Report
Boxscore

Bogor Hornbills 82, Satria Muda Bandung 79
Scoring by quarter: 21–20, 16–13, 23–27, 22–19
Pts: Wesson 20; Rebs: Branch, Wesson 11; Asts: Branch, Thibodeaux 8	Pts: Grahita 22; Rebs: three players 8 Asts: Saputera 6
Hornbills wins series, 3–1

GOR Laga Tangkas, Cibinong, Bogor, West Java
Referees: P. Kyoungjin, Y. Yip, H. Sutaryo

=== Finals: (1) Pelita Jaya Jakarta vs. (3) Bogor Hornbills ===
==== Game 1 ====
YouTube

June 19
7:00 pm

Report
Boxscore

Pelita Jaya Jakarta 90, Bogor Hornbills 87 (OT)
Scoring by quarter: 19–19, 16–16, 20–23, 21–18, Overtime: 14–11
Pts: Buford 32; Rebs: Buford 11; Asts: Buford 9	Pts: Branch, Thibodeaux 22; Rebs: Thibodeaux 10; Asts: Branch 9
Pelita Jaya leads series, 1–0

GOR Soemantri Brodjonegoro, Jakarta
Referees: P. Kyoungjin, D. Urushima, H. Sutaryo

==== Game 2 ====
YouTube

June 21
7:00 pm

Report
Boxscore

Pelita Jaya Jakarta 63, Bogor Hornbills 83
Scoring by quarter: 15–18, 14–27, 18–17, 16–21
Pts: Goantara 15; Rebs: Buford 8 Asts: Buford 6	Pts: Thibodeaux 36; Rebs: Wesson 13; Asts: Branch 7
Series tied, 1–1

GOR Soemantri Brodjonegoro, Jakarta
Referees: P. Kyoungjin, A. Alhejaili, A. Saputro

==== Game 3 ====
YouTube

June 24
7:00 pm

Report
Boxscore

Bogor Hornbills 61, Pelita Jaya Jakarta 74
Scoring by quarter: 12–17, 16–23, 16–18, 17–16
Pts: Branch 23; Rebs: Wesson 13; Asts: Thibodeaux 6	Pts: Moten 22; Rebs: Buford, Withey 11; Asts: Buford 10
Pelita Jaya leads series, 2–1

GOR Laga Tangkas, Cibinong, Bogor, West Java
Referees: D. Urushima, A. Alhejaili, B. Marfan

==== Game 4 ====
YouTube

June 26
7:00 pm

Report
Boxscore

Bogor Hornbills 85, Pelita Jaya Jakarta 72
Scoring by quarter: 19–19, 28–19, 17–12, 21–22
Pts: Branch 37; Rebs: Wesson 10; Asts: Thibodeaux 7	Pts: Buford 17; Rebs: Buford 10; Asts: Buford 4
Series tied, 2–2

GOR Laga Tangkas, Cibinong, Bogor, West Java
Referees: D. Urushima, A. Alhejaili, R. Dwiantino

==== Game 5 ====
YouTube

June 28
7:00 pm

Report
Boxscore

Pelita Jaya Jakarta 61, Bogor Hornbills 64
Scoring by quarter: 11–24, 20–21, 15–8, 15–11
Pts: Withey 19; Rebs: Withey 12; Asts: Buford 9	Pts: Thibodeaux 22; Rebs: Wesson 13; Asts: Thibodeaux 9
Hornbills wins series, 3–2

GOR Soemantri Brodjonegoro, Jakarta
Referees: D. Urushima, A. Alhejali, H. Sutaryo

== All-Star Games ==
=== Pre-game ===
1 on 1 challenge champion: (Indonesia) Justin Jaya Wiyanto (Tangerang Hawks)

Participants
Pos.	Player	Team	Ht.
G	Yesaya Saudale	Tangerang Hawks	5'10
G	Raden Raisha	Satria Muda Bandung	6'0
G	Daffa Dhoifullah	Pacific Caesar	6'1
G	Justin Jaya Wiyanto	Tangerang Hawks	6'1

Three-point contest champion : (Indonesia) Agassi Goantara (Pelita Jaya)

Participants
Pos.	Player	Team	Ht.
G	Jordan Ivy-Curry	Satria Muda Bandung	6'1
G	Agassi Goantara	Pelita Jaya	6'2
G	Daniel Salamena	RANS Simba Bogor	6'2
G	Sandy Ibrahim	Satria Muda Bandung	6'2
F	Jeantal Cylla	Tangerang Hawks	6'7

=== Half game ===
Future Stars challenge champion :Team Daffa

=== Game ===
==== Team Yudha ====
Pos	Name	Club
Starters
G	(Indonesia) Abraham Damar Grahita	Satria Muda Bandung
PF	(Indonesia) Julian Chalias	Satria Muda Bandung
PF	(Dominican Republic) AJ Bramah	Pacific Caesar Surabaya
SF	(Dominican Republic) Brandone Francis	Rajawali Medan
PG	(Indonesia) Yudha Saputera	Satria Muda Bandung
Reserves
SG	(Indonesia) Erick Ibrahim Junior	Dewa United Banten
G	(Indonesia) Muhamad Arighi	Pelita Jaya
F	(Indonesia) Dame Diagne	Satria Muda Bandung
G	(Indonesia) Yesaya Saudale	Tangerang Hawks
F	(Indonesia) Dio Tirta Saputra	Dewa United Banten
SF	(Indonesia) Fhirdan Guntara	Bogor Hornbills
PG	(United States) Jordan Ivy-Curry	Satria Muda Bandung
Coach
	(Spain) Cesar Camara Perez	Bogor Hornbills

==== Team Prastawa ====
Pos	Name	Club
Starters
PG	(Indonesia) Andakara Prastawa	Pelita Jaya
C	(United States) Jeff Withey	Pelita Jaya
G	(Indonesia) Agassi Goantara	Pelita Jaya
G/F	(Indonesia) Hendrick Xavi Yonga	Pelita Jaya
G	(United States) Amorie Archibald	Pelita Jaya
Reserves
G/F	(Indonesia) Rio Disi	Dewa United Banten
G	(United States) Steph Branch	Bogor Hornbills
F/C	(Indonesia) Pandu Wiguna	Satria Muda Bandung
SF	(Indonesia) Arki Wisnu	Dewa United Banten
G	(Indonesia) Antoni Erga	Bogor Hornbills
SF	(Indonesia) David Nuban	Bogor Hornbills
PF	(Indonesia) Patrick Nikolas	Dewa United Banten
C	(Indonesia) Vincent Kosasih (injured)	Pelita Jaya
Coach
	(United States) David Singleton	Pelita Jaya

YouTube

April 11
7:00 pm

Team Yudha 117, Team Prastawa 106
Scoring by quarter: 31–26, 27–37, 26–25, 33–18
Pts: Bramah 35; Rebs: Bramah 20; Asts: Saputera, Ivy-Curry 6	Pts: Branch 27; Rebs: Withey 16; Asts: Branch 8

GOR C-Tra Arena, Bandung

==== Most Valuable Player ====
Country	Name	Team
(Dominican Republic)	AJ Bramah	Pacific Caesar

==== Local Most Valuable Player ====
Country	Name	Team
(Indonesia)	Yudha Saputera	Satria Muda Bandung

==== Most Favorite Player ====
Country	Name	Team
(Indonesia)	Yudha Saputera	Satria Muda Bandung

== Awards ==
2026 IBL awards
Award	Recipient(s)	Finalists
IBL Most Valuable Player Award	(United States) Travin Thibodeaux (Bogor Hornbills)	D. J. Cooper (Dewa United Basketball); Kentrell Barkley (Kesatria Bengawan Solo); KJ Buffen (RANS Simba Bogor); Nick Hornsby (Hangtuah Jakarta)
Local Player of the Year	(Indonesia) Rio Disi (Dewa United Basketball)	Yudha Saputera (Satria Muda Bandung); Yesaya Saudale (Tangerang Hawks); Andakara Prastawa (Pelita Jaya); Antoni Erga (Bogor Hornbills)
Rookie of the Year	(Indonesia) Henry Sualang (Satya Wacana Saints)	Richard Kornelius (Hangtuah Jakarta); Raden Raisha (Satria Muda Bandung); Danu Fajar Aprilianto (Pacific Caesar); Almando Davin (Bogor Hornbills)
Coach of the Year	(Spain) Cesar Camara Perez (Bogor Hornbills)	David Singleton (Pelita Jaya); Augustí Julbe (Dewa United Basketball); Djordje Jovicic (Satria Muda Bandung); Wahyu Widayat Jati (Hangtuah Jakarta)
Defensive Player of the Year	(Indonesia) Yudha Saputera (Satria Muda Bandung)	Hendrick Xavi Yonga (Pelita Jaya); Dame Diagne (Satria Muda Bandung); Fhirdan Guntara (Bogor Hornbills); Andakara Prastawa (Pelita Jaya)
Sixthman of the Year	(Indonesia) Rio Disi (Dewa United Basketball)	Andakara Prastawa (Pelita Jaya); Fhirdan Guntara (Bogor Hornbills); Sandy Ibrahim (Satria Muda Bandung); Sulthan Fauzan (Tangerang Hawks)
Most Improved Player of the Year	(Indonesia) Yesaya Saudale (Tangerang Hawks)	Antoni Erga (Bogor Hornbills); Sulthan Fauzan (Tangerang Hawks); Patrick Nikolas (Dewa United Basketball); Samuel Devin Susanto (Rajawali Medan)
Sportmanship Award	(Indonesia) Rio Disi (Dewa United Basketball)	Aaron Fuller (RANS Simba Bogor); Yudha Saputera (Satria Muda Bandung); Ponsianus Nyoman Indrawan (Kesatria Bengawan Solo); Sulthan Fauzan (Tangerang Hawks); AJ Bramah (Pacific Caesar); Samuel Devin Susanto (Rajawali Medan); Nick Hornsby (Hangtuah Jakarta); Fhirdan Guntara (Bogor Hornbills); Henry Cornelis Lakay (Satya Wacana Saints); Vincent Rivaldi Kosasih (Pelita Jaya)
Referee of the Year	(Indonesia) Budi Marfan	Arnaz Anggoro; Rendi Dwiantino; Yosep Norida; Rendra Lesmana

=== All-Team's Awards ===
- All-Local IBL First Team:
  - Antoni Erga, Bogor Hornbills
  - Yudha Saputera, Satria Muda Bandung
  - Rio Disi, Dewa United Banten
  - Yesaya Saudale, Tangerang Hawks
  - Andakara Prastawa, Pelita Jaya
- All-Local IBL Second Team:
  - Abraham Wenas, Kesatria Bengawan Solo
  - Agassi Goantara, Pelita Jaya
  - Abraham Damar Grahita, Satria Muda Bandung
  - Daffa Dhoifullah, Pacific Caesar
  - Dio Tirta Saputra, Dewa United Banten

- All-IBL Gopay First Team:
  - D. J. Cooper, Dewa United Banten
  - Kentrell Barkley, Kesatria Bengawan Solo
  - KJ Buffen, RANS Simba Bogor
  - Travin Thibodeaux, Bogor Hornbills
  - AJ Bramah, Pacific Caesar
- All-IBL Gopay Second Team:
  - Jeantal Cylla, Tangerang Hawks
  - Aaron Fuller, RANS Simba Bogor
  - Nick Hornsby, Hangtuah Jakarta
  - Antonio Hester, Rajawali Medan
  - Jeff Withey, Pelita Jaya

== All Indonesian Cup ==
All games are held in GOR Laga Tangkas, Bogor from 24 October to 1 November 2026. Only local players participate during this competition

=== Group A ===
Pos	Team	Pld	W	L	PF	PA	PD	Pts	Qualification
1	Satria Muda Bandung	4	4	0	316	282	+34	8	Advance to semi-finals
2	Bogor Hornbills (H)	4	3	1	287	244	+43	7	Advance to semi-finals
3	RANS Simba Bogor	4	2	2	291	282	+9	6	
4	Rajawali Medan	4	1	3	251	285	−34	5	
5	Pacific Caesar	4	0	4	251	303	−52	4	

Updated to match(es) played on unknown. Source: IBL Indonesia
(H) Hosts

24 October	Pacific Caesar	65–73	RANS Simba Bogor	Cibinong, Bogor
13:45	Scoring by quarter: 18–14, 16–22, 15–24, 16–13
	Pts: Pradhitya 18; Rebs: three players 5 Asts: Pradhitya 6	Boxscore	Pts: Mononimbar 21; Rebs: Gunawan 9 Asts: Lobbu, Hedyan 4	Arena: GOR Laga Tangkas; Referees: R. Lesmana, M. Nugraha, R. Bakkar

24 October	Bogor Hornbills	64–74	Satria Muda Bandung	Cibinong, Bogor
18:45	Scoring by quarter: 14–23, 25–12, 13–21, 12–18
	Pts: Nikolas 18; Rebs: Nikolas 11; Asts: Guntara 3	Boxscore	Pts: Diagne 19; Rebs: Gloria 7 Asts: Saputera 9	Arena: GOR Laga Tangkas; Referees: B. Marfan, R. Rifky, D. Setia

25 October	Bogor Hornbills	73–47	Rajawali Medan	Cibinong, Bogor
18:30	Scoring by quarter: 18–14, 18–13, 18–12, 19–8
	Pts: Nuban 14; Rebs: Rachman, Guntara 7 Asts: Teja 7	Boxscore	Pts: Syahputra 15; Rebs: Susanto 5 Asts: Wimbardi 4	Arena: GOR Laga Tangkas; Referees: R. Lesmana, F. Ashari, V. Septiansyah

26 October	Satria Muda Bandung	83–70	Pacific Caesar	Cibinong, Bogor
13:45	Scoring by quarter: 25–23, 19–13, 21–18, 18–16
	Pts: Diagne 27; Rebs: Bagir 10; Asts: Saputera 7	Boxscore	Pts: Tangkulung 16; Rebs: Purnomo 7 Asts: Tangkulung 6	Arena: GOR Laga Tangkas; Referees: S. Sangara, A. Rohman, D. Asmono

26 October	RANS Simba Bogor	70–57	Rajawali Medan	Cibinong, Bogor
18:30	Scoring by quarter: 14–17, 21–9, 24–16, 11–15
	Pts: Titoaji 15; Rebs: Gunawan 8 Asts: four players 4	Boxscore	Pts: Sebastian 11; Rebs: Effendy 7 Asts: Wimbardi 5	Arena: GOR Laga Tangkas; Referees: Y. Kuncara, D. Setia, R. Bakkar

27 October	Bogor Hornbills	73–50	Pacific Caesar	Cibinong, Bogor
13:45	Scoring by quarter: 20–14, 16–14, 12–9, 25–13
	Pts: Nikolas 15; Rebs: Sanjaya 6 Asts: Erga, Teja 5	Boxscore	Pts: Wibowo, Wicaksono 11; Rebs: Hernando 11; Asts: Pradhitya 6	Arena: GOR Laga Tangkas; Referees: D. Triyanto, . Rifky, R. Lesmana

28 October	Satria Muda Bandung	76–73	Rajawali Medan	Cibinong, Bogor
13:45	Scoring by quarter: 25–17, 22–27, 15–15, 14–14
	Pts: Diagne 20; Rebs: Diagne 14; Asts: Saputera 6	Boxscore	Pts: three players 12; Rebs: Syahputra 5 Asts: Wimbardi, Susanto 5	Arena: GOR Laga Tangkas; Referees: R. Lesmana, M. Nugraha, A. Rohman

28 October	Bogor Hornbills	77–73	RANS Simba Bogor	Cibinong, Bogor
16:00	Scoring by quarter: 20–20, 34–25, 14–13, 9–15
	Pts: Nuban 17; Rebs: Guntara 7 Asts: Teja 8	Boxscore	Pts: Mononimbar 20; Rebs: Gunawan 12; Asts: Mononimbar 4	Arena: GOR Laga Tangkas; Referees: B. Marfan, V. Septiansyah, M. Rizki

29 October	Pacific Caesar	66–74	Rajawali Medan	Cibinong, Bogor
13:45	Scoring by quarter: 19–18, 15–16, 14–20, 18–20
	Pts: Pradhitya 18; Rebs: Wibowo 8 Asts: Tangkulung 9	Boxscore	Pts: Effendy 17; Rebs: Effendy 13; Asts: Susanto 5	Arena: GOR Laga Tangkas; Referees: B. Marfan, R. Lesmana, R. Bakkar

29 October	Satria Muda Bandung	83–75	RANS Simba Bogor	Cibinong, Bogor
16:00	Scoring by quarter: 22–17, 21–15, 19–20, 21–23
	Pts: Saputera 17; Rebs: Diagne 6 Asts: Saputera 12	Boxscore	Pts: Mononimbar 18; Rebs: Daffa 5 Asts: Lobbu 5	Arena: GOR Laga Tangkas; Referees: Y. Kuncara, . Rifky, F. Ashari

=== Group B ===
Pos	Team	Pld	W	L	PF	PA	PD	Pts	Qualification
1	Dewa United Banten	4	4	0	267	229	+38	8	Advance to semi-finals
2	Pelita Jaya Jakarta	4	3	1	288	217	+71	7	Advance to semi-finals
3	Kesatria Bengawan Solo	4	2	2	264	261	+3	6	
4	Hangtuah JG Liem	4	1	3	218	270	−52	5	
5	Satya Wacana Salatiga	4	0	4	215	275	−60	4	

Updated to match(es) played on unknown. Source: IBL Indonesia

24 October	Hangtuah JG Liem	62–58	Satya Wacana Salatiga	Cibinong, Bogor
11:30	Scoring by quarter: 10–4, 20–14, 8–20, 24–20
	Pts: Kornelius 13; Rebs: Fauzan 9 Asts: Shihab, Hartanto 3	Boxscore	Pts: Tristan, Awarawi 12; Rebs: Bintang 11; Asts: Tristan, Awarawi 4	Arena: GOR Laga Tangkas; Referees: D. Triyanto, A. Rohman, D. Asmono

24 October	Dewa United Banten	61–59	Pelita Jaya Jakarta	Cibinong, Bogor
16:00	Scoring by quarter: 14–19, 18–8, 18–7, 11–25
	Pts: Saputra 19; Rebs: Gemilang, Vadel 7 Asts: Elbert 5	Boxscore	Pts: Jawato 13; Rebs: Jawato 9 Asts: Saudale 5	Arena: GOR Laga Tangkas; Referees: Y. Kuncara, F. Ashari, S. Sangara

25 October	Satya Wacana Salatiga	58–78	Kesatria Bengawan Solo	Cibinong, Bogor
13:45	Scoring by quarter: 10–19, 17–19, 13–17, 18–23
	Pts: Mailensun 13; Rebs: Kafiar 8 Asts: Sualang 4	Boxscore	Pts: Dhoifullah 20; Rebs: Pratama 8 Asts: Wenas, Dhoifullah 6	Arena: GOR Laga Tangkas; Referees: Y. Kuncara, M. Fazrin, R. Lesmana

25 October	Dewa United Banten	66–57	Hangtuah JG Liem	Cibinong, Bogor
16:00	Scoring by quarter: 15–7, 10–19, 18–17, 23–14
	Pts: Junior 13; Rebs: Junior, Vadel 8 Asts: Wiguna 4	Boxscore	Pts: Chan 12; Rebs: Chan 8 Asts: Shihab 3	Arena: GOR Laga Tangkas; Referees: D. Triyanto, . Rifky, M. Rizki

26 October	Pelita Jaya Jakarta	76–52	Kesatria Bengawan Solo	Cibinong, Bogor
16:00	Scoring by quarter: 23–16, 26–14, 21–9, 6–13
	Pts: Prastawa 20; Rebs: Jawato 8 Asts: Saudale 7	Boxscore	Pts: Wenas 15; Rebs: Butarbutar 6 Asts: Wenas 5	Arena: GOR Laga Tangkas; Referees: B. Marfan, M. Nugraha, M. Rizki

27 October	Dewa United Banten	63–44	Satya Wacana Salatiga	Cibinong, Bogor
16:00	Scoring by quarter: 17–12, 18–11, 12–10, 16–11
	Pts: Wibowo 14; Rebs: Junior 11; Asts: three players 3	Boxscore	Pts: Sihombing 9 Rebs: Bintang 8 Asts: Sualang, Tristan 3	Arena: GOR Laga Tangkas; Referees: S. Sangara, D. Asmono, M. Fazrin

27 October	Pelita Jaya Jakarta	81–49	Hangtuah JG Liem	Cibinong, Bogor
18:30	Scoring by quarter: 22–11, 15–14, 21–10, 23–14
	Pts: Arighi 20; Rebs: Pande 9 Asts: Prastawa 7	Boxscore	Pts: Maranata 11; Rebs: Maranata 10; Asts: Christopher 5	Arena: GOR Laga Tangkas; Referees: R. Lesmana, F. Ashari, V. Septiansyah

28 October	Hangtuah JG Liem	50–65	Kesatria Bengawan Solo	Cibinong, Bogor
18:30	Scoring by quarter: 21–19, 7–21, 9–15, 13–10
	Pts: Satrio 12; Rebs: Teemo, Maranata 5 Asts: Hartanto 5	Boxscore	Pts: Sanyudy 19; Rebs: Sanyudy 15; Asts: Dhoifullah 5	Arena: GOR Laga Tangkas; Referees: Y. Kuncara, . Rifky, D. Setia

29 October	Pelita Jaya Jakarta	72–55	Satya Wacana Salatiga	Cibinong, Bogor
11:30	Scoring by quarter: 26–16, 21–5, 12–16, 13–18
	Pts: Pande 15; Rebs: Guntara 9 Asts: four players 3	Boxscore	Pts: Kafiar 10; Rebs: three players 5 Asts: Tristan 4	Arena: GOR Laga Tangkas; Referees: D. Triyanto, M. Fazrin, D. Asmono

29 October	Dewa United Banten	77–69	Kesatria Bengawan Solo	Cibinong, Bogor
18:30	Scoring by quarter: 20–15, 26–17, 18–19, 13–18
	Pts: Gemilang, Saputra 16; Rebs: Wiguna 10; Asts: Elbert, Wibowo 5	Boxscore	Pts: Wenas 23; Rebs: Dhoifullah, Butarbutar 9 Asts: Wenas, Dhoifullah 6	Arena: GOR Laga Tangkas; Referees: R. Lesmana, S. Sangara, M. Nugraha

=== Bracket ===
Semi finals
Satria Muda Bandung	69
Pelita Jaya Jakarta	65
Dewa United Banten	75
Bogor Hornbills	72

Finals
Satria Muda Bandung	77
Dewa United Banten	75

=== Semifinals ===
31 Oct
16:00

Boxscore

Satria Muda Bandung	69–65	Pelita Jaya Jakarta
Scoring by quarter: 19–17, 15–18, 23–20, 12–10
Pts: Grahita 21; Rebs: Diagne 12; Asts: Saputera 9		Pts: Prastawa 21; Rebs: Pande 13; Asts: Prastawa 4

GOR Laga Tangkas, Cibinong, Bogor
Referees: R. Lesmana, D. Triyanto, S. Sangara

31 Oct
18:15

Boxscore

Dewa United Banten	75–72	Bogor Hornbills
Scoring by quarter: 29–20, 17–22, 14–19, 15–11
Pts: Gemilang 17; Rebs: Junior 7 Asts: Elbert 7		Pts: Teja 18; Rebs: three players 7 Asts: Teja 10

GOR Laga Tangkas, Cibinong, Bogor
Referees: B. Marfan, . Rifky, F. Ashari

=== Finals ===
1 Nov
18:15

Boxscore

Satria Muda Bandung	77–75	Dewa United Banten
Scoring by quarter: 22–23, 19–21, 19–16, 17–15
Pts: Grahita 21; Rebs: Diagne 13; Asts: Saputera 15		Pts: Saputra 17; Rebs: Saputra 11; Asts: Lakudu 7

GOR Laga Tangkas, Cibinong, Bogor
Referees: B. Marfan, R. Lesmana, D. Triyanto
