= UPH Eagles basketball team =

LIMA program

UPH Eagles
- University: Pelita Harapan University
- Head coach: (United States) Stephen L. Metcalfe
- Location: Tangerang, Indonesia
- Arena: UPH Basketball Court
- Nickname: Eagles

LIMA Champions
- 2010, 2015, 2016, 2017, 2018, 2021

The UPH Eagles basketball team represents Pelita Harapan University in Tangerang, Indonesia. They are a member of the Liga Mahasiswa (LIMA) and the Campus League. They are led by head coach Stephen Metcalfe. Over the years, the Eagles have established themselves in the Indonesian college basketball scene as the place for local players to develop, with former alumni's such as Yesaya Saudale, Muhamad Arighi, and recently Erick Ibrahim Junior.

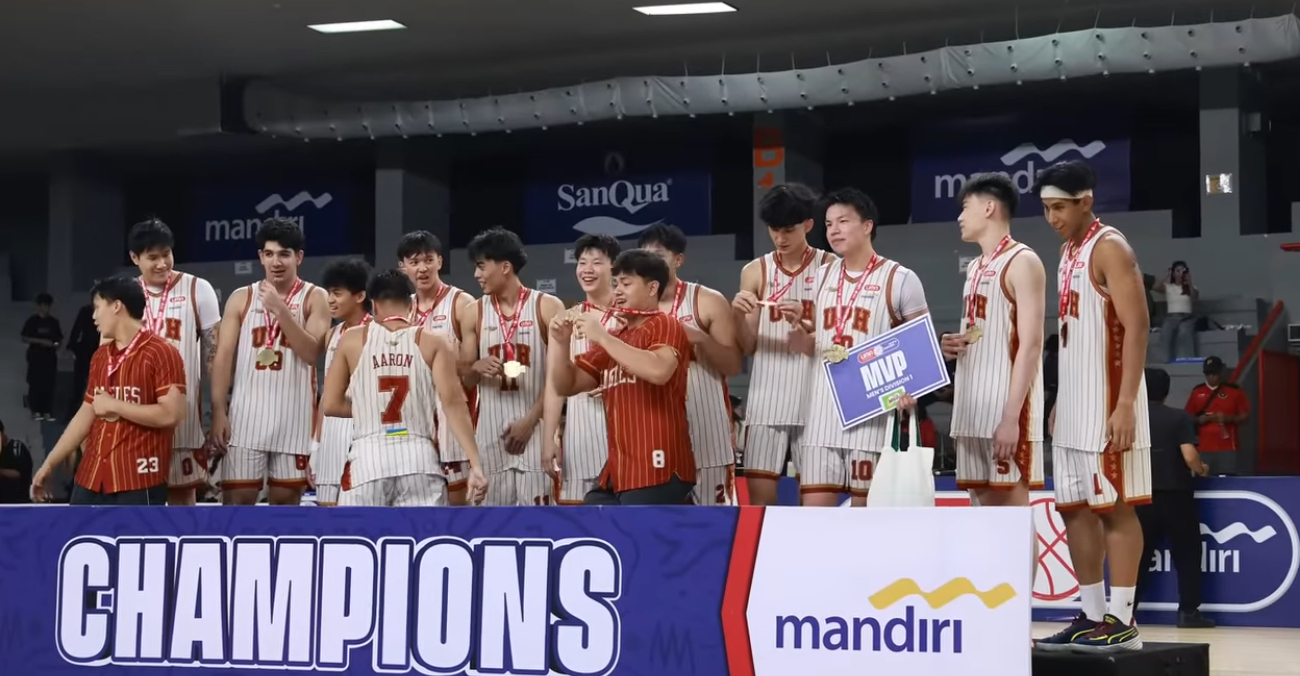
UPH Eagles team in 2025

== 2022 WUBS roster ==
UPH Eagles men's basketball team roster for the 2022 World University Basketball Series (WUBS) that was held at Shibuya, Tokyo.

UPH Eagles roster
Players
Coaches

Pos.	No.	Nat.	Name	Height	Year	High School
F	1	(Indonesia)	Aldi, Izzatur	6'4" (1.93m)	4th	SMAN 116 Jakarta
C	15	(Indonesia)	Almando, Davin	6'4" (1.93m)	1st	SMAN 71 Jakarta
F	23	(Indonesia)	Andrew, Lensun	6'2" (1.88m)	4th	SMA Lokon Tomohon
F	8	(Indonesia)	Darryl, Sebastian	6'0" (1.83m)	4th	SMA Bukit Sion Jakarta
F	30	(Indonesia)	Hosea, Kenneth	6'2" (1.88m)	2nd	SMA Ricci 1 Jakarta
C	27	(Indonesia)	Kelvin, Sanjaya	6'7" (2.01m)	4th	SMAN 1 Pekanbaru
G	10	(Indonesia)	Mario, Davidson	6'0" (1.83m)	2nd	SMA Karangturi Semarang
F	0	(Indonesia)	Ralph, Christophorus Mulia	6'0" (1.83m)	1st	SMA IPEKA PLUIT
F	24	(Indonesia)	Rivaldo, Pua Dawe	6'2" (1.88m)	2nd	SMAN 116 Jakarta
G	3	(Indonesia)	Valentius, Wongso	6'0" (1.83m)	2nd	SMA Santu Petrus Pontianak
F	23	(Indonesia)	Yofien, Dean Endrianne	6'0" (1.83m)	4th	SMAK 4 Penabur
C	21	(Indonesia)	Yosua, Otto	6'5" (1.96m)	4th	SMA Karangturi Semarang

Head coach

- (United States) Stephen Metcalfe

Legend

- (C) Team captain
- Injured

== Current roster ==
The current roster for the 2025 LIMA Basketball Jakarta Series.

Pos	Name	From	Height
F	Almando Davin	SMAN 71 Jakarta	6-4
G	Aaron Nathanael	SMA Bukit Sion Jakarta	6-0
F	Timothy Marvel Christiano	SMA Jubilee Jakarta	5'11
F	Andrew Hansen Siagian		6-1
SG	Radityo Wirananto	Olifant School Yogyakarta	5-11
F	Tan Evan Roos	SMA Trinitas Bandung	6-1
G	Erick Ibrahim Junior	SMAN 116 Jakarta	6-5
F	Jordy Lustino	SMA Dian Harapan Jakarta	6-3
G	Muhammad Endwalijri Kuswara	SMA Kharisma Bangsa	5-11
G	Bryant Citrahardja M.	UPH College Tangerang	6-0
G	Stephen Sundinata	SMA Jubilee Jakarta	6-0
G	Alexander Raphael K	SMA Bukit Sion Jakarta	5-9
F	Darvin Geraldine	SMA Santu Petrus Pontianak	6-3
C	Erwin Rostam Dokht	SMAN 6 Jakarta	6-3
F	I Nyoman Aldo Dharma	SMAN 1 Denpasar	6-1
G	Ralph Christophorus	SMA IPEKA Pluit	6-0
G	Matthew Benedictus Manuputty	SMA Bukit Sion Jakarta	5-7
G	Muhammad Ilzhar	SMA Kharisma Bangsa Tangerang	6-0
C	Laurent Valentius Gunadi	UPH College Tangerang	6-7
G	Kennie Elbert Kristanto	SMA Gloria 1 Surabaya	5-11

Official

Name	Pos
Stephen L. Metcalfe	head coach

== Seasons ==
- 2017 UPH Eagles Basketball Team
- 2018 UPH Eagles Basketball Team

== Offseason ==
=== Out ===
Name	Pos	Class	Notes	Club
Rivaldo Pangesthio (C)	SF/PF	Senior	Graduate	
Valentinus Kennard	PF	Senior	Graduate	
Vinson Leocarlius	C	Senior	Graduate	
Ferdian	PF	Senior	Graduate	
Carlen Hartono	G	Senior	Graduate	
Shamgar Galed L	G	Senior	Graduate	
Kenneth	G/F	Freshmen	Transfer	University Santa Dharma DIY

=== In ===
Name	Pos	School	City	Notes
Nickson Gosal	F/C	SMA Kesuma Mataram	Mataram	
Andrew Lensun	F/G	SMA St Nikolaus Tomohon	Manado	
Ronald Firdaus	F	Perbanas University	Jakarta	Transfer
Aldy Izzatur	F	SMA 116 Jakarta	Jakarta	
Yesaya Saudale	G	SMA 116 Jakarta	Jakarta	
Kenneth	G	UPH College	Karawaci	

== 2018–19 players and coaches ==
Players:

Pos	Name	From	Class
PG	Yesaya Saudale	SMA 116 Jakarta	Freshmen
SG	Muhamad Arighi	SMA Karisma Bangsa	Sophomore
F/G	Andrew Lensun	SMA St Nikolaus Tomohon	Freshmen
G	Winston	SMA St. Joshep	Sophomore
F	Ronald Firdaus	SMA 116 Jakarta/Perbanas University	Freshmen
C	Gabriel Senduk	SMA St Nikolaus Tomohon	Senior
F	Ramadan		RS Senior
F	Dhana P. Soegondo	SMA AL IZHAR Jakarta	Senior
F	Aldy Izzatur	SMA 116 Jakarta	Freshmen
C	Eric Gosal	Dian Hardpan School Makassar	Senior
F/C	Nickson Gosal	SMA Kesuma Mataram	Freshmen
G/F	Adiez Manafe	SMAK St Albertus Malang	RS Senior
G	Yefanus Rendika	SMA Bukit Sion Jakarta	Senior
G	Adrian Danny Christianto	SMA Kanaan	Senior
C	Joshua Otto	SMA Karang Turi	Sophomore
G	Joseph DeSmith	Diatmika Schools Bali	Junior
PF	Nikolas Patrick	Jakarta, DKI Jakarta	Junior

Coaching staff:

Name	Pos
Stephen L. Metcalfe	head coach
Andromeda Manuputty	coach

=== LIMA seasons ===
Years	Pos	MVP Final	Coach
2012–13	2	-	Stephen L. Metcalfe
2013–14	3	-	Stephen L. Metcalfe
2014–15	1	RIvaldo Pangestio	Stephen L. Metcalfe
2015–16	1	RIvaldo Pangestio (2)	Stephen L. Metcalfe
2017	1	RIvaldo Pangestio (3)	Stephen L. Metcalfe
2018	1	Yesaya Saudale	Stephen L. Metcalfe

== Players in the IBL ==
Years	Name	Pos	Club	Awards
2016	Laurentius Steven Oei	PF/C	Dewa United Banten	Champion IBL (2018)
2016	Cassiopeia Manuputty	G	Free agent	
2022	Darryl Winata Sebastian	G	Rajawali Medan	
2021	Nickson Damara Gosal	C	Pelita Jaya Basketball Club	
2021	Patrick Nikolas	F	Dewa United Banten	Champion IBL (2025)
2015	Hans Abraham	G	Bogor Hornbills	Champion IBL (2023)
2014	Jeremy Ranty	G	RETIRED	
2017	Christian Gunawan	G	RETIRED	Champion IBL (2018)
2020	Winston Swenjaya	PG	Tangerang Hawks	
2016	Juan Laurent Kokodiputra	F/G	Satria Muda Bandung	Champion IBL (2018) Rookie of the Year (2017)
2021	Yesaya Saudale	G	Tangerang Hawks	Indonesia Cup Preseason Champion (2022)
2014	Kristian Liem	C	Dewa United Banten	Rookie of the Year (2015)
2020	Yosua Otto	C	Tangerang Hawks	
2020	Muhamad Arighi	G	Pelita Jaya Basketball Club	Indonesia Cup Preseason Champion (2022)
2017	Rivaldo Tandra Panghestio	SF	RETIRED	
2021	Kelvin Sanjaya	C	Bogor Hornbills	
2022	Aldi Izzatur	G	Pelita Jaya Basketball Club	Indonesia Cup Preseason Champion (2022)
2022	Jacob Lobbu	PG	Pelita Jaya Basketball Club	First pick of the 2022 IBL Draft
2022	Andrew Lensun	PG	Pelita Jaya Basketball Club	
2020	Andrian Danny Christianto	SG	Rajawali Medan	
2020	Joseph Desmet	PG	Free agent	
2015	Papin Nadapdap	G	RETIRED	
2025	Erick Ibrahim Junior	SG	Dewa United Banten	Champion IBL (2025)
2025	Almando Davin	F	Bogor Hornbills	
2025	Radityo Wirananto	SG	Bogor Hornbills	
2025	Kennie Elbert	PG	Dewa United Banten	
2025	Hosea Kenneth	SG	Satria Muda Bandung	
