= Steph Branch =

American basketball player (born 1995)

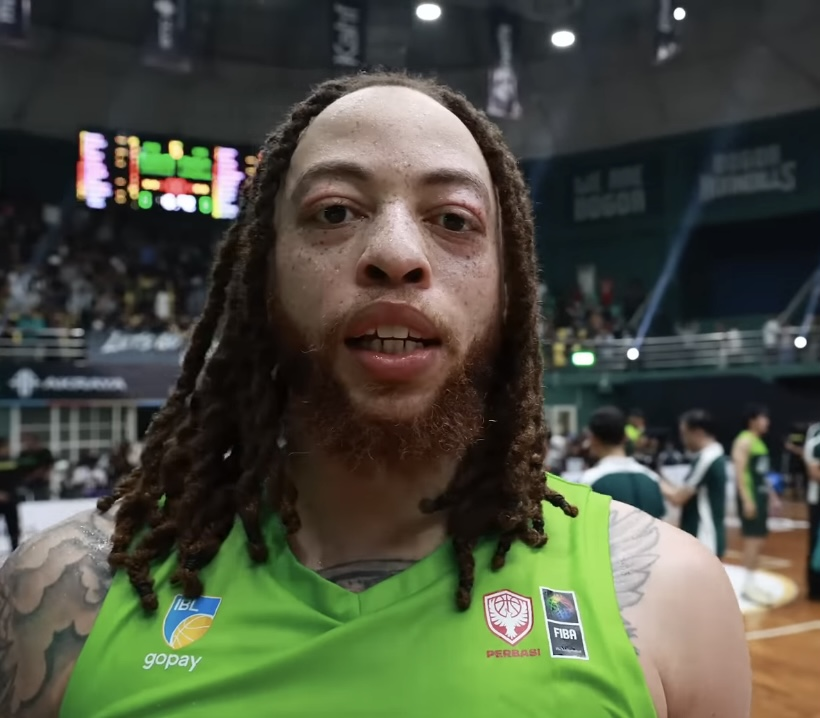
- Branch with Bogor Hornbills in 2026

No. 0 – Bogor Hornbills
- Position: Shooting guard
- League: IBL

Personal information
- Born: November 7, 1995 (age 31) San Bernardino County, California, U.S.
- Listed height: 6 ft 5 in (1.96 m)
- Listed weight: 207 lb (94 kg)

Career information
- High school: Upland (Upland, California)
- College: Mt. SAC (2013–2015); West Georgia (2015–2017)
- NBA draft: 2017: undrafted
- Playing career: 2017–present

Career history
- 2017–2018: South Bay Lakers
- 2018–2019: Salt Lake City Stars
- 2019: Ura Basket
- 2019–2021: Antwerp Giants
- 2021–2022: Ironi Nahariya
- 2022: Urunday Universitario
- 2023: Donar Groningen
- 2023–2024: CS Vâlcea 1924
- 2024: Ángeles de la Ciudad de México
- 2024: Patriots BBC
- 2024–2025: Tangerang Hawks
- 2025–present: Bogor Hornbills

Career highlights
- IBL champion (2026); 2× IBL All-Star (2025, 2026)
- Stats at Basketball Reference

Stephaun Bradford Branch (born November 7, 1995) is an American professional basketball player for the Bogor Hornbills of the Indonesian Basketball League (IBL). He previously played college basketball for Mt. San Antonio College and the West Georgia Wolves.

== College career ==
Branch began his college career at Mt. San Antonio College in Walnut, California, where he spent two years before joining the Wolves of the West Georgia University of the NCAA Division II in 2015, where he played two seasons, averaging 16.4 points, 7.3 rebounds, 1.9 assists and 1.3 blocks per game. He was included in both seasons in the best team of the Gulf South Conference.

== Professional career ==
After going undrafted in the 2017 NBA Draft, Branch signed with the South Bay Lakers of the NBA G League, where he played one season, averaging 10.6 points and 5.8 rebounds per game off the bench. At the start of the following season, he played in the NBA Summer League with the Los Angeles Lakers, averaging 1.9 points and 1.8 rebounds in the nine games he played.

In December 5, 2024 Branch joins the Tangerang Hawks of the Indonesian Basketball League (IBL).

On December 25, 2025, Branch joins the Bogor Hornbills of the Indonesian Basketball League. At the Hawks, he averaged 20 PPG, 7,8 RPG, and 5,5 APG in 23 games played.
