= IBL Foreign Player of the Year =

Basketball award

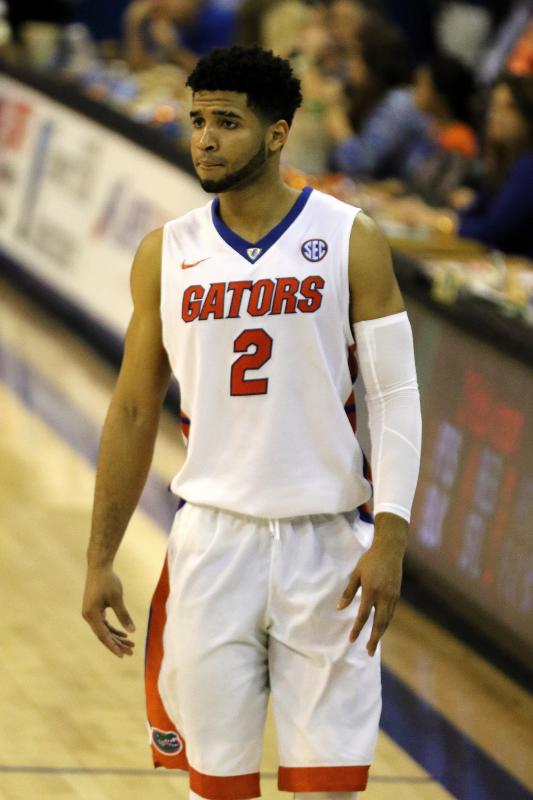
Brandone Francis won the award in 2023

The IBL League Most Valuable Player Award, is an annual Indonesian Basketball League award given since the 2017 season. It is awarded to the league's best foreign/import player for his team.

== Winners ==
Year	Player	Nationality	Team	Ref
2017	Gary Jacobs Jr.	United States	NSH Jakarta	
2018	David Seagers	United States	Pacific Caesar Surabaya	
2019	Madarious Gibbs	United States	Satya Wacana Salatiga	
2020	Mike Glover	United States	NSH Jakarta	
2021	N/A	—N/a	N/A	
2022	Shavar Newkirk	United States	NSH Mountain Gold Timika	
2023	Brandone Francis	Dominican Republic	Prawira Bandung	
2024	Kentrell Barkley	United States	Kesatria Bengawan Solo	
2025	K. J. McDaniels	United States	Pelita Jaya Bakrie	
2026	Travin Thibodeaux	United States	Bogor Hornbills	

== Awards won by club ==
Club	Total
NSH Jakarta/Mountain Gold	3
Prawira Bandung	1
Pacific Caesar	1
Satya Wacana	1
Kesatria Bengawan Solo	1
Pelita Jaya	1
Bogor Hornbills	1

== Awards won by nationality ==
Country	Total
United States	8
Dominican Republic	1

== See also ==
- IBL Rookie of the Year
- All-IBL Indonesian Team
