= Fhirdan Guntara =

Indonesian basketball player (born 1998)

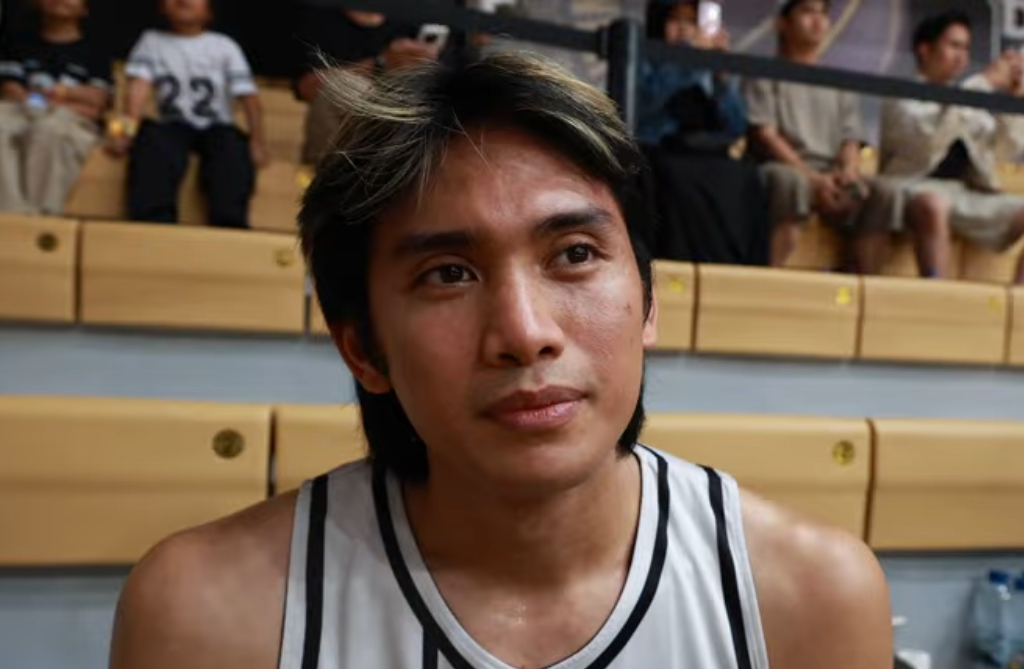
- Fhirdan in 2026

No. 77 – Bogor Hornbills
- Position: Small forward
- League: IBL

Personal information
- Born: 9 February 1998 (age 28) Bandung, Indonesia
- Listed height: 184 cm (6 ft 0 in)
- Listed weight: 80 kg (176 lb)

Career information
- High school: SMAN 9 (Bandung, Indonesia)
- College: ITHB (2015-2020)
- Playing career: 2021–present

Career history
- 2021-2025: Prawira Bandung
- 2025-present: Bogor Hornbills

Career highlights
- 2× IBL champion (2023, 2026); 2× IBL All-Star (2024, 2026); LIMA champion (2019)

Muhammad Fhirdan Maulana Guntara (born 9 February 1998) is an Indonesian professional basketball player who plays for the Bogor Hornbills of the Indonesian Basketball League (IBL). He played college basketball for the ITHB Arrows.

== Early career ==
Represented the West Java province and won the gold medal for basketball at the 2016 Pekan Olahraga Nasional .

== College career ==
Fhirdan played college basketball for the ITHB Arrows alongside his current teammate Yudha, and they both won the LIMA championship in 2019.

== Personal life ==
Fhirdan has an older brother, Reza. They used to play alongside before he left Prawira to play for Pelita Jaya Bakrie.
