= Travin Thibodeaux =

American basketball player (born 1996)

No. 25 – Bogor Hornbills
- Position: Power forward
- League: IBL

Personal information
- Born: 19 February 1996 (age 30)
- Listed height: 6 ft 8 in (2.03 m)
- Listed weight: 234 lb (106 kg)

Career information
- High school: Brusly (Brusly, Louisiana)
- College: New Orleans (2014–2018)
- NBA draft: 2018: undrafted
- Playing career: 2018–present

Career history
- 2018–2020: Fort Wayne Mad Ants
- 2021: BC Kyiv-Basket
- 2021: Saskatchewan Rattlers
- 2021–2022: BC Balkan Botevgrad
- 2022–2023: APOEL B.C.
- 2023–2024: Manama Club
- 2024: Shabab Al Ahli
- 2024: Kesatria Bengawan Solo
- 2024: Al Riyadi Beirut
- 2025: Kesatria Bengawan Solo
- 2026–present: Bogor Hornbills

Career highlights
- IBL champion (2026); IBL Finals MVP (2026); BCL Asia All-Star Five (2024); All-IBL Defensive Team (2025); Indonesian Basketball League MVP (2026); All-IBL First Team (2026)

Travin Marquell Thibodeaux (born February 19, 1996) is an American professional basketball player for the Bogor Hornbills of the Indonesian Basketball League (IBL). He played college basketball for the New Orleans Privateers. Standing at 6 ft 8 in (2.03 m), he plays the power forward position.

== Early career ==
Thibodeaux attended Brusly High School in Brusly, Louisiana, averaging 17.1 points, 15.3 rebounds and 3.9 blocks as a senior.

He garnered All-District 7-3A honors in his final two seasons, earning second team recognition as a junior and first team as a senior while also awarded Defensive MVP.

== College career ==
Thibodeaux spent all four years of his collegiate eligibility with the University of New Orleans Privateers (NCAA Division 1). Over the course of his four-year collegiate career, Thibodeaux gained recognition for his defensive tenacity, as well as his ability to put the ball in the basket.

Thibodeaux averaged 8.4 points, 5.8 rebounds and 1.9 assists over the course of his four-year career. As a junior, Thibodeaux led the University of New Orleans in assists (104), while ranking second in rebounds (233) and rebounds per game (7.3). In his senior year for the Privateers, Thibodeaux led the team in scoring 16.2 points per game, field goal percentage (54.2), rebounds (5.8), free throws (89), steals (39) and blocks (29).

Thibodeaux’s impressive collegiate career earned him a multitude of accolades including the National Association of Basketball Coaches 2017-2018 All-District (23) First Team, as well as the 2016-2017 Southland All-Defensive Team and Southland All-Academic Second Team.

== Professional career ==
=== Fort Wayne Mad Ants ===
After going undrafted in the 2018 NBA draft, Thibodeaux joined the Indiana Pacers' NBA G League affiliate, the Noblesville Boom, which was still known as Fort Wayne Mad Ants at the time. In his two years, he averaged 6.2 points, 5.4 rebounds, and 1.6 assists in 61 games.

=== BC Kyiv ===
On 13 January 2021, Thibodeaux signed with The BC Kyiv-Basket of Ukrainian Basketball SuperLeague.

=== Saskatchewan Rattlers ===
On 1 April 2021, Thibodeaux signed with The Saskatchewan Rattlers, member club of the Canadian Elite Basketball League.

=== BC Balkan Botevgrad ===
On 1 September 2021, Thibodeaux signed with The BC Balkan Botevgrad of the National Basketball League (Bulgaria).

=== APOEL B.C. ===
On 12 February 2022, Thibodeaux started to play for Cypriot professional basketball club based in the city of Nicosia, APOEL B.C..

=== Manama Club ===
On 7 July 2023, Thibodeaux signed with The Manama Club, member club of the Bahraini Premier League.

=== Shabab Al Ahli Club Dubai ===
In June 2024, Thibodeaux signed with The Shabab Al Ahli, member club of the UAE National Basketball League based in the city of Dubai.

He represented Shabab Al Ahli in the inaugural 2024 Basketball Champions League Asia. Appearing in five games, he helped the team finish as runners-up in the tournament. He averaged 14.8 points, 9.8 rebounds, and 2.8 assists per game, earning selection to the tournament's All-Star Five.

=== Kesatria Bengawan Solo ===
On 26 June 2024, Thibodeaux signed with The Kesatria Bengawan Solo, of the Indonesian Basketball League in the middle of ongoing season, replacing Taylor Johns. In his 6 matches with the Kesatria Bengawan, he averaged 22.83 points, 10 rebounds, and 3.5 assists.

=== Al Riyadi Club Beirut ===
On 28 August 2024, The Lebanese Basketball League defending champion, Al Riyadi Club Beirut, agreed terms with Thibodeaux to play for the 2024 FIBA Intercontinental Cup.

=== Return to Kesatria Bengawan Solo ===
On 23 November 2024, Thibodeaux re-joined the Kesatria Bengawan Solo for the 2025 IBL season. By averaging 7.0 defensive rebounds and 1.4 steals per game, he earned a place on the 2025 IBL All-Defensive Team.

=== Bogor Hornbills ===
In December 2025, after spending two seasons with the Kesatria Bengawan Solo, Thibodeaux joined fellow IBL club the Bogor Hornbills for his third season. In 20 regular-season games, he averaged 25.9 points, 9.3 rebounds, 3.7 assists, and 2.0 steals per game.

His performances helped improve the Bogor Hornbills' fortunes, leading the team from missing the playoffs the previous season to finishing third in the final standings of the 2026 IBL season. As a result of his contributions, he earned a place on the 2026 All-IBL First Team, while also named as the 2026 IBL Most Valuable Player.
