= Jordan Ivy-Curry =

American basketball player

Free agent
- Position: Point guard / shooting guard

Personal information
- Born: March 14, 2002 (age 24) La Marque, Texas, U.S.
- Listed height: 6 ft 1 in (1.85 m)
- Listed weight: 83 kg (183 lb)

Career information
- High school: La Marque (La Marque, Texas)
- College: UTSA (2020–2022; 2023–2024); Pacific (2022–2023); UCF (2024–2025)
- NBA draft: 2025: undrafted
- Playing career: 2025–present

Career history
- 2025–2026: Satria Muda Bandung

Career highlights
- IBL All-Star (2026); CUSA All-Freshman Team (2021)

Jordan Treyvon Ivy-Curry (born March 14, 2002), commonly nicknamed Juice, is an American professional basketball who last played for Satria Muda Bandung of the Indonesian Basketball League (IBL). He played college basketball for the UTSA Roadrunners, Pacific Tigers, and the UCF Knights.

== College career ==
=== UTSA Roadrunners (2020–2022; 2023–2024) ===
Ivy-Curry, earned C-USA All-Freshman Team honors at UTSA, played in all 26 games with 11 starts and averaged 7.2 points, 1.5 assists and 2.8 rebounds per game, he played 19.9 minutes per game. On his sophomore year he averaged 13.9 points per game, which ranked second on the team, and added 2.3 rebounds and 1.9 assists. Scored in double figures 15 times, including scoring a season-high 27 points in a win over Denver on November 16, 2021.

=== Pacific Tigers (2022–2023) ===
Appeared in 33 games and earned the start in seven games played. Averaged 10.3 points per game and added 2.6 rebounds per game and 50 assists on the season. Scored a season-high 25 points in a win over San Diego Toreros on February 11, 2023.

=== UCF Knights (2024–2025) ===
At UCF, Ivy-Curry averaged 13.1 points per game. Scored a season-high 29 points against the Nebraska Cornhuskers on April 6, 2025, while going 12-for-22 from the field and 3-for-9 from deep.

== Professional career ==
Ivy-Curry went undrafted in the 2025 NBA draft, but had tryouts with the Osceola Magic of the NBA G League.

On December 8, 2025, Ivy-Curry joined Satria Muda Bandung of the Indonesian Basketball League (IBL) as his first-ever professional team. He plays alongside former UCF Knights player, Chad Brown.
