= Yesaya Saudale =

Indonesian basketball player

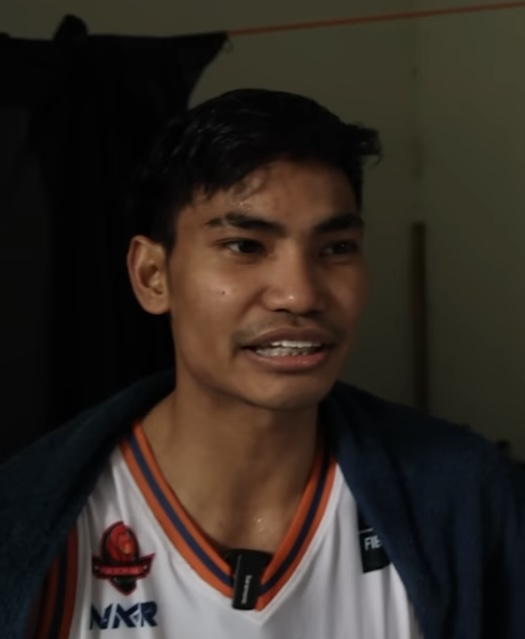
- Yesaya with Pelita Jaya in 2022

Pelita Jaya
- Position: Point guard
- League: IBL

Personal information
- Born: 14 January 2000 (age 26) Denpasar, Indonesia
- Listed height: 178 cm (5 ft 10 in)
- Listed weight: 63 kg (139 lb)

Career information
- High school: SMAN 116 (Jakarta, Indonesia)
- College: UPH
- Playing career: 2021–present

Career history
- 2021: Pelita Jaya
- 2021-2022: →Indonesia Patriots
- 2022-2025: Pelita Jaya
- 2025-2026: Tangerang Hawks
- 2026-present: Pelita Jaya

Career highlights
- IBL champion (2024); All-IBL Indonesian First Team (2026); 2× IBL All-Star (2023, 2026); IBL Most Improved Player (2026); IBL Indonesia Cup champion (2022); LIMA Most Valuable Player (2018); 2× LIMA champion (2018, 2021); LIMA Finals MVP (2018)

Yesaya Alessandro Michael Joseph Saudale (born January 14, 2000) is an Indonesian professional basketball player for the Pelita Jaya Basketball Club of the Indonesian Basketball League (IBL). He played college basketball for the UPH Eagles.

== Career ==
Saudale has represented the province of Jakarta in 2021 Pekan Olahraga Nasional where he won the gold medal for Basketball.

Was drafted 15th overall in the recommended round of the 2022 IBL Draft.

== High school career ==
In high school, Saudale was part of the most prestigious basketball school in all of Indonesia, SMA Ragunan or SMAN 116 Jakarta, which is known for producing top basketball talents for the country. At Ragunan he won the DBL 3x3 National Championship in 2016.

== College career ==
In 2018, Saudale committed to play for the UPH Eagles of the Pelita Harapan University, where he won two LIMA Championships in 2018 and 2021.

== National team career ==
Has been a member of Indonesia's national basketball team at several occasions, including Indonesia's under-18.
