= Dio Tirta Saputra =

Indonesian basketball player

Dio Tirta Saputa
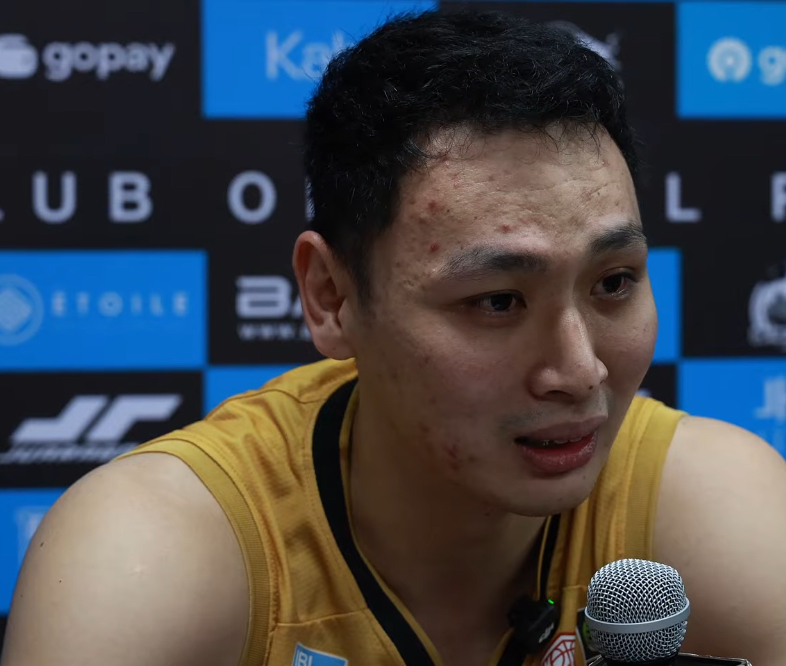
- Dio Tirta in 2026

No. 25 – Dewa United Banten
- Position: Shooting guard / small forward
- League: IBL

Personal information
- Born: 9 November 1998 (age 28) Malang, Indonesia
- Listed height: 191 cm (6 ft 3 in)
- Listed weight: 75 kg (165 lb)

Career information
- College: State University of Malang
- Playing career: 2020–present

Career history
- 2020-present: Louvre Surabaya / Dewa United Banten

Career highlights
- IBL champion (2025); IBL All-Star (2026); All-IBL Indonesian Second Team (2026)

Dio Tirta Saputra (born 9 November 1998) is an Indonesian professional basketball player for Dewa United Banten of the Indonesian Basketball League (IBL).

== Professional career ==
After graduating, Dio went to Surabaya to enter trials for Louvre Surabaya in 2020.

On 18 November 2025, Dio signs an extended contract for Dewa United Banten. Dio is also one of the first-generation of players for Louvre Surabaya.
