= Samuel Devin Susanto =

Indonesian basketball player

No. 20 – Rajawali Medan
- Position: Point guard
- League: IBL

Personal information
- Born: 27 March 1998 (age 28) Surakarta, Indonesia
- Listed height: 178 cm (5 ft 10 in)
- Listed weight: 72 kg (159 lb)

Career information
- High school: Regina Pacis School (Surakarta, Indonesia)
- College: Sebelas Maret University
- Playing career: 2020–present

Career history
- 2020-2023: Bima Perkasa Jogja
- 2023: Dewa United Banten
- 2023-2025: Kesatria Bengawan Solo
- 2025-present: Rajawali Medan

Career highlights
- IBL Rookie of the Year (2021)

Samuel Devin Susanto (born March 27, 1998) is an Indonesian professional basketball player for the Rajawali Medan of the Indonesian Basketball League (IBL).

At Regina Pacis School, Samuel was selected as a 2015 DBL All-Star.
