= David Nuban =

Indonesian basketball player

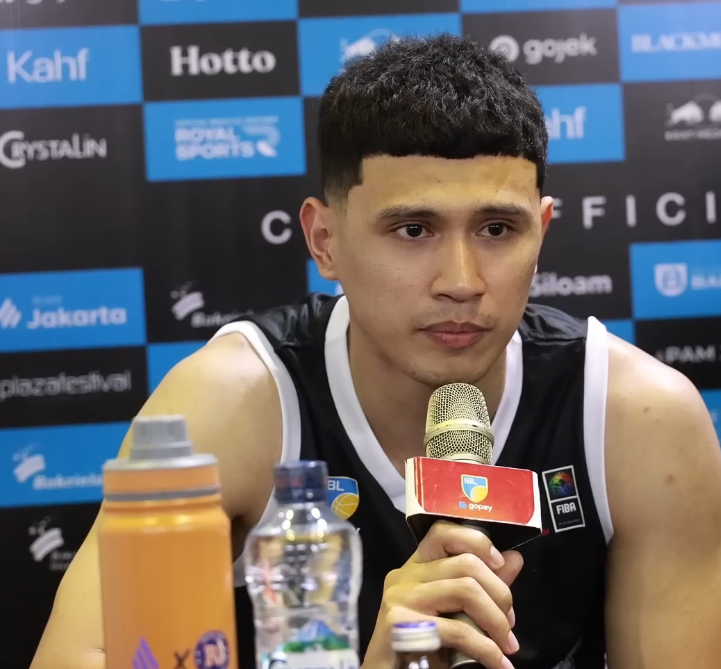
- David with the Bogor Hornbills in 2026

No. 17 – Bogor Hornbills
- Position: Small forward
- League: IBL

Personal information
- Born: 24 July 1998 (age 28) Palopo, Indonesia
- Listed height: 186 cm (6 ft 1 in)
- Listed weight: 85 kg (187 lb)

Career information
- High school: SMAN 3 (Palopo, Indonesia)
- College: Satya Wacana Christian University
- Playing career: 2016–present

Career history
- 2016-2021: Satya Wacana Saints
- 2021-2024: RANS Simba Bogor
- 2024-2025: Prawira Bandung
- 2025-present: Bogor Hornbills

Career highlights
- IBL champion (2026); 2× IBL All-Star (2020, 2026)

David Liberty Nuban (born 24 July 1998) often nicknamed Papen, is an Indonesian professional basketball player for the Bogor Hornbills of the Indonesian Basketball League (IBL).

== Professional career ==
On 20 September 2024, David joins Prawira Bandung, he averaged 7,7 PPG last season for RANS Simba Bogor.

On 13 August 2025, David joins Bogor Hornbills. On 19 February 2026, David officially joins the 1.000 points club in the Indonesian Basketball League (IBL), when their team won 109–76 against Dewa United Banten BC.
