= Restu Dwi Purnomo =

Indonesian basketball player

Pacific Caesar
- Position: Power forward
- League: IBL

Personal information
- Born: March 11, 1993 (age 33) Tulungagung, Indonesia
- Listed height: 6 ft 3.7 in (1.92 m)
- Listed weight: 198 lb (90 kg)

Career information
- Playing career: 2014–present

Career history
- 2014–2025: Bima Perkasa Yoyakarta / Bimasakti Nikko Steel Malang
- 2026–present: Pacific Caesar

Restu Dwi Purnomo (born March 19, 1992), is an Indonesian professional basketball player who plays for the Pacific Caesar of the Indonesian Basketball League (IBL).

== National team career ==
Purnomo represented Indonesia's national basketball team at the 2016 SEABA Cup, alongside his teammate Barra Sugianto.

== Controversy ==
In the start of the 2022 IBL Season precisely on March 23, 2022, there were allegations to Purnomo, the allegations were racist remarks towards Bumi Borneo's import player, Austin Mofunanya, that event happened in the middle of the game. After that Purnomo uploaded a clarification video to his social media account.
