= Antoni Erga =

Indonesian basketball player

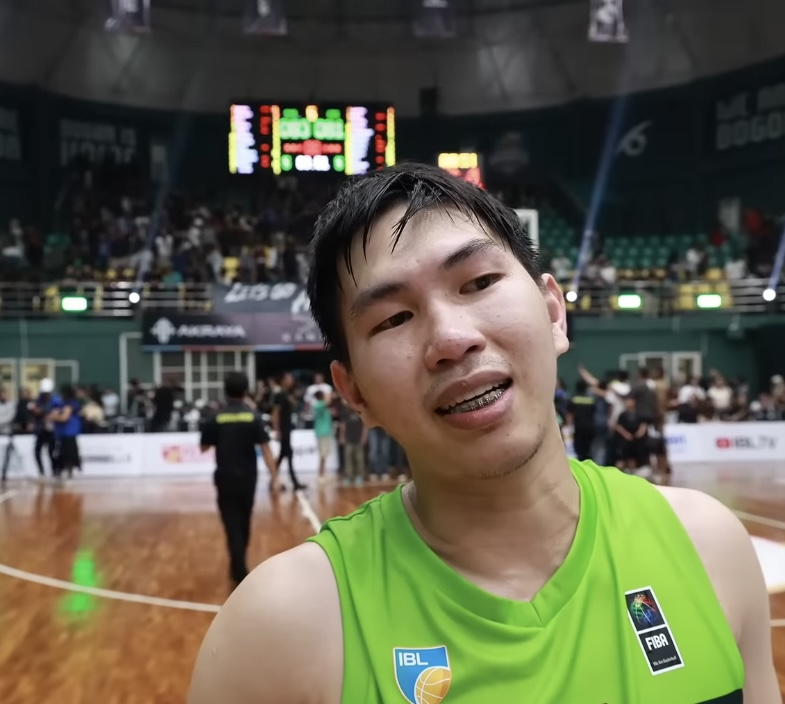
- Antoni with Bogor Hornbills in 2026

No. 2 – Bogor Hornbills
- Position: Point guard
- League: IBL

Personal information
- Born: 6 May 2000 (age 26) Bangka Belitung, Indonesia
- Listed height: 179 cm (5 ft 10 in)
- Listed weight: 78 kg (172 lb)

Career information
- High school: SMA Bakti Pangkalpinang (Bangka Belitung, Indonesia)
- College: Satya Wacana Christian University
- Playing career: 2019–present

Career history
- 2019-2021: Satya Wacana Saints
- 2021-2025: Satria Muda Pertamina
- 2025-present: Bogor Hornbills

Career highlights
- 3× IBL champion (2021, 2022, 2026); All-IBL Indonesian First Team (2026); IBL All-Star (2026)

Antoni Erga (born May, 6 2000) is an Indonesian professional basketball player for the Bogor Hornbills of the Indonesian Basketball League (IBL). He played college basketball for Satya Wacana Christian University. He also helped Satria Muda Pertamina win back-to-back championships.

== Professional career ==
In the 2020 IBL Season, Antoni was nominated in the Rookie of the Year Award. In 17,1 minutes played, he averaged 3,0 PPG, 2,5 RPG, and 1,1 APG.

During his time with Satria Muda, Antoni contributed to several of the club's achievements, including winning the 2022 IBL championship, as well as finishing as runner-up in the 2022 Indonesia Cup and the 2024 IBL Tokopedia.

On December 16, 2025, Antoni joins Bogor Hornbills.

== National team career ==
Antoni represented the Indonesia Patriots in the International Basketball Invitational (IIBI). Against Syria, Antoni dropped 25 points, 2 rebounds, and 4 assists.
