= Daffa Dhoifullah =

Indonesian basketball player

No. 9 – Kesatria Bengawan Solo
- Position: Point guard / shooting guard
- League: IBL

Personal information
- Born: August 1, 2003 (age 23) Banyuwangi, Indonesia
- Listed height: 185 cm (6 ft 1 in)
- Listed weight: 77 kg (170 lb)

Career information
- High school: Nation Star Academy (Surabaya, Indonesia)
- College: Airlangga University
- Playing career: 2022–present

Career history
- 2022–2026: Pacific Caesar
- 2026–present: Kesatria Bengawan Solo

Career highlights
- 2× IBL All-Star (2024, 2026); All-IBL Indonesian Second Team (2026); IBL Future stars challenge champion (2026)

Daffa Dhoifullah (born 1 August 2003) is an Indonesian professional basketball player for Kesatria Bengawan Solo of the Indonesian Basketball League (IBL).

== Personal life ==
Daffa is the son of Abdul Faruq Eriyono and Naning Setyorini.

== Professional career ==
In his debut season in 2022, Daffa played five games. In 2023, he averaged 7.8 points, 3.1 rebounds, and 2.8 assists over 29 games. In the 2024 season, Daffa averaged 8.2 points, 3 rebounds, and 1.7 assists over 26 appearances, earning IBL All-Star honors. He was also nominated for the 2024 IBL Most Improved Player award, and ranked first in the Pacific's player rankings.
