= IBL =

IBL may refer to:

== Technology ==
- International Brain Laboratory, a collaborative research group in neuroscience
- Image-based lighting, an image rendering technique
- Inbred backcross lines, a breeding technique
- InBound Links, a metric used by search engines
- Instance-based learning, a family of machine learning algorithms (e.g. KNN, PEL-C, IBL-1, IBL-2 and IBL-3)
- Indigo Bay Lodge Airport, an airport in Mozambique (IATA code IBL)
- Ion beam lithography, a microfabrication technique

== Sports ==
- Indonesian Basketball League, formerly called the National Basketball League
- Indian Badminton League
- Intercounty Baseball League, a baseball league in Canada
- International Basketball League (1999–2001), basketball league in the United States
- International Basketball League (2005–2014), a basketball league in the United States
- Italian Baseball League
- Israel Baseball League

== Other ==
- In before lock, an Internet slang
- Inquiry-based learning, a teaching method
- International Brotherhood of Longshoremen, a labor union in North America
- Industrial Bus Lines, an American bus company
