= Dennis Clifford =

American basketball player (born 1992)

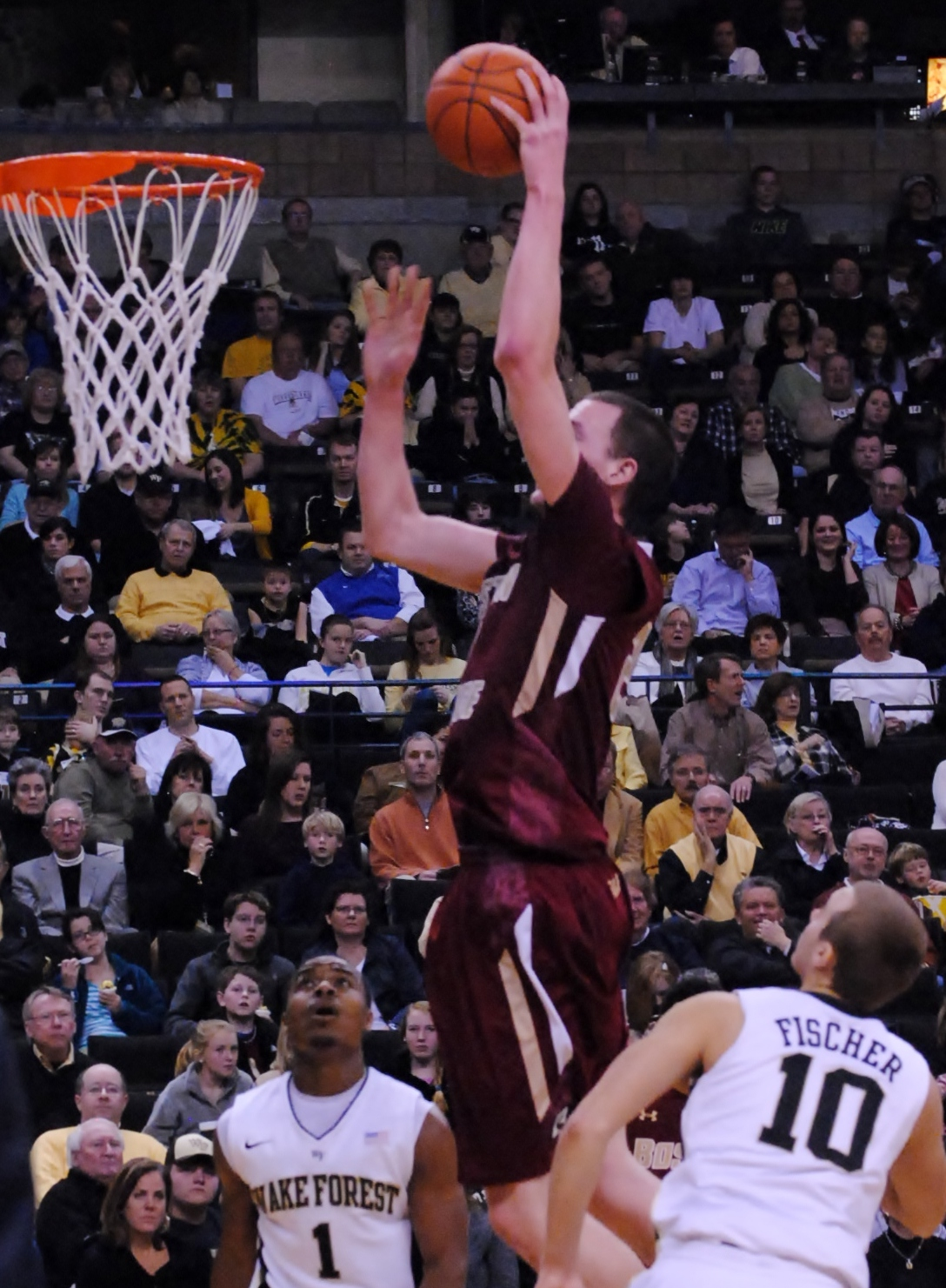

Personal information
- Born: February 29, 1992 (age 34) Bridgewater, Massachusetts, U.S.
- Listed height: 7 ft 1 in (2.16 m)
- Listed weight: 260 lb (118 kg)

Career information
- High school: Bridgewater-Raynham (Bridgewater, Massachusetts); Milton Academy (Milton, Massachusetts)
- College: Boston College (2011–2016)
- NBA draft: 2016: undrafted
- Playing career: 2016–present
- Position: Center

Career history
- 2016–2017: Santa Cruz Warriors
- 2017–2019: Alba Berlin
- 2019: Igokea
- 2020: Delaware Blue Coats
- 2020–2021: Rasta Vechta
- 2021–2022: Benfica
- 2024–2025: Rajawali Medan

Career highlights
- Portuguese League champion (2022)

Dennis John Clifford (born February 29, 1992) is an American professional basketball player for the Rajawali Medan of the Indonesian Basketball League (IBL).

== College career ==
Clifford played college basketball for Boston College. He was named team captain after his sophomore year. As a senior, he posted 9.9 points per game and 7.3 rebounds per game. He missed a game in December 2015 due to an illness, thought to be linked to an E. coli outbreak at a Chipotle.

On January 16, 2012, Clifford was selected ACC Rookie of the Week after averaging 15 points and 5.5 rebounds per game.

== Professional career ==
=== Santa Cruz Warriors (2016–2017) ===
After going undrafted in the 2016 NBA draft, Clifford joined the Santa Cruz Warriors of the NBA Development League. He posted 11.9 points on 59 percent shooting and 8.1 rebounds per contest. He was selected to play at the 2017 NBA G League All-Star Game. However, he had a stress fracture of the left fibula and missed every game for the Warriors after March 4.

=== Alba Berlin (2017–2019) ===
On July 24, 2017, Clifford was reported to have signed with Alba Berlin to a one-year deal. On July 19, 2018, Clifford was reported to have extended his contract with Alba Berlin for another season. Clifford injured his patellar tendon in September 2018.

=== Igokea (2019) ===
On July 22, 2019, Clifford was reported to have signed with KK Igokea. On November 12, 2019, Clifford was reported to have parted way with KK Igokea by mutual agreement.

=== Delaware Blue Coats (2020) ===
On February 22, 2020, the Delaware Blue Coats announced that they had acquired Clifford from the Austin Spurs in exchange for a 2nd-round draft pick in the 2020 NBA G League Draft.

=== Rasta Vechta (2020–2021) ===
On July 27, 2020, Rasta Vechta of the Basketball Bundesliga announced that they had signed with Clifford.

=== Benfica (2021–2022) ===
On August 19, 2021, Clifford signed with Benfica of the Liga Portuguesa de Basquetebol.

=== Rajawali Medan (2024–present) ===
In December 2024, Clifford signed with the Rajawali Medan of the Indonesian Basketball League (IBL).

== Personal life ==
Clifford is the son of Karyn and Kevin Clifford. He has two sisters.
