= Jeff Withey =

American basketball player (born 1990)

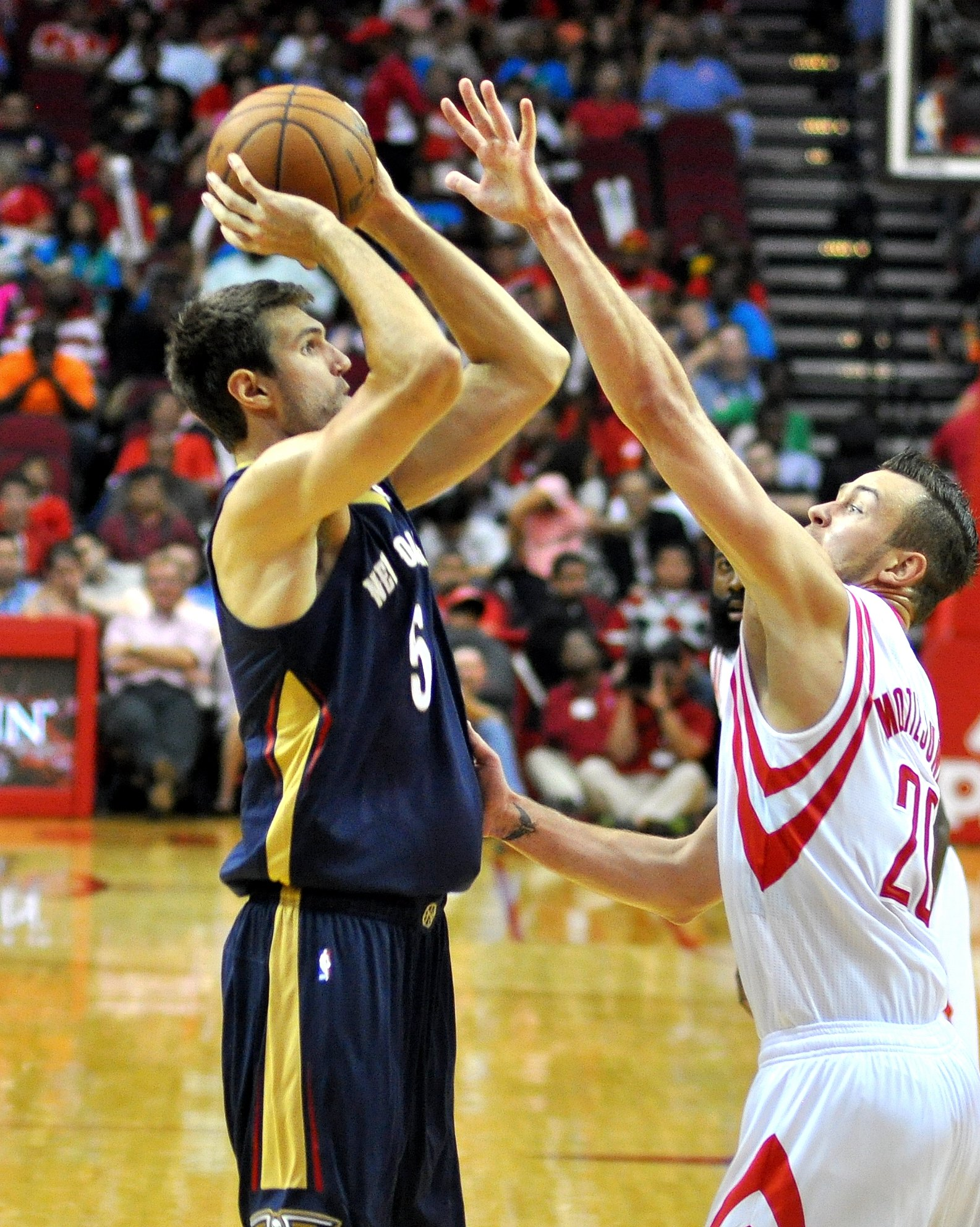
- Withey shooting over Donatas Motiejūnas in a preseason game in 2013

No. 55 – Pelita Jaya
- Position: Center
- League: IBL

Personal information
- Born: March 7, 1990 (age 36) San Diego, California, U.S.
- Listed height: 7 ft 0 in (2.13 m)
- Listed weight: 230 lb (104 kg)

Career information
- High school: Horizon (San Diego, California)
- College: Kansas (2009–2013)
- NBA draft: 2013: 2nd round, 39th overall pick
- Drafted by: Portland Trail Blazers
- Playing career: 2013–present

Career history
- 2013–2015: New Orleans Pelicans
- 2015–2017: Utah Jazz
- 2017: Dallas Mavericks
- 2018: Tofaş
- 2019: Lavrio
- 2019–2020: Ironi Nes Ziona
- 2020–2021: Goyang Orion Orions
- 2021–2023: Bilbao
- 2023–2024: Wonju DB Promy
- 2024–2025: Taipei Fubon Braves
- 2025–present: Pelita Jaya

Career highlights
- IBL All-Star (2026); NABC co-Defensive Player of the Year (2013); Consensus second-team All-American (2013); 2× Big 12 Defensive Player of the Year (2012, 2013); First-team All-Big 12 (2013)
- Stats at NBA.com
- Stats at Basketball Reference

Jeffree David Withey (born March 7, 1990) is an American professional basketball player for the Pelita Jaya Jakarta of the Indonesian Basketball League (IBL). He played college basketball for the University of Kansas where he became known for his shot-blocking ability and his defensive presence. He was drafted 39th overall in the 2013 NBA draft by the Portland Trail Blazers.

== High school career ==
Withey led Horizon High School to the state Division IV title in his sophomore season (2006) and he graduated in the class of 2008. In the game preceding the state championship game, Withey and his teammates had to face a San Joaquin Memorial High School team in the Southern California Regional Championship game that featured three seniors who were future NBA players, Robin & Brook Lopez and Quincy Pondexter. In a dramatic double-overtime game, Withey and his teammates overcame the San Joaquin squad and went on to win the title in the following game.

In his senior season he averaged 20.8 points, 13.0 rebounds, and 7.3 blocked shots per game.

Considered a four-star recruit by Rivals.com, Withey was listed as the No. 8 center and the No. 36 player in the nation in 2008.

== College career ==
=== Arizona (2008) ===
Withey had originally committed to play for Louisville, but switched his commitment to Arizona. Following the resignation of Lute Olson in October of Withey's freshman season, he decided to transfer from Arizona. He did not see any playing time for the Wildcats during his semester of the 2008–09 season.

=== Kansas (2009–2013) ===
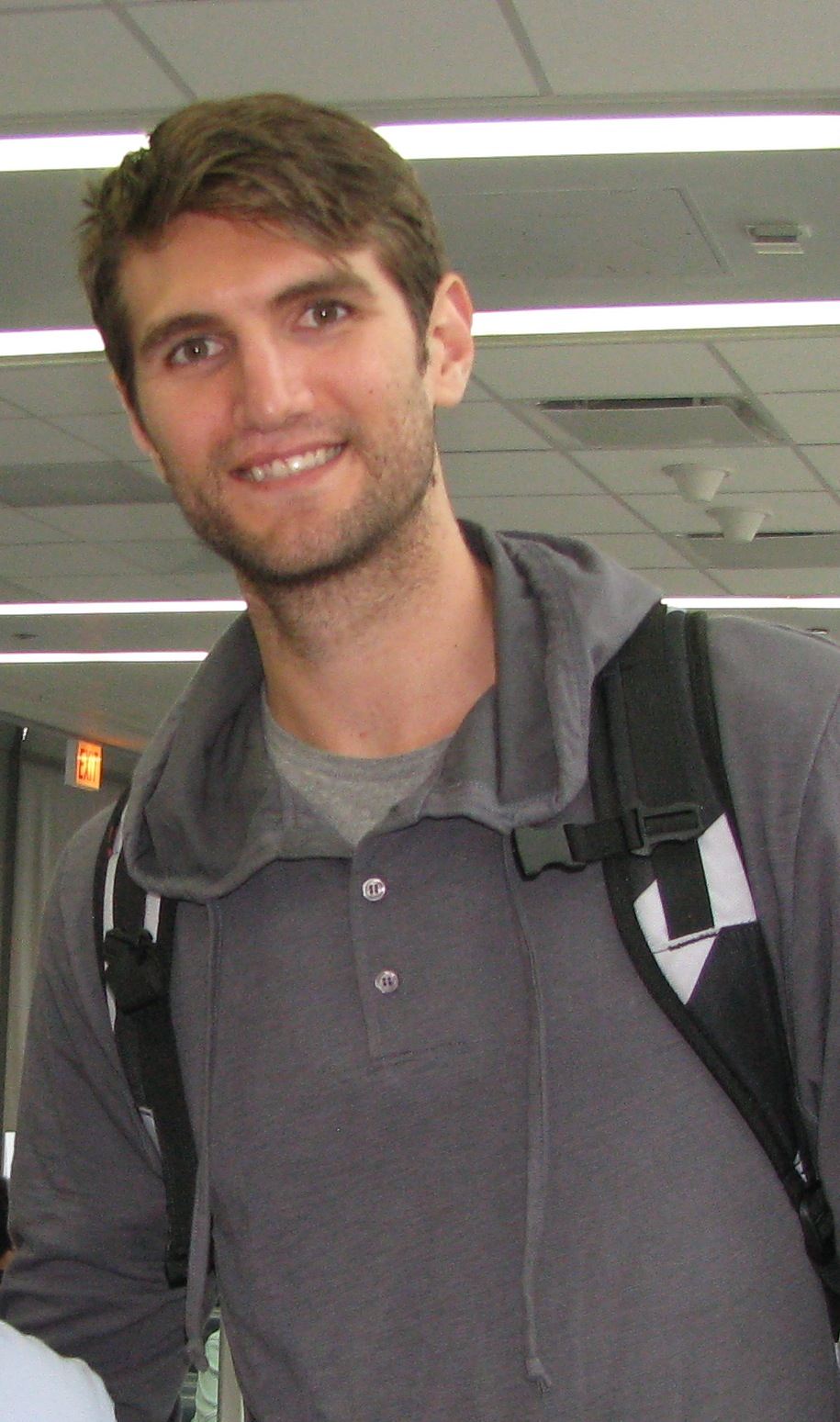
Jeff Withey in June 2013

Withey transferred to Kansas in January 2009, but was ineligible to play until the end of the 2009 fall semester due to the NCAA transfer rules requiring him to sit out a year. He initially saw limited playing time during the second half of the 2009–10 season and the 2010–11 season, playing behind Cole Aldrich and the Morris twins.

In his junior year, after twin brothers Marcus and Markieff Morris left for the NBA draft, he became a starter, playing for the 2011–12 squad which lost to Kentucky in the NCAA championship game. Withey blocked 31 shots in the 2012 tournament, breaking Joakim Noah's tournament record of 29. During the 2011–12 season, he was named Big 12 defensive player of the year and set a Big 12 record with 140 blocks for the season.

==== 2012–13 season ====
On October 4, 2012, Withey was named to the Preseason all-Big 12 unanimously.

On December 3, 2012, Withey was named Big 12 Player of the Week. To earn the honor, he scored a triple-double against San Jose State Spartans on November 26. In that game, Withey scored 16 points, grabbed 12 rebounds, and blocked 12 shots, for the second triple-double in KU history. On February 18, 2013, Withey was named Big 12 Co-Player of the Week. He had double-doubles against both Kansas State Wildcats and Texas Longhorns. He also made his 265th blocked shot to set a new Big 12 record for career blocked shots.

Withey finished his senior year of college by averaging 13.7 points, 8.5 rebounds and 3.9 blocks.

On March 10, 2013, he was named defensive player of the year in the Big 12 for 2012–13 and he was named first team All Big 12. On March 11, 2013, Withey was named 2nd Team All-American by The Sporting News. On March 31, 2013, Withey was accorded third-team All-American mention by the Associated Press.

On April 5, 2013, the National Association of Basketball Coaches named Withey the co-National Defensive Player of the Year.

=== College statistics ===
Year	Team	GP	GS	MPG	FG%	3P%	FT%	RPG	APG	SPG	BPG	PPG
2009–10	Kansas	15		3.0	.538		.556	1.4	0	.1	.4	1.3
2010–11	Kansas	26		6.2	.647		.515	1.8	.2	.2	.7	2.3
2011–12	Kansas	39	39	24.8	.536		.795	6.3	0.7	0.6	3.6	9.0
2012–13	Kansas	37	37	30.9	.582	1.000	.714	8.5	0.9	0.8	3.9	13.7

== Professional career ==
=== New Orleans Pelicans (2013–2015) ===
Withey was selected with the 39th overall pick in the 2013 NBA draft by the Portland Trail Blazers. He was traded to the New Orleans Pelicans in a three-team trade involving the Trail Blazers and the Sacramento Kings on July 10, 2013. In two seasons for the Pelicans, he averaged 3.0 points and 2.3 rebounds in 95 games.

=== Utah Jazz (2015–2017) ===
On August 24, 2015, Withey signed with the Utah Jazz. On December 28, 2015, he recorded a season-high 11 points and a career-high 12 rebounds as a starter in a 95–91 win over the Philadelphia 76ers.

=== Dallas Mavericks (2017) ===
On August 21, 2017, Withey signed a one-year deal with the Dallas Mavericks. He was waived on December 19, 2017.

=== Tofaş (2018) ===
On July 24, 2018, Withey signed with the Turkish team Tofaş for the 2018–19 season. On December 28, 2018, Withey parted ways with Tofaş after appearing in 19 games.

=== Lavrio (2019) ===
On February 28, 2019, Withey signed with Greek team Lavrio for the rest of the season. On March 30, 2019, Withey recorded a season-high 18 points, shooting 8-of-10 from the field, along with six rebounds and two blocks in an 88–99 loss to PAOK. In 10 games played for Lavrio, he averaged 6.9 points, 3.8 rebounds and 1.5 blocks per game.

On July 4, 2019, Withey joined the Washington Wizards for the 2019 NBA Summer League.

=== Ironi Nes Ziona (2019–2020) ===
On August 18, 2019, Withey signed a one-year deal with Ironi Nes Ziona of the Israeli Premier League. On October 23, 2019, Withey recorded a double-double of 23 points and 11 rebounds, leading Nes Ziona to an 82–75 win over the Kapfenberg Bulls. He was subsequently named Europe Cup round 1 Top Performer. On December 5, 2019, Withey was named Israeli League Player of the Month after averaging a double-double of 16.3 points and 13.3 rebounds, while shooting 66 percent from the field in eight games played in November. On December 23, 2019, Withey recorded a new career-high 24 points, while shooting 10-of-12 from the field, along with seven rebounds and three steals in a 95–80 win over Hapoel Tel Aviv.

=== Goyang Orion Orions (2020–2021) ===
On July 8, 2020, Withey signed with the Goyang Orion Orions of the Korean Basketball League. On February 3, 2021, he was replaced by Devin Williams. He averaged 8.8 points and 7.3 rebounds per game in the Korean Basketball League.

=== Bilbao Basket (2021–2023) ===
On July 21, 2021, Withey signed with Bilbao Basket of the Liga ACB.

On August 22, 2023, he signed with Hapoel Tel Aviv of the Israeli Premier League. However, he never played for the team.

=== Wonju DB Promy (2023–2024) ===
On October 29, 2023, Withey signed with the Wonju DB Promy of the Korean Basketball League to replace Garrison Brooks.

=== Taipei Fubon Braves (2024–present) ===
On August 26, 2024, Withey signed with the Taipei Fubon Braves of the P. League+.

== NBA career statistics ==
Legend
GP	Games played	GS	Games started	MPG	Minutes per game
FG%	Field goal percentage	3P%	3-point field goal percentage	FT%	Free throw percentage
RPG	Rebounds per game	APG	Assists per game	SPG	Steals per game
BPG	Blocks per game	PPG	Points per game	**Bold**	Career high

=== Regular season ===
Year	Team	GP	GS	MPG	FG%	3P%	FT%	RPG	APG	SPG	BPG	PPG
2013–14	New Orleans	**58**	4	11.8	.535	.000	.712	2.6	**.4**	.3	.9	3.3
2014–15	New Orleans	37	0	7.0	.500	.000	.680	1.7	.3	.1	.5	2.6
2015–16	Utah	51	**10**	**12.9**	**.537**	.000	.729	**3.4**	**.4**	**.4**	**1.0**	**4.3**
2016–17	Utah	51	1	8.5	.534	.000	**.750**	2.4	.1	.3	.6	2.9
2017–18	Dallas	9	0	4.3	.375	**.200**	.500	1.1	.0	.0	.3	1.7
Career		206	15	10.1	.525	.143	.716	2.5	.3	.3	.8	3.2

=== Playoffs ===
Year	Team	GP	GS	MPG	FG%	3P%	FT%	RPG	APG	SPG	BPG	PPG
2017	Utah	3	0	6.9	.500	.000	.500	1.3	.3	.3	.3	1.7
Career		3	0	6.9	.500	.000	.500	1.3	.3	.3	.3	1.7
