= Muhammad Rizky Ari Daffa =

Indonesian basketball player

Rizky Ari Daffa
No. 13 – RANS Simba Bogor
- Position: Center / power forward
- League: IBL

Personal information
- Born: 19 July 2000 (age 26) Bandar Lampung, Indonesia
- Listed height: 194 cm (6 ft 4 in)
- Listed weight: 80 kg (176 lb)

Career information
- High school: SMA YP Unila (Bandar Lampung, Indonesia)
- College: Esa Unggul University
- Playing career: 2022–present

Career history
- 2022-2026: Bogor Hornbills/Bumi Borneo
- 2026-present: RANS Simba Bogor

Career highlights
- IBL champion (2026); IBL All-Star (2025); All-IBL Indonesian Second Team (2023)

Muhammad Rizky Ari Daffa Dewangsa (born July 19, 2000) is an Indonesian professional basketball player for the RANS Simba Bogor of the Indonesian Basketball League (IBL).

== High school career ==
At high school, Daffa won back-to-back championships, and was selected as the DBL First Team in 2017.

== National team career ==
Daffa, for the first time, was called up by the Indonesia national team on February 17, 2025, for the 2025 FIBA Asia Cup qualification against Australia and South Korea to replace injured, Vincent Kosasih.
