= Nick Hornsby =

American basketball player (born 1995)

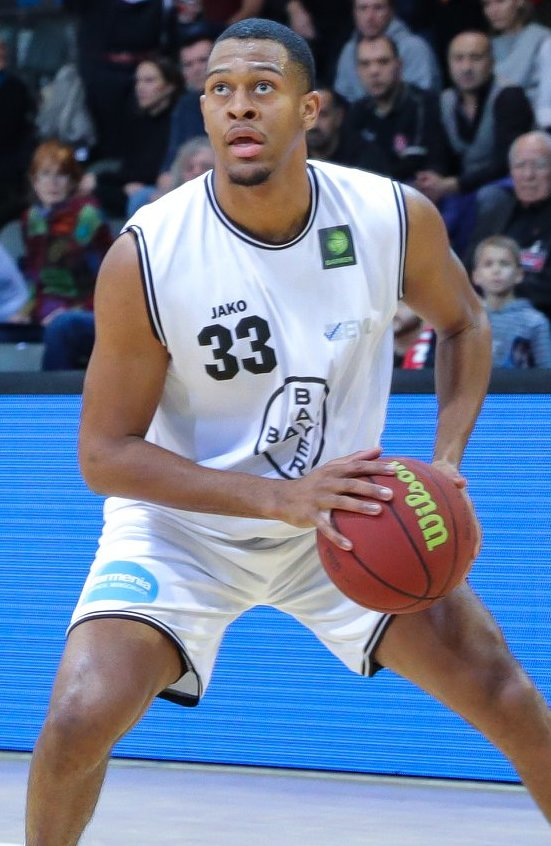
- Hornsby with Bayer Giants Leverkusen

Free agent
- Position: Power forward / small forward

Personal information
- Born: June 21, 1995 (age 31) Irvine, California, U.S.
- Listed height: 6 ft 7 in (2.01 m)
- Listed weight: 235 lb (107 kg)

Career information
- High school: Tustin (Tustin, California)
- College: Sacramento State (2013–2017)
- NBA draft: 2017: undrafted
- Playing career: 2017–present

Career history
- 2017–2018: Giessen 46ers
- 2018–2020: Bayer Giants Leverkusen
- 2020–2022: Hapoel Be'er Sheva
- 2023: Edmonton Stingers
- 2023–2024: Eisbären Bremerhaven
- 2024: Edmonton Stingers
- 2024–2025: Dorados de Chihuahua
- 2026: Hangtuah Jakarta
- 2026: Edmonton Stingers
- 2026: TNT Tropang 5G

Career highlights
- CEBL All-Second Team (2026)

Nicholas Julian Hornsby (born June 21, 1995) is an American basketball player who last played for the TNT Tropang 5G of the Philippine Basketball Association (PBA). He played college basketball for the Sacramento State Hornets.

== Early and personal life ==
Hornsby was born in Irvine, California, to Kenneth and Elizabeth Hornsby. He is 6' 7" tall (201 cm), and weighs 235 pounds (107 kg). He is married to volleyball coach Courtney (nee Dietrich) Hornsby.

== High school career ==
Hornsby played basketball as a combo guard and played volleyball for Tustin High School in Tustin, California. In basketball, he played for the Tillers. As a junior, he averaged 12.0 points, 7.8 rebounds, and 3.2 assists per game, and shot 42.0% from the field, 44.2% from the three-point line, and 80.0% from the free throw line. He was named the Empire League’s co-MVP.

As a senior, Hornsby was named team captain, and averaged 16.7 points, 8.3 rebounds and 2.7 assists per game. He was named first team all-state, co-3AAA Division Player of the Year, co-MVP of the Empire League, and first team all-county. ESPN named him the 20th-best high school recruit in California, and Scout.com ranked him the sixth-best small forward on the West Coast of the United States.

== College career ==
Hornsby attended Sacramento State University, from which he graduated with a degree in Sociology in 2017. He played basketball at the forward position for the Sacramento State Hornets.

As a freshman in 2013–14, Hornsby averaged 3.7 points, 3.3 rebounds, 1.1 assists, and 0.6 steals per game, as he shot .362 from the field and .717 from the free throw line. As a sophomore in 2014–15 he averaged 6.8 points, 5.2 rebounds, 1.6 assists, and 1.3 steals per game, as he shot .470 from the field, .400 from the 3-point line, and .639 from the free throw line.

As a junior in 2015–16, he averaged 7.8 points, 6.9 rebounds (7th in the Big Sky Conference), 1.6 assists, 1.2 steals, and 0.7 blocked shots per game. Hornsby shot.433 from the field and .662 from the free throw line. Among Big Sky players, he ranked fifth in offensive rebounds per game (2.2).

As a senior in 2016–17 Hornsby was team tri-captain, and averaged 11.3 points, 8.0 rebounds (3rd in the conference), 1.5 assists, 1.2 steals, and 0.6 blocked shots per game as he shot .504 from the field, .380 from the 3-point line, and .712 from the free throw line. Among Big Sky players, he ranked third in rebounding, second in defensive rebounding (5.9 per game), and seventh in offensive rebounding (2.2 per game). He was named Big Sky Player of the Week and Sacramento State Student-Athlete of the Week after averaging 22.5 points, 12.5 rebounds and 1.5 steals in wins at Southern Utah and Northern Arizona. He graduated ranked among the top 20 players in school history in 12 statistical categories, including 3rd in rebounds (723), and 7th in steals (133).

== Professional career ==
In September 2017, Hornsby signed with the Giessen 46ers of the German ProB (3rd division). He averaged 13.8 points, 7.5 rebounds, and 2.2 steals (5th in the division) per game. He played in 2018–20 for the Bayer Giants Leverkusen of the German ProB (averaging 12.2 points and 7.9 rebounds (10th in the division) per game) and ProA (averaging 14.2 points per game) (second) divisions.

Hornsby has played in Israel since 2020 for Hapoel Be'er Sheva of the Israeli Basketball Premier League, at the forward position. In 2020–21, he averaged 7.7 points and 4.2 rebounds per game. Hornsby re-signed with the team on July 11, 2021.

On October 8, 2024, Hornsby signed with Dorados de Chihuahua of the Liga Nacional de Baloncesto Profesional.

On January 23, 2026, Hornsby recorded a career-high 36 points to go along with 16 rebounds in a 72–79 loss over the Tangerang Hawks.
