= Kelvin Sanjaya =

Indonesian basketball player

No. 3 – Bogor Hornbills
- Position: Center / power forward
- League: IBL

Personal information
- Born: 27 November 2000 (age 25) Pekanbaru, Indonesia
- Listed height: 199 cm (6 ft 6 in)
- Listed weight: 95 kg (209 lb)

Career information
- High school: SMAN 1 (Pekanbaru, Indonesia)
- College: UPH
- Playing career: 2020–present

Career history
- 2021: Satria Muda Pertamina
- 2021-2022: →Indonesia Patriots
- 2022-2023: Satria Muda Pertamina
- 2023-2025: Prawira Bandung
- 2025: Satria Muda Bandung
- 2025-present: Bogor Hornbills

Career highlights
- IBL champion (2022, 2026); 2× IBL All-Star (2022, 2024); All-IBL Rookie Team (2021); LIMA champion (2021)

Kelvin Sanjaya (born November 27, 2000) is an Indonesian professional basketball player for the Borneo Hornbills of the Indonesian Basketball League (IBL). He played college basketball for the UPH Eagles.

== High school ==
At SMA 1 Pekanbaru he was selected as a DBL All-Star in 2017 where they sent the All-Star team to Los Angeles.

== National team career ==
Represented the Indonesia national team in the 2024 FIBA Pre-Qualifying Olympic.
