= Hendrick Xavi Yonga =

Indonesian basketball player

Hendrick Yonga
No. 21 – Pelita Jaya
- Position: Shooting guard / point guard
- League: IBL

Personal information
- Born: 7 August 2002 (age 24) Jakarta, Indonesia
- Listed height: 185 cm (6 ft 1 in)
- Listed weight: 75 kg (165 lb)

Career information
- High school: SMAN 116 (Jakarta, Indonesia)
- College: Bakrie University
- Playing career: 2021–present

Career history
- 2021-2022: Indonesia Patriots
- 2022-present: Pelita Jaya

Career highlights
- IBL champion (2024); 2× IBL All-Star (2024, 2026); IBL All Indonesian Cup champion (2024)
Medals
Men's basketball
Representing Indonesia
Southeast Asian Games
| Bronze medal – third place | 2025 Thailand | Team |

Hendrick Xavi Yonga (born August, 7 2002) commonly nicknamed Dede, is an Indonesian professional basketball player for Pelita Jaya Bakrie of the Indonesian Basketball League (IBL). Plays both guard positions, he can also play small forward.

== Personal life ==
Hendrick is the son of late Cameroonian former professional football player, Francis Yonga. While playing professionally in Indonesia, he played for Persikota Tangerang, Arema Malang, and Persijap Jepara. His mother, Jeanne Yuliana, formerly played for the Indonesia women's national basketball team.

== Professional career ==
Hendrick played a total of 15 games for the Indonesia Patriots in the 2022 IBL season, and averaged 7,1 PPG.

== National team career ==
Hendrick numerously represented the Indonesia men's national basketball team at several occasions. Such as in the 2025 FIBA Asia Cup qualification and 2024 FIBA Men's Pre-Qualifying Olympic Qualifying Tournaments that was held in Syria, and also the 2022 Asian Games that was held in Hangzhou, China, and now appearing as a debutant in his first 2025 SEA Games.
