= Rajawali Medan =

Indonesian basketball team

- 2026 IBL Indonesia
- Leagues: IBL; 2022–present
- Founded: 2022
- History: Evos Thunder Bogor (2022–2023); Rajawali Medan (2024–present)
- Arena: GOR Universitas Negeri Medan
- Location: Medan, North Sumatra
- Team colors: Red, Blue, Yellow
- Head coach: Raoul Miguel Hadinoto
Home	Away	Third

Rajawali Medan is an Indonesian professional basketball team currently playing in the Indonesian Basketball League (IBL). The team is based in the city of Medan, making them the only team in the league from the island of Sumatra.

In November 2023, the team owners acquired Evos Thunder Bogor's IBL license and renamed the franchise Rajawali Medan for the 2024 season.

== Roster ==
Rajawali Medan roster
Players
Coaches

Pos.	No.	Nat.	Name	Ht.	Wt.
SF	4	(Indonesia)	Deo Putra Conrad (R)	1.84 m (6 ft 0 in)	72 kg (159 lb)
PF	5	(United States)	Antonio Hester (I)	1.98 m (6 ft 6 in)	90 kg (198 lb)
PG	6	(Indonesia)	Alexandro Manuel	1.63 m (5 ft 4 in)	58 kg (128 lb)
SG	7	(Indonesia)	Jordan Oei	1.83 m (6 ft 0 in)	75 kg (165 lb)
SG	8	(Indonesia)	Darryl Winata	1.76 m (5 ft 9 in)	70 kg (154 lb)
SG	11	(Indonesia)	Jason Prawira	1.75 m (5 ft 9 in)
SG	12	(Indonesia)	Danny Christianto	1.81 m (5 ft 11 in)	82 kg (181 lb)
F	13	(Indonesia)	Yeremia Yeremia	1.88 m (6 ft 2 in)	91 kg (201 lb)
C	14	(South Sudan)	Majur Majak (I)	2.13 m (7 ft 0 in)	98 kg (216 lb)
F	15	(Indonesia)	David Ebenezer Frans	1.89 m (6 ft 2 in)	65 kg (143 lb)
C	17	(Indonesia)	Leonardo Effendy	1.95 m (6 ft 5 in)	87 kg (192 lb)
PG	20	(Indonesia)	Samuel Devin Susanto	1.78 m (5 ft 10 in)	72 kg (159 lb)
F	22	(Indonesia)	Muhammad Bayu Keanu Syahputra	1.90 m (6 ft 3 in)	92 kg (203 lb)
SF	27	(Indonesia)	Edo Iman Tauhid (R)	1.91 m (6 ft 3 in)	75 kg (165 lb)
F/C	45	(Indonesia)	Julius Caesar Wongso	1.89 m (6 ft 2 in)	93 kg (205 lb)
PG	77	(Indonesia)	Gede Elgi Wimbardi	1.78 m (5 ft 10 in)	66 kg (146 lb)
SF	94	(United States)	McKenzie Moore (I)	1.98 m (6 ft 6 in)	86 kg (190 lb)

Head coach

- (Indonesia) Efri Meldi

Assistant coach(es)

- (Indonesia) Maddis Abieza
- (Indonesia) Yo Sua

Legend

- (C) Team captain
- (I) Import player
- (R) Rookie
- Injured

=== Depth chart ===
Pos.	Starting 5	Bench
C	Ater Majok	Julius Wongso
PF	Antonio Hester	Yeremia Yeremia
SF	Brandone Francis	Darryl Winata
SG	Jordan Oei	Jason Prawira
PG	Samuel Devin Susanto	Gede Elgi Wimbardi

== Notable players ==
- (United States) Quintin Dove
- (United States) Wendell Lewis
- (Indonesia) Daniel Wenas
- (Indonesia) Tri Hartanto
- (United States) Jabari Bird
- (United States) Dennis Clifford
- (Denmark) Jonas Zohore
- (Dominican Republic) Brandone Francis
- (Lebanon) Ater Majok
- (United States) Antonio Hester
- (Indonesia) Samuel Devin Susanto
- (United States) McKenzie Moore
