= Indigo Bay Lodge Airport =

- IATA: IBL; ICAO: none

Summary
- Airport type: Private
- Serves: Anantara Bazaruto Island Resort
- Elevation AMSL: 20 ft / 6 m
- Coordinates: 21°42′26″S 35°27′08″E

Map

Runways
Direction	Length		Surface
Direction	ft	m	Surface
02/34	4,390	1,338	Asphalt
- Source: Google Maps OurAirports

Indigo Bay Lodge Airport (IATA: IBL) is an airport serving the former Indigo Bay Lodge on Bazaruto Island, Mozambique. The current facility is the Anantara Bazaruto Island Resort. The private facility has an airstrip and a helipad.

== See also ==
- Transport in Mozambique
