= Bogor Hornbills =

Indonesian basketball team

- 2026 IBL Indonesia
- Leagues: IBL; 2022–present FilBasket; 2022
- Founded: January, 2022
- History: Bumi Borneo Pontianak (2022–2023); Borneo Hornbills (2023–2025); Bogor Hornbills (2025–)
- Arena: GOR Laga Tangkas Pakansari, Cibinong
- Location: Pontianak, West Kalimantan (2022–2023); Bogor, West Java (2023–)
- Team colors: Green, white, black, yellow, light green
- President: Leo Goutama
- General manager: Rivaldo Tandra
- Head coach: César Cámara Pérez
- Championships: IBL: 1 (2026)
- Website: borneohornbills.com
Home	Away

Bogor Hornbills is an Indonesian professional basketball team currently playing in the Indonesian Basketball League (IBL) based in the city of Bogor, West Java. It was formerly known as Bumi Borneo Pontianak and were playing in Pontianak for the first seasons of the club's existence before its move to Bogor after the 2023 IBL season.

== Roster ==
Bogor Hornbills roster
Players
Coaches

Pos.	No.	Nat.	Name	Ht.	Wt.
G	0	(United States)	Stephaun Branch (I)	1.93 m (6 ft 4 in)	84 kg (185 lb)
F	1	(Indonesia)	Almando Davin Nepa Bait (R)	1.93 m (6 ft 4 in)	101 kg (223 lb)
G	2	(Indonesia)	Antoni Erga	1.79 m (5 ft 10 in)	78 kg (172 lb)
C	3	(Indonesia)	Kelvin Sanjaya	1.99 m (6 ft 6 in)	95 kg (209 lb)
G	4	(Indonesia)	Oktora Raihan Andhiky (R)	1.79 m (5 ft 10 in)	70 kg (154 lb)
SF	7	(Indonesia)	Daniel Wenas	1.90 m (6 ft 3 in)	82 kg (181 lb)
G	10	(Indonesia)	Hans Abraham	1.80 m (5 ft 11 in)	73 kg (161 lb)
G	11	(Indonesia)	Calvin Chrissler	1.75 m (5 ft 9 in)	75 kg (165 lb)
PF	13	(Indonesia)	Muhammad Rizky Ari Daffa	1.94 m (6 ft 4 in)	80 kg (176 lb)
G	14	(Indonesia)	Christopher Jason Winata	1.85 m (6 ft 1 in)	83 kg (183 lb)
SF	17	(Indonesia)	David Nuban	1.86 m (6 ft 1 in)	85 kg (187 lb)
PF	25	(United States)	Travin Thibodeaux (I)	1.99 m (6 ft 6 in)	106 kg (234 lb)
G	31	(Indonesia)	Sevly Victory Rondonuwu	1.73 m (5 ft 8 in)	63 kg (139 lb)
F/C	34	(United States)	Kaleb Wesson (I/C)	2.08 m (6 ft 10 in)	113 kg (249 lb)
F	77	(Indonesia)	Muhammad Fhirdan Guntara	1.84 m (6 ft 0 in)	80 kg (176 lb)

Head coach

- (Spain) César Cámara Pérez

Assistant coach(es)

- (Jamaica) Akeem Scott
- (Indonesia) Danny Mulya Kusuma

Legend

- (C) Team captain
- (I) Import player
- (R) Rookie
- Injured

- Roster
Updated: 7 March 2025,

=== Depth chart ===
Pos.	Starting 5	Bench
C	Kaleb Wesson	Daniel Wenas
PF	Travin Thibodeaux	Muhammad Fhirdan Guntara
SF	David Nuban	Hans Abraham
SG	Stephaun Branch	Kelvin Sanjaya
PG	Antoni Erga	Sevly Rondonuwu

== Notable players ==
- Set a club record or won an individual award as a professional player
- Played at least one official international match for his senior national team at any time.
- (United States) Cameron Ridley
- (United States) Devondrick Walker
- (United States) Randy Bell
- (United States) Brandon McCoy
- (United States) Isaiah Briscoe
- (United States) Nate Grimes
- (Ukraine) Viacheslav Kravtsov
- (Indonesia) Muhammad Rizal Falconi
- (Indonesia) Tri Hartanto
- (Indonesia) Respati Ragil
