= Perrin Buford =

American basketball player

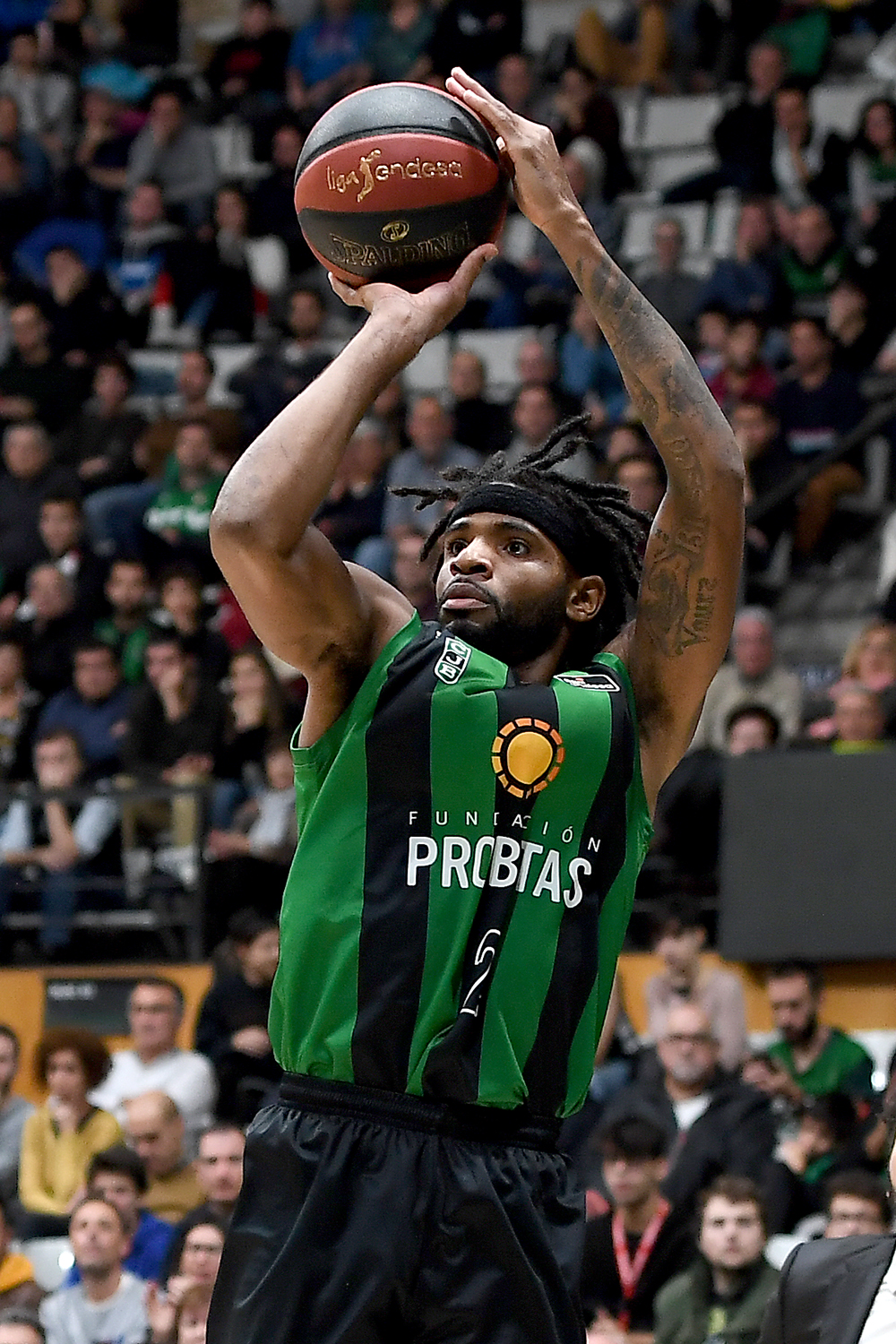
- Buford with Joventut Badalona in 2020

No. 2 – Al Riyadi
- Position: Small forward / shooting guard
- League: Lebanese Basketball League

Personal information
- Born: January 25, 1994 (age 32) Decatur, Alabama, U.S.
- Listed height: 6 ft 6 in (1.98 m)
- Listed weight: 220 lb (100 kg)

Career information
- High school: Austin (Decatur, Alabama); Hillcrest (Tuscaloosa, Alabama)
- College: Motlow State CC (2012–2013); Southwest Tennessee CC (2013–2014); Middle Tennessee (2014–2016)
- NBA draft: 2016: undrafted
- Playing career: 2016–present

Career history
- 2016–2017: Moncada Agrigento
- 2017–2018: Brisbane Bullets
- 2018: Yeşilgiresun
- 2018: Caciques de Humacao
- 2018–2019: Avtodor
- 2019–2020: Joventut
- 2020: Gaziantep Basketbol
- 2020–2024: Shimane Susanoo Magic
- 2024–2025: Shinshu Brave Warriors
- 2025–present: Al Riyadi
- 2026: Pelita Jaya

Career highlights
- B.League scoring champion (2024); VTB United League All-Star (2019)

Perrin Levon Buford (born January 25, 1994) is an American-Jordanian professional basketball player for Al Riyadi of the Lebanese Basketball League (LBL). He played college basketball at Middle Tennessee.

== Early life and high school ==
Buford was born and raised in Decatur, Alabama and started high school Austin High School before moving to Tuscaloosa and finishing at Hillcrest High School. As a senior, Buford was named second team All-State by the Alabama Sports Writers Association.

== College career ==
=== Motlow State and Southwest Tennessee ===
Buford began his college career at Motlow State Community College, where he averaged 10.7 points, 5.5 rebounds and 2.6 assists per game for the Bucks as a freshman. He then transferred to Southwest Tennessee Community College to continue playing under Jerry Nichols, who had previously been Motlow State's coach. As a sophomore, Buford averaged 14 points and six rebounds in 26 games for the Saluqis.

=== Middle Tennessee ===
Buford played his final two seasons for Middle Tennessee. He averaged eight points and 3.5 rebounds per game in his first season with the team. As a senior, Buford averaged 12 points and 5.9 rebounds per game as the Blue Raiders went on to win the 2016 Conference USA tournament and advance to the second round of the 2016 NCAA tournament after upsetting 2nd-seeded Michigan State.

== Professional career ==
=== Moncada Agrigento ===
Buford signed with Moncada Agrigento of Italy's Serie A2 Basket on July 30, 2016. In his first professional season, Buford averaged 16.8 points, 7.7 rebounds, 1.6 assists, 1.2 steals and 1.0 blocks over 33 games. After the season, Buford was named to the Boston Celtics Summer League roster but was not offered a contract with the team.

=== Brisbane Bullets ===
Buford signed with the Brisbane Bullets of Australia's National Basketball League (NBL) on August 2, 2017. After the Bullets were eliminated from playoff contention, Buford was released by the Bullets on February 5, 2018, at his own request to pursue opportunities playing in Europe, although general manager Richard Clarke publicly commented that he was let go due to his lack of commitment to the team. Buford averaged 16.2 points, 8.1 rebounds, and 2.3 assists over NBL 22 games.

=== Yeşilgiresun ===
After his release, Buford signed with Yeşilgiresun Belediye of the Turkish Basketball Super League (BSL) on February 19, 2018, for the rest of the team's season. He averaged 10.0 points, 7.2 rebounds, 2.4 assists and 1.1 blocks in 12 BSL games.

=== Caciques de Humacao ===
Following the end of the BSL season, Buford signed with Caciques de Humacao of Puerto Rico's Baloncesto Superior Nacional (BSN). He played in the team's final six games of the season and averaged 10.0 points, 6.7 rebounds and 3.5 assists as the Caciques finished in last place in the BSN.

=== Avtodor Saratov ===
Buford signed with Avtodor Saratov of the VTB United League on August 3, 2018. Buford was named to the "World" team in the 2019 VTB United League All-Star Game. He was named Player of the Round for the last round of the VTB Season after scoring 29 points and grabbing 10 rebounds against BC Enisey. He finished the season with 16.6 points (5th-best in the VTB) and 6.8 rebounds (7th) per game in 26 games as Avtodor finished 11th in the VTB standings. He also averaged 16.2 points, 7.9 rebounds, 4.0 assists and 1.7 blocks in 12 FIBA Europe Cup games.

=== Fujian ===
Buford signed with the Fujian Sturgeons of the Chinese Basketball Association (CBA) on September 14, 2019. Buford left the Sturgeons before the start of the CBA season.

=== Joventut ===
Buford signed with Club Joventut Badalona of the Spanish Liga ACB on November 1, 2019, after leaving Fujian. Buford averaged 5.4 points, 2.7 rebounds and 1.2 steals in 11 Liga ACB games and 6.6 points, 3.1 rebounds and 1.1 assists in eight EuroCup games before leaving the team.

=== Gaziantep Basketbol ===
On February 7, 2020, he has signed with Gaziantep Basketbol of the Turkish Basketball Super League (BSL).

=== Shimane Susanoo Magic ===
On July 13, 2020, he has signed with Shimane Susanoo Magic of the B.League.

Al Riyadi Beirut

On September 7 2025, Buford has joined Al Riyadi Club Beirut of the Lebanese Basketball League.
