= Randy Bell =

- Born: Thornton, Colorado
- Occupation: Musician
- Years active: 1982–1984
- Musical career
- Genres: New wave
- Label: Epic Records

Randy Bell (born 1960) is an American musician who was signed to Epic Records. He released the single "Don't Do Me" which made it to number 90 on the Billboard Hot 100.
