= Regina Pacis School =

Regina Pacis School (RP or Recis) is the name of three Catholic basic education institutions in Indonesia. These schools are located in Jakarta, Bogor and Surakarta, and are named Regina Pacis Jakarta, Regina Pacis Bogor and Regina Pacis Surakarta. The name "Regina Pacis" is Latin which means Queen of Peace, referring to the Blessed Virgin Mary. The educational levels include kindergarten, primary school (grades 1–6), junior high school (grades 7–9), and senior high school (grades 10–12). Regina Pacis School is managed by the Regina Pacis Foundation under the Franciscan Missionaries of Mary (FMM) Congregation. Its motto is Ad Veritatem Per Caritatem meaning "Seeking Truth Through Charity".

== Regina Pacis Jakarta ==
REGINA PACIS JAKARTA
| Address: | Jl. Palmerah Utara No.1, West Jakarta, Jakarta |
| Country: | Republic of Indonesia |
| Website: | http://reginapacis-jkt.sch.id/ |

Regina Pacis Jakarta is located in Jl. Palmerah Utara No.1, West Jakarta, Jakarta

== Regina Pacis Bogor ==
Regina Pacis Bogor was founded in July 1955 and is managed by the Regina Pacis FMM Foundation.

The school faces the Bogor Presidential Palace and Bogor Botanical Gardens. The school is located near most governmental and historical buildings of Bogor such as the court, the town hall, and the cathedral.

=== History ===
Construction of the school began on 1 August 1948 by Sr. Goede Herder, FMM, and gave education from kindergarten to JHS. In 1955, Regina Pacis Bogor opened a senior high school program. At that time, the JHS and SHS only received the girls until July 1957 (for JHS) and 1962 (for SHS).

=== Facilities and teaching ===
Regina Pacis Bogor
| Address: | Jl. Ir. H. Juanda No.2, Bogor, West Java |
| Country: | Republic of Indonesia |
| Website: | http://reginapacis.sch.id/web/ |

Regina Pacis Bogor school facilities include classrooms, two libraries, Physics Laboratory (JHS and SHS), Chemistry Laboratory (SHS), Biology Laboratory (JHS and SHS), Electrical Laboratory (SHS), and Computer laboratory (Elementary, JHS, and SHS). The school also has a hall, audiovisual room, basketball field, art room, and cafeteria.

== Regina Pacis Surakarta ==
Regina Pacis Surakarta
| Address: | Jl. Adi Sucipto No.45, Kerten, Kec. Laweyan, Kota Surakarta, Jawa Tengah 57143 |
| Country: | Republic of Indonesia |
| Website: | http://smareginapacis-solo.sch.id |

Regina Pacis Surakarta is located in Jl. Adi Sucipto No. 45, Surakarta, Jawa Tengah, Indonesia.
