= Tangerang Hawks =

Indonesian basketball team

- 2026 IBL Indonesia
- Leagues: IBL; 2022–2026
- Founded: 2022
- Dissolved: 2026
- Arena: Indomilk Indoor Arena
- Capacity: 2,000
- Location: South Tangerang, Banten
- Team colors: Purple, White, Yellow
- President: Iskandarsyah Rama Datau
- General manager: Indra Budianto
- Head coach: Antonius Joko Endratmo
- Affiliation: Persita Tangerang
- Championships: 0
Home	Away

Tangerang Hawks Basketball Club is an Indonesian professional basketball team playing in the Indonesian Basketball League (IBL). The team is based in the city of Tangerang.

Tangerang Hawks is also under the ownership of Super League club Persita Tangerang and PT Pusaka Tugu Adiwangsa.

== History ==
The Tangerang Hawks Basketball Club was established in 2013, focusing on developing basketball talent in the Tangerang region. In 2022, the team joined the Indonesian Basketball League (IBL) as part of the league's expansion. The club is owned by PT Pusaka Tugu Adiwangsa, with stakeholders including PT Persita Tangerang Raya, a professional football club from Tangerang Regency, and individuals such as Iskandarsyah R. Datau and Ahmed Zulfikar I.A.

== Roster ==
Note: Flags indicate national team eligibility at FIBA-sanctioned events. Players may hold other non-FIBA nationalities not displayed.

Tangerang Hawks roster
Players
Coaches

Pos.	No.	Nat.	Name	Ht.
G	1	(Indonesia)	Yesaya Saudale	1.78 m (5 ft 10 in)
SG	2	(Indonesia)	Sulthan Fauzan	1.87 m (6 ft 2 in)
SF	3	(Indonesia)	Gabriel Batistuta Risky	1.88 m (6 ft 2 in)
SF	6	(Haiti)	Jeantal Cylla (I)	1.99 m (6 ft 6 in)
PG	7	(Indonesia)	Winston Swenjaya	1.75 m (5 ft 9 in)
SG	8	(Indonesia)	Ida Bagus Ananta Wisnu Putra	1.83 m (6 ft 0 in)
PF	9	(Indonesia)	Aymane Garudi Arip	1.94 m (6 ft 4 in)
PG	12	(Indonesia)	Justin Jaya Wiyanto	1.88 m (6 ft 2 in)
PF	18	(Indonesia)	A.A. Gede Bagus Paramesvara	1.94 m (6 ft 4 in)
SG	20	(Indonesia)	Syadzili Aufa (R)	1.86 m (6 ft 1 in)
C	21	(Indonesia)	Yosua Otto Judaprajitna	1.95 m (6 ft 5 in)
C	24	(Indonesia)	I Nyoman Bagus Daneswara (R)	2.03 m (6 ft 8 in)
F	27	(Indonesia)	Keefe Fitrano Yoshe	1.90 m (6 ft 3 in)
PF	32	(United States)	Darnell Cowart (I)	1.99 m (6 ft 6 in)
C	45	(United States)	William Javonta Brown (I)	2.10 m (6 ft 11 in)

Head coach

- (Indonesia) Antonius Joko Endratmo

Assistant coach(es)

- (Indonesia) Oleh Halim

Legend

- (C) Team captain
- (I) Import player
- (R) Rookie
- Injured

- Roster
Updated: 16 March 2025,

=== Depth chart ===
Pos.	Starting 5	Bench
C	João Vitor França	Aymane Garudi Arip
PF	Josh Cunningham	A.A. Gede Paramesvara
SF	Jeantal Cylla	Keefe Yoshe
SG	Sulthan Fauzan	Gabriel Risky Batistuta
PG	Yesaya Saudale	Winston Swenjaya

== Notable players ==
To appear in this section a player must have either:

- Set a club record or won an individual award as a professional player.
- Played at least one official international match for his senior national team at any time.
- Played at least one official regular season game in the NBA.

- (Indonesia) Yesaya Saudale
- (United States) Jarred Shaw
- (Indonesia) Teddy Apriyana Romadonsyah
- (Serbia) Nemanja Bešović
- (Brazil) João Vitor França
- (Indonesia) (Philippines) Ebrahim Enguio
- (United States) Xavier Alexander
- (United States) Richard Ross
- (Indonesia) Mario Gerungan
