= Campus League Season 2026 basketball tournaments =

Basketball season

The Campus League Season 2026 basketball tournaments were the Campus League basketball tournaments for its inaugural season. Hosted by Pelita Harapan University, the season ended with the Perbanas Rhinos winning the mens' tournament and University of Surabaya winning the womens'. The teams will represent Indonesia in the Asian University Basketball League in 2027.

== Nationals roster (Men) ==
Source: Campus League Roster

=== Satya Wacana Christian ===
Pos	Name	From	Height	Age
F	Mochammad Nabizar Attila Taqwa	Pemalang	189 cm	22
G	Hosea Fernando Salomo	Surakarta	185 cm	20
G	Ricky Setiawan Tanadi	Mataram	172 cm	18
G	Steve Willie Saputra	Purwokerto	187 cm	22
G	Irsyad Maulana	Garut	175 cm	22
F	Anggita Reksi Pala	Probolinggo	190 cm	22
G	Jonathan Christopher Joris	Jakarta	186 cm	21
C	Muhammad Fatih Ramadhan	Pekanbaru	197 cm	19
C	Samuel Kafiar	Sorong	187 cm	20
F	Gerald Haikal Nababan	Sangatta	190 cm	20
G	Abraham Adolof Awarawi	Waena	173 cm	21
F	Fakhri Nazmi Azhari	Padang	193 cm	23
G	Brooklyn Raffael Tristan	Surabaya	178 cm	22

=== ITHB ===
Pos	Name	From	Height	Age
G	Zufar Alphanova	Cimahi	180 cm	20
G	Vaico Arthasa Milga Yudayana	Bandung	180 cm	19
G	Raden Muhammad Raisha Ramadhan Ma'mur	Jakarta	185 cm	22
F	Nathaniel William Saragih	Tasikmalaya	190 cm	22
G	Nafis Irsyad Fahmi	Bandung	173 cm	19
F	Jordy Maximilian	Jakarta	187 cm	21
G	I Gusti Ngurah Dharmawangsa	Bandar Lampung	180 cm	21
F	Darrel Akhdan Tiara	Bandung	185 cm	19
G	Athamaliq Muafa Yudhiputra	Bandung	179 cm	20
G	Al Gibran Moreno Mohamad	Bandung	171 cm	19
G	Al Akbar Arsy Melandri	Tangerang	185 cm	19
F	Abyan Abisali	Bandung	181 cm	19

=== Bina Nusantara ===
Pos	Name	From	Height	Age
SF	Kenas Lebtinneo	Sidoarjo	183 cm	19
SG	Pimpin Jaya	Jambi	183 cm	20
PF	Agil Hiskia Putra Hanayudha	Jakarta	186 cm	20
SF	Aurell Rizqi Atthalla	Jakarta	183 cm	21
SG	Marvin Manuel Utomo	Jakarta	180 cm	21
PF	Muhammad Fauzan Billah	Jayapura	188 cm	21
PG	Muhammad Reza Aditya Heri	Makassar	179 cm	22
PF	I Made Rayxelvio Erawan Rustiadi	Bogor	183 cm	20
PF	Patrick Chandra Lingga	Bogor	186 cm	20
	Davin Abby Rafarizq	Bekasi	176 cm	19
PG	Hosea Yedija Setiawan	Jakarta	178 cm	18
PF	Fachrie Abhyasa	Indramayu	185 cm	21
PG	Marchelo Delano	Pangkal Pinang	174 cm	20
SG	Febrian Nathanael Hotasi	Jakarta	183 cm	21
SG	Aidan Alfred Midon De Smet	Denpasar	184 cm	20

=== Cenderawasih ===
Pos	Name	From	Height	Age
PF	Germanus Awey Dato Mote	Wamena	185 cm	20
PF	Willard Audre	Jayapura	174 cm	22
SF	Paulus Maurits Siahaya	Ambon	180 cm	21
SG	Marco Melandry Tanati	Jayapura	179 cm	19
PG	Julian Edaward Vassily Sarioa	Jayapura	173 cm	20
SG	Jepsen P. Y. Helakombo	Jayapura	177 cm	22
SG	Helon Rauhel Okran Pekei	Jayapura	175 cm	21
SF	Hendry Gleen Vabio Haumahu	Jayapura	179 cm	19
PF	Simson Kromsian	Jayapura	184 cm	20
SF	Mario Pasifiko Dion Konorop	Merauke	183 cm	19
PG	Chriswell Kardia Kharan Roleh	Jayapura	160 cm	21
PG	Alessandro Pariaribo	Jayapura	160 cm	19

=== Maranatha Christian ===
Pos	Name	From	Height	Age
C	Muhamad Rasya Putra Pranata	Karawang	198 cm	19
SG	Kevin Kristian Simanjuntak	Pekanbaru	173 cm	19
CG	Ivan Matthew Baliputera	Mataram	175 cm	19
SF	Ardino Argya Natareksa	Tulungagung	178 cm	20
PG	Jonathan Prasetyo Rudiyanto	Semarang	181 cm	18
PF	Jonathan Karsten Hatorangan Panggabean	Medan	190 cm	19
C	Fikran Fattah	Bandung	188 cm	22
PG	Joshua Nathanael Yangtjik	Bandung	180 cm	20
SG	Aloysius Valentino Sumana	Bekasi	184 cm	20
C/PF	Marcell Syahlevi Putera	Cirebon	199 cm	20
C	Zihad Visabililah	Sumedang	200 cm	21
PG	Aditya Wiguna Sulistiyo	Bogor	178 cm	20
C	Karel Nazwa Megantara	Bandung	189 cm	23
SG	Farrergie Alexandre Nauval	Cirebon	184 cm	21
PG	Ferry Mingtoro	Madiun	175 cm	21

=== Pelita Harapan ===
Pos	Name	From	Height	Age
G	Aaron Nathanael	Jakarta	182 cm	22
F	Andrew Hansen Siagian	Jakarta	187 cm	21
SG	Radityo Wirananto	Bantul	179 cm	22
F	Tan Evan Roos	Cimahi	185 cm	19
F	Jordy Lustino	Medan	190 cm	21
G	Muhammad Endwalijri Kuswara	Jakarta	180 cm	20
G	Bryant Citrahardja Manuputty	Bogor	183 cm	19
G	Stephen Sundinata	Tangerang	183 cm	19
G	Alexander Raphael Kusnoatmaja	Jakarta	176 cm	18
F	Claudius Teo	Bandung	184 cm	20
C	Erwin Rostam Dokht	Tehran	192 cm	19
F	I Nyoman Aldo Dharma	Denpasar	185 cm	20
G	Teuku Ahmad Devanio	Jakarta	180 cm	18
G	Matthew Benedictus Manuputty	Semarang	170 cm	20
C	Laurent Valentius Gunadi	Jakarta	200 cm	22
G	Kennie Elbert Kristanto	Surabaya	178 cm	19

=== Mulawarman ===
Pos	Name	From	Height	Age
F	Bagus Naufal Pratama	Jakarta	190 cm	22
G	Muhammad Divka Akmal Nugroho	Samarinda	176 cm	21
F	Rivaldo Januarta Manurung	Berau	179 cm	19
SF	Hanafi Anshar Maratha	Berau	176 cm	19
SF	Firko Arian Hidayat	Samarinda	178 cm	22
SF	Dominicus Padang	Muara Jawa	174 cm	20
CG	Federikco Abromovic	Samarinda	170 cm	18
PG	Reynaldo Christian Leboc	Balikpapan	171 cm	19
SF	Roitsabiq Dwi Pangga	Balikpapan	177 cm	23
SF	Billy Steven Naibaho	Sangatta	176 cm	21
C	Tantowi Yusuf	Samarinda	190 cm	20
SF	Fabio Cannavaro Sinaga	Berau	184 cm	19
F	Ivan Arsenius Sianipar	Balikpapan	180 cm	20
G	Matthew Benedictus Manuputty	Semarang	170 cm	20
C	Filemon Youventis Masi	Samarinda	183 cm	22
SG	Dimas Dwi Andika Putera	Samarinda	174 cm	22

=== Surabaya ===
Pos	Name	From	Height	Age
PG	Anthonio Andreas Randalembang	Makassar	171 cm	18
SG	Axel Jevan Whyte	Kediri	175 cm	20
SG	Jansen Cahyadi	Probolinggo	182 cm	19
SF	Felix Fie Navarine	Malang	180 cm	20
SF	Steven Arya Giovanni	Surabaya	180 cm	20
PF	Johanson Ronald Simbolon	Denpasar	181 cm	20
PG	I Gusti Bagus Hariraja Kinandhana	Denpasar	177 cm	18
SG	Dylan Wilbert Pranoto	Semarang	185 cm	19
SG	Geoffrey Grant Gavindra	Surabaya	176 cm	22
SF	Macxquel Rehan Thiemailattu	Ambon	184 cm	19
SG	Revan Surya Winatha	Denpasar	180 cm	19
PF	Benjamin Archie Prasada	Melbourne	185 cm	19
PG	Johan Son Prasetyo	Madiun	180 cm	19
PG	Haviere Noah Richel Kester	Sukoharjo	178 cm	18
PG	Petra Karunia Mariw K. Sinulingga	Lubul Linggau	176 cm	21

=== Semarang ===
Pos	Name	From	Height	Age
G	I First Son Frizzel Rafael Boseke	Jakarta	169 cm	21
F	Deng Kuot Deng	South Sudan	198 cm	20
F	Yesaya Eleazar Ongko	Surabaya	181 cm	19
G	Andi Dava Ihfazilla	Sengkang	177 cm	19
F	Muhamad Saleh Ibrahimovich Mangolo	Ternate	182 cm	18
G	Aldi Febriyanto	Cirebon	182 cm	21
G	Cakra Sukma Maulana	Bandar Lampung	163 cm	19
G	Muhammad Rendy Saputra Arafat	Banjarmasin	175 cm	20
G	Dicky Dwi Firmansyah	Cirebon	174 cm	20
F	Timothy John Francis	Sragen	186 cm	21
F	Andris Mulawan	Pekanbaru	182 cm	22
PF	Agung Satrio Prabowo Putra Susanto	Semarang	178 cm	22
G	Mohammad Harry Reformasi	Limboto	175 cm	22

== Champions of each region ==
2025-26 Champions (Men)
Region	University
Surabaya	University of Surabaya
Yogyakarta	Satya Wacana Christian University
Kalimantan	Mulawarman University
Bandung	Maranatha Christian University
Jakarta	Pelita Harapan University

2025-26 Champions (Women)
Region	University
Surabaya	University of Surabaya
Yogyakarta	Soegijapranata Catholic University
Bandung	Maranatha Christian University
Jakarta	Bina Nusantara University
