= Daniel Salamena =

Indonesian basketball player

No. 24 – RANS Simba Bogor
- Position: Shooting guard
- League: IBL

Personal information
- Born: April 27, 2003 (age 23) Malang, Indonesia
- Listed height: 188 cm (6 ft 2 in)
- Listed weight: 83 kg (183 lb)

Career information
- High school: SMAN 10 (Malang, Indonesia)
- College: Perbanas Institute
- Playing career: 2021–present

Career history
- 2021-2023: Indonesia Patriots
- 2023: Bima Perkasa Jogja
- 2023-present: RANS Simba Bogor

Career highlights
- 2× IBL All-Star (2025, 2026)

Daniel William Tunasey Salamena (born April 27, 2003) is an Indonesian professional basketball player for the RANS Simba Bogor of the Indonesian Basketball League (IBL).

== College career ==
Played for the Perbanas Rhinos, represented them during their 2023 World University Basketball Series (WUBS) campaign that was held in Shibuya, Tokyo.

== Professional career ==
=== 2021-22 ===
He joined Indonesia Patriots for the 2021–22 season. In 12 matches, Daniel averaged 3 PPG and 1,5 RPG. He then got drafted in the IBL Draft 2022, Daniel was signed as a rookie by Bima Perkasa Jogja. However, he never played for Bima Perkasa in the 2023 regular season.

=== 2022-23 ===
Throughout the 2023 regular season, Daniel returned to play for the Patriots, under the guidance of Miloš Pejić. Daniel played in 29 games, averaging 6,1 points per game, 2,9 RPG, and 1,2 APG. He played 22,2 minutes per game and was often a starter. However, Daniel returned to Bima Perkasa in the playoffs. In two games against Pelita Jaya, Daniel scored 1 PPG and 2,5 RPG. Bima Perkasa then was swept by Pelita Jaya in the first round (0–2).

=== 2024-25 ===
RANS Simba Bogor coach, Anthony Garbelotto praised Daniel to the highest degree. The Englishman described Daniel as a player who always works hard. Daniel was the hero of RANS Simba Bogor's victory against Hangtuah Jakarta in week seven of the 2025 IBL season on March 7th, 2025. Daniel's three-pointer in the final minutes of the fourth quarter led RANS Simba Bogor to an 86–85 victory over the home team. Daniel's success in executing the three-pointer didn't surprise Anthony. He believes Daniel can do it whenever needed. "When I was entrusted to coach RANS, I had some doubts. However, I saw Daniel as a player who always works hard in practice," said Anthony. "Daniel never complains and always does his job well. So what happened in this match is the fruit of that hard work," added the former Bali United Basketball coach. The victory over Hangtuah Jakarta placed RANS Simba Bogor in second place in the 2025 IBL standings. Surliyadin and his teammates won. earned 18 points from eight wins and two losses.

== National team career ==
Daniel, for the first time, represented Indonesia in the 2025 FIBA Asia Cup qualification. Throughout the qualification, he only managed to play one game.
