= Anto Boyratan =

Indonesian basketball player

No. 22 – Pelita Jaya
- Position: Power forward / center
- League: IBL

Personal information
- Born: 10 February 2002 (age 24) Makassar, Indonesia
- Listed height: 196 cm (6 ft 5 in)
- Listed weight: 90 kg (198 lb)

Career information
- College: Perbanas Institute
- Playing career: 2022–present

Career history
- 2022-2023: West Bandits Solo
- 2023-present: Pelita Jaya
- 2025: Dandenong Rangers

Career highlights
- IBL champion (2024); IBL All Indonesian Cup champion (2024)
Medals
Men's 3x3 basketball
Representing Indonesia
ASEAN University Games
Bronze medal – third place	2024 Surabaya-Malang	Team 3x3

Anto Febrianto Boyratan (born February 10, 2002) is an Indonesian professional basketball player for Pelita Jaya of the Indonesian Basketball League (IBL). Formerly played for Dandenong Rangers, he became the first ever Indonesian to play in the Australian NBL1.

== College career ==
Played for the Perbanas Rhinos Men's Basketball representing Perbanas Institute. He won the LIMA National Championship in 2023.

== Professional career ==
=== West Bandits Solo (2021-2023) ===
West Bandits Solo signs Anto as they picked him the 2022 IBL Draft as a rookie, he played 7 games for them in his debut season with just averaging 3,7 minutes per game. But on the 2023 season Anto improved as he played 25 games and had 5,1 PPG and 3 RPG.

=== Pelita Jaya (2023-present) ===
On the 31st of October 2023, Pelita Jaya signs Anto alongside his teammate Nickson Gosal.

After winning the championship in the 2024 season, Anto alongside Hendrick, undergo a four-month training camp in Las Vegas, Nevada with the well-known IMPACT Basketball.

=== Dandenong Rangers (2025) ===
Just after he finished his 4-month training camp in the United States, on February 25, 2025, Anto made history as the first Indonesian to sign to an Australian NBL1 side Dandenong Rangers. On April 24, 2025, Anto made his debut against Frankston Blues making 1 rebound and 1 assist in 3 minutes played.
