= Govinda Julian Saputra =

Indonesian basketball player

Personal information
- Born: 13 July 1996 (age 30) Rembang, Indonesia
- Listed height: 1.94 m (6 ft 4 in)
- Listed weight: 196 lb (89 kg)

Career information
- High school: SMAN 3 (Rembang, Indonesia); SMAN 14 (Semarang, Indonesia)
- College: Perbanas Institute
- Playing career: 2017–2026
- Position: Power forward / small forward
- Number: 20

Career history
- 2017–2023: Pelita Jaya
- 2023-2026: Amartha Hangtuah

Career highlights
- IBL Indonesia Cup champion (2022); All-IBL Indonesian Second Team (2020)

Govinda "Govin" Julian Saputra (born 13 July 1996) is an Indonesian former professional basketball player who last played for Hangtuah Jakarta of the Indonesian Basketball League (IBL). He plays both forward positions.

== Personal life ==
Govinda Julian Saputra graduated from Perbanas Institute in South Jakarta.

== Playing career ==
=== Pelita Jaya (2017-2023) ===
Govinda has been with Pelita Jaya since 2017 and left in 2023.

=== Amartha Hangtuah (2023-present) ===
On November 17, 2023, Govinda signs with the Amartha Hangtuah for the 2024 season.

== National team ==
Govinda Julian Saputra made his debut in the Indonesian basketball national team at the 2021 FIBA Asia Cup qualification under head coach Rajko Toroman.

His invitation came thanks to his strong performances in the 2020 IBL Indonesia.

His debut game was against Thailand at the Khalifa Sports City Stadium, in Manama, Bahrain, at the end of November 2020. In 10 minutes playing time, he contributed 5 points to his home country's 90–76 victory.

== Career statistics ==
=== IBL ===
==== Regular season ====
| Years | Teams | GP | Min | FG% | 3P% | FT% | APG | RPG | SPG | BPG | PPG |
|---|---|---|---|---|---|---|---|---|---|---|---|
| 2017-18 | Pelita Jaya | 12 | 5.6 | 43.4 | 25.0 | 0.0 | 0.5 | 1.6 | 0.0 | 0.0 | 1.8 |
| 2018-19 | Pelita Jaya | 17 | 10.1 | 39.6 | 28.1 | 85.3 | 0.4 | 2.5 | 0.2 | 0.2 | 3.6 |
| 2019-20 | Pelita Jaya | 10 | 19.1 | 34.8 | 34.0 | 100.0 | 1.4 | 3.7 | 1.0 | 0.1 | 6.7 |
| 2020-21 | Pelita Jaya | 14 | 18.4 | 29.3 | 18.1 | 50.0 | 0.5 | 5.2 | 0.9 | 0.4 | 4.7 |
| 2021-22 | Pelita Jaya | 21 | 24.5 | 34.3 | 22.7 | 48.3 | 1.0 | 5.0 | 0.6 | 0.5 | 7.5 |

==== Playoffs ====
| Years | Teams | GP | Min | FG% | 3P% | FT% | APG | RPG | SPG | BPG | PPG |
|---|---|---|---|---|---|---|---|---|---|---|---|
| 2019 | Pelita Jaya | 2 | 3.2 | 0.0 | 0.0 | 0.0 | 0.0 | 1.5 | 0.0 | 0.0 | 0.0 |
| 2021 | Pelita Jaya | 5 | 15.9 | 14.2 | 57.1 | 0.0 | 0.8 | 4.8 | 0.6 | 0.4 | 2.0 |
| 2022 | Pelita Jaya | 7 | 18.5 | 34.0 | 40.0 | 15.0 | 1.0 | 4.4 | 0.8 | 0.1 | 6.1 |
