= 2026 Asian University Basketball League =

2026 Asia-Pacific college basketball tournament

Tournament details
- Country: China
- City: Hangzhou
- Venue: Binjiang Gymnasium
- Dates: 2–11 August 2026
- Teams: 12
- Defending champions: (Chinese Taipei) National Chengchi University

Final positions
- Champions: (China) Shanghai Jiao Tong University (1st)
- Runners-up: (Chinese Taipei) National Chengchi University
- Third place: (Japan) Waseda University
- Fourth place: (China) Tsinghua University

The 2026 Asian University Basketball League was the second season of the Asian University Basketball League (AUBL). The tournament ran from 2–11 August 2026 at Binjiang Gymnasium in Hangzhou, China. The tournament featured inaugural entries from Australia and the Philippines. National Chengchi University were the defending champions. The tournament final was notably delayed by two days due to Typhoon Dolphin.

Shanghai Jiao Tong University were crowned 2026 AUBL champions after defeating defending champions National Chengchi University 72-69 in the final champonship game.

== Teams ==
Locations of 2026 AUBL participants

Team	Country / Territory	Apps.	Best result
University of Sydney	Australia	Debut	—N/a
Peking University	China	1	Seventh place (2025)
Shanghai Jiao Tong University	China	1	Eighth place (2025)
Tsinghua University	China	1	Runners-up (2025)
National Chengchi University	Chinese Taipei	1	Champions (2025)
Chinese University of Hong Kong	Hong Kong	Debut	—N/a
Hakuoh University	Japan	1	Third place (2025)
Waseda University	Japan	Debut	—N/a
National University of Mongolia	Mongolia	Debut	—N/a
University of the Philippines	Philippines	Debut	—N/a
Korea University	South Korea	Debut	—N/a
Yonsei University	South Korea	1	Fifth place (2025)

== Format ==
The twelve teams are divided into four groups of three teams each, competing in a single round-robin tournament format. The top two teams from each group will advance to the a single-elimination knockout stage to determine the season champion.

== Venue ==
(China) Hangzhou	Location of Binjiang Gymnasium in China
Binjiang Gymnasium	Location of Binjiang Gymnasium in China
Capacity: 3,900	Location of Binjiang Gymnasium in China

== Group stage ==
=== Group A ===
Pos	Team	Pld	W	L	PF	PA	PD	PCT	Qualification
1	(China) Tsinghua University	2	2	0	173	136	+37	1.000	Advance to knockout stage
2	(Japan) Waseda University	2	1	1	169	151	+18	.500	Advance to knockout stage
3	(Australia) University of Sydney	2	0	2	130	185	−55	.000	

Updated to match(es) played on 4 August 2026. Source: AUBL

2 August
19:30

Boxscore

Tsinghua University (China)	87–65	(Australia) University of Sydney
Pts: Xi 14; Rebs: Ou 9 Asts: Shi 6		Pts: Ekert 17; Rebs: Ekert 9 Asts: Salis 4

Binjiang Gymnasium, Hangzhou

3 August
17:00

Boxscore

University of Sydney (Australia)	65–98	(Japan) Waseda University
Pts: Evans 16; Rebs: Evans 14; Asts: Goehring, Weinstein 4		Pts: Matsumoto 36; Rebs: Nozu, Shimoyama 8 Asts: Shimoyama 10

Binjiang Gymnasium, Hangzhou

4 August
17:00

Boxscore

Waseda University (Japan)	71–86	(China) Tsinghua University
Pts: Matsumoto 21; Rebs: Matsumoto 7 Asts: Shimoyama 11		Pts: Yang 21; Rebs: Yang 7 Asts: Shi 9

Binjiang Gymnasium, Hangzhou

=== Group B ===
Pos	Team	Pld	W	L	PF	PA	PD	PCT	Qualification
1	(South Korea) Korea University	2	2	0	150	136	+14	1.000	Advance to knockout stage
2	University of the Philippines	2	1	1	136	133	+3	.500	Advance to knockout stage
3	(Japan) Hakuoh University	2	0	2	139	156	−17	.000	

Updated to match(es) played on 4 August 2026. Source: AUBL

2 August
11:30

Boxscore

Korea University (South Korea)	80–76	(Japan) Hakuoh University
Pts: Shim 18; Rebs: Yoo 8 Asts: Seok 9		Pts: Ogawa 22; Rebs: Sakai 11; Asts: Chinedu 5

Binjiang Gymnasium, Hangzhou

3 August
11:30

Boxscore

Hakuoh University (Japan)	63–76	University of the Philippines
Pts: Sakai 16; Rebs: Chinedu, 11; Asts: Horiuchi 5		Pts: Pre 17; Rebs: Pre 15; Asts: Remogat 6

Binjiang Gymnasium, Hangzhou

4 August
11:30

Boxscore

University of the Philippines	60–70	(South Korea) Korea University
Pts: Remogat 15; Rebs: Stevens 10; Asts: Poyos 3		Pts: Seok, Kim J.H.D. 14; Rebs: Kim J.H.D. 8 Asts: Seok 8

Binjiang Gymnasium, Hangzhou

=== Group C ===
Pos	Team	Pld	W	L	PF	PA	PD	PCT	Qualification
1	(China) Peking University	2	2	0	184	141	+43	1.000	Advance to knockout stage
2	(South Korea) Yonsei University	2	1	1	173	152	+21	.500	Advance to knockout stage
3	Chinese University of Hong Kong	2	0	2	128	192	−64	.000	

Updated to match(es) played on 4 August 2026. Source: AUBL

2 August
14:00

Boxscore

Peking University (China)	101–59	Chinese University of Hong Kong
Pts: Muheyati, Zhang B. 16; Rebs: Wang 8 Asts: Chen, Xiong 6		Pts: Han 10; Rebs: Han 9 Asts: Luo 4

Binjiang Gymnasium, Hangzhou

3 August
14:00

Boxscore

Chinese University of Hong Kong	69–91	(South Korea) Yonsei University
Pts: Han 20; Rebs: Han 14; Asts: Han 7		Pts: Gu 22; Rebs: Lee C. 7 Asts: Gu, Lee C. 6

Binjiang Gymnasium, Hangzhou

4 August
19:30

Boxcore

Yonsei University (South Korea)	82–83	(China) Peking University
Pts: Gu 17; Rebs: Choi, Jang 4 Asts: Lee C. 10		Pts: Wang Z. 23; Rebs: Wang Z. 12; Asts: Muheyati 6

Binjiang Gymnasium, Hangzhou

=== Group D ===
Pos	Team	Pld	W	L	PF	PA	PD	PCT	Qualification
1	(Chinese Taipei) National Chengchi University	2	2	0	166	122	+44	1.000	Advance to knockout stage
2	(China) Shanghai Jiao Tong University	2	1	1	132	136	−4	.500	Advance to knockout stage
3	National University of Mongolia	2	0	2	104	144	−40	.000	

Updated to match(es) played on 3 August 2026. Source: AUBL

2 August
17:00

Boxscore

Shanghai Jiao Tong University (China)	61–53	National University of Mongolia
Pts: Chen 20; Rebs: Wang 8 Asts: Chen 5		Pts: Purevkhishig 13; Rebs: Purevkhishig 10; Asts: Otgonjargal 3

Binjiang Gymnasium, Hangzhou

3 August
19:30

Boxscore

National Chengchi University (Chinese Taipei)	83–71	(China) Shanghai Jiao Tong University
Pts: Hsu 22; Rebs: Mboup 8 Asts: Hsu, Lin T. 4		Pts: Hu 20; Rebs: Hu, Wang 7 Asts: Chen 6

Binjiang Gymnasium, Hangzhou

4 August
14:00

Boxscore

National University of Mongolia	51–83	(Chinese Taipei) National Chengchi University
Pts: Tu. Batmunkh 13; Rebs: Jargalmagnai, Otgonjargal 5 Asts: Ikhbayar, Tu. Batmunkh 2		Pts: Mboup, Lin T. 15; Rebs: Mboup 12; Asts: Lin E. 5

Binjiang Gymnasium, Hangzhou

== Knockout stage ==
=== Bracket ===
Quarterfinals
A1	(China) Tsinghua	85
B2	(Philippines) UP	81
C1	(China) Peking	77
D2	(China) SJTU	79
A2	(Japan) Waseda	78
B1	(South Korea) Korea	71
C2	(South Korea) Yonsei	67
D1	(Chinese Taipei) NCCU	72

Semifinals
(China) Tsinghua	82
(China) SJTU	84
(Japan) Waseda	91
(Chinese Taipei) NCCU	102

Finals
(China) SJTU	72
(Chinese Taipei) NCCU	69
Third place
(China) Tsinghua	91
(Japan) Waseda	98

=== Quarterfinals ===
6 August
11:30

Boxscore

Yonsei University (South Korea)	67–72	(Chinese Taipei) National Chengchi University
Pts: Gu, Lee C. 14; Rebs: Lee B. 6 Asts: Lee B. 11		Pts: Wang, Mboup, Hsieh M. 11; Rebs: Mboup 12; Asts: Hsu 4

Binjiang Gymnasium, Hangzhou

6 August
14:00

Boxscore

Peking University (China)	77–79	(China) Shanghai Jiao Tong University
Pts: Wang Z. 35; Rebs: Wang Z. 8 Asts: Chen 6		Pts: Chen 29; Rebs: Hu H. 13; Asts: Chen 10

Binjiang Gymnasium, Hangzhou

6 August
17:00

Boxscore

Waseda University (Japan)	78–71	(South Korea) Korea University
Pts: Matsumoto 41; Rebs: Shimoyama 8 Asts: Shimoyama 12		Pts: Kim J.H. 25; Rebs: Yoo 11; Asts: Seok 10

Binjiang Gymnasium, Hangzhou

6 August
19:30

Boxscore

Tsinghua University (China)	85–81	University of the Philippines
Pts: Shi 26; Rebs: Xi 7 Asts: Shi 6		Pts: Remogat 19; Rebs: Pre 12; Asts: Remogat 5

Binjiang Gymnasium, Hangzhou

=== Semifinals ===
8 August
15:30

Boxscore

Tsinghua University (China)	82–84	(China) Shanghai Jiao Tong University
Pts: Shi, Zheng 13; Rebs: Xi, Xu 7 Asts: Shi 8		Pts: Yu 17; Rebs: Chen 12; Asts: Chen 10

Binjiang Gymnasium, Hangzhou

8 August
19:30

Boxscore

Waseda University (Japan)	91–102	(Chinese Taipei) National Chengchi University
Pts: Miura 27; Rebs: Nozu 7 Asts: Shimoyama 12		Pts: Hsieh Yun Da 26; Rebs: Mboup 15; Asts: Mboup, Hsu 7

Binjiang Gymnasium, Hangzhou

=== Third place game ===
11 August
15:30

Boxscore

Waseda University (Japan)	98–91	(China) Tsinghua University
Pts: Matsumoto 30; Rebs: Nozu 10; Asts: Shimoyama 17		Pts: Xi 22; Rebs: Xi, Xu 8 Asts: Ou Qiluoqiaowendu 5

Binjiang Gymnasium, Hangzhou

=== Championship ===
11 August
19:30

Boxscore

National Chengchi University (Chinese Taipei)	69–72	(China) Shanghai Jiao Tong University
Pts: Mboup 15; Rebs: Mboup 16; Asts: Lin E., Hsu 5		Pts: Chen, Yu 14; Rebs: Chen, Jian, Lin 7 Asts: Chen, Jian, Hu 5

Binjiang Gymnasium, Hangzhou

== Awards ==
=== 2026 All-AUBL Team ===
Player	Pos.	Team	Awards
(China) Chen Tiancan	PG	(China) Shanghai Jiao Tong University	AUBL 2026 Most Valuable Player
(Japan) Shin Matsumoto	SF/G	(Japan) Waseda University	
(Chinese Taipei) Hsu Te Chi	PG	(Chinese Taipei) National Chengchi University	AUBL 2026 Defensive Player of the Tournament
(China) Hu Hui	PF	(China) Shanghai Jiao Tong University	
(Senegal) Boubacar Mboup	C	(Chinese Taipei) National Chengchi University	
