= 2024 Indonesian Basketball League =

2024 IBL Tokopedia
- League: Indonesian Basketball League
- Sport: Basketball
- Duration: 13 January – 7 July 2024 (regular season); 11 July – 4 August 2024 (playoff/final); 22 September – 6 October 2024 (cup)
- Games: 26
- Teams: 14
- TV partner: IndiHome TV
- Streaming partner: Vidio (streaming)

Regular season
- Top seed: Dewa United Banten
- Season MVP: Abraham Damar Grahita (Local MVP); Kentrell Barkley (League-wide)

Cup
- Cup champions: Pelita Jaya Jakarta (3rd title)
- Cup runners-up: Satria Muda Pertamina
- Cup MVP: Brandon Jawato

Playoffs
- Champions: Pelita Jaya Jakarta (4th title)
- Runners-up: Satria Muda Pertamina
- Finals MVP: Anthony Beane

IBL Indonesia seasons
- ← 2023 2025 →

The 2024 Indonesian Basketball League (known as IBL Tokopedia for sponsorship reasons) was the ninth season of Indonesian top domestic basketball league, the Indonesian Basketball League, since the re-branding by Starting5. It was also the 21st IBL season overall since its establishment in 2003. The season began on January 13 and ended in August 2024 with two breaks, one in February due to the general election and FIBA Asia Cup qualifiers and another due to Eid al-Fitr and lebaran. All Indonesian Cup, featuring all local players, was played from 22 September to 6 October. Pelita Jaya Jakarta won both final and cup this year with their players, Anthony Beane and Brandon Jawato as the respective MVPs.

== Rule changes ==
Just before the season started, the IBL made numerous adjustments to the league's rules, including introducing some new ones. The move was intended to boost the league's overall competitiveness while maintaining balance and fair competition.

=== Competition format ===
For last season, the IBL used two format. In the regular season, teams were no longer divided into two divisions and were merged into one single league series format. In the playoffs, teams were playing each other in a best-of-three home-and-away format in which teams at home were playing at the venue of their own choosing.

However, for this season, the IBL announced they would ditched the series format in favor of a true home and away format for the entire season, not just in the playoffs. This format will be used next season. The format was introduced to create another revenue stream for clubs, as revenue from home games will enter right into the clubs' coffers.

=== Players ===
==== Draft ====
Starting this season, IBL no longer held the IBL draft. As a replacement, clubs can now freely recruit rookies and foreign players without the draft. IBL also introduced some rules regarding said recruitment.

==== Foreign players ====
IBL permitted clubs to register up to three foreign players for the season instead of just two players last season. However, IBL introduced height restriction on foreign players. Two of them must be under 2 meters while the other one can exceed the height restriction. Clubs can now play two foreign players simultaneously on the field without minutes played limitation. IBL permitted clubs to freely change their foreign players even in the middle of the regular season. However, clubs can no longer change their foreign players in the last three weeks of the regular season before the playoffs.

==== Heritage and naturalized players ====
IBL now recognizes that heritage and naturalized players as local players hence they no longer count as foreign players. However, clubs were not permitted to naturalize foreign players on their own, as it was Perbasi's prerogative. They can only play in the league if they are recognized by Perbasi.

==== Rookie players ====
As with foreign players, clubs can now freely recruit rookie players without the draft with some limitations. First, they can register up to five rookie players. Second, they can only recruit local rookie players, players coming from the clubs' region. Third, clubs can only register rookie players aged 19 and above, and if they want to register players under 19, they must come from the club's development program like an internal academy or from affiliated local clubs or academies.

=== Salary cap ===
To maintain competitive balance among clubs, IBL implemented a salary cap rule. The salary cap for the season is 10 billion rupiah.

== Teams ==
14 clubs are competing this season compared to 16 clubs last season. However, there were some changes to the competing clubs.

=== Team changes ===
- Perbasi announced that they pulled out Indonesia Patriots, which consisted of mostly youth national team prospects, from the IBL. This was due to a new young player development program between Perbasi and the Lithuanian Basketball Federation which involves sending young Indonesian players (who would be Indonesia Patriors' players) to compete abroad, including to Lithuania.
- The license for NSH Mountain Gold Timika was revoked by the IBL due to the club's internal problems.
- West Bandits Solo returned its license to the IBL due to the club's internal problems. Another club from Solo, Kesatria Bengawan Solo bought West Bandits' license to play this season.
- The license for Evos Thunder Bogor was acquired by a new club based in Medan, Rajawali Medan. They are the only IBL club based in the island of Sumatera.

=== Name changes ===
- Elang Pacific Caesar Surabaya changed its name back to Pacific Caesar Surabaya as the partnership between them and a club from Medan, Methodist 2 Hawks, was not renewed.
- Bumi Borneo Basketball changed its name to Borneo Hornbills. They also chose to play their home games at GOR Laga Tangkas in Cibinong, Bogor. This was because facilities in Borneo were inadequate hence insufficient to fully accommodate the needs of the team. However, they hoped to be able to play in Kalimantan in the foreseeable future.
- RANS PIK Basketball moved its homebase to Bogor, West Java. They changed their name to RANS Simba Bogor to reflect said move and for sponsorship reason (Simba Cereal).

=== Venues and locations ===
Locations of 2024 IBL teams.
Red: Clubs; Blue: Region with Multiple Teams

Team	Arena	Home city
Amartha Hangtuah	GOR Universitas Negeri Jakarta (UNJ)	Jakarta
Bali United Basketball	GOR Purna Krida	Badung, Bali
Bali United Basketball	GOR Merpati	Denpasar
Bima Perkasa Jogja	Among Rogo Sports Hall	Yogyakarta
Bima Perkasa Jogja	GOR Pancasila UGM	Yogyakarta
Borneo Hornbills	GOR Laga Tangkas	Cibinong, Bogor
Dewa United Banten	Dewa United Arena	Tangerang
Kesatria Bengawan Solo	Sritex Arena	Solo
Pacific Caesar Surabaya	GOR Pacific Caesar	Surabaya
Pelita Jaya Jakarta	Tennis Indoor Senayan	Jakarta
Pelita Jaya Jakarta	GOR Universitas Negeri Jakarta (UNJ)	Jakarta
Pelita Jaya Jakarta	GOR Soemantri Brodjonegoro	Jakarta
Prawira Harum Bandung	C-Tra Prawira Arena	Bandung
Rajawali Medan	GOR Universitas Medan	Medan
RANS Simba Bogor	Gymnasium Sekolah Vokasi IPB	Bogor
Satria Muda Pertamina	The BritAma Arena	Jakarta
Satria Muda Pertamina	Senayan Basketball Hall	Jakarta
Satria Muda Pertamina	Pertamina Arena	Jakarta
Satya Wacana Saints Salatiga	GOR Knight Stadium	Semarang
Tangerang Hawks	Indoor Stadium Sport Center	Tangerang

=== Personnel and kits ===
Team	Manager	Head coach	Captain	Kit manufacturer
Amartha Hangtuah	(Indonesia) Ardi Darmawan Moeljoto	(Indonesia) Yohanes Kristian	(Indonesia) Fisyaiful Amir	(Indonesia) Injers
Bali United Basketball	(Indonesia) Sigit Sugiantoro	(England) Anthony Garbelotto	(Indonesia) Abraham Wenas	(Indonesia) Specs
Bima Perkasa Jogja	(Indonesia) Fika Nurazam Wirastuti	(Serbia) Predrag Lukić	(Indonesia) Restu Dwi Purnomo	(Indonesia) VNY
Borneo Hornbills	(Indonesia) Andromeda Manuputty	(Indonesia) Ismael Tan	(Indonesia) Raymond Shariputra	(Indonesia) Stayhoops
Dewa United Banten	(Indonesia) Zaki Iskandar	(Argentina) Pablo Favarel	(Indonesia) Kaleb Ramot Gemilang	(Indonesia) Juara
Kesatria Bengawan Solo	(Indonesia) Arfinsa Gunawan	(Indonesia) Efri Meldi	(United States) Kentrell Barkley	(Indonesia) Mardani Sportindo
Pacific Caesar Surabaya	(Indonesia) Soegiono Hartono	(United States) John Todd Purves	(Indonesia) Gregorio Claudio Wibowo	(Indonesia) Terra
Pelita Jaya Jakarta	(Indonesia) Adhi Pratama Prasetyo Putra	(Indonesia) Johannis Winar	(Indonesia) Andakara Prastawa	(Indonesia) Nakara
Prawira Harum Bandung	(Indonesia) Andri Syarel Octreanes	(United States) David Singleton	(Indonesia) Yudha Saputera	(Indonesia) Sportama
Rajawali Medan	(Indonesia) A Kiat	(Indonesia) Raoul Miguel Hadinoto	(Indonesia) Hendra Thio	(Indonesia) Global
RANS Simba Bogor	(Indonesia) Andrey Rido Mahardika	(Netherlands) Thomas Roijakkers	(Indonesia) Januar Kuntara	(Indonesia) Juara
Satria Muda Pertamina	(Indonesia) Theodore Wira Adi	(Indonesia) Youbel Sondakh	(Indonesia) Arki Dikania Wisnu	(Indonesia) Juara
Satya Wacana Saints Salatiga	(Indonesia) Dodik Tri Purnomo	(Indonesia) Jerry Lolowang	(Indonesia) Henry Cornelis Lakay	(Indonesia) One Stop Basketball
Tangerang Hawks	(Indonesia) Indra Budianto	(Indonesia) Antonius Joko Endratmo	(Indonesia) Danny Ray	(Indonesia) Motion Sport

== Foreign, heritage and naturalized players ==
As mentioned before, IBL introduced some changes and new rules regarding foreign players. First, the league no longer held draft so clubs must recruit foreign players on their own. Second, clubs can register up to three foreign players instead the maximum two last season. Third, two of them must be under 2 meters while the other one can exceed the height restriction. Fourth, heritage and naturalized players as local players no longer count as foreign players. Fifth, IBL permitted clubs to change foreign players mid-season without restriction. Clubs can no longer change their foreign players three weeks before playoffs.

- Players named in **bold** indicates the player was registered mid-season.
- Former players named in italics are players that were out of squad or left the club within the season, after the pre-season transfer window, or in the mid-season transfer window, and at least had one appearance.

Teams	Player 1	Player 2	Player 3	Heritage or Naturalized Player	Former players
Amartha Hangtuah	(United States) **Michael Kolawole**	(Belgium) **Thomas De Thaey**	(United States) **Anthony January**	-	(United States) Nick Faust (United States) Ronald Delph (United States) Zoran Talley Jr.
Bali United Basketball	(United States) Xavier Cannefax	(United States) Kierell Green	(United States) Ryan Batte	-	-
Bima Perkasa Jogja	(United States) Garrius Holloman	(United States) **Brandis Raley-Ross**	(Uganda) (United Kingdom) **Jonathan Komagum**	-	(United States) Martyce Kimbrough (Brazil) Feliciano Perez Neto
Borneo Hornbills	(United States) **Michael Qualls**	(United States) **Steve Taylor Jr.**	(Jamaica) (United States) **Akeem Scott**	(Indonesia) (United States) Jamarr Johnson	(United States) Devondrick Walker (United States) Travion Leonard (United States) Najeal Young
Dewa United Banten	(United States) Jordan Adams	(The Bahamas) (United States) Tavario Miller	(Dominican Republic) Gelvis Solano	(Indonesia) (United States) Lester Prosper	-
Kesatria Bengawan Solo	(United States) Kentrell Barkley	(United States) **C. J. Gettys**	(United States) **Travin Thibodeaux**	-	(United States) Jason Copman (United States) Taylor Johns
Pacific Caesar Surabaya	(United States) Jaylyn Richardson	(United States) **Keljin Blevins**	(United States) **Stephen Hurt**	-	(United States) Kamani Johnson (United States) Anthony January (Canada) Nick Wiggins
Pelita Jaya Jakarta	(United States) K.J. McDaniels	(Philippines) (United States) **Justin Brownlee**	(United States) **James Dickey III**	(Indonesia) (United States) Anthony Beane	(United States) Malachi Richardson (Lebanon) (United States) Thomas Robinson
Prawira Harum Bandung	(Dominican Republic) **Brandone Francis**	(United States) **Antonio Hester**	(Chile) **Manny Suarez**	-	(Lithuania) Julius Jucikas (United States) Christian James (United States) Dane Miller Jr. (United States) James Gist
Rajawali Medan	(United States) Jabari Bird	(United States) **Patrick McGlynn**	(Denmark) **Jonas Bergstedt**	-	(United States) Quintin Dove (United States) Wendell Lewis
RANS Simba Bogor	(United States) Le'Bryan Nash	(United States) **Kenney Funderburk**	(United States) **John Fields**	(United Kingdom) (Netherlands) Devon van Oostrum	(United States) Malik Dunbar (United States) Joshua Caldwell (Jamaica) (United States) Jerome Jordan
Satria Muda Pertamina	(Cuba) **Reynaldo Garcia Zamora**	(Ukraine) **Artem Pustovyi**	(United States) **Elgin Cook**	(Indonesia) (Senegal) Dame Diagne	(United States) Trey Davis (United States) Jarred Shaw (United States) Myke Henry
Satya Wacana Saints Salatiga	(United States) Tyree Robinson	(United States) Isaac Asrat	(United States) Mikey Henn	-	-
Tangerang Hawks	(United States) **Nick Stover**	(United States) **Steven Green**	(United Kingdom) **Morakinyo Williams**	-	(Serbia) Nemanja Bešović (United States) Amir Williams (United States) Xavier Alexander (United States) Augustus Stone

== Schedule ==
182 matches would be played in the IBL regular season. Each team will play each other twice, once at each team's home stadium. Here is the preliminary schedule of the season. During the month of Ramadan, the matches will be played exclusively at night.

Phase	Week	Date
Regular season	Week 1 – 4	13 January – 4 February 2024
General election and FIBA Asia Cup qualifiers break
Regular season	Week 5 – 8	1 – 24 March 2024
Eid al-Fitr and BCL Asia qualifiers break
Regular season	Week 9	17 – 21 April 2024
BCL Asia qualifiers break
All-Star Game – 27 April 2024
Regular season	Week 10 – 19	1 May – 7 July 2024
Playoffs (Best of three)	First Round	11 – 21 July 2024
Playoffs (Best of three)	Semi-finals	25 July – 4 August 2024
Playoffs (Best of three)	Finals	25 July – 4 August 2024
All Indonesian Cup	Tournament	22 September – 6 October 2024

== Regular season ==
=== League table ===
Pos	Team	Pld	W	L	PF	PA	PD	Pts	Qualification
1	Dewa United Banten	26	22	4	2586	2124	+462	48	Advance to Playoffs
2	Pelita Jaya Bakrie	26	21	5	2292	1964	+328	47	Advance to Playoffs
3	Prawira Bandung	26	21	5	2168	1904	+264	47	Advance to Playoffs
4	Kesatria Bengawan Solo	26	19	7	2206	2088	+118	45	Advance to Playoffs
5	Satria Muda Pertamina	26	19	7	2357	2036	+321	45	Advance to Playoffs
6	RANS Simba Bogor	26	16	10	2194	2174	+20	42	Advance to Playoffs
7	Bali United	26	13	13	2089	2105	−16	39	Advance to Playoffs
8	Borneo Hornbills	26	11	15	2162	2196	−34	37	Advance to Playoffs
9	Rajawali Medan	26	10	16	2001	2198	−197	36	
10	Amartha Hangtuah	26	9	17	2096	2203	−107	35	
11	Tangerang Hawks	26	8	18	2052	2162	−110	34	
12	Satya Wacana	26	6	20	1867	2161	−294	32	
13	Bima Perkasa	26	4	22	1830	2246	−416	30	
14	Pacific Caesar	26	3	23	2019	2358	−339	29	

Updated to match(es) played on 9 July 2024. Source: IBL Indonesia

=== Results ===
Home \ Away	AHT	BBC	BPJ	BHB	DBC	KBS	PCC	PJB	PWR	RWM	RNS	SMP	SWS	TGH
Amartha Hangtuah	—	84–82	77–61	75–103	78–86	84–91	80–65	83–90	66–73	100–81	75–83	86–107	90–81	82–70
Bali United	84–72	—	80–50	83–87 (OT)	79–93	88–90	86–73	75–89	77–66	93–76	81–88	75–85	69–67	78–74
Bima Perkasa	93–84	68–85	—	76–86	39–86	66–91	83–78	67–101	64–85	52–76	85–89	80–85	79–99	78–75
Borneo Hornbills	90–81	64–79	82–76	—	64–79	93–74	86–92	80–98	92–99	100–86	60–80	84–94	89–93	74–79
Dewa United Banten	129–91	113–81	96–77	93–70	—	102–111	130–95	98–103	84–81	98–73	100–91	75–90	126–85	101–83
Kesatria Bengawan Solo	77–74	88–79	94–66	90–86	85–116	—	90–81	75–94	72–88 (Note: The game was originally held at Sritex Arena, Kesatria's home, in July 6th, but it was stopped during the third quarter with Prawira leading 52 to Kesatria's 39 due to technical issue. The rest of the game was then played at C-Tra Arena, Prawira's home, in July 9th without spectators. IBL sanctioned Kesatria to pay fines and to be fully responsible for organizing the postponed game in Bandung.)	78–45	78–72	94–83	64–55	95–98
Pacific Caesar	76–78	83–95	90–93	70–82	75–95	74–82	—	65–98	65–87	79–85	95–105 (OT)	87–107	101–95	67–81
Pelita Jaya Bakrie	93–84	92–54	91–64	79–72	70–93	88–69	107–89	—	74–77	82–57	97–102	77–100	89–59	99–89
Prawira Bandung	91–83	91–70	85–58	82–78	99–94	64–62	79–63	66–76	—	81–66	79–82	97–98	78–61	76–71
Rajawali Medan	81–77	66–82	105–92	88–91	71–86	73–92	93–87	75–94	65–95	—	80–78	89–88	56–65	88–95
RANS Simba Bogor	91–84	92–68	92–80	88–95	88–101	82–101	79–76	67–85	74–95	68–84	—	86–81	97–81	95–84
Satria Muda Pertamina	89–73	101–88	86–57	94–72	92–101	66–69	93–45	73–72	68–76	104–79	96–67	—	64–84	102–71
Satya Wacana	61–70	83–102	78–57	66–64	57–92	78–93	67–77	63–82	78–100	66–78	51–75	68–112	—	52–70
Tangerang Hawks	75–85	70–76	70–69	80–89	67–97	93–101	102–71	68–72	63–78	75–85	82–83	84–95	83–74	—

Updated to match(es) played on finished. Source: IBL Indonesia
Legend: Blue = home team win; Red = away team win.

== Playoffs ==
The league announced that the 2024 IBL playoffs start on July 11. Eight teams qualified to the playoffs will play in a best-of-three home-and-away format. IBL, in collaboration with Perbasi, also announced the use of foreign FIBA-licensed referees recommended by FIBA Asia. They will work in tandem with local referees in the playoffs. The game between RANS and Prawira opened the playoffs first round.

=== Bracket ===
First Round
1	Dewa United Banten	76	98	102
8	Borneo Hornbills	90	76	95
4	Kesatria Bengawan Solo	64	96	68
5	Satria Muda Pertamina	90	93	98
2	Pelita Jaya Jakarta	96	82
7	Bali United Basketball	66	71
3	Prawira Harum Bandung	81	84	100
6	RANS Simba Bogor	66	91	74

Semifinals
1	Dewa United Banten	75	85
5	Satria Muda Pertamina	89	92
2	Pelita Jaya	84	90
3	Prawira Bandung	80	77

Final
5	Satria Muda Pertamina	84	70	65
2	Pelita Jaya	71	82	73

=== First round ===
==== (1) Dewa United Banten vs. (8) Borneo Hornbills ====
===== Game 1 =====
Vidio
IndiHome TV

July 18
6:00 pm

Report
Boxscore

Borneo Hornbills 90, Dewa United Banten 76
Scoring by quarter: 23–22, 22–23, 20–14, 25–17
Pts: Michael Qualls 21; Rebs: Michael Qualls 8 Asts: Michael Qualls 11	Pts: Gelvis Solano 30; Rebs: Lester Prosper 14; Asts: Hardianus Lakudu 6
Borneo leads series, 1–0

GOR Laga Tangkas, Cibinong, Bogor, West Java

===== Game 2 =====
Vidio
IndiHome TV

July 20
6:00 pm

Report
Boxscore

Dewa United Banten 98, Borneo Hornbills 76
Scoring by quarter: 29–4, 17–27, 26–26, 26–19
Pts: Kaleb Ramot Gemilang 30; Rebs: Lester Prosper 17; Asts: Lester Prosper 8	Pts: Calvin Chrissler 18; Rebs: Qualls, Taylor Jr. 8 each Asts: Steven Orlando 6
Series tied, 1–1

Dewa United Arena, Tangerang, Banten

===== Game 3 =====
Vidio
IndiHome TV

July 21
6:00 pm

Report
Boxscore

Dewa United Banten 102, Borneo Hornbills 95
Scoring by quarter: 30–25, 28–21, 21–22, 23–27
Pts: Gelvis Solano 37; Rebs: Adams, Miller 11 each Asts: Jordan Adams 6	Pts: Michael Qualls 27; Rebs: Michael Qualls 6 Asts: Michael Qualls 10
Dewa United wins series, 2–1

Dewa United Arena, Tangerang, Banten

==== (2) Pelita Jaya Jakarta vs. (7) Bali United Basketball ====
===== Game 1 =====
Vidio
IndiHome TV

July 18
8:00 pm

Report
Boxscore

Bali United Basketball 66, Pelita Jaya Jakarta 96
Scoring by quarter: 12–24, 19–18, 17–31, 18–23
Pts: Abraham Wenas 18; Rebs: Kierell Green 12; Asts: Wenas, Surliyadin, Cannefax 3 each	Pts: K.J. McDaniels 17; Rebs: James Dickey 9 Asts: Beane, Dickey 6 each
Pelita Jaya leads series, 1–0

GOR Merpati, Denpasar, Bali

===== Game 2 =====
Vidio
IndiHome TV

July 20
8:00 pm

Report
Boxscore

Pelita Jaya Jakarta 82, Bali United Basketball 71
Scoring by quarter: 23–19, 16–28, 20–9, 23–15
Pts: Andakara Prastawa 23; Rebs: Justin Brownlee 9 Asts: Justin Brownlee 6	Pts: Kierell Green 26; Rebs: Kierell Green 12; Asts: Xavier Cannefax 7
Pelita Jaya wins series, 2–0

Indoor Stadium Sport Center, Tangerang, Banten

==== (3) Prawira Harum Bandung vs. (6) RANS Simba Bogor ====
===== Game 1 =====
Vidio
IndiHome TV

July 11
6:00 pm

Report
Boxscore

RANS Simba Bogor 66, Prawira Harum Bandung 81
Scoring by quarter: 12–28, 23–11, 17–14, 14–28
Pts: Sanjaya, Fields 14 each Rebs: Le'Bryan Nash 11; Asts: Kenney Funderburk 6	Pts: Brandone Francis 24; Rebs: Manny Suárez 12; Asts: Yudha Saputera 5
Prawira leads series, 1–0

Gymnasium Sekolah Vokasi IPB, Bogor, West Java

===== Game 2 =====
Vidio
IndiHome TV

July 14
6:00 pm

Report
Boxscore

Prawira Harum Bandung 84, RANS Simba Bogor 91
Scoring by quarter: 21–23, 18–28, 26–17, 19–23
Pts: Manny Suárez 24; Rebs: Manny Suárez 15; Asts: Yudha Saputera 6	Pts: Le'Bryan Nash 27; Rebs: John Fields 17; Asts: Januar Kuntara 5
Series tied, 1–1

GOR C-Tra Arena, Bandung, West Java

===== Game 3 =====
Vidio
IndiHome TV

July 15
6:00 pm

Report
Boxscore

Prawira Harum Bandung 100, RANS Simba Bogor 74
Scoring by quarter: 25–16, 36–15, 18–26, 21–17
Pts: Manny Suárez 24; Rebs: Antonio Hester 11; Asts: Yudha Saputera 10	Pts: Le'Bryan Nash 25; Rebs: Kenney Funderburk 7 Asts: Kuntara, Nash 4 each
Prawira wins series, 2–1

GOR C-Tra Arena, Bandung, West Java

==== (4) Kesatria Bengawan Solo vs. (5) Satria Muda Pertamina ====
===== Game 1 =====
Vidio
IndiHome TV

July 11
8:00 pm

Report
Boxscore

Satria Muda Pertamina 90, Kesatria Bengawan Solo 64
Scoring by quarter: 20–10, 31–14, 23–20, 16–20
Pts: Artem Pustovyi 21; Rebs: Artem Pustovyi 11; Asts: Reynaldo Garcia Zamora 11	Pts: Chanceler James Gettys 16; Rebs: Chanceler James Gettys 16; Asts: Chanceler James Gettys 5
Satria Muda leads series, 1–0

BritAma Arena, Jakarta

===== Game 2 =====
Vidio
IndiHome TV

July 14
8:00 pm

Report
Boxscore

Kesatria Bengawan Solo 96, Satria Muda Pertamina 93
Scoring by quarter: 23–32, 30–20, 23–23, 20–18
Pts: Travin Thibodeaux 38; Rebs: Travin Thibodeaux 14; Asts: Chanceler James Gettys 8	Pts: Artem Pustovyi 23; Rebs: Artem Pustovyi 8 Asts: Reynaldo Garcia Zamora 15
Series tied, 1–1

Sritex Arena, Solo, Central Java

===== Game 3 =====
Vidio
IndiHome TV

July 15
8:00 pm

Report
Boxscore

Kesatria Bengawan Solo 68, Satria Muda Pertamina 98
Scoring by quarter: 21–32, 10–24, 20–24, 17–18
Pts: Travin Thibodeaux 22; Rebs: Chanceler James Gettys 12; Asts: Travin Thibodeaux 4	Pts: Reynaldo Garcia Zamora 27; Rebs: Dame Diagne 8 Asts: Reynaldo Garcia Zamora 7
Satria Muda wins series, 2–1

Sritex Arena, Solo, Central Java

=== Semifinals ===
==== (1) Dewa United Banten vs. (5) Satria Muda Pertamina ====
===== Game 1 =====
Vidio
IndiHome TV

July 25
6:00 pm

Report
Boxscore

Satria Muda Pertamina 89, Dewa United Banten 75
Scoring by quarter: 14–18, 29–18, 23–24, 23–15
Pts: Reynaldo Garcia Zamora 26; Rebs: Artem Pustovyi 11; Asts: Reynaldo Garcia Zamora 9	Pts: Jordan Adams 29; Rebs: Jordan Adams 11; Asts: Jordan Adams 6
Satria Muda leads series, 1–0

BritAma Arena, Jakarta

===== Game 2 =====
Vidio
IndiHome TV

July 27
6:00 pm

Report
Boxscore

Dewa United Banten 85, Satria Muda Pertamina 92
Scoring by quarter: 16–24, 23–25, 31–16, 15–27
Pts: Jordan Adams 25; Rebs: Tavario Miller 10; Asts: Jordan Adams 8	Pts: Reynaldo Garcia Zamora 28; Rebs: Reynaldo Garcia Zamora 9 Asts: Reynaldo Garcia Zamora 7
Satria Muda wins series, 2–0

Dewa United Arena, Tangerang, Banten

==== (2) Pelita Jaya Jakarta vs. (3) Prawira Harum Bandung ====
===== Game 1 =====
Vidio
IndiHome TV

July 25
8:00 pm

Report
Boxscore

Prawira Harum Bandung 80, Pelita Jaya Jakarta 84
Scoring by quarter: 17–17, 24–20, 13–24, 26–23
Pts: Yudha Saputera 20; Rebs: Antonio Hester 11; Asts: Yudha Saputera 6	Pts: K. J. McDaniels 24; Rebs: Agassi Goantara 6 Asts: Agassi Goantara 6
Pelita Jaya leads series, 1–0

GOR C-Tra Arena, Bandung, West Java

===== Game 2 =====
Vidio
IndiHome TV

July 27
8:00 pm

Report
Boxscore

Pelita Jaya Jakarta 90, Prawira Harum Bandung 77
Scoring by quarter: 13–12, 28–17, 28–28, 21–20
Pts: Anthony Beane 26; Rebs: James Dickey 7 Asts: Justin Brownlee 5	Pts: Manny Suárez 24; Rebs: Francis, Suárez 8 each Asts: Yudha Saputera 7
Pelita Jaya wins series, 2–0

Indoor Stadium Sport Center, Tangerang, Banten

=== Finals: (5) Satria Muda Pertamina vs. (2) Pelita Jaya Jakarta ===
==== Game 1 ====
Vidio
IndiHome TV

August 1
6:00 pm

Report
Boxscore

Satria Muda Pertamina 84, Pelita Jaya Jakarta 71
Scoring by quarter: 15–21, 24–17, 23–19, 22–14
Pts: Reynaldo Garcia Zamora 25; Rebs: Reynaldo Garcia Zamora 9 Asts: Reynaldo Garcia Zamora 8	Pts: Anthony Beane 15; Rebs: James Dickey 9 Asts: Justin Brownlee 7
Satria Muda leads series, 1–0

BritAma Arena, Jakarta

==== Game 2 ====
Vidio
IndiHome TV

August 3
6:00 pm

Report
Boxscore

Pelita Jaya Jakarta 82, Satria Muda Pertamina 70
Scoring by quarter: 17–12, 21–23, 26–23, 18–12
Pts: K. J. McDaniels 25; Rebs: Brandon Jawato 8 Asts: Anthony Beane 7	Pts: Reynaldo Garcia Zamora 19; Rebs: Artem Pustovyi 9 Asts: Abraham Damar Grahita 4
Series tied, 1–1

Indoor Stadium Sport Center, Tangerang, Banten

==== Game 3 ====
Vidio
IndiHome TV

August 4
6:00 pm

Report
Boxscore

Pelita Jaya Jakarta 73, Satria Muda Pertamina 65
Scoring by quarter: 15-23, 23-3, 16-22, 19-17
Pts: Anthony Beane 23; Rebs: Jawato, McDaniels, Dickey 7 each Asts: Brandon Jawato 5	Pts: Reynaldo Garcia Zamora 18; Rebs: Ali Bagir 10; Asts: Reynaldo Garcia Zamora 6
Pelita Jaya wins series, 2-1

Indoor Stadium Sport Center, Tangerang, Banten

==== Finals MVP ====
MVP	Team
(Indonesia) (United States) Anthony Beane	Pelita Jaya Bakrie

== All Indonesian Cup ==
All games were held in Hall Basket Senayan, DKI Jakarta from 22 September to 6 October 2024. Only local players participated during this competition.

=== Group A ===
Pos	Team	Pld	W	L	PF	PA	PD	Pts	Qualification
1	Dewa United Basketball	3	3	0	213	169	+44	6	Advance to quarter-final
2	Satya Wacana	3	2	1	182	173	+9	5	Advance to quarter-final
3	NSH Mountain Gold	3	1	2	160	208	−48	4	
4	Elang Pacific Caesar	3	0	3	170	175	−5	3	

Updated to match(es) played on unknown. Source: IBL Indonesia

=== Group B ===
Pos	Team	Pld	W	L	PF	PA	PD	Pts	Qualification
1	Satria Muda Pertamina	2	2	0	132	107	+25	4	Advance to quarter-final
2	RJ Amartha Hangtuah	2	1	1	142	130	+12	3	Advance to quarter-final
3	Evos Thunder	2	0	2	106	143	−37	2	

Updated to match(es) played on unknown. Source: IBL Indonesia

=== Group C ===
Pos	Team	Pld	W	L	PF	PA	PD	Pts	Qualification
1	Pelita Jaya Bakrie	3	3	0	229	174	+55	6	Advance to quarter-final
2	Bima Perkasa	3	2	1	176	174	+2	5	Advance to quarter-final
3	Bali United Basketball	3	1	2	179	196	−17	4	
4	RANS PIK Basketball	3	0	3	185	225	−40	3	

Updated to match(es) played on unknown. Source: IBL Indonesia

=== Group D ===
Pos	Team	Pld	W	L	PF	PA	PD	Pts	Qualification
1	Prawira Harum	3	3	0	196	169	+27	6	Advance to quarter-final
2	West Bandits	3	2	1	199	175	+24	5	Advance to quarter-final
3	Bumi Borneo Basketball	3	1	2	173	191	−18	4	
4	Tangerang Hawks	3	0	3	171	204	−33	3	

Updated to match(es) played on unknown. Source: IBL Indonesia

=== Finals round ===
Quarter-finals
November 10
Pelita Jaya	81
West Bandits	79
November 10
Bima Perkasa	55
Prawira Bandung	65
November 10
Dewa United Basketball	75
Amartha Hangtuah	64
November 10
Satria Muda	80
Satya Wacana	50

Semi-finals
November 12
Pelita Jaya	71
Prawira Bandung	57
November 12
Dewa United Basketball	67
Satria Muda	78

Final
November 13
Pelita Jaya	70
Satria Muda	62
Third place
November 13
Prawira Bandung	71
Dewa United Basketball	69

==== Individual awards ====
MVP	Club
(Indonesia) Brandon Jawato	Pelita Jaya Bakrie

== All-Star Games ==
=== Pre-game ===
Skill-challenge champion : (Indonesia) Abraham Wenas (Bali United Basketball)

Three-point contest champion : (United States) Jordan Adams (Dewa United Banten)

Participants
Pos.	Player	Team	Ht.	Points	Final Points
G	Hans Abraham	Prawira Bandung	5'11	18	18
G	Muhammad Aulaz Ariezky	Pacific Caesar	6'1	15	-
F	Gabriel Batistuta Risky	Tangerang Hawks	6'2	17	-
G	Abraham Damar Grahita	Satria Muda Pertamina	5'11	15	-
G	Devon van Oostrum	RANS Simba Bogor	6'4	11	-
G	Jordan Adams	Dewa United Banten	6'5	21	27
G	Yudha Saputera	Prawira Bandung	5'8	12	-

=== Half game ===
Slam-dunk contest champion : (Indonesia) Pandu Wiguna (Prawira Bandung)

Participants
Pos.	Player	Team	Ht.	Points
G	Michael Qualls	Borneo Hornbills	6'4	79
C/F	Pandu Wiguna	Prawira Bandung	6'5	166
F	Zoran Talley Jr.	Amartha Hangtuah	6'7	157
F	David Nuban (injured)	RANS Simba Bogor	6'1	-

=== Game ===
==== Team Legacy ====
Pos	Name	Club	Votes
Starters
G	(Indonesia) Abraham Damar Grahita	Satria Muda Pertamina	7.542
G	(Dominican Republic) Brandone Francis	Prawira Bandung	5.245
F	(Indonesia) Kaleb Ramot	Dewa United Banten	4.491
C/F	(Indonesia) Pandu Wiguna	Prawira Bandung	4.626
G	(United Kingdom) Devon van Oostrum	RANS Simba Bogor	4.766
Reserves
G	(Indonesia) Kevin Moses Poetiray	Kesatria Bengawan Solo	4.269
C	(Indonesia) Vincent Kosasih	Pelita Jaya Bakrie	4.479
G	(Indonesia) Andakara Prastawa	Pelita Jaya Bakrie	5.485
G	(Indonesia) Abraham Wenas	Bali United Basketball	4.249
G/F	(Indonesia) Brandon Jawato	Pelita Jaya Bakrie	4.170
G	(United States) Jordan Adams	Dewa United Banten	3.378
G	(United States) Augustus Stone Jr.	Tangerang Hawks	1.782
Coach
	(United States) David Singleton	Prawira Bandung	4.779

==== Team Future ====
Pos	Name	Club	Votes
Starters
G	(Indonesia) Yudha Saputera	Prawira Bandung	6.993
F	(Indonesia) Ali Bagir	Satria Muda Pertamina	6.144
F/C	(Indonesia) Kelvin Sanjaya	Prawira Bandung	4.409
G	(Dominican Republic) Gelvis Solano	Dewa United Banten	4.406
C	(Indonesia) Lester Prosper	Dewa United Banten	3.396
Reserves
G	(Indonesia) Muhamad Arighi	Pelita Jaya Bakrie	3.850
F	(Indonesia) Muhammad Fhirdan Guntara	Prawira Bandung	3.183
G	(Indonesia) Daffa Dhoifullah	Pacific Caesar	3.043
G	(Indonesia) Hendrick Xavi Yonga	Pelita Jaya Bakrie	3.230
F	(Indonesia) Julian Chalias	Satria Muda Pertamina	3.273
C	(Indonesia) Argus Sanyudy	RANS Simba Bogor	3.620
F	(United States) K.J. McDaniels	Pelita Jaya Bakrie	2.774
C	(United States) Jarred Shaw	Satria Muda Pertamina	1.644
Coach
	(Indonesia) Johannis Winar	Pelita Jaya Bakrie	3.806

Vidio

27 April 2024
18:30 pm WIB

Team Future 121, Team Legacy 116

BritAma Arena, Jakarta
Attendance: 5,000

==== Most Valuable Player ====
Country	Name	Team
(Indonesia)	Lester Prosper	Dewa United Banten

== Awards ==
2024 IBL awards
Award	Recipient(s)	Finalists
IBL Most Valuable Player Award	(United States) Kentrell Barkley (Kesatria Bengawan Solo)	Jordan Adams (Dewa United Basketball); Stephen Hurt (Pacific Caesar)
Local Player of the Year	(Indonesia) Abraham Damar Grahita (Satria Muda Pertamina)	Abraham Wenas (Bali United Basketball); Yudha Saputera (Prawira Bandung)
Rookie of the Year	(Indonesia) Radithyo Wibowo (Dewa United Banten)	Imanuel Mailensun (Satya Wacana Salatiga); Andrew William Lensun (Tangerang Hawks)
Coach of the Year	(United States) David Singleton (Prawira Bandung)	Johannis Winar (Pelita Jaya); Youbel Sondakh (Satria Muda Pertamina)
Defensive Player of the Year	(Indonesia) Muhammad Reza Guntara (Pelita Jaya)	Brandon Jawato (Pelita Jaya); Yudha Saputera (Prawira Bandung)
Sixthman of the Year	(Indonesia) Hans Abraham (Prawira Bandung)	Brandon Jawato (Pelita Jaya); Ponsianus Nyoman Indrawan (Bali United Basketball)
Most Improved Player of the Year	(Indonesia) Avin Kurniawan (Bima Perkasa Jogja)	Respati Ragil (Rajawali Medan); Fisyaiful Amir (Amartha Hangtuah)
Finals MVP	(United States) (Indonesia) Anthony Beane (Pelita Jaya)	
Referee of the Year	(Indonesia) Budi Marfan	Haryanto Sutaryo; Arnaz Anggoro

- All-Local IBL First Team:
  - Abraham Damar, Satria Muda Pertamina
  - Yudha Saputera, Prawira Bandung
  - Kaleb Gemilang, Dewa United Banten
  - Muhammad Reza Guntara, Pelita Jaya
  - Pandu Wiguna, Prawira Bandung
- All-Local IBL Second Team:
  - Abraham Wenas, Bali United Basketball
  - Fisyaiful Amir, Amartha Hangtuah
  - Brandon Jawato, Pelita Jaya
  - Juan Laurent, Satria Muda Pertamina
  - Ponsianus Nyoman Indrawan, Bali United Basketball

- All-IBL Tokopedia First Team:
  - Michael Qualls, Borneo Hornbills
  - Gelvis Solano, Dewa United Banten
  - Jordan Adams, Dewa United Banten
  - Kentrell Barkley, Kesatria Bengawan Solo
  - Stephen Hurt, Pacific Caesar
- All-IBL Tokopedia Second Team:
  - Brandone Francis, Prawira Bandung
  - Jabari Bird, Rajawali Medan
  - Le'Bryan Nash, RANS Simba Bogor
  - K.J. McDaniels, Pelita Jaya
  - Tavario Miller, Dewa United Banten

- All-Local IBL Defensive Team:
  - Brandon Jawato, Pelita Jaya
  - Yudha Saputera, Prawira Bandung
  - Kaleb Gemilang, Dewa United Banten
  - Muhammad Reza Guntara, Pelita Jaya
  - Nuke Tri Saputra, Kesatria Bengawan Solo
- All-IBL Defensive Team:
  - Kierell Green, Bali United Basketball
  - Stephen Hurt, Pacific Caesar
  - Le'Bryan Nash, RANS Simba Bogor
  - Steve Taylor Jr., Borneo Hornbills
  - Kentrell Barkley, Kesatria Bengawan Solo
