= Radoslav Peković =

Serbian basketball player

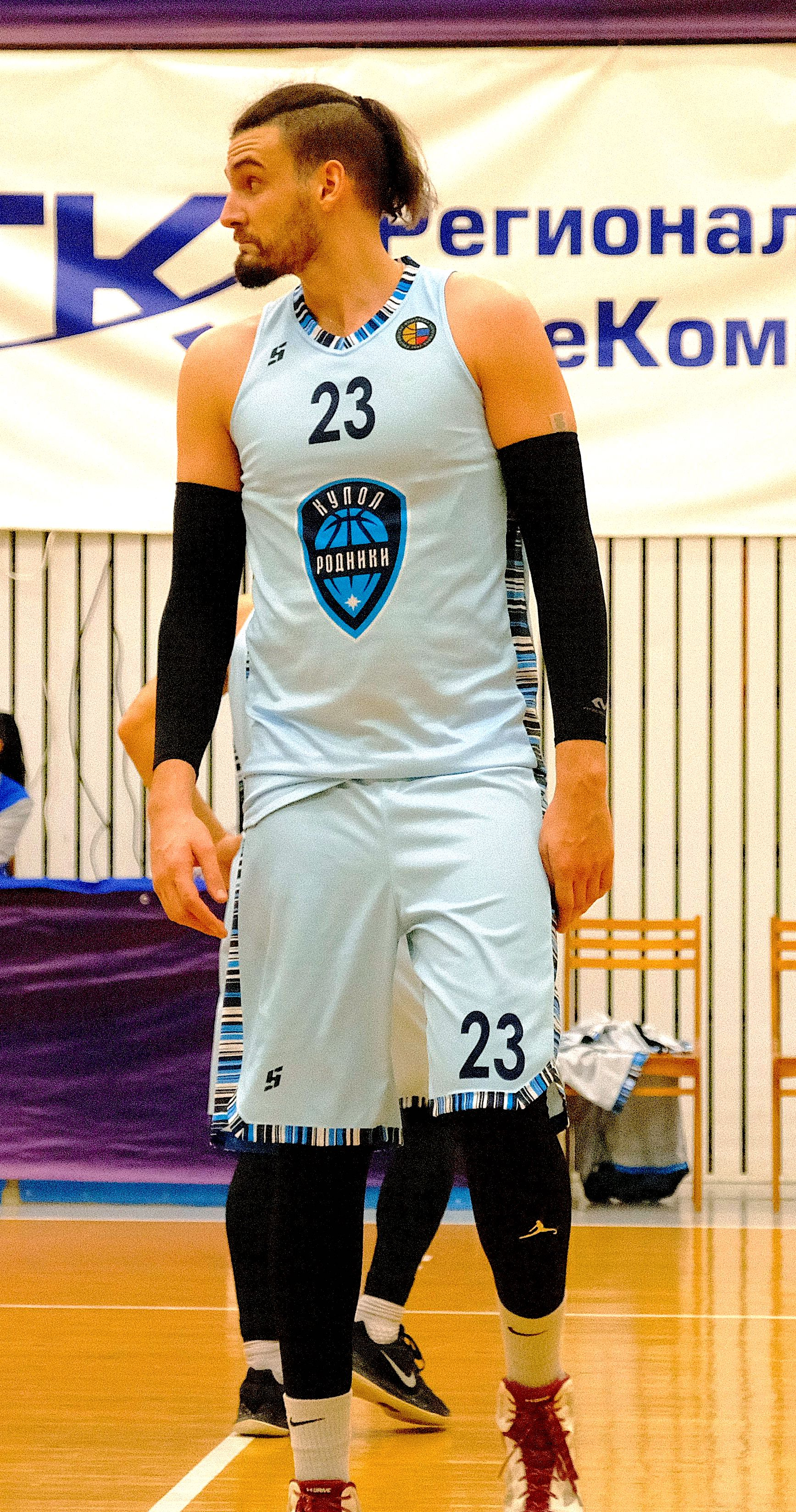
- Peković in 2021

No. 23 – RANS Simba Bogor
- Position: Center
- League: IBL

Personal information
- Born: 23 March 1994 (age 32) Novi Sad, FR Yugoslavia
- Listed height: 2.16 m (7 ft 1 in)
- Listed weight: 114 kg (251 lb)

Career information
- NBA draft: 2016: undrafted
- Playing career: 2013–present

Career history
- 2012–2015: Crvena zvezda
- 2013–2015: → FMP
- 2015–2016: Tamiš
- 2016–2017: Kumanovo
- 2017–2019: Spartak Saint Petersburg
- 2019–2020: Dzūkija Alytus
- 2020: Liepājas Lauvas
- 2020–2021: Kupol-Rodniki
- 2021–2022: Gladiators Trier
- 2022–2023: Best Balıkesir
- 2023: BC Šiauliai
- 2023: Saint-Chamond
- 2024: Cedi Osman
- 2024–2025: Al Sadd
- 2025: JS Kairouan
- 2025: Hefei Storm
- 2025–2026: Hangzhou Jingwei
- 2026–present: RANS Simba Bogor

Radoslav Peković (Serbian Cyrillic: Радослав Пековић; born 23 March 1994) is a Serbian professional basketball player for RANS Simba Bogor of the Indonesian Basketball League (IBL).

== Career ==
Peković signed his first professional contract with Crvena zvezda in August 2012 after spending 18 months in Geoplin Slovan's youth program. After playing two years at loan with FMP, in September 2015, he signed with Tamiš.

In October 2017, Peković signed with Russian club Spartak Saint Petersburg.

On 18 August 2019 Peković signed with Dzūkija Alytus of the Lithuanian Basketball League (LKL).

On 8 September 2021 Peković signed with Gladiators Trier of the French ProA.

On 23 June 2022 Peković signed with Best Balıkesir of the Turkish Basketball First League.
