= James Dickey (basketball, born 1996) =

American basketball player (born 1996)

No. 11 – Hapoel Ironi Eilat
- Position: Power forward / center
- League: Israeli Basketball Premier League

Personal information
- Born: November 28, 1996 (age 29) Raleigh, North Carolina, U.S.
- Listed height: 6 ft 10 in (2.08 m)
- Listed weight: 215 lb (98 kg)

Career information
- High school: Word of God Christian Academy (Raleigh, North Carolina)
- College: UNC Greensboro (2016–2020)
- NBA draft: 2020: undrafted
- Playing career: 2020–present

Career history
- 2020–2021: Szedeák
- 2021: Göttingen
- 2021–2022: Hapoel Haifa
- 2022: JL Bourg
- 2022–2023: Prometey
- 2023–2024: Alba Fehérvár
- 2024–2025: Pelita Jaya
- 2026: Phoenix Super LPG Fuel Masters
- 2026–present: Hapoel Ironi Eilat

Career highlights
- IBL champion (2024); SoCon Defensive Player of the Year (2018); Second-team All-SoCon (2018); 2× Third-team All-SoCon (2019, 2020); SoCon All-Freshman Team (2017)

James L. Dickey III (born November 28, 1996) is an American professional basketball player for Hapoel Ironi Eilat of the Israeli Basketball Premier League. He plays the power forward and center positions. Dickey played college basketball for the University of North Carolina at Greensboro, with whom he was the 2017–18 Southern Conference Defensive Player of the Year. During his college career he led the Southern Conference once in rebounds, and twice in blocked shots.

== Early life ==
Dickey is the son of James Dickey Jr. and Joanne Jeffreys. He has one sibling, an older sister Auriel. His hometown is Raleigh, North Carolina. He stands 6 ft 10 in (208 cm), and weighs 215 pounds (98 kg).

== High school career ==
Dickey attended and played basketball at Word of God Christian Academy in North Carolina. He averaged 10.2 points, 12.4 rebounds, and 4.8 blocks per game as a senior. He was ranked the No. 20 overall prospect in North Carolina in the class of 2015, and was rated the No. 4 power forward in the class.

== College career ==
In 2015–16, Dickey sat out his freshman year at the University of North Carolina at Greensboro as a redshirt. He majored in Communication Studies.

In 2016–17 as a redshirt freshman, Dickey averaged 6.3 points, 7.2 rebounds (3rd in the Southern Conference), and 1.3 blocks (2nd) per game for the UNC Greensboro Spartans. He shot 58.2% (8th) from the field, and 53.6% from the free throw line. He was named to the Southern Conference's All-Freshman Team and All-Tournament Team, and Second Team All-SoCon.

In 2017–18 as a redshirt sophomore Dickey averaged 8.9 points per game and led the SoCon in rebounding (286 rebounds; 8.3 rebounds per game), offensive rebounds (2.9 per game), and blocked shots (2.2 per game; 33rd in the nation). He was third in the SoCon in defensive rebounds (5.5 per game). His 71 blocks tied for fourth-most in a single-season in school history, and his 275 rebounds were sixth. Dickey set a UNCG single-game record with eight blocks against East Tennessee State on February 12, 2018. He was named the SoCon Defensive Player of the Year, and to the Secon All-Tournament Team and Second Team All-SoCon. Dickey helped UNC Greensboro reach the NCAA Tournament before losing in the first round to Gonzaga.

In 2018–19 as a redshirt junior, he averaged 7.5 points, 1.9 blocks (3rd in the conference), 8.0 rebounds (6th), and 1.3 steals per game (8th), and tied his single-game season-high in rebounds with 15 against Furman University on March 10, 2019. He was named Third Team All-SoCon, and to the SoCon All-Tournament Team.

In 2019–20 as a redshirt senior, he averaged 8.7 points per game, his 9.3 rebounds per game were second in the SoCon, and his 3.0 offensive rebounds per game and 53 blocks (1.7 per game) were both the best in the conference. He had a .582% two-point field goal percentage. He was named Third Team All-SoCon.

He ended his college career second in SoCon history with 1,000 career points, 1,000 career rebounds and 200 career blocks. His 1,060 rebounds are a Spartan record, and his 222 blocks are second all-time.

== Professional career ==
Dickey started his professional career playing in 2020–21 for Szedeák in the Hungary NB1/A Division, for whom he averaged 12.8 points, 12.4 rebounds (leading the division by 2.4 rebounds per game), and 1.2 blocks (2nd) per game, over 35 games. He then played eight games in 2021 for BG Goettingen in the German Basketball Bundesliga. Dickey parted ways with the team on November 20.

On November 28, 2021, Dickey signed with Hapoel Haifa of the Israeli Basketball Premier League. In 2021-22 in 22 games he averaged 20.5 minutes, 8.5 points, 7.0 rebounds (9th in the league), 0.7 assists, 1.1 steals, and 1.5 blocks (3rd) per game, shooting 57.6% from the field.

On July 2, 2022, Dickey signed with JL Bourg of the French LNB Pro A and EuroCup. In 2022 he played six games for the team, in which he averaged 14.3 minutes, 4.0 points, 3.2 rebounds, 0.2 assists, 0.8 steals, and 0.3 blocks per game, shooting 62.5% from the field.

In 2022-23 he played 10 games for BC Prometey in the Ukrainian Basketball SuperLeague, in which he averaged 10.2 minutes, 4.5 points,4.0 rebounds, 0.5 assists, 0.5 steals, and 0.7 blocks per game, shooting 76.0% from the field.

In 2023-24, Dickey played for Alba Fehérvár in the Hungarian Nemzeti Bajnokság I. In 40 games he averaged 26.6 minutes, 11.8 points, 9.9 rebounds, 1.5 assists, 1.1 steals, and 1.4 blocks per game, shooting 58.8% from the field.

On May 24, 2024, Dickey signed with Pelita Jaya of the Indonesian Basketball League (IBL), replacing Thomas Robinson.

In December 2024, he returned to the Pelita Jaya for the 2025 IBL season. In 2025-26 in 8 games he averaged 36.6 minutes, 19.6 points, 19.6 rebounds, 4.4 assists, 2.2 steals, and 1.8 blocks per game, shooting 53.5% from the field.

In 2026-27, he is playing for Hapoel Ironi Eilat of the Israeli Basketball Premier League.
