= Argus Sanyudy =

Indonesian basketball player

No. 10 – Kesatria Bengawan Solo
- Position: Center
- League: IBL

Personal information
- Born: 1 August 2000 (age 26) Siak Regency, Indonesia
- Listed height: 194 cm (6 ft 4 in)
- Listed weight: 115 kg (254 lb)

Career information
- High school: SMAN 1 (Siak, Indonesia)
- College: Perbanas Institute
- Playing career: 2020–present

Career history
- 2020-2022: Amartha Hangtuah
- 2022: Satria Muda Pertamina
- 2022-2023: Bima Perkasa Jogja
- 2023-2025: RANS Simba Bogor
- 2025-present: Kesatria Bengawan Solo

Career highlights
- 2× IBL All-Star (2023, 2024); IBL Most Improved Player of the Year (2023); 2× LIMA champion (2022, 2023)

Argus Sanyudy (born August 1, 2000) is an Indonesian professional basketball player for Kesatria Bengawan Solo of the Indonesian Basketball League (IBL).

Sanyudy is known for being the first player from the city of Siak to play in the Indonesian Basketball League.
