= Jordan Adams (basketball, born 1994) =

American basketball player

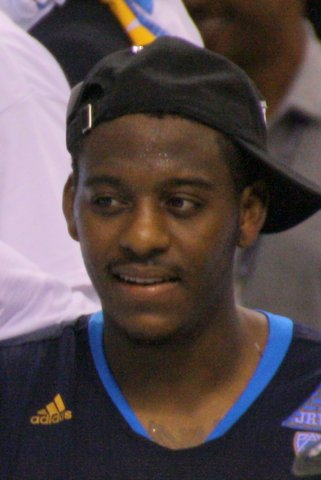
- Adams with the UCLA Bruins in 2014

Free agent
- Position: Shooting guard / small forward

Personal information
- Born: July 8, 1994 (age 32) Atlanta, Georgia, U.S.
- Listed height: 6 ft 5 in (1.96 m)
- Listed weight: 220 lb (100 kg)

Career information
- High school: Central Gwinnett (Lawrenceville, Georgia); Oak Hill Academy (Mouth of Wilson, Virginia)
- College: UCLA (2012–2014)
- NBA draft: 2014: 1st round, 22nd overall pick
- Drafted by: Memphis Grizzlies
- Playing career: 2014–present

Career history
- 2014–2016: Memphis Grizzlies
- 2014–2015: →Iowa Energy
- 2019: Al Wahda
- 2019: Rio Grande Valley Vipers
- 2020: Venados de Mazatlán
- 2020: Libertadores de Querétaro
- 2020–2022: Club Comunicaciones
- 2022: Libertadores de Querétaro
- 2022: Club Atlético Aguada
- 2023: Gladiadores de Anzoátegui
- 2023–2024: Dewa United Banten
- 2024: San Miguel Beermen
- 2024–2026: Dewa United Banten

Career highlights
- 2× All-IBL First Team (2024, 2025); 2× IBL All-Star (2024, 2025); IBL Three-Point Contest champion (2024); SPB champion (2022); First-team All-Pac-12 (2014); IBL champion (2025)
- Stats at NBA.com
- Stats at Basketball Reference

Jordan LaVell Adams (born July 8, 1994) is an American professional basketball player who last played for Dewa United Banten of the Indonesian Basketball League (IBL). He played college basketball for the UCLA Bruins. He was the first UCLA freshman to score 20 or more points in his first four games, and was an all-conference first-team selection in the Pac-12 Conference in his sophomore year. After deciding to forgo his remaining college eligibility and enter the 2014 NBA draft, Adams was selected by Memphis Grizzlies in the first round with the 22nd overall pick. He played two seasons with Memphis before being waived after multiple knee surgeries.

== Early life ==
Adams was born in Atlanta to John Adams, a nutrition manager, and Sabrina Robinson Johnson, a dental hygienist. His parents never married but remained friends. When Adams was in the fourth grade and his life began to revolve around American football and basketball, he moved from his mother's house to his father's. One of Adams' coaches was usually his father from when he was six until he was 16.

Adams attended Central Gwinnett High School in Lawrenceville, Georgia, for his first two seasons. He transferred to Oak Hill Academy in Virginia for his final two seasons, where he was the ninth player in their basketball program's rich history to score 1,000 career points.

Considered a four-star recruit by ESPN.com, Adams was listed as the No. 9 small forward and the No. 41 player in the nation in 2012.

He also played Amateur Athletic Union (AAU) basketball with the Atlanta Celtics. Shortly after Celtics' coach Korey McCray became an assistant coach at the University of California, Los Angeles (UCLA), Adams accepted an athletic scholarship to play for the UCLA Bruins.

== College career ==
Adams in 2012 joined fellow incoming freshman Shabazz Muhammad, Kyle Anderson, and Tony Parker in a UCLA recruiting class considered the best in the nation. The first of the four recruits to sign, Adams was the only one that was not a McDonald's All-American in high school. Despite the competition, he remained committed to UCLA.

He began the 2012–13 season with 20 or more points in the first four games, becoming the first UCLA freshman to accomplish that feat; he was the first Bruin in any class to start the season with four straight since Don MacLean (6 straight) in 1990–91. Though he did not start until the seventh game of the season, Adams was second on the team in scoring behind Muhammad. He finished the season starting in 27 of 33 games played, ranked eighth in the Pac-12 Conference in scoring with 15.3 points per game, led the conference with 73 steals, and was fourth with an 84.3 free throw percentage. UCLA coach Ben Howland and Arizona Wildcats coach Sean Miller were surprised that Adams did not make the conference's all-freshman team. Miller further believed that Adams should have been named to the All-Pac-12 team as well as the conference's all-defensive team. In the semifinals of the 2013 Pac-12 tournament, Adams scored 11 points in the last six minutes in a comeback victory over Arizona. However, he broke his right foot on the final play of the game; he had fractured the same foot in high school. Without Adams, the Bruins lost their next two games, including a season-ending loss to the Minnesota Golden Gophers in the opener of the 2013 NCAA tournament. Two days after the season ended, Howland was fired and replaced by Steve Alford. Adams did not play basketball for four months while his foot healed.

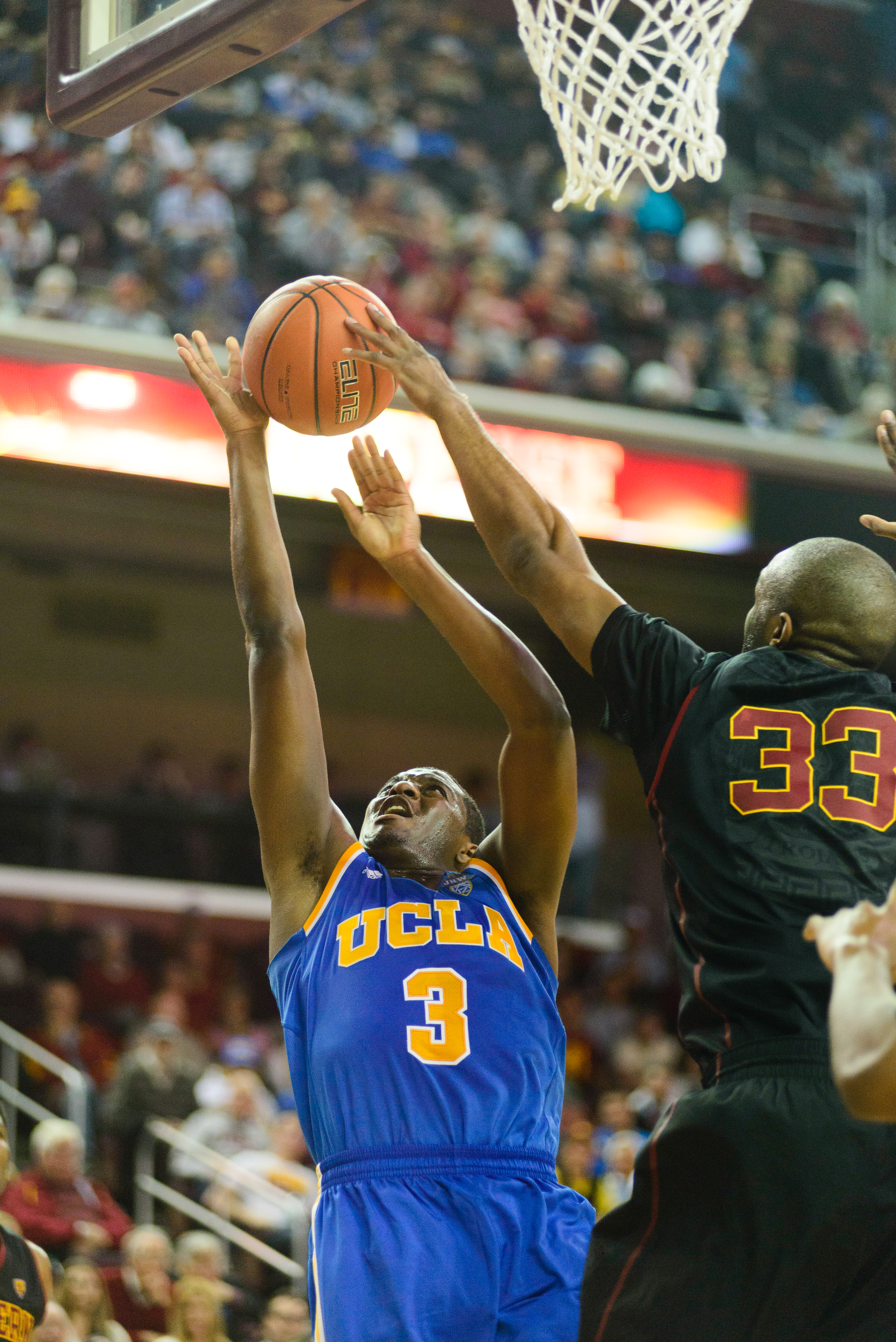
Adams with UCLA against USC in 2014

In his sophomore season in 2013–14, Adams said he enjoyed his role under Alford and his "very open" system, more so than he did with Howland. Coaches gave Adams the nickname 'Spider-Man', after his ability for steals with his "web on the ball." Early in the season, the Inland Valley Daily Bulletin wrote that it could be Adams' last college season given his prospects of playing professionally in the NBA. Adams shot 50% from the field during the Bruins' non-conference schedule, and began Pac-12 play with 21 points on 8-for-13 shooting against the USC Trojans. However, he shot just 36.2% in the next 10 games, before shooting 10-for-14 against Utah for 24 points, his then-career high against a Pac-12 opponent. On February 27, he and Anderson missed one game after being suspended for a violation of team rules. On March 6, Adams scored a career-high 31 as UCLA clinched a No. 2 seed in the upcoming 2014 Pac-12 tournament with a 91–82 win at Washington. The Bruins won the tournament, with Adams hitting a three-point field goal that broke a tie with 45 seconds remaining in a 75–71 upset over No. 4 ranked Arizona in the championship game. For the season, he led the team in both scoring at almost 18 points per game, shot a team-best 83.6 percent of his free throws, led the conference in steals at 2.8 per game, and broke the school record for steals in a season previously set by Cameron Dollar (82) in 1997. Adams was voted to the All-Pac-12 first team, and was also named UCLA's most outstanding team player.

In April 2014, Adams declared early for the NBA draft, foregoing his final two years of college eligibility. Many analysts believed he had a chance to be a first-round pick. He finished his career at UCLA having played 69 games while averaging 16.4 points, 4.6 rebounds, and 2.1 assists. He made 46.7 percent of his field goals and had a school-record 2.43 steals per game.

== Professional career ==
=== Memphis Grizzlies (2014–2016) ===
On June 26, 2014, Adams was selected in the first round with the 22nd overall pick of the 2014 NBA draft by the Memphis Grizzlies. General manager Chris Wallace said Adams graded high in basketball analytics, and vice president of basketball operations John Hollinger praised his ability to "find ways to score and score without needing the ball [in his hands first]". However, Head Coach Dave Joerger as well as the Grizzlies' fans preferred another shooting guard, Rodney Hood, who was taken next by the Utah Jazz with the 23rd pick. After two Summer League games, Adams signed with the Grizzlies on July 7. He began the 2014–15 season with minimal playing time with the Grizzlies, and received multiple assignments to the Iowa Energy of the NBA Development League. While he spent most of the season in the D-League, Adams appeared in 30 games for Memphis, typically when they were behind by a large margin. In limited action, he shot 40 percent from three-point range and his active hands on defense led to a high steal rate.

During the offseason, Adams underwent minor surgery to repair the meniscus in his right knee after averaging 16 points in four games to help the Grizzlies win the Orlando Summer League in July. However, he missed most of the 2015–16 exhibition season as he continued to bothered by soreness related to the procedure. Adams appeared in two out of the team's first four games of the regular season before being sidelined by right knee soreness. On January 12, 2016, he underwent right knee surgery and missed the rest of the season. On June 15, Adams underwent cartilage transplant surgery on his right knee, a procedure that generally addresses issues with motion, bone damage and pain. The following month, he watched Grizzlies summer league games holding a crutch in one hand and wearing a knee brace. Following the preseason on October 24, Adams was waived by the Grizzlies after he was expected to miss the season.

=== 2017–present ===
The following year, Adams joined the Portland Trail Blazers to play in the 2017 NBA Summer League. He played with the Sons of Westwood in The Basketball Tournament 2018, and competed with Al Wadha of Syria in the Dubai International Basketball Championship in 2019. In February 2019, Adams was acquired by the Rio Grande Valley Vipers of the NBA G League. He appeared in two games, averaging 1.5 points, before being waived in March.

In March 2020, Adams joined Venados de Mazatlán of the CIBACOPA of Mexico. In two games, he averaged 23.5 points, 7.0 rebounds, 1.5 assists, and 2.0 steals per game. On July 17, 2020, Adams signed with Libertadores de Querétaro of the Liga Nacional de Baloncesto Profesional (LNBP). After posting 34 points and 10 rebounds against Panteras de Aguascalientes, he was named LNBP player of the week on October 25. He averaged 25.4 points, 5.1 rebounds, 3.5 assists, and 2.2 steals per game. On November 19, 2020, Adams signed with Club Comunicaciones of the Liga Nacional de Básquet. He played with Comunicaciones until April 2022.

After a stint with Libertadores de Querétaro in July and August 2022, Adams played for Club Atlético Aguada in October and November 2022. In February 2023, Adams joined with Gladiadores de Anzoátegui in Venezuela. In December 2023, Adams signed the Dewa United Banten of the Indonesian Basketball League (IBL). In August 2024, Adams signed with San Miguel Beermen of the Philippine Basketball Association (PBA) as the team's import for the 2024 PBA Governors' Cup. In December 2024, Adams returned to the Dewa United Banten for the 2025 IBL season.

== Career statistics ==
=== NBA statistics ===
Legend
GP	Games played	GS	Games started	MPG	Minutes per game
FG%	Field goal percentage	3P%	3-point field goal percentage	FT%	Free throw percentage
RPG	Rebounds per game	APG	Assists per game	SPG	Steals per game
BPG	Blocks per game	PPG	Points per game	**Bold**	Career high

==== Regular season ====
Year	Team	GP	GS	MPG	FG%	3P%	FT%	RPG	APG	SPG	BPG	PPG
2014–15	Memphis	**30**	0	**8.3**	**.407**	**.400**	**.609**	.9	.5	.5	**.2**	3.1
2015–16	Memphis	2	0	7.5	.333	.000	.600	**1.0**	**1.5**	**1.5**	.0	**3.5**
Career		32	0	8.2	.402	.385	.607	.9	.6	.6	.2	3.2

==== Playoffs ====
Year	Team	GP	GS	MPG	FG%	3P%	FT%	RPG	APG	SPG	BPG	PPG
2015	Memphis	4	0	2.5	.667	1.000	.500	.3	.0	.3	.0	1.8
Career		4	0	2.5	.667	1.000	.500	.3	.0	.3	.0	1.8

=== College statistics ===
Year	Team	GP	GS	MPG	FG%	3P%	FT%	RPG	APG	SPG	BPG	PPG
2012–13	UCLA	33	27	30.3	.447	.307	.843	3.8	1.8	2.2	.4	15.3
2013–14	UCLA	36	36	30.1	.485	.356	.836	5.3	2.3	2.6	.1	17.4
Career		69	83	30.2	.467	.331	.839	4.6	2.1	2.4	.2	16.4
