= Anthony Beane =

American basketball player

Anthony Beane Jr.
- Beane Playing for Indonesia against the United Arab Emirates in 2023

Pelita Jaya
- Position: Point guard / shooting guard
- League: IBL

Personal information
- Born: May 6, 1994 (age 32) Sikeston, Missouri, U.S.
- Listed height: 1.88 m (6 ft 2 in)
- Listed weight: 91 kg (201 lb)

Career information
- High school: Normal Community (Normal, Illinois)
- College: Southern Illinois (2012–2016)
- NBA draft: 2016: undrafted
- Playing career: 2016–present

Career history
- 2016–2017: Lukoil Academic
- 2017–2018: Legia Warsaw
- 2018–2019: Ventspils
- 2019–2020: Spirou
- 2020: Virtus Roma
- 2020–2022: Varese
- 2023: Indonesia Patriots
- 2023–present: Pelita Jaya

Career highlights
- IBL champion (2024); IBL All-Star (2025); IBL Finals MVP (2024); Polish League Top Scorer (2018); Bulgarian League champion (2017); First-team All-MVC (2016)

Jerome Anthony Beane Jr. (born May 6, 1994) is an American-Indonesian professional basketball player for the Pelita Jaya Bakrie of the Indonesian Basketball League (IBL). He played college basketball for the Southern Illinois Salukis.

== College career ==
Beane played college basketball at Southern Illinois University, with the Southern Illinois Salukis, from 2012 to 2016.

== Professional career ==
Beane played with Lukoil Academic, of the Bulgarian League. With Academic, he won the Bulgarian League championship, in 2017.

On August 11, 2020, Beane signed with Virtus Roma in Italy's Lega Basket Serie A.

After Virtus Roma's withdrawal from the Serie A due to financial problems, Beane, like all the Roma players, was made free agent. On December 14, 2020, he has signed with Pallacanestro Varese of the Italian Lega Basket Serie A (LBA).

In January 2023, Beane was reportedly tapped as the import of the Indonesian Patriots for their season campaign. In his first game with the Patriots, he recorded 28 points and 6 rebounds in a 61–63 losing campaign over the Satria Muda.
