= Campus League =

Indonesian athletic organization

- Abbreviation: CL
- Founded: 2025
- Headquarters: Jakarta, Indonesia
- Region served: Indonesia
- Members: About 82 schools
- CEO: Ryan Gozali
- Website: https://campusleague.id/

The Campus League is an inter-campus sports competition in Indonesia which started in 2025. This competition involves student-athletes from various universities in Indonesia and in the initial stages is held in a regional format that culminates in a national phase.

Campus League was introduced as a competition that focuses on developing student-athletes and developing college-level sports competitions in Indonesia.

== History ==
The Campus League was first held in October 2025, also known as "Season Zero" as the inaugural season. This initial event served as an introductory phase for the concept of a regionally integrated, nationally-based student sports competition.

In its inaugural season, the Campus League focused on futsal. Competitions were held in several regional areas before progressing to a national phase, which brought together the best teams from each region.

== Basketball ==
Campus League basketball will run this season from April till June, with universities from 5 regions, Jakarta, Bandung, Yogyakarta, Surabaya, Kalimantan. Each and every champion of the region will compete in The Nationals, and the winner will participate in the Asian University Basketball League (AUBL) next season.

Popular Indonesian college teams such as the UPH Eagles, and the Perbanas Rhinos will particapate in the Campus League Jakarta region.
