= Brandon Jawato =

Indonesian-American basketball player

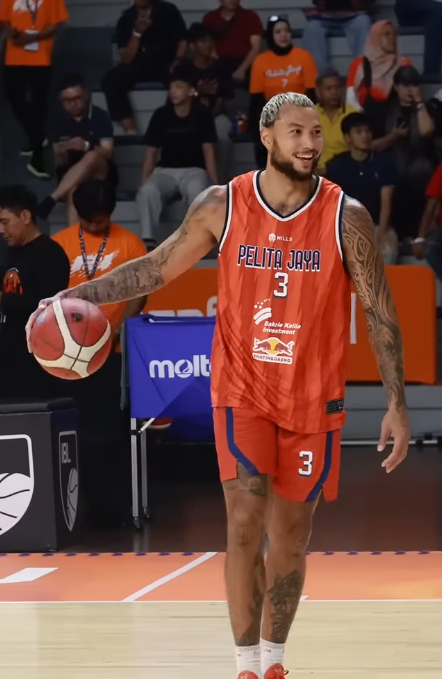
- Jawato with Pelita Jaya in 2026

No. 3 – Pelita Jaya
- Position: Small forward / point guard
- League: IBL

Personal information
- Born: 3 June 1993 (age 33) Santa Monica, California, U.S.
- Listed height: 193 cm (6 ft 4 in)
- Listed weight: 91 kg (201 lb)

Career information
- High school: El Segundo (El Segundo, California)
- College: Hawaii (2011–2015)
- Playing career: 2016–present

Career history
- 2016: Pelita Jaya
- 2018–2019: CLS Knights
- 2019–2020: Indonesia Patriots
- 2021–2022: Utsunomiya Brex
- 2022–2023: SeaHorses Mikawa
- 2023–present: Pelita Jaya

Career highlights
- IBL champion (2024); ABL champion (2019); IBL All-Indonesian Cup MVP (2024); All-IBL Indonesian Second Team (2024); 2x IBL All-Star (2024, 2025)
Medals
Men's basketball
Representing Indonesia
Southeast Asian Games
Gold medal – first place	2021 Vietnam	Team

Brandon Van Dorn Jawato (born June 3, 1993) is an Indonesian professional basketball player for the Pelita Jaya Bakrie of the Indonesian Basketball League (IBL). Born in the United States, He played college basketball for the Hawaii Rainbow Warriors and is a member of the Indonesia national team.

== Personal life ==
Jawato's Indonesian heritage comes from his father, Nyoman Jawato who is Balinese, and his American heritage comes from his mother, Belinda Van Dorn.

== College career ==
=== Redshirt season (2011–12) ===
Jawato earned a scholarship to play for the Hawaii Rainbow Warriors in the NCAA Division I. He was redshirted for his freshman season.

=== Freshman year (2012–13) ===
Jawato played in 28 games with four starts and led the team in 3-pointers made. Jawato returned to action vs Chaminade University on December 15, 2012, scoring his first career points, finished with 10 points in 10 minutes of action. He started back-to-back games vs. East Tennessee State University and Ole Miss.

=== Sophomore year (2013–14) ===
Jawato Appeared briefly in 14 games, and averaged 3.6 minutes per game. He played alongside Christian Standhardinger, who is a member of the Philippines national team.

== Professional career ==
=== Pelita Jaya (2016) ===
After graduating, he made his professional debut in his dad's hometown in the Indonesian Basketball League for Pelita Jaya in the inaugural 2016 IBL season.

=== CLS Knights (2018–2019) ===
After some issues that made Jawato not play professionally for 2 years, in the 2018–19 season Jawato signed with Indonesia's representative in the ASEAN Basketball League (ABL) the CLS Knights, in his 36 games played for them, he averaged 13 points per game, 4,3 rebound per game, 2,5 assist per game, and 1,1 steal per game, and in that same year they won the championship, defeating the Singapore Slingers in a best of three.

=== Indonesia Patriots (2019–2020) ===
Joined the Indonesia Patriots for the 2020 IBL season, in total of 13 games he averaged 16,7 points per game, 6,5 rebounds per game, dan 1,8 assist per game with an averaged playing time of 25,8 minutes per game.

=== B.League career (2021–2023) ===
On August 26, 2021, Jawato signed with Utsunomiya Brex of the B.League filling their Asian Special Slot. On September 2, 2022, Jawato signs with the Seahorses Mikawa, playing his second year in Japan.

=== Pelita Jaya (2023–present) ===
On November 16, 2023, Jawato made a surprising comeback to the IBL, joining his first professional team, Pelita Jaya on a second stint. At April 24, 2024, Jawato was selected as a 2024 IBL All-Star.

== National team career ==
Participated in the FIBA Asia Cup 2021 Qualifiers as a member of the Indonesian national team, and recorded 22 points, 8 rebounds, and 8 assists in the match against Thailand on November 28, 2020.
