= Kenney Funderburk =

American basketball player

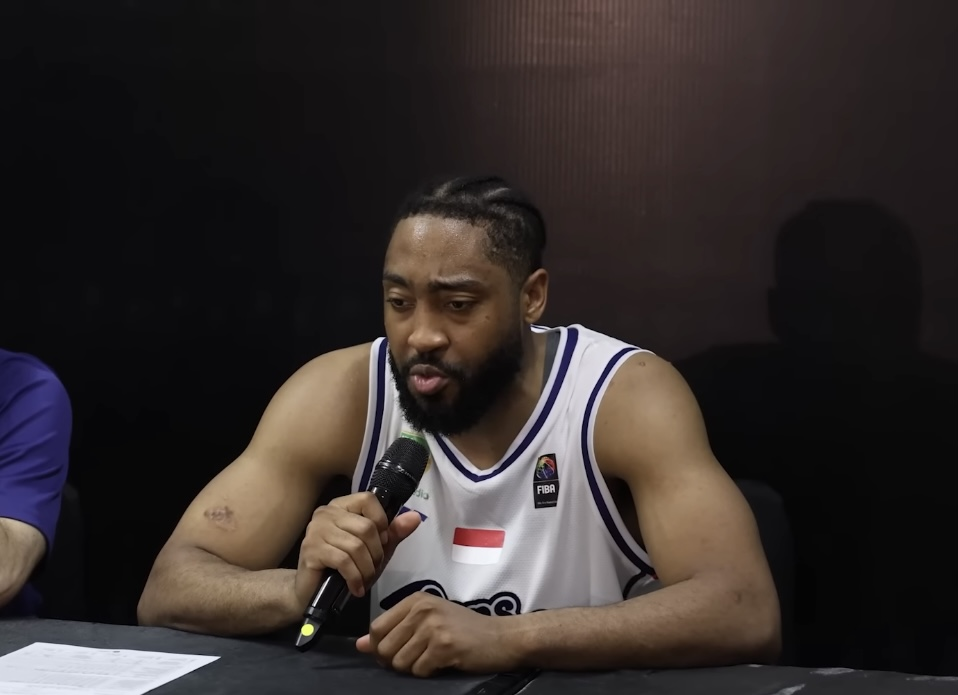
- Funderburk with RANS Simba Bogor in 2024

No. 1 – Sporting Clube de Portugal
- Position: Point guard / shooting guard
- League: IBL

Personal information
- Born: April 13, 1992 (age 34) Charlotte, North Carolina, U.S.
- Listed height: 6 ft 4 in (1.93 m)
- Listed weight: 211 lb (96 kg)

Career information
- High school: Olympic (Charlotte, North Carolina)
- College: Columbus State (2013–2015)
- NBA draft: 2015: undrafted
- Playing career: 2015–present

Career history
- 2015–2016: Dynamo Kyiv
- 2016–2017: BIPA Odesa
- 2017–2018: Korihait
- 2018–2019: Feni Industries
- 2019: Blokotehna
- 2019–2020: Inter Bratislava
- 2020-2021: PVSK Panthers
- 2021–2022: Ironi Kiryat Ata
- 2022–2024: CSU Ploiești
- 2024–present: RANS Simba Bogor

Kenneth Funderburk Jr. (born April 13, 1992) is an American professional basketball player who plays for Sporting Clube de Portugal. He played college basketball for the Columbus State Cougars from 2013 to 2015.

== College career ==
As a senior at Columbus State in 2014-15 Funderburk averaged 19.3 points, 3.1 rebounds and 2.8 assists in 33.4 minutes in 30 appearances.

== Professional career ==
In the season 2017/18 he played for Korihait in Finland. On October 6, 2018, he made his debut for Feni Industries scoring 15 points, 6 rebounds and 10 assist in a 68-86 away win against Pelister. On April 2, 2019, he signed with Macedonian basketball club Blokotehna. On June 30, 2019, he signed with Slovak basketball club Inter Bratislava where the season was canceled early in March 2020 because of the outbreak of COVID pandemic. In 2020-2021 season Kenney played in Hungary for PVSK Panthers based in Pécs. The team took 11th place in the league. Most recently, during season 2021-2022, Kenney was playing for Ironi Kiryat Ata in Israel and together with his team became the Champions of Liga Leumit (basketball) on 20 May, 2022.
