= Asian University Basketball League =

Regional university basketball league in Asia

- Upcoming season or competition: 2026–27 Asian University Basketball League
- Sport: Basketball
- Founded: November 29, 2024; 23 months ago
- First season: 2025
- No. of teams: 12
- Region: Asia-Pacific
- Most recent champion: National Chengchi University
- Website: www.aubl.com

The Asian University Basketball League (AUBL) is a college basketball league featuring teams from the Asia-Pacific region. The league was established in November 2024 as part of a partnership between Realeague and Asian University Sports Federation (AUSF), with its first edition running through August 2025.

Li Jintian, who is the CEO of Realeague, is also the CEO of the AUBL. The league also gained investment from multiple basketball personalities, including Yao Ming, David Blitzer, Joseph Tsai, and Marc Lasry.

== History ==
On November 29, 2024, Realeague entered a ten-year partnership with the Asian University Sports Federation (AUSF) to launch a continental college basketball league for top programs across the Asia continent. At the same time, a test event named the Asian University Basketball Challenge (AUBC) was being hosted in Hong Kong. The AUBC featured six university teams; with Yonsei University from South Korea ultimately winning the championship.

In August 2025, AUBL kickstarted their inaugural season with twelve teams, culminating in National Chengchi University beating Tsinghua University in the Finals to win the first AUBL championship. The inaugural event drew over 65 million viewers across its online live streams. In 2026, the AUBL expanded its reach by adding representatives from the Philippines and Australia.

== Arena ==
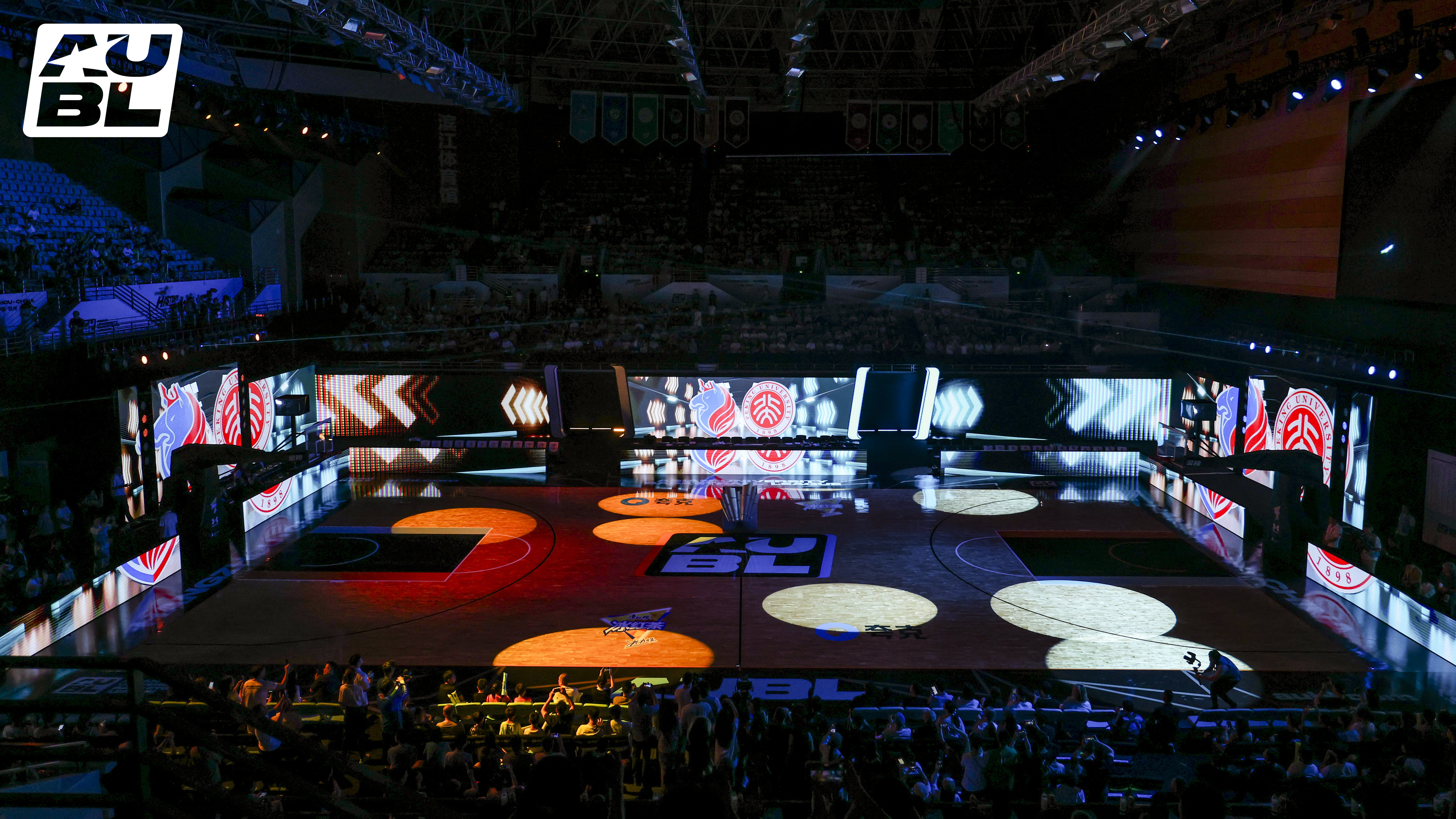
Spectator view of the 270-degree digital screen

Since 2025, the AUBL has hosted all of its games at Binjiang Gymnasium in Hangzhou, China. The AUBL uses a digital arena setup with a 270-degree screen around the perimeter of the court and a fully-digital court.

== Media coverage ==
For the countries without broadcasting rights, the tournament also available via AUBL Youtube channel.

As of the 2026 season
Region	Broadcaster
Australia	beIN Sports
New Zealand	beIN Sports
Brunei	Astro
Malaysia	Astro
China	Migu TV
China	Youku
China	Weibo Sports
China	Zhibo8
China	Xiaohongshu
China	Tencent
Hong Kong	ViuTV
Macau	ViuTV
Indian subcontinent	FanCode
Indonesia	MNC Media
Japan	U-Next
Mongolia	PSN
Philippines	Cignal
Singapore	Hub Sports
South Korea	Coupang Play
Taiwan	Videoland
Thailand	True Sports

== Results ==
Year	Host city	Finals			Third-Place Game		
Year	Host city	Champion	Score	Runner-up	Third place	Score	Fourth place
2025; Details	(China); Hangzhou	(Chinese Taipei); Chengchi University	82–79	(China); Tsinghua University	(Japan); Hakuoh University	90–86	(Mongolia); Etugen University
2026; Details	(China); Hangzhou	(China); Shanghai Jiao Tong University	72–69	(Chinese Taipei); Chengchi University	(Japan); Waseda University	98–91	(China); Tsinghua University
