= Perbanas Rhinos men's basketball =

Indonesian basketball team

Perbanas Rhinos
- University: Perbanas Institute
- Head coach: Zul Fahrizal
- Location: Jakarta, Indonesia
- Nickname: Rhinos

Campus League Champions
- 2026

LIMA Champions
- 2022, 2023

Libama Champions
- 2002, 2003, 2004, 2005, 2006

The Perbanas Rhinos men's basketball team represents Perbanas Institute in Jakarta, Indonesia. They are a member of the Liga Mahasiswa (LIMA) and the Campus League.

== Current roster ==
The current roster for the Campus League.

Pos	Name	Born	Height
G	Zaky Al Hakim	Surakarta	6-1
C	Toraya Pongtuluran	Manado	6-6
G	Rafi Bepasha Darmanto	Jakarta	6-0
C	Muhammad Haikal Malik	Manna	6-4
C	Mochamad Ramzi Alrasyid	Bogor	5-11
F	Mikail Nathan Murryawan	Malang	6-1
G	Jason Edward	Manado	5-8
F	I Gede Mahatma	Nabire	5-10
G	Glenn Patrick	Jakarta	5-8
G	Fathur Rahman	Jakarta	5-11
G	Dhimas Ardhi Respati	Trenggalek	6-2
F	Baltazar Noerisqun	Mataram	6-2
F	Andrew Batunan	Bitung	5-11
F	Andy David Luntungan	Manado	6-2
C	Aji Dipayasa	Bogor	6-5

== 2023 WUBS Roster ==
Perbanas Institute men's basketball team roster for the 2023 World University Basketball Series (WUBS) that is held at Shibuya, Tokyo.

Perbanas Rhinos roster
Players
Coaches

Pos.	No.	Nat.	Name	Height	Year	High School
PG	3	(Indonesia)	Hafizh, Muhammad	5'9" (1.75m)	3rd	SMAN 71 Jakarta
SG	7	(Indonesia)	Oei, Jordan	6'0" (1.83m)	4th	SMA 1 PSKD Jakarta
SG	8	(Indonesia)	Aziz, Ibrahim Sandy	6'2" (1.88m)	6th	SMA 1 PSKD Jakarta
C	10	(Indonesia)	Sanyudy, Argus	6'4" (1.93m)	4th	SMAN 1 Siak
SG	11	(Indonesia)	Sebastian, Abel	5'10" (1.78m)	–	–
SF	12	(Indonesia)	Lapian, Ezra	6'3" (1.91m)	3rd	SMK Kartini Batam
SF	13	(Indonesia)	Manansang, Fernando	6'3" (1.91m)	3rd	SMA St. Lokon Tomohon
G/F	15	(Indonesia)	Gunawan, Rizqia	5'11" (1.8m)	–	–
PG	17	(Indonesia)	Tangkulung, Greans	5'10" (1.78m)	3rd	SMA St. Lokon Tomohon
SG	24	(Indonesia)	Salamena, Daniel	6'2" (1.88m)	2nd	SMAN 10 Malang
C	26	(Indonesia)	Muwardi, James	6'1" (1.85m)	2nd	SMA Harapan Utama
SG	34	(Indonesia)	Kasim, Sahid	6'1" (1.85m)	3rd	SMAN 1 Parung

Head coach

- (Indonesia) Zul Fahrizal

Legend

- (C) Team captain
- Injured

== Notable players ==
- Kelly Purwanto
- Erick Christopher Sebayang
- Dimaz Muharri
- Amin Prihantono
- Sandy Ibrahim Aziz
- Pringgo Regowo
- Fictor Gideon Roring
- Govinda Julian Saputra
- Christian Ronaldo Sitepu
- Daniel Wenas
- Radithyo Wibowo
- Anto Febryanto Boyratan
- Jordan Oei
- Greans Tangkulung
- Argus Sanyudy
- Esha Ezra Lapian
- Fernando Manansang
- Daniel Salamena
- Sahid Kasim
- Mohammed Aofar Hedyan
- Candra Irawan
