= RANS Simba Bogor =

Indonesian basketball team in Bogor, West Java

- 2026 IBL Indonesia
- Leagues: IBL; 2022–present
- Founded: 2022
- History: RANS PIK Basketball (2022–2023); RANS Simba Bogor (2023–)
- Arena: Gymnasium Sekolah Vokasi IPB
- Capacity: 7000
- Location: PIK, Jakarta (2022–2023); Bogor, West Java (since 2023)
- Team colors: Pink, Purple, White, Light Blue
- General manager: Anthony Gunawan
- Head coach: Brian Rowsom
- Affiliations: RANS Entertainment; RANS Nusantara F.C.
- Website: https://www.ransentertainment.co.id/
Home	Away	Third

RANS Simba Bogor is an Indonesian professional basketball team currently playing in the Indonesian Basketball League (IBL), based in the city of Bogor, West Java. It was formerly known as RANS PIK Basketball and were playing in Pantai Indah Kapuk for the first seasons of the club's existence before its move to Bogor before the upcoming IBL season.

The club's owner is famous Indonesian celebrity Raffi Ahmad and the club's president is also famous Indonesian celebrity Gading Marten.

== Coaching history ==
Name	Years
(Indonesia) Koko Heru Setyo Nugroho	2022
(United States) Chris Daleo	2022
(Indonesia) Bambang Asdianto Pribadi	2022-2023
(Indonesia) Wahyu Widayat Jati	2023-2024
(Netherlands) Thomas Roijakkers	2024
(England) Tony Garbelotto	2024-2025
(United States) Brian Rowsom	2025

== Current roster ==
RANS Simba Bogor roster
Players
Coaches

Pos.	No.	Nat.	Name	Ht.	Wt.
PF	0	(Indonesia)	Juan Laurent	1.93 m (6 ft 4 in)
SG	1	(Indonesia)	Danny Ray	1.81 m (5 ft 11 in)
G	2	(Indonesia)	Fatur Dzikri Shihab	1.83 m (6 ft 0 in)
F	4	(Indonesia)	Habib Titoaji	1.88 m (6 ft 2 in)	86 kg (190 lb)
F	5	(United States)	K.J. Buffen (I)	2.03 m (6 ft 8 in)	104 kg (229 lb)
PF	6	(United States)	Aaron Fuller (I)	1.98 m (6 ft 6 in)	107 kg (236 lb)
PG	8	(Indonesia)	Muhamad Hafizh	1.72 m (5 ft 8 in)	63 kg (139 lb)
PG	12	(Indonesia)	Reggie Mononimbar	1.86 m (6 ft 1 in)	85 kg (187 lb)
SG	17	(Indonesia)	Fisyaiful Amir (injured)	1.83 m (6 ft 0 in)	78 kg (172 lb)
C	23	(Serbia)	Radoslav Peković (I)	2.16 m (7 ft 1 in)	114 kg (251 lb)
G	24	(Indonesia)	Daniel Salamena	1.88 m (6 ft 2 in)	83 kg (183 lb)
PF	52	(Indonesia)	Surliyadin Surliyadin	1.88 m (6 ft 2 in)
C	66	(Indonesia)	Galank Gunawan	1.98 m (6 ft 6 in)

Head coach

- (Indonesia) Antonius Joko Endratmo

Assistant coach(es)

- (Indonesia) Yudhi Mardiansyah
- (Indonesia) Agus Pamungkas
- (Indonesia) Wendha Wijaya

Strength & conditioning coach(es)

- (Indonesia) Fathan Kautsar

Legend

- (C) Team captain
- (HP) Heritage player
- (R) Rookie
- (I) Import
- Injured

=== Depth chart ===
Pos.	Starting 5	Bench
C	Radoslav Peković	Galank Gunawan
PF	K.J. Buffen	Rheza Butarbutar
SF	Surliyadin Surliyadin	Daniel Salamena
SG	Aaron Fuller	Reggie Mononimbar
PG	Muhamad Hafizh	Danny Ray

=== Past roster ===
==== 2024 IBL Indonesia ====
RANS Simba Bogor roster
Players
Coaches

Pos.	No.	Nat.	Name	Ht.	Wt.
G	2	(Indonesia)	Oki Wira Sanjaya	1.90 m (6 ft 3 in)	85 kg (187 lb)
G	3	(Indonesia)	Alexander Franklyn	1.80 m (5 ft 11 in)	70 kg (154 lb)
F	5	(Indonesia)	Fatur Dzikri Shihab	1.83 m (6 ft 0 in)	82 kg (181 lb)
F	6	(Indonesia) (Morocco)	Mohammed Aymane Arip (R)	1.94 m (6 ft 4 in)	83 kg (183 lb)
G	7	(United Kingdom) (Netherlands)	Devon van Oostrum (HP)	1.93 m (6 ft 4 in)	90 kg (198 lb)
C	9	(United States)	Aaron Fuller	2.06 m (6 ft 9 in)	107 kg (236 lb)
C	10	(Indonesia)	Argus Sanyudy	1.94 m (6 ft 4 in)	115 kg (254 lb)
F	15	(Indonesia)	Rheza Saputra Butarbutar	1.93 m (6 ft 4 in)	86 kg (190 lb)
SF	17	(Indonesia)	Mei Joni	1.88 m (6 ft 2 in)	83 kg (183 lb)
F	18	(Indonesia)	Darren Vai Celosse (R)	1.95 m (6 ft 5 in)	80 kg (176 lb)
F	23	(United States)	Le'Bryan Nash	2.01 m (6 ft 7 in)	102 kg (225 lb)
G	24	(Indonesia)	Daniel Salamena	1.88 m (6 ft 2 in)	88 kg (194 lb)
G	55	(United States)	Kenney Funderburk	1.93 m (6 ft 4 in)	96 kg (212 lb)
C	97	(Indonesia)	Agus Salim	1.97 m (6 ft 6 in)	94 kg (207 lb)

Head coach

- (Netherlands) Thomas Roijakkers

Assistant coach(es)

- (Indonesia) Parna Abrizalt Hasiholan
- (Indonesia) Deng Matioup Awak

Strength & conditioning coach(es)

- (Indonesia) Tri Prasetyo Utomo

Legend

- (C) Team captain
- (HP) Heritage player
- (R) Rookie
- Injured

== See also ==
- RANS Nusantara FC, the club's football division playing in Liga 1.
- RANS Entertainment

== Notable players ==
- (Jamaica) (United States) Akeem Scott
- (United States) John Fields
- (United States) Kenney Funderburk
- (United States) Le'Bryan Nash
- (Indonesia) Argus Sanyudy
- (Jamaica) Jerome Jordan
- (United Kingdom) Devon van Oostrum
- (Indonesia) Januar Kuntara
- (Indonesia) Mei Joni
- (Indonesia) Daniel Salamena
- (Serbia) Radoslav Peković
- (United States) Aaron Fuller
- (Indonesia) David Nuban
