= Hakuoh University =

Higher education institution in Tochigi Prefecture, Japan

- The emblem of Hakuoh University
- Motto: PLUS ULTRA(Latin)
- Motto in English: Further beyond
- Type: Private
- Established: 1986
- President: Vacant
- Faculty: 264
- Administrative staff: 79
- Students: 4907
- Undergraduates: 4862
- Postgraduates: 45
- Location: Oyama, Tochigi, Japan; 36°18′56″N 139°47′37″E
- Website: hakuoh.jp
- Japan Tochigi Prefecture

Hakuoh University (白鴎大学, Hakuō Daigaku) is a private university in city of Oyama in Tochigi, Japan. The name Hakuoh, means 'white seagull', and the motto Plus ultra, or 'Further beyond'.

== History ==
Hakuoh University was founded by lifelong educator Dr. Kazuyoshi Kamioka in 1986 and currently has about 4,000 Japanese and foreign students studying in its various divisions.

The roots of the Hakuoh University Educational Foundation go back to the establishment of the Ashikaga Textile Women's School in 1915, its incorporation as a high school in 1927, and then its registration as a foundation in 1951. In 1961 the junior high school was added and in 1974 the women's junior college opened. Subsequent to the university's founding and the establishment of the Faculty of Business Management in 1986, the Faculty of Law was added in 1991, and the graduate school was then added in 1999 for advanced studies in both the Faculty of Business Management and the Faculty of Law. Furthermore, in 2004, Hakuoh University added the graduate Law School and the undergraduate Faculty of Human Development.

== Timeline ==
- 1915 Ashikaga Textile Women's School founded.
- 1927 Ashikaga Textile Women's High School incorporated.
- 1951 Hakuoh University Educational Foundation registered.
- 1961 Hakuoh University Women's Junior High School added.
- 1974 Hakuoh University Women's Junior College established.
- 1986 Hakuoh University founded as a coeducational institution. Faculty of Business Management established.
- 1991 Faculty of Law added.
- 1999 Hakuoh University Graduate School founded for advanced studies in both the Faculty of Business Management and Faculty of Law.
- 2004 Law School and undergraduate Faculty of Human Development added.

== Campus ==
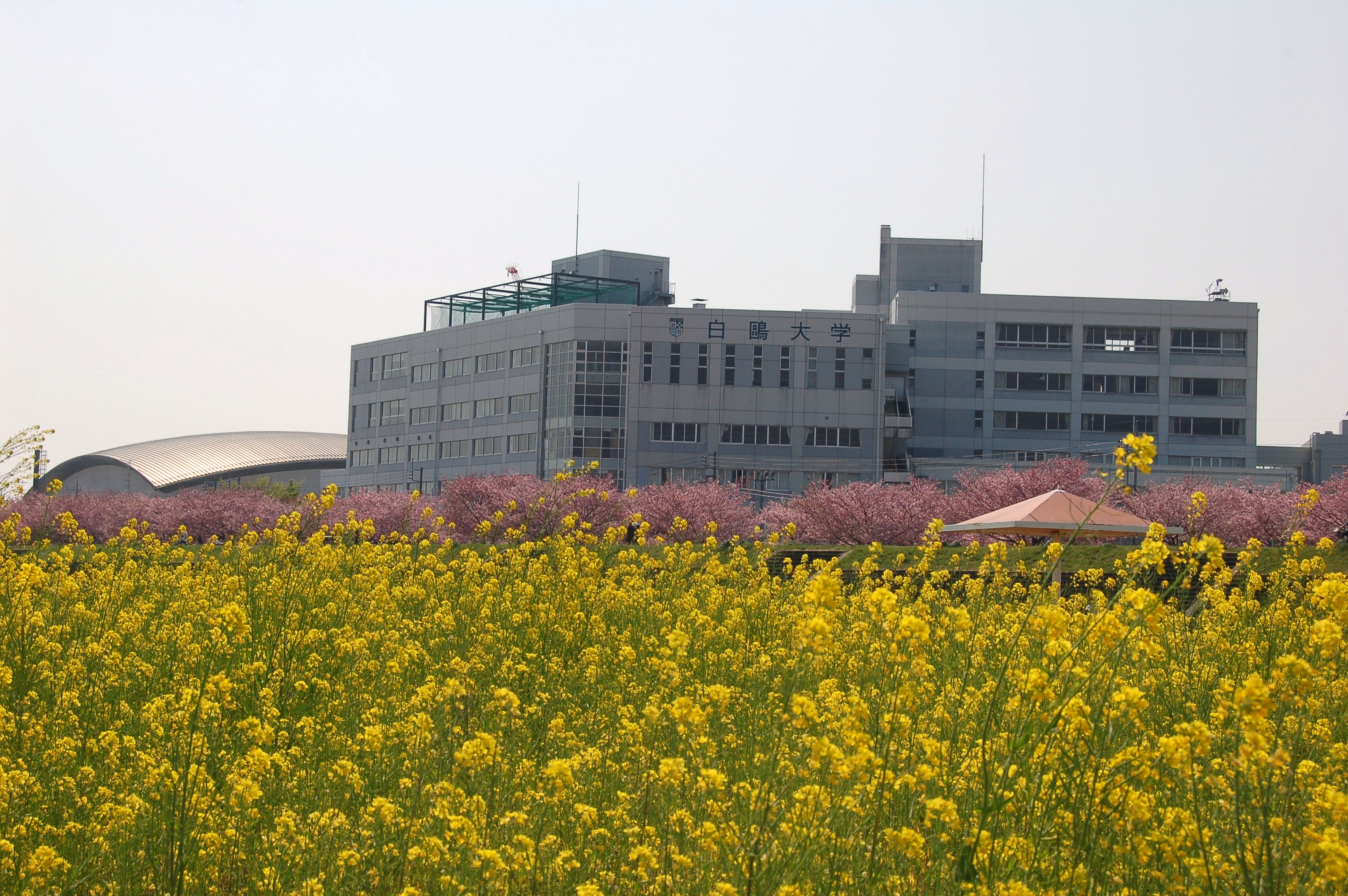
Main campus

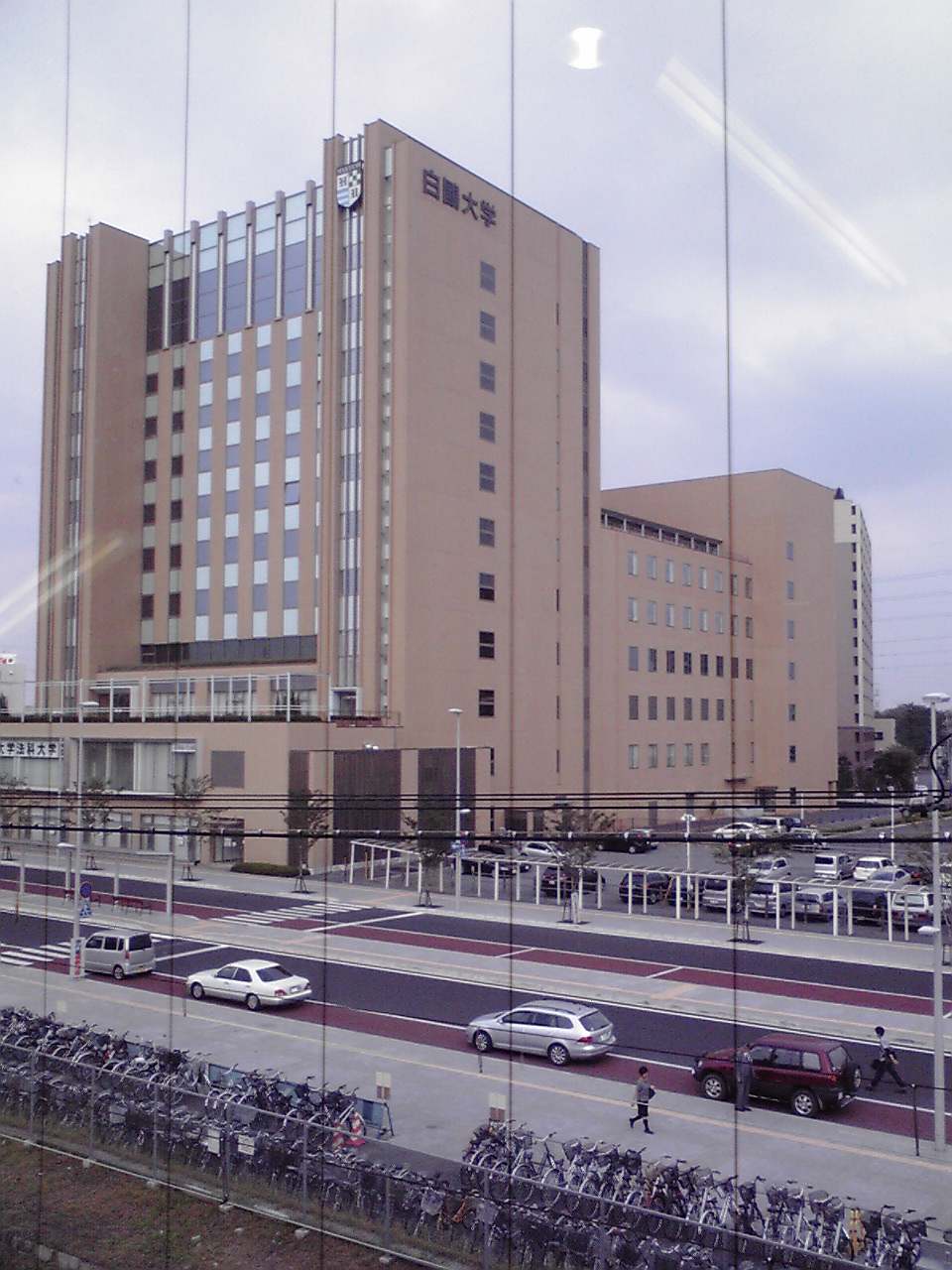
East campus

Hakuoh has two campuses: the Main Campus and the East Campus. The Main Campus is located to the west of the JR station in Oyama, Tochigi and includes: classic Mulberry Hall, the New Institute of Business Development, the computer Information Processing Education Centers; the three-tiered library with over 130,000 volumes in Japanese and 45,000 in western language, 350 classrooms in three five-story buildings, Memorial Hall gymnasium, a sports field, tennis courts, cafeterias, and dormitories on landscaped grounds.

The East Campus was founded in 2005 and is housed in an eleven-story building for the graduate Law School and the undergraduate Faculty of Law. It also has a Moot Court room, two libraries, and Hakuoh Hall.

== Annual schedule ==
- April - Opening ceremony, new student orientation, start of first semester
- May - Sports day
- June - Open campus, classes open to the public
- July - End of first semester, final exams, study abroad (US)
- August - Study abroad (Hawaii, China), summer vacation
- September - Study abroad (UK), start of second semester
- October - Hakuoh Festival
- November - Employment guidance
- December - English speech contest, Christmas party, winter vacation
- January - Second semester final exams
- February - End of second semester, spring vacation
- March - Graduation ceremony

== Organization ==
- Graduate School
  - MBA
  - MA Law
- Faculty of Business Management
  - International Management aims to provide students with a broad understanding of current and future trends in international business for medium-and-small firms through a study of the Asian, American, European, and Middle Eastern economies. Global management theory and language training enable students to develop a broad international business understanding.
  - Corporate Management
  - Information Management studies how to employ computers to gather, analyze, and adapt information for use by management. Basic subjects, such as statistics and mathematics, provide the foundation to advance organization management and corporate decision making.
  - Accounting Management expounds this ‘basic business language’ in three steps: (1) by mastering the basics of accounting and bookkeeping; (2) by intermediate bookkeeping, cost accounting, and financial accounting; and (3) by analyzing strategic accounting and international accounting.
  - Business Communications
- Faculty of Law
  - The International curriculum covers basic Japanese law as well as the legal relations and law of other countries closely related to Japan (such as China, Korea, Southeast Asian nations, America, Europe, and the Middle East) to search for solutions to legal dilemmas and arrive at mutually agreed upon global standards.
  - The Law curriculum covers the various specialized domestic legal fields, including intellectual property rights, environmental regulation, corporate accounting, financial transactions, administrative procedures, legal administration, and local government administration.
  - The Policymaking curriculum examines modern society from a policymaking and legal standpoint in order to analyze and evaluate decisionmaking.
- Faculty of Human Development
  - Child Education focuses on the especially important growth period from infancy through elementary school.
  - Health and Sports Science includes the fields of sports rehabilitation, sports coaching, sports medicine, and dance.
- Associate Degrees
  - Business Management provides training in bookkeeping, accounting, and computer skills.
  - Early Childhood Education provides preschool educators with the basics of education, language arts, psychology, and social welfare.
- Secondary/Kindergarten
  - Hakuoh University Ashikaga High School
  - Hakuoh University Ashikaga Junior High School
  - Hakuoh University Kindergarten
