= Surliyadin =

Indonesian basketball player

No. 52 – RANS Simba Bogor
- Position: Small forward
- League: IBL

Personal information
- Born: August 19, 1990 (age 36) Banda Aceh, Indonesia
- Listed height: 188 cm (6 ft 2 in)
- Listed weight: 80 kg (176 lb)

Career information
- High school: SMA BPI 1 (Bandung, West Java)
- Playing career: 2012–present

Career history
- 2012–2013: Garuda Bandung
- 2013–2016: JNE BSC Bandung Utama
- 2016–2021: Garuda Bandung/Prawira Bandung
- 2021–2025: Bali United Basketball
- 2025-present: RANS Simba Bogor
Medals
Men's 3x3 basketball
Representing Indonesia
Southeast Asian Games
Silver medal – second place	2019 Philippines	Team 3x3

Surliyadin Iton (born August 19, 1990) is an Indonesian professional basketball player for RANS Simba Bogor of the Indonesian Basketball League (IBL). He represented the Indonesia national team for the 2019 SEA Games 3X3.

He represented Indonesia's national basketball team at the 2016 SEABA Cup, where he recorded most minutes, points, assists and steals for his team.

== Career statistics ==
Legend
GP	Games played	GS	Games started	MPG	Minutes per game
FG%	Field goal percentage	3P%	3-point field goal percentage	FT%	Free throw percentage
RPG	Rebounds per game	APG	Assists per game	SPG	Steals per game
BPG	Blocks per game	PPG	Points per game	**Bold**	Career high

*	Led the league

=== NBL/IBL ===
==== Regular season ====
Years	Teams	GP	Min	FG%	3P%	FT%	APG	RPG	SPG	BPG	PPG
2012-13	Garuda Bandung	27	-	35.8	32.7	34.2	0.8	1.8	1.5	0.1	5.4
2013–2014	JNE Bandung Utama	31	-	33.4	28.6	46.9	2.1	4.5	2.1	0.3	11.9
2014–2015	JNE Bandung Utama	33	-	28.9	22.3	45.3	2.3	4.0	1.6	0.2	6.3
