= Perbanas Institute =

Indonesian tertiary school

- Former names: STIE Perbanas Jakarta; STIMIK Perbanas
- Motto in English: Envision Your Future Today
- Type: Private
- Established: 1969
- Rector: Prof. Dr. Ir. Hermanto Siregar, M.Ec. (2018 - Present)
- Location: South Jakarta, Jakarta, Indonesia; 6.2170845°S 106.8283877°E
- Colors: Blue, green, grey
- Sporting affiliations: LIMA
- Mascot: Rhinos
- Website: www.perbanas.id

Perbanas Institute is a tertiary school in South Jakarta, Jakarta, Indonesia. Founded on February 19, 1969, by the National General Banks Association (Perbanas), the institute focuses on banking, finance and informatics. Established to meet the needs of banking personnel, it was organized by the Banks Association Education Foundation (Yayasan Pendidikan Perbanas, or YPP).

== History ==
At first YPP organized higher education in the form of Perbanas Banking Academy (AIP) which later evolved into Perbanas Academy of Banking and Accounting (AAP) in 1982. Responding to the demands and needs of the market of educated workforce the institute has grown from the academy into college, namely Perbanas School of Economics in 1988 and on December 10, 1999, it opened Postgraduate Program in Management.

Based on the Minister of Higher Education decree No. 209/D/O2007, dated October 23, 2007, Perbanas School of Economics and Perbanas School of Computer Management and Informatics (STIMIK Perbanas) merged into Institute of Finance-Banking and Informatics Asia Perbanas (IKPIA Perbanas) or popularly known as Perbanas Institute.

== Schools and faculties ==
- Faculty of Economics and Business
- Faculty of Information Technology
- Graduate School

== Student organizations ==
- Student Representatives Council (MPM; Indonesian: Majelis Permusyawatan Mahasiswa)
- Student Executive Board (BEM; Indonesian: Badan Eksekutif Mahasiswa)
- Students' Association
- Radio Kampus (Internet)
- Sports
  - Basketball
  - Soccer and futsal
  - Baseball and softball
  - Taekwondo
  - Badminton
- Arts
  - Perbanas Institute Choir
  - Slide photography

== Achievements ==
- Indonesia's best School of management, 2014
  - IT dean Harya Damar Widiputra received the Higher Education Coordinating Board Region III Outstanding Lecturer award.
- Bachelor's honours-degree accounting and management programmes received an "A" accreditation from Indonesia's Ministry of Research, Technology and Higher Education.
- Bachelor's honours-degree accounting programme accredited by CPA Australia

=== Choir ===
- In ... Canto Sul Garda, 8th International Choir Competition Secular and Sacred Music in Riva del Garda, Italy, October 2009: Gold V Diploma (category winner) and best conductor for sacred music (mixed choir) and Gold VI Diploma for mixed-choir folksongs
- Bratislava Cantat I, 2015 International Choir Festival: Gold for a cappella sacred music, folksongs and adult choir
