= 2017–18 Indonesian Basketball League =

Indonesian basketball league season

- League: Indonesian Basketball League
- Sport: Basketball
- TV partner(s): iNews (Indonesia); Usee TV (Indonesia); Transvision (Indonesia) (only finals); Laola1.TV (worldwide, exclude Indonesia)

IBL Draft
- Top draft pick: De'Angelo Hamilton
- Picked by: Satya Wacana Salatiga

Regular season

2017–18 IBL Indonesia seasons
- ← 2017 2018–19 →

The 2017–18 Indonesian Basketball League was the third season of the Indonesian Basketball League with Starting5 as a promoter of the league. The second foreign player draft was held on October 2, 2017. The regular season began on December 8, 2017 and ended on February 25, 2018. The All-Star break was on January 7, 2018, and was held in Jakarta.

== Teams ==
Teams	Head Coach	Captain	Home	City
Satya Wacana Salatiga	(Indonesia) Efri Meldi	(Indonesia) Andre Adriano		Salatiga
Bimaperkasa Yogyakarta	(Indonesia) Raoul Miguel	(Indonesia) Yanuar Dwi Priasmoro	GOR UNY (3,000)	Yogyakarta
Hangtuah Sumatera Selatan	(Indonesia) Andika Saputra	(Indonesia) Kelly Purwanto		Palembang
NSH Jakarta	(Indonesia) Wahyu Widayat Jati			Jakarta
Siliwangi Bandung	(Indonesia) Ali Budimansyah		GOR C-Tra Arena (2,500)	Bandung
Garuda Bandung	(Indonesia) Andre Yuwadi	(Indonesia) Diftha Pratama	GOR C-Tra Arena (2,500)	Bandung
Pacific Caesar Surabaya	(Indonesia) Kencana Wukir	(Indonesia) Indra Mohammad	DBL Arena, Surabaya (3,000) GOR Pacific Caesar (2,000)	Surabaya
Stapac Jakarta	(Philippines) Bong Ramos	(Indonesia) Fandi Andika Ramadhani		Jakarta
Pelita Jaya Energi Mega Persada	(Indonesia) Johannis Winar	(Indonesia) Ponsianus Nyoman Indrawan	GOR Soemantri	Jakarta
Satria Muda Pertamina Jakarta	(Indonesia) Youbel Sondakh	(Indonesia) Christian Ronaldo Sitepu	BritAma Arena (4,000)	Jakarta

=== Satria Muda 2017–18 roster ===
Note: Flags indicate national team eligibility at FIBA-sanctioned events. Players may hold other non-FIBA nationalities not displayed.

Satria Muda Pertamina roster
Players
Coaches

Pos.	No.	Nat.	Name	Ht.
F	44	(United States)	Dior Lowhorn	2.01 m (6 ft 7 in)
F	71	(Indonesia)	Jamarr Johnson	1.96 m (6 ft 5 in)
G	2	(Indonesia)	Hardianus Lakudu	1.75 m (5 ft 9 in)
F	33	(Indonesia)	Arki Wisnu	1.88 m (6 ft 2 in)
F	30	(Indonesia)	Kevin Sitorus	1.96 m (6 ft 5 in)
G	11	(Indonesia)	Audy Arizanugra	1.76 m (5 ft 9 in)
F	8	(Indonesia)	Sandy Ibrahim Aziz	1.88 m (6 ft 2 in)
C	15	(Indonesia)	Christian Ronaldo Sitepu	2.01 m (6 ft 7 in)
F	35	(Indonesia)	Juan Laurent	1.93 m (6 ft 4 in)
F	21	(Indonesia)	Muhammad Rizal Falconi	1.95 m (6 ft 5 in)
F	1	(Indonesia)	Laurentius Oei	1.95 m (6 ft 5 in)
G	23	(Indonesia)	Avan Seputra	1.90 m (6 ft 3 in)
C	50	(Indonesia)	Muhammad Diya'ul Haq	2.01 m (6 ft 7 in)
G	0	(Indonesia)	Christian Gunawan	1.76 m (5 ft 9 in)

Head coach

- (Indonesia) Youbel Sondakh

Legend

- (C) Team captain
- (HP) Heritage player
- (R) Rookie
- Injured

- Roster
Updated: 11 January 2024,

== Transactions ==
Name	Old club	New club	Status
(Indonesia) Mei Joni	Hang Tuah Sumatra Selatan	Aspac Jakarta	Free
(Indonesia) Christian Gunawan	Pelita Harapan University	Satria Muda Pertamina	Free
(Indonesia) Steven Ray	Pelita Harapan University	Satya Wacana Salatiga	Free
(Indonesia) Hendry Cornelius Lakay	SMA John 23 Merauke	Satya Wacana Salatiga	Free
(Indonesia) Yanuar	Hang Tuah Sumatra Selatan	Bima Perkasa Yogyakarta	Free
(Indonesia) Melkisedek Basik Basik	Garuda Bandung	Bima Perkasa Yogyakarta	Free
(Indonesia) Francesco Yogi Da Silva	Pelita Jaya MP	Bima Perkasa Yogyakarta	Free
(Indonesia) Hans Abraham	CLS Knights Surabaya	Garuda Bandung	Free
(Indonesia) Valentino Wuwungan	Aspac Jakarta	Pelita Jaya MP	Free
(Indonesia) Raymond Shariputra	Aspac Jakarta	Garuda Bandung	Free
(Indonesia) Gabriel Batistuta	Garuda Bandung	Pelita Jaya MP	Free
(Indonesia) Frida Aris	Retired	Bima Perkasa Yogyakarta	Free
(Indonesia) Xaverius Prawiro	Retired	Pelita Jaya MP	Free
(Indonesia) (United States) Brandon Jawato	Pelita Jaya MP	Free Agent	Free
(Indonesia) Hiro Londa	CLS Knight Surabaya	Free Agent	Free
(Indonesia) Gege Nagata	Free Agent	Pacific Caesar Surabaya	Free
(Indonesia) Fadlan Minallah	HangTuah Sumatra Selatan	Siliwangi Bandung	Free
(Indonesia) Yerikho Tuasela	CLS Knight Surabaya	Pacific Caesar	Free
(Indonesia) Rizky Liandra	Aspac Jakarta	Siliwangi Bandung	Free
(Indonesia) Azzarian Praditya	NSH Jakarta	Siliwangi Bandung	Free

== Draft lottery ==
The 2017 IBL draft lottery was held on October 2.

Team	Lottery chances	Lottery probabilities				
Team	Lottery chances	1st	2nd	3nd	4nd	5nd
Satya Wacana Salatiga	1–14	0.50	0.25	0.25		
Bima Perkasa Yogjakarta	2–12	0.25	0.25	0.25	0.25	
Siliwangi Bandung	4–10	0.15	0.15	0.15	0.10	
NSH Jakarta	6–9	0.05	0.10	0.10	0.25	0.50
Hangtuah Sumatera Selatan	6–9	0.05	0.10	0.10	0.25	0.50

=== Draft selections ===
==== First round ====
Round	Pick	Name	Nationality	Pos	University	Previous club	Club
1	1	De'Angelo Hamilton*	United States	PF/C	Washington State University	(Vietnam) Cantho Catfish	Satya Wacana Salatiga
1	2	Emilio Park	United States	PF/C	Johnson C. Smith University	(Luxembourg) Bascharage	Bimaperkasa Yogyakarta
1	3	George Nashon	United States	PF	University of Idaho	Free agent	Hangtuah Sumatera Selatan
1	4	Dominic Woodson*	United States	C	University of Tennessee	(United States) Rochester Razorsharks	NSH Jakarta
1	5	Anthony Jones*	United States	C	Baylor University	Free agent	Siliwangi Bandung
1	6	Roderick Flemings	United States	SF	University of Hawaii	(Finland) FoKoPo	Garuda Bandung
1	7	David Seagers	United States	PG	Dowling College	(Indonesia) Pacific Caesar Surabaya	Pacific Caesar Surabaya
1	8	Dominique Williams	United States	PG	Central Washington University	(Indonesia) Aspac Jakarta	Aspac Jakarta
1	9	Wayne Bradford	United States	PG	Davenport University	Free agent	Pelita Jaya Energi Mega Persada
1	10	Kevin Bridgewaters	United States	PG	University of Tennessee at Chattanooga	(Qatar) Al-Khor	Satria Muda Pertamina Jakarta

==== Second round ====
Round	Pick	Name	Nationality	Pos	University	Previous club	Club
2	1	Madarious Gibbs	United States	G	Texas Southern	Free agent	Satya Wacana Salatiga
2	2	Anthony McDonald	United States	G	North Carolina Central	(Gabon) Libreville ID	Bimaperkasa Yogyakarta
2	3	Keenan Palmore	United States	G	Lenoir–Rhyne University	(United States) Georgia Spartans	Hangtuah Sumatera Selatan
2	4	Brachon Griffin	United States/Germany	G	Elizabeth City University	(Italy) Capo d'Orlando Basket	NSH Jakarta
2	5	Willie Kemp (basketball)*	United States	G	Memphis	(Kosovo) Sigal Prishtina	Siliwangi Bandung
2	6	Ashton Gibbs*	United States	G	Pittsburgh	(United States) Fort Wayne Mad Ants (NBA-DLeague)	Garuda Bandung
2	7	Kavon Lytch	United States	F	Oklahoma City Stars	(Dominican Republic) Sameji	Pacific Caesar Surabaya
2	8	Nate Barfield	United States	F	Langston University	(Thailand) OSK R. Airlines	Aspac Jakarta
2	9	Merril Holden*	United States	F	Iowa State	Al-Bahrain	Pelita Jaya Energi Mega Persada
2	10	Dior Lowhorn	United States	C	San Francisco	(Philippines) Rain or Shine Elasto Painters	Satria Muda Pertamina Jakarta

==== *Player switch for undrafted ====
Round	Pick	Original Pick	Substitute	Nationality	Pos	University	Previous club	Club
1	1	De'Angelo Hamilton*	Jontaveous Sulton	United States	F	Middle Tennessee State University	(Luxembourg) BBC Nitia	Satya Wacana Salatiga
2	5	Willie Kemp (basketball)*	Darnell Brown	United States	G	Southeastern Oklahoma STate	(United States) San Francisco Pro Am	Siliwangi Bandung
1	5	Anthony Jones*	Donovan Hastings	Canada	F	University of New Brunswick	Free agent	Siliwangi Bandung
2	9	Merril Holden*	Chester Jarrel Giles	United States	C	Oregon State University	(Saudi Arabia) Al-Ahli	Pelita Jaya EMP
2	6	Ashton Gibbs	Devin Matthews	United States	G	Central Washington University	(Kosovo) KB Ylli	Garuda Bandung
1	4	Dominic Woodson	Whyle Dennison Marshall	United States	C	University of Tennessee		NSH Jakarta
2	7	Kavon Lytch	Michael D'Andre Fey	United States	C	UCLA	(Thailand) Dunkin' Raptors (TBL)	Pacific Caesar Surabaya
1	10	Kevin Bridgewaters	Jamarr Johnson	United States/ Indonesia	PF	Widener University	(Thailand) Dunkin' Raptors (TBL)	Satria Muda Pertamina Jakarta
–	–	Donovan Hastings	Joel Every Clarke	United States	C	Huston–Tillotson University	(Philippines) Kabayan Philipinas (TBSL)	Siliwangi Bandung
–	–	Whyle Dennison Marshall	Jason Bryant Carter	United States	C	Ole Miss	(Vietnam) Hanoi Bulls (TBSL)	NSH Jakarta
–	–	Devin Matthews	Gary Jacobs Jr	United States	PG	Central Washington University	(Indonesia) NSH Jakarta	Garuda Bandung

== Foreign players ==
Teams	Foreign 1	Foreign 2	Replaced During Season
Satya Wacana Salatiga	(United States) Jontaveous Sulton	(United States) Madarious Gibbs	(United States) De'Angelo Hamilton
Bimaperkasa Yogyakarta	(United States) Emilio Park	(United States) Anthony McDonald	
Hangtuah Sumatera Selatan	(United States) George Nashon	(United States) Keenan Palmore	
NSH Jakarta	(United States) Jason Bryant Carter	(United States) (Germany) Brachon Griffin	(United States) Dominic Woodson (United States) Whyle Dennison Marshall
Siliwangi Bandung	(United States) Darnell Brown II	(United States) Joel Every Clarke	(Canada) Donovan Hastings (United States) Anthony Jones (United States) Willie Kemp
Garuda Bandung	(United States) Roderick Flemings	(United States) Gary Jacobs Jr	(United States) Ashton Gibbs (United States) Devin Matthews
Pacific Caesar Surabaya	(United States) David Seagers	(United States) Anton Davon Waters	(United States) Kavon Lytch (United States) Michael D'Andre Fey
Aspac Jakarta	(United States) Dominique Williams	(United States) Kore White	(United States) Nate Barfield
Pelita Jaya Energi Mega Persada	(United States) Wayne Bradford	(United States) (Bahrain) C. J. Giles	(United States) Merril Holden
Satria Muda Pertamina Jakarta	(United States) (Indonesia) Jamarr Johnson	(United States) Dior Lowhorn	(United States) Kevin Bridgewaters

== Rookie players ==
Teams	Rookie 1	Rookie 2	Rookie 3	Rookie 4	Rookie 5
Satya Wacana Salatiga	(Indonesia) Henry Cornelis Lakay				
Bimaperkasa Yogyakarta	(Indonesia) Adree Sukmana	(Indonesia) Lamhot Simanjuntak	(Indonesia) Handoyo Saputro		
Hangtuah Sumatera Selatan	(Indonesia) Abraham Wenas	(Indonesia) Riggs Parieri			
NSH Jakarta	(Indonesia) Andre Rorimpandey	(Indonesia) Rendi Mantiri	(Indonesia) Najabbudin Anwar	(Indonesia) Farhans Hariz	
Siliwangi Bandung	(Indonesia) Kevin Moses Poetiray	(Indonesia) Aditya Lumanauw	(Indonesia) Fredy Bachtiar	(Indonesia) Fisyaiful Amir	(Indonesia) Muh Yugie
Garuda Bandung	(Indonesia) Muhammad Reza Guntara	(Indonesia) Pandu Wiguna	(Indonesia) Raay Danny		
Pacific Caesar Surabaya	(Indonesia) Yonatan Kae				
Aspac Jakarta	(Indonesia) Brandon Kosegaran	(Indonesia) Agassi Goantara			
Pelita Jaya Energi Mega Persada	(Indonesia) Reggie Mononimbar	(Indonesia) Kharis Agung	(Indonesia) Govinda Julian Saputra		
Satria Muda Pertamina Jakarta	(Indonesia) Christian Gunawan				

== Series hosts ==
=== Initial schedule ===
Series 1: Jakarta// 8–10 December 2017

Series 2: Bandung// 15–17 December 2017

Series 3: Semarang// 22–24 December 2017

Series 4: Yogyakarta// 5–7 January 2018

All-Star: Yogyakarta// 13–14 January 2018

Series 5: Solo// 19–21 January 2018

Series 6: Malang// 26–28 January 2018

Series 7: Surabaya// 2–4 February 2018

Series 8: Cirebon// 23–25 February 2018

=== New schedule ===
Due to delay in Jakarta series venue renovation, a new schedule has been released for the upcoming season.

Series 1: Semarang// 8–10 December 2017 – GOR Sahabat

Series 2: Bandung// 15–17 December 2017 – GOR C-Tra Arena

Series 3: Solo// 23–25 December 2017 – Sritex Arena

Series 4: Jakarta// 4–6 January 2018 – BritAma Arena

All-Star: Jakarta// 7 January 2018

Series 5: Surabaya// 19–21 January 2018 – DBL Arena

Series 6: Yogyakarta// 26–28 January 2018 – GOR UNY( Yogyakarta State University)

Series 7: Cirebon// 2–4 February 2018 – GMC Basketball Arena

Series 8: Malang// 23–25 February 2018 – GOR Bimasakti

== Regular season ==
Red Division
Teams	W	L	P	Notes
s Satria Muda Pertamina Jakarta	15	2	17	Play-off Semi-finals
x Garuda Bandung	9	8	17	Play-Off First round
x Hangtuah Sumatera Selatan	7	10	17	Play-Off First round
Bimaperkasa Yogyakarta	6	11	17	
NSH Jakarta	3	14	17	

White Division
Teams	W	L	P	Notes
s Pelita Jaya Energi Mega Persada	16	1	17	Play-off Semi-finals
x Aspac Jakarta	12	5	17	Play-Off First round
x Pacific Caesar Surabaya	11	6	17	Play-Off First round
Satya Wacana Salatiga	6	11	17	
Siliwangi Bandung	0	17	17	

Notes:

s Semi-finals

x First round

== Statistics ==
=== Individual game highs ===
Name	Club	Category	Statistic
(United States) Brachon Griffin	NSH Jakarta	Point	50
(Indonesia) Rionny Rahangmetan	Satya Wacana Salatiga	Assist	13
(United States) Jontaveous Sulton	Satya Wacana Salatiga	Rebounds	24
(United States) Whyle Dennison Marshall	NSH Jakarta	Steals	5
(United States) Devin Matthews	Garuda Bandung	Steals	5
(United States) Wayne Bradford	Pelita Jaya Energi Mega Persada	Steals	5
(United States) Roderick Flemings	Garuda Bandung	Blocks	3
(United States) Emilio Park	Bimaperkasa Yogyakarta	Blocks	3
(United States) Jontaveous Sulton	Satya Wacana Salatiga	Blocks	3
(United States) Madarious Gibbs	Satya Wacana Salatiga	Three Pointers	8

=== Individual statistic ===
Point Per Games
Name	Club	PPG	Games
(United States) Madarious Gibbs	Satya Wacana Salatiga	27.01	14
(United States) (Germany) Brachon Griffin	NSH Jakarta	25.79	14
(United States) Gary Jacobs Jr	Garuda Bandung	25.29	7
(United States) Darnell Brown II	Siliwangi Bandung	24.67	12
(United States) David Seagers	Pacific Caesar Surabaya	22.69	13

Rebounds Per Games
Name	Club	RPG	Games
(United States) Jontaveous Sulton	Satya Wacana Salatiga	17.57	14
(United States) Anton Davon Waters	Pacific Caesar Surabaya	17.00	6
(Bahrain) C. J. Giles	Pelita Jaya Energi Mega Persada	14.43	14
(United States) Roderick Flemings	Garuda Bandung	14.00	14
(United States) Jason Bryant Carter	NSH Jakarta	14.00	10

Assists Per Games
Name	Club	APG	Games
(United States) David Seagers	Pacific Caesar Surabaya	7.62	13
(United States) Madarious Gibbs	Satya Wacana Salatiga	5.21	14
(Indonesia) Rionny Rahangmetan	Satya Wacana Salatiga	5.13	15
(United States) Keenan Palmore	Hangtuah Sumatera Selatan	4.80	15
(United States) Dominique Williams	Aspac Jakarta	4.79	14

== Individual awards ==
Most Valuable Player : Xaverius Prawiro (Pelita Jaya Energi Mega Persada)

Foreign Player of the Year : David Seagers (Pacific Caesar Surabaya)

Most Inspiration Young Player of the Year : Henry Cornelis Lakay (Satya Wacana Salatiga)

Rookie of the Year : Abraham Wenas (Hangtuah Sumatera Selatan)

Coach of the Year : Kencana Wukir (Pacific Caesar Surabaya)

Defensive Player of the Year : C. J. Giles (Pelita Jaya Energi Mega Persada)

Sixthman of the Year : Andakara Prastawa (Aspac Jakarta)

Most Improve Player of the Year : Nuke Tri Saputra (Pacific Caesar Surabaya)

All-Indonesian Team

1. Xaverius Prawiro SG (Pelita Jaya Energi Mega Persada)
2. Abraham Damar Grahita SG (Aspac Jakarta)
3. Respati Ragil SG (Pelita Jaya Energi Mega Persada)
4. Christian Ronaldo Sitepu C (Satria Muda Pertamina Jakarta)
5. Arki Dikania Wisnu SF (Satria Muda Pertamina Jakarta)

First team Rookie

1. Abraham Wenas PG (Hangtuah Sumatera Selatan)
2. Andre Rorimpandey SG (NSH Jakarta)
3. Kevin Moses Poetiray PF (Siliwangi Bandung)
4. Fredy Bactiar SG/SF (Siliwangi Bandung)
5. Muhammad Reza Guntara C (Garuda Bandung)

== All-Star Games ==
=== Pre-game ===
Skill-challenge champion : (Indonesia) Nuke Tri Saputra (Pacific Caesar Surabaya)

Three-point contest champion : (Indonesia) Andakara Prastawa (Stapac Jakarta)

Slam-dunk contest champion : (United States) George Nashon (Hangtuah Sumatera Selatan)

=== Game ===
==== Red Team ====
Pos	Name	Club	No. of selections
Starters
G	Hardianus Lakudu	Satria Muda Pertamina Jakarta	1
G	(United States) Keenan Palmore	Hangtuah Sumatera Selatan	1
F	Arki Dikania Wisnu	Satria Muda Pertamina Jakarta	2
F	Christian Ronaldo Sitepu	Satria Muda Pertamina Jakarta	2
C	(United States) Dior Lowhorn	Satria Muda Pertamina Jakarta	1
Reserves
G	Avan Seputra	Satria Muda Pertamina Jakarta	1
F	Yanuar Dwi Priasmoro	Bimaperkasa Yogyakarta	1
F	Surliyadin	Garuda Bandung	1
F	(United States) George Nashon	Hangtuah Sumatera Selatan	1
G	(United States) Anthony McDonald	Bimaperkasa Yogyakarta	1

==== White Team ====
Pos	Name	Club	No. of selections
Starters
G	(United States) David Seagers	Pacific Caesar Surabaya	1
G	Abraham Damar Grahita	Aspac Jakarta	2
F	Xaverius Prawiro	Pelita Jaya	1
F	Ponsianus Nyoman Indrawan	Pelita Jaya	2
C	(United States) C.J. Giles	Pelita Jaya	1
Reserves
C	Adhi Pratama	Pelita Jaya	1
F	Indra Muhamad	Pacific Caesar Surabaya	1
G	Respati Ragil	Pelita Jaya	1
G	(United States) Wayne Bradford	Pelita Jaya	1
C	(United States) Jontaveous Sulton	Satya Wacana Salatiga	1

iNews

January 7, 2018
4:00 pm WIB

Team Red 114, Team White 130
Scoring by quarter: 27–31, 30–30, 32–36, 25–33

Mahaka Square, Jakarta, Indonesia
Attendance: 2,000

==== All-Star MVP ====
Country	MVP	Team
(United States)	C.J. Giles	Pelita Jaya

== Playoffs ==
=== First round Red Division ===
Team	Score	Team	Games	Stadium
Hangtuah Sumatera Selatan	76–74 (1–0)	Garuda Bandung	1	C-tra Arena Bandung
Garuda Bandung	73–69 (1–1)	Hangtuah Sumatera Selatan	2	C-tra Arena Bandung
Garuda Bandung	59–64 (1–2)	Hangtuah Sumatera Selatan	3	C-tra Arena Bandung

=== Semi-final Red Division ===
Team	Score	Team	Games	Stadium
Hangtuah Sumatera Selatan	88–97 (0–1)	Satria Muda Pertamina Jakarta	1	Hi-Test Arena Batam
Satria Muda Pertamina Jakarta	60–69 (1–1)	Hangtuah Sumatera Selatan	2	Britama Arena
Satria Muda Pertamina Jakarta	78–56 (2–1)	Hangtuah Sumatera Selatan	3	Britama Arena

=== First round White Division ===
Team	Score	Team	Games	Stadium
Pacific Caesar Surabaya	69–77 (0–1)	Aspac Jakarta	1	DBL Arena Surabaya
Aspac Jakarta	W/o (2–0)	Pacific Caesar Surabaya	2	DBL Arena Surabaya
Aspac Jakarta	DNP	Pacific Caesar Surabaya	3	DBL Arena Surabaya

=== Semi-final White Division ===
Team	Score	Team	Games	Stadium
Aspac Jakarta	69–58 (1–0)	Pelita Jaya	1	GOR UNY Yogyakarta
Pelita Jaya	73–60 (1–1)	Aspac Jakarta	2	C-tra Arena Bandung
Pelita Jaya	77–76 (OT) (2–1)	Aspac Jakarta	3	C-tra Arena Bandung

== IBL Finals ==
Team	Score	Team	Games	Stadium	Point	Assist	Rebs	Steal	Block	MVP Games
Pelita Jaya	63–73 (0–1)	Satria Muda Pertamina Jakarta	1	Britama Arena						
Satria Muda Pertamina Jakarta	78–94 (1–1)	Pelita Jaya	2	Gor Mahasiswa Soemantri Brojonegoro						
Pelita Jaya	64–69 (1–2)	Satria Muda Pertamina Jakarta	3	Gor Mahasiswa Soemantri Brojonegoro						
