= Indra Muhamad =

Indonesian basketball player

Pelita Jaya
- Position: Shooting guard / small forward
- League: IBL

Personal information
- Born: 23 December 1994 (age 31) Bandung, Indonesia
- Listed height: 189 cm (6 ft 2 in)
- Listed weight: 82 kg (181 lb)

Career information
- Playing career: 2014–present

Career history
- 2014-2020: Pacific Caesar
- 2020-2022: Bima Perkasa Jogja
- 2022-2024: Prawira Bandung
- 2024-2026: Kesatria Bengawan Solo
- 2026-present: Pelita Jaya Jakarta

Career highlights
- IBL champion (2023); IBL Three-point Contest champion (2022); All-IBL Indonesian Third Team (2020); IBL Defensive Player of the Year (2020); IBL All-Star (2018)

Indra Muhamad (born December 23, 1994) is an Indonesian professional basketball player for Pelita Jaya Basketball Club of the Indonesian Basketball League (IBL). Indra is known for his slam-dunk finishes.

== Professional career ==
At Pacific Caesar, Indra won the Defensive Player of the Year award in 2020. Indra's defensive stats that season are impressive. He recorded 3.38 RPG, 0.15 BPG, and 1.62 SPG, resulting in a 112-point efficiency. He beat two other candidates, Cassiopeia Manuputty and Galank Gunawan. The assessment results from 15 media representatives listed Indra as the winner with a score of 124, two points ahead of Galank, while Cassiopeia earned a score of 84.

Indra joined Prawira Bandung in the 2023 season, when the team was in top form. Indra became Prawira's secret weapon on the second line, averaging 4.1 PPG and 2.4 RPG in 30 regular season games. He then contributed 1.7 points and 1.3 rebounds per game in six playoff games. He continued to play in the 2024 season, where his role was reduced. However, Indra still contributed 2.9 points and 2.1 rebounds in the regular season. In the playoffs, Indra played less than 10 minutes in five games. Indra has always had excellent three-point shooting skills.

On December 20, 2024, Indra joins Kesatria Bengawan Solo, joining his former teammate at Pacific Caesar, Nuke Tri Saputra.

== National team career ==
On February 14, 2022, Indra was called up by the Indonesia national team and Rajko Toroman, for their training camp, preparation for the 2023 FIBA Basketball World Cup qualification.
