= Yudha Saputera =

Indonesian basketball player

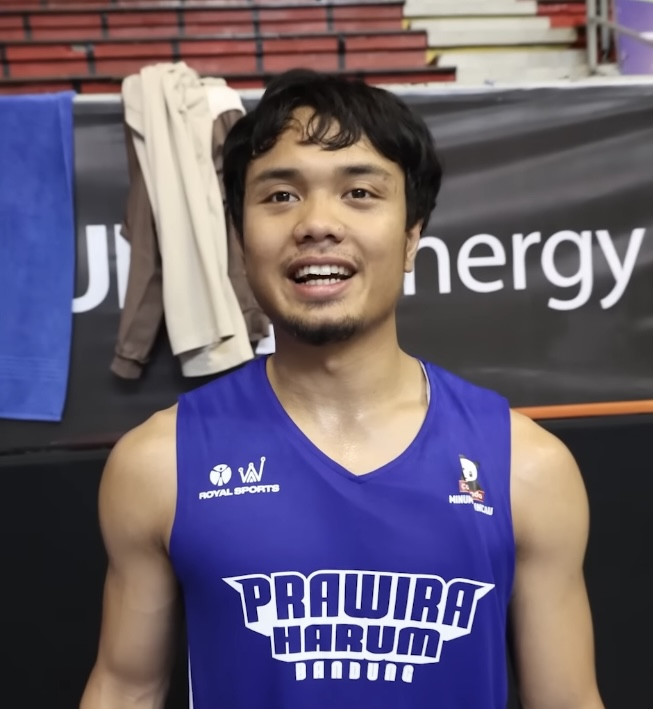
- Yudha in 2024

No. 8 – Satria Muda Bandung
- Position: Point guard
- League: IBL

Personal information
- Born: 21 November 1998 (age 27) Cirebon, Indonesia
- Listed height: 173 cm (5 ft 8 in)
- Listed weight: 70 kg (154 lb)

Career information
- High school: SMAN 2 (Cirebon, Indonesia)
- College: ITHB
- Playing career: 2020–present

Career history
- 2020: Prawira Bandung
- 2020-2021: →Indonesia Patriots
- 2021-2025: Prawira Bandung
- 2025-present: Satria Muda Bandung

Career highlights
- IBL champion (2023); 2× IBL All-Star Local MVP (2023, 2026); 5× IBL All-Star (2022-2026); IBL Defensive Player of the Year (2026); IBL All-Star Most Favorite Player (2026); All-IBL Local Defensive Team (2025); IBL Three-Point Contest champion (2023); IBL Rookie of the Year (2022); 4× All-IBL Indonesian First Team (2022-2026); All-IBL Rookie Team (2021); IBL Most Inspiring Young Player (2021); LIMA Champion (2019)
Medals
Men's basketball
Representing Indonesia
SEA Games
| Gold medal – first place | 2021 Vietnam | Team |
| Bronze medal – third place | 2025 Thailand | Team |

Yudha Saputera (born November 21, 1998) is an Indonesian professional basketball player for the Satria Muda Bandung of the Indonesian Basketball League (IBL). He played college basketball for ITHB Arrows of the Liga Mahasiswa (LIMA), where he won the championship in 2019.

== Early career ==
Saputera's carrier starts off from Pekan Olahraga Kota (Popkota). After that, he was trusted to represent the city of Cirebon in Pekan Olahraga Daerah (Porda) in 2014 and 2018. Saputera was also a key player for the province of West Java in the Pekan Olahraga Nasional (PON) in 2016 and 2021. In his youth years, he played for Generasi Muda Cirebon (GMC).

== Professional career ==
=== 2020-present ===
After completing his stint of career with Indonesia Patriots, in 2022 he signed with Prawira Bandung as the projected future point guard for the team. In his first year, he was paired with another guard Abraham Damar Grahita. They managed to reach semi-final before falling short to Satria Muda Pertamina. His performance in the 2022 IBL season with the Prawira Bandung, caught the attention of Miloš Pejić the coach of the national team. As the main guard for the team, working alongside Brandone Francis and Jarred Shaw, they managed to lead Prawira Bandung to their first championship since 1998. On March 2, 2024, Saputera achieved a career high, scoring 1.000 points in the IBL.

== National team career ==
He has been a member of Indonesia's national basketball team at several occasions such as the 2022 FIBA Asia Cup, and Indonesia's first ever basketball gold medal in the 2021 SEA Games. In the 2024 FIBA Pre-Qualifying Olympic, Saputera averaged 14.0 PPG, 6.0 APG, and 4.4 RBG.
