= 2023 Indonesian Basketball League =

2023 IBL Tokopedia
- League: Indonesian Basketball League
- Sport: Basketball
- Duration: 4–13 November 2022 (pre-season); 14 January – 24 June 2023 (regular season); 13–30 August 2023 (playoffs)
- TV partner(s): Moji (free-to-air); Usee Sports (IPTV); Vidio (streaming)

2022 IBL Draft
- Top draft pick: Victor Jacob Emillio Lobbu
- Picked by: Bima Perkasa Jogja

Regular season
- Top seed: Prawira Bandung
- Season MVP: Kaleb Ramot Gemilang
- Top scorer: Brandone Francis

Playoffs
- Finals champions: Prawira Bandung
- Runners-up: Pelita Jaya Bakrie
- Finals MVP: Muhammad Reza Guntara

IBL Indonesia seasons
- ← 2022 2024 →

The 2023 Indonesian Basketball League (known as IBL Tokopedia for sponsorship reasons) was the eighth season of the Indonesian top domestic basketball league, the Indonesian Basketball League, since the re-branding by Starting5. This season marked the 20th Anniversary of the IBL indonesia since its establishment in 2003.

From 2023, the divisions were abolished and therefore, each team has two matches against each other with a total of 30 games per team (240 season games). The playoff teams will be selected from the top 8 and the format is home and away. The preseason IBL Indonesia Cup returned in November after three year hiatus and Pelita Jaya Bakrie won the cup beating Satria Muda Pertamina. After playing 30 games for this season, Prawira Bandung finished top of the table and they faced the number eight, Borneo in the quarter final. They won the Finals after beating Pelita Jaya Bakrie 2-0 in home-away clashes. M. Fahdani Guntara won the Finals MVP after powering Prawira Bandung to the Finals with PPG of 15.5, RPG 8.0, APG 1.0.

== Schedule and location ==
Phase	Round	Date	Arena
Regular season	Series I	14 - 21 January 2023	GOR Merpati Denpasar, Bali
Regular season	Series II	28 January - 4 February 2023	GOR Bimasakti, Malang
Regular season	Series III	11–18 February 2023	DBL Arena, Surabaya
Regular season	Series IV	25 February - 4 March 2023	Sritex Arena, Solo
Regular season	Series V	11–18 March 2023	Knights Stadium, Semarang
All Star		19 March 2023	Knights Stadium, Semarang
Regular season	Series VI	24–31 May 2023	GOR Among Rogo, Yogyakarta
Regular season	Series VII	4–11 June 2023	C-Tra Arena, Bandung
Regular season	Series VIII	17–24 June 2023	Britama Arena, Kelapa Gading, Jakarta
Playoffs (Best-of-three)	First Round	30 June-8 July 2023	Home and Away
Playoffs (Best-of-three)	Semi-finals	13-15 July 2023	Home and Away
Playoffs (Best-of-three)	Finals	20-22 July 2023	Home and Away

Locations of 2023 IBL season.
Red: Red Region; White: White Region; Blue: Series location;

=== Homebase ===
Teams	Home	Club City
RJ Amartha Hangtuah	Margasatwa Basketball Court	Jakarta
Bali United Basketball	GOR Praja Raksasa Kepaon	Denpasar
Bima Perkasa Jogja	Among Rogo Sports Hall	Yogyakarta
Bumi Borneo Pontianak	GOR Pangsuma	Pontianak
Dewa United Banten	Sritex Arena	Banten
Evos Thunder Bogor	GOR Laga Tangkas	Bogor
Indonesia Patriots	Hall A Senayan	Jakarta
NSH Mountain Gold Timika	GOR MSC	Timika
Elang Pacific Caesar Surabaya	GOR Pacific Caesar	Surabaya
Pelita Jaya Bakrie	GOR Soemantri Brodjonegoro	Jakarta
Prawira Harum Bandung	C-Tra Arena	Bandung
RANS PIK Basketball	RANS Prestige Sportainment	Jakarta
Satria Muda Pertamina	The BritAma Arena	Jakarta
Satya Wacana Saints Salatiga	GOR Sahabat	Salatiga
Tangerang Hawks	Indoor Stadium, Sports Center	Tangerang
West Bandits Solo	Sritex Arena	Solo

== Personnel and kits ==
Teams	Manager	Head coach	Captain	Kit manufacturer
RJ Amartha Hangtuah	(Indonesia) Leonardo Niki	(Indonesia) Antonius Ferry Rinaldo	(Indonesia) Gunawan	(Indonesia) Injers
Bali United	(Indonesia) Sugiantoro	(England) Anthony Garbelotto	(Indonesia) Ponsianus Nyoman	(Indonesia) Specs
Bumi Borneo Pontianak	(Indonesia) Rendy Putrama	(Indonesia) Tondi R. Syailendra	(Indonesia) Wisnu Saputra	(Indonesia) FTW
Bima Perkasa Jogja	(Indonesia) Fransisca Juniati	(Indonesia) Efri Meldi	(Indonesia) Nuke Tri Saputra	(Indonesia) VNY
Dewa United Banten	(Indonesia) Zaki Iskandar	(Argentina) Santiago Rimoldi (caretaker)	(Indonesia) Kaleb Ramot Gemilang	(Indonesia) Mills
Evos Thunder Bogor	(Indonesia) Iwan Murryawan	(Indonesia) Andre Yuwadi	(Indonesia) Cassiopeia Manuputty	(Indonesia) Nakara
Indonesia Patriots	(Indonesia) Jamin Mattotoran	(Serbia) Miloš Pejić	(Indonesia) Anthony Beane	(Indonesia) One Stop
NSH Mountain Gold Timika	(Indonesia) Yusuf Arlan Ruslim	(Indonesia) Agus Pamungkas Batbual	(Indonesia) Randika Aprilian	(Indonesia) Injers
Elang Pacific Caesar Surabaya	(Indonesia) Dean Julyanto	(Indonesia) Oei A. Kiat	(Indonesia) Gregorio Claudio Wibowo	(Indonesia) Terra
Pelita Jaya Bakrie	(Indonesia) Nugroho Budi Cahyono	(Serbia) Đorđe Jovičić	(Indonesia) Andakara Dhyaksa	(Indonesia) Nakara
Prawira Harum Bandung	(Indonesia) Andi S. Octaranes	(United States) David Singleton	(Indonesia) Muhammad Reza Guntara	(Indonesia) Sportama
RANS PIK Basketball	(Indonesia) Alvin Indra	(Indonesia) Bambang Asdianto Pribadi	(Indonesia) Januar Kuntara	(Indonesia) Juara
Satria Muda Pertamina	(Indonesia) Riska Natalia Dewi	(Indonesia) Youbel Sondakh	(Indonesia) Hardianus Lakudu	(Indonesia) Juara
Satya Wacana Saints Salatiga	(Indonesia) Martin Setyawan	(Indonesia) Jerry Lolowang	(Indonesia) Henry Cornelis Lakay	(Indonesia) A-Plus
Tangerang Hawks	(Indonesia) Indra Budianto	(Indonesia) Antonius Joko Endratmo	(Indonesia) Rizky Effendi	(Indonesia) Motion Sport
West Bandits Solo	(Indonesia) Cesar W. H. Christian	(Indonesia) Raoul Miguel Hadinoto	(Indonesia) Mei Joni	(Indonesia) Motion Sport

== Drafts ==
=== Foreign players ===
Team	1st pick	2nd pick
Bali United	(United States) Dior Lowhorn	(United States) Julius Bowie
Bima Perkasa Jogja	(United States) Cameron Coleman	(United States) Fuquan Niles
Bumi Borneo Pontianak	(United States) Randy Bell	(United States) Cameron Ridley
Dewa United Banten	(United States) Anthony Johnson	(Dominican Republic) Jeison Colome
Evos Thunder Bogor	(United States) Andre Jackson	(United States) David Haye
Amartha Hangtuah	(United States) Lewis Diankulu	(United States) Ronnie Boyce III
NSH Mountain Gold Timika	(United States) Shavar Newkirk	(United States) (Lebanon) Jarrid Famous
Pacific Caesar	(England) Morakinyo Williams	(United States) Chris Barnes
Pelita Jaya Bakrie	(United States) Dominique Sutton	(United States) Dashaun Wiggins
Prawira Harum Bandung	(Dominican Republic) Brandone Francis	(United States) Jarred Shaw
RANS PIK	(United States) (Jamaica) Akeem Scott	(United States) Akeem Ellis
Satria Muda Pertamina	(United States) Elijah Foster	(United States) Rick Jackson
Satya Wacana Saints	(United States) Shemar Johnson	(United States) Mervyn Lindsay
Tangerang Hawks	(United States) Tyron Criswell	(United States) Anthony Allen
West Bandits	(United States) Prince Williams	(France) Sade Hussain

=== 1st round ===
Round	Pick	Name	Pos	Age	Height	Club
1	1	Victor Jacob Emillio Lobbu	PG	21	1.75 m	Bima Perkasa Jogja
1	2	Ryan Mauliza T.	SG	22	1.79 m	Evos Thunder
1	3	Calvin Yeremias Biyantaka	PG	26	1.77 m	Satya Wacana Saints
1	4	Yohanes Aristakhus	PG	23	1.76 m	Tangerang Hawks
1	5	Muhammad Rafie Fadhali	SF	22	1.85 m	Bali United
1	6	Faishal Luqmanul Hakim	SF	19	1.83 m	Pacific Caesar
1	7	Sultan Prawira	SF	20	1.79 m	Bumi Borneo
1	8	Willy	SG	19	1.78 m	RANS PIK
1	9	Hilario Echo	SG	24	1.83 m	Amartha Hangtuah
1	10	Qiflan Ovalino Arrazza Asmara	PF	24	1.84 m	Dewa United Banten
1	11	Aldi Sutrisno Djaswadi	PG	25	1.78 m	West Bandits
1	12	Jerriel Rhemaldy	SF	21	1.81 m	NSH Mountain Gold Timika
1	13	Yusuf Ammar	SF	20	1.81 m	Prawira Harum Bandung
1	14	Matthew Sebastian	SG	19	1.76 m	Satria Muda Pertamina
1	15	Dennis Lasapu		20	1.83 m	Pelita Jaya Basketball Club

=== 2nd round ===
Round	Pick	Name	Pos	Age	Height	Club
2	16	Muhammad Ghozaly	SG	23	1.71 m	Pacific Caesar
2	17	Ignatio Galih Brahmana	PG	22	1.70 m	Satya Wacana Saints

== Preseason (IBL Indonesia Cup 2022) ==
All games were held in Sritex Arena, Solo from 4 November to 13 November 2022. Only local players participated during this preseason.

=== Group A ===
Pos	Team	Pld	W	L	PF	PA	PD	Pts	Qualification
1	Dewa United Basketball	3	3	0	213	169	+44	6	Advance to quarter-final
2	Satya Wacana	3	2	1	182	173	+9	5	Advance to quarter-final
3	NSH Mountain Gold	3	1	2	160	208	−48	4	
4	Elang Pacific Caesar	3	0	3	170	175	−5	3	

Updated to match(es) played on unknown. Source: IBL Indonesia

=== Group B ===
Pos	Team	Pld	W	L	PF	PA	PD	Pts	Qualification
1	Satria Muda Pertamina	2	2	0	132	107	+25	4	Advance to quarter-final
2	RJ Amartha Hangtuah	2	1	1	142	130	+12	3	Advance to quarter-final
3	Evos Thunder	2	0	2	106	143	−37	2	

Updated to match(es) played on unknown. Source: IBL Indonesia

=== Group C ===
Pos	Team	Pld	W	L	PF	PA	PD	Pts	Qualification
1	Pelita Jaya Bakrie	3	3	0	229	174	+55	6	Advance to quarter-final
2	Bima Perkasa	3	2	1	176	174	+2	5	Advance to quarter-final
3	Bali United Basketball	3	1	2	179	196	−17	4	
4	RANS PIK Basketball	3	0	3	185	225	−40	3	

Updated to match(es) played on unknown. Source: IBL Indonesia

=== Group D ===
Pos	Team	Pld	W	L	PF	PA	PD	Pts	Qualification
1	Prawira Harum	3	3	0	196	169	+27	6	Advance to quarter-final
2	West Bandits	3	2	1	199	175	+24	5	Advance to quarter-final
3	Bumi Borneo Basketball	3	1	2	173	191	−18	4	
4	Tangerang Hawks	3	0	3	171	204	−33	3	

Updated to match(es) played on unknown. Source: IBL Indonesia

=== Finals round ===
Quarter-finals
November 10
Pelita Jaya	81
West Bandits	79
November 10
Bima Perkasa	55
Prawira Bandung	65
November 10
Dewa United Basketball	75
Amartha Hangtuah	64
November 10
Satria Muda	80
Satya Wacana	50

Semi-finals
November 12
Pelita Jaya	71
Prawira Bandung	57
November 12
Dewa United Basketball	67
Satria Muda	78

Final
November 13
Pelita Jaya	70
Satria Muda	62
Third place
November 13
Prawira Bandung	71
Dewa United Basketball	69

==== Individual awards ====
MVP	Club
(Indonesia) Andakara Prastawa	Pelita Jaya Bakrie

== Regular season ==
Pos	Team	Pld	W	L	PF	PA	PD	Pts	Qualification
1	Prawira Bandung	30	27	3	2497	2058	+439	57	Advance to Playoffs
2	Satria Muda Pertamina	30	27	3	2412	2038	+374	57	Advance to Playoffs
3	Pelita Jaya Bakrie	30	27	3	2325	1988	+337	57	Advance to Playoffs
4	Dewa United Banten	30	20	10	2483	2314	+169	50	Advance to Playoffs
5	RANS PIK Basketball	30	19	11	2208	2116	+92	49	Advance to Playoffs
6	Bima Perkasa	30	18	12	2187	2089	+98	48	Advance to Playoffs
7	Bali United	30	15	15	2356	2211	+145	45	Advance to Playoffs
8	Bumi Borneo	30	15	15	2163	2155	+8	45	Advance to Playoffs
9	Tangerang Hawks	30	13	17	2035	2078	−43	43	
10	Indonesia Patriots	30	12	18	2033	2074	−41	42	
11	RJ Amartha Hangtuah	30	12	18	2194	2341	−147	42	
12	Evos Thunder	30	11	19	1920	2078	−158	41	
13	West Bandits	30	8	22	1965	2239	−274	38	
14	NSH Mountain Gold	30	6	24	2133	2412	−279	36	
15	Elang Pacific Caesar	30	6	24	2121	2430	−309	36	
16	Satya Wacana	30	4	26	1821	2212	−391	34	

Updated to match(es) played on unknown. Source: IBL Indonesia

=== Results ===
Home \ Away	AHT	BBC	BBB	BPJ	DBC	ETB	INA	NMG	PCC	PJB	PWR	RNS	SMP	SWS	TGH	WBS
RJ Amartha Hangtuah	—	75–71	88–61	67–83	80–89	73–86	80–87	69–65	85–71	78–99	70–87	77–87	84–91	74–69	53–62	53–64
Bali United Basketball	71–75	—		75–87		68–69			80–72					99–55		
Bumi Borneo Basketball		85–81	—	59–70		68–58		80–73	86–80		76–98				69–64	
Bima Perkasa	83–67			—	94–93						72–70		56–67			
Dewa United Basketball	89–80		81–60		—		73–81					77–60		79–72		86–73
Evos Thunder					88–94	—						53–61			54–63	
Indonesia Patriots	66–63	55–74	60–68	82–57			—		75–67				61–63			
NSH Mountain Gold	65–69	67–79	74–81		64–76		73–72	—	86–80	79–84				78–73	64–60	
Elang Pacific Caesar				53–93		63–89			—	78–89			90–101	88–68	70–76	
Pelita Jaya Bakrie		80–66		75–71		71–53	78–66	81–73		—				78–47		
Prawira Harum		99–92			93–81	74–61				69–45	—	78–61		77–57	88–74	
RANS PIK Basketball		83–72		67–77			68–62		68–64			—			76–56	75–60
Satria Muda Pertamina	106–53	85–65			74–88	70–64		94–63		72–67	88–83		—			
Satya Wacana			53–77			65–50			61–65			60–76	53–60	—		53–64
Tangerang Hawks				66–70	66–87		48–63			57–75			67–76	61–54	—	
West Bandits	84–87	73–77	79–76	70–71	59–83	54–50	80–87				82–100					—

Updated to match(es) played on 06 February, 2023. Source: IBL Indonesia
Legend: Blue = home team win; Red = away team win.

== Playoffs ==
=== Bracket ===
First round
1	Prawira Bandung	79	85
8	Bumi Borneo Basketball	78	73
4	Dewa United	57	76	76
5	RANS PIK Basketball	67	67	62
3	Pelita Jaya Bakrie	70	81
6	Bima Perkasa Jogja	57	73
2	Satria Muda Pertamina	73	75
7	Bali United Basketball	61	67

Semifinals
1	Prawira Bandung	83	88
4	Dewa United	74	80
3	Pelita Jaya Bakrie	80	87
2	Satria Muda Pertamina	67	84

Final
1	Prawira Bandung	74	63
3	Pelita Jaya Bakrie	65	58

=== Final ===
==== Prawira Bandung vs. Pelita Jaya Bakrie ====
20 July
07:00 pm

Pelita Jaya	65–74	Prawira Bandung
Scoring by quarter: 19-16, 19-22, 16-20, 11-16
Pts: A. Goantara 15; Rebs: D. Sutton 13; Asts: A. Dhyaksa 5		Pts: M. F. Guntara 26; Rebs: J. Shaw 11; Asts: Y. Saputera 5
Prawira Bandung leads series, 1–0

Hall Basket Senayan, Jakarta
Referees: B. Marfan, A. Anggoro, R. Dwiantino

22 July
07:00 pm

Prawira Bandung	63–58	Pelita Jaya
Scoring by quarter: 13-17, 21-14, 16-12, 13-15
Pts: J. Shaw 27; Rebs: J. Shaw 10; Asts: Y Saputera 5		Pts: D. Wiggins, D. Sutton 12; Rebs: D. Sutton 13; Asts: D. Sutton 3
Prawira Bandung wins series, 2–0

C-Tra Arena, Bandung
Referees: B. Marfan, S. Wibowo, A. Rajib

==== Finals MVP ====
MVP	Team
(Indonesia) M. Fahdani Guntara	Prawira Bandung

== All-Star Games ==
=== Pre-game ===
Skill-challenge champion : (Indonesia) Team Lobbu: Jacob Lobbu, Johannis Winar, Wenda Wijaya

Three-point contest champion : (Indonesia) Yudha Saputera (Prawira Bandung)

Participants
Pos.	Player	Team	Ht.	Points
SG	Hans Abraham	Prawira Bandung	5'11	31
F	Juan Laurent	Satria Muda Pertamina	6'4	7
SG	Lutfi Alfian Eka Koswara	Bali United Basketball	6'0	15
G	Muhamad Arighi	Pelita Jaya Bakrie	6'0	9
SG	Sandy Febriansyakh	Bali United Basketball	6'3	9
SG	Stevan Wilfredo Neno	Amartha Hangtuah	5'11	14
PG	Yudha Saputera	Prawira Bandung	5'8	34

=== Half game ===
Slam-dunk contest champion : (United States) Ramon Galloway (Dewa United Banten)

Participants
Pos.	Player	Team	Ht.	Points
PG	Chris Barnes	Elang Pacific Caesar	6'5	132
PG	Daffa Dhoifullah	Elang Pacific Caesar	6'1	65
SG	Ramon Galloway	Dewa United Banten	6'1	142
C	Randy Ady Prasetya	Satya Wacana Saints	6'8	85

=== Game ===
==== Team Legacy ====
Pos	Name	Club
Starters
G	(United States) Ramon Galloway	Dewa United Banten
G	(Indonesia) Widyanta Putra Teja	Satria Muda Pertamina
F	(Indonesia) Kaleb Ramot	Dewa United Banten
F	(Indonesia) Juan Laurent	Satria Muda Pertamina
C	(Indonesia) Vincent Kosasih	Pelita Jaya Bakrie
Reserves
G	(Indonesia) Andakara Prastawa	Pelita Jaya Bakrie
G	(Indonesia) Kelly Purwanto	Amartha Hangtuah
F	(Indonesia) Sandy Ibrahim Aziz	Satria Muda Pertamina
F	(Indonesia) Muhammad Reza Guntara	Prawira Bandung
F	(Indonesia) Arki Dikania Wisnu	Satria Muda Pertamina
C	(Indonesia) Henry Lakay	Satya Wacana Saints
G	(United States) Randy Bell	Bumi Borneo
Coach
	(Indonesia) Youbel Sondakh	Satria Muda Pertamina

==== Team Future ====
Pos	Name	Club
Starters
G	(Indonesia) Yudha Saputera	Prawira Bandung
G	(Indonesia) Muhamad Arighi	Pelita Jaya Bakrie
F	(Dominican Republic) Brandone Francis	Prawira Bandung
F	(Indonesia) Ikram Fadhil	Bima Perkasa Yogyakarta
C	(Indonesia) Randy Ady Prasetya	Satya Wacana Saints
Reserves
G	(Indonesia) Rio Disi	West Bandits Solo
G	(Indonesia) Yesaya Saudale	Pelita Jaya Bakrie
G	(Indonesia) Ali Bagir	Satria Muda Pertamina
F	(Indonesia) Dame Diagne	Indonesia Patriots
F	(Indonesia) Julian Chalias	Indonesia Patriots
C	(Indonesia) Argus Sanyudy	Bima Perkasa Yogyakarta
G	(Jamaica) Akeem Scott	RANS PIK
Coach
	(United States) David Singleton	Prawira Bandung

19 March 2023

Team Future 108, Team Legacy 104
Scoring by quarter: 25-34, 59-55, 75–82, 104–108

Knight Stadium, Semarang
Attendance: 2.000

==== Most Valuable Player ====
Country	Name	Team
(Jamaica)	Akeem Scott	RANS PIK

==== Local Best Performer ====
Country	Name	Team
(Indonesia)	Yudha Saputera	Prawira Bandung

== Players of the series ==
Players of the Series
Nationality	Name	Club	Series
United States	Randy Bell	Bumi Borneo Pontianak	Series I
United States	Ramon Galloway	Dewa United Banten	Series II
United States	Morakinyo Williams	Bima Perkasa Jogja	Series III
United States	Ronnie Boyce III	RJ Amartha Hangtuah	Series IV
United States	Shavar Newkirk	NSH Mountain Gold Timika	Series V
United States	Ronnie Boyce III	RJ Amartha Hangtuah	Series VI
United States	Julius Bowie	Bali United Basketball	Series VII
United States	Dominique Sutton	Pelita Jaya Bakrie	Series VIII

== Individual awards ==
2023 IBL awards
Award	Recipient(s)
Most Valuable Player	(Indonesia) Kaleb Ramot Gemilang (Dewa United Banten)
Foreign Player of the Year	(Dominican Republic) Brandone Francis (Prawira Bandung)
Rookie of the Year	(Indonesia) Aven Ryan Pratama (Pacific Caesar Surabaya)
Coach of the Year	(United States) David Singleton (Prawira Bandung)
Defensive Player of the Year	(Indonesia) Muhammad Reza Guntara (Prawira Bandung)
Sixthman of the Year	(Indonesia) Hans Abraham (Prawira Bandung)
Most Improved Player of the Year	(Indonesia) Argus Sanyudy (Bima Perkasa Jogja)
Finals MVP	(Indonesia) Muhammad Reza Guntara (Prawira Bandung)

All-IBL First Team 2023

1. G: Yudha Saputera (Prawira Bandung)
2. G: Muhamad Arighi (Pelita Jaya)
3. F: Muhammad Reza Guntara (Prawira Bandung)
4. F: Kaleb Gemilang (Dewa United Banten)
5. C: Randy Ady Prasetya (Satya Wacana Salatiga)

All-IBL Second Team 2023

1. G: Andakara Prastawa (Pelita Jaya)
2. G: Ikram Fadhil (Bima Perkasa Jogja)
3. F: Arki Dikania Wisnu (Satria Muda Pertamina)
4. F: Juan Laurent (Satria Muda Pertamina)
5. C: Muhammad Rizky Ari Daffa (Bumi Borneo Pontianak)

All-IBL Defensive Team 2023

1. G: A.A. Ngurah Wisnu Budidharma (Bumi Borneo Pontianak)
2. G: Andakara Prastawa (Pelita Jaya)
3. F: Muhammad Reza Guntara (Prawira Bandung)
4. F: Ikram Fadhil (Bima Perkasa Jogja)
5. C: Agus Salim (RANS PIK Basketball)
