= Abraham Wenas =

Indonesian basketball player

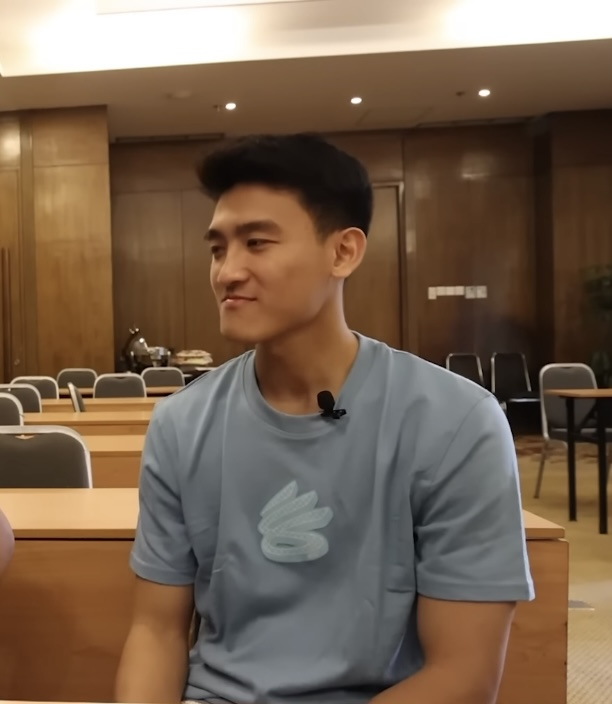
- Wenas with Bali United in 2024

No. 6 – Kesatria Bengawan Solo
- Position: Point guard
- League: IBL

Personal information
- Born: 5 June 1996 (age 30) Balikpapan, Indonesia
- Listed height: 175 cm (5 ft 9 in)
- Listed weight: 70 kg (154 lb)

Career information
- High school: SMAN 1 (Balikpapan, Indonesia)
- College: Esa Unggul University
- Playing career: 2017–present

Career history
- 2017-2021: Amartha Hangtuah/Hangtuah Sumsel
- 2021-2024: Bali United Basketball
- 2024-present: Kesatria Bengawan Solo

Career highlights
- IBL Skill-challenge champion (2024); 3× All-IBL Indonesian Second Team (2020, 2024, 2026); 2× IBL All-Star (2019, 2024); IBL Rookie of the Year (2018)

Abraham Renoldi Wenas (born June 5, 1996) is an Indonesian professional basketball player for the Kesatria Bengawan Solo of the Indonesian Basketball League (IBL). He played college basketball for the UEU Swans.

Wenas represented the East Kalimantan province at several national competitions.

== College career ==
He was college teammates with Kesatria Bengawan Solo player, Kevin Moses Poetiray.

== National team career ==
Called up to the Indonesia men's national basketball team 18-man training camp for the 2025 FIBA Asia Cup qualification.
