= Esa Unggul University =

University in Jakarta, Indonesia

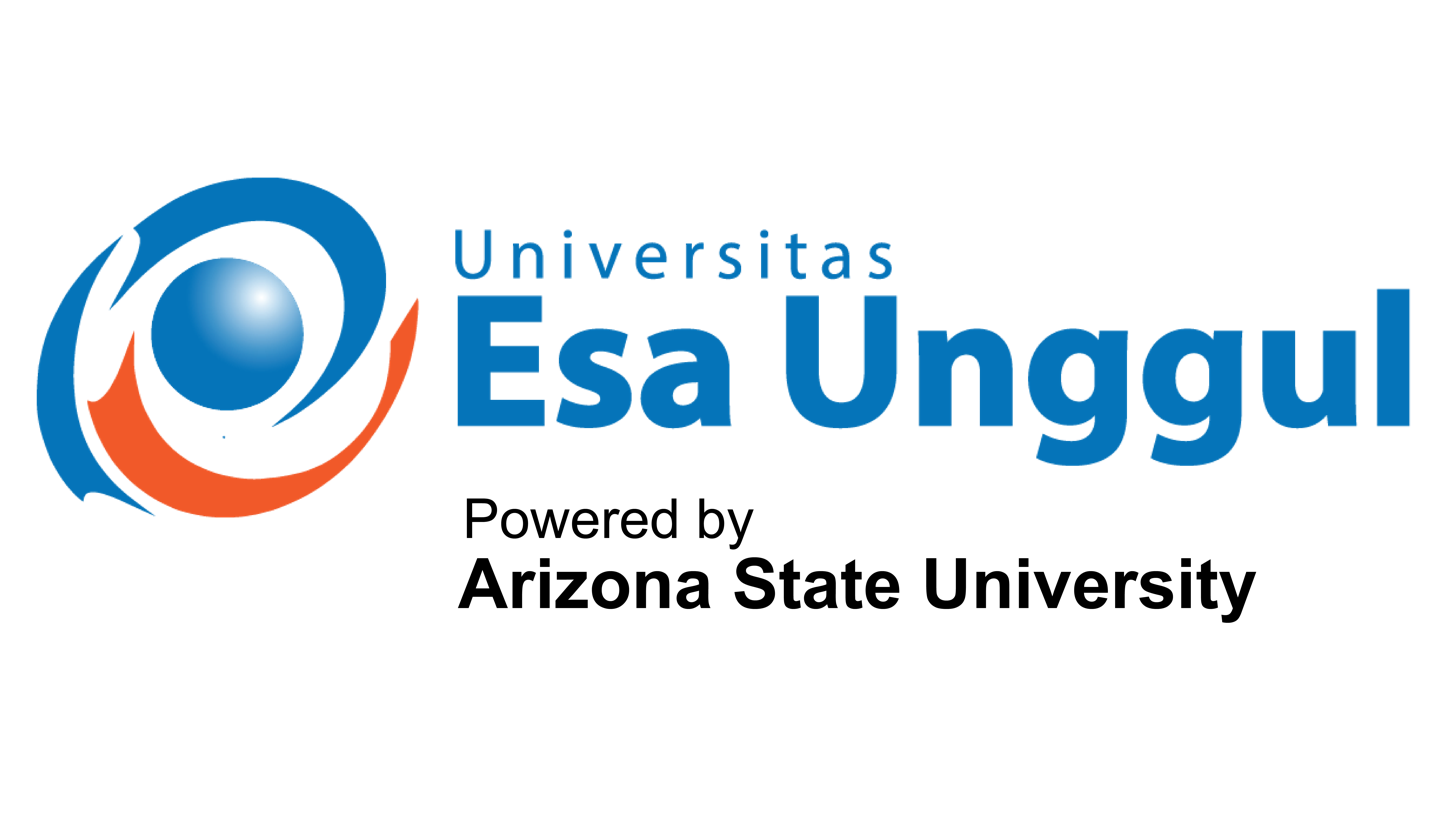
- Motto: Smart, Creative and Entrepreneurial
- Type: Private University
- Established: 1993
- Affiliations: ASIC
- Rector: Dr. Ir. Arief Kusuma A.P., IPU, MBA.
- Academic staff: 529 (2019)
- Students: 14,275 (2019)
- Location: Kebon Jeruk, West Jakarta, Jakarta, Indonesia
- Campus: Jakarta Campus; Bekasi Campus; Tangerang Campus; International Campus
- Colors: Blue Orange
- Sporting affiliations: LIMA
- Mascot: Swans
- Website: www.esaunggul.ac.id

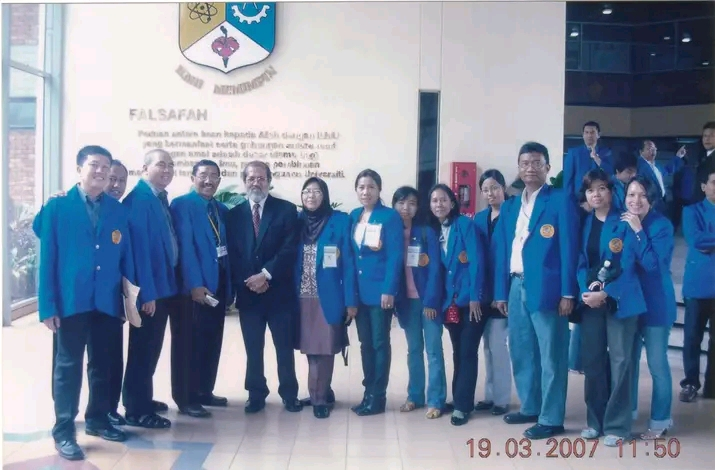
Esa Unggul University Group in National University of Malaysia

The Esa Unggul University (Indonesian: Universitas Esa Unggul, abbreviated as UEU) is a private university and located in four different areas in Jakarta, Tangerang dan Bekasi. Esa Unggul University was established in 1993.

== History ==
Esa Unggul University (UEU) was founded in 1993 under the auspices of the “Kemala Bangsa Education Foundation”. As a part of the ASU-Cintana Alliance, The university is the only institution within the country that is partnering with the Arizona State University, allowing its students to access US-standard education and enhances its curriculum, faculty development and international opportunities. Through Powered by ASU, UEU students are given opportunities for learning and exchange with other Cintana partner universities in Turkey, Costa Rica, Ecuador, Mexico, India and beyond. In addition to this, UEU students can also take their educational experience to the next level at the Arizona State University with opportunities to study at ASU campuses in Arizona, Washington, D.C. or Los Angeles.

== Academics ==
=== Faculty ===
The university comprises 10 faculties which offer courses at diploma, undergraduate and postgraduate levels.

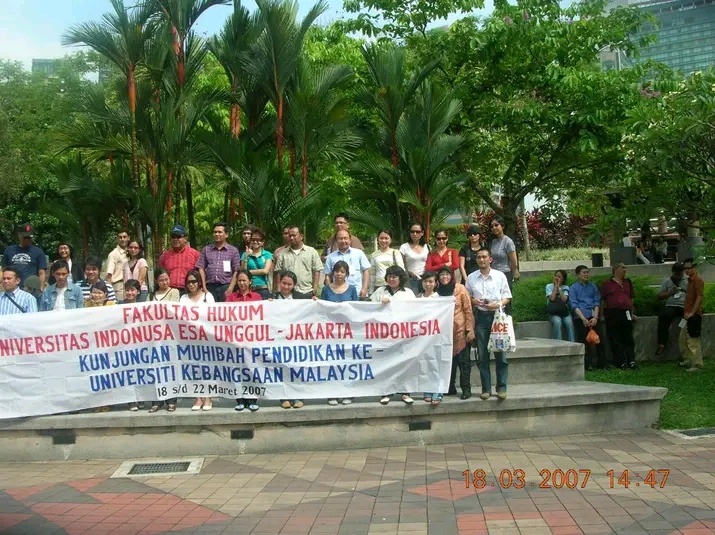
Esa Unggul University Team in Selangor Malaysia

== Location and Campuses ==
The university has four campuses.

- Universitas Esa Unggul Kampus Jakarta: Jalan Arjuna Utara No.9, Kebon Jeruk, Jakarta 11510.
- Universitas Esa Unggul Kampus Tangerang: Jl. Citra Raya Boulevard Blok. S 25/ 01, Kelurahan Panongan, Kecamatan Panongan, Kabupaten Tangerang, Banten 15711.
- Universitas Esa Unggul Kampus Bekasi: Jalan Harapan Indah Boulevard No. 2, Pusaka Rakyat, Kec. Tarumajaya, Bekasi, West Java 17214.
- Universitas Esa Unggul Kampus International: Jl. Raya Legok – Karawaci, Curug Sangereng, Klp. Dua, Tangerang, Banten 15810 (Majestic Point Serpong).

== Notable alumni ==
- Kezia Warouw, Indonesian model, Presenter and Puteri Indonesia 2016 winner, Miss Phoenix Smile & Top 13 of Miss Universe 2016.
- Bunga Jelitha, Indonesian model and Puteri Indonesia 2017 winner, Supermodel International 2011 & Guess Girl South East Asia 2015.
- Isman Thoyib, Indonesia men's national basketball team.
- Dimyati Natakusumah, member of Indonesian People's Representative Council (2009–2018)
- Irna Narulita, current regent of Pandeglang Regency
- Abraham Damar Grahita, Indonesia men's national basketball team
- Kevin Moses Poetiray, professional basketball player for Kesatria Bengawan Solo.
- Abraham Wenas, professional basketball player for Bali United Basketball.
