= Assault of Steven Yadohamang =

2021 physical abuse of West Papuan

- Location: Merauke, Papua, Indonesia
- Date: 26 July 2021
- Attack type: Police brutality
- Victim: Steven Yadohamang
- Perpetrator: Two Indonesian Air Force Military Police
- Sparked national outrage and international condemnation.

On Monday, 26 July 2021, a deaf Papuan man named Steven Yadohamang was assaulted by two Indonesian Air Force Military Police from Johanes Abraham Dimara Air Base, Merauke Regency, Papua. A video recording of the incident went viral and sparked substantial national concern. There are several versions circulating on the internet of how the incident began. The incident caused public outrage both in Indonesia and overseas, as well as leading to some high-ranking officials being fired.

== Incident ==
The incident took place on Monday, 26 July 2021, near Ngapak Bubur Warung, Jalan Raya Mandala, Mandala Village, Merauke, Papua. Military Police Serda Dimas and Prada Rian encountered a commotion at the Ngapak Porridge Shop. Serda Dimas and Prada Rian then approached Steven. They grabbed hold of Steven and forced his face down on the pavement, then they stepped on Steven's head. The military source said that Steven was drunk and extorting the seller. Both officers decided to intervene and stop the fight. They scolded Steven and pressed him down before one of them stepped on his head.

However, according to some civilians at the scene, Steven was angry at the seller because the goods he received were not the same as those he ordered. Steven asked the seller to return his money. The vendor disagreed and insisted that Steven take the food.

== Reaction ==
The video quickly went viral in Indonesia, shared on WhatsApp and Twitter. "Indonesian Air Force" became a trending topic on Indonesian Twitter shortly after. Netizens condemned the incident, with some comparing it to the murder of George Floyd.

The Chief of Air Force Staff, Marshall Fadjar Prasetyo, apologized to the public for the incident. The Indonesian Air Force Air Chief Marshall, Hadi Tjahjanto, fired the commander of Johanes Abraham Dimara Air Base and the commander of the base's police military unit and apologized to the public. Papua Legal Aid (Lembaga Bantuan Hukum Papua) condemned the incident and urged the government to fire both employees. Human rights activist Veronica Koman stated that an apology was not enough and that there should be a transparent ruling from a civilian court. She threatened to bring the case to the United Nations if it was not prosecuted transparently in civilian courts.

The National Commission on Human Rights condemned the incident and reported it to the commander of the Indonesian Armed Forces. The Indonesian Armed Forces promised to persecute both men involved. The alleged perpetrators are currently jailed in Merauke, awaiting further investigation of the case. It is not yet clear what kind of punishment both personnel will receive. Indonesian NGO "Tim Advokasi" implored President Joko Widodo to apologize to the victims for the incident and urged for a transparent investigation into the case. After uploading a video of the incident, the Twitter account of Papuan journalist Victor Mambo disappeared. The Governor of Papua province, Lukas Enembe, condemned the incident and asked Papuan people to pay attention to the investigation.
