= Keljin Blevins =

American basketball player (born 1995)

No. 4 – Sharjah
- Position: Shooting guard / point guard
- League: UAE National Basketball League

Personal information
- Born: November 24, 1995 (age 30) Hot Springs, Arkansas, U.S.
- Listed height: 6 ft 4 in (1.93 m)
- Listed weight: 200 lb (91 kg)

Career information
- High school: Lakeside (Hot Springs, Arkansas); Bishop O'Connell (Arlington County, Virginia)
- College: Southern Miss (2014–2016); Montana State (2017–2019)
- NBA draft: 2019: undrafted
- Playing career: 2019–present

Career history
- 2019–2020: Northern Arizona Suns
- 2020–2022: Portland Trail Blazers
- 2022–2023: Rapid București
- 2023–2024: Sudbury Five
- 2024: Pacific Caesar
- 2024–2025: Bima Perkasa Jogja
- 2026–present: Sharjah SC
- Stats at NBA.com
- Stats at Basketball Reference

Keljin DeShawn Blevins (born November 24, 1995) is an American professional basketball player for Sharjah SC of the UAE National Basketball League. He played college basketball for the Southern Miss Golden Eagles and Montana State Bobcats.

== Early life and high school ==
Blevins was born and grew up in Hot Springs, Arkansas and initially attended Lakeside High School. He averaged 10 points and 7.3 rebounds per game and helped lead the Rams to a 5A-South conference title as a junior. Blevins transferred to Bishop O'Connell High School in Arlington County, Virginia for his senior year and was named honorable mention All-Washington Catholic Athletic Conference.

== College career ==
Blevins began his collegiate career at Southern Mississippi. He averaged 1.8 points and 1.8 rebounds in 25 games in his freshman season. As a sophomore, Blevins averaged 5.8 points and 3.4 rebounds in 22.3 minutes over 29 games, 24 of which he started. After the season, he decided to transfer to Montana State University.

After sitting out one year due to NCAA transfer rules, Blevins entered his redshirt junior season as a starter for the Bobcats and averaged 9.7 points and 5.8 rebounds per game. In the final game of his college career on March 14, 2019, Blevins scored a career-high 27 points in a 90–84 loss to Eastern Washington. As a redshirt senior, he averaged 11.8 points and a team-high 5.9 rebounds per game.

== Professional career ==
=== Northern Arizona Suns (2019–2020) ===
After going unselected in the 2019 NBA draft, Blevins played on the Portland Trail Blazers Summer League team and signed a training camp contract with the team on September 30, 2019. He was waived at the end of training camp.

After being waived, Blevins was selected with the 15th overall pick in the 2019 NBA G League Draft by the Northern Arizona Suns. He averaged 4.3 points and 2.8 rebounds in 35 games in his first professional season.

=== Portland Trail Blazers (2020–2022) ===
Blevins was signed by the Trail Blazers to a two-way contract on November 25, 2020. Blevins made his NBA debut on December 23, 2020, playing four minutes while shooting 0-for-2 from the field with one assist in the fourth quarter of a 100–120 loss to the Utah Jazz in the Blazers' season opener. The appearance made him the first former Montana State player to play in an NBA game.

On September 23, 2021, Blevins signed another two-way contract with the Trail Blazers.

=== Rapid București (2022–2023) ===
In 2022, Blevins joined Rapid București of the Liga Națională, averaging 4.8 points, 3.2 rebounds and 1.2 assists per game. He was released on March 3, 2023.

=== Sudbury Five (2023–2024) ===
On November 25, 2023, Blevins signed with the Sudbury Five.

=== Indonesia (2024–present) ===
In April 2024, Blevins joined the Pacific Caesar of the Indonesian Basketball League (IBL) to replace Nick Wiggins. In December 2024, Blevins joined the Bima Perkasa Jogja for the 2025 IBL season.

== Career statistics ==
Legend
GP	Games played	GS	Games started	MPG	Minutes per game
FG%	Field goal percentage	3P%	3-point field goal percentage	FT%	Free throw percentage
RPG	Rebounds per game	APG	Assists per game	SPG	Steals per game
BPG	Blocks per game	PPG	Points per game	**Bold**	Career high

=== NBA ===
==== Regular season ====
Year	Team	GP	GS	MPG	FG%	3P%	FT%	RPG	APG	SPG	BPG	PPG
2020–21	Portland	17	0	4.4	.250	.250	–	.6	.2	.1	.0	.7
2021–22	Portland	**31**	**1**	**11.3**	**.306**	**.292**	**.545**	**1.5**	**.6**	**.4**	.0	**3.1**
Career		48	1	8.8	.298	.288	.545	1.1	.5	.3	.0	2.2

==== Playoffs ====
Year	Team	GP	GS	MPG	FG%	3P%	FT%	RPG	APG	SPG	BPG	PPG
2021	Portland	2	0	2.0	.500	.000	–	.0	.0	.0	.0	1.0

=== G-League ===
==== Regular season ====
Year	Team	GP	GS	MPG	FG%	3P%	FT%	RPG	APG	SPG	BPG	PPG
2019–20	Northern Arizona	35	0	16.1	.400	.267	.882	2.8	1.0	.4	.2	4.3

=== College ===
Year	Team	GP	GS	MPG	FG%	3P%	FT%	RPG	APG	SPG	BPG	PPG
2014–15	Southern Miss	25	13	15.9	.268	.129	.524	1.8	.8	.3	.1	1.8
2015–16	Southern Miss	29	24	22.3	.340	.224	.642	3.4	.7	.4	.2	5.8
2017–18	Montana State	**32**	**31**	24.5	.424	.237	**.683**	5.8	.9	.6	**.4**	9.7
2018–19	Montana State	31	**31**	**28.4**	**.429**	**.284**	.624	**5.9**	**1.6**	**.7**	.3	**11.8**
Career		117	99	23.2	.399	.234	.645	4.4	1.0	.5	.3	7.6

== Personal life ==
Blevins is the cousin of current Portland Trail Blazers All-Star point guard Damian Lillard. He also was teammates with Lillard from 2020 to 2022 while in Portland.
