= Pelita Harapan University =

Private university in Indonesia

Coordinates: 6.2292°S 106.6108°E

- Universitas Pelita Harapan
- Motto: True Knowledge, Faith in God and Godly Character
- Type: Private, Evangelical, Coeducational secondary and tertiary education institution
- Established: 13 December 1993 (32 years ago)
- Founders: Johannes Oentoro and James T. Riady
- Religious affiliation: Protestant (Reformed)
- Rector: Jonathan Limbong Parapak
- Location: Jl. M. H. Thamrin Boulevard 1100 Lippo Village Tangerang, Indonesia 15811
- Campus: Urban Main Lippo Village Campus Tangerang, Banten Satellite; Surabaya Campus Surabaya, East Java; Medan Campus Medan, North Sumatra
- Colors: Blue and Red
- Sporting affiliations: LIMA
- Mascot: Eagle
- Website: www.uph.edu

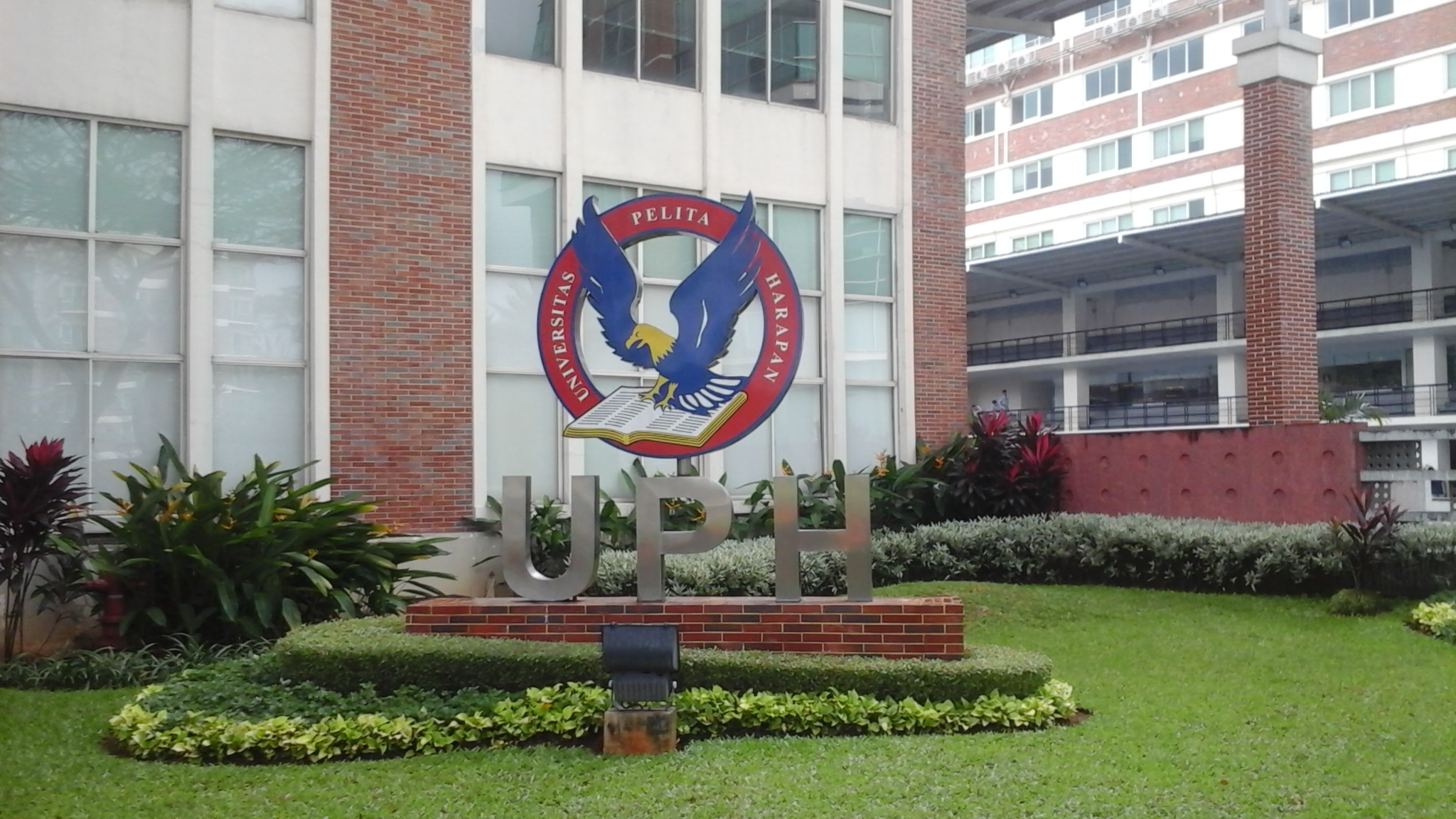
Pelita Harapan University logo landmark in campus

Pelita Harapan University (Indonesian: Universitas Pelita Harapan) abbreviated as UPH, is a private Reformed Evangelical coeducational higher education institution run by the Pelita Harapan Education Foundation (Indonesian: Yayasan Pendidikan Pelita Harapan) in Lippo Village, Tangerang, Banten, Indonesia. It was founded in 1993 and is part of the Lippo Group.

UPH was the first university in Indonesia to introduce programs entirely taught in English, the first to offer a liberal arts curriculum, and the first to introduce a multi-disciplinary approach to its programs.

== History ==
UPH was founded in 1993.

On September 27, 1994, lecture activities began at the Asia Tower with approximately 250 students in 3 faculties and 8 departments, while construction of the UPH Tower building was underway.

In 1995, all lecture activities were moved to UPH Tower. In the same year, the Pelita Harapan Education Foundation opened the Pelita Harapan Tourism Academy with majors in Hotel Management and Tourism Business Management as well as the Faculty of Communication Sciences. In line with the growth in the number of students and the increase in departments, the construction of campus buildings also increased, starting with Building B (2000, originally a parking building), Building C (2004), Building E (2005), Building D (2006), and Building F or UPH Business School (2008)

In 2006, UPH also opened international classes for those who wish to obtain a Bachelor's degree in Indonesia. Meanwhile, for the Master's program, UPH opens classes in the Semanggi, Jakarta area. In 2007, UPH opened branches outside Jabodetabek, one of which is in Surabaya, East Java, with its 6 bachelor's degree programs and 2 master's degree programs. As part of the university's attempt to directly implement technology into the teaching and learning system, various high-tech facilities are provided for students, including Smart Cards (UPH Student Cards), among other things.

In 2006, UPH opened two residence halls, one of which was the MYC Dormitory. Students at the university's teacher's college are assigned to the Teacher College Dormitory, which opened in July.

In 2007, UPH opened its second campus in Surabaya, East Java

In 2014, UPH opened its third campus in Medan.

== Secondary school ==
UPH has an affiliated secondary school, called UPH College. It is a high school established in 2010 in Lippo Village, Karawaci, Tangerang and operates under a Christian system while maintaining cultural and religious diversity. It also has a student dormitory.

Its program provides a national plus curriculum, making it semi-international. In addition to its full program, UPH College also has a Distance Learning Program that allows students from grades 10 to 12 to receive education without being limited by space and time. The school offers elective courses across various fields including music, visual arts, performing arts, foreign languages, and technology-based subjects that students can choose based on their interests and career goals.

== Undergraduate Programs ==
=== Faculties and Programs ===
- Faculty of Economics
1. Department of Accounting
2. Department of Management
- Faculty of Computer Science
1. Information Systems
2. Informatics Engineering
3. Computer Systems
- Faculty of Design
1. Architecture
2. Interior Design
3. Product Design
4. Visual Communication Design
- Faculty of Education
1. Elementary School Teacher Education
2. Mathematics Education
3. Biology Education
4. Social Studies Education
5. Christian Religious Education
6. Indonesian Language Education
7. English Language Education
- Faculty of Science and Technology
1. Applied Mathematics
2. Biotechnology
3. Electrical Engineering
4. Industrial Engineering
5. Civil Engineering
6. Food Technology
7. Pharmacy
- Faculty of Law
- Faculty of Liberal Arts
- Faculty of Medicine
- Faculty of Arts
1. Classical Music Performance
2. Popular and Jazz Music Performance
3. Music Therapy
4. Sound Design and Music Production
5. Music Education
6. Performing Arts Management and Production
- Faculty of Nursing and Health Sciences
- Faculty of Psychology
- Faculty of Philosophy
- Faculty of Social and Political Sciences
1. Communication
2. International Relations
3. Distance Education Communication Science
- Faculty of Tourism
1. Hotel Management
2. Travel Business Management
- Online Learning Program

== Postgraduate Programs ==
=== Master Programs ===
- Faculty of Social and Political Sciences
1. Digital Marketing Management
2. Financial and Business Management
3. Organizational Development and Human Resources
4. Retail, Logistics and Supply Chain Management
- Master of Communication
1. Media Studies
- Master of International Relations
1. International Economic Politics, Politics of International Trade and Security
- Master of Civil Engineering
1. Construction Management
- Master of Education
1. Educational Technology
2. Educational Management
3. Early Childhood Education
4. Systemic Master of Education in Educational Leadership
5. TESOL (Teaching English to Speakers of Other Languages)
- Master of Notary
- Master of Laws
1. Business Law
2. MTIC
- International Executive Master Program (UPH Executive Education Center)
1. IMM (International Master of Management/Junior)
2. IEMM (International Executive Master of Management)
3. MHM (Master of Hospital Management MMRS&MM)
- Master of Informatics
1. Concentrations - Cloud Computing, Medical Informatics, AI, Cybernetics, Blockchain, Data Science and Business Analytics

=== Doctoral Programs ===
1. Doctor of Laws
2. Doctor of Management

== Notable alumni ==
- Vidi Aldiano, actor and singer
- Marcel Chandrawinata, Indonesian actor
- Athari Gauthi Ardi, businessperson and politician
- Veronica Koman, human rights activist
- Agnez Mo, actress, singer and songwriter
- Lestari Moerdijat, politician
- Mikha Tambayong, actress and singer
- Sandiaga Uno, Minister of Tourism and Creative Economy, former Vice Governor of Jakarta, businessman
- Astrid Yunadi, Indonesian Model and Miss Indonesia 2011
- Yesaya Saudale, professional basketball player for Pelita Jaya Bakrie Jakarta
- Muhamad Arighi, professional basketball player, and Indonesia national team
- Juan Laurent Kokodiputra, professional basketball player for Satria Muda Pertamina and the Indonesia national team
- Hans Abraham, professional basketball player for Prawira Bandung
- Cassiopeia Manuputty, professional basketball player for Rajawali Medan
- Veronica Tan, Deputy Ministry of Women Empowerment and Child Protection
- Agnes Aditya Rahajeng, Puteri Indonesia 2026

== See also ==
- UPH Eagles Basketball Team
- UPH College
