= Muhammad Nur Aziz Wardana =

Indonesian basketball player

Personal information
- Born: September 29, 1994 (age 32)
- Listed height: 6 ft 5 in (1.96 m)

Career information
- Playing career: 2014–2021
- Position: Center

Career history
- 2014–2021: Pacific Caesar Surabaya

Muhammad Nur Aziz Wardana (born September 25, 1994), is a former Indonesian professional basketball player. He formerly played for the Pacific Caesar Surabaya club of the Indonesian Basketball League.

He represented Indonesia's national basketball team at the 2016 SEABA Cup, where he was his team's best rebounder and shot blocker.
