= Nick Wiggins (basketball) =

Canadian basketball player (born 1991)

Free agent
- Position: Shooting guard / small forward

Personal information
- Born: February 4, 1991 (age 35) Toronto, Ontario, Canada
- Listed height: 6 ft 6 in (1.98 m)
- Listed weight: 191 lb (87 kg)

Career information
- High school: Godby (Tallahassee, Florida)
- College: Vincennes (2010–2011); Wabash Valley (2011–2012); Wichita State (2012–2014)
- NBA draft: 2014: undrafted
- Playing career: 2014–present

Career history
- 2014: Tigers Tübingen
- 2015: Idaho Stampede
- 2015: Raptors 905
- 2016: Mackay Meteors
- 2016: Rabotnički
- 2017: Orangeville A's
- 2018–2019: Argentino de Junín
- 2019: Hi-Tech Bangkok City
- 2019: Bauru
- 2021: Cerrado Basquete
- 2021: Indios de San Francisco de Macorís
- 2021–2022: Yulon Luxgen Dinos
- 2022: Jeoutai Technology
- 2023: Brampton Honey Badgers
- 2024: Pacific Caesar

Career highlights
- Thailand Super League Champion (2019); MVC All-Bench Team (2013)
- Stats at Basketball Reference

Nicholas Wiggins (born February 4, 1991) is a Canadian professional basketball player who last played for the Pacific Caesar Surabaya of the Indonesian Basketball League (IBL). He played college basketball for Wichita State.

== Early life ==
Wiggins was born and raised in Toronto, Ontario, where he played his high school hoops at Vaughan Secondary School before moving to Florida for his junior year at Godby High School in Tallahassee. At Godby, Wiggins was one of the Sunshine State's top prep players in 2008–09 for head coach Andrew Colville.

== College career ==
After averaging 16.6 points per game as a freshman at Vincennes University in 2010–11, Wiggins moved to Wabash Valley JC for his sophomore year in 2011–12. He averaged 17.3 points, 3.7 rebounds and 1.2 assists per game as he earned second-team All-American honors after leading the Warriors to a 27–10 record and an eighth-place finish in the NJCAA Tournament in Hutchinson. He was subsequently named to the NJCAA all-tournament team after averaging 20.2 points.

For his junior year, Wiggins transferred to Wichita State, where he went on to earn 2012–13 MVC All-Bench team honors after averaging 4.9 points and 1.8 rebounds in 36 games. As a senior in 2013–14, he again played 36 games while averaging 5.1 points and 2.3 rebounds per game.

== Professional career ==
=== Germany ===
After going undrafted in the 2014 NBA draft, Wiggins joined the Sacramento Kings for the 2014 NBA Summer League. On July 26, 2014, he signed a one-year deal with Tigers Tübingen of the German Basketball Bundesliga. However, he parted ways with the club on December 3, 2014, after appearing in 11 games. Over those 11 games, he averaged 5.5 points and 1.8 rebounds per game.

=== NBA D-League ===
On January 9, 2015, Wiggins was acquired by the Idaho Stampede of the NBA Development League. In 28 games for Idaho in 2014–15, he averaged 9.8 points and 2.0 rebounds per game.

In July 2015, Wiggins joined the Utah Jazz for the Utah Summer League and the Minnesota Timberwolves for the Las Vegas Summer League. On September 18, 2015, Wiggins signed with the Timberwolves, but was waived by the team on October 24 after appearing in four preseason games. On November 1, he returned to the Stampede, but was waived on November 11. Two days later, he was acquired by Raptors 905. On December 26, he was waived by Raptors 905 after appearing in 10 games. Over those 10 games, he averaged 4.0 points and 1.7 rebounds per game.

=== New Zealand and Australia ===
On January 26, 2016, Wiggins signed with the Canterbury Rams for the 2016 New Zealand NBL season. However, on March 7, just days before the start of the season, he was released by the Rams.

A day after being cut by the Rams, Wiggins signed with the Mackay Meteors for the 2016 Queensland Basketball League season. He made his debut for the Meteors in the team's season opener on April 30, scoring 23 points in 30 minutes as a starter in a 96–86 loss to the Cairns Marlins. On May 15, he had a 32-point performance in a 107–89 win over the Rockhampton Rockets. On June 8, he was released by the Meteors after the team went 4–4 over the first half of the season. In those eight games, Wiggins averaged 21.4 points, 5.8 rebounds and 2.9 assists per game.

=== Macedonia ===
In October 2016, Wiggins signed a short-term contract with Rabotnički of the Macedonian First League. On December 25, 2016, the club parted ways with Wiggins after deciding not to extend his contract. In eight games for Rabotnički, he averaged 10.1 points, 4.5 rebounds and 1.0 assists per game.

=== Canada ===
In January 2017, Wiggins joined the Orangeville A's of the National Basketball League of Canada. His stint with Orangeville lasted less than a month, as he averaged 5.8 points in eight games.

=== Indonesia ===
In January 2024, Wiggins signed with Pacific Caesar Surabaya replacing Kamani Johnson.

== Personal life ==
Both of Wiggins' parents are in the Florida State Athletic Hall of Fame. His father, Mitchell, was an honorable mention All-American at Florida State and went on to play six seasons in the NBA. His mother, Marita, was a 21-time NCAA All-American sprinter and went on to win two silver medals for Canada at the 1984 Olympic Games. He also has two brothers, Mitchell and Andrew, and three sisters, Stephanie, Angelica, and Taya. His brother, Andrew, was selected with the first overall pick in the 2014 NBA draft.
