= Ponsianus Nyoman Indrawan =

Indonesian basketball player

Ponsianus Indrawan
No. 13 – Kesatria Bengawan Solo
- Position: Center / power forward
- League: IBL

Personal information
- Born: 13 August 1985 (age 41) Badung, Indonesia
- Listed height: 196 cm (6 ft 5 in)
- Listed weight: 100 kg (220 lb)

Career information
- College: Gadjah Mada University
- Playing career: 2006–present

Career history
- 2006-2009: Bima Sakti Nikko Steel Malang
- 2009-2019: Pelita Jaya
- 2020-2024: Bali United Basketball
- 2024-present: Kesatria Bengawan Solo

Career highlights
- IBL champion (2017); NBL Indonesia Most Valuable Player (2014); All-IBL Indonesian Second Team (2024); All-IBL Indonesian First Team (2021); IBL All-Star (2017); All-NBL Indonesia First Team (2014)
Medals
Men's basketball
Representing Indonesia
Southeast Asian Games
| Silver medal – second place | 2015 Singapore | Team |
| Bronze medal – third place | 2025 Thailand | Team |

Ponsianus Nyoman Indrawan (born August 13, 1985) known by his nickname Komink, is an Indonesian professional basketball player for Kesatria Bengawan Solo of the Indonesian Basketball League (IBL).

== Professional career ==
He briefly retired from basketball, but he shortly returned to play for Bali United.

== National team career ==
Indrawan debuted as an Indonesia national team player at the 2009 FIBA Asia Championship in Tianjin, China. And then at the 2011 FIBA Asia Championship in Wuhan, China, and 2015 SEA Games, where he won the silver medal for basketball.

In 2025, 40-year old Indrawan is called up for the 2025 SEA Games that is held in Bangkok, Thailand. The reason David Singleton called up Indrawan, is to fill his role as a leader for the young and upcoming national team players.
