= Jonathan Limbong Parapak =

Indonesian rector (born 1942)

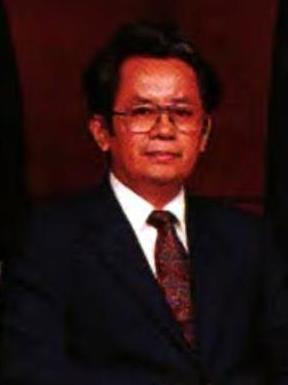
- Born: July 12, 1942 (age 83); La'bo', Sanggalangi, North Toraja Regency, South Sulawesi, Indonesia
- Occupation: Rector
- Known for: The pioneer of the concept of telematics in Indonesia, President Director of Indosat, Secretary General of Department of Tourism, Post, and Telecommunications, and Chancellor of Pelita Harapan University

Dr. (H.C.) Jonathan Limbong Parapak, MEng.Sc. (born July 12, 1942) is a lecturer and former President Director of PT Indonesian Satellite Corporation (Indosat). He currently serves as the rector of Pelita Harapan University, Tangerang, replacing the previous rector, Johannes Oentoro. He also served as Secretary General of the Department of Tourism, Post, and Telecommunications in 1991–1998. In 2000, he submitted an early retirement request to the Minister of Tourism, Arts and Culture, to choose to serve in the field of education. He joined Universitas Pelita Harapan (UPH) as an advisor in 2001 and was appointed as the Rector of Pelita Harapan University in 2006.

== Biography ==
Jonathan Parapak was born July 12, 1942, in La'bo Village, North Toraja Regency, his father was an employee of the Forestry Service who always moved house following assignments while his mother was a housewife. After high school, and had tried at the Faculty of Medicine Hasanuddin University, Makassar, but did not finish. He immediately registered at the University of Tasmania, Australia through a scholarship program from the Australian government, he majored in mechanical engineering. After graduating from the same university, Jonathan enrolled for a master in engineering at the same university. To gain more knowledge, he took an executive course at Syracuse University. He returned to Indonesia in 1969. On December 4, 1971, he married Anne Berniece Atkinson, a fellow minister who met at a campus prayer fellowship activity on his campus.

He started his early career as a staff of PT Indosat in 1969, then from 1980 to 1991, he sat as President Director of PT Indosat. He received a Doctorate Honoris Causa (H.C) from Ouachita Baptist University.
