= Dino Butorac =

Bosnian basketball player (born 1990)

Free agent
- Position: Shooting guard

Personal information
- Born: October 8, 1990 (age 36) Požega, Croatia
- Listed height: 1.93 m (6 ft 4 in)

Career information
- Playing career: 2011–present

Career history
- 2011–2012: HKK Široki
- 2012–2013: KK Jolly Jadranska Banka
- 2013–2015: Södertälje Kings
- 2015–2016: Falco KC Szombathely
- 2017–2018: Rostock Seawolves
- 2018–2019: Tindastóll
- 2019–2020: Þór Þorlákshöfn
- 2020–2021: Jazine Arbanasi
- 2021: Trepça
- 2021–2025: Spars
- 2023: JuveCaserta
- 2025–2026: Pacific Caesar

Career highlights
- 2x Swedish Basketball League champion (2014, 2015); Bosnia and Herzegovina Basketball League champion (2012); Bosnia and Herzegovina Cup (2012); Icelandic Super Cup (2018)

Dino Butorac (born October 8, 1990) is a Croatian professional basketball player who last played for Pacific Caesar of the Indonesian Basketball League (IBL). During his career he has won the Swedish Basketball League twice, in 2014 and 2015, and the Bosnia and Herzegovina Basketball League in 2012.

== Playing career ==
In September 2011, he signed with HKK Široki in Bosnia. He won both the Bosnian Cup and the league championship.

In July 2012, he signed a contract with KK Jolly JBS in Croatia where he reached semifinals and lost against KK Cibona who ended winning the title.

Sodertalje Kings was the next stop in 2013 where he ended up playing two seasons and won the championship both times. In the second year with the team he had a key role in the playoffs, averaging 15 points. Next stop was Hungarian team Falco Szombathely where averaged 10.6 points and three rebounds but ended the season with English team Plymouth Raiders.

Butorac spent the 2015–2016 season with. Falco KC Szombathely of the Nemzeti Bajnokság I/A.

In August 2018, Butorac signed with Tindastóll of the Icelandic Úrvalsdeild karla. During his Úrvalsdeild debut, he posted a triple-double with 12 points, ten rebounds and 11 assists. For the season he averaged 11.4 points, 3.9 rebounds and 3.4 assists in 27 regular season and playoffs games.

In October 2019, Butorac returned to the Úrvalsdeild and signed with Þór Þorlákshöfn where he replaced Vladimir Nemcok. For the season, he averaged 8.4 points, 4.2 rebounds and 4.3 assists.

== National team career ==
Croatian national team :

- 3rd place World Champhionship U19, New Zealand (2009)
- 4th place European Championship U20, Croatia (2010)

== Awards and accomplishments ==
=== Club honours ===
- Swedish champion (2): 2014, 2015
- Bosnia and Herzegovina Basketball champion: 2012
- Bosnia and Herzegovina Cup: 2012
