= Avan Seputra =

Indonesian basketball player

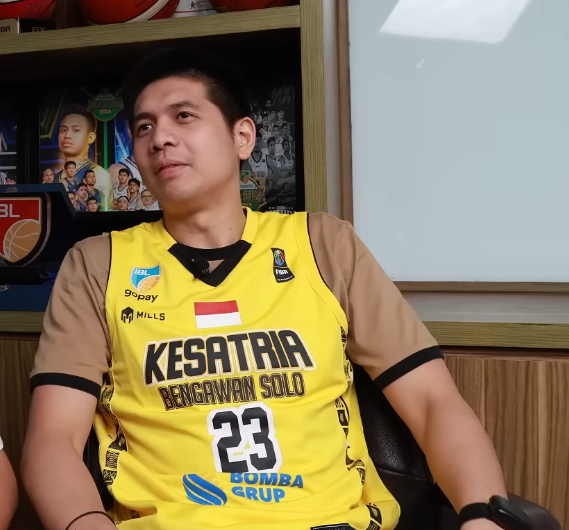
- Seputra in 2025

No. 23 – Kesatria Bengawan Solo
- Position: Shooting guard / small Forward
- League: IBL

Personal information
- Born: 18 May 1994 (age 32) Surabaya, Indonesia
- Listed height: 190 cm (6 ft 3 in)
- Listed weight: 81 kg (179 lb)

Career information
- High school: Intan Permata Hati (Surabaya, Indonesia)
- College: Krida Wacana Christian University
- Playing career: 2012–present

Career history
- 2012-2025: Satria Muda Pertamina
- 2025-present: Kesatria Bengawan Solo

Career highlights
- 4× IBL/NBL Indonesia champion (2015, 2018, 2021, 2022); 2× IBL All-Star (2018, 2025)

Avan Seputra (born May 18, 1994) is an Indonesian professional basketball player for the Kesatria Bengawan Solo of the Indonesian Basketball League (IBL).

== Professional career ==
Avan signed with Satria Muda Pertamina in 2012 shortly after he graduated from high school.

With the support of the Satria Muda management, represented by Christian Ronaldo Sitepu, they saw Avan's strong desire to develop. Because of that, Avan took a short break from the 2024 IBL season, to sharpen his basketball skills in Houston, Texas, where he is trained by former Satria Muda player, Mario Wuysang.

On his comeback for Indonesian basketball, specifically in the IBL All-Indonesian Cup, on a 72–67 win against Kesatria Bengawan Solo, he recorded a double-double with 14 points and 13 rebounds.

== National team career ==
Participated in the 2019 SEA Games as a member of the Indonesian national team.
