= Aven Ryan Pratama =

Indonesian basketball player

No. 14 – Kesatria Bengawan Solo
- Position: Power forward
- League: IBL

Personal information
- Born: 14 June 2004 (age 22) Banyuwangi, Indonesia
- Listed height: 1.94 m (6 ft 4 in)

Career information
- High school: SMAN 1 Genteng (Banyuwangi, Indonesia); Nation Star Academy (Surabaya, Indonesia)
- College: Airlangga University
- Playing career: 2022–present

Career history
- 2022-2025: Pacific Caesar
- 2025-present: Kesatria Bengawan Solo

Career highlights
- IBL Rookie of the Year (2023)

Aven Ryan Pratama (born June 14, 2004) is an Indonesian professional basketball player for Kesatria Bengawan Solo of the Indonesian Basketball League (IBL).

== National team career ==
Pratama has represented the Indonesia men's national under-18 basketball team at several occasions. He was recently called up to the Indonesia national team training camp for the 2025 FIBA Asia Cup qualification.
