= Nuke Tri Saputra =

Indonesian basketball player

No. 3 – Kesatria Bengawan Solo
- Position: Point guard
- League: IBL

Personal information
- Born: 3 January 1995 (age 31) Pati, Indonesia
- Listed height: 178 cm (5 ft 10 in)
- Listed weight: 74 kg (163 lb)

Career information
- High school: SMAN 14 (Semarang, Indonesia)
- College: Atma Jaya Catholic University of Indonesia
- Playing career: 2016–present

Career history
- 2016-2019: Pacific Caesar
- 2019-2021: Bima Perkasa Jogja
- 2021-2022: RANS PIK Basketball
- 2022-2023: Bima Perkasa Jogja
- 2023-present: Kesatria Bengawan Solo

Career highlights
- All-IBL Indonesian Third Team (2020); IBL All-Star (2020); IBL Skill-challenge champion (2018); IBL Most Improved Player of the Year (2018)

Nuke Tri Saputra (born January 3, 1995) is an Indonesian professional basketball player for the Kesatria Bengawan Solo of the Indonesian Basketball League (IBL).

== High school career ==
Studied at SMAN 14 Semarang, he was selected as a DBL All-Star in 2011 that was held at Seattle, Washington.
