= Muhamad Arighi =

Indonesian basketball player

No. 1 – Pelita Jaya
- Position: Point guard / shooting guard
- League: IBL

Personal information
- Born: 12 February 1999 (age 27) Banjarmasin, Indonesia
- Listed height: 183 cm (6 ft 0 in)
- Listed weight: 80 kg (176 lb)

Career information
- High school: Kharisma Bangsa (South Tangerang, Indonesia)
- College: UPH
- Playing career: 2020–present

Career history
- 2020: Pelita Jaya
- 2020-2021: →Indonesia Patriots
- 2021-present: Pelita Jaya

Career highlights
- IBL champion (2024); 2× IBL All-Indonesian Cup champion (2022, 2024); All-IBL Indonesian First Team (2023); 4× IBL All-Star (2023-2026); All-IBL Rookie Team (2021); 2× LIMA champion (2017, 2018)

Muhamad Arighi Hadran Noor (born February 12, 1999) is an Indonesian professional basketball player for Pelita Jaya Bakrie of the Indonesian Basketball League (IBL). He played college basketball for the UPH Eagles.

== College career ==
Arighi played college basketball at Pelita Harapan University, with the UPH Eagles Basketball Team, from 2017 to 2020, winning them two LIMA Championships in 2017 and 2018 while playing alongside his former teammate at Pelita Jaya, Yesaya Saudale.

== National team career ==
Arighi has represented the Indonesia men's national basketball team at several events, such as the 2023 SEA Games, 2022 FIBA Asia Cup and also in the 2019 William Jones Cup.
