= Yonatan Kae =

Indonesian former basketball player

Free agent
- Position: Power forward / small forward

Personal information
- Born: 12 November 1998 (age 28) Bandung, Indonesia
- Listed height: 189 cm (6 ft 2 in)

Career information
- College: Widya Mandala Catholic (2017–2022)
- Playing career: 2017–present

Career history
- 2017–2025: Pacific Caesar

Career highlights
- IBL All-Star (2022)

Yonatan Kaemingk (born 12 November 1998) is an Indonesian professional basketball player. He played a total of eight seasons for Pacific Caesar before leaving the club in September 2025. He is also a personal trainer.

== Professional career ==
Yonatan joined Pacific Caesar after graduating high school. He initially felt pressure, as he was facing more experienced players. In the 2020 season, Yonatan was trusted with more playing time for Pacific. Coached by David Singleton, he averaged 15.9 minutes per game.

At the 2021 IBL season, Yonatan averaged 10.25 PPG, and 7.56 rebounds per game.

Yonatan left Pacific Caesar on 15 September 2025, after 8 seasons playing for them. He is currently a free agent.
