= Brandone Francis =

Dominican basketball player (born 1994)

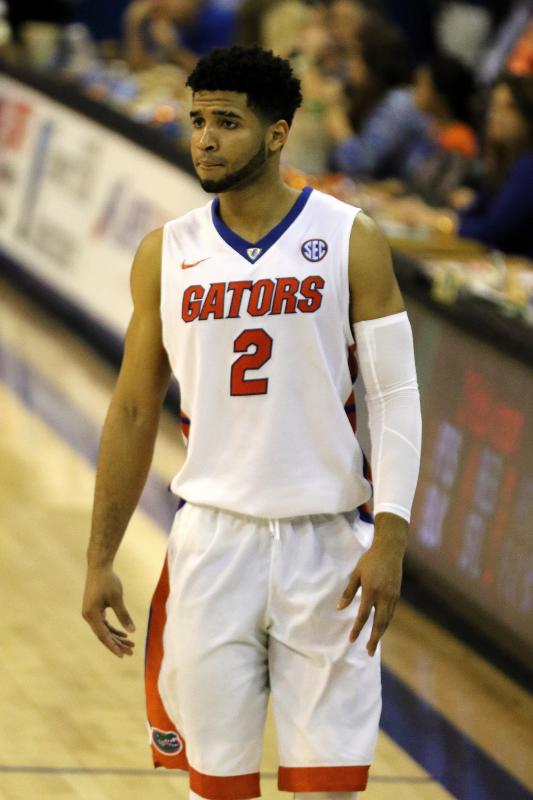
- Francis with Florida in 2015

No. 1 – Manama Club
- Position: Shooting guard / small forward
- League: Bahraini Premier League

Personal information
- Born: September 10, 1994 (age 32) La Romana, Dominican Republic
- Listed height: 6 ft 5 in (1.96 m)
- Listed weight: 215 lb (98 kg)

Career information
- High school: Arlington Country Day (Jacksonville, Florida)
- College: Florida (2015–2016); Texas Tech (2017–2019)
- NBA draft: 2019: undrafted
- Playing career: 2019–present

Career history
- 2019: Metros de Santiago
- 2019–2020: Iowa Wolves
- 2020–2021: Gipuzkoa
- 2021: Cafeteros de Armenia
- 2021: Metros de Santiago
- 2021: Bancola
- 2022: Búcaros de Bucaramanga
- 2022: Metros de Santiago
- 2022: Taurinos de Aragua
- 2022: Mauricio Báez
- 2022: Bancola
- 2023: Prawira Bandung
- 2023: Pueblo Nuevo
- 2024: La Tribu de Quisqueya
- 2024: Prawira Bandung
- 2024: Metros de Santiago
- 2024: Phoenix Fuel Masters
- 2025: Cañeros del Este
- 2025–2026: Rajawali Medan
- 2026–present: Manama Club

Career highlights
- IBL champion (2023); IBL Foreign Player of the Year (2023); All-IBL Second Team (2024); 3× IBL All-Star (2023, 2024, 2026); Nike Hoop Summit (2014)

Brandone Edward Francis Ramírez (born September 10, 1994) is a Dominican professional basketball player for Manama Club of the Bahraini Premier League. He played college basketball for the Texas Tech Red Raiders and the Florida Gators.

== College career ==
Francis redshirted his freshman season at Florida for academic reasons. As a redshirt freshman, he averaged two points in 10.8 minutes per game. Francis transferred to Texas Tech, sitting out his following season due to National Collegiate Athletic Association (NCAA) transfer rules. As a junior, Francis averaged 5.1 points and 1.9 rebounds per game. In the 2019 NCAA Division I championship game, his final college appearance, he scored a team-high 17 points in an 85–77 overtime loss to first-seeded Virginia. As a senior, Francis averaged 6.5 points, 2.4 rebounds and 1.4 assists per game.

== Professional career ==
On August 15, 2019, Francis was selected by Metros de Santiago with the first overall pick in the Dominican Liga Nacional de Baloncesto draft. One week later, he signed his first professional contract with the team. Francis led Metros to the league championship game. In 21 appearances, he averaged 11.3 points per game. On November 20, 2019, Francis signed with the Iowa Wolves of the NBA G League. In 20 games, he averaged 2.8 points in 8.4 minutes per game. Francis tested positive for and recovered from COVID-19 in June 2020. On August 9, he signed with Gipuzkoa of the Spanish Liga ACB.

In 2022, Francis signed for Prawira Harum Bandung of the Indonesian Basketball League (IBL). In regular season, he averaged 23.9 points, 6.5 rebounds, and 2.8 assists per game in 25.3 minutes per game, earning him IBL Foreign Player of The Year as well as leading Prawira Harum Bandung to their first ever championship since 1998. He recorded his IBL career high in a 78–61 win against RANS PIK Basketball scoring 41 points on 12-of-26 shooting and 15 from 21 from free throw line.

On February 14, 2024. Prawira Harum Bandung announced that Francis would return for the rest of 2023–24 season after a disappointing performance for the team through five games of the season in which they went 2–3. In his return debut, Francis scored 16 points and 5 rebounds on 5-of-10 shooting in 82–78 win against Borneo Hornbills

On September 2, 2024, Francis signed the Phoenix Fuel Masters of the Philippine Basketball Association (PBA) to replace Jayveous McKinnis as the team's import for the 2024 PBA Governors' Cup.

== Personal life ==
Francis' father, Bobby, played college basketball for Boston College in the 1980s. Bobby later worked as a brand strategist in the entertainment industry, developing a close relationship with rapper Nipsey Hussle. Francis' mother, Kenia Ramírez, lives in the Dominican Republic. He met her for the first time in two years during senior night at Texas Tech in 2019.
