= Willie Kemp (basketball) =

American professional basketball player (born 1987)

Personal information
- Born: January 1, 1987 (age 39) Bolivar, Tennessee, U.S.
- Listed height: 6 ft 2 in (1.88 m)
- Listed weight: 185 lb (84 kg)

Career information
- High school: Central (Bolivar, Tennessee)
- College: Memphis (2006–2010)
- NBA draft: 2010: undrafted
- Playing career: 2010–2019
- Position: Point guard / shooting guard
- Number: 6, 5, 1

Career history
- 2010–2011: Dakota Wizards
- 2011–2012: Etoile du Sahe
- 2012–2013: Astrum Levice
- 2013–2014: CS Gaz Metan Mediaş
- 2014: BK Ventspils
- 2014–2015: Trefl Sopot
- 2015: BC Mureș
- 2015–2017: Sigal Prishtina
- 2018: APOEL
- 2018: Keravnos
- 2018–2019: Dinamo București

Career highlights
- Latvian League champion (2014); Tennessee Mr. Basketball (2006)

Willie Devale Kemp (born January 1, 1987) is an American former professional basketball player. He played college basketball for the Memphis Tigers.

== Playing career ==
=== High school ===
Named 2006 Tennessee's Class AA Mr. Basketball ... Also named The Jackson Sun All-West Tennessee Player of the Year ... Averaged 18.8 points, 5.4 rebounds and 7.7 assists in helping lead Bolivar Central to a 29–11 overall record and a spot in the Class AA state quarterfinals ... Led Bolivar Central to a 117–25 record in his four varsity seasons ... Scored over 1,900 points and dished out over 800 assists in his prep career ... Helped lead Bolivar Central to back-to-back Tennessee Class AA state titles in 2004 and 2005 ... Named Class AA Tournament MVP in 2005 ... Was a Tennessee Class AA Mr. Basketball finalist in 2005 ... Named to the All-West Tennessee first team as a sophomore and junior ... Also selected All-West Tennessee Newcomer of the Year in 2003 ... Prior to senior year, named to HoopScoopOnline.com All-America team ... Rated No. 6 point guard in the nation by Scout.com ... Rivals.com ranked him the No. 46 player in the nation, No. 6 point guard in the country, and No. 4 player in Tennessee ... Played in Derby Festival Classic in April 2006 ... Had 13 points and eight assists in Memphis All-Star Classic in April 2006 ... Averaged 20.0 points, 4.0 rebounds and 7.0 assists as a junior.

=== College ===
Kemp played his college basketball at the University of Memphis. He was part of Memphis Tigers team that made 2008 NCAA Finals.

=== 2006–07 ===
Played in all 37 games and started 36 ... Only missed start came on the Tigers' Senior Day (Clyde Wade started in his place) ... Averaged 6.4 points, 2.3 rebounds and 2.2 assists ... Shot 38.1 percent from the field, 38.6 percent from the three-point line and 41 percent from the free throw line

=== 2007–08 ===
Played in all 40 games, setting the school record for most games played in a single season (holds record with Chris Douglas-Roberts, Derrick Rose and Antonio Anderson) ... Came off bench as team's sixth man ... Averaged 5.0 points, 1.0 rebounds and 1.5 assists ... Had a 3:1 assist-to-turnover ratio (60 assists/20 turnovers) ... Averaged only 0.04 turnovers per minutes played (20 turnovers/552 minutes) ... Had only three games with two or more turnovers ... Recorded no turnovers in 24 games ... Was second on the team with 51 three-pointers made ... Shot 38.3 percent from the floor and 36.7 percent from the three-point arc

=== 2008–09 ===
Played in 36 of the Tigers' 37 games ... Made two starts ... Averaged 2.9 points, 0.9 rebounds and 1.2 assists ... Had one blocked shot and 33 steals ... Shot 28.3 percent from the floor and 63.6 percent from the free throw line

=== 2009–10 ===
Played in all 34 games and made 26 starts ... Played 1,033 minutes, the most for a single season in his career ... Posted career highs for a season for points (251), scoring average (7.4), assists (145), assists average (4.3) and steals (51) ... Shot a career-best (season) 38.5 percent from the field and 64.6 percent from the free throw line ... Shot 37.1 percent from the three-point arc ... Ranked among Conference USA leaders in assists (8th), steals (14th) and assist-to-turnover ratio (4th)

=== Professional ===
In February 2014, he signed with BK Ventspils. At the end of the season he helped Ventspils to win Latvian Basketball League championship.

In August 2014, he signed with Trefl Sopot of Polish Basketball League.

In November 2016 he won the Arabian cup of the champions clubs with Etoile Sportive du Sahel (basketball).

== The Basketball Tournament ==
Willie Kemp played for Team Memphis State in the 2018 edition of The Basketball Tournament. He averaged 3.5 points per game, 1.5 assists per game and 1.5 rebounds per game. Team Memphis State reached the second round before falling to Team DRC.
