= Kevin Moses Poetiray =

Indonesian basketball player

Kevin Moses
No. 22 – Kesatria Bengawan Solo
- Position: Shooting guard
- League: IBL

Personal information
- Born: 3 May 1995 (age 31) Jakarta, Indonesia
- Listed height: 6 ft 0 in (1.83 m)
- Listed weight: 181 lb (82 kg)

Career information
- High school: SMA 1 PSKD (Jakarta, Indonesia)
- College: Esa Unggul University
- Playing career: 2017–present

Career history
- 2017-2019: Siliwangi Bandung
- 2019-2021: Louvre Surabaya
- 2021-2023: Dewa United Surabaya
- 2023-present: Kesatria Bengawan Solo

Career highlights
- All-IBL Indonesian Second Team (2021); IBL All-Star (2024); IBL Most Improve Player of the Year (2021); IBL First Team Rookie (2018); LIMA All Academic Player (2015)

Kevin Moses Eliazer Poetiray (born May 3, 1995) is an Indonesian professional basketball player for the Kesatria Bengawan Solo of the Indonesian Basketball League (IBL). He was a member of the Indonesia men's national 3x3 team, and played at the 2017 FIBA 3x3 World Cup in France and 2023 SEA Games in Cambodia.
