= Kamani Johnson =

American basketball player

Free agent
- Position: Small forward / power forward

Personal information
- Born: March 10, 2000 (age 26) Brooklyn, New York, U.S.
- Listed height: 6 ft 7 in (2.01 m)
- Listed weight: 230 lb (104 kg)

Career information
- High school: Montverde Academy (Montverde, Florida); Holy Spirit Prep (Atlanta, Georgia)
- College: Little Rock (2018–2020); Arkansas (2021–2023)
- NBA draft: 2023: undrafted
- Playing career: 2024–present

Career history
- 2024: Pacific Caesar
- 2024–2025: Memphis Hustle

Career highlights
- Third-team All-Sun Belt (2019)

Kamani Kevin Ano Johnson (born March 10, 2000), is an American professional basketball player, who most recently played for the Memphis Hustle of the NBA G League. He played college basketball for the Arkansas Razorbacks and the Little Rock Trojans.

== Professional career ==
=== Pacific Caesar (2023) ===
After going undrafted in the 2023 NBA draft, Johnson started his professional career as he signed with Pacific Caesar of the Indonesian Basketball League (IBL) on December 7, 2023. But only after playing two matches for them, Pacific Caesar waived him on January 20, 2024.

=== Memphis Hustle (2024–2025) ===
After joining the New York Knicks for the 2024 NBA Summer League, he was acquired by the Memphis Hustle on October 26, 2024, in the NBA G League draft.

== Personal life ==
He is the younger brother of former Kentucky Wildcats center and Oklahoma City Thunder player, Dakari Johnson.
