= Jarred Shaw =

American basketball player (born 1990)

Personal information
- Born: September 28, 1990 (age 36) Dallas, Texas, U.S.
- Listed height: 6 ft 11 in (2.11 m)
- Listed weight: 235 lb (107 kg)

Career information
- High school: David W. Carter (Dallas, Texas)
- College: Oklahoma State (2009–2011); Utah State (2012–2014)
- NBA draft: 2014: undrafted
- Playing career: 2014–present
- Position: Power forward / center

Career history
- 2014–2015: Ankara DSİ
- 2015–2016: Santa Cruz Warriors
- 2016: Hispano Americano
- 2016: Club Africain
- 2017: Hi-Tech
- 2017–2018: Fukushima Firebonds
- 2018–2019: Goes
- 2019: Panteras de Miranda
- 2019: Metropolitanos de Mauricio Baez
- 2019–2020: Dorados de Chihuahua
- 2020: Trouville
- 2021: Soles de Ojinaga
- 2021: Metropolitanos de Mauricio Baez
- 2022: Duba Club
- 2022: Hebraica Macabi
- 2022: Gigantes de Guayana
- 2022: Homenetmen Beirut
- 2022–2023: Prawira Bandung
- 2023–2024: Satria Muda Pertamina
- 2024–2025: Tangerang Hawks

Career highlights
- IBL champion (2023); IBL All-Star (2024); Tunisian league champion (2016)

Jarred Dwayne Shaw (born September 28, 1990) is an American professional basketball player who last played for the Tangerang Hawks of the Indonesian Basketball League (IBL). He played college basketball for the Utah State Aggies.

== Professional career ==
On October 31, 2015, Shaw was selected by the Santa Cruz Warriors with the 18th overall pick in the 2015 NBA Development League Draft. He signed for Dorados de Chihuahua of the Liga Nacional de Baloncesto Profesional (LNBP) in August 2019. In February 2020 he signed for Club Trouville of Montevideo, Uruguay, and played during the 2019–20 LUB season.

On May 7, 2025, Shaw, who was playing for Indonesia's Tangerang Hawks, was arrested after 132 pieces of cannabis candies believed to have originated from Thailand were discovered in a raid on his apartment in Tangerang Regency. The Hawks immediately released him, and the Indonesian Basketball League banned him for life.

On March 6, 2026, it was reported that Shaw remained in an Indonesian prison and was facing a health crisis, as well as suffering from Crohn's disease, causing him to have lost 40 pounds during his time incarcerated.

== Career statistics ==
Legend
GP	Games played	GS	Games started	MPG	Minutes per game
FG%	Field goal percentage	3P%	3-point field goal percentage	FT%	Free throw percentage
RPG	Rebounds per game	APG	Assists per game	SPG	Steals per game
BPG	Blocks per game	PPG	Points per game	**Bold**	Career high

Year	Team	GP	GS	MPG	FG%	3P%	FT%	RPG	APG	SPG	BPG	PPG
2017–18	Fukushima	59	24	18.3	.496	.280	.696	5.3	0.8	0.4	0.6	11.8
