= Veronica Koman =

Indonesian lawyer and human right activist

Veronica Koman (born 14 June 1988) is an Indonesian human rights activist and lawyer, known for disseminating information on Papua and West Papua provinces. She was awarded the Sir Ronald Wilson Human Rights Award in October 2019.

== Biography ==
Koman was born in Medan, North Sumatra on 14 June 1988. She graduated from the faculty of law at Pelita Harapan University. In 2016, she received an Indonesian government scholarship to continue studying at the Australian National University, graduating with a masters in law in July 2019. Outside of her activism on Papua, she also worked as a lawyer for asylum seekers from Afghanistan and Iran. In May 2017, she participated in a demonstration urging for the release of former Jakarta governor Basuki Tjahaja Purnama from prison, and gave a speech criticizing Joko Widodo's government.

In September 2019, Indonesian police named Koman a suspect under the country's information and electronic transactions law for alleged "provocation" and for "spreading hoaxes". She was in Australia at the time and declined to return to Indonesia. Indonesia threatened to ask Interpol to issue a red notice for her arrest.
