= David Singleton (basketball) =

American basketball coach (born 1988)

Dewa United Banten
- Position: Head coach
- League: IBL

Personal information
- Born: 3 January 1988 (age 38) San Francisco, California, U.S.

Career information
- High school: Salesian (Richmond, California)
- Coaching career: 2014–present

Career history

Coaching
- 2014–2015: Salesian Prep (assistant)
- 2015–2016: Nelson Giants (assistant)
- 2016: Cantho Catfish
- 2017–2019: Saigon Heat
- 2020: Pacific Caesar
- 2021: Bima Perkasa Jogja
- 2021: Fraser Valley Bandits
- 2022–2025: Prawira Bandung
- 2025–2026: Pelita Jaya Jakarta
- 2025–2026: Indonesia
- 2026–present: Dewa United Banten

Career highlights
- As head coach: IBL champion (2023); 5× IBL All-Star Game head coach (2022- 2026); 4× IBL Coach of the Year (2021-2024); VBA champion (2019)
Medals
Men's basketball
Head coach for Indonesia
SEA Games
Bronze medal – third place	2025 Thailand	Team

David "Dave" Reynard Singleton (born January 3, 1988), is an American basketball coach who is the head coach of Dewa United Banten of the Indonesian Basketball League (IBL). Dave won the IBL Coach of the Year award three times in a row, the first in IBL history. In the 2023 IBL season he won the championship with Prawira since their last title in 1998.

== Personal life ==
Dave grew up in Oakland, California, gained his competitive spirit and love for sports from his family. His older brother, Steve, once played for the Minnesota Twins in the Major League Baseball.

He used to be an American football athlete at his college, Tiffin University.

== Coaching career ==
=== (2014–2015) ===
His first coaching job was an assistant coach at his former school, Salesian College Preparatory, at Richmond, California, in 2014. A year later, Dave was offered to coach in the New Zealand League.

=== (2015–2016) ===
Tim Fanning, his neighbor and brother's colleague, trained Nelson Giants for the 2015–2016 season. Dave was invited to become an assistant coach, and he accepted the new challenge.

=== (2016, 2017–2019) ===
With Fanning's help, Dave made connections in Vietnam. His career skyrocketed in the VBA, in his last year, in the 2019 season he won the championship with the Saigon Heat.

=== (2020, 2021) ===
His career skyrocketed in Vietnam, then caught the attention of IBL clubs, during his time with Pacific Caesar and Bima Perkasa Jogja is where he won his first IBL Coach of the Year award.

Dave briefly was the head coach of CEBL side, Fraser Valley Bandits.

=== (2022–present) ===
In 2022, Dave joined Prawira Bandung and immediately in his second year he made an impact, winning the championship, the last time a Bandung representative won the league since 1998.

=== (2025-present) ===
On April 21, 2025, surprising news as Dave is selected as the head coach for the Indonesia national team for preparation of the 2025 SEA Games and the 2026 Asian Games.
