= Cassiopeia Manuputty =

Indonesian basketball player

Free agent
- Position: Point guard

Personal information
- Born: 5 February 1994 (age 32) Bekasi, Indonesia
- Listed height: 5 ft 11 in (1.80 m)
- Listed weight: 77 kg (170 lb)

Career information
- High school: Pelita Harapan College (South Tangerang, Indonesia)
- College: UPH
- Playing career: 2017–present

Career history

Playing
- 2017-2020: Satya Wacana Saints
- 2021-2022: West Bandits Solo
- 2022-2025: Evos Thunder Bogor / Rajawali Medan

Coaching
- 2025-2026: Tunas Bangsa Christian Gading Serpong School
- 2026-present: MVP Basketball Academy

Career highlights
- LIMA champion (2015)

Cassiopeia "Cio" Thomas Manuputty (born May 2, 1994) is an Indonesian professional basketball player who last played for the Rajawali Medan of the Indonesian Basketball League (IBL). He played college basketball for the UPH Eagles.

== Early career ==
He has represented the province of West Java in several national tournaments. And in the 2016 Pekan Olahraga Nasional he won the gold medal for basketball.

== Personal life ==
His sister is badminton player Bellaetrix Manuputty.
