= Pacific Caesar =

Pacific Caesar Surabaya
- 2026 IBL Indonesia
- Leagues: Kobatama/PBL; 1992–2000, 2010; IBL/NBL; 2011–present FilBasket; 2022
- Founded: 1968
- History: Pacific Caesar; 1968–2022, 2023–present Elang Pacific Caesar; 2023
- Arena: GOR Pacific Caesar
- Capacity: 2,500
- Location: Surabaya, East Java, Indonesia
- Team colors: Green
- President: Bambang Susanto
- Head coach: Dhimaz Anis Setiaputra
- Championships: 0
Home	Away	Third

Pacific Caesar Surabaya is a professional basketball team based in Surabaya, Indonesia. The club is one of the oldest basketball club in the country. For most of their existence, the club was an amateur basketball club until they joined KOBATAMA in 1992 until 2000. They joined the NBL Indonesia (currently IBL Indonesia) in 2011–12 season. Ever since then, they competed in the highest level of Indonesian basketball, IBL.

== History ==
Pacific Caesar original logo

=== Founding ===
Pacific Caesar Surabaya is one of the oldest basketball clubs in Indonesia. After stumbling through the Indonesian professional basketball league, they are now one of the most promising clubs. The existence of Pacific Caesar as a basketball club is also not in doubt, because they have been more than half a century. Club Pacific was founded in 1968. To be precise, on May 8, 1968, as an amateur club. Pacific was founded by Bambang Susanto since he was 17 years old, and continues to manage this club until now. Pak Bambang's dream of establishing Pacific was actually simple. He wanted to set up a basketball school for young people, and now Pacific was complete as a club. Have a professional team, coaching that go hand in hand, and a sports hall as the main supporting facilities.

=== KOBATAMA/PBL era ===
Pacific's journey in professional basketball competition began in 1992 at the Main Basketball Competition (Kobatama). Apart from Pacific, there were teams from East Java, namely Golden Hand and Halim Kediri. After running for a long time, Pacific declared retirement from the league for a decade (2000–2010).

They had tried their luck in the Premier Basketball League (PBL). In the 2010-2011 PBL season, Pacific was the runner-up. Pacific finally returned to the highest caste of Indonesian basketball.

=== NBL/IBL era ===
Pacific began to appear again on the national basketball scene to be precise at the 2011–2012 NBL Indonesia. But during its four years of participation, Pacific always failed to get positive results. Pacific always inhabits the bottom of the standings in the regular season. Various ways have been done by Pacific to improve performance, such as changing coaches. Pacific was once polished by a coach from the Philippines, Arturo Lozada Cristobal.

Then in the following season (2012-2013) they were led by Eddy Santoso. The two coaches took turns handling Pacific in the next two seasons. However, the last one who coached Pacific at NBL Indonesia 2014-2015 was Arturo Lozada Cristobal. At IBL 2016, Pacific Caesar appeared with a new face. Coach Bai (Arturo Lozada Cristobal) is no longer head coach. Pacific is handled by Bambang Susanto himself, who is also the owner of the club. Suk Fuk - his nickname - was accompanied by an assistant coach, the late Hari Suharsono. The results are the same, Pacific has yet to get maximum results. Because they appear with new faces of young players.

Pacific's performance improved sharply during the 2017 IBL era. They benefited from a league policy that included two foreign players. Pacific management is very careful in choosing players. They got a guard from the United States, David Seagers, and forward from Canada, Kevin Loiselle. Their presence succeeded in bringing Pacific to the top, as well as for the first time Pacific was able to appear in the playoffs. Bish as a coach was also nominated for the IBL 2016 Coach of The Year. Unfortunately they failed to continue their steps after losing two games in the playoffs from Aspac Jakarta.

Elang Pacific Caesar logo for the 2023 IBL season

Pacific achieved notable success in the two following seasons. The team qualified for the playoffs in the 2017–18 IBL season and advanced to the semifinals in the 2018–19 IBL season. Pacific is no longer regarded as one of the weaker teams in the league; it has since developed into one of the stronger contenders in Indonesian basketball. Although the club's recent accomplishments have drawn attention, Pacific possesses a long history and a record of significant achievements.

In January 2020, Pacific launched a new logo to mark a new decade of Pacific's participation in the IBL and to signify its new ambition to be a mainstay in the IBL's title race.

For the 2023 IBL season, Pacific announced a partnership alongside a club from Medan, Methodist 2 Hawks on September 19, 2023. With this partnership, the club changed its name for the season to Elang Pacific Caesar Surabaya.

== NBL/IBL record ==
Seasons	W	L	Pos	Play-off
2010-11	No NBL Participation			
2011-12	9	24	9th Place	-
2012-13	7	26	10th Place	-
2013-14	6	27	11th Place	-
2014-15	3	30	12th Place	-
IBL Season
Seasons	W	L	Pos	Play-off
2015-16	1	33	12th Place	-
2016-17	9	8	6th Place	Play-off
2017-18	11	6	4th Place	Play-off
2018-19	7	11	3rd Place	Play-off
2020	5	8	6th Place	-
2021	1	15	6th Place	-
2022	9	13	11th Place	-
2023	6	24	15th Place	-

== Roster ==
Note: Flags indicate national team eligibility at FIBA-sanctioned events. Players may hold other non-FIBA nationalities not displayed.

Pacific Caesar roster
Players
Coaches

Pos.	No.	Nat.	Name	Ht.
PG	0	(Indonesia)	R. Azzaryan Pradhitya	1.81 m (5 ft 11 in)
PG	1	(United States)	Xavier Cannefax (I)	1.84 m (6 ft 0 in)
PG	3	(Indonesia)	Frederico Darmawan	1.73 m (5 ft 8 in)
G/F	7	(Indonesia)	Gregorio Wibowo (C)	1.82 m (6 ft 0 in)
SG	8	(Indonesia)	Muhammad Ariezky	1.85 m (6 ft 1 in)
PG	9	(Indonesia)	Daffa Dhoifullah	1.85 m (6 ft 1 in)
PF	10	(United States)	Gregoryshon Magee (I)	2.11 m (6 ft 11 in)
PF	15	(Indonesia)	Senakusuma Ibrahim	1.90 m (6 ft 3 in)
G/F	16	(Indonesia)	Muhammad Hardianto	1.80 m (5 ft 11 in)
PF	18	(Indonesia)	Darren Celosse	1.95 m (6 ft 5 in)
G/F	20	(Croatia)	Dino Butorac (I)	1.93 m (6 ft 4 in)
C	21	(Indonesia)	Renard Hernando	2.06 m (6 ft 9 in)
F/C	25	(Malaysia)	Joseph Obasa (I)	2.06 m (6 ft 9 in)
PG	30	(Indonesia)	Danu Aprilianto	1.80 m (5 ft 11 in)
G/F	99	(Indonesia)	Christian Yudha	1.85 m (6 ft 1 in)

Head coach

- (Indonesia) Dhimas Aniz Setiaputra

Assistant coach(es)

- (Indonesia) M. Choirul Huda Pratama

Legend

- (C) Team captain
- (I) Import player
- (R) Rookie
- Injured

- Roster
Updated: 1 September 2026

=== Depth chart ===
Pos.	Starting 5	Bench 1	Bench 2
C	Joseph Obasa	Darren Celosse	Renard Hernando
PF	Gregoryshon Magee	Gregorio Wibowo	Senakusuma Ibrahim
SF	Xavier Cannefax	Dino Butorac	Christian Yudha
SG	Daffa Dhoifullah	Muhammad Ariezky	Muhammad Hardianto
PG	R. Azzaryan Pradhitya	Danu Aprilianto	Frederico Darmawan

== Pacific Caesar Legend's ==
- Ateng Sugianto
- Dian Heryadi
- Willy Winoto

== Awards ==
=== Defensive Player of The Year ===
1. Indra Muhammad (2020)

=== Rookie of the Year ===
1. Aven Ryan Pratama (2023)

== Notable coaches and players ==
=== Coaches ===
- Set a club record or won an individual award as a professional coach.
- Functioned as head coach for any senior national team at least once at an official international match.

- (United States) John Todd Purves

=== Players ===
To appear in this section a player must have either:

- Set a club record or won an individual award as a professional player.

- Played at least one official international match for his senior national team or one NBA game at any time.

- (Indonesia) Dian Heryadi
- (Indonesia) Indra Muhamad
- (Indonesia) Muhammad Nur Aziz Wardana
- (Canada) Nick Wiggins
- (Canada) Kevin Loiselle
- (United States) Kamani Johnson
- (United States) Keljin Blevins
- (Indonesia) Aven Ryan Pratama
- (Senegal) Malick Diouf
- (Croatia) Dino Butorac
- (Indonesia) Yonatan Kae
- (Philippines) Franky Johnson
