= Kesatria Bengawan Solo =

Indonesian basketball team

- 2026 IBL Indonesia
- Leagues: Indonesian Basketball League
- Founded: 2021; 5 years ago
- History: West Bandits Solo (2021–2023); Kesatria Bengawan Solo (2023–present)
- Arena: Sritex Arena
- Capacity: 4,000
- Location: Surakarta, Central Java
- Team colors: Black, Yellow, Cyan, White
- President: Yakup Putra Hasibuan
- Head coach: Efri Meldi
- Website: kesatriabengawansolo.com
Home	Away

Kesatria Bengawan Solo is an Indonesian professional basketball team. They are based in the city of Surakarta that competes in the Indonesian Basketball League (IBL).

On December 3 2023, Kesatria Bengawan Solo bought West Bandits Solo IBL license for the upcoming 2024 season.

== Notable players ==
- Set a club record or won an individual award as a professional player.
- Played at least one official international match for his senior national team at any time.

- (Indonesia) Nuke Tri Saputra
- (Indonesia) Samuel Devin Susanto
- (Indonesia) Kevin Moses Poetiray
- (Indonesia) Andre Andriano
- (United States) Kentrell Barkley
- (Indonesia) Anto Febryanto Boyratan
- (Indonesia) Ruslan
- (Taiwan) Will Artino
- (Ivory Coast) Deon Thompson
- (United States) Rashad Vaughn

== Roster ==
Kesatria Bengawan Solo roster
Players
Coaches

Pos.	No.	Nat.	Name	Ht.	Wt.
G	1	(Indonesia)	Nuke Tri Saputra	1.77 m (5 ft 10 in)	74 kg (163 lb)
F	2	(Indonesia)	Ferdian Dwi Purwoko	1.88 m (6 ft 2 in)	88 kg (194 lb)
SG	3	(Indonesia)	Bagus Dwi Cahyono	1.75 m (5 ft 9 in)	68 kg (150 lb)
PG	6	(Indonesia)	Abraham Wenas	1.74 m (5 ft 9 in)	70 kg (154 lb)
F	7	(Indonesia)	Aven Ryan Pratama	1.94 m (6 ft 4 in)
PG	8	(Indonesia)	Yordan Ezra (R)	1.72 m (5 ft 8 in)	69 kg (152 lb)
C	10	(Indonesia)	Argus Sanyudy	1.92 m (6 ft 4 in)	115 kg (254 lb)
G	11	(Indonesia)	Andre Rorimpandey	1.77 m (5 ft 10 in)	70 kg (154 lb)
F/C	13	(Indonesia)	Ponsianus Nyoman Indrawan	1.93 m (6 ft 4 in)	100 kg (220 lb)
C	14	(Indonesia)	Randy Ady Prasetya	2.02 m (6 ft 8 in)	77 kg (170 lb)
G/F	22	(Indonesia)	Kevin Moses Poetiray	1.84 m (6 ft 0 in)	82 kg (181 lb)
G/F	23	(Indonesia)	Avan Seputra	1.90 m (6 ft 3 in)	81 kg (179 lb)
SF	24	(United States)	Kentrell Barkley (I)	1.94 m (6 ft 4 in)	93 kg (205 lb)
SG	25	(United States)	Rayvonte Rice (I)	1.89 m (6 ft 2 in)	104 kg (229 lb)
G/F	33	(Indonesia)	Indra Muhamad	1.89 m (6 ft 2 in)	80 kg (176 lb)
C	34	(United States)	Chanceler James Gettys (I)	2.13 m (7 ft 0 in)	115 kg (254 lb)

Head coach

- (Serbia) Miloš Pejić

Assistant coach(es)

- (Indonesia) Efri Meldi
- (Indonesia) Ichsan Gigih Satria
- (Indonesia) Yullius Dobby Putrandana

Legend

- (C) Team captain
- (HP) Heritage player
- (R) Rookie
- Injured

- Roster
Updated: 26 January 2025,

=== Depth chart ===
Pos.	Starting 5	Bench
C	Argus Sanyudy	Ponsianus Nyoman Indrawan
PF	Deon Thompson	Aven Ryan Pratama
SF	Kentrell Barkley	Avan Seputra
SG	Rashad Vaughn	Nuke Tri Saputra
PG	Abraham Wenas	Andre Rorimpandey
