= List of schools in Indonesia =

This is a list of notable schools in Indonesia. This list is not intended to be complete, as there would be too many schools.

== Schools in Indonesia ==
In Indonesia, primary schools or SD (Indonesian: Sekolah Dasar—"Elementary School") are from 1st to 6th grade, while high schools (secondary school) generally comprise junior secondary school (7th–9th grade) or SMP (Indonesian: Sekolah Menengah Pertama—"First Middle-grade School"), senior secondary school (10–12th grade) or SMA (Indonesian: Sekolah Menengah Atas—"Upper Middle-grade School") or SMU (Indonesian: Sekolah Menengah Umum—"General Middle-grade School") and SMK (Indonesian: Sekolah Menengah Kejuruan—"Middle-grade Vocational School"), with virtually all public schools operated this way. Private schools may combine them, even though the students still wear different uniforms.

Public schools (SMPN, SMAN/SMUN, and SMKN, with "N" being Negeri or "State") employ standardized uniform outfits: red skirts and short trousers for primary schoolers, navy blue skirts and short trousers for junior secondary schoolers, and grey long skirts and long trousers for senior secondary schoolers. Vocational schools and some vocational schoolers add different uniform outfits. With some students wearing a white shirt on top. Private schools may choose different outfits for their students, but schools generally employ uniforms—sometimes several sets of them—including the Pramuka (boyscout) uniform, the batik uniform, etc. Public schools often, but not always, employ numbers in their names, corresponding to the order of their formation, e.g. SD/SMP/SMA Negeri 1/2/3, etc., followed by city/regency names, and usually don't carry personal names.

Before 2015, the mandatory time in school in Indonesia was 9 years, from 1st to 9th grade; therefore, senior secondary school was not mandatory. Since 2015, however, the mandatory school has been extended throughout the 12th grades. Tertiary schools (Indonesian: Sekolah tinggi—"High School") are college and university level.

Schools in Indonesia are under the care of the Ministry of Education and Culture, and for some period (2014–2019), the universities ("high" school or sekolah tinggi) are moved under the Ministry of Research and Technology. The religious schools are under the responsibility of the Ministry of Religion.

Religiously organized schools include Muslim, Christian, and Catholic private schools. Muslim schools uses Arabic terms in their names, like: Madrasah Ibtidaiyah (MI) = SD, Madrasah Tsanawiyah (MTs) = SMP, and Madrasah Aliyah (MA) = SMA. Christian schools use the abbreviation SDK, SMPK, SMAK/SMUK, or spelt out SD Kristen, SMP Kristen, or SMA Kristen in their names. Catholic schools use Saints (Santo) and Saintesses' (Santa) names in their school names or use Kolese (college) in their names. Secular schools didn't use any of the above and chose secular names. Vocational schools (mainly for senior secondary schools) are called SMK (Indonesian: Sekolah Menengah Kejuruan—"Vocational Middle-grade School"). Foreign-operated schools may use English, romanized Arabic, or Chinese (pinyin) names.

== Statistics of senior secondary schools ==
General schools

According to school year 2017–18 senior secondary school (SMA) statistics from Ministry of Education, in 2017, Indonesia has 13.495 SMA (almost 50-50 ratio between public and private schools) with more than 160 thousand total classrooms (around 12 classrooms per school) and 30 thousands laboratories and 11 thousands libraries, 1,6 million new/10th grade SMA students (45%–55% male-female ratio), 4.8 million total SMA students (averaging 356 students per school, almost evenly distributed between 10th, 11th, and slightly lower number of 12th graders), 1.4 million graduates (98.8% completion rates, 0.67% dropouts, 0.2% repeats), more than 300 thousands SMA headperson and teachers (averaging 22 teachers per school), and almost 60 thousand other non-teaching staff.

The most schools are in West Java and East Java (the most heavily populated provinces), with around 1.5 thousand each (671 and 535 thousand students, respectively), while the youngest province of Indonesia, North Kalimantan, has the fewest schools, 59, with 16 thousand students.

With regard to school time, almost all schools (92,1%) are morning schools, while 4,4% are evening schools, and the rest are a combination. With regard to religion, 79% of the students are Moslem, 12% Protestants, 5% Catholics, 2% Hindu, 1% Buddhist, with a very small minority (0.05%) of Confucianist religion, and other beliefs. With regard to preference for public/private schools, Moslem and Hindu students overwhelmingly favor public schools, Christians and Catholics somewhat prefer public schools, and Buddhists and Confucianists overwhelmingly favor private schools.

Teachers

In 2017, Indonesia had more than 300 thousands SMA teachers and headmasters/mistresses (41–59% male-female ratio), which is highly skewed towards public schools (72% teachers); among them, 156 thousand full-time teachers (more than 50%) have the coveted status of National Civil Servant (Pegawai Negeri Sipil—PNS), further split between 147 thousands (94% of PNS) teaching in public school and 8 thousands (6% of PNS) in private schools, while the rest of the teachers are privately employed (19%) or part-time teachers (31%). The majority of the teachers (98%) have a bachelor's degree or higher, are quite young (56% are 40 years old or younger, and only 7% are 56 years old or older), and are relatively new (56% have only worked for less than 10 years, while 14% have worked for more than 25 years). Their numbers have decreased by around 20% from two years ago (362 thousands). The average number of teachers per school is 23.

Students

In 2017, Indonesia had 4.8 million total SMA students, averaging 356 students per school in general, 519 students per public school, and 190 students per private school, with an average of 30 students per class and 16 students per teacher. The number of repeat-graders are 0.2% on average, and the number of dropouts are 0.67%, distributed around 25% 10th graders, 25% 11th graders, and 50% 12th graders with total of more than 31 thousand students (55–45% male-female ratio), which are lower than the previous two years (36 and 40 thousands, respectively). The average completion rate of SMA students is 98.8%.

From provincial statistics, the province with the most students per school is Bali (545), while the least is North Maluku (198), and the most teachers per school are West Sumatra (36) and Bali (34), and the least is North Maluku (15). But for private school, West Java has the most number of students per school (891), while private schools in Central Kalimantan only have 95 students per school.

== List of public primary schools ==
- SD Negeri 020 Sepaku

== List of private senior primary schools ==
Some of the English names of these schools are not necessarily official names, but merely translation. But most with official English names have influences based on international curriculums, international affiliations or religious affiliations.

- ACG School Jakarta
- AIS Indonesia
- Al-Izhar Pondok Labu
- ACS Jakarta
- Bandung Alliance Intercultural School
- Bina Bangsa School (培民学校)
- Blossom International School
- British School Jakarta
- Cendana Educational Foundation Schools, Riau
- Chandra Kusuma School, Medan
- Charis Global School, Lippo Cikarang, Bekasi, West Java
- Cita Hati Christian School, Surabaya
- Don Bosco Pondok Indah, Jakarta
- Gandhi Memorial International School
- German School Jakarta, BSD City
- Global Jaya School, Bintaro
- Gloria 1 Christian High School, Surabaya
- Jakarta Intercultural School, Jakarta
- Jakarta Japanese School, South Tangerang (ジャカルタ日本人学校)
- Jakarta Taipei School, Jakarta (雅加達台灣學校)
- Jakarta Theological Seminary, Jakarta
- Kolese Gonzaga, Jakarta
- Kolese Kanisius, Jakarta
- Kolese Loyola, Semarang, Central Java
- Lycée Français Louis-Charles Damais
- Manado International School, North Sulawesi
- New Zealand Independent School Jakarta
- North Jakarta International School, Jakarta
- Nurul Fikri Boarding School
- Raffles International Christian School
- Regina Pacis School, Palmerah, Jakarta Barat
- Saint Joseph's School, Malang
- Sekolah Dian Harapan, Tangerang, Jakarta
- Sekolah Dyatmika, Bali
- Sekolah High/Scope Indonesia
- Sekolah Menengah Atas Kristen Penabur Gading Serpong
- Sekolah Pelita Harapan, Jakarta
- Sinarmas World Academy, BSD City, Tangerang
- Singapore Intercultural School (SIS Group of Schools)
- St. Louis 1 Catholic High School, Surabaya
- SMU St. Angela
- Surabaya European School
- Surabaya Intercultural School, Surabaya, East Java
- Sutomo School, Medan (苏东中学)
- St. Ursula Catholic School, Jakarta
- St. Ursula School Bumi Serpong Damai
- Taruna Nusantara, Magelang, Central Java
- Telkom Sandhy Putra Vocational School, Medan, North Sumatera
- Trinitas Senior High School, Bandung, West Java
- Tzu Chi School （印尼慈濟學校）
- Wenhua Qiaoliang Trilingual National School (文化桥梁三语国民学校)
- Wijaya Putra School, Surabaya

== List of public major secondary high schools ==
- SMA Negeri 3 Bandung
- SMA Negeri 1 Blitar
- SMA Negeri 8 Jakarta
- SMA Negeri 1 Malang
- SMA Negeri 3 Padang
- SMA Negeri 5 Parepare
- SMA Negeri 1 Yogyakarta
- SMP Negeri 2 Sempor
- MAN 3 Kediri

== List of public senior vocational schools ==
- SMK Negeri 10 Bandung

== See also ==
- Education in Indonesia
- List of universities in Indonesia
- List of Indonesian agricultural universities and colleges
