= Telkom Vocational School (Medan) =

SMK TELKOM Sandhy Putra Medan

Location
- Jamin Ginting's St. #11,1 No.9C (Complex Telkom Company Tuntungan Area); Medan, North Sumatra, 20135; Indonesia; 3°31′23.55″N 98°37′15.15″E

Information
- Type: Independent, day school, vocational school, private school
- Established: 1992
- Status: International School, ISO 9001s Standard
- School district: Medan Tuntungan
- Specialist: Information and Communication Technology
- Principal: Ir. Januar
- Grades: 10-12
- Gender: Coeducational
- Enrollment: ± 4,350 (1992 - 2013)
- Language: Indonesian and English
- Houses: 4
- Website: smktelkommedan.sch.id

Telkom Vocational School Medan (Indonesian: Sekolah Menengah Kejuruan Telkom Medan; SMK Telkom Medan) is a vocational school specializing in Telecommunications and Information Engineering. It operates under the auspices of the Sandhykara Putra Telkom Foundation. The school holds ISO 9001 certification.

The school has received high accreditation scores, including a score of 97 in its Switching Engineering program and a score of 95 for its Computer and Network Engineering program.

The school collaborates with Cisco Systems through the Cisco Networking Academy Program.

The school is located on Jamin Ginting Street No. 9C, about 11.1 km from Medan’s city center. It is near Pancur Batu in North Sumatra and close to tourist areas like Greenhill and Hairos.

== Vocational school in Indonesia ==
Vocational school in Indonesia could be considered as high school with special focused courses. Because, in Indonesian vocational school, they still have the same must-learned subjects with the general high school. So, that is why some vocational school could have opportunity to continue their study to the college.

== History ==
Telkom Vocational School Medan was established in 1992, with the name of SMK Telkom Sandhy Putra Medan (Indonesian) and "Sandhy Putra Telecommunication Vocational School" (English). This school become the first vocational school in Indonesia which held a vocational education in the field of Telecommunication Engineering Program. Established by Telkom Sandhykara Putra Foundation whose owned by Indonesian Telecommunication Company, Telkom Indonesia. Telkom Sandhy Putra Vocational School Medan also simultaneously established in another city. Such as Jakarta, Bandung, Malang, Purwekerto and Banjarbaru.

There are four departments:

- Switching Engineering program
- Computer and Network Engineering
- Software Engineering
- Multimedia

In 2007, SMK Telkom Sandhy Putra Medan become the first International vocational school

In 2014, the school was renamed by the foundation and become SMK Telkom Medan (Indonesian) or Telkom Vocational School (English)

=== Curriculum ===
Its main curriculum follows Indonesian vocational school curriculum and Indonesian International Curriculum as known as Kurikulum RSBI (Rintisan Sekolah Bertaraf Internasional). Students are divided by the expertise according to the result of their interest and aptitude test and psychological test before enroll learning progress. Cisco Networking Academy is also implemented for addition of world class academy program. Telkom Vocational School is the only school which conduct Installation Fiber Optic in Sumatera.

=== Expertise and skills of graduates of each expertise ===
The study program has the goal of preparing students to enter the workforce and develop professionalism.

==== Switching Engineering ====
Students will be able to operate the STDI device, install and maintain PABX devices and able to follow the development of telecommunications technologies (Softswitch, STB). Outside of Java island, this program is only available in this school.

==== Computer and Networks Engineering ====
Students will be able to install and maintain PCs, create a network computer, and be Computer Technicians and Network Technicians.

==== Software Engineering ====
Students will be educated in software development, maintenance, and management.

==== Multimedia ====
Students will have knowledge of web development, game development, production, media and advertising. They will be able to use the computer to present and combine text, sound, images, animation, and video.

== Organization ==
- Board of Trustees "Sandhykara Putra Telkom Foundation :
  - Directors. TELKOM (the Company)
- Protector :
  - Chairman of the Board of Trustees "Sandhykara Putra Telkom Foundation" in London
- Management Schools (ISO 9001 Standard :
  - Principal : Ir. Januar

== Student life ==
Most of the students come from other regions, but this school is not boarding school. This school is surrounded by many boarding rooms, so the students could live there independently.

=== Sports ===
Basketball, futsal, volleyball, Taekwondo, badminton, softball and baseball. The Futsal team is named by Neax FC. Each year, the manager of Neax FC holds an event which named by Neax Competition. The Futsal competition is reserved for Telkom Sandhy Putra's students. Neax Competition is contesting between a class to other class in Futsal. Taekwondo is the only martial art club in the school.

=== Arts ===
- Theater

It was named by Semut Teater and established in April 2009. Semut Teater holds a theater festival by inviting theater clubs from other schools.

- Choir
- Traditional dance

The club specializes in Sumatera area. Traditional dances are performed in school events.

- Modern Dance

This club has three groups:

  - Lakers Dancer

Focused on modern dance, using electronic music or DJ music adapted from the USA.

  - New Flash Crew

Combines some kinds of modern dance, adapted from many other countries.

  - Wotagei

Wotagei is a group dance adapted from Japan. The group dancing in the glow and using light stick when modern Japanese music is played.

== Outdoor facilities ==
- Mosque
- Badminton Arena
- Volley Area
- Basketball Arena
- Futsal Field
- Music Studio
- Food Court
- Vehicle Parking
- Hostel

== Achievements ==
The total number of awards of Telkom Sandhy Putra Vocational School reached more than 170 posts, either in the form of a trophy, a plaque. And since July 2011 until presents, Telkom Sandhy Putra Vocational School has collected 44 achievement Levels.

Dominant achievement category:

- City championship:
  - English Competition (Speech, Story Telling, Scrabble)
  - Indonesian Debate
  - Paskibraka
  - Modern Dance
  - Futsal
- Provincial championship:
  - Theater
  - English Debate
  - Taekwondo
  - Softball & Baseball
  - Olympic Applied Science Technology
- National championship:
  - Basketball
  - Vocational Students Skills Competition in Information Technology and Communication

== See also ==
- Vocational School
- Private School
- ISO 9001
- CCNA
- Education in Indonesia
- List of schools in Indonesia

== Other Links ==
@ESA_Telkom(ESA di SMK TELKOM)on Twitter

SMK TELKOM Medan sends seven students to German

Telkom Akses Co. recruit fifty graduates students of SMK Telkom Sandhy Medan Putra (2013)

Full

FFA Road to School: SMK Telkom Sandy Putra Medan played Teenagers production Film

Miliki Jurusan yang tidak diajarkan di SMK Lain

Telkom Sandhy Putra Medan give Entrepreneurship lesson to their students
