= SMA Negeri 13 Bekasi =

State Senior High School 13 Bekasi
- Logo SMAN 13 Bekasi

Location
- Jalan Pariwisata Raya; Perum Bumi Bekasi Baru Utara, Rawa Lumbu; Bekasi, West Java 17115; Indonesia
- Coordinates: 6°16′5.50″S 107°0′17.46″E

Information
- Type: Public school
- Motto: Cipta, Rasa, Karya
- Established: 2005
- Principal: Nunung Nurhasanah, S.Pd, M. M.Pd
- Enrollment: 350/year

State Senior High School 13 Bekasi (Indonesian : Sekolah Menengah Atas Negeri 13 Bekasi) is a public senior high school in Bekasi, West Java, Indonesia. State Senior High School 13 Bekasi was established in 2005 and known as USB SMAN 13 Bekasi. It is located in Jalan Pariwisata Raya Perum Bumi Bekasi Baru Utara Rawalumbu.

== History ==
State Senior High School 13 Bekasi was established in 2005, through the decision of the Head of Education Office of Bekasi No. 421/1142 - Dik.2 dated June 5, 2005. The act was about to set a USB (id: Unit Sekolah Baru, En:New School Unit) SMA Negeri 13 Bekasi Located in District of Mustika Jaya, Bekasi.

== Facilities ==
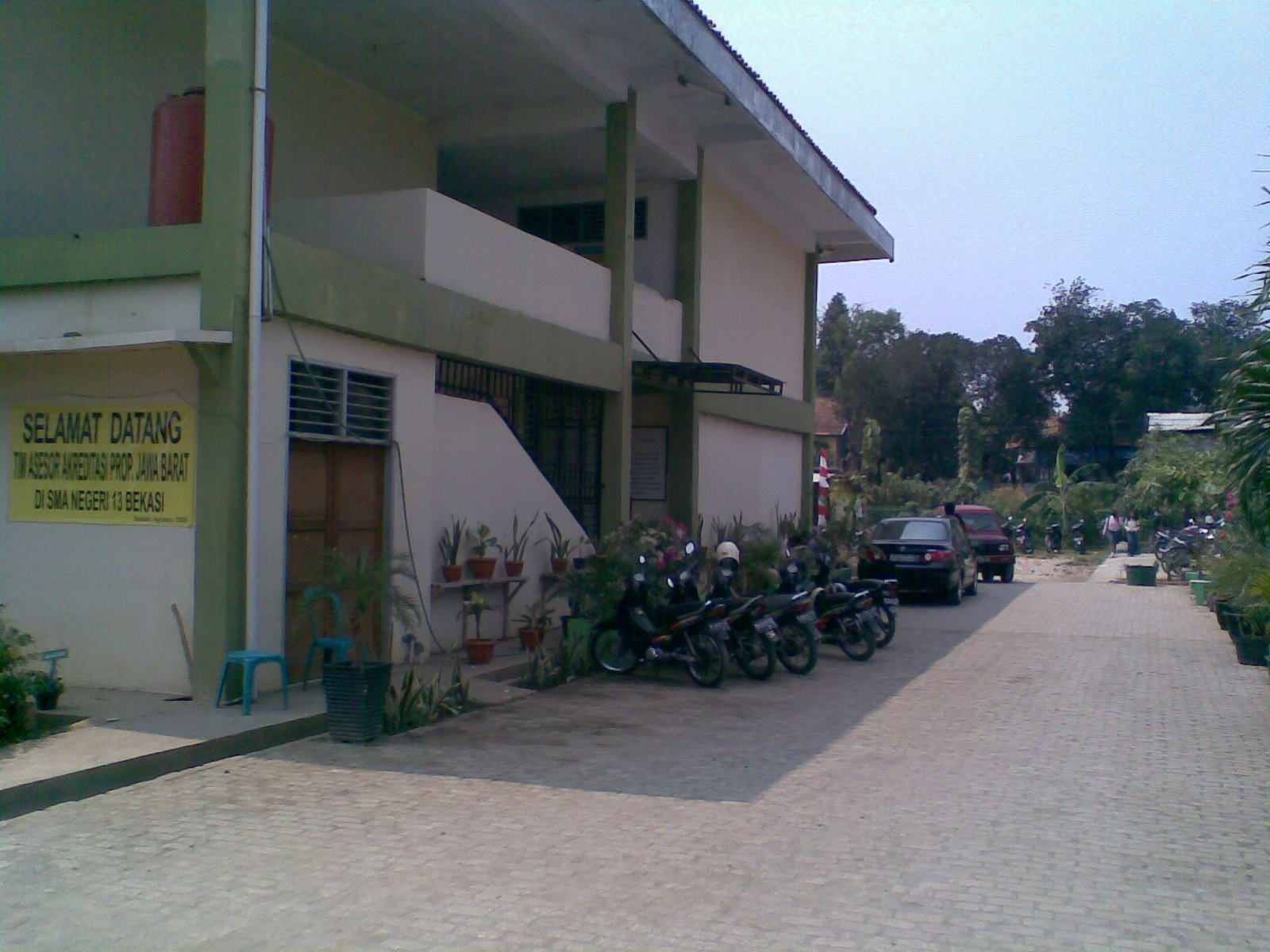
Main entrance of SMAN 13 Bekasi, as of 2011

- Toilet
- Toilet
- Mosque
- Library
- Language and Multimedia Laboratory
- Science Laboratory
- Computer Laboratory
- Headmaster room and Administration Office
- Teacher Office
- OSIS Room
- Counseling Room
- Koperasi Siswa (Student Cooperation)
- Canteen
- Flag Ceremonial field

== Extracurricular ==
- ROHIS (Rohani Islam)
- Pramuka/Scout (NURILAKA)
- Badminton
- Basketball
- Futsal
- Volleyball
- Japanese Club
- Karya Ilmiah Remaja (Youth Scientific Work) (KOSMIK)
- Taekwondo
- Music and Arts
- Mading
- Choir
- Paskibra Kopasgas
- English Club
- TALISTA (Tata Lingkungan Sekolah Kita)
- Klinik Pancasila

== See also ==
- Education in Indonesia
- List of schools in Indonesia
