= Canisius College, Jakarta =

Private secondary school in Central Jakarta, Indonesia

Canisius College
- Indonesian: Kolese Kanisius

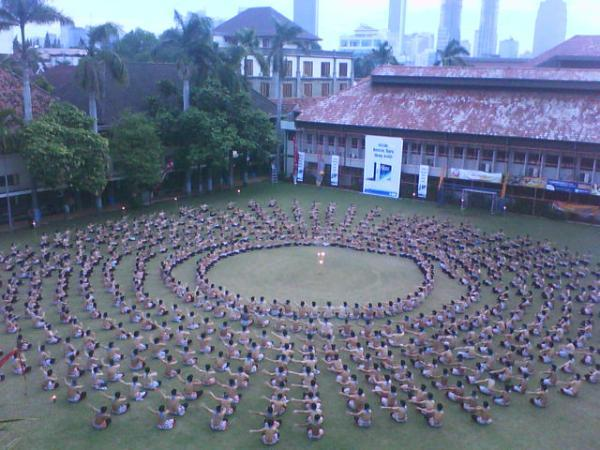
- Kecak dance during Canisius College Education Fair, one of the school's activities

Location
- Jalan Menteng Raya 64; Menteng, Central Jakarta, Java, 10340; Indonesia

Information
- Type: Private secondary school
- Motto: Latin: Ad Maiorem Dei Gloriam (For the Greater Glory of God)
- Religious affiliation: Catholicism
- Denomination: Jesuit
- Established: 1 June 1927; 98 years ago
- Founder: Fr. J. Kurris, SJ
- Rector: Fr Leonardus E. B. Winandoko, SJ, PhD (since 2022)
- Principal: Thomas Gunawan Wibowo, MEd (Junior High School: since 2022) (High School: since 2023)
- Colors: Blue and orange
- Preceded by: Strada Petrus Canisius MULO; Strada Petrus Canisius AMS
- Website: kanisius.sch.id

Canisius College (Indonesian: Kolese Kanisius) is a private Catholic secondary school for boys, located in Menteng, Central Jakarta, Java, Indonesia. The school was founded by the Indonesian Province of the Society of Jesus in 1927.

== Administration structure ==
The school is led by a rector, who oversees the senior and junior high school directors (principals). Each principal has three vice principals, one each for curricular affairs, general affairs, and student affairs, the last one more commonly known as the prefect inside the school. The rector, principals, and prefects traditionally are ordained Jesuit priests.

== History ==
=== 1927–1931 ===
Canisius' history began on 26 October 1926, with the arrival of Dr. J. Kurris, its first director. On 1 June 1927, the first class of AMS (Algemene Middelbare School) was started in a plot of land at Mentengweg. The plot of land included a 19th-century Indies Empire house where the school initially operated. The construction continued, and a new plot of land was bought. The land was intended to be used as the construction site of a new house. The construction was finished on 1 July 1929. On 26 October 1931, Canisius College achieved official status with the appointment of Fr. A. van Hoof, SJ, as its first rector.

=== 1931–1942 ===
In the year 1938, Canisius College was changed from AMS education system to HBS education system.

=== 1942–1946 ===
During World War II, all activities were suspended and the college was used as a public high school. In reality, there wasn't any activity in the school, due to the situation of Jakarta.

After Japan surrendered to the Allies and the Dutch forces returning to Indonesia as the NICA, Canisius was reopened on 1 January 1946. Even though the school was given the freedom to continue its activity by the NICA, the school showed resistance to NICA and supporting the Indonesian Government. The flagpole on Canisius flew the Indonesian flag. This caused the school to be partly occupied by paratroopers. When the paratroopers were replaced by the Gurkha Army, Canisius was able to re-obtain all of its territory, and re-obtained the whole building one year later.

=== 1946–1949 ===
After the reopening of Canisius, a new rector was appointed : Fr. Lodewijk Ingenhousz. Ingenhousz proposed a national focused curriculum and proposed that the Indonesian language should be used as the main language in the school. This proposal met a resistance, due to the fact of the lack of schoolbooks in Indonesian language.

=== 1952–1967 ===
In 1952, Canisius opened junior and senior high divisions. For 15 years (1952–1967), 90%-100% of students passed the national final examination. In 1967, the curriculum was changed and divided into three areas of study: culture-literature, social economics, and science. In 1974, the college implemented a point credit system.

== Notable alumni ==
- Muhammad Chatib Basri, former Minister of Finance
- Fauzi Bowo, Governor of Jakarta (2007–2012), Deputy governor of Jakarta (2002–2007)
- Arief Budiman, sociologist
- Soe Hok Gie, activist and political analyst
- Ginandjar Kartasasmita, former Minister of Finance
- Ananda Sukarlan, first Indonesian pianist carried in International Who's Who in Music
- Sehat Sutardja, co-founder of Marvell Technology Group, one of the richest men in the United States in 2007 per Forbes
- Akbar Tandjung, former speaker of the House of Representatives
- Jusuf Wanandi, Chinese-Indonesian politician and educator
- Sofjan Wanandi, businessman, chief of Gemala Group
- Rachmat Witoelar, former Minister of Ecology and Environment Welfare
- Ade Rai, Indonesian bodybuilder

== Gallery ==
Logo of Canisius College (1990–1991)

Logo of Canisius College (1927–1977)

== See also ==
- Catholic Church in Indonesia
- Education in Indonesia
- Kolese Gonzaga
- Kolese Loyola
- List of Jesuit schools
- List of schools in Indonesia
