= SMA Negeri 10 Padang =

Coordinates: 0.9363°S 100.36395°E

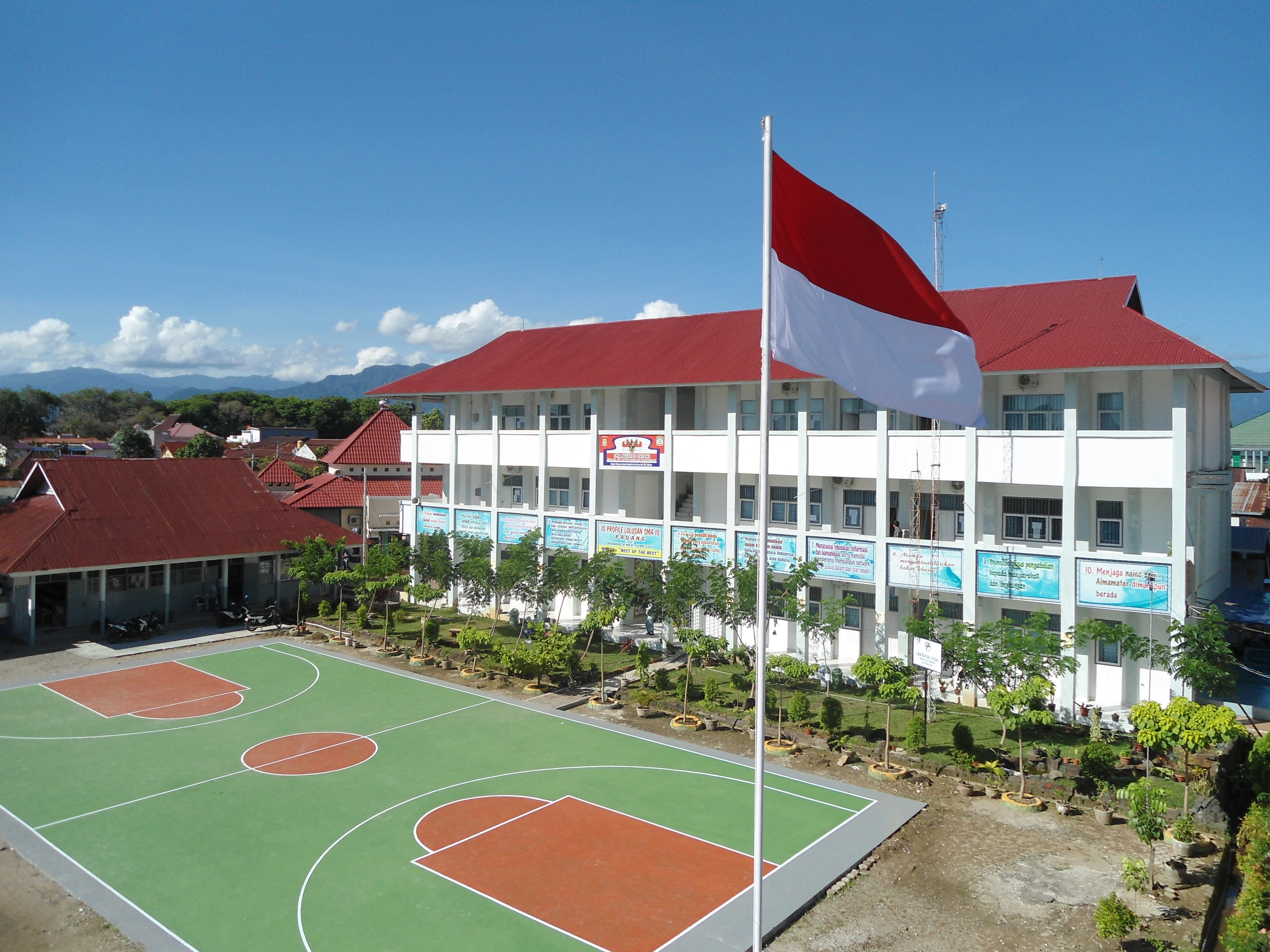

Location
- Situjuh Street; Jati, East Padang; Padang, West Sumatra; Indonesia

Information
- Type: Public school
- Established: 1958
- Headmaster: Drs. Parendangan, M.Pd.
- Grades: 10-12
- Website: www.sma10pdg.sch.id

Public Senior High School 10 Padang (Indonesian: SMA Negeri 10 Padang), also known as SMANTEN, is one of many public senior high school in Padang, West Sumatra, Indonesia. It is an unnumbered building that is located at Situjuh Street, several meters to the east of Sudirman Street, Padang. Together with SMA Negeri 1 Padang and SMA Negeri 3 Padang, this school had once been proclaimed as an international school.

Similar to all high schools in Indonesia, the school education in SMA Negeri 10 Padang consists of three years, ranging from 10th Grade to 12th Grade. Facilities include fully airconditioned classrooms, computer lab, library, mosque, and canteen. The school building was severely damaged after earthquakes in 2009.

== History ==
SMA Negeri 10 Padang was established in 1958 as a Sekolah Guru Bantu. In the following year, it was changed Sekolah Guru Atas. Since 1960, the school was renamed as Sekolah Pendidikan Guru. Later, in 1988, the name of the school became SMA Negeri 10 Padang.

In 2006, it was appointed to become RSBI (Rintisan Sekolah Bertaraf Internasional). In the national level, SMA Negeri 10 Padang has gained A+ accreditation from Indonesian Ministry of Education.

== Curriculum ==
The school curriculum adheres to the standard Indonesian high school curriculum and Cambridge International Curriculum. The duration of study is three years. In the second year, students are streamed into science and social studies programs.

== See also ==
- List of schools in Indonesia
