= Kolese Gonzaga =

School in South Jakarta, Indonesia

Gonzaga College High School Jakarta
- SMA Kolese Gonzaga Jakarta
- "4CHI" - Competence, Conscience, Compassion, Commitment, Humility, and Integrity

Location
- Jl. Pejaten Barat 10A; Jakarta Selatan, 12550; Indonesia
- 6°16′39″S 106°49′21″E

Information
- Former name: Canisius College, Southern Unit (1987-1990)
- Type: Private, Catholic, coeducational secondary education institution
- Motto: Latin: Ad Maiorem Dei Gloriam; English: For the Greater Glory of God
- Religious affiliation: Roman Catholic (Jesuits)
- Established: 3 November 1988; 37 years ago
- Rector: Adrianus Andy Gunardi
- Principal: Eduard Calistus Ratu Dopo
- Alma Mater song: Mars Kolese Gonzaga
- Website: www.gonzaga.sch.id

Sekolah Menengah Atas (SMA) Kolese Gonzaga is a private Catholic secondary school, located in Pejaten Barat, Jakarta, Indonesia. Established by the Indonesian Province of the Society of Jesus in 1987, the school began as a boys' school and commenced accepting girls in 1990. It was originally named as Kolese Kanisius Unit Selatan (English: Canisius College, Southern Unit) and got its current name in 1990. Its nicknames are Gonz and GC (Gonzaga College).

Kolese Gonzaga is known for allowing male students to grow long hair, provided they maintain a certain academic standard.

== History ==
The school was built alongside Wacana Bhakti Seminary in Pejaten Barat, South Jakarta, on land owned by the Roman Catholic Archdiocese of Jakarta. Built in 1986–1987, it opened on 3 November 1988. Initially, the school only accepted male students, but later in 1990 it accepted female students.

== Administration ==
The school is led by a Rector, who oversees the Principal. The Principal has three Vice Principals, one each for Curricular Affairs, General Affairs, and Student Affairs (the last more commonly called "moderator" within the school community). The Rectors, Principals, and Moderators traditionally are ordained Jesuit priests.

== In popular culture ==
Kolese Gonzaga served as one of the shooting locations for the Indonesian film Ada Apa dengan Cinta?.

== Notable alumni ==
- Rudi Soedjarwo, Indonesian movie producer
- Pandji Pragiwaksono, Indonesian stand-up comedian
- Renatta Moeloek, Indonesian celebrity chef
- Oscar Lolang, Indonesian musician
- Jason Ranti, Indonesian musician
- Abigail Manurung, Indonesian viral internet personality

== See also ==
- Jakarta Canisius College
- Kolese Loyola
- List of Jesuit schools
- List of schools in Indonesia
