= SMA Trimurti =

SMA Trimurti Surabaya
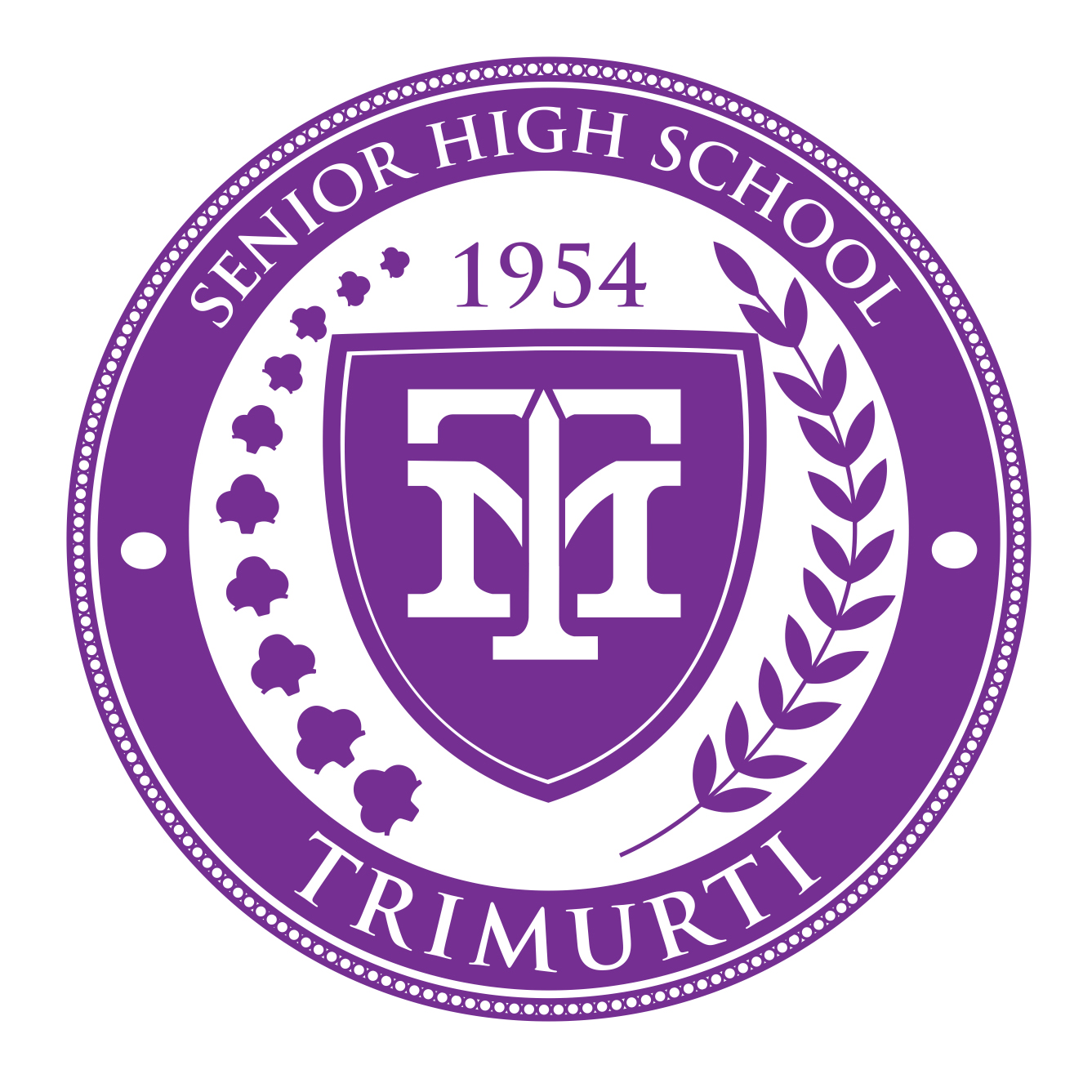
- Jalan Gubernur Suryo No. 3, Genteng, Surabaya, Jawa Timur, Indonesia.

Information
- Type: Private school
- Motto: Trimurti Jaya
- Established: 8 August 1954
- Principal: Syarif Andri Setiawan, S.Kom.
- Grades: X IPA, X IPS, XI IPA, XI IPS, XII IPA, XII IPS
- Average class size: 40 students
- Accreditation: A
- Website: smatrimurti.sch.id

SMA Trimurti is a school in the city of Surabaya, Jawa Timur, Indonesia, founded August 8, 1954.

== See also ==
- List of schools in Indonesia
- List of universities in Indonesia
