= Juan Laurent =

Indonesian basketball player

Juan Kokodiputra
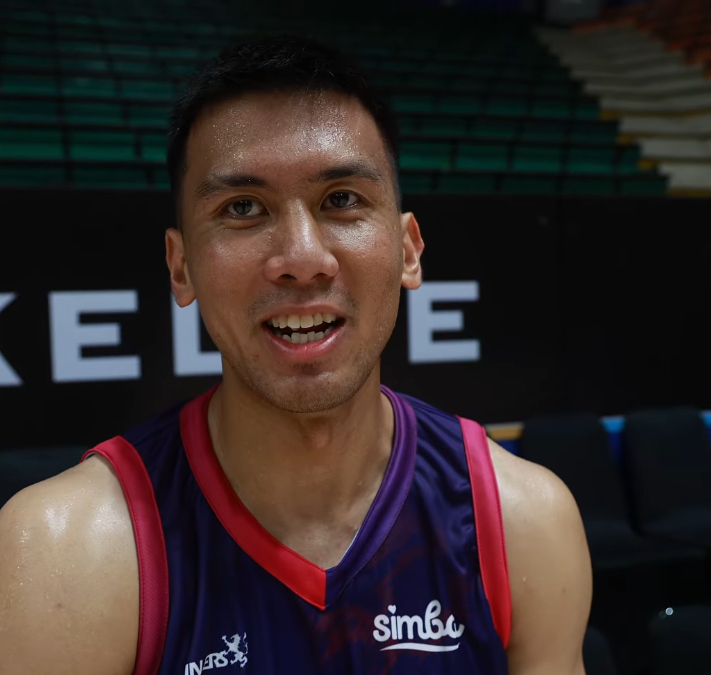
- Kokodiputra with RANS Simba Bogor in 2026

No. 0 – RANS Simba Bogor
- Position: Power forward / small forward
- League: IBL

Personal information
- Born: 15 July 1995 (age 31) Bandung, Indonesia
- Listed height: 193 cm (6 ft 4 in)
- Listed weight: 84 kg (185 lb)

Career information
- High school: Trinitas (Bandung, Indonesia)
- College: UPH
- Playing career: 2016–present

Career history
- 2016-2026: Satria Muda Pertamina
- 2026-present: RANS Simba Bogor

Career highlights
- 3× IBL champion (2018, 2021, 2022); IBL All-Star (2023); 4× All-IBL Indonesian Second Team (2021, 2023-2025); All-IBL Indonesian Third Team (2020); IBL Rookie of the Year (2017); LIMA champion (2015)
Medals
Men's basketball
Representing Indonesia
Southeast Asian Games
Gold medal – first place	2021 Vietnam	Team
SEABA Under-18 Championship
Silver medal – second place	2012 Singapore	Team

Juan Laurent Kokodiputra (born July 15, 1995) is an Indonesian professional basketball player for the RANS Simba Bogor of the Indonesian Basketball League (IBL). Kokodiputra mainly plays the power forward position, but can also play shooting guard. He played college basketball for the UPH Eagles.

== High school career ==
In Trinitas, Kokodiputra was selected as a DBL All-Star in 2011 and 2012.

== College career ==
He was gifted a basketball scholarship by Pelita Harapan University to play for the UPH Eagles of the Liga Mahasiswa, where in 2015 he won the championship.

== National team career ==
Kokodiputra was included in Indonesia's squad for the 2023 FIBA Basketball World Cup qualification.
