= Parepare =

City in South Sulawesi, Indonesia

- City
- City of Parepare; Kota Parepare

Other transcription(s)
  - Buginese: ᨄᨑᨙᨄᨑᨙ
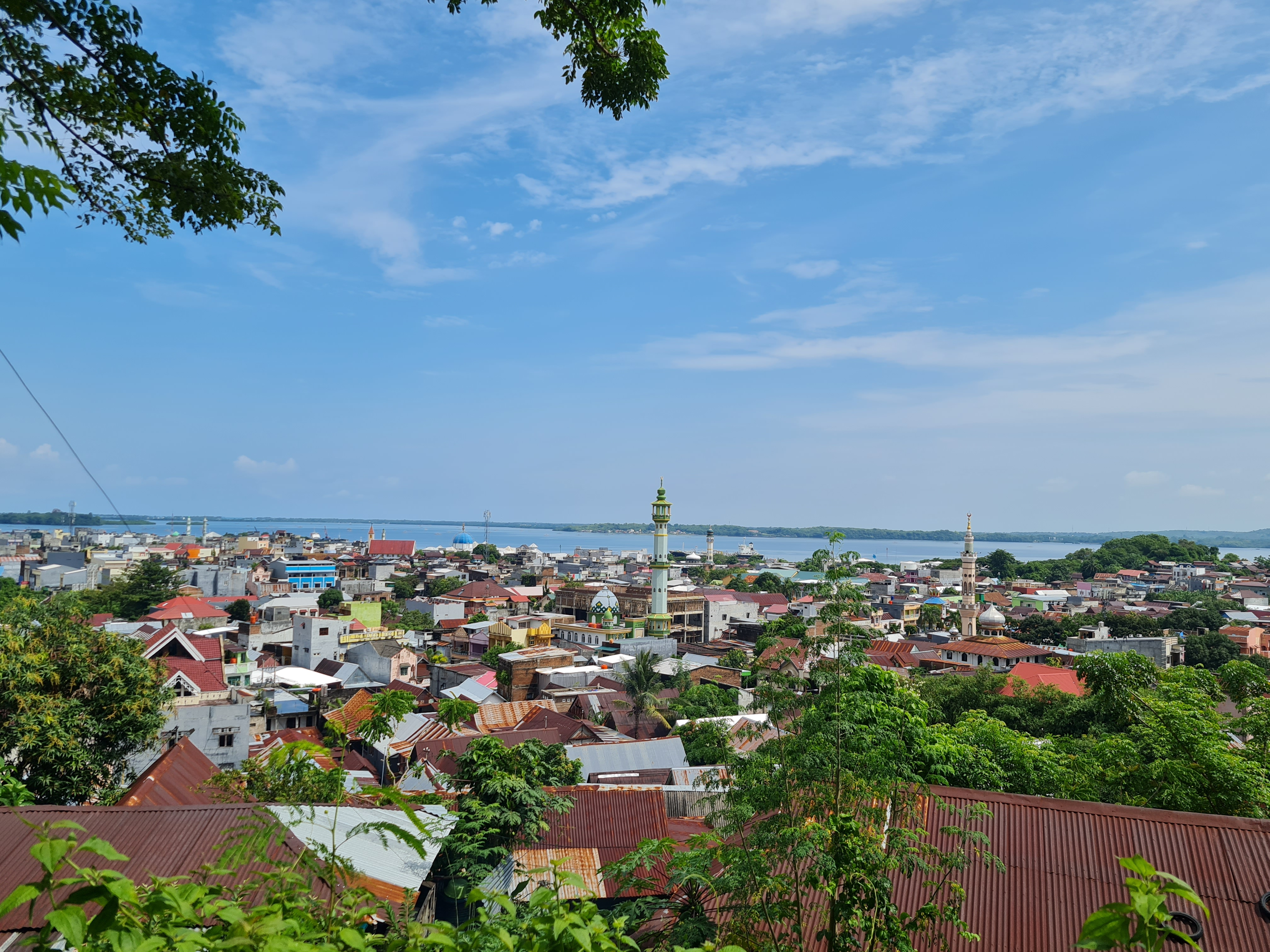
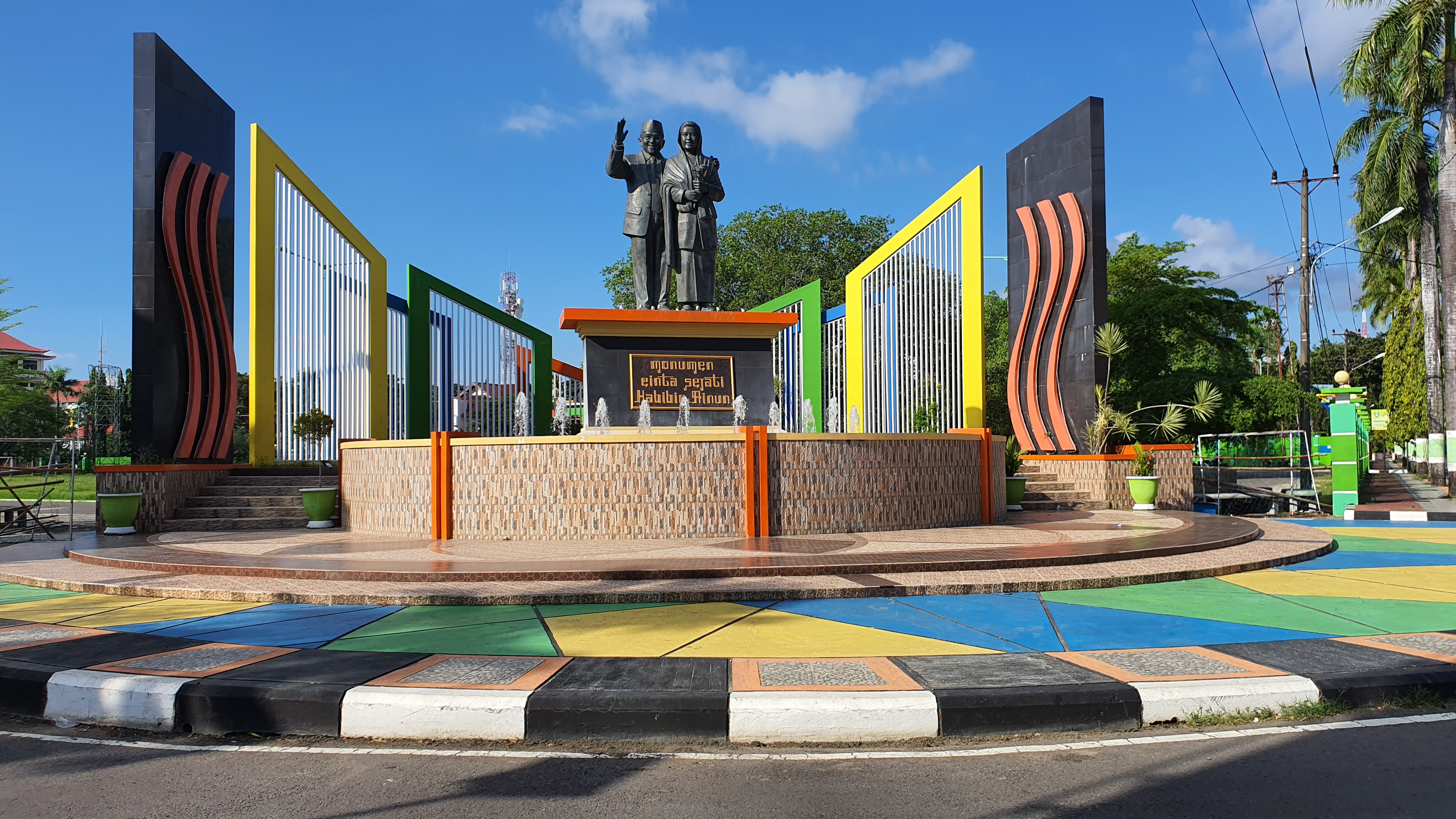
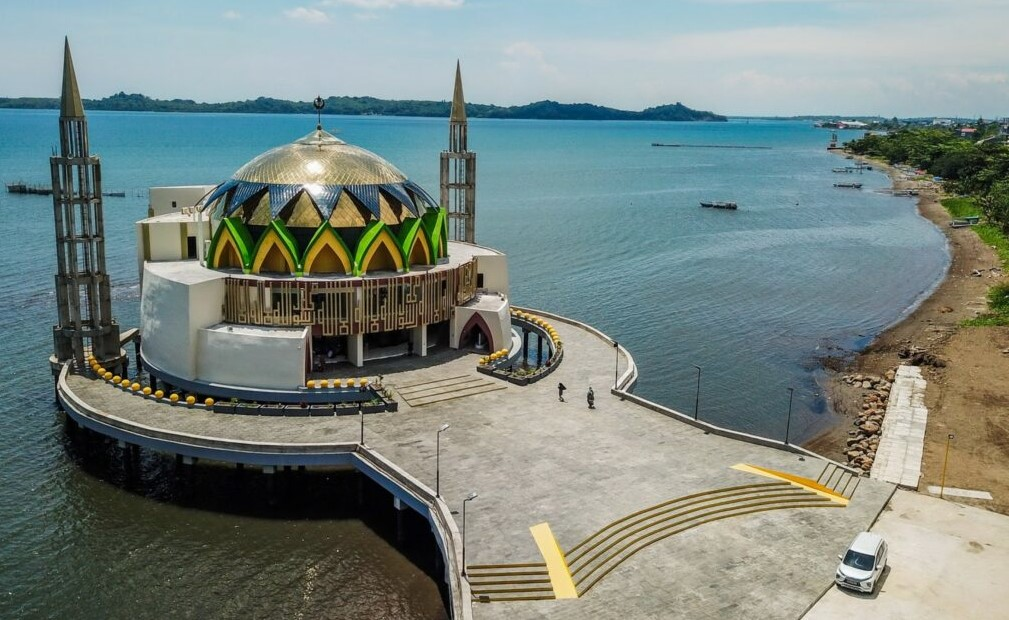
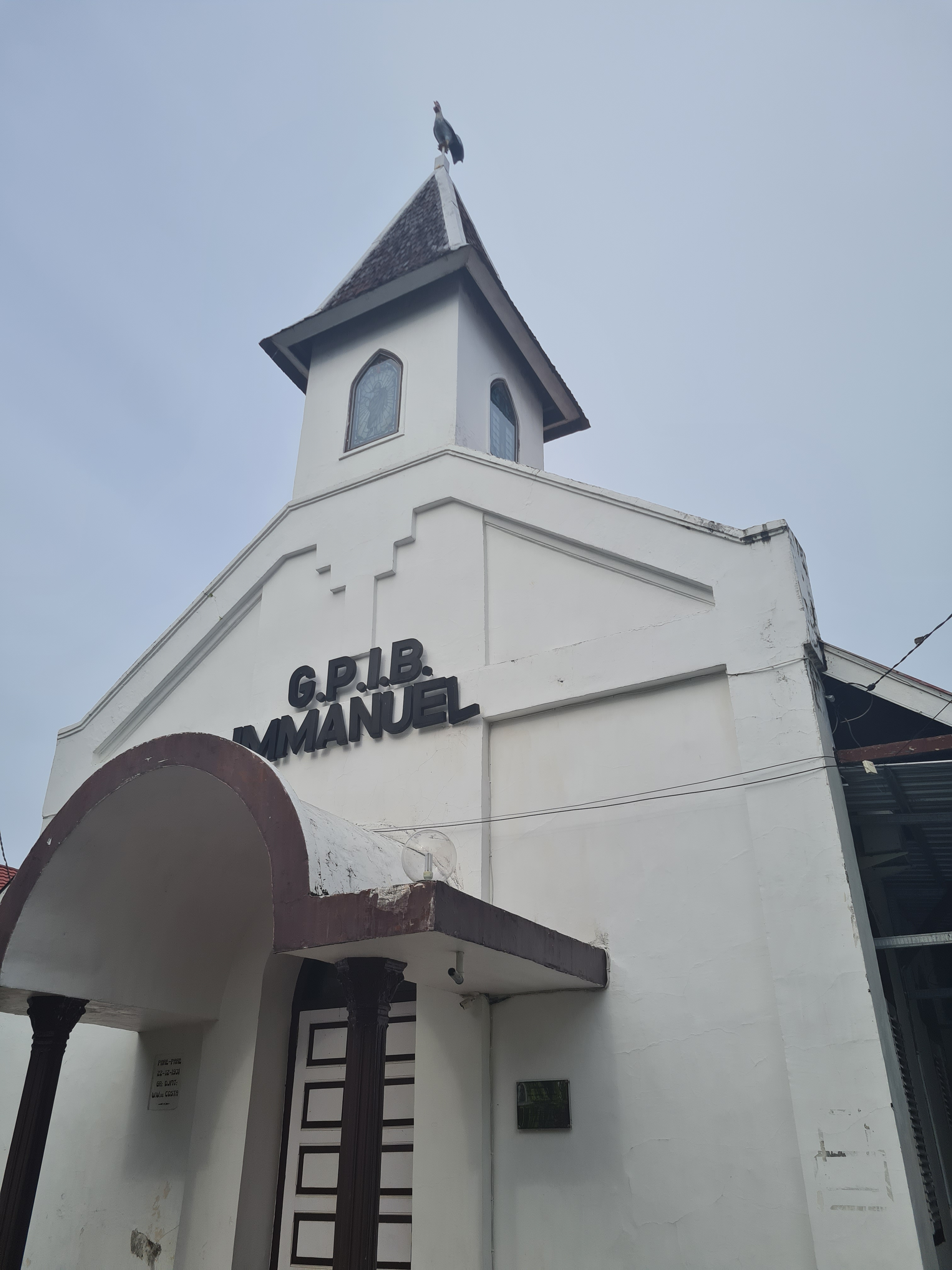
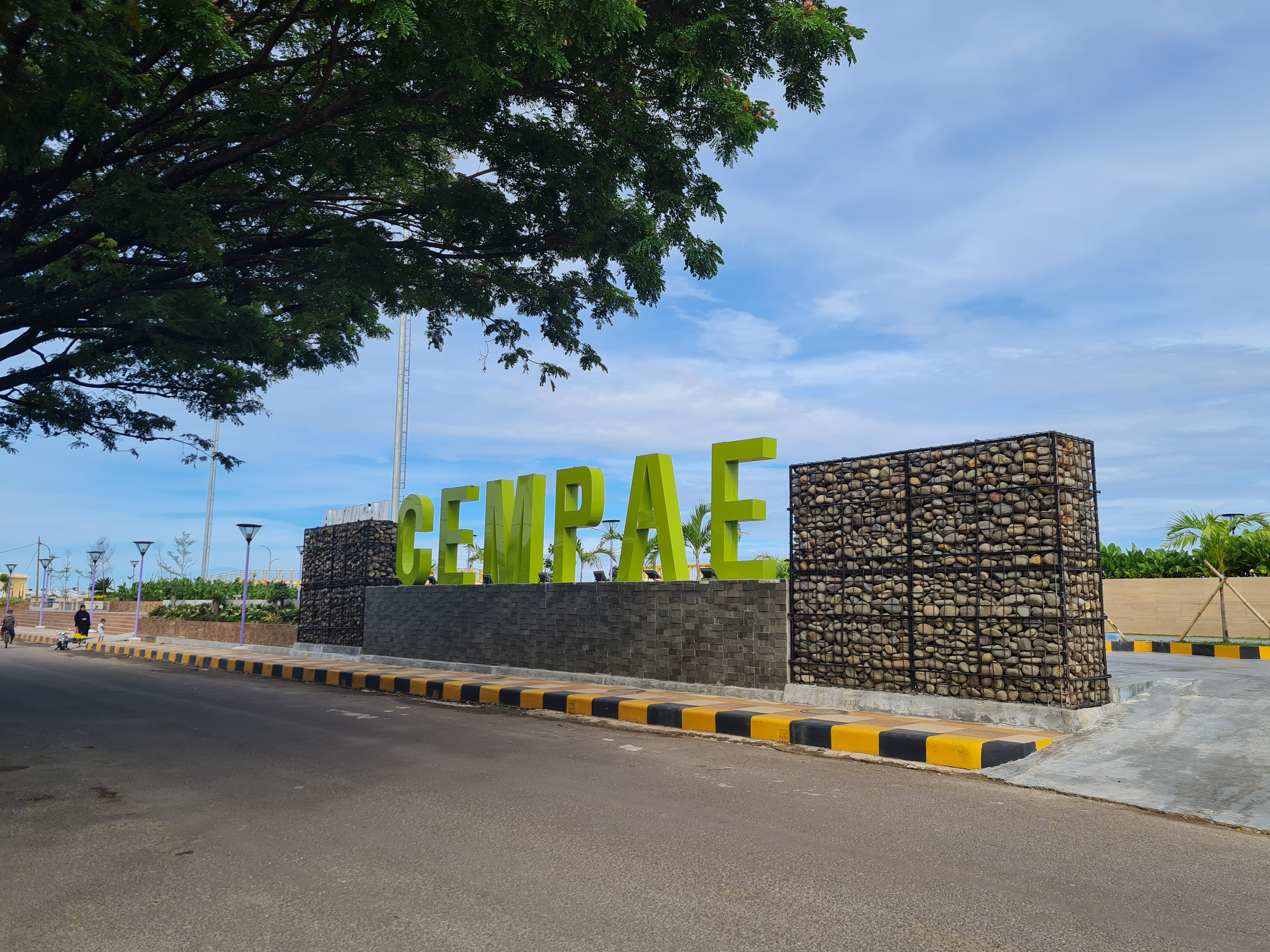
- View of Parepare Habibie Ainun Monument B. J. Habibie floating Mosque GPIB Immanuel Anjungan Cempae

- Coat of arms
- Nickname: Kota Cinta - City of Love
- Location within South Sulawesi
- Interactive map of Parepare
- Location in Sulawesi and Indonesia Parepare (Indonesia)
- Coordinates: 4°01′00″S 119°37′25″E
- Country: Indonesia
- Province: South Sulawesi
- Incorporated (city): 4 July 1959

Government
  - Mayor: Tasming Hamid
  - Vice Mayor: Hermanto Pasennang
  - Leader of People's Representative Council: Kaharuddin Kadir

Area
  - Total: 38.35 sq mi (99.33 km^{2})

Population (mid 2025 estimate)
  - Total: 165,137
  - Density: 4,306/sq mi (1,663/km^{2})
- Time zone: UTC+8 (Indonesia Central Time)
- Postal code: 91100
- Area code: (+62) 421
- Website: pareparekota.go.id

Parepare (Buginese pronunciation: [parɛ(ʔ)parɛ(ʔ)]; Indonesian pronunciation: [parepare(ʔ)] or [parɛparɛ(ʔ)]) is a city in the Indonesian province of South Sulawesi, located on the southwest coast of Sulawesi, about 155 km (96 mi) north of the provincial capital of Makassar. A port town, it is one of the major population centers of the Bugis people. The city had a population of 129,542 people at the 2010 census and 151,454 at the 2020 census; its official estimate as of mid-2025 was 165,137 (comprising 82,179 males and 82,958 females). It is the birthplace of B. J. Habibie, the third president of Indonesia.

== Geography ==
Parepare lies along the east side of Parepare Bay, a large natural harbour on the west coast of the southern peninsula of Sulawesi. The north and west sides of the harbour are contained within the Suppa District of Pinrang Regency; the west side is a long peninsula protecting Parepare from the sea. The harbour contains several small islands, the largest of which is Pulau Kamerang and the others include Pulau Zhimaru and Pulau Daoim.

Three principal roads leave Parepare heading north towards Pinrang, east towards Sidenreng and south towards Palanro and continuing down the coast towards Makassar.

== History ==
In the early development of this plateau, there was just a thicket of bushes that had many holes on slightly sloping land, which grew wild irregularly, ranging from the northern (Cappa Edge) up to the route south from the city. As time goes by, those bushes have now become the city of Parepare.

At an early date, there were kingdoms located on Parepare - the kingdom of Suppa in the 14th century and the Bacukiki Kingdom in the 15th century.

The term "Parepare" originates from a sentence attributed to the King of Gowa, "Bajiki Ni Pare", which means "(Ports in this region) are good." Since then, the name "Parepare" has referred to the port city. Parepare was subsequently visited by Malay people who came to trade in the region of Suppa.

Seeing the strategic position of a harbour protected by a headland on the front side, the Dutch conquered this place at the first opportunity and made it an important city in the territory of the central part of South Sulawesi.

At the time of the Dutch East Indies, in Parepare, there was a Resident Assistant and a Controleur or Gezag Hebber as Head of Government (the Dutch East Indies), while the status of the region is named the "Afdeling Parepare" which included five "Onder Afdeling" for Barru, Sidenreng Rappang, Enrekang, Pinrang and Parepare.

In each region, an Onder Afdeling Controlur was domiciled or a Gezag Hebber. Besides the Dutch East Indies government officials, the structure of the Dutch East Indies Government was also assisted by government officials and Bugis kings, namely Arung Barru in Barru, Addatuang Sidenreng in Sidenreng Rappang, Sporting Enrekang in Enrekang, Addatung Sawitto in Pinrang, while at Parepare there was Arung Mallusetasi.

This governance structure, up to the outbreak of World War II, was when the Dutch East Indies Government was overtaken around the year 1942.

== Administration ==
Parepare (city) is divided into four Districts (Kecamatan), tabulated below with their areas and their populations at the 2010 Census and the 2020 Census, together with the official estimates as at mid 2025. The table also includes the location of the district administrative centres and the number of administrative villages (all classed as urban kelurahan) in each district. Bacukiki District is inland and less densely populated, while the other three districts lie along the coast and contain the urban parts of the city. Soreang District is the densely-populated city centre, while Ujung District surrounds it to the east and south (Suppa District of Pinrang Regency borders Soreang on its north side). Bacukiki Barat is further south along the coast.

Kode Wilayah	Name of District (kecamatan)	Area in km^{2}	Pop'n Census 2010	Pop'n Census 2020	Pop'n Estimate mid 2025	Admin centre	No. of kelurahan
73.72.01	Bacukiki	66.70	14,477	25,511	30,263	Galung Maloang	4
73.72.04	Bacukiki Barat (West Bacukiki)	13.00	39,085	45,197	48,471	Sumpang Minangae	6
73.72.02	Ujung	11.30	32,231	33,843	37,295	Labukkang	5
73.72.03	Soreang	8.33	43,469	46,903	49,108	Bukit Harapan	7
	Totals	99.33	129,542	151,454	165,137	Bukit Harapan	22

== Climate ==
Parepare has a tropical monsoon climate (Am) with moderate rainfall from June to October and heavy rainfall from November to May.

Climate data for Parepare
Month	Jan	Feb	Mar	Apr	May	Jun	Jul	Aug	Sep	Oct	Nov	Dec	Year
Mean daily maximum °C (°F)	30.0 (86.0)	30.1 (86.2)	30.5 (86.9)	30.9 (87.6)	31.2 (88.2)	30.8 (87.4)	30.6 (87.1)	31.4 (88.5)	31.7 (89.1)	32.3 (90.1)	31.3 (88.3)	30.3 (86.5)	30.9 (87.7)
Daily mean °C (°F)	26.6 (79.9)	26.7 (80.1)	26.8 (80.2)	27.0 (80.6)	27.3 (81.1)	26.7 (80.1)	26.1 (79.0)	26.5 (79.7)	26.7 (80.1)	27.5 (81.5)	27.2 (81.0)	26.8 (80.2)	26.8 (80.3)
Mean daily minimum °C (°F)	23.2 (73.8)	23.4 (74.1)	23.2 (73.8)	23.2 (73.8)	23.4 (74.1)	22.6 (72.7)	21.6 (70.9)	21.6 (70.9)	21.8 (71.2)	22.7 (72.9)	23.2 (73.8)	23.3 (73.9)	22.8 (73.0)
Average rainfall mm (inches)	310 (12.2)	236 (9.3)	217 (8.5)	203 (8.0)	178 (7.0)	98 (3.9)	74 (2.9)	47 (1.9)	61 (2.4)	108 (4.3)	210 (8.3)	343 (13.5)	2,085 (82.2)
Source: Climate-Data.org

== List of mayors ==
This is a list of mayors of Parepare since 1960:

1. Andi Mannaungi (1960–1965)
2. Andi Mappangara (1965–1968)
3. Andi Mallarangeng (1969–1972)
4. Abdullah Adjaib (1972–1973)
5. Parawansa (1973–1977)
6. Joesoef Madjid (1977–1983)
7. Andi Samad Thahir (1983–1988)
8. Mirdin Kasim (1988–1993)
9. Syamsul Alam Bulu (1993–1998)
10. Basrah Hafid (1998–2003)
11. Zain Katoe (2003–2010)
12. Sjamsu Alam (2010–2013)
13. Taufan Pawe (2013–2023)
14. Tasming Hamid (2025–present)

== Twin town ==
- Tawau, Malaysia.

== See also ==
- List of reduplicated place names
- SMA Negeri 5 Parepare
