= The Global Center for College & Career Readiness =

International non-profit NGO

The Global Center for College & Career Readiness is an international non-profit NGO focused upon the development of sustainable community-focused capacity building for increased graduation rates and childhood skill development across grades P-20. Founded in the United States, the Center works around the world with consultants who directly interface with governments, school organizations, community development agencies and funders to focus efforts on classroom best practices and direct community support for school effectiveness. The Center is a project of the U.S.-based Curriculum Improvement Institute, founded by educators Michael Rush, Kevin Baird, Peg Portscheller and Jim Lehman.

== Approach ==
Recognizing that direct community support for schools is often misspent or focused on efforts which are temporary at worst and misguided at best, the Center brings together leading research as well as best-practice exemplars and lesson study to community and education leaders. Developing “Black Belt” practitioners who serve as community and school-based experts, the Center works to create sustainable capacity-building structures deep within school and community organizations.

The Global Center for College & Career Readiness and its parent organization, the Curriculum Improvement Institute, have worked closely with the American Council of Chief State School Officers and their Survey of Enacted Curriculum project, which represents one of the largest research-based initiatives exploring the implementation of outcomes-based education. The original Survey of Enacted Curriculum research was funded by the National Science Foundation and several American school districts and state Departments of the Education continue to participate in the project.

In June 2010, with the American publication of the Common Core State Standards by the Council of Chief State School Officers and the National Governors Association, the Center for College & Career Readiness turned its attention to the development of an international Pathway for Implementation of College & Career Benchmarks, based in part on its collaboration as a co-author of the National Implementation Pathway for Common Core State Standards. That works is based in part upon the research of the Surveys of Enacted Curriculum and the combined works of Dr. Andrew Porter, Dr. Rolf Blank, and the University of Wisconsin Center for Education Research.

== Structure ==
The Curriculum Improvement Institute is the project lead and home of the Global Center for College & Career Readiness, focused upon the development of College & Workplace ready students in grades P-20 around the world. Chairman of the Board of Directors, Kevin Baird, actively engages with governments, school organizations, community leaders and both private and public funders to focus efforts on instructional and community development practices to support improved graduation rates for more highly skilled young people.

The Global Center for College & Career Readiness actively partners with other organizations, public and private, to create pragmatic, sustainable practices supporting the implementation of educational best practices worldwide. They are co-authors of the National Implementation Pathway for Common Core State Standards, a variety of materials for the classroom focused upon the Common Core State Standards, and are co-producers of the National Conference on Common Core State Standards. They also sponsor International Conferences on College & Career Readiness and Community Development.

== International work ==
In 2011, the Global Center for College & Career Readiness partnered with international Soccer celebrity and philanthropist, David Bascome, to bring College & Career Ready development programs to Bermuda and across the Caribbean.

The Center’s interests extend to the modern economic crisis of countries such as Ireland, where education and economic development are viewed as critical elements to combat slowing growth and rising unemployment. The Center’s Chief Development Officer, Marian O'Leary, was born in County Cork and owns businesses in the country. Her family has been at the center of Irish economic development for decades, and her past work with Microsoft and Apple Computer have informed her approach to Community Development, building partnerships between private foundations, public school organizations, and business.

== Accreditation ==
The Center for College & Career Readiness supports Black Belt Certification programs in Common Core State Standards and College-Career Ready Development. Its programs have been accredited by Purdue University, where Dr. Jim Lehman has served as a faculty member and Dean and by the University of Southern California.
