= SMK Negeri 10 Bandung =

Location
- Jalan Cijawura Hilir No. 339; Bandung
- Coordinates: 6°57′52″S 107°39′28″E

Information
- Former names: Sekolah Menengah Karawitan Indonesia (SMKI) Negeri Bandung; Konservatori Karawitan (KOKAR) Bandung
- Type: Public
- Motto: "Seni Lestari, Negeri Berseri"
- Established: 1 October 1958; 67 years ago
- Principal: Asep Taryudin, S.Pd., M.Pd
- Grades: 10th grade to 12th grade; and 10th grade to 13th grade
- Enrollment: 2,186 Students
- Classes: 58
- Campus size: 50,000 sqm
- Accreditation: A
- Affiliation: Sekolah Standar Nasional; Rintisan Sekolah Bertaraf Internasional (2007–2013)
- Website: smkn10bandung.sch.id

SMK Negeri 10 Bandung (also known as SMKN 10 Bandung) is a public vocational high school for performing arts in West Java, Indonesia. The education period at SMK Negeri 10 Bandung is completed within three years and four years, starting from 10th grade to 12th grade and 10th grade to 13th grade.

== History ==
What was used as a reference for the establishment of KOKAR Bandung (en:Bandung Karawitan Conservatory) was on 1 October 1958, where for the first time the transfer of the Sundanese department from KOKAR Surakarta to Bandung was carried out. For five years (1958–1963) KOKAR Bandung was still a branch of KOKAR Surakarta. The idea of separating KOKAR Bandung from KOKAR Surakarta was put forward at the Cipayung Conference in 1962 and after the Inter-Working Meeting between KOKAR throughout Indonesia in Surakarta in 1963, officially KOKAR Bandung began to become independent.

When it was still a branch of KOKAR Surakarta, the curriculum used was as stipulated in the PPPK Ministerial Decree Number: 99883/S dated 21 December 1956 is an emphasis on deepening Sundanese Karawitan and Sundanese language.

From the beginning, KOKAR Bandung opened school activities starting from 14.00 to 18.00 WIB (UTC+7) with a place to move around because they are hitchhiking at schools or other institutions, such as SGB on H. Samsudin Street, SKKP on Kautamaan Istri Street, Bandung Regency Pavilion on Dalem Kaum Street and the West Java Cultural Area Inspection Office (Idakeb), next to the Yayasan Pusat Kebudayaan (en: Cultural Center Foundation) building on Naripan Street.

In 1961, KOKAR Bandung began to occupy its own building located on 212 Buahbatu Street, so that school activities start in the morning at 07.30 to 13.00 WIB. (UTC+7)

KOKAR's name changed to Sekolah Menengah Karawitan Indonesia (en: Indonesian Karawitan High School) or SMKI Bandung in accordance with the Decree of the Minister of PDK Number: 005/O/1974 and followed by changes to the curriculum stipulated by the Decree of the Minister of PDK Number: 0294/U/1976 dated 9 December 1976 and the length of education to 4 years.

On 8 June 1987 SMKI Bandung had to occupy a building that at that time was not completed located in Kampung Beberut Cijawura, Margacinta District, Bandung Regency, with requirements and full of risks having to open a new major or department, namely the Communication Graphic Design Department which was the forerunner of the establishment of SMSR Bandung (en: High School of Fine Arts) and is a filial school of SMKI Negeri Bandung and its construction is in the same complex with SMKI Negeri Bandung. The old building of SMKI Bandung, which is located at 212 Buahbatu Street, is used by ASTI Bandung (en: Indonesian Dance Academy).

In 1997, Margacinta Subdistrict became part of Bandung after the expansion of the area. and SMKI Bandung changed its name to SMK Negeri 10 Bandung, based on the Decree of the Minister of P&K No. 036/O/1997 dated 27 March 1997; with the education period returning again to 3 years.

In 2009, Margacinta Subdistrict changed to Buahbatu District after the expansion of the area. This year, SMK Negeri 10 Bandung is trusted as a school that has an ISO 9001:2008 Certificate.

Starting in 2018, the education period at SMK Negeri 10 Bandung was taken within three years and four years. SMK Negeri 10 Bandung this year also received assistance from the government through cooperation between The Ministry of Home Affairs and The Ministry of Education, Culture, Research and Technology in the Vocational High School Revitalization program.

In 2022, SMK Negeri 10 Bandung by The Ministry of Education, Culture, Research and Technology has been designated as a Center of Excellence Vocational High School (Indonesian: Sekolah Menengah Kejuruan Pusat Keunggulan).

== Institution names ==
- 1958: Konservatori Karawitan (KOKAR) Bandung
- 1976: Sekolah Menengah Karawitan Indonesia (SMKI) Negeri Bandung
- 1997: SMK Negeri 10 Bandung

== Principals ==
List of Directors/Principals of KOKAR/SMKI/SMK Negeri 10 Bandung :

Raden Machjar Angga Koesoemadinata	1958–1960
Daeng Soetigna	1960–1964
R. Tatang Sastrahadiprawira	1964–1965
R. H. Koko Koswara	1966–1972
Drs. H. Yaya Sukarya	1972–1996
Drs. Soepriadi	1996
Risman Suratman, S.Sn	1996–2001
Dra. Epi Sufiah., M.Si	2001–2003
Drs. H. Nanang Yusuf Nurdin., M.Si	2003–2007
Dra. Wiwi Siti Zawiyah	2008–2012
Drs. Ontahari	2012–2015
Dra. Yani Heryani., M.M.Pd	2015–2018
Bambang Satriadi, S.Sn., M.Sn	2018–2021
Drs. H. Slamet Heryadi., M.Pd	2021–2024
R. Dudi Rudiatna, S.Pd., S.ST., M.T.	2024–2025
Asep Taryudin, S.Pd., M.Pd	2025-present

== Programs and specialization ==
Performing arts programs include:

- Karawitan (Sundanese Karawitan)
- Dance (Sundanese Folk Dance)
- Theater
- Pop Music

Broadcasting and film programs include:

- Broadcast and Production of Television Programs
- Film Production
- Film Production and Production of Television Programs
