= SMA Negeri 3 Padang =

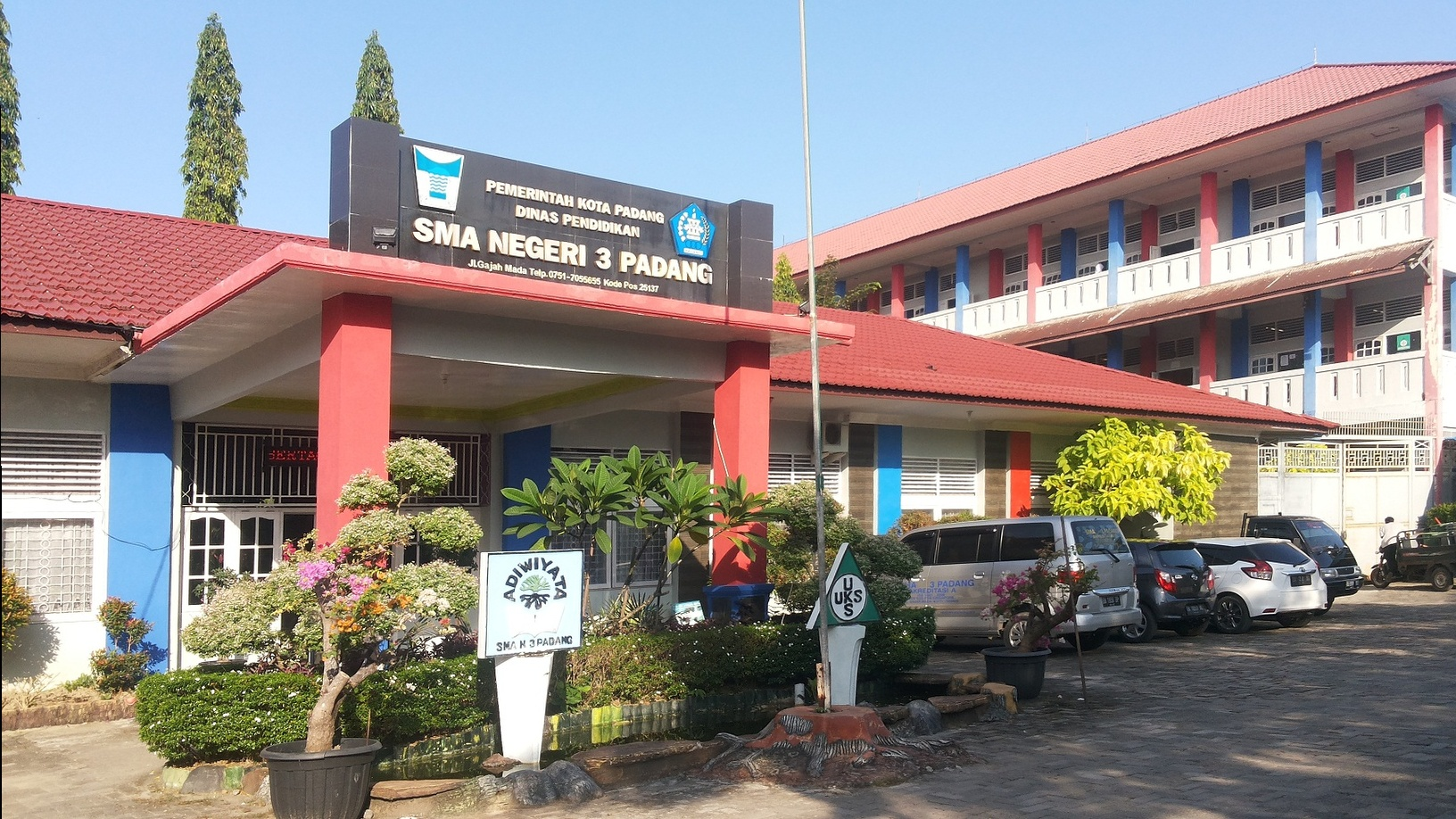
- SMA Negeri 3 Padang

Location
- Gajah Mada Street; Gunung Pangilun, North Padang; Padang, West Sumatra; Indonesia

Information
- Type: Public school
- Established: 1977
- Headmaster: Dra. Ifna Sukmi, M.Pd.
- Grades: 10-12
- Website: www.sman3padang.sch.id

Public Senior High School 3 Padang (Indonesian: SMA Negeri 3 Padang), also known as SMANTRI, is a public senior high school in Padang, West Sumatra, Indonesia. It is located at Gajah Mada Street, Gunung Pangilun, North Padang.

Similar to all high schools in Indonesia, the duration of study at SMA Negeri 3 Padang is three years, ranging from 10th Grade to 12th Grade. In the second year, students are streamed into science and social studies programs. The school curriculum adheres to the standard Indonesian high school curriculum and Cambridge International Curriculum.

Facilities include fully airconditioned classrooms, computer lab, library, mosque, and a canteen. The building was severely damaged after earthquakes in 2009.

== See also ==
- List of schools in Indonesia
