= Don Bosco Pondok Indah =

Sekolah Don Bosco Pondok Indah (also known as Sekolah Henricus Don Bosco Pondok Indah, Don Bosco or DBPI, affectionately called DB) is a private Christian school located in Pondok Indah, South Jakarta.

Don Bosco offers classes in Indonesian from Playgroup (pre-K) to Kelas 3 SMA (Grade 12) based on Kurikulum Berbasis Kompetensi/KBK (Competency Based Curriculum), and lessons of Mandarin and English.

== Campus ==
The campus is located in Jalan Duta Indah, Arteri TB Simatupang, Pondok Indah. It was previously located in what is now the new Pondok Indah Hospital building, built next to the old hospital.

== Facilities ==
Facilities include fully airconditioned classrooms, two computer labs, two libraries, a Physics lab, a Biology lab, a Chemistry lab, an English lab, two basketball courts, badminton courts, a main hall, two audiovisual classes, music room, and two canteens.

== Clubs and organizations ==
Don Bosco's OSIS (student committee) organise art festivals and the DB Cup every year to tighten the bonds between Don Bosco and other schools. Don Bosco is known for its basketball team and "Recycle" dance team.

Other clubs include:

Sports, Science, and Art: futsal (mini soccer), basketball, modern dance, ping pong (table tennis), and badminton. For TK (Kindergarten) and SD (Primary School), dance, ballet, and taekwondo are available.

Science: KIR (teen scientific work) and chess.

Art: theatre, photography, band, choir, school magazine, wall magazine, and visual art. For TK (Kindergarten), Angklung band is available, as for SD (Primary School), SMP (Junior High School), and SMA (High School), Kulintang band is available.

== Bullying Case ==
From July, 28th 2012 to September 30, 2012, Indonesian Police conducted an investigation in the school on the allegation of bullying by the senior students of the newly admitted students in Don Bosco Pondok Indah. The senior students allegedly beat their juniors and compelled them to drink beer and smoke cigarettes. Eight students already reported the bullying case to the Indonesian Police.

Peaceful and non-judicial means were used in resolving the case. Mediation by the school and other concerned parties such as the Children's Protective Service and police resulted in a truce agreement between complainants and defendants. It all ended in September 2012.
