= Wenhua Qiaoliang Trilingual National School =

Wenhua Qiaoliang Trilingual National School (文化桥梁三语国民学校 Wenhua Qiaoliang Sanyu Guomin Xuexiao, literally "Cultural Bridge Three-language National School") in Bali, Indonesia, is the first government-established Chinese-using school in Indonesia. It was founded with some 300 students in 1966. The three languages used are Chinese, Indonesian and English. The student body is mainly composed of overseas Chinese, ethnic Indonesians, and those of European descent.
