= Cita Hati Christian School =

Location
- Jl. Kejawen Putih Tambak No. 26-30; Surabaya, East Java, 60112; Indonesia; 7.2796°S 112.8082°E

Information
- School type: Private, National Plus
- Motto: Building a generation of Character, Faith and Wisdom
- Religious affiliation: Christianity
- Established: 1990
- Age: 1 to 17
- Affiliation: Association of National and Private Schools (ANPS)
- Website: www.bchati.sch.id

Cita Hati Christian School is a private Christian National Plus school in Indonesia that delivers preschool and K-12 education. Founded in 1990, the school has several campuses: the East and West Campuses in Surabaya and the Samarinda Campus in Samarinda. It is an accredited International Baccalaureate World School offering IB Diploma Programme since 2005, and a Cambridge International School offering Cambridge primary to upper secondary curriculum and certification since 2010.

== History ==
The Buah Hati Education Foundation established the first Buah Hati Christian Preschool and Kindergarten in 1990. In 1994, the first Cita Hati Elementary School was founded in Laguna Indah, Surabaya. In 2003, Cita Hati Christian Junior and Senior High School was founded in Manyar Kertoarjo, before relocating to Pakuwon City in 2005, next to the elementary school building. These locations are now known as the East Campus. In the same year, the Cita Hati Christian School East Campus was approved as the first International Baccalaureate Diploma Programme school in East Indonesia for grades 11-12.

In 2008, the Buah Hati Education Foundation established a preschool and elementary school in Citraland, Surabaya, forming the West Campus. In 2010, Cita Hati Christian School East Campus was certified by Cambridge Assessment International Education. In 2020, Weejoy by Buah Hati School was founded in the west as an early childhood education centre.

== Curriculum ==
Cita Hati Christian Elementary School utilizes the Cambridge Primary Curriculum in mathematics, science, and English for grades 1 through 6. Cambridge Lower Secondary Curriculum is provided by Cita Hati Christian Junior High School for grades 7 through 8, followed by Cambridge International General Certificate of Secondary Education (IGCSE) for grades 9 through 10 in Cita Hati Christian Senior High School. Moreover, International Baccalaureate Diploma Programme (IBDP) is offered for grades 11 through 12.

== Campuses ==
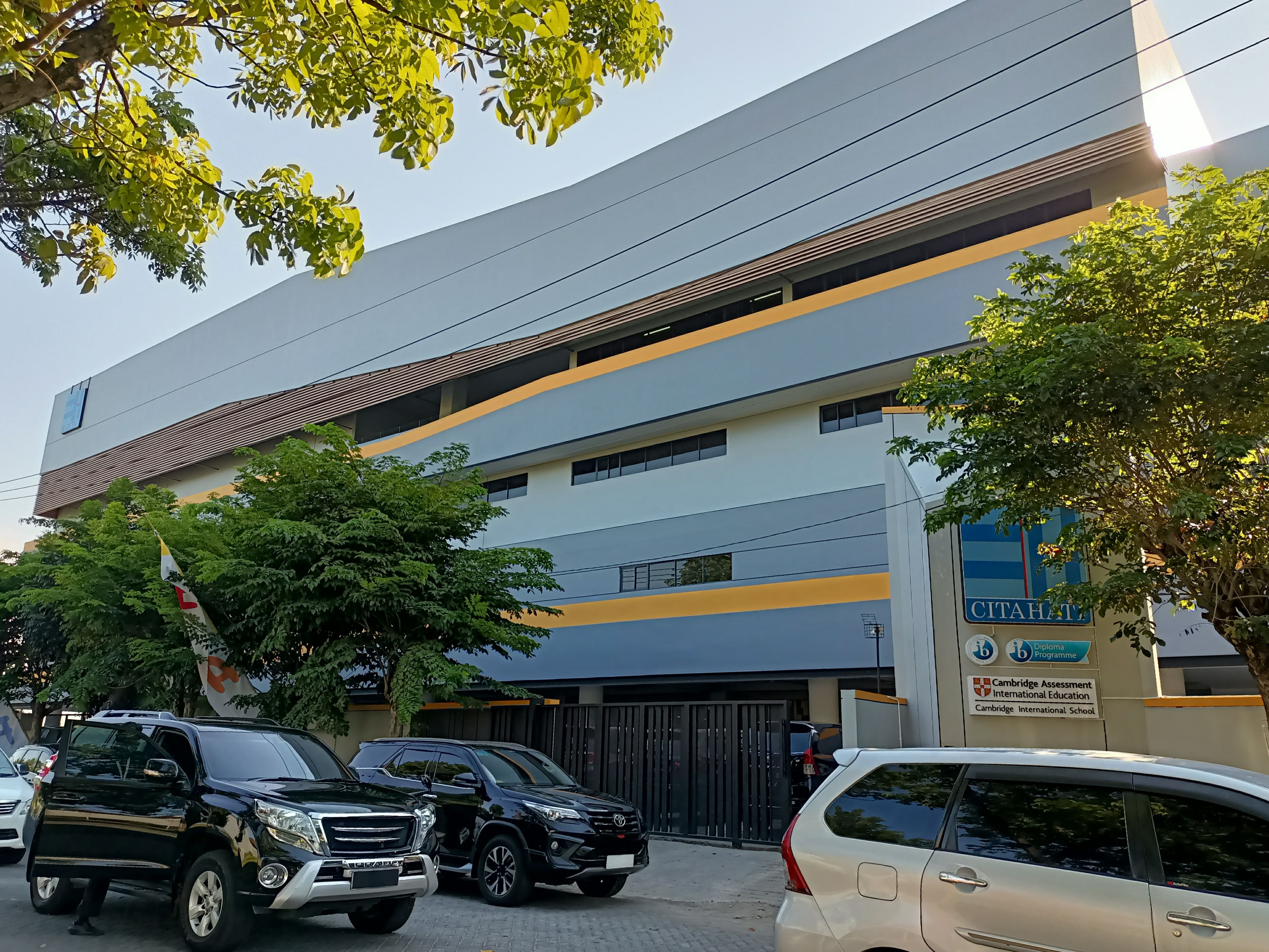
East Campus High School Building

Cita Hati Christian School has three campuses:

- Cita Hati West Campus, Surabaya
- Cita Hati East Campus, Surabaya
- Cita Hati Samarinda Campus, Samarinda
