= The Curriculum Improvement Institute =

Non-profitable 501 (c) 3 research and training organization

The Curriculum Improvement Institute is an American-based, non-profit, 501 (c) 3 research and training organization founded in 2008 by Michael Rush, Kevin Baird Peg Portscheller and Jim Lehman. The Institute primarily supports regional and national conferences and professional development focused upon the alignment of K-12 instruction to standards.

The Curriculum Improvement Institute has worked closely with the Council of Chief State School Officers and their Survey of Enacted Curriculum project, which represents one of the largest research-based initiatives exploring the implementation of standards-based education. The original Survey of Enacted Curriculum research was funded by the National Science Foundation and several school districts and state Departments of the Education continue to participate in the project.

In 2010, with the publication of the Common Core State Standards by the Council of Chief State School Officers and the National Governor’s Association, the Institute turned its attention to development of an implementation pathway for the new Common Core State Standards based in part upon the research of the Surveys of Enacted Curriculum and the combined works of Dr. Andrew Porter, Dr. Rolf Blank, and the University of Wisconsin Center for Education Research.

The Curriculum Improvement Institute is the project lead and home of the Global Center for College & Career Readiness, focused upon the development of College & Workplace ready students in grades P-20 around the world. Chairman of the Board of Directors, Kevin Baird, actively engages with governments, school organizations, community leaders and both private and public funders to focus efforts on instructional and community development practices to support improved graduation rates for more highly skilled young people.

The Curriculum Improvement Institute and the Global Center for College & Career Readiness actively partner with other organizations, public and private, to create pragmatic, sustainable practices supporting the implementation of educational best practices worldwide. They are co-authors of the National Implementation Pathway for Common Core State Standards, a variety of materials for the classroom focused upon the Common Core State Standards, and are producers of the National Conference on Common Core State Standards.

In 2010, the Global Center for College & Career Readiness partnered with international Soccer celebrity and philanthropist, David Bascome, to bring College & Career Ready development programs to Bermuda and across the Caribbean. The Curriculum Improvement Institute and the Center for College & Career Readiness support Black Belt Certification programs in Common Core State Standards and College-Career Ready Development. Its programs have been accredited by Purdue University, where Dr. Jim Lehman has served as a faculty member and Dean and by the University of Southern California.
