= Cendana Education Foundation =

Indonesian private school organization

Cendana Education Foundation Yayasan Pendidikan Cendana
- 2018 version of the logo
- Formation: 1958
- Type: Private school organization
- Purpose: Education
- Region served: Rumbai District, Minas District, Duri District, and Dumai District
- Members: 13 schools
- Parent organization: PT. Pertamina Hulu Rokan
- Website: ypc.or.id Alumni Forum

Cendana Education Foundation (Indonesian: Yayasan Pendidikan Cendana) is an education foundation founded by Caltex Pacific Indonesia (now Chevron Pacific Indonesia).

== History ==
Cendana Education Foundation (Cendana for short) was established in 1958 by some of Indonesian employees of PT. Caltex Pacific Indonesia in Rumbai District. They wanted their children go to a local school, where they teach in Indonesian. Before 1958, all Caltex-employees' (local native or expatriate) children went to the American School, although there were no gap between expatriate kids and natives. Some parents got their children to school at SMA 1 Pekanbaru, the only high school in town, which is many kilometers apart from the Caltex operational district. Then, the parents decided to lobby the company to establish a new Indonesian Curriculum-based school. At first it was named Caltex Public School (Sekolah Rakyat Caltex), referring to the company name. It was 100 percent controlled by the company.

At first, SRC was given the Rumbai Plaza which had three classrooms, side-by-side with the American School. For the teachers, Caltex recruited three certified schools teachers from Pekanbaru, Jakarta and Padang with a status of Caltex employees: K.C. Laibahas, A. Zamzami, and Djohan Widjaja. The public school acts in the same level of Elementary School, which has six grades. With only three classrooms, they had to divide each room into two sections, First-Second Grade, Third-Fourth Grade, and Fifth-Sixth Grade.

In the early 1960s, the school was run by a subsidiary foundation called The Caltex Employee's Children Education Foundation (Yayasan Pendidikan Anak Pegawai Caltex or YPAPC) which was led by H. Boerhanoeddin St. Batoetah. It ran the Elementary School and also the newly established Indrapura Junior High. In 1969, for restructurisation, the YPAPC and Caltex Parents Foundation (Yayasan Persatuan Orang Tua Murid Caltex or YPOMC) established a new foundation, led by Djohan Widjaja, where it will run all of Caltex's Schools. The name Cendana was given, derived from the Indonesian name for Sandalwood. The name Cendana was additionally considered due to not changing the already-popular abbreviations used by the community, such as YPOMC, SDC, and SMPC.

== Schools ==
Cendana Education Foundation consists of 13 Cendana schools, divided in four districts of ex-Chevron IndoAsia's operation.

There are:

=== Rumbai District ===
- TK (Kindergarten) Cendana Rumbai,
- SD (Elementary School) Cendana Rumbai,
- SMP (Junior High School) Cendana Rumbai,
- SMA (High School) Cendana Rumbai,
- SLB (Special school for disabled students) Cendana Rumbai.

=== Minas District ===
- TK (Kindergarten) Cendana Minas,
- SD (Elementary School) Cendana Minas,
- SMP (Junior High School) Cendana Minas. (Inactive, moved to Rumbai.)

=== Duri District ===
- TK (Kindergarten) Cendana Duri,
- SD (Elementary School) Cendana Duri,
- SMP (Junior High School) Cendana Duri,
- SMA (High School) Cendana Duri.
- SLB Cendana Duri.

=== Dumai District ===
- TK (Kindergarten) Cendana Dumai. (Inactive)
