= Wijaya Putra School =

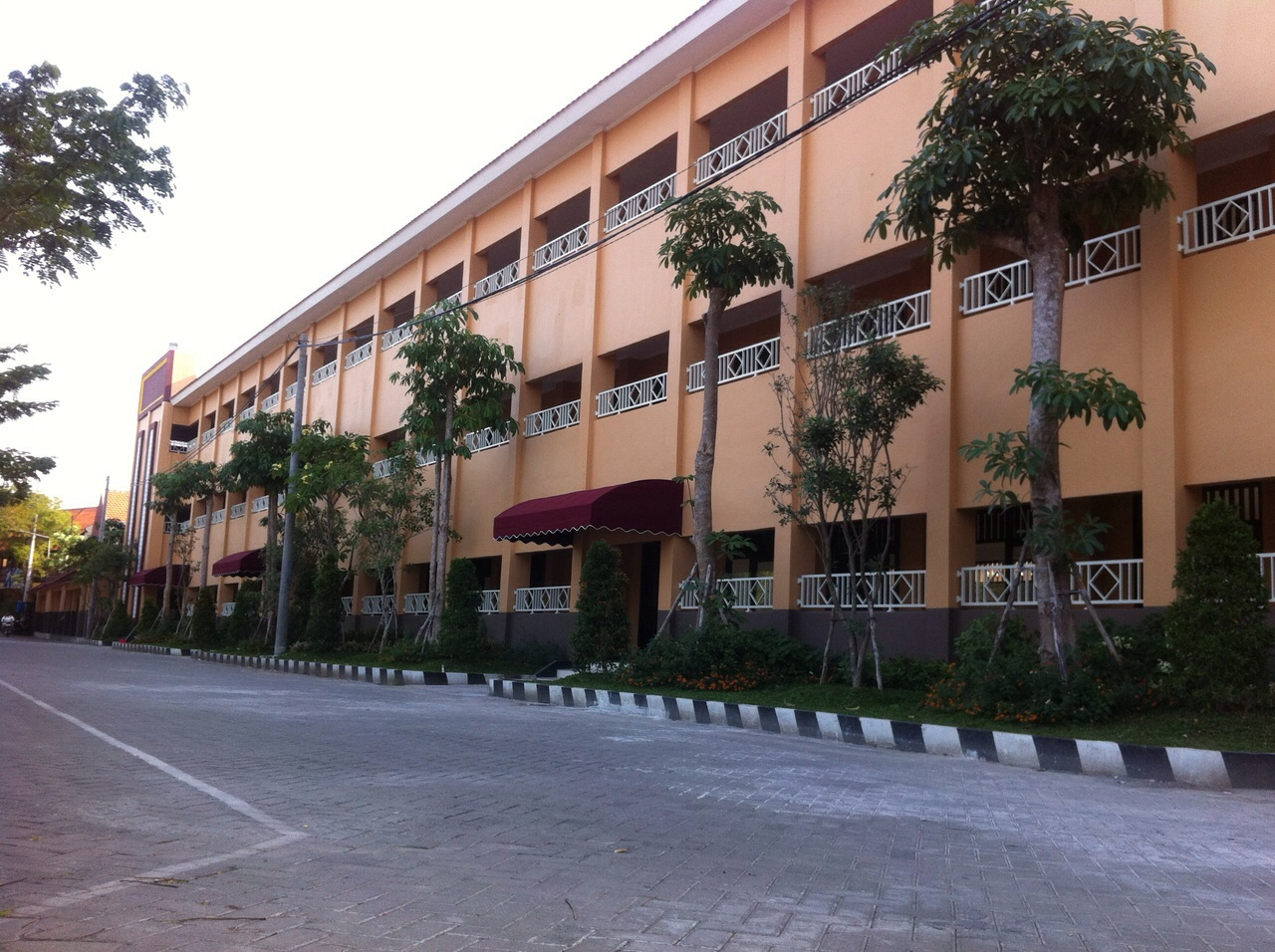
- Surabaya, East Java, Indonesia

Information
- School type: Private
- Motto: Unggul dan Berbasis Budi Pekerti
- Established: 1994
- Director: Budi Endarto, S.H., M.Hum.
- Campus: Raya Benowo 1-3, Surabaya
- Website: http://www.wijayaputra.sch.id

Wijaya Putra School (commonly known as Wijaya Putra or simply WP) is an independent school in Surabaya. This school consists of three schools, they are Junior High School, Senior High School, and Vocational High School. This school was established in 1994.

The high school is well-known for its cheerleading and research club which often participated and became winners of national competitions.

== Extracurricular ==
- Basketball
- Futsal
- English Conversation Club
- Pramuka
- Volleyball
- Jiu-Jitsu
- Modern Dance
- Choir
- Traditional Dance
- Cheerleader
- Research Club
