= Sekolah Dyatmika =

- ᬲᭂᬓᭀᬮᬄᬤ᭄ᬬᬢ᭄ᬫᬶᬓ
- Denpasar, Bali; Indonesia

Information
- Motto: Education for a better world
- Established: 1995
- Employees: 209
- Age range: 3-18 years
- Enrollment: 775 students
- Website: http://www.dyatmika.org

Sekolah Dyatmika or Dyatmika School is a bilingual (Indonesian/English) private school in Denpasar, Bali, Indonesia, serving students from early childhood through secondary school (Playgroup through Class 12).

== History and status ==
Sekolah Dyatmika was founded in 1995 by a group of parents.

It operates as a not-for-profit institution under the auspices of the Yayasan Dyatmika Sekar Bawana.

== Curriculum and accreditation ==
Dyatmika is accredited by Cambridge Assessment International Education (CAIE) and serves as a Cambridge International School and Examination Centre.

The school offers the Cambridge programme from Primary Prep up to Class 12.

As an Indonesian school, Dyatmika also incorporates the mandatory elements of the Indonesian National Curriculum as required by the Indonesian Ministry of Education and Culture.

Indonesian (or dual-nationality) students sit the national examinations in the required years (Classes 5, 8, 11).

From Class 9 onward, the school offers a “Double Award” option: students may graduate with both Indonesian national exam results and Cambridge qualifications (IGCSE / A-Level), giving them flexibility to pursue further education either in Indonesia or abroad.

== Language and educational approach ==
In Early Years and Primary levels, Dyatmika implements a dual-language programme: instruction is delivered in both Bahasa Indonesia and English.

At the secondary level (SMP and SMA), most subject instruction is conducted in English while Bahasa Indonesia remains a required language subject.

The school emphasizes inquiry-based learning, critical thinking, creativity, and development of well-rounded individuals, combining academic rigor with arts, sports and a sense of community responsibility.

== Campus, facilities, and student body ==
Dyatmika is located in Kesiman–Kertalangu, Denpasar (near Sanur, Bali).

The campus overlooks rice fields and the Indian Ocean, and includes purpose-built facilities: science laboratories, computer rooms, art studios, music rooms, libraries, covered sports courts, playing fields, and more.

Class sizes are reportedly limited (maximum 26 students), supporting a community-oriented, small-group teaching environment.

As of the 2024–2025 school year, the school serves 775 students representing 44 nationalities. The largest national groups are Indonesian (~45%), British (~11%), Australian (~8%), American (~5%), Dutch (~5%), and Japanese (~4%).

== Notability and role ==
Dyatmika is one of the better-known international/spk schools in Bali and is often cited among private schools offering Cambridge curriculum on the island.
