= Cisco Networking Academy =

Online education program

Cisco Networking Academy or NetAcad is an online global educational program product of American Cisco Systems. It started in California in 1997.
