= New Zealand School Jakarta =

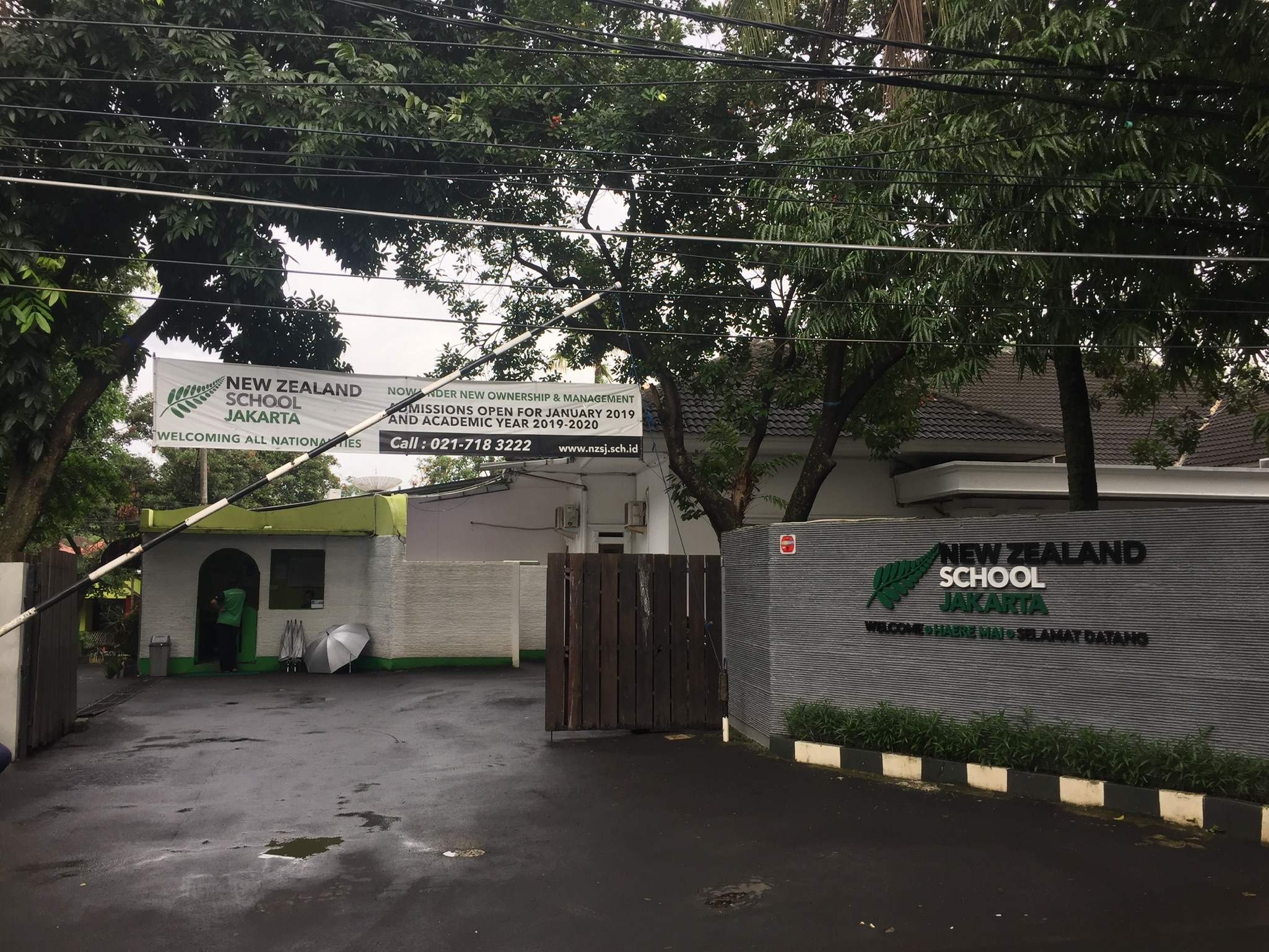

Location
- Jl. Kemang Selatan I #1A, Kemang, Jakarta Selatan, 12730 Indonesia; Jakarta; Indonesia
- Coordinates: 6.2645°S 106.8172°E

Information
- Established: 2002
- Website: www.nzsj.sch.id

The New Zealand School Jakarta (NZSJ), formerly New Zealand Independent School, is an international school located in Kemang, South Jakarta (Jakarta Selatan), Jakarta, Indonesia. It was established in 2002.

The school changed its name from New Zealand International School (NZIS) following the ruling by the Government of Indonesia in 2014 that all schools had to remove the word international from their name.

== See also ==
- Indonesia–New Zealand relations
