= SMA Negeri 5 Parepare =

Location
- Jalan Kelapa Gading No. 69 (Indonesia) Parepare, South Sulawesi 91123; Indonesia

Information
- Type: Public school
- Established: February 12, 2005
- Headmaster: Muzakkir Damir, S.Pd., M.Pd.
- Grades: 10-12
- Enrollment: 307
- Accreditation: A
- Website: http://www.sman5parepare.sch.id

SMA Negeri 5 Parepare or also known as Smaeli is one of the high schools in South Sulawesi, Indonesia. The school is implementing a system or boarding school Boarding School.

== Headmaster ==
1. Drs. Mohammad Nur Efendi (2005–2008)
2. Drs. Irman MR, M.Pd (2008–2009)
3. Drs. Ahmad Ismail (2009–2010)
4. Drs. H. Mas'ud Muhammad, M.Pd (2010–2015)
5. Drs. Muhammad Anshar Rahim (2015–2017)
6. Hamzah Wakkang, S.Pd, M.Pd (2017–2022)
7. Muzakkir Damir, S.Pd., M.Pd (2022–present)
