= Chandra Kumala School =

School in North Sumatra, Indonesia

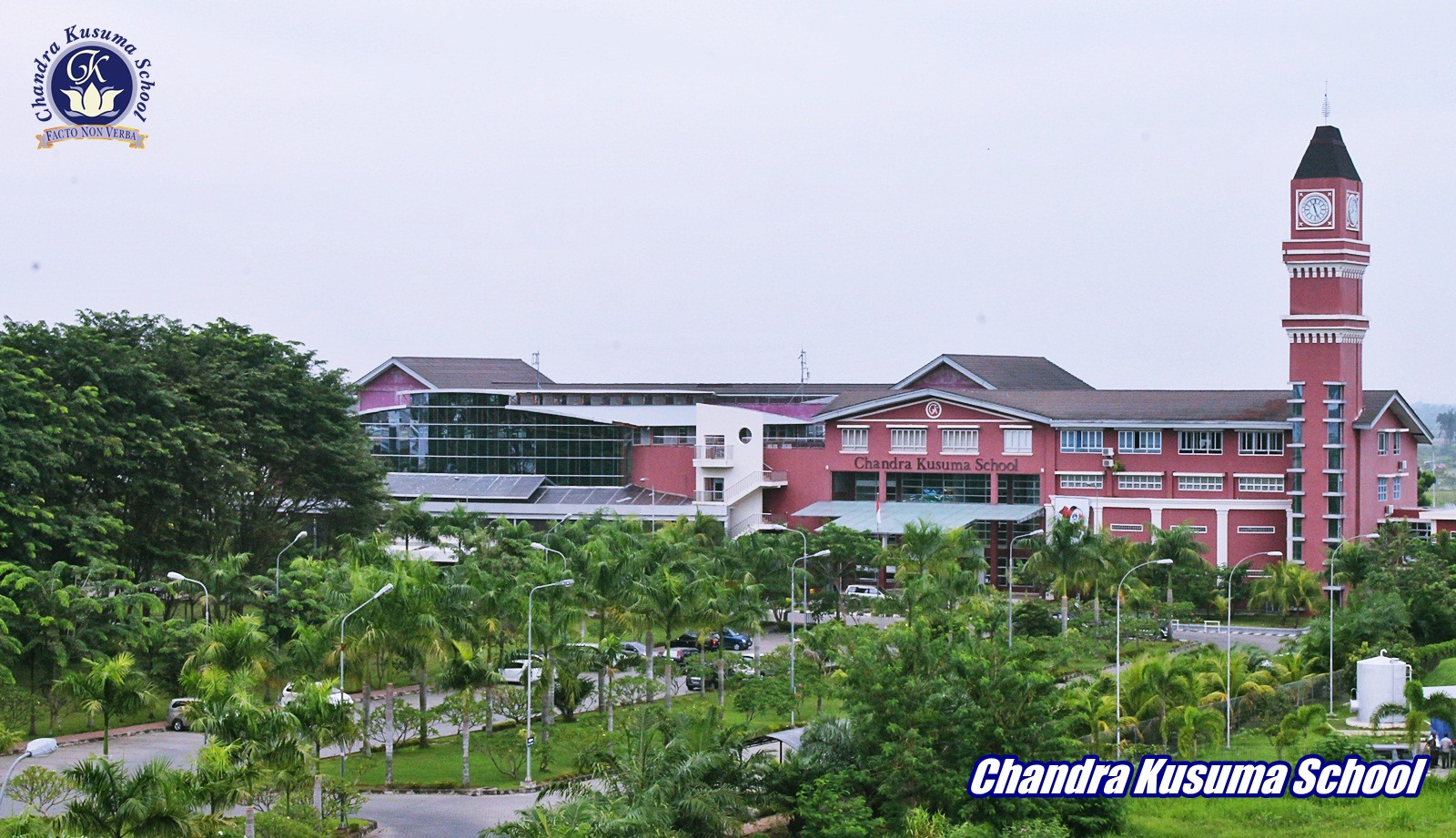
Chandra Kumala's main building, containing classes, sports hall, auditorium and admin block

Chandra Kumala School (formerly Chandra Kusuma School) is known as SPK school (Satuan Pendidikan Kerjasama). The international curriculum provided at this school is from Cambridge International Examinations (reference number ID124). The school is located in Deli Serdang, a regency of North Sumatra.

It is a registered Cambridge International Examination Centre and provides examinations for eligible private candidates. There is also a full and partial scholarship for both disadvantaged, and exceptional students.
