= MAN 3 Kediri =

MA Negeri 3 Kediri
- Jalan Letjend Soeprapto 58, Kota Kediri; Kediri, East Java; Indonesia

Information
- Type: Public
- Motto: "Past Steps Toward Achievement"
- Established: 1992
- Principal: Sja'roni, M.Pd.I
- Headmaster: Drs. H. Nursalim, M.Pd.I
- Color: Green
- Nickname: Mandiga
- Website: http://www.man3kediri.sch.id/

MAN 3 Kediri are secondary level schools located at Jalan Letjend Soeprapto No. 58, Kelurahan Banaran, Sub City, Kediri, East Java, Indonesia. Now MAN 3 Kediri is an international school, inaugurated in 2010.

== History ==
MAN 3 Kediri began on 25 August 1950 as the Islamic Religious School Teachers (SGAI) Kediri, located in western Kediri town square. A year later, SGAI changed its name to the First Religious Affairs of Teacher Education (PGAP N). In 1960 the name was changed to Education Master of Religious Affairs (PGAN) Kediri.

PGAN Kediri moved to new premises at Road No. 48 Letjend Soeprapto in 1966. Based on a Ministerial decree in 1978, Classes 1, 2 and 3 PGAN four years turned into Tsanawiyah while ex-PGAN 6 years turned into the PGA.

On July 1, 1992, PGAN converted into MAN 3 Kediri. First head of the school was Drs. H. Soeparno.

The school, which is located at Jalan Letjend Suprapto number 58, is one of the 25 in the Madrasah Aliyah Contract education quality improvement program in 2007 Achievements in Indonesia.
