= SMA Negeri 1 Malang =

Coordinates: 7°58′36.25″S 112°38′4.59″E

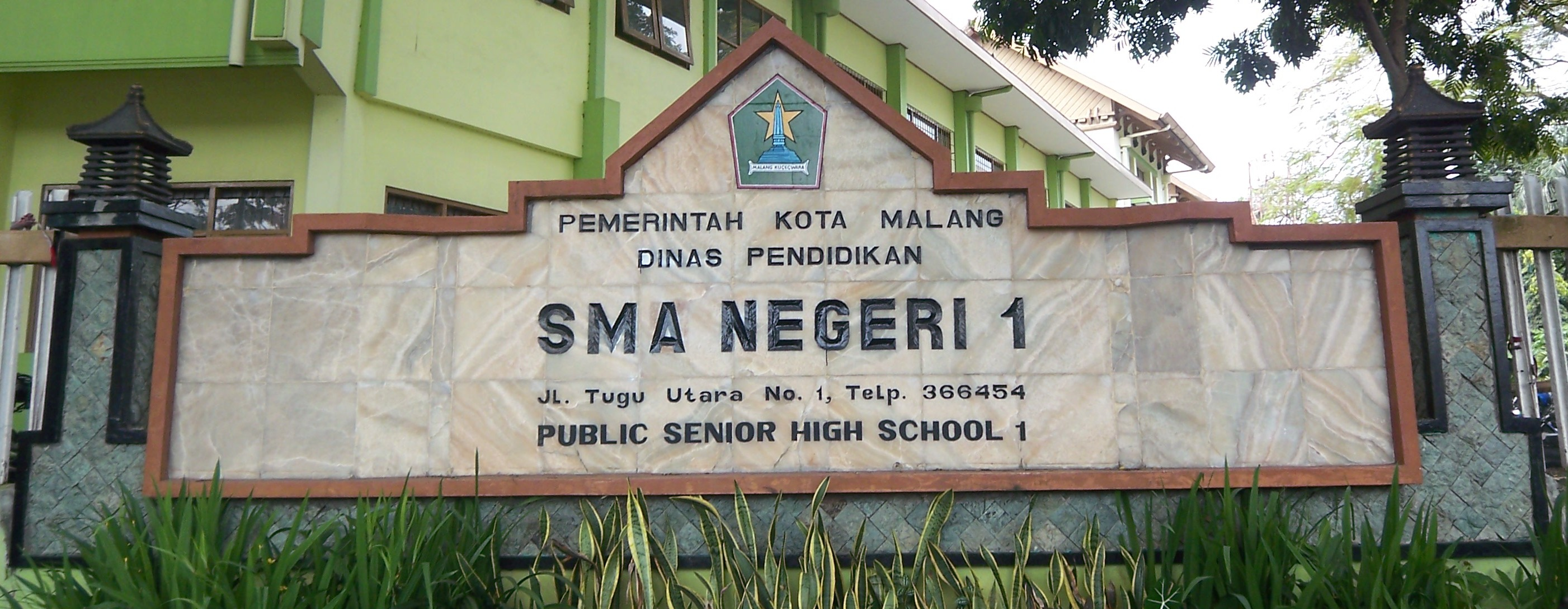
Entrance to the SMA Negeri 1 Malang

SMA Negeri 1 Malang, which stands for Sekolah Menengah Atas Negeri, is a state high school that is located at Tugu Utara No. 1, Malang, Jawa Timur, Indonesia. Together with SMA Negeri 4 and SMA Negeri 3, they are usually called SMA Tugu, since they are located at Tugu, one of the most beautiful and famous landscapes in Malang.

The history of the school began with the Dutch colonization many centuries ago.
