= Sekolah Menengah Atas Kristen Penabur Gading Serpong =

Coordinates: 6°14′7.1″S 106°37′35.8″E

Sekolah Menengah Atas Kristen PENABUR Gading Serpong
- Gading Serpong; Tangerang, Banten 15810; Indonesia

Information
- Type: Private
- Motto: Iman, Ilmu, Pelayanan (Faith, Knowledge, and (Spiritual) Ministry)
- Religious affiliation: Christianity and open for all other beliefs
- Opened: 2002
- Principal: Thomas Kristo (2022-), Budiasih (2016-2022), Satijan (2012-2016), Etiwati (2009-2012), Endang (2004-2009), Lo Sing Kim (2000-2004), Thomas Susanto (1999-2000).
- Staff: approx. 150
- Grades: 10,11,12 in Science and Social majors
- Enrollment: approx. 500/year, 1400+ in total
  - Grade 10: 7 Science class, 3 Social class (as of November 2017)
  - Grade 11: 7 Science class, 3 Social class (as of November 2017)
  - Grade 12: 8 Science class, 3 Social class (as of November 2017)
- Colors: Blue, Red, Yellow
- Nickname: SMAK GS or AGS
- Website: Official website

Sekolah Menengah Atas Kristen PENABUR Gading Serpong, often shortened to SMAK PENABUR Gading Serpong (or AGS), is a Christian private high school located in Gading Serpong, Tangerang, Banten, Indonesia. It is organized by the BPK PENABUR Jakarta Foundation. The school provides tenth to twelfth grade programs as implemented nationally in Indonesia. The school has two programs, one being the regular senior high school program and the other the Brilliant Class program for academically gifted children. This school used to be known as SMAK 6 PENABUR but the name was changed because its location is outside Jakarta.

The school is located within the same complex as SMPK Penabur Gading Serpong, SDK Penabur Gading Serpong, and TKK Penabur Gading Serpong.

== Courses offered ==
There are 2 majors available: science and social. Students who picked science as their major has to pick all Science lessons, Compulsory lessons, and 1 Art lesson. Socials students therefore has to pick all Social lessons, Compulsory lessons, and also 1 Art lesson. In Grade 10, Students are required to pick 1 Language lesson and 1 lesson from the opposing major, while Grade 11 and 12 students are required to choose one out of the two. As of August 2016, the school uses the 2013 curriculum standard deployed by the Indonesian Minister of Education.

== Brilliant Class ==
The Brilliant Class is a program for gifted students in science. They are taught in accordance with both the Indonesian national curriculum and the University of Cambridge International Examinations curriculum. They are trained to compete in national and international competitions, especially in science majors. The teachers for the Brilliant Class typically have higher credential than those that teach the regular classes ranging from lecturers at the University of Indonesia and science olympiad trainers. Non-science subjects are still taught by regular teachers.

== Achievements ==
Most of the achievements of the school come from the Brilliant Class' students as they are specially trained. The school's students have achieved medals in the National Science Olympiad as well as the International Science Olympiad. However, there are also non academic achievers such as Maria Felicia Gunawan, who in 2015 was in charge of carrying the Indonesian Flag at the National Palace on Indonesia's independence day.
