= Kolese Loyola =

Loyola College
- Indonesian: Kolese Loyola

Location
- Jl. Karanganyar No.37; Semarang, Central Java; Indonesia; 6°58′55.24″S 110°25′34.24″E

Information
- Type: Private secondary school
- Motto: Latin: Ad Maiorem Dei Gloriam (For the Greater Glory of God)
- Religious affiliation: Catholicism
- Denomination: Jesuits
- Patron saint: Ignatius of Loyola
- Established: August 1949; 77 years ago
- Founder: Society of Jesus
- Rector: Pater Yakobus Rudiyanto, S.J.
- Principal: Pr. Martinus Juprianto Bulu Toding, S.J. (from 2021)
- Headmaster: Pr. Antonius Vico Christiawan, S.J. (from 2018)
- Colors: Blue and yellow
- Slogan: Competence, Conscience, Compassion, Commitment
- Website: www.loyola-smg.sch.id

Kolese Loyola, also referred by its acronym LC or Loyola College is a private Catholic secondary school located in Semarang, Central Java, Indonesia. The school was established by the Indonesian Province of the Society of Jesus in 1949. The school's name is derived from its patron saint, St. Ignatius of Loyola.

== Mission and aims ==
Kolese Loyola's mission is popularly known as 4C: Competence, Conscience, Compassion, and Commitment. Its motto is Ad Maiorem Dei Gloriam (AMDG) or "For the Greater Glory of God" and "Men and Women For Others".

== Facilities ==
A new building has been used since 2004 with some new facilities, including:

- Physics, chemistry, biology, and computer laboratories
- Sport facilities: a football field, basketball court, tennis court, badminton court, indoor and outdoor volleyball court, athletic equipment, and others
- Multimedia-equipped rooms
- Cafeteria
- Library
- As a Catholic school, Kolese Loyola has a chapel that is used to hold daily and Sunday Masses
- An amphitheatre for special occasions
- A lounge built for KEKL (Keluarga Eks Kolese Loyola / Alumni)

== Loyola College anthem ==
Kolese kita Loyola perguruan tercipta
(Our college, Loyola, created university)

Mengasuh manusia sejati
(Minding and teaching true humans)

Menuju jiwa yang jujur
(To the souls of honesty)

Cinta ilmu, olahraga, seni, dan budaya
(Loving educations, sports, arts, and cultures)

Pikiran dan kehendak hati di latih secara teratur
(Mind and will are trained regularly)

Arah tujuan praputra murni penuh susila
(Human's directions that’s pure and full of decency)

Mengabdi bangsa karna Tuhan
(Serving the nation for God)

Negara adil dan makmur
(Fair and prosperous country)

Cinta bangsa sluruh nusa penuh cita-cita
(Love the homeland's nation, full of ideals)

Slamanya kita usahakan supaya berbudi yang luhur
(Forever we strive so that we have a noble virtue)

== Notable alumni ==
- Jubing Kristianto, Indonesian guitarist, winner of Distinguished Award at Yamaha Guitar Fest in 1984 (Southeast Asia)
- Garin Nugroho, Indonesian film director
- Christianto Wibisono, Indonesian business analyst
- Purnomo Yusgiantoro, Indonesia's Minister of Defense (2004-2009, 2009–2014)

== See also ==
- Education in Indonesia
- List of Jesuit schools
- List of schools in Indonesia
