= Trinitas Senior High School =

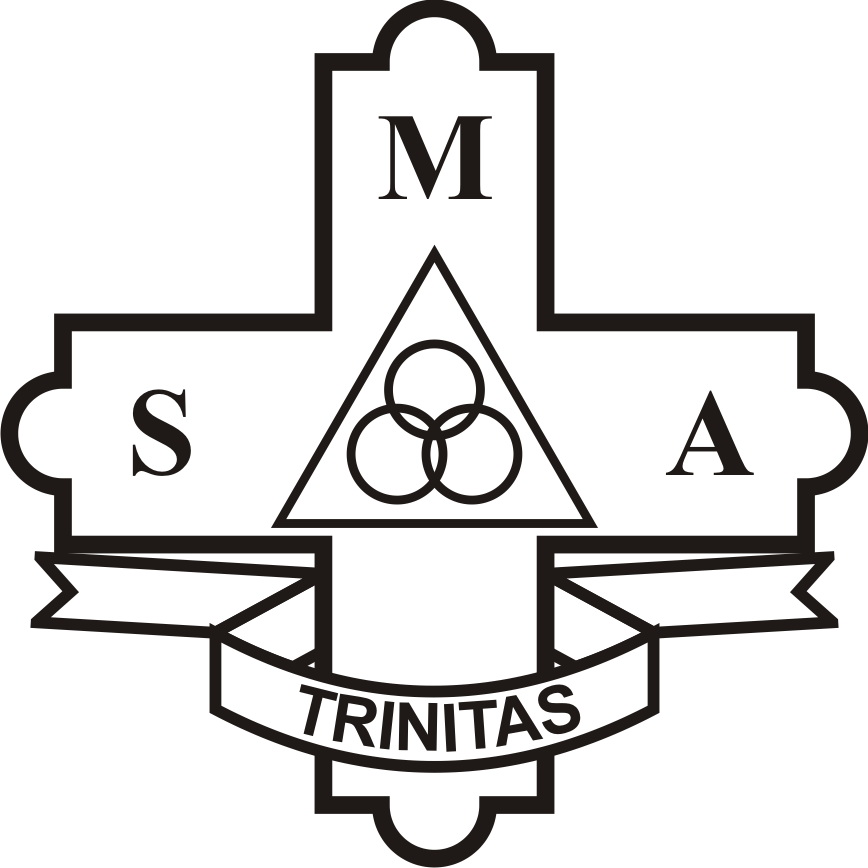

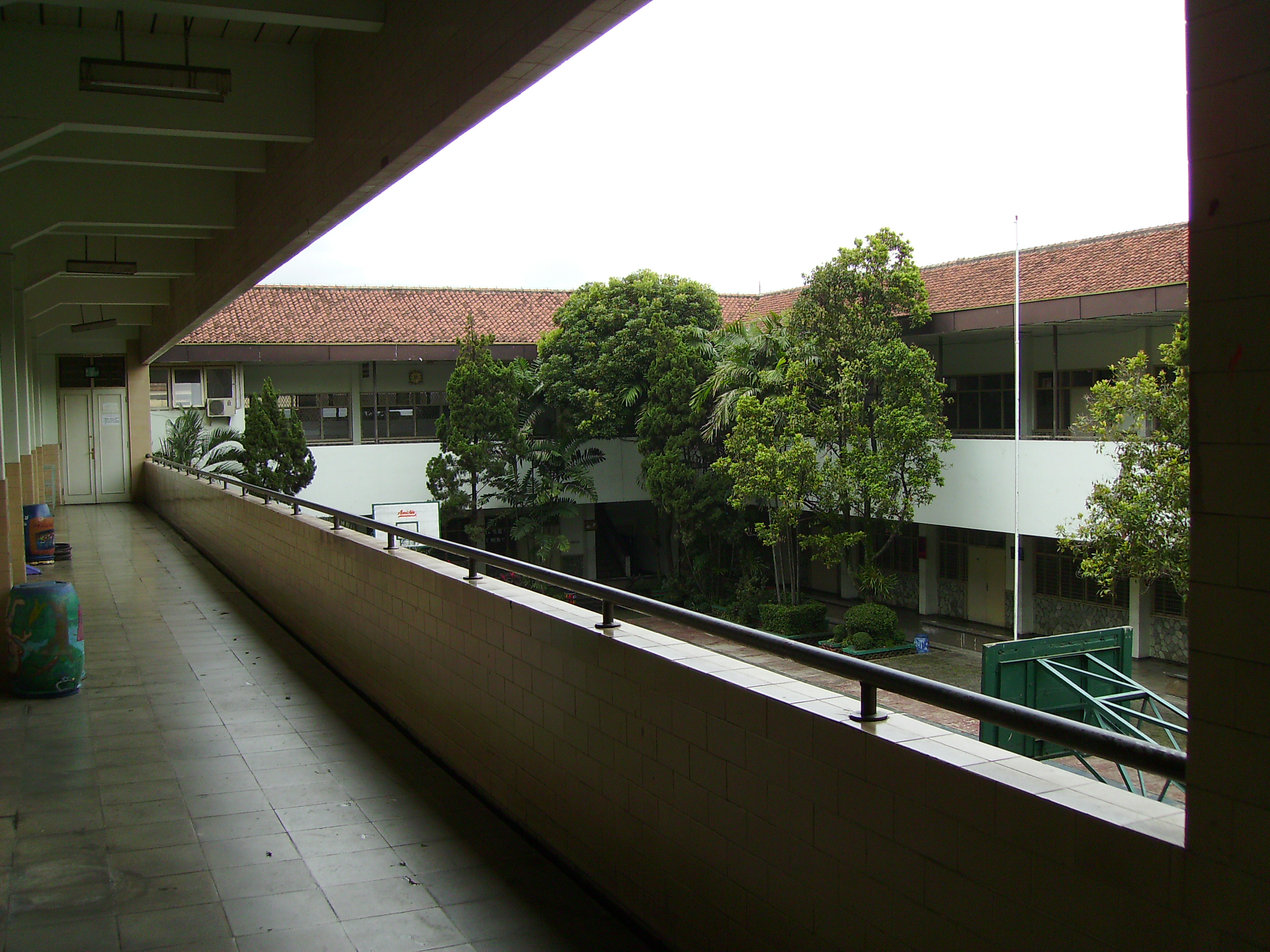

Location
- Bandung, West Java; Indonesia
- 6°55′01″S 107°35′30″E

Information
- Other name: SMA Trinitas Bandung
- School type: Independent school
- Motto: To Seek The Best For All
- Religious affiliation: Roman Catholic
- Founded: 1963; 63 years ago
- Founder: Sisters of Divine Providence
- Headmaster: Sr. Susana, SDP
- Age: 14 to 18
- Houses: 1
- Website: www.smatrinitas.sch.id

Trinitas Senior High School is a Roman Catholic private high school located in Bandung, West Java, Indonesia. The school was founded in 1963 by the Sisters of Divine Providence under the local name SMA Trinitas Bandung.

== Facilities ==
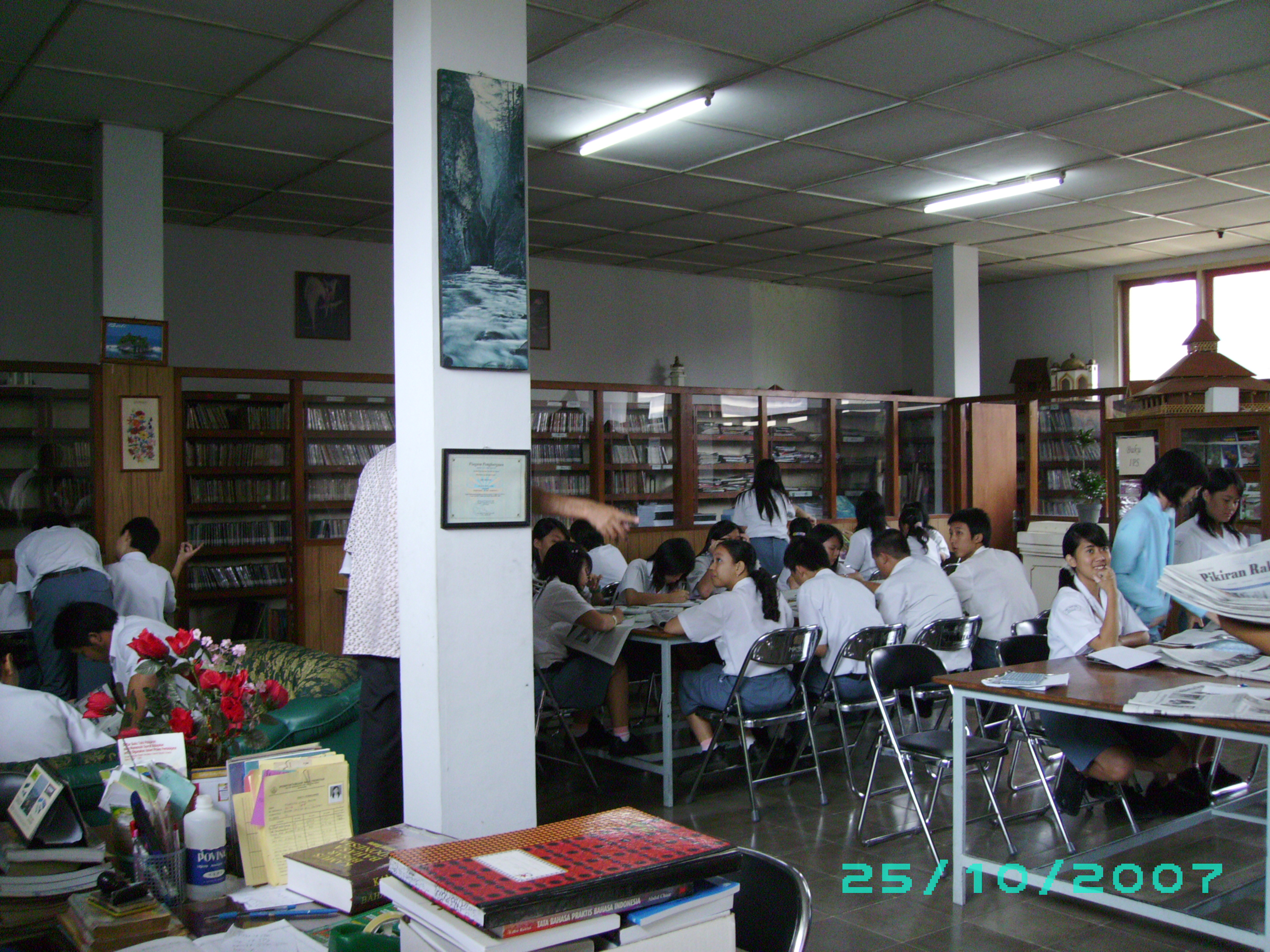

In 2009, Trinitas Senior High School together with all the building in Indonesian CDP complex was upgraded and includes the following: Library, Staff Room, Canteen, Gymnasium, Basketball court, Language Laboratory, Biology Laboratory, Physics Laboratory, Chemistry Laboratory, Computer Laboratory, and Multimedia Room.

== Uniform ==
Uniform worn before 2010: National uniform (every Sunday and Thursday)

- Girl: white shirt, grey skirt, school badge, belt, pink school socks, black sneakers
- Boy: white shirt, grey pants, school badge, belt, green school socks, black sneakers

School uniform (every Tuesday, Wednesday, and Friday)

- Girl: white shirt, pink skirt, pink vest, school badge, belt, pink School socks, black sneakers
- Boy: white shirt, green pants, school belt, belt, green school socks, black sneakers

Saturday school uniform (every Saturday)

- Girl: black polo shirt or green T-Shirt, grey skirt, belt, pink school socks, shoes
- Boy: black polo shirt or green T-Shirt, grey pants, belt, pink school socks, shoes

Gym suit

- Girl: blue T-Shirt, navy blue bloomers, pink school socks, black sneakers
- Boy: blue T-Shirt, navy blue trousers, green school socks, black sneakers

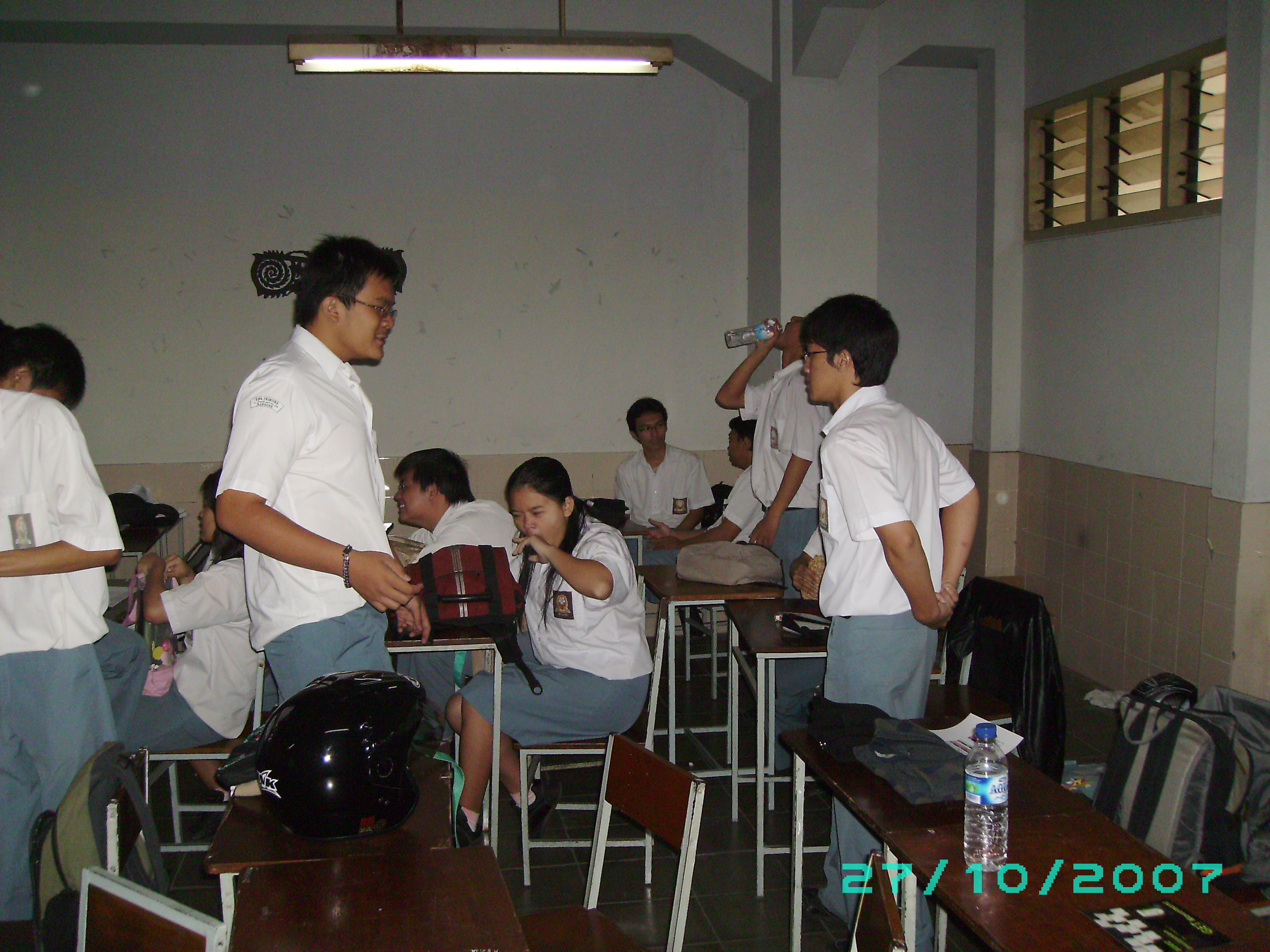
Students wearing National uniform

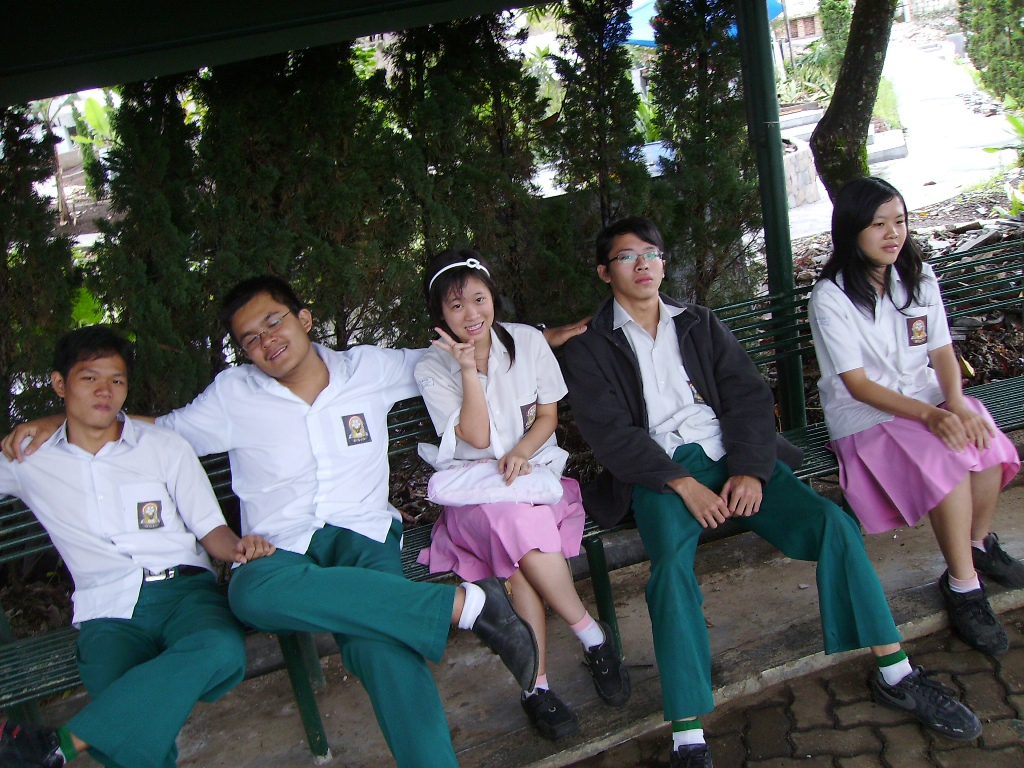
Students wearing school uniform

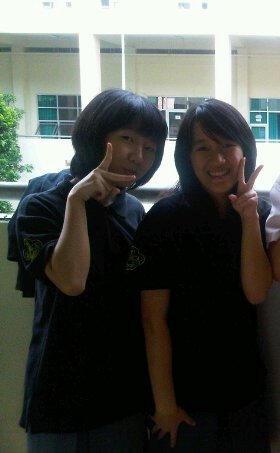
Students wearing school polo shirt

Uniform worn by the generation after 2010: National uniform (every Sunday and Thursday)

- Girl: white shirt, grey skirt, school badge, belt, pink school socks, black sneakers
- Boy: white shirt, grey pants, school badge, belt, green school socks, black sneakers

School uniform

- Girl: white shirt, tartan skirt in white, black, and pink, school badge, belt, white and pink school socks, black sneakers
- Boy: tartan shirt in white, black, and pink, white pants, school badge, belt, white and black school socks, black sneakers

Gym suit Girl: blue T-shirt, navy blue bloomers, pink school socks, black sneakers Boy: blue T-shirt, navy blue trousers, green school socks, black sneakers

Some changes in uniform:

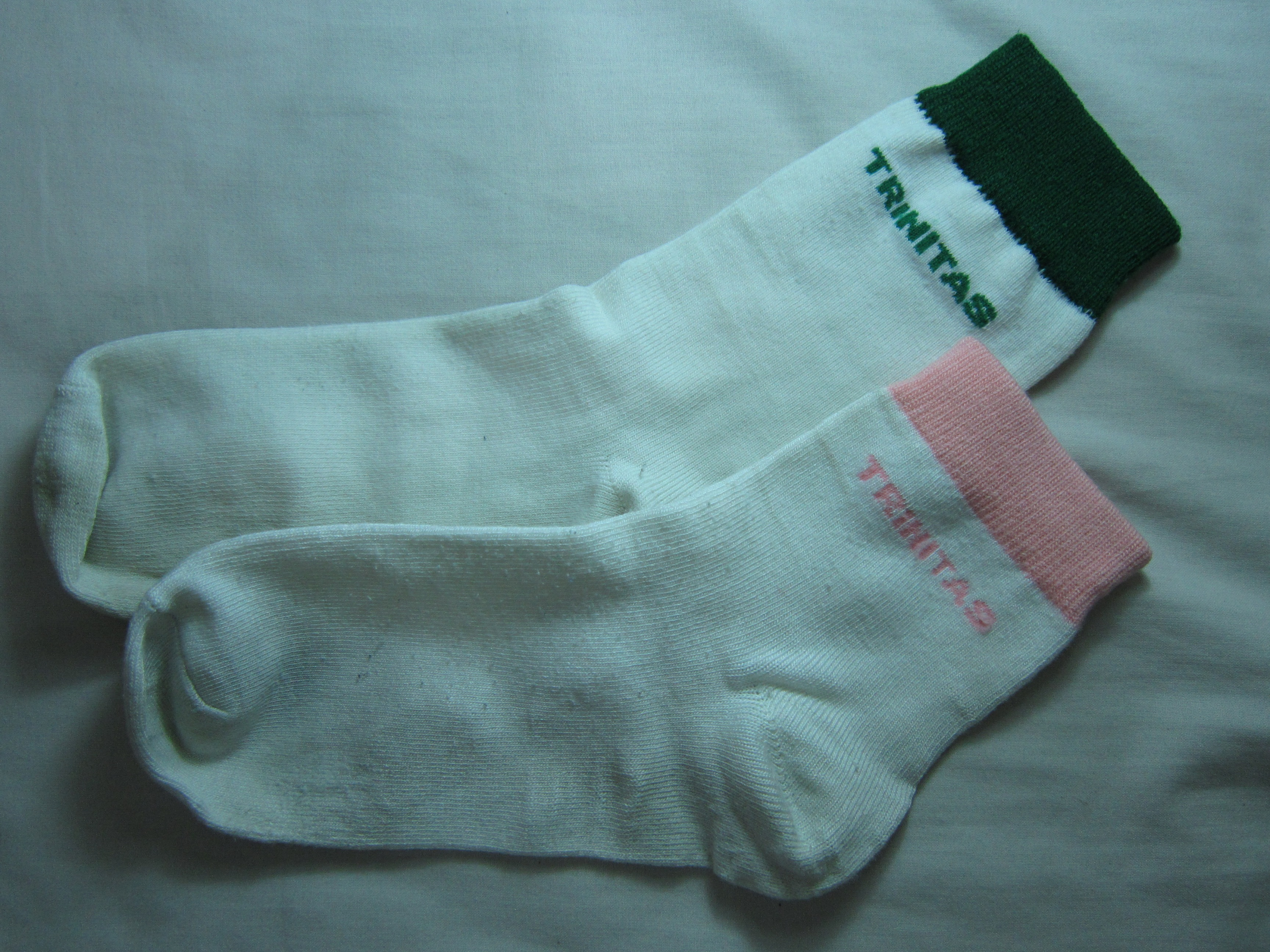
Old Trintias SHS socks. Pink one (for girls) much shorter than the green one (for boy's)

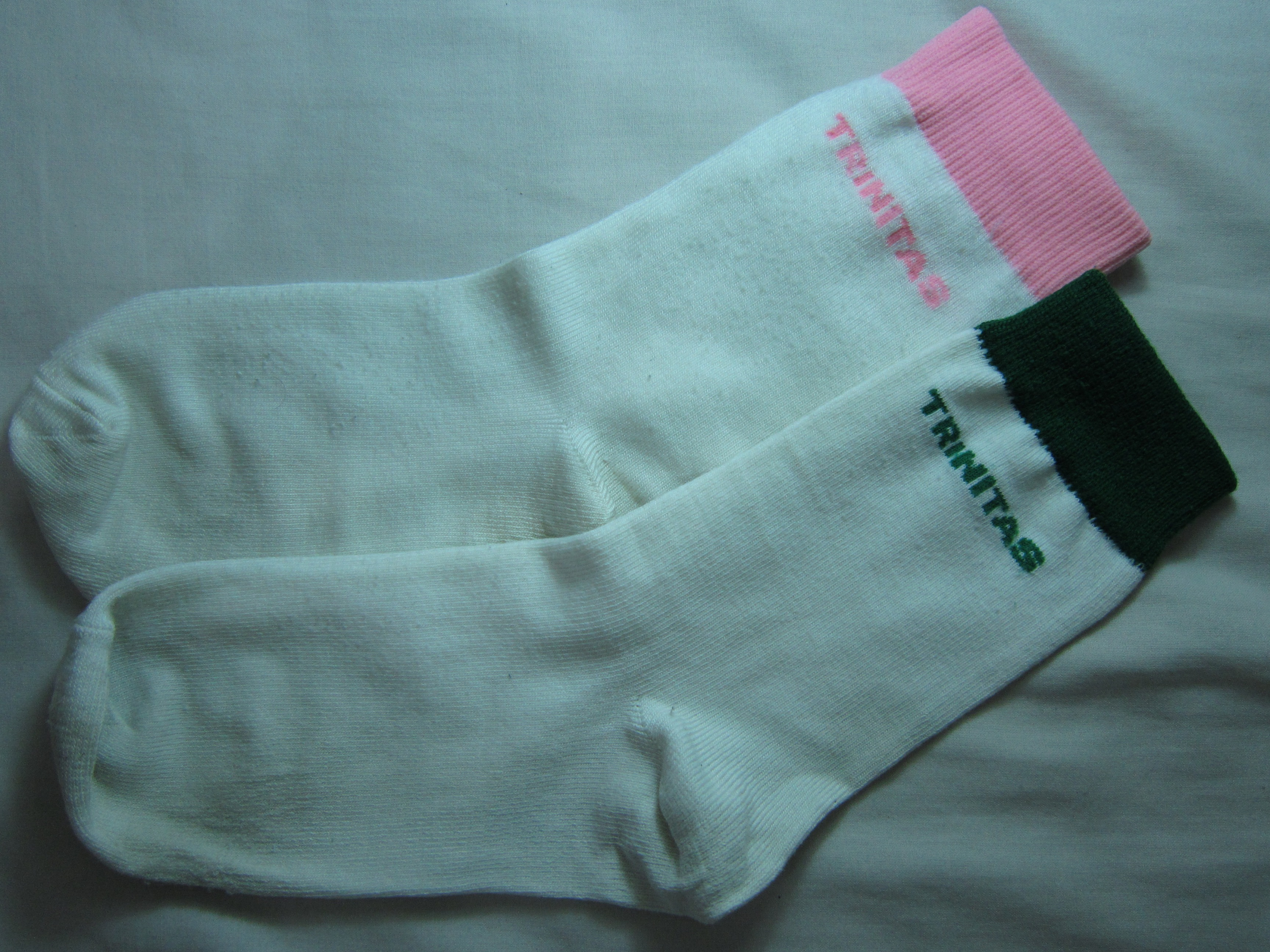
Old Trintias SHS socks. Pink socks elongated

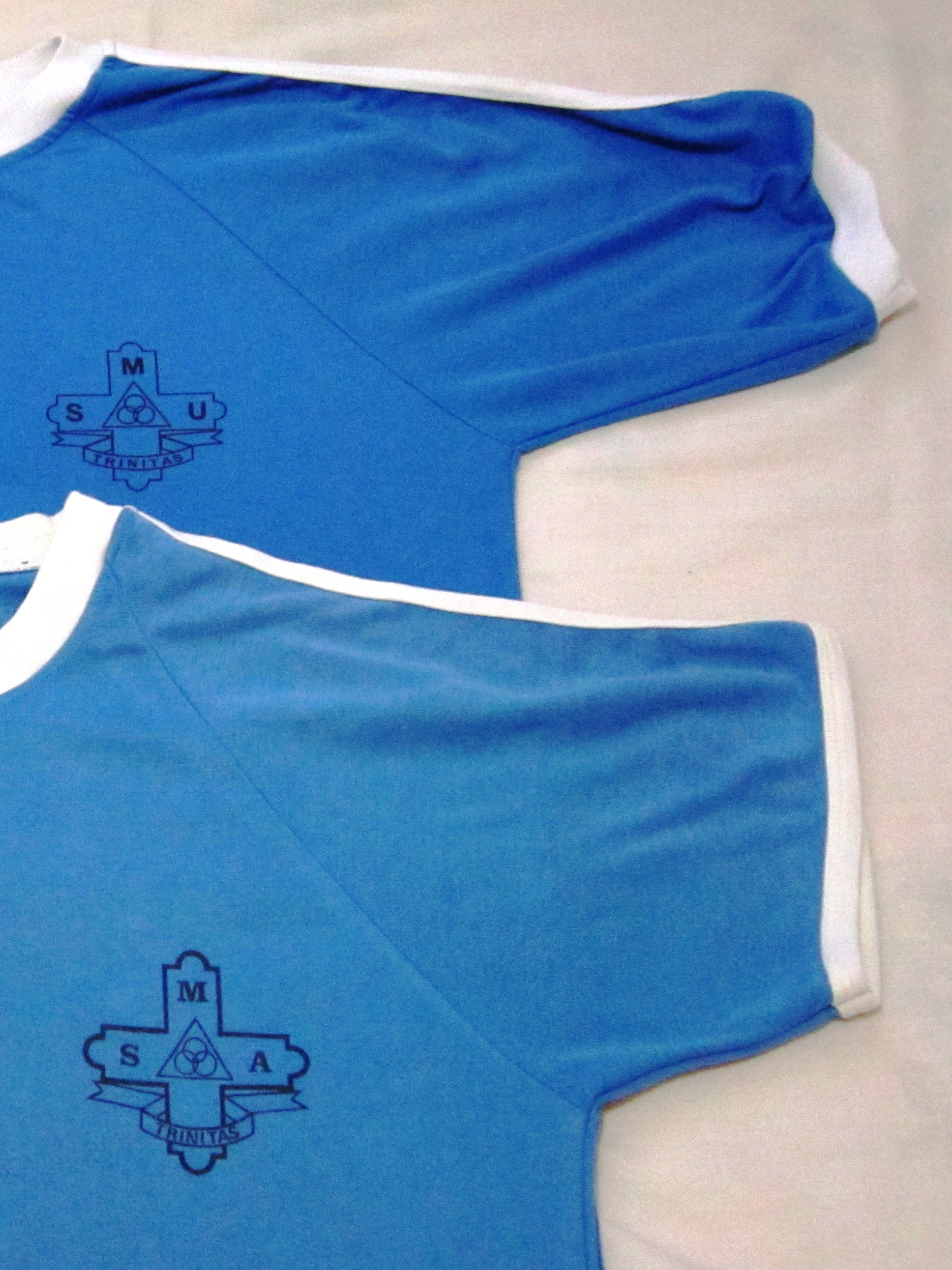
Old Trinitas SHS gym suit's sleeve (under) elongated (upper)
