= Frances Yung =

Chinese-Canadian businesswoman and heiress

Frances Yung Ming-fong
- Born: December 7, 1972 (age 53); British Hong Kong
- Education: Institut Le Rosey; Stanford University
- Spouses: Brian David Li Man-bun (m. 1993; div. 2001); Hu Haifeng (m. 2002; div. 2013)
- Children: 5
- Father: Larry Yung Chi-kin
- Relatives: Rong Yiren (grandfather); Yang Jianqing (grandmother); Rong Desheng (great-grandfather)

Frances Yung Ming-fong (born 1972) is a Chinese-Canadian businesswoman and heiress, known for her connection to the CITIC Pacific foreign exchange losses scandal. The daughter of CITIC Chairman Larry Yung, in 2007, Yung was ranked the 9th on the Forbes Chinese billionaires list.

== Biography ==
Yung attended Benenden School in England before following her brother Carl in attending Institut Le Rosey in Rolle, Switzerland. During her school years, she excelled in a range of sports and represented her schools in Equestrian. She holds coterm Bachelor’s and Master’s degrees in Economics and Management Science & Engineering from Stanford University. She provided major support to help launch the Knight-Hennessy Scholars.

Yung joined CITIC Pacific in 1995 and held the Director of Group Finance role since at least 2007 before transitioning to Citadel LLC. She sits on the board of CITIC Pacific and Bank of East Asia. She also served as a member of Chinese General Chamber of Commerce and a Member of the National Committee of the Chinese People's Political Consultative Conference.

== Personal life and family ==
Yung’s first marriage, to Brian David Li Man-bun, ended in divorce, they have three children. She later married Hu Haifeng, the couple have two daughters. Her daughters debuted at the Queen Charlotte's Ball at Kensington Palace in London and took part in their paternal grandfather's tour of Russia.
