= Guoan =

Guoan means national security in Chinese (the word itself was a combination of two words: country and safety/peace), may refer to company related to CITIC Guoan Group:

- Beijing Guoan F.C., Chinese Super League football team founded by CITIC Guoan Group, now owned by Sinobo Group
- Beijing Guoan (Superleague Formula team), racing team of Beijing Guoan F.C., competing in the Superleague Formula
- CITIC Guoan Information Industry, Chinese enterprise in the computer network infrastructure and information service industries
