= List of Beijing Guoan F.C. chairmen and general managers =

Beijing Guoan F.C. is a professional Chinese football club that currently participates in the Chinese Super League under licence from the Chinese Football Association (CFA). The team is based in the Chaoyang District in Beijing and their home stadium is the Workers' Stadium with a seating capacity of 68,000. The real estate company Sinobo Group has full ownership of the club. Beijing Guoan F.C. was founded as a professional team by the CITIC Guoan Group, and was a subsidiary of the CITIC Group until 2014.

This is a list of historical and current Beijing Guoan F.C. chairmen & general managers.

== List of chairmen ==
Below is the official history of Beijing Guoan F.C. chairmen until the present day.

#	Name	Birthyear	Former occupation	From	To	Ref
1	(China) Wang Jun	1941	Deputy general manager, CITIC Group	29 December 1992	6 January 2002	
2	(China) Li Jianyi	1967	Deputy general manager, CITIC Guoan Group Corporation	7 January 2002	30 December 2016	
-	(China) Luo Ning^{1}	1959	Assistant general manager, CITIC Group	7 January 2002	30 December 2016	
3	(China) Zhou Jinhui	1974	Chairman, Sinobo Group	30 December 2016	Incumbent	

== List of general managers ==
Below is the official history of Beijing Guoan F.C. general managers until the present day.

#	Name	Birthyear	Former occupation	From	To	Ref
1	(China) Liu Wenxiong		Principal, Beijing Xiannongtan Sports Training School	1993	1995	
2	(China) Zhang Lu	1951	Deputy director, Beijing Institute of Sports Science	1996	1 November 2000	
3	(China) Yang Zuwu	1947	Executive deputy general manager, Beijing Guoan F.C.	1 November 2000	7 January 2002	
4	(China) Ma Bing	1960	Director, Beijing Sport University Football Teaching and Research Office	8 January 2002	3 October 2003	
-	(China) Zhang Lu^{2}	1951	Vice chairman, Beijing Guoan F.C.	4 October 2003	10 December 2003	
5	(China) Yang Zuwu	1947	Coach team leader, Beijing Guoan F.C.	11 December 2003	15 August 2005	
6	(China) Li Xiaoming	1955	Assistant general manager, CITIC Guoan Group Corporation	16 August 2005	31 December 2009	
7	(China) Gao Chao	1956	General manager, Beijing Gao Chao Culture Communication Co., Ltd	1 January 2010	31 January 2016	
8	(China) Shen Li	1969	Chairman, Guoan (Peking) Media of Technology Co., Ltd	1 February 2016	6 January 2017	
9	(China) Li Ming^{3}	1971	Head coach, China national under-20 football team	2 March 2017	27 December 2025	

== List of sporting directors ==
Below is the official history of Beijing Guoan F.C. sporting directors until the present day.

#	Name	Birthyear	Former occupation	From	To	Ref
1	(Germany) Matthias Brosamer	1982	Developer of international relations, VfB Stuttgart	27 December 2025	Incumbent	

== Notes ==
^1 Club's de facto top decision maker as vice chairman (2002-2009) and honorary chairman (2009-2016).
^2 Served as interim general manager.
^3 On 21 May, the Chinese FA announced another round of penalties and sanctions as a result of ongoing anti-corruption investigations into Chinese football. Li Ming received a five-year ban from footballing activities as he was found to have engaged in bribery and conducted improper financial transactions whilst at Beijing Guoan.
