= Chinese Bank =

Chinese Bank may refer to:

- List of Chinese banks
- Hongkong Chinese Bank: a defunct bank in Hong Kong, now merged to CITIC Ka Wah Bank
- Macau Chinese Bank: a bank in Macau
- Chinese American Bank, an overseas Chinese bank in the United States headquartered in New York City, with branch offices in Chinatown, Manhattan and in Chinatown, Flushing
- Chinese Central Bank
- Chinese Development Bank
