= Lei Siwei =

Chinese politician (born 1966)

- 雷思维

Vice Governor of Gansu
- In office January 2023 – March 2026

Personal details
- Born: June 1966 (age 60) Jingning County, Gansu, China
- Party: Chinese Communist Party (expelled in 2026)

Lei Siwei (Chinese: 雷思维; born June 1966) is a former Chinese politician, who was served as the vice governor of Gansu between 2023 and 2026. Previously he also served as the party secretary of Jiayuguan, the director of Gansu Provincial Natural Resource Department, and the director of Gansu Provincial Ecological and Environment Department. He was a delegate to the 14th National People's Congress.

== Career ==
Lei was born in Jingning County, Gansu in June 1966. He was graduated from the university and enrolled to Baiyin Nonferrous Metal Corporation, a state-owned enterprise in June 1986. He was served as the deputy director of technology center, the deputy general engineer, the deputy general manager and the general manager during this period.

In March 2018, Lei left state-owned enterprise and served as the director of Gansu Provincial Environment Department. The department was changed to Gansu Provincial Ecological and Environment Department in October.

In 2020, Lei was appointed as the director of Gansu Provincial Natural Resources Department. In July 2021, he was appointed as the party secretary of Jiayuguan.

In January 2023, Lei was appointed as the vice governor of Gansu. He was appointed as the standing member of the CCP Gansu Provincial Committee in June 2025.

== Investigation ==
On 17 March 2026, Lei was suspected of "serious violations of laws and regulations" by the Central Commission for Discipline Inspection (CCDI), the party's internal disciplinary body, and the National Supervisory Commission, the highest anti-corruption agency of China. His deputy governor post was removed on 25 March, and the delegate to the NPC was dismissed on 30 April. Lei was expelled from the party and dismissed from public office on 11 September.

Party political offices
Preceded by Li Zhongke	Party Secretary of Jiayuguan; 2021–2023	Succeeded by Liu Yongsheng
