= Karazhanbas oil field =

Oil field in Mangystau Province, Kazakhstan

Coordinates: 44°36′25.9″N 54°2′27.4″E

Karazhanbas Oil Field
- Country: Kazakhstan
- Region: Mangystau Province
- Offshore/onshore: onshore
- Operator: CITIC Resources

Field history
- Discovery: 1984
- Start of production: 2005

Production
- Estimated oil in place: 18 million tonnes (~ 21.5×10^{6} m^{3} or 135 million bbl)

The Karazhanbas Oil Field is an oil field located in Mangystau Province in Kazakhstan. It was discovered in 1984 and developed by CITIC Resources. The oil field is operated and owned by CITIC Resources. The total proven reserves of the oil field are around 135 million barrels (18 million tonnes), and production is centered on 18,600 barrels per day (2,960 m^{3}/d).
