= CITIC Trust =

State-owned investment company

- Company type: Subsidiary
- Founded: 1 March 1988
- Headquarters: Beijing, China
- Key people: Chen Yisong (chairman)
- Revenue: ▲CN¥10.263 billion (2015)
- Operating income: ▲CN¥4.057 billion (2015)
- Net income: ▲CN¥3.145 billion (2015)
- AUM: ▲CN¥1.023 trillion (2015)
- Total assets: ▲CN¥23.799 billion (2015)
- Total equity: ▼CN¥17.995 billion (2015)
- Owner: Chinese Central Government, joint venture of Itochu–CP; and public shareholders; (via CITIC Limited (100%))
- Number of employees: 528 (2015)
Parent
CITIC Corporation	(direct)
CITIC Limited	(intermediate)
CITIC Group	(intermediate)
Ministry of Finance	(intermediate)
State Council	(ultimate)
- Website: trust.ecitic.com
- Footnotes / references in a consolidated basis

CITIC Trust
- Simplified Chinese: 中信信托
- Traditional Chinese: 中信信託
Transcriptions

CITIC Trust Co., Ltd. is a Chinese-owned investment management company, with license to create private equity fund (as trust). The company was a subsidiary of CITIC Group. However, after a reverse takeover, CITIC Limited (SEHK: 267) became the parent company for 100% stake (via CITIC Corporation Limited and CITIC Industrial Investment Group Corporation Limited).

== History ==
CITIC Industrial Trust Investment Corporation (Chinese: 中信兴业信托投资公司) was founded on 1 March 1988 as a subsidiary of CITIC Group (formerly China International Trust Investment Corporation). In 2002 CITIC Trust acquired the trust business from the parent company and renamed to CITIC Trust Investment Co., Ltd. (Chinese: 中信信托投资有限责任公司). The share capital had increased to CN¥507.73 million in 2003. In 2006 CITIC Capital, another subsidiary of CITIC Group, had also acquired 20% stake of the company, which was re-acquired by CITIC Group.

In 2014 the share capital of CITIC Trust was increased from CN¥1.2 billion to CN¥10 billion by adjusting the share premium.

== Shareholders ==
CITIC Trust was wholly owned by CITIC Group (and later CITIC Limited).

In 2012 CITIC Group incorporated a subsidiary "CITIC Corporation Limited" (Chinese: 中国中信股份有限公司), and the stake of CITIC Trust (80%) was transferred to the subsidiary. However, the initial public offering of CITIC Corporation Limited was abandoned; It was takeover by CITIC Pacific (SEHK: 267), another subsidiary of CITIC Group in 2014 as a reverse IPO; the Chinese name of CITIC Corporation Limited had also dropped the word "shares" (Chinese: 中国中信有限公司).

In 2012 also saw another direct shareholder of CITIC Trust for 20% stake, Shanghai-based "CITIC East China (Group) Corporation Limited" (Chinese: 中信华东(集团)有限公司) was renamed to CITIC Industrial Investment Group Corporation Limited (Chinese: 中信兴业投资集团有限公司). The stake of CITIC Industrial Investment Group has also transferred to CITIC Corporation Limited, making CITIC Corporation Limited owned 80% stake of CITIC Trust directly and 20% indirectly.

== Joint ventures ==
CITIC Trust formed a joint venture with China Guodian Corporation. The joint venture was an in-house investment management company for Guodian. The joint venture raised money from the general public to invest in Guodian's projects.

== Equity investments ==
CITIC Trust was an investor in Otis Elevator (China) Investment from 1998 to 2001. In 2001 the 3% stake was sold back to Otis Far East Holdings.

CITIC Trust was a shareholder of China Guangfa Bank in 2006 for 20% shares.
