= Andrew Chan =

Andrew Chan may refer to:

- Andrew Chan (bishop) (born 1962), Hong Kong archbishop
- Andrew Chan (drug smuggler) (1984–2015), Australian drug trafficker and member of the Bali Nine, who was executed in Indonesia
- Andrew Chan (judge) (born 1961), Hong Kong judge

== See also ==
- Andrew Chang (born 1982), Canadian television journalist
