= Henry Fan =

Businessman and politician

Henry Fan SBS, JP

Chairman of the Hospital Authority
- Incumbent
- Assumed office 1 December 2019

Unofficial Member of the Executive Council of Hong Kong
- In office 1 November 2005 – 21 January 2009

Managing Director of CITIC Pacific
- In office 10 March 1990 – 8 April 2008
- Succeeded by: Chang Zhenming

Chairman of the Mandatory Provident Fund Schemes Authority
- In office 17 March 2007 – 17 March 2009
- Preceded by: Charles Lee
- Succeeded by: Anna Wu

Personal details
- Born: 2 June 1948 (age 78) Shanghai
- Relations: Fan Qin (ancestor); Fanny Law (sister)
- Education: University of Hong Kong; Beijing University

Henry Fan Hung Ling
- Traditional Chinese: 范鴻齡
- Simplified Chinese: 范鸿龄
Transcriptions
Standard Mandarin
- Hanyu Pinyin: Fàn Hónglíng
Yue: Cantonese
- Jyutping: Fan6 Hung4 Ling4

Henry Fan Hung Ling, SBS, JP (Chinese: 范鴻齡; born 2 June 1948 in Shanghai, Republic of China with family roots in Ningbo, Zhejiang) is a businessman and politician who served as the managing director of CITIC Pacific and the vice-chairman of Cathay Pacific Airways. He is now the chairman of Hospital Authority. He was a non-official member of the Executive Council of Hong Kong from 2007 to 2009. He was previously a barrister practising out of Temple Chambers in Hong Kong.

He is the elder brother of Fanny Law, a former Hong Kong Government official. He graduated from the University of Hong Kong and Peking University.

In September 2022, Fan lobbied for a "significant expansion" of traditional Chinese medicine used in Hong Kong's public healthcare. Days after, the Hospital Authority released a study claiming that traditional Chinese medicine could help long COVID symptoms; however, the study was not conducted in a scientific randomized controlled trial.

In November 2022, Fan tested positive for COVID.

In December 2022, Fan admitted that a scheme to hire overseas doctors was "very unsatisfactory," with only 9 of 65 applications given an offer.
