= Huang Longshi =

Chinese Go player

Personal information
- Full name: Huang Longshi
- Born: 1651/1654 China
- Died: circa 1700 China

Sport
- Rank: 7 dan

Huang Longshi 黃龍士 (1651/1654 – ?, also known as Huang Yuetian) is known as one of the greatest go players in history.

== Biography ==
Huang Longshi was said to be born around Shunzhi 8 or 11 during the Qing Dynasty (1651/1654). He was said to have died in his forties, but the exact date is unknown. Huang was born in Jiangyan near Taixian in China. His family was poor and he found that he could neglect his studies. However, he did not stop studying go, and soon become a strong enough player to earn money for his family.

As a child, Huang is said to have watched a prince agonize for hours over a critical position before finding the winning move; surprised at Huang's evident understanding of the game from having observed so many matches by strong players, the prince, delighted, gave the boy his own collection of go books to study from. By the time Huang was 16, he was the guoshou (national champion). He played a match with Sheng Dayou who was one of the strongest players of the older generation of champions. Huang pulled off a stunning 7 game victory in the match. He would continue defeating many top players, and would be praised by the go world.

Many people would now refer to him as Longshi, the Prodigy instead of his actual name. There is an excerpt about this in Seeing off Huang the Prodigy by Du Jun. It contained the following;

"Huang Qiu, the Prodigy, of Taizhou was known for being good at go at the age of 11. [...] which is how much he loved him."

While Huang gained most of reputation, he had a handful of rivals. There was only one other person in China who could match him, and that was Zhou Donghou. Although Huang would beat Zhou many times, Zhou always came back with new ideas that kept Huang from dominating the entire board, and was the one giving Huang advice to become stronger.

During the latter time of his life, Huang stayed as a house guest with Xu Xingyou. They would play many go games, of which Huang won. However, every once in a while when Xu would win a game, he would brag to his guests that he had beaten Huang. Once during one of their games, Huang would whisper to Xu that his skill was so superior that he had ought to give Xu a three-stone handicap. This had turned in the three stone Games of Blood and Tears, one of Huang's masterpieces. There was a story that had said Xu was the cause of Huang's death; seducing him with wine and women. It was said that Huang had coped with it for a while, until he died of a stroke. However, the story has been considered apocryphal as Huang and Xu were on a teacher-pupil relationship and Xu was very flattering of Huang.

A different, likewise unverified, account attributed to Lu Shichuan's Yi Xuan Yi Hua offers another version of their relationship: both men reportedly served as officials at the imperial court, with Huang known for his integrity and indifference to material gain, while Xu was said to cultivate close ties with court officials. According to this account, Xu once asked Huang to deliberately lose a match played before the Emperor Gao Zong (1736–1796), so that he might gain standing at court; Huang agreed, and when Xu won, the emperor revealed that the prize concealed in a gilded lacquer box was an appointment as prefectural governor, which went to Xu instead of Huang. At the time of his death, there was no record that he had left behind a wife or children. Only his masterpieces survived.

== Go playing style ==
He was also known for his contribution to go theory, particularly the concept of influence and density among groups of stones. He would use a lot of forcing moves to give his opponent inefficient shapes, and would attack while gaining territory. He also mastered amarigatachi (elongated shapes resulting from a failed attack), and his games are noted for frequent use of myoshu (妙手), striking and unexpected moves. He certainly had a unique style of go. He would play moves that were normal, that looked plain and clear. This left his opponents not knowing what to do, and if they would try to muscle him out, he would catch them with a surprising move or attack a weak point.

== Quotes ==
He has been praised many times during his life and after his death. Famous book publisher Deng Yuanhui had this to say about Huang;

"Longshi used his mind most meticulously. He sought to enter the deepest apertures. When it became a critical matter of life and death, and while the crowd were already helpless and at their wits' end, he was expertly exerting a subtle influence, and seeing more and more skilfull (sic) ideas and magical effects; the air would suddenly change... and from death he would re-enter life." He also said, "Longshi is like a heavenly spirit turned human. He is absolutely not of this world."

Huang was also regarded as one of the Fourteen Sages of ancient China by his contemporaries.

Go Seigen, considered to be one of the best go players of the 20th century, and of all time, had also commented on Huang. He had said that if Huang were alive during modern times, he would be a 13 dan. He also went on to say that Huang was at least the level of Honinbo Dosaku. Honinbo Dosaku is considered by many to be the greatest go player of all time.

Even with all this praise, Huang is barely known anywhere outside of China. Much of this had come from Inoue Inseki's impressions of Chinese go players during the 17th century in his famous book Hatsuyorun. He had said that Chinese players would have to take senaisen (handicap) from the top Japanese players, although there is no mention of Huang. This led many to believe that all Chinese go players were no match to the Japanese go players.

Hayashi Genbi had also said something along the lines of Chinese players being inferior, although he said this about Huang, "Huang Yuetian and Xu Xingyou are known as recent champions of the Qing era. In my opinion, for Yuetian this must be so, but for Xingyou, judging by the games given in this book (Gokyo Seimyo) he is far behind."
