= Shanghai Nanyang Model High School =

Coordinates: 31°12′11″N 121°25′57″E

- No.453 Lingling Road; No.1118 Tianyaoqiao Road (Southern Campus); Shanghai; China

Information
- Type: Public School; Boarding School; Shanghai Experimental and Key Paradigm School
- Motto: 勤 俭 敬 信 (Diligence, Thrift, Devotion, Honesty)
- Founded: 1901
- Founder: Sheng Xuanhuai (Chinese: 盛宣怀)
- Provost: Wang Hong (Chinese: 汪宏)
- Principal: Li Xiaoyu (Chinese: 李啸瑜)
- Faculty: c.130
- Grades: 10-12
- Enrollment: c.1,400
- Website: https://nmzx.xhedu.sh.cn

Shanghai Nanyang Model High School (上海南洋模范中学) is a public secondary school in Xuhui, Shanghai, China.

== History ==
In 1896, Nanyang Public School (Chinese: 南洋公學) was founded by an imperial edict issued by Guangxu Emperor, under the Business and Telegraphs Office of the imperial government. Four schools were then established: the Normal School, the School of Foreign Studies, a middle school and a high school.

In 1901, Sheng Xuanhuai, the first president of the school, also the Minister of Transportation responsible for proposing the idea to the Guangxu Emperor, then founded the predecessor of today's Shanghai Nanyang Model High School as an elementary school affiliated to the growing Nanyang Public School, which has now become Shanghai Jiao Tong University.

In 1927, the school was independent from the university and became private Nanyang Model Elementary/Middle School. Three years later, the senior department of the school was opened. In 1931, the school moved into Tianping campus. This campus is now the junior department of Nanyang Model High School which was separated from the school in 2000.

In 1956, the school became public school again and was renamed as Shanghai No. 71 High School.

In 1958, the name of the school was changed to Nanyang Model High School. In 1959, the school was appointed as one of the key schools in Shanghai.

In 2000, following the reform of the education system in Shanghai, the junior department of the school was closed and separated from the original campus and the school then became Shanghai Nanyang Model High School.

=== Names in history ===
Nanyang Model High School has the following different names in history:

- Elementary school affiliated to Nanyang Public School (1901–1927)
- Nanyang Model Elementary/Middle School (1927–1956) (Senior department of the school was opened in 1930.)
- Shanghai No. 71 High School (1956–1958)
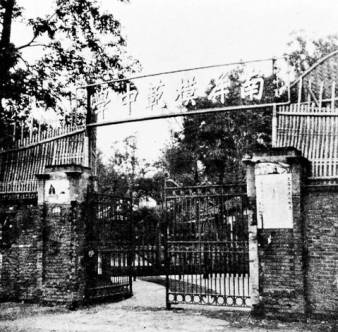
  The early years of Shanghai Nanyang Model High School
- Shanghai Nanyang Model High School (1958–present)

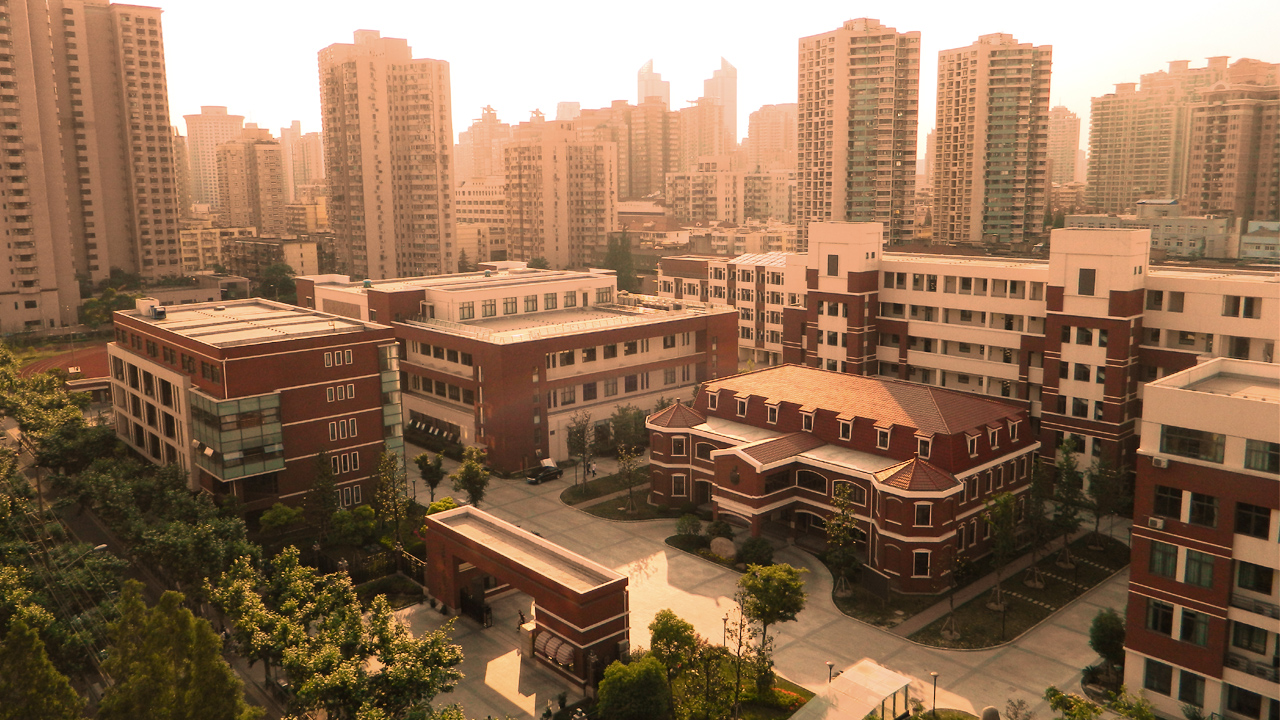
A whole view of Nanyang Model High School Lingling Campus

== Principals in history ==
There have been 12 principals in the school's history:

- Woo Tsin-hang (Wu Zhihui) (1901) (Chinese: 吴敬恒)
- Chen Maozhi (1901–1904) (Chinese: 陈懋治)
- Lin Kanghou (1904–1911) (Chinese: 林康侯)
- Shen Shukui (1911–1927) (Chinese: 沈叔逵)
- Shen Tongyi (1927–1966) (Chinese: 沈同一)
- Zhu Jiaze (1978–1979) (Chinese: 朱家泽)
- Zhao Xianchu (1979–1984) (Chinese: 赵宪初)
- Yuan Yipei (1989–1990) (Chinese: 袁义沛)
- Zhang Maochang (1990–2000) (Chinese: 张茂昌)
- Qian Yaobang (2001–2005) (Chinese: 钱耀邦)
- Gao Yi (2005–2019) (Chinese: 高屹)
- Li Xiaoyu (2019–present) (Chinese: 李啸瑜)

== Famous alumni ==
- Hsu Mo, diplomat of Republic of China
- Zhicheng (Alvin) Jiang, grandchild of the third paramount leader of China Jiang Zemin
- Larry Yung, child of 5th Vice President of the People's Republic of China Rong Yiren
- Chen Haosu, Chairperson of the Chinese People's Association for Friendship with Foreign Countries
- Zhou Jiannan, politician
- Li Yuanchao, Vice President of the People's Republic of China
