= Hongkong Chinese Limited =

Property and holding company

- logo of Hongkong Chinese Limited, same as Lippo group
- Formerly: The HKCB Bank Holding
- Company type: public
- Traded as: SEHK: 655
- Industry: Real estate, equity investment
- Founded: 20 October 1992
- Headquarters: 24/th, Tower 1, Lippo Centre, Hong Kong Island, Hong Kong
Key people
Stephen Riady	(chairman)
John Lee	(CEO)
- Revenue: ▲HK$1.327 billion (2015–16)
- Net income: ▼HK$204 million (2015–16)
- Total assets: ▼HK$11.417 billion (2015–16)
- Total equity: HK$10.501 billion (2015–16)
Owner
Riady family via Lippo Limited	(65.84%)
Farallon Capital	(9.98%)
public shareholders	(24.18%)
- Parent: Lippo Limited (SEHK: 226)
- Website: hkchinese.com.hk
- Footnotes / references in consolidated financial statement; financial year ended on 31 March

Hongkong Chinese Limited is a Bermuda-incorporated Hong Kong listed company. It was the holding company of Hongkong Chinese Bank, which was sold in 2002. The listed company now engaged in real estate development in China and had properties in Singapore. Hongkong Chinese Limited is an indirect subsidiary of Lippo Capital, which was owned by Indonesian entrepreneur Mochtar Riady and his family members. The chairman of Hongkong Chinese Limited, Stephen Riady, is the son of Mochtar.

== History ==
The HKCB Bank Holding Company Limited was incorporated in 1992 (and registered as a foreign company in Hong Kong on 20 October 1992). In 2001, the subsidiary Hongkong Chinese Bank was sold to CITIC Ka Wah Bank for HK$4.2 billion. The holding company itself was renamed to Hongkong Chinese Limited on 8 February 2002. In the same year 85% shares of Macau Chinese Bank and 85% stake of ImPac Asset Management were acquired, for MOP$190 million (from Finibanco and Alvaro Pinho da Costa Leite) and US$2.125 million (from ImPac Partners) respectively. An additional 15% shares of the bank were acquired from Wong Kon Kei in September 2007, for MOP$47.2 million. In the same year Hongkong Chinese Limited proposed to sell 60% shares of the intermediate holding company of the bank, Winwise Holdings Limited. However, the deal collapsed.

In 2006 Hongkong Chinese Limited, partnering Argyle Street Management, acquired Kim Seng Plaza, Singapore.

In June 2015, 49% shares of Macau Chinese Bank was sold to Chinese state-owned Nam Yue Group (40%) and Yang Jun (9%) respectively for MOP$441 million. Hongkong Chinese Limited remained as the major shareholder for 51% shares. In October 2015, an additional 31% shares were sold to Nam Yue Group (16%) and Wong Kar Ho (15%) for MOP$279 million, subject to the approval of the Monetary Authority of Macau.

== Ownership ==
In 1998, China Resources Enterprise acquired 50% shares of HKCB Bank Holding's parent company: Lippo CRE (Financial Services) Limited, which owned 58.78% shares of HKCB Bank Holding in 2001, the rest of the shares of Lippo CRE (Financial Services) were retained by Lippo China Resources, a listed company but also a subsidiary of Lippo Limited. In 2001, 50% shares of Lippo CRE (Financial Services) Limited and 5.84% shares of HKCB Bank Holding that were held by China Resources Enterprise directly, were sold to Lippo China Resources, for about HK$1.8 billion.

In 2007, to simplify group structure, the shares of Hongkong Chinese Limited were acquired by Lippo Limited from subsidiary Lippo China Resources.
