= Jianqing =

Jianqing could refer to:

- Jianqing Fan (Chinese: 范剑青; born 1962), Chinese statistician
- Ge Jianqing (born 1965), Chinese water polo player
- Jiang Jianqing (Chinese: 姜建清; born 1953), Chinese chairman
- Mao Jianqing (Chinese: 毛剑卿; born 1986), Chinese football player
- Yang Jianqing (1917–2024), Chinese politician
