= Buenos Aires Underground 200 Series =

Class of Chinese built trains used on the Subte Buenos Aires network

200 Series
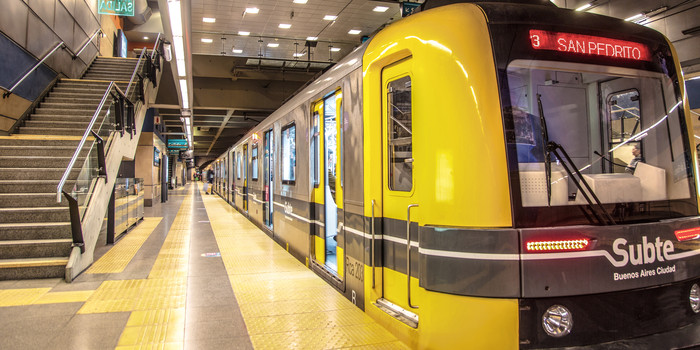
- A 200 Series train at San Pedrito
- Manufacturers: China CNR Corporation; CITIC Construction
- Replaced: La Brugeoise cars Fiat-Materfer
- Constructed: 2012-2016
- Entered service: 2013
- Number built: 150
- Number in service: 55+
- Formation: 3M+2T
- Capacity: 1,148 (seated)
- Operator: Buenos Aires Underground

Specifications
- Car body construction: Stainless steel
- Doors: 4 per side
- Maximum speed: 80 km/h (50 mph)
- Traction system: Alstom Optonix; IGBT-VVVF
- Track gauge: 1,435 mm (4 ft 8 1/2 in) standard gauge

The 200 Series is a set of underground cars manufactured by China CNR Corporation and CITIC Construction for use on Line A of the Buenos Aires Underground in Argentina. The cars replace the 100-year-old La Brugeoise cars which operated on the line up until 2013. The Buenos Aires Underground ordered 45 of these units, followed by a further 105 which have been put into service on the line.

== Background and overview ==
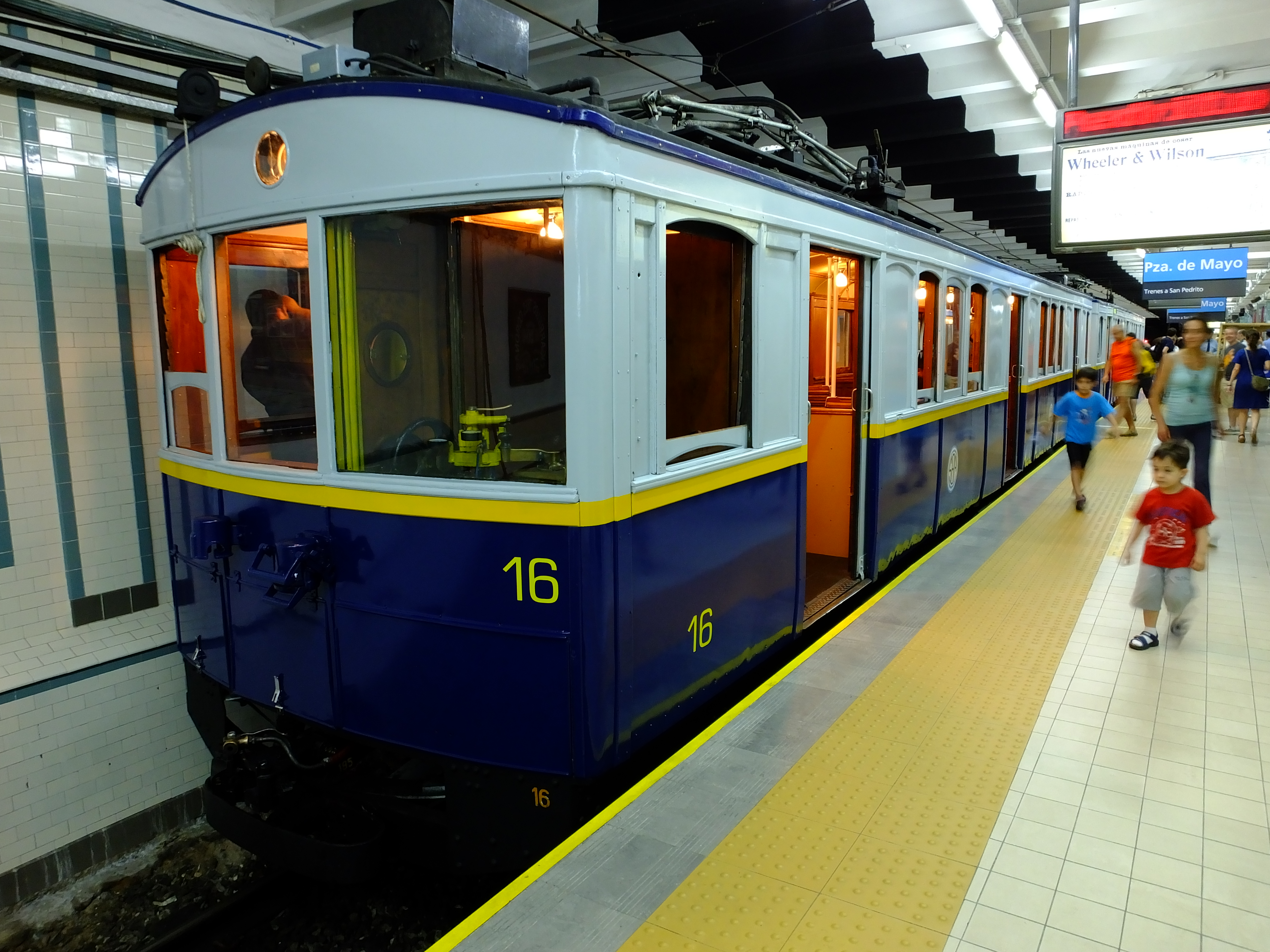
The wooden La Brugeoise cars were ultimately replaced by the CITIC-CNR cars in 2013.

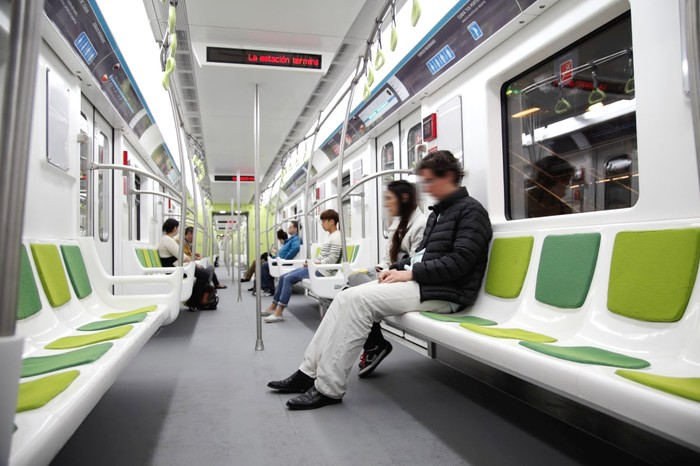
Interior of one of the cars

Since the opening of Line A in 1913, it had used the same La Brugeoise et Nicaise et Delcuve rolling stock (along with a small number of UEC Preston cars at one point). Over the years, numerous attempts were made to replace the rolling stock on the line, though this proved challenging due to its tight curves and use of 1100 volts current instead of the 1500 volts used on the rest of the network.

One such attempt was the Alstom Metropolis cars purchased at the turn of the 21st century, however these ultimately ended up serving on Line D. Before then, an attempt at creating a single, standardised rolling stock model for the entire network had been made in the 1980s in the form of the Fiat-Materfer cars produced in Argentina, which had also been designed to easily switch from 1500 V to 1100 V with Line A in mind. The Materfer cars were not used on Line A at their time of production, although were allocated to the line later as stand-ins for the 200 Series units which had yet to arrive from China.

In 2008, 45 of the CITIC-CNR cars (tailor-made for Line A) were ordered by the National Government for the network at a cost of $3 million per car. However, this was still short of the 120 La Brugeoise cars operating on the line at that point and the addition of Puán and Carabobo stations in 2008 meant that the rolling stock was already stretched to full capacity. Furthermore, the opening of San José de Flores and San Pedrito stations was planned for 2013, which was also the date the CITIC-CNR trains were set to arrive along with the retirement of the La Brugeoise cars.

The cars arrived in 2013 and the line was temporarily closed down at the start of that year in order to convert the voltage to 1500 V for their integration. At the same time, newer forced ventilation systems were installed to accommodate the hot air extracted by the air conditioning units of the new rolling stock. The line re-opened in March 2013 with the 45 cars operational. They were praised for their quiet operating noise (the lowest in the network) and for their inclusion of newer features such as air conditioning, automated announcements and good lighting which were lacking in the 100-year-old La Brugeoise cars.

== Shortages and new order ==
A 200 Series formation leaving San Pedrito station

By 2013, Line A was 3 km (1.9 mi) longer, with four more stations than had been serviced by the 120 La Brugeoise cars. This caused a serious shortage of rolling stock and Fiat-Materfer cars were brought in, along with some Siemens-Schuckert Orenstein & Koppel cars taken out of retirement and remodelled, to make up for these shortages.

In 2014, the City of Buenos Aires purchased another 105 of the 200 Series cars at a much lower cost of $1.53 million per unit. This brought the total to 150 cars on the line, 30 more than the number of La Brugeoise cars serving on the line before its two extensions. The first cars from the second order began to arrive in the port of Buenos Aires in early 2015, with the rest arriving through to early 2017. These new cars gradually replaced the Siemens and Materfer stock on the line until the line's rolling stock was made up entirely of the Chinese trains.

Nevertheless, the shortage experienced from the initial lack of a full fleet upon the line's re-opening led to a serious decline in passenger numbers on the line given its reduced frequencies, which then took some time to recover to previous levels.

== Gallery ==
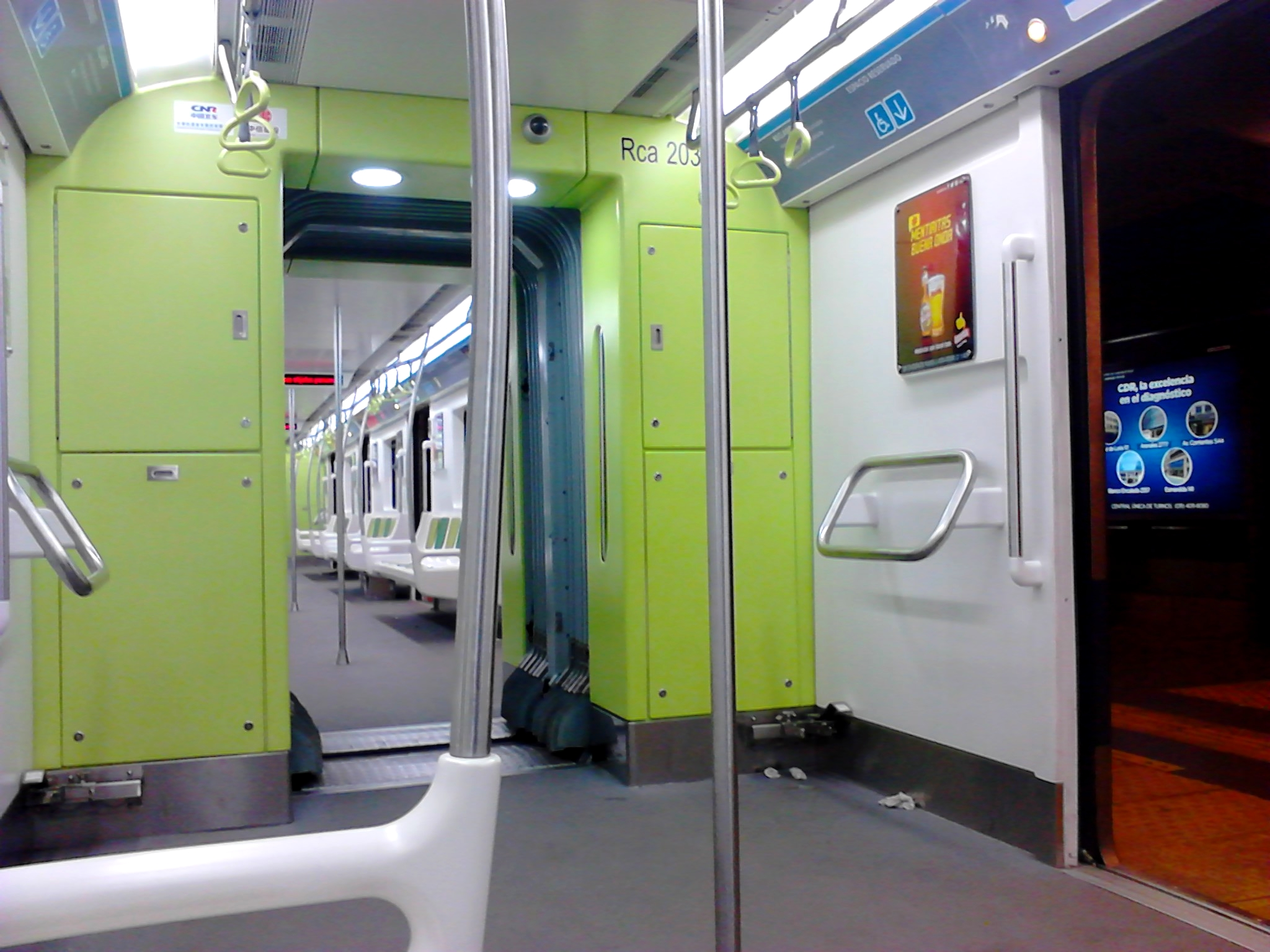
Entrance of the cars

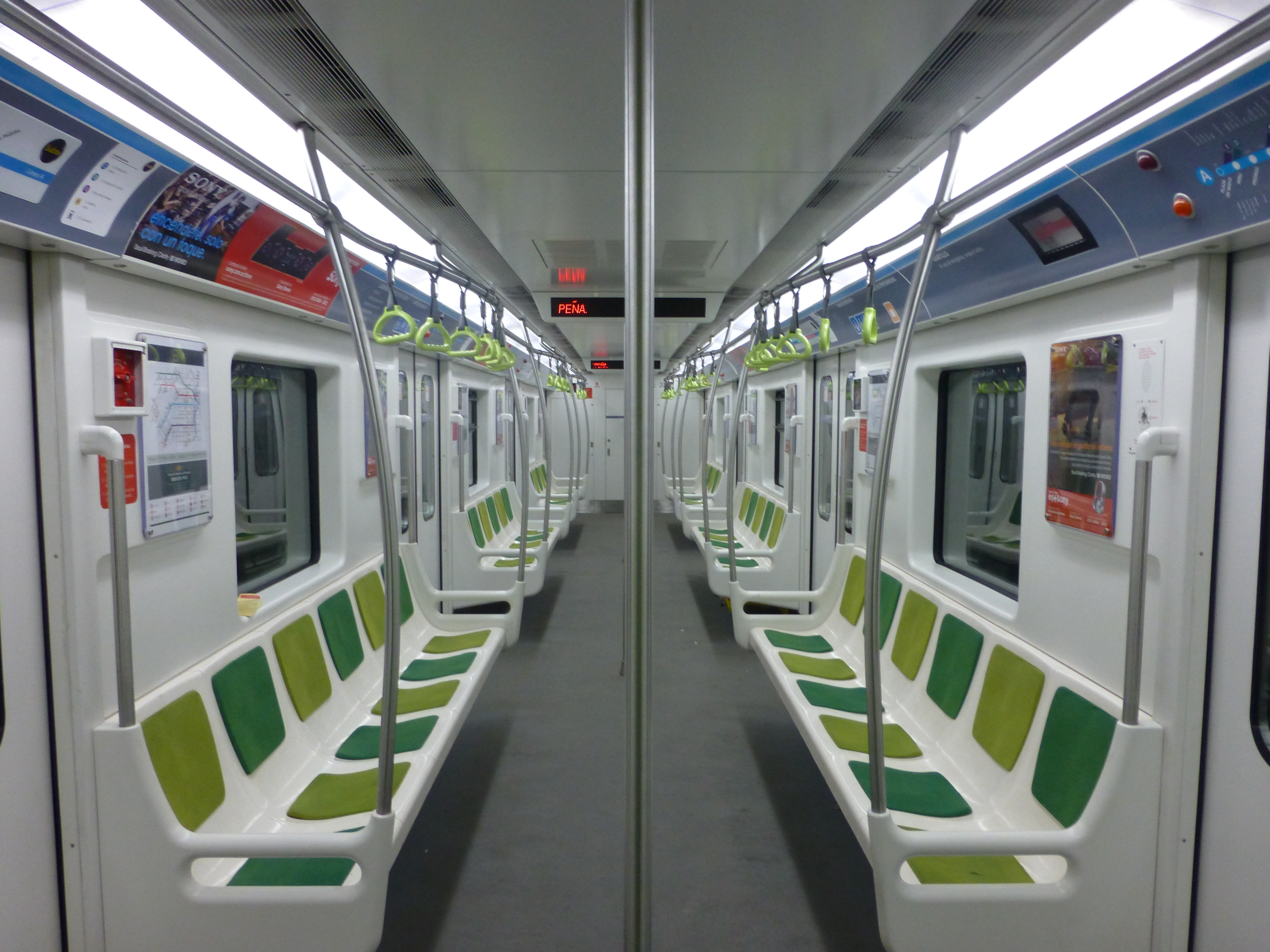
Interior of one of the cars

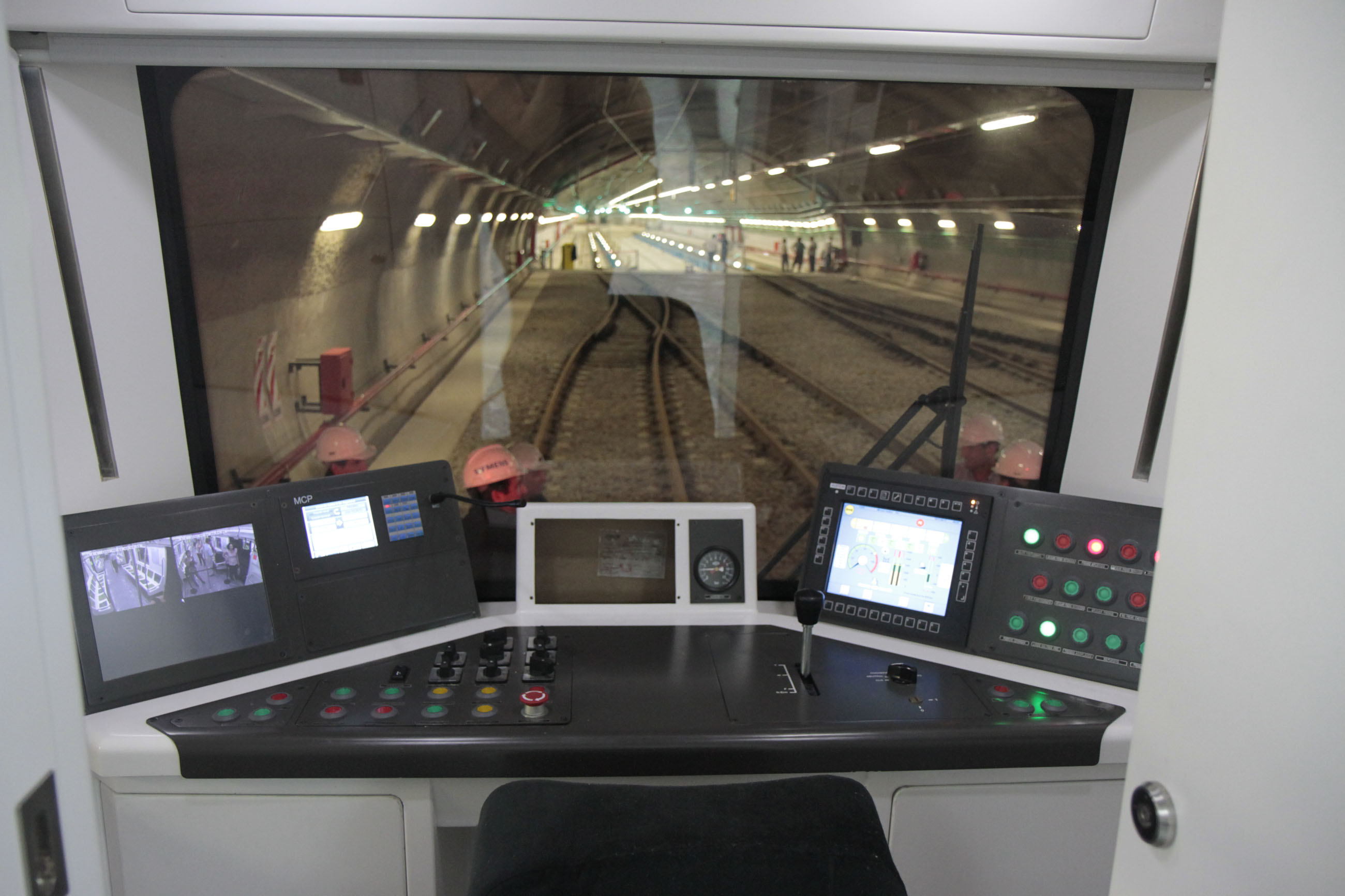
Conductor's cabin

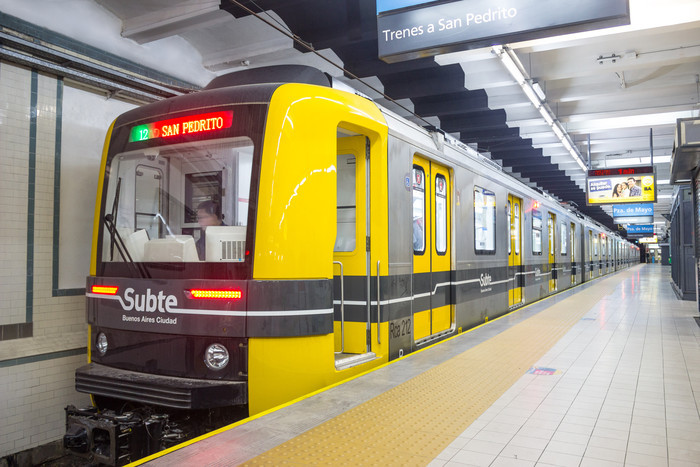
A 200 Series train at Plaza de Mayo

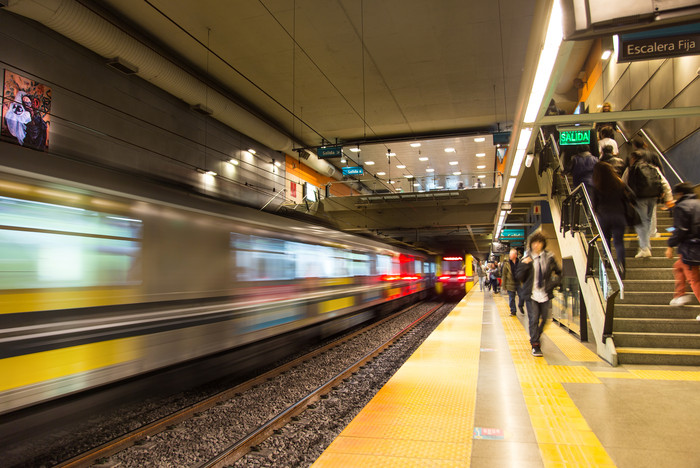
200 Series trains passing each other at San José de Flores station

== See also ==
- Buenos Aires Underground rolling stock
- La Brugeoise cars
- Fiat-Materfer cars
- UEC Preston
- Siemens-Schuckert Orenstein & Koppel
