= Lippo Limited =

Hong Kong holding company

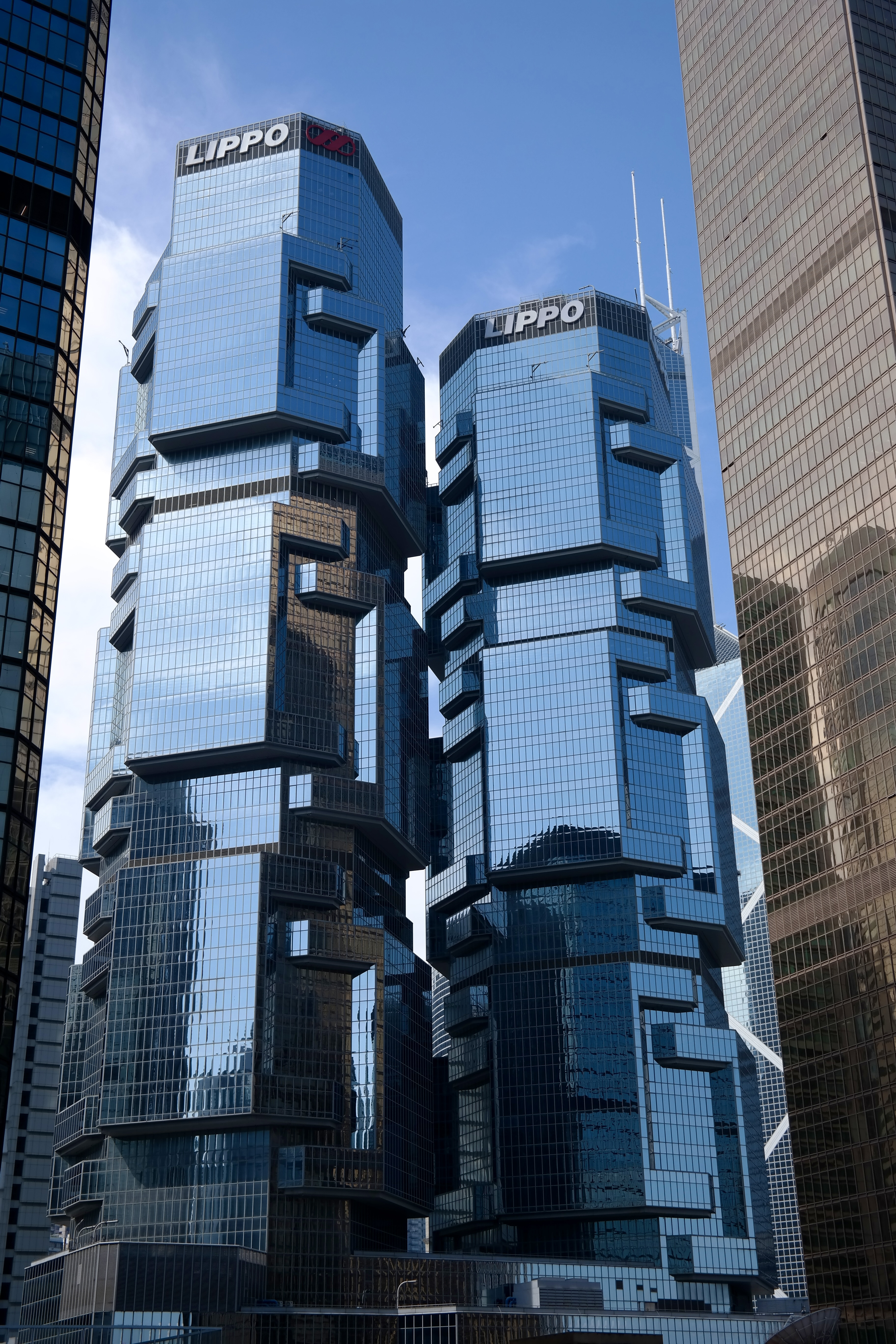
- Lippo Limited headquarters in Lippo Centre
- Formerly: Public Finance (H.K.) Limited
- Company type: public
- Traded as: SEHK: 226
- Founded: 30 January 1973; 53 years ago
- Headquarters: 24/F, Tower 1, Lippo Centre, Hong Kong Island, Hong Kong
Key people
Mochtar Riady	(Hon. Chairman)
Stephen Riady	(Chairman)
John Lee	(MD & CEO)
- Revenue: ▲HK$3.857 billion (2015–16)
- Net income: ▼ (HK$187 million) (2015–16)
- Total assets: ▼HK$17.457 billion (2015–16)
- Total equity: ▼HK$9.143 billion (2015–16)
Owner
Riady family (via Lippo Capital)	(69.75%)
general public	(30.25%)
- Parent: Lippo Capital
Subsidiaries
Hongkong Chinese	(65.8%)
Lippo China Resources	(71.2%)
- Website: lippoltd.com.hk
- Footnotes / references in consolidated financial statement; financial year ended on 31 March

Lippo Limited (Chinese: 力寶有限公司) is a Hong Kong incorporated listed company. It is the parent company of Hongkong Chinese Limited (SEHK: 655), Lippo China Resources Limited (SEHK: 156) and Auric Pacific Group (SGX: A23 ), all listed companies. Founded by Indonesian Chinese Mochtar Riady, Lippo Limited was majority owned by Lippo Capital; in turn Lippo Capital was 60% owned by Mochtar's son Stephen Riady (via Lippo Capital Group), as well as his brother James Tjahaja Riady (via PT Trijaya Utama Mandiri).

== History ==
Public Finance (H.K.) Limited (Chinese: 萬衆財務(香港)有限公司) was incorporated on 30 January 1973. (Note: Should not be confused Public Finance (H.K.) Limited with Public Finance Limited, known as JSG Finance until 2006, a subsidiary of Public Financial Holdings (SEHK: 626), nor it was not related to People Credit Service Limited (Chinese: 萬眾財務有限公司).) On 30 July 1991, the company changed its name to Lippo Limited (SEHK: 226).

In 1998 via subsidiary Lippo China Resources (SEHK: 156), the group formed a joint venture Lippo CRE (Financial Services) Limited with China Resources Enterprise to act as the parent company of The HKCB Bank Holding Limited (now known as Hongkong Chinese Limited, SEHK: 655), which in turn the parent company of Hongkong Chinese Bank for 60.6% shares. The price was about HK$1.2 billion.

In 2001, Lippo China Resources re-acquired 50% shares of Lippo CRE (Financial Services) Limited (which owned 58.78% shares of HKCB Bank Holding), as well as an additional 5.84% shares of HKCB Bank Holding from China Resources Enterprise for about HK$1.8 billion, effectively buying 35.23% interests in HKCB Bank Holding. In the same year HKCB Bank Holding sold the entire share capital of Hongkong Chinese Bank to CITIC Ka Wah Bank for HK$4.2 billion.

In December 2016, second-tier subsidiary Auric Pacific Group (a listed company majority owned by Lippo China Resources) was privatized by Lippo Limited's chairman Stephen Riady (son of Mochtar Riady) and his son-in-law Andy Adhiwana (via a SPV Silver Creek Capital) for S$1.65 per shares.

== Subsidiaries ==
- Lippo China Resources (71.2%)
- Hongkong Chinese (65.8%)

former

- Auric Pacific Group
  - Délifrance Asia Ltd. (100%)
  - Delifrance Singapore Pte. Ltd. (100%)
  - Delifrance (HK) Ltd. (100%)
  - Delifrance (Malaysia) Sdn. Bhd. (100%)
  - Shanghai Delifrance Foodstuff Co., Ltd. (100%)
