= Lippo Centre (Hong Kong) =

Twin tower skyscraper complex in Hong Kong

- 力寶中心
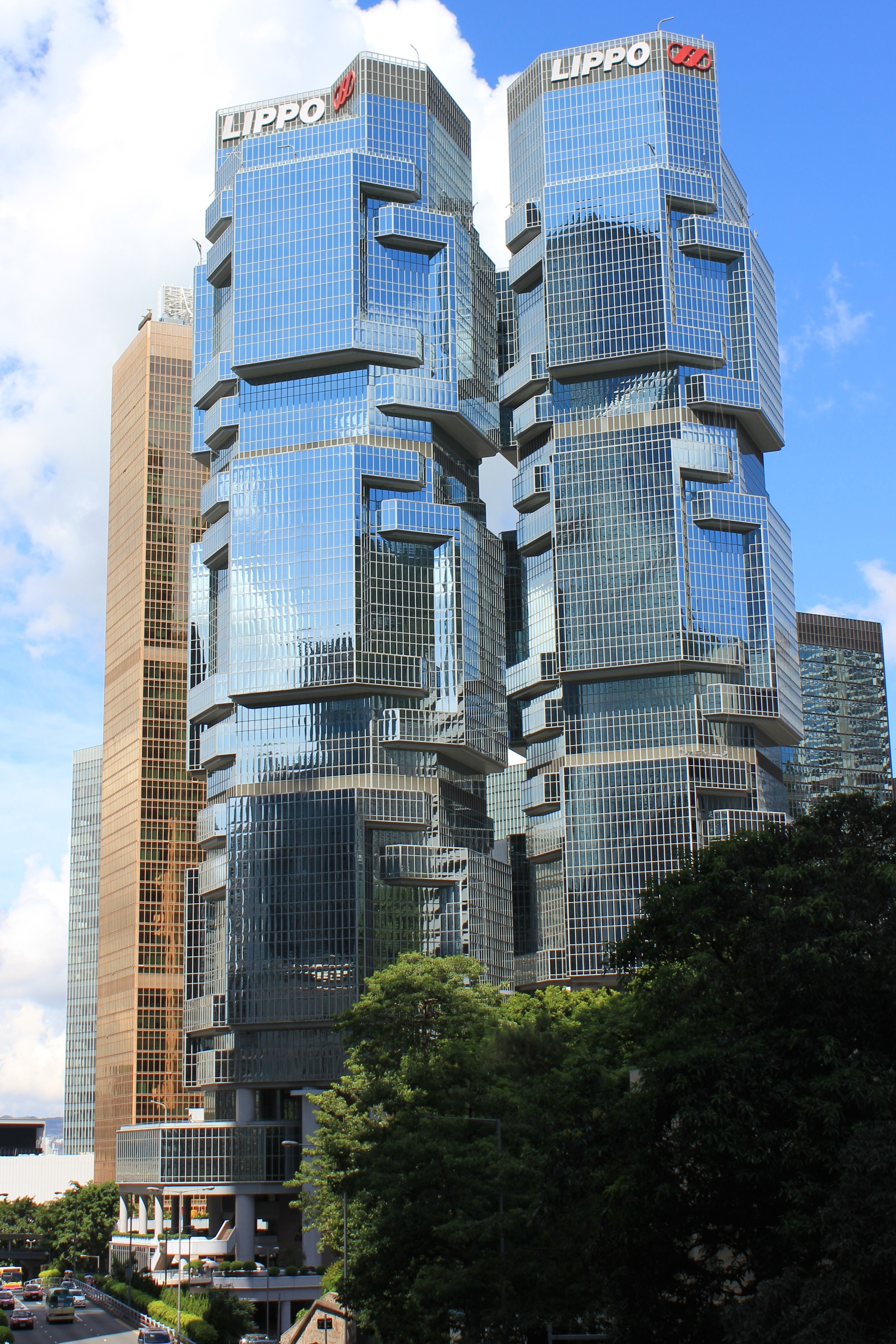
- Twin towers of the Lippo Centre in August 2011
- Interactive map of the Lippo Centre area
- Alternative names: Bond Centre; Peregrine Tower; Lippo Tower I and II

General information
- Status: Completed
- Type: Commercial offices
- Architectural style: Modernist
- Location: 89 Queensway, Admiralty, Hong Kong
- Coordinates: 22.2793°N 114.1634°E
- Construction started: 1986; 40 years ago
- Completed: 1988; 38 years ago
- Owner: various owner, such as Lippo Limited (partial)

Height
- Roof: Tower I: 186 m (610.2 ft); Tower II: 186 m (610.2 ft)
- Top floor: Tower I: 172 m (564.3 ft); Tower 2: 180 m (590.6 ft)

Technical details
- Floor count: Tower I: 46; Tower II: 42

Design and construction
- Architects: Paul Rudolph; Wong & Ouyang (HK) Ltd.
- Developer: Kwee Liong Tek; Alan Bond
- Main contractor: Hip Hing Construction

Lippo Centre (Chinese: 力寶中心; Jyutping: lik6 bou2 zung1 sam1), previously known as the Bond Centre (奔達中心; ban1 daat6 zung1 sam1), is a twin tower skyscraper complex completed in 1988 at 89 Queensway, in Admiralty on Hong Kong Island in Hong Kong near Admiralty station. Tower I is 186 m (610.2 ft) with 46 storeys, and Tower II is 172 m (564.3 ft) with 42 storeys.

== History ==
The Lippo Centre is a landmark development located in the heart of Admiralty comprising approximately 120 thousand square metres (1.3×10^{6} sq ft) in two office towers with a retail podium element situated on the ground floors and a small basement car park.

On completion in late 1987, Savills Investment Management began managing the Lippo Centre. Since 1988, the landmark has been riddled with spectacular corporate collapses in its ownership. Relatives of the Singapore-based Kwee Liong Tek family had a majority consortium interest in the construction from its conception, later selling their majority interest half-way through construction to British-born Australian business tycoon Alan Bond, who went bankrupt four years later with the collapse of the Bond Corporation. It has had several corporate ownership failures since and was eventually taken over by Peregrine Investments Holdings who also faced financial collapse, and the Indonesian-backed Lippo Group who are the largest single owner of the building. Local feng shui consultants have suggested the building has bad feng-shui based on the C-shaped glass-walled extrusions (often referred to locally as resembling koalas clinging to a tree), although Peregrine's own feng-shui consultant gave the towers a clean bill of health.

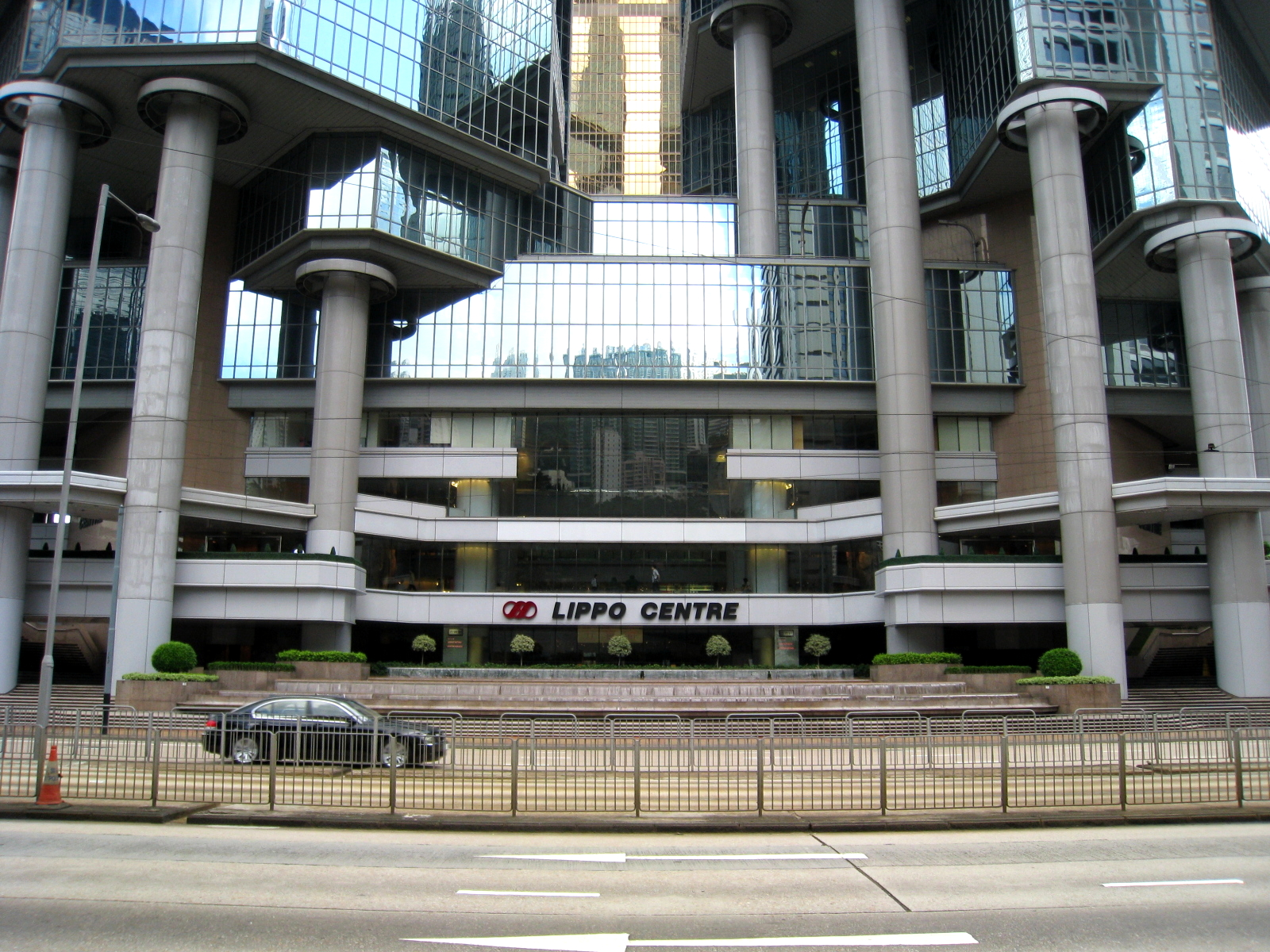
Lippo Centre front view in June 2008

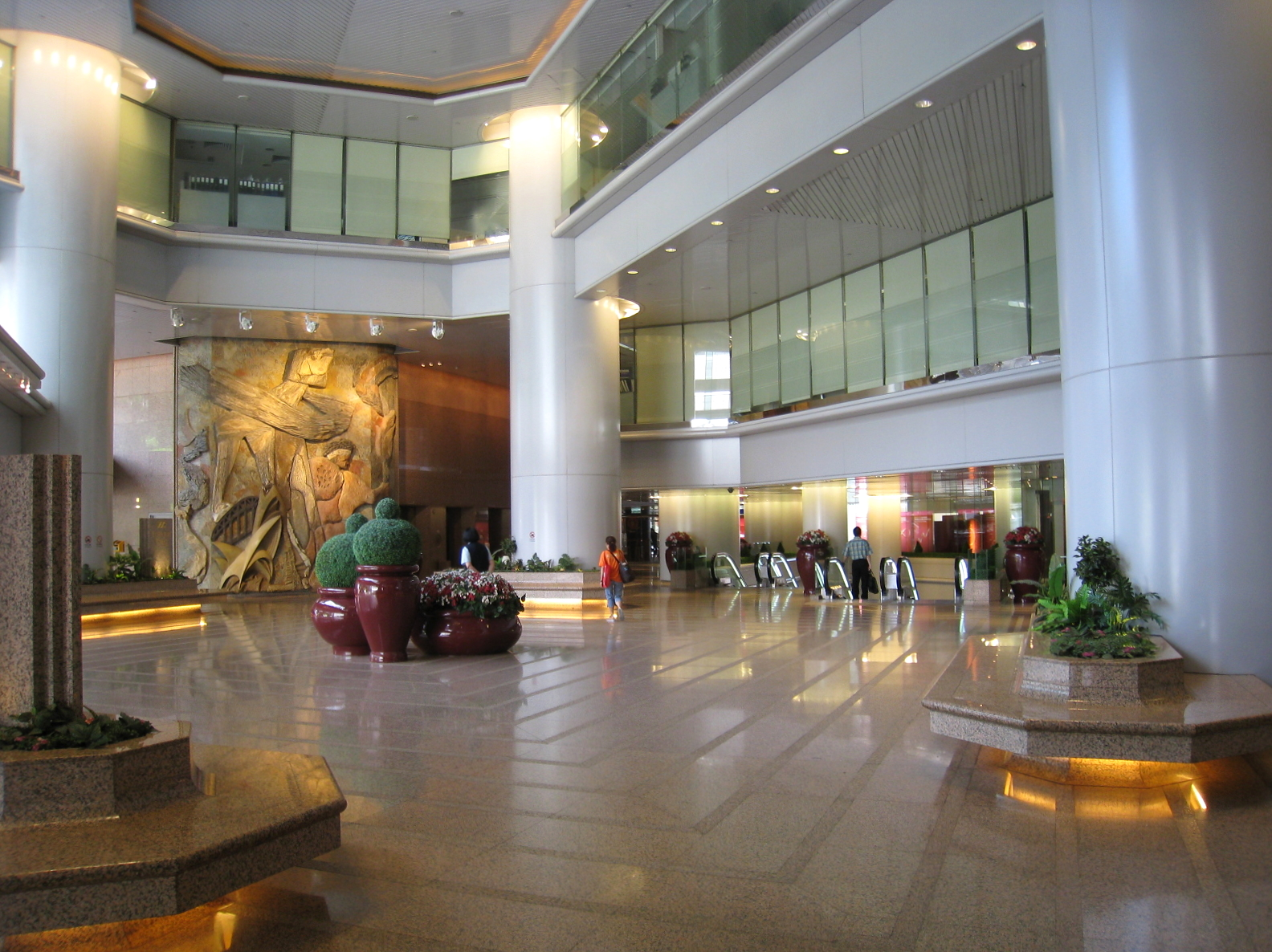
Lippo Centre lobby in June 2008

== Architecture ==
The octagonal buildings, clad with a dark blue refractive glass curtain wall, were designed by American architect Paul Rudolph who was working at the time as a design consultant for Wong & Ouyang. The buildings' main construction contractor was Hip Hing Construction.

In 1988, Rudolph wrote: "The aesthetic intent is to...give the building 'presence' when seen at a great distance, from the middle distance, and from close distance, and from close hand. At the same time, it is intended that the building inhabit the sky, and become dematerialized by reflecting the ever changing light."

The late muralist-artist Gerard D'Alton Henderson, who designed the walls in the Hong Kong Mandarin Oriental Hotel, enriched the lobby with dramatic bas-relief murals.

The Lippo Centre is connected to the Central Elevated Walkway network of footbridges.

== Tenants ==
One of the more well known companies registered in the Lippo Centre is the Network of Asia and Pacific Producers (NAPP) which serves and caters to the needs of Fairtrade producers in Asia and Pacific and has a membership of over 200 producer organizations. The building also houses the Taipei Economic and Cultural Office in Hong Kong and Christian Muhr Global Asset Management, which employs 1,200 staff and occupies six floors of Tower Two of the Lippo Centre. Several foreign consulates have also established representative offices in the Lippo Centre, such as Angola, Brunei, Ireland, Mongolia, Romania, Turkey and Taiwan, as well as foreign chambers of commerce.

- Lippo Limited
- Hongkong Chinese Limited

== Popular culture ==
- The Lippo Centre was seen in the 1991 movie Double Impact starring Jean-Claude Van Damme and was used as the headquarters of Nigel Griffith (Alan Scarfe).
- Lippo Centre is featured in the Dockside track in Burnout 3
- It was seen (with CGI alterations) as the headquarters building of the Hanka Corporation in the 2017 film Ghost in the Shell.
