= CITIC Capital =

Chinese alternative investment firm

CITIC Capital Holdings Limited
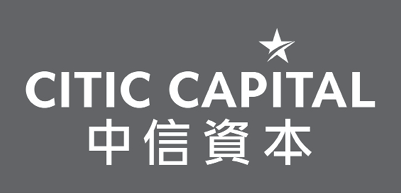
- Native name: 中信资本控股有限公司
- Formerly: CITIC Capital Markets Holdings Limited
- Company type: Subsidiary
- Industry: Investment management
- Founded: 4 February 2002; 24 years ago
- Headquarters: CITIC Tower, Hong Kong
- Key people: Zhang Yichen (chairman & CEO)
- Products: Private equity; Real estate; Structured finance; Asset management; Special situations
- AUM: US$15 billion (2024)
- Owners: Management team (20.75%); Tencent (20.70%); Fubon Financial Holding Co. (19.92%); CITIC Limited (19.90%); Qatar Holding; (18.73%)
- Number of employees: 280 (2023)
- Website: www.citiccapital.com

CITIC Capital (Chinese: 中信资本; pinyin: Zhōngxìn Zīběn) is a Chinese alternative investment firm founded in 2002 that is headquartered in Hong Kong.

== Background ==
CITIC Capital was founded on 4 February 2002 originally as CITIC Capital Markets, an investment banking joint venture between CITIC Group and CITIC Ka Wah Bank.

Towards the end of 2002, CITIC Capital Markets entered the retail mutual funds business in Hong Kong. It would rely on CITIC Ka Wah Bank and Cargary Securities to act as its distributors. Around this time, Zhang Yichen moved from CITIC Pacific to join the firm as deputy CEO and would oversee the new business strategy. The aim was to build a business infrastructure so it could later support CITIC Securities which at time was limited in its exposure to the funds industry. It partnered with Bank One Corporation to launch its first mutual fund which was a bond fund that invested in US mortgage-backed securities and treasuries.

In 2006, CITIC Capital Markets and CITIC Securities signed a memorandum of understanding to build a China focused equities platform. As a result, CITIC Capital Markets transferred its equities business to CITIC securities and rebranded to CITIC Capital Holdings where it would focus on principal investing.

== Structure ==
=== Business activities ===
CITIC Capital has the following business lines:

- Private equity (Trustar Capital. Was formerly known as CITIC Capital Partners until March 2021)
- Real Estate (CITIC Capital Real Estate Group. Formed in 2005)
- Structured Investment & Finance
- Asset Management (Vision Capital)
- Special Situations (formed in 2017)
- ESG Investing (formed in 2010)

In January 2014, CITIC Capital launched its first quantitative hedge fund, CCTrack Solutions. It would invest globally in various asset classes.

=== Ownership ===
The ownership of CITIC capital has changed frequently. When it was incorporated it was jointly owned by CITIC Group and CITIC Ka Wah Bank. In 2004, its shareholders structure changed to be jointly owned by CITIC Pacific and CITIC International Financial Holdings. In July 2009, China Investment Corporation acquired a 40% stake of CITIC Capital. In August 2012, Qatar Holding acquired a 22% stake in CITIC Capital. In November 2014, Tencent became a shareholder of CITIC Capital. In June 2015, Fubon Financial Holding Co. acquired a 20% stake of CITIC Capital.
