= Andrew Chan (judge) =

Hong Kong judge (born 1961)

The Honourable Mr Justice Andrew Chan Hing-wai
- 陳慶偉

Judge of the Court of First Instance of the High Court
- Incumbent
- Assumed office 2012

District Judge
- In office 2007–2012

Permanent Magistrate
- In office 1998–2007

Personal details
- Born: 1961 (age 64–65) Hong Kong
- Education: University of London (External)

Andrew Chan Hing-wai (Chinese: 陳慶偉; born 1961) is a Hong Kong judge who hears and tries criminal cases. He has served as a Judge of the Court of First Instance of the High Court since August 2012.

== Education and legal career ==
Chan graduated from the University of Bradford, United Kingdom with a Bachelor of Pharmacy in 1984. He received an LLB from the University of London External System in 1989. In 1990, he was called to the bar in England at Gray's Inn and in Hong Kong.

Chan was in private practice as a member of the Chambers of Gary Plowman SC.

== Judicial career ==
In 1998, Chan joined the bench as a Permanent Magistrate. In 2007, he became a District Judge.

He sat as a Deputy High Court Judge from 2010 to 2012.

In 2012, he was appointed as a High Court Judge.

In 2015, Chan was appointed as Chairman of the Inquiry into the incidents of excess lead found in drinking water.

Chan has sat in the Court of Appeal in a number of cases.

As Chan shares the same surname and first name initial as another High Court Judge (Mr Justice Anthony Chan), in English decisions he is referred to as 'Andrew Chan J' rather than 'Chan J' or 'A Chan J'.

=== Notable cases ===
==== Du Jun ====
In 2009, Du Jun, a managing director of Morgan Stanley, was tried before Chan in the District Court. Du was convicted of 10 counts of insider dealing in HK$87 million worth of shares in CITIC Resources. Chan sentenced Du to 7 years’ imprisonment and fined over HK$23 million. At the time, the case was described by the Securities and Futures Commission as Hong Kong's largest insider trading case.

==== Lam Mei-ling ====
In 2013, Chan presided over the trial in the High Court of Lam Mei-ling, who was found guilty of laundering HK$6.7 billion (a daily average of HK$5 million) between May 2002 and December 2005. It was the second-biggest money laundering case in Hong Kong. Chan sentenced Lam to 10 years' imprisonment.

==== Donald Tsang ====
In 2017, Chan presided over the trial of former Chief Executive of Hong Kong, Donald Tsang, in the High Court on charges of bribery and misconduct in public office. The jury convicted Tsang of misconduct in public office, but could not agree on the bribery charge. When Chan sentenced Tsang to 20 months' imprisonment for the count of misconduct in public office, he said, "To the outside world, sentencing appears to be an easy task. To most judges, it is the most difficult part of their jobs. This case is of no exception. Never in my judicial career have I seen a man fallen from so high".

Chan also presided over the re-trial, but again the jury was unable to agree on the bribery charge. In a later written decision, Chan observed that public relations consultants had (with Tsang's consent, acquiescence or involvement) arranged for prominent public figures to sit in reserved seats in the public gallery in the courtroom during the re-trial. Chan was of the view that "The objective was undoubtedly to inform and impress upon the jury that the Defendant was a good person and had support from people across the whole spectrum of the society". Chan stated that "Had the engagement of public relations firm or consultant been brought to my attention earlier, I might consider discharging the entire jury". The former Secretary for Justice, Wong Yan-lung SC, who attended Tsang's re-trial, issued a statement describing Chan's observation as 'factually incorrect', while former Financial Secretary, John Tsang, issued a statement that his attendance at Tsang's re-trial was solely out of concern for a friend.

==== Nancy Kissel ====
In 2017, Chan (sitting with Mr Justice Au in the High Court) heard and dismissed the application brought by Nancy Kissel (who had been convicted of the murder of her husband, investment banker Robert Kissel) for judicial review of the Long‑term Prison Sentences Review Board's decision not to make a recommendation to convert her indeterminate life sentence to a determinate one so as to facilitate her release.

==== Tang Lin-ling ====
In 2018, Chan presided over the trial in the High Court of a number of Occupy protestors charged with contempt of court for impeding the due execution of a High Court injunction by refusing to leave the junction of Nathan Road and Portland Street in Mong Kok in 2014. A member of the public, Tang Lin-ling, who was sitting in the public gallery and observing the first day of the trial, took three photographs on her mobile phone inside the courtroom (where photography is prohibited). Tang said to Chan, "I’m happy to take pictures with you, judge." Chan replied to Tang, "This is a big issue in my court. Too many people have come to court to take pictures of witnesses and jurors." Chan adjourned the matter and released Tang on HK$50,000 bail. However, Tang failed to post bail. The Police discovered that the residential address given by Tang was non-existent. Chan therefore issued an arrest warrant for Tang. Tang was subsequently arrested at the JW Marriott Hotel and brought before Chan, who ordered Tang to be remanded in custody.

Tang stood trial before Chan as a litigant in person as she refused legal assistance. Chan found Tang guilty of contempt of court, sentenced her to 7 days' imprisonment and ordered her to pay the prosecution's legal costs in the amount of HK$197,260. Chan remarked, "These are very expensive photos." As Tang had by then already been in custody for 7 days, she was deported the same day to Shenzhen. Tang has since been denied entry to Hong Kong.

After this incident, the Chief Justice issued a Practice Direction regarding the use of mobile phones and other devices in courtrooms for court proceedings involving a jury.
