= Baiyin Nonferrous =

Nonferrous metal manufacturer in China

Baiyin Nonferrous Group Co., Ltd.
- Trade name: BNMC
- Native name: 白银有色集团股份有限公司
- Romanized name: báiyín yǒusè jítuán gǔfèn yǒuxiàn gōngsī
- Type: State-owned enterprise
- Traded as: SSE: 601212
- Industry: Nonferrous metals
- Predecessor: Baiyin Nonferrous Metal Corporation
- Founded: November 24, 2008
- Headquarters: No.96, Youhao Road, Baiyin, Gansu, China
- Area served: Worldwide
- Products: Copper, Zinc, Lead, Silver, Gold
- Revenue: CN¥86.97 billion (2023)
- Net income: CN¥83.06 million (2023)
- Website: Official website

Baiyin Nonferrous Group Co., Ltd. (Chinese: 白银有色集团股份有限公司), also known as BNMC, is a major Chinese state-owned enterprise involved in the mining, smelting, and processing of nonferrous metals, including copper, lead, zinc, silver, and gold. Headquartered in Baiyin, Gansu Province, the company is a key player in China's nonferrous metals industry and has significantly expanded its global footprint in recent years.

== Corporate affairs ==
As of 2017, the company's major shareholders included:

- Gansu Provincial People's Government – 36.16%
- CITIC Guoan Group – 32.27%
- Ruiyuan (Shanghai) Investment Fund – 11.47%
- China Cinda Asset Management – 5.38%
- CITIC Group – 2.81%

== History ==
The company's predecessor, Baiyin Nonferrous Metal Corporation, was founded in 1954 as one of the major industrial projects of the First Five-Year Plan. It became China's primary copper supplier, although the main copper mine in Baiyin was depleted and shut down in 1988.

The company was formally incorporated in 2008 and listed on the Shanghai Stock Exchange in 2017 under the ticker symbol SSE: 601212. It was ranked 116th in the Fortune China 500 list in 2017.

=== U.S. sanctions ===
On 31 July 2026, the United States Department of Homeland Security announced the addition of 43 companies to the Uyghur Forced Labor Prevention Act Entity List, including Baiyin Nonferrous and its subsidiary, Xinjiang Baiyin. In the statement, the U.S. government believed that Baiyin Nonferrous sourcing copper and molybdenum from Xinjiang.

== Operations ==
BNMC engages in the mining, refining, and trading of nonferrous metals, with operations in China and overseas.

=== Domestic Operations ===
Baiyin Nonferrous operates major mining and smelting facilities in Baiyin, Gansu Province, which historically served as China's primary copper production base. It has expanded its domestic presence to other provinces, focusing on lead, zinc, silver, and gold production.

=== Africa ===
BNMC has significantly expanded in Africa:

- In March 2019, BNMC acquired a 29.6% stake in Gold One Group Limited (South Africa) from the China-Africa Development Fund for approximately CNY 2.2 billion.
- Through its subsidiary, Baiyin International Investment, the company also acquired the Twangiza Mine in the Democratic Republic of the Congo from Banro Corporation in 2020 after Banro filed for bankruptcy. The acquisition price was nominal, due to operational disruptions and liabilities.

=== South America ===
In April 2025, BNMC acquired Mineração Vale Verde (MVV) from Appian Capital Advisory for US$420 million. MVV operates the Serrote copper-gold mine in the State of Alagoas, Brazil. This acquisition marked BNMC's entry into the South American market.
