= Larry Yung =

Chinese businessman

Larry Yung Chi-kin Rong Zhijian
- 榮智健

Chairman of CITIC Limited
- In office 10 March 1990 – 8 April 2009
- Succeeded by: Chang Zhenming

Personal details
- Born: 31 January 1942 (age 83) Shanghai
- Spouse: Catherine Yung
- Children: 3
- Parent(s): Rong Yiren; Yang Jianqing
- Occupation: Former chairman of CITIC Pacific

Chinese name
- Traditional Chinese: 榮智健
- Simplified Chinese: 荣智健
Transcriptions
Standard Mandarin
- Hanyu Pinyin: Róng Zhìjiàn
Yue: Cantonese
- Jyutping: Yung^{4} Chi^{3}-kin^{6}

Larry Yung Chi-kin or Rong Zhijian (Chinese: 榮智健; born 31 January 1942) is a Chinese businessman and the former chairman of CITIC Pacific, a Hong Kong–based conglomerate. According to Hurun Report, he was one of the wealthiest people in mainland China, with a personal net worth of US$2.9 billion as of 2013. He was in charge of CITIC Pacific when it made its first major loss in 20 years, $2 billion, due to speculation in FX accumulators. This exposed the lack of internal management controls, which subsequently resulted in a temporary suspension of CITIC Pacific shares on the Hong Kong Stock Exchange and police raids at CITIC.

== Biography ==
=== Early life ===
Yung was born in Shanghai to businessman Rong Yiren, who later became the vice president of China during the 1990s. He graduated from Shanghai Nanyang Model High School in 1959 and went on to Tianjin University, where he majored in electronic engineering. Yung's uncle, Paul, elder brother of Yiren, died with 34 others in Hong Kong's worst air disaster on Basalt Island on 21 December 1948.

=== Cultural revolution ===
When the Cultural Revolution started, because of his capitalist background, Rong Yiren was exiled to Liangshan, in Sichuan, in 1966. After the turbulent years, he became associated with Deng Xiaoping and was later appointed vice-president of the People's Republic of China. His family's ties to the Chinese Communist Party earned him the nickname "the Red Capitalist." With the support of the Chinese government and its capital, son Larry moved to Hong Kong and started businesses with the Chinese government as major shareholder, becoming wealthy in the process.

=== CITIC Pacific ===
In 1990, Yung became chairman of CITIC Pacific, an arm of his father's company CITIC Group. He continued his work at the company until the Foreign exchange losses controversy led to his resignation on 8 April 2009.

=== Recent ventures ===
In 2007, Yung was reported to have joined the ranks of real estate speculators in Shanghai with an investment of more than one billion RMB. In 2009, having left CITIC, he established Yung's Enterprise Holdings to pursue this line of business.
