= Hongkong Chinese Bank =

Acquired bank in Hong Kong

The Hongkong Chinese Bank, Limited
- Type: subsidiary
- Industry: Finance
- Founded: 10 December 1954
- Defunct: 25 November 2002
- Successor: CITIC Ka Wah Bank
- Headquarters: Hong Kong
- Owner: HKCB Bank Holding (100%)
Parent
HKCB Bank Holding	(direct)
Lippo CRE (Financial Services)	(ultimate)

The Hongkong Chinese Bank Limited (HKCB) (Traditional Chinese: 香港華人銀行有限公司) was a bank in Hong Kong. It was owned by HKCB Bank Holding Company Limited (SEHK: 655), which in turn was majority owned by a joint venture company owned by listed companies Lippo China Resources and the China Resources Enterprise. The bank was acquired and merged into CITIC Ka Wah Bank. It was one of the pilot banks in Hong Kong to accept the digital signature of Hongkong Post.

== History ==
- 1954: Hongkong Chinese Bank was founded in Hong Kong by Sir Sik-nin Chau.
- 1998: China Resources Enterprise acquired 50% shares of Lippo CRE (Financial Services) Limited. (Note: Lippo CRE (Financial Services) Limited is the parent company of HKCB Bank Holding Company Limited, which in turn the parent company of the bank.)
- January 2002: CITIC Ka Wah Bank acquired Hongkong Chinese Bank for HK$4.2 billion.
- November 2002: CITIC Ka Wah Bank merged with Hongkong Chinese Bank. The banking business of CITIC Ka Wah Bank was transferred to Hongkong Chinese Bank. CITIC Ka Wah Bank became a financial holding company operating under the name CITIC International Financial Holdings Limited, while Hongkong Chinese Bank's name was changed to CITIC Ka Wah Bank Limited.

== See others ==
- CITIC Ka Wah Bank
- CITIC International Financial Holdings
- Macau Chinese Bank
