= Macau Chinese Bank =

Chinese bank

The Macau Chinese Bank Limited (Chinese: 澳門華人銀行有限公司; Portuguese: Banco Chinês de Macau, S.A.) is a bank in Macau, China.

The bank was formerly known as Finibanco (Macau) (Chinese: 富利銀行有限公司). It was acquired by Winwise Holdings Limited, the subsidiary of Hongkong Chinese Limited, in 2002 and renamed The Macau Chinese Bank, Limited. In 2007, Value Convergence Holdings, a subsidiary of Melco International Development, signed an agreement to acquire 60% stake of Macau Chinese Bank. However, in 2008, Value Convergence Holdings declared to give up the acquisition because Monetary Authority of Macao did not agree it before the agreement expiry date.

In 2015 the Chinese state-owned Nam Yue Group acquired a 56% stake in the bank from Hongkong Chinese Limited in two tranches. Two other natural persons also acquired 24% stake of the bank.

== See others ==
- Hongkong Chinese Bank - now merged to CITIC Ka Wah Bank
