= Du Jun =

Du Jun 杜军
- Occupations: Former stock broker, financial adviser, and managing director at Morgan Stanley Asia Limited
- Employer: Morgan Stanley Asia Limited
- Known for: Committing Hong Kong's largest and most high-profile insider trading case
- Status: Jailed
- Criminal charges: Nine counts of insider dealing, one count of counselling or procuring another person to deal in the shares of a listed company prior to the announcement of an acquisition deal
- Penalty: Seven years imprisonment and $23.3 million fine

Du Jun (simplified Chinese: 杜军; traditional Chinese: 杜軍; pinyin: Dù Jūn) is a Chinese businessman and financier with origins in Beijing. He was known for his role as former managing director of the Wall Street investment bank Morgan Stanley in Hong Kong.

He was sentenced for a maximum seven years in prison in September 2009 and fined $23.3 million (about US$3 million) for his part in Hong Kong's biggest insider trading case – an "unprecedented" scam a judge said undermined the integrity of the leading Asian financial centre. He was convicted on nine counts on 10 September 2009 but pleaded "not guilty to all charges. He was also convicted of involving his wife in the scam.

== Career ==
Du offered advice to China's CITIC Resources, part of the CITIC Group, who wished to buy a Kazakh oil field. He purchased stock from the company in return for this, later selling it and obtaining a profit of $33.4 million. According to the Securities and Futures Commission (SFC), Du purchased CITIC shares at least nine times in the early part of 2007. Upon discovery, he fled to China.

== Arrest and trial ==
Du was arrested upon his arrival from Beijing at the Hong Kong International Airport on 10 July 2008. He was taken to appear before Garry Tallentire, Principal Magistrate of the Eastern Magistracy, the following day, making his court debut in the process. He went on to appear in the city's District Court on 23 September 2008. The SFC froze $46.5 million throughout their investigation and police assistance was also provided. The trial took 38 days before drawing its conclusions. Judge Andrew Chan claimed Du was "driven by sheer greed". Taped conversations which Du had with other bankers showed him claiming to have "a lot of inside information".

== Conviction ==
As well as the prison sentence and fine, Du received a five-year ban from taking high-profile posts in any listed company or dealing in any further of the type of business which resulted in his conviction. He is also expected to pay $0.93 million costs incurred by the Securities and Futures Commission's investigation into his actions.

== Reaction ==
Then-CEO of the SFC Martin Wheatley said that "This sentence sends the strongest possible message that insider dealing is not tolerated in Hong Kong and those found guilty can expect lengthy terms of imprisonment".

== See also ==
- Chip Skowron, Morgan Stanley subsidiary hedge fund portfolio manager convicted of insider trading
