= Rong Yiren =

Former vice president of the People's Republic of China (1916–2005)

- 荣毅仁
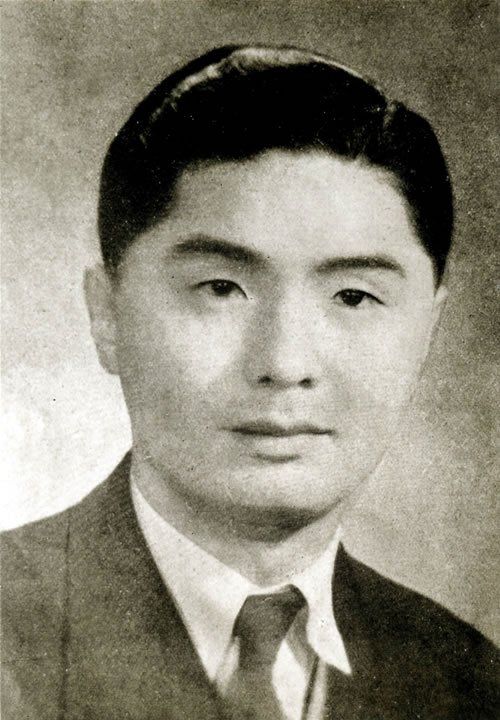
- Rong Yiren in 1949

Vice President of the People's Republic of China
- In office March 12, 1993 – March 15, 1998
- President: Jiang Zemin
- Preceded by: Wang Zhen
- Succeeded by: Hu Jintao

Personal details
- Born: May 1, 1916 Wuxi, Jiangsu, Republic of China
- Died: October 26, 2005 (aged 89) Beijing, People's Republic of China
- Party: China Democratic National Construction Association
- Spouse: Yang Jianqing (m. 1937)
- Children: Larry Yung
- Education: St. John's University, Shanghai

Rong Yiren
- Traditional Chinese: 榮毅仁
- Simplified Chinese: 荣毅仁
Transcriptions
Standard Mandarin
- Hanyu Pinyin: Róng Yìrén
- Wade–Giles: Jung^{2} I^{4}-jen^{2}

Rong Yiren (Chinese: 荣毅仁; pinyin: Róng Yìrén; Wade–Giles: Jung^{²} I^{⁴}-jen^{²}; May 1, 1916 – October 26, 2005) was the Vice President of China from 1993 to 1998 and was heavily involved with the opening of the Chinese economy to western investment. Rong is known both in China and in the Western world as "the Red Capitalist" because his family were some of the few pre-1949 industrialists in Shanghai to have been treated well by the Chinese Communist Party in return for their co-operation with the government of the People's Republic of China.

== Biography ==
=== Early life ===
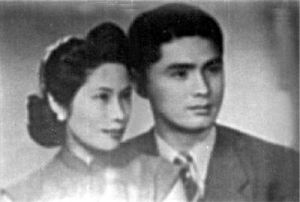
Rong Yiren and wife Yang Jianqing, 1937.

Rong was born on May 1, 1916, in Wuxi, a city near Shanghai in Jiangsu Province. His father Rong Desheng and uncle Rong Zongjing were the founders and operators of a flour and cotton milling business. He graduated with a degree in history from the Christian-run St. John's University. Then he was assigned to manage a part of the family business and he took over the running of all 24 mills upon the death of his elder brother Paul Yung (Rong Yixin) in an air crash on Basalt Island, Hong Kong, on 21 December 1948.

=== Post Chinese Civil War ===
At the end of the Chinese Civil War and the founding of the People's Republic of China, Rong chose to stay in mainland China instead of fleeing to Hong Kong or Taiwan as most businessmen did. His family was allowed to keep their business until 1956, when all private businesses became state-owned. His family was given $6 million in compensation.

In the 1950s, Mao Zedong endorsed him many times for his contributions to the Communist Party. When Korean hostilities broke out, Rong's family contributed substantial amounts of funding along with considerable clothing. He was appointed the vice-mayor of Shanghai in 1957 and Vice Minister of Textiles concurrently since 1959, later served as an economics adviser for the Chinese Communist Party.

=== Cultural Revolution ===
During the Cultural Revolution, he was denounced as a "capitalist". He lost a great deal of his personal wealth and was the target of death threats from the Red Guards, radical youth organizations aligned with the new social and cultural policies of Mao Zedong. In a situation typical of disgraced government officials, entrepreneurs and intellectuals during the Cultural Revolution, Rong was given a demeaning job as a janitor. However, he and his family received protection from Zhou Enlai from persecution from the Red Guards. As Rong was not a Communist party member at the time, Zhou was not able to obtain approval from Mao Zedong to protect Rong officially. Instead, Zhou coordinated with Chen Jinhua to place Rong's mansion under the control of Red Guards affiliated with the Ministry of Textiles, who were deeply sympathetic to him and protected him from other Red Guard factions.

=== Reform and opening up ===
After the death of Mao Zedong and the end of Cultural Revolution, Deng Xiaoping appointed Rong as an advisor for the reform and opening up. He set up the China International Trust and Investment Corp., or CITIC, in 1978, which was responsible for much of the initial western investment in China.

At the height of the pro-democracy movement in 1989, Rong risked his life by asking the top Chinese leaders to negotiate with the students. A week after the Tiananmen Square Protests of 1989, he called the crackdown "extraordinarily wise and correct."

He was appointed to the ceremonial post of vice president in 1993.

=== Later life ===
Rong retired on March 15, 1998, and died on October 26, 2005. He was listed as one of the richest men in Asia, with a family fortune of $1.9 billion in 2000 (equivalent to $4 billion in 2025). Most of this wealth can be attributed to Rong's son Larry Yung in his role as chair of CITIC Pacific.

=== Life and death ===
He died of pneumonia on October 26, 2005, at the age of 89. His funeral was held on November 3, 2005, and he was interred at Babaoshan Revolutionary Cemetery.

== Personal life ==
He married Yang Jianqing (杨鑑清) in 1937. Yang died on January 8, 2014, in Hong Kong.

Political offices
Preceded by Wang Zhen	Vice President of China; 1993–1998	Succeeded by Hu Jintao
Business positions
New title	Chairman of China International Trust and Investment Corporation; 1978–1993	Succeeded by Wei Mingyi
New title	General-manager of China International Trust and Investment Corporation; 1978–1993	Succeeded by Wang Jun
Academic offices
Preceded by Liao Chengzhi	Chairman of the Board of Jinan University; 1985–1993	Succeeded by Qian Weichang
