= Jingning =

Jingning may refer to two counties of the People's Republic of China:

- Jingning County, Gansu (静宁县)
- Jingning She Autonomous County (景宁畲族自治县), Zhejiang
