= CITIC Resources =

Hong Kong natural resources company

CITIC Resources Holdings Limited 中信资源控股有限公司
- Type: State-owned enterprise (Red chip)
- Traded as: SEHK: 1205
- Industry: Natural resources
- Founded: 1997
- Headquarters: Hong Kong, People's Republic of China
- Area served: People's Republic of China and international
- Key people: Mi Zengxin (Chairman)
- Parent: CITIC Group
- Website: resources.citic

CITIC Resources Holdings Limited (Chinese: 中信资源控股有限公司; pinyin: Zhōngxìn Zīyuán Kònggǔ Yǒuxiàn Gōngsī) is a Hong Kong-based natural resources company and a red chip subsidiary of the CITIC Group, one of China's largest state-owned conglomerates. Established in 1997, the company has evolved from a metals trading firm into a vertically integrated natural resources enterprise engaged in oil, coal, aluminum, and commodities trading.

== Corporate affairs ==
CITIC Resources is majority-owned by CITIC Limited, which holds approximately 59.5% of its shares. As a red chip company, it operates with Chinese state backing but is incorporated and listed in Hong Kong. The company's chairman is Mi Zengxin.

The company is listed on the Hong Kong Stock Exchange under stock code SEHK: 1205.

== History ==
In 2007, CITIC Resources acquired oil assets in Kazakhstan and Northeast China from its parent, CITIC Group, for US$1.15 billion. This strategic shift transformed the company from a metals-focused entity into an energy producer. CITIC Resources has since positioned itself as one of the leading Chinese oil producers after PetroChina, Sinopec, and CNOOC.

== Operations ==
=== Crude oil ===
CITIC Resources holds upstream oil assets in:

- Kazakhstan – Operator of the Karazhanbas Oilfield onshore in the Caspian Basin.
- Indonesia – Participates in the Seram Block located in eastern Indonesia.
- China – Operates the Yuedong Oilfield in Liaoning Province through its majority interest in Tincy Group Energy.

These projects provide steady oil production and contribute a major share of the company’s revenue.

=== Coal ===
The company holds stakes in several coal operations:

- Xin Julong Coal Mine (Shandong, China) – A 30% stake in a major Chinese coal mine.
- Coppabella and Moorvale Mines (Australia) – Investments through the Macarthur Coal Joint Venture, specializing in metallurgical coal used for steelmaking.

=== Aluminum ===
CITIC Resources is a joint venture participant in the:

- Portland Aluminum Smelter (Victoria, Australia) – One of the largest aluminum smelting facilities in the Southern Hemisphere, producing ingots for regional and global markets.

=== Commodities trading ===
The company remains active in:

- Trading of base and precious metals
- Import/export of bulk resources including bauxite, alumina, and oil products
- Logistics and distribution support for raw materials across Asia-Pacific
