= CITIC Guoan Information Industry =

- Company type: Public
- Traded as: SZSE: 000839
- Industry: Information technology
- Predecessor: a division of CITIC Guoan Group
- Founded: 1997
- Founder: CITIC Guoan Group
- Headquarters: Beijing, China
- Area served: China
- Key people: Luo Ning (Chairman)
- Products: Computer networks
- Revenue: ▲CN¥2.809 billion (2015)
- Operating income: ▲CN¥383 million (2015)
- Net income: ▲CN¥351 million (2015)
- Total assets: ▼CN¥11.002 billion (2015)
- Total equity: ▲CN¥6.679 billion (2015)
- Owner: CITIC Guoan Group (36.44%); China Securities (1.93%); National Social Security Fund (1.13%); GF Securities (1.12%); others (59.38%)
- Parent: CITIC Guoan Group
- Footnotes / references in a consolidated basis; equity and profit excluded minority interests; in Chinese Accounting Standards

CITIC Guoan Information Industry Co., Ltd.
- Simplified Chinese: 中信国安信息产业股份有限公司
- Traditional Chinese: 中信國安信息產業股份有限公司
Transcriptions

Alternative Chinese name
- Simplified Chinese: 中信国安股份
- Traditional Chinese: 中信國安股份
- Literal meaning: CITIC Guoan Share
Transcriptions

CITIC Guoan Information Industry Co., Ltd. is a Chinese publicly traded company in the computer network infrastructure and information service industries. It includes the construction and operation of cable television networks and satellite information networks, the network system integration, software development and value-added telecommunications services. It was founded in 1997 by its parent company, state-owned enterprise CITIC Guoan Group (now mostly owned by private capitals). It was listed on the Shenzhen Stock Exchange at the same year.

CITIC Guoan Information Industry is a constituent of SZSE 100 Index (blue chip of Shenzhen Stock Exchange) and pan-China index CSI 300 Index (top 300 companies of the two exchanges of the mainland China), as well as its sub-index CSI 200 Index (101st to 300th companies of the two exchanges of the mainland China).
