= CITIC Construction =

Chinese construction and engineering subsidiary of CITIC Group

CITIC Construction Co., Ltd.
- Native name: 中信建设有限责任公司
- Company type: State-owned enterprise
- Industry: Construction, Engineering, Mining
- Founded: 1960; 66 years ago
- Headquarters: Beijing, China
- Parent: CITIC Group
- Website: cici.citic.com

CITIC Construction Co., Ltd. (中信建设有限责任公司) is the construction and engineering subsidiary of the CITIC Group, a major state-owned conglomerate in China. Established in 1960 and headquartered in Beijing, the company is engaged in a wide range of domestic and international infrastructure projects, including housing, transportation, energy, and mining.

== International Projects ==
CITIC Construction has undertaken numerous significant international projects:

- Angola: The company played a pivotal role in constructing the Kilamba Kiaxi satellite town near Luanda. Completed in 2012, this large-scale housing project comprises 750 apartment buildings, schools, and commercial facilities, accommodating approximately 120,000 residents.
- Saudi Arabia: In November 2024, CITIC Construction expanded its presence in the Middle East by launching the Tilal Khuzam project in Riyadh. This development, in partnership with the Saudi National Housing Company and Rafal Real Estate, encompasses 3,500 low-rise apartments over a 630,000 square meter area, with the first phase slated for completion in 2026.
- Indonesia: In March 2024, CITIC Construction was selected to participate in developing Indonesia's new capital city, Nusantara. The company is among seven investors conducting feasibility studies for constructing 70 residential towers for state civil servants, with an estimated investment of Rp50 trillion.
- Kazakhstan: In June 2024, CITIC Construction announced plans to build a $1 billion advanced grain processing plant in the Almaty region. The facility is designed to process up to 1 million tonnes of wheat annually and is expected to create approximately 2,000 jobs.

== Mining Activities ==
CITIC Construction has undertaken a variety of mining-related projects.

- Democratic Republic of the Congo: In February 2025 the company completed the supply-and-installation contract for the Kipushi Zinc Mine's surface processing plant (SMPP), marking a significant milestone in its African mining services business.
- Uzbekistan (historic investment, 2010–2015): In January 2010 CITIC Construction, together with Baiyin Non-Ferrous Group, invested US$185 million in Oxus Gold plc, taking about 59.7 percent of the London-listed company that held a 50 percent interest in the Amantaytau Goldfields joint venture (AGF). Between 2011 and 2013 Uzbek authorities placed AGF into liquidation and its licences were transferred to the state-owned Navoi Mining and Metallurgical Company. Oxus launched a US$1.3 billion UNCITRAL arbitration under the UK–Uzbekistan bilateral investment treaty. In December 2015 the tribunal rejected the expropriation claim and awarded only US$10.3 million for tax-related breaches.

== Affordable Housing Initiatives ==
In June 2015, CITIC Construction partnered with the International Finance Corporation (IFC) to launch a $300 million investment platform aimed at developing affordable housing in Sub-Saharan Africa. The initiative plans to construct 30,000 homes over five years, creating approximately 150,000 jobs and addressing the region's housing shortage.
