= CITIC Guoan Group =

Chinese company

- Formerly: CITIC Guoan Corporation
- Company type: Private
- Industry: Conglomerate
- Founded: 1987 (as Guoan Hotel); 1989 (incorporated); 2011 (as limited company)
- Founder: CITIC Group
- Headquarters: Chaoyang District, Beijing, China
- Area served: Mainland China
- Revenue: ▲CN¥93.527 billion (2015)
- Operating income: ▲CN¥907 million (2015)
- Net income: ▲CN¥556 million (2015)
- Total assets: ▲CN¥157.980 billion (2015)
- Total equity: ▲CN¥14.565 billion (2015)
- Owner: CITIC Group (20.95%); Heilongjiang Dingshang (19.76%); Beijing Heshengyuan (17.79%); Gonghe Holdings (15.81%); Ruiyu (Shanghai) Equity Fund (15.81%); Tianjin Wanshun Properties (9.88%)
- Subsidiaries: CITIC Guoan (100%); – CITIC Guoan I.T. (36.44%); CITIC Guoan Wine (43.89%); Guoan (HK) Holdings (100%); – Global Tech Holdings (53.218%)
- Website: guoan.citic
- Footnotes / references in a consolidated basis; equity and profit excluded minority interests; in Chinese Accounting Standards

CITIC Guoan Group Co., Ltd.
- Simplified Chinese: 中信国安集团有限公司
- Traditional Chinese: 中信國安集團有限公司
Transcriptions

CITIC Guoan Group Co., Ltd. is a Chinese company. The company itself was founded by CITIC Group (who currently owns a 20.95% stake). CITIC Guoan Group is the largest shareholder of CITIC Guoan Information Industry, CITIC Guoan Wine and Global Tech Holdings.

Moreover, Guoan is the second largest shareholder of Baiyin Nonferrous.

== Shareholders ==
CITIC Guoan Group was a wholly owned subsidiary of CITIC Group until 2014. The company had a net assets to total assets ratio of 0.00125 (around 1:799) in a consolidated financial statements as of 31 December 2013 (CN¥94 billion total assets to CN¥119 million equity).

In 2014, the company recapitalized, which several private capitals subscribed the increase. After the recapitalization, the stake of CITIC Guoan Group became one of the few assets of CITIC Group that was not injected to its listed subsidiary CITIC Limited. CITIC Group also disinvested CITIC Limited in 2015.

== Subsidiaries ==
CITIC Guoan Group was the co-founder of Beijing Guoan F.C. However, the stake was now owned by CITIC Limited.

In December 2015, CITIC Guoan Group (via Road Shine Developments and Guoan (HK) Holdings) bought a major stake of Global Tech Holdings for HK$0.11615 per shares.

== Equity investments ==
As of 31 December 2015, CITIC Guoan Group via CITIC Guoan Co., Ltd. owned 2.00% stake in Bank of Shanghai.

== Lithium ==
In June 2023, Bolivia signed an agreement with Citic Guoan Group to develop its lithium reserves, which are the largest in the world. Citic Guoan will invest $857 million and may also construct battery plants and an electric vehicle assembly plant.
