= Yang Jianqing =

Chinese politician, wife of Rong Yiren

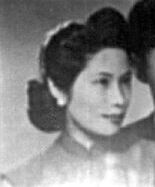

Yang Jianqing (December 1917 – 8 January 2014) was a native of Wuxi. She was the wife of Rong Yiren.

She was a member of the Central Women's Working Committee of the China National Democratic Construction Association, and the deputy director of the Women's Working Committee of the All-China Federation of Industry and Commerce, serving in the third to the fifth executive committee. She was the third executive director of the Red Cross Society of China, the director of the China Children and Youth Foundation, and a member of the fifth through seventh Chinese People's Political Consultative Conference. In 1983, she won the title of March 8th Red Banner Bearer. She had four daughters and one son, Larry Yung, a Chinese businessman.

Yang Jianqing died of illness on 8 January 2014 in Hong Kong.
