= CITIC Limited =

Hong Kong conglomerate

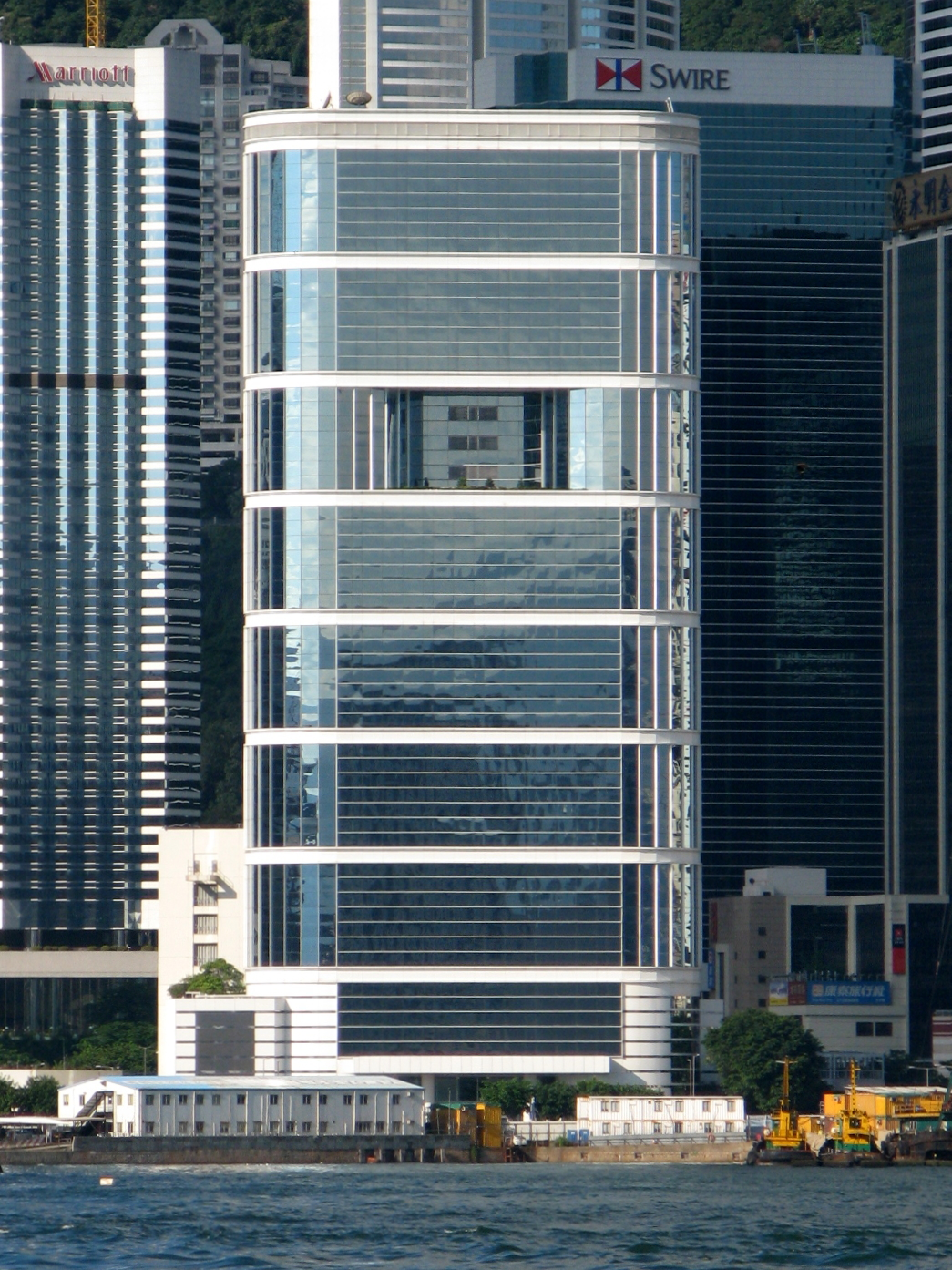
- Headquarters at CITIC Tower
- Native name: 中國中信股份有限公司
- Formerly: CITIC Pacific
- Type: Partial state-owned enterprise; listed company
- Traded as: SEHK: 267; Hang Seng Index component
- Industry: Conglomerate
- Founded: 1990; 36 years ago, in the British Hong Kong
- Headquarters: CITIC Tower, Hong Kong Island, Hong Kong
- Area served: China
- Key people: Chang Zhenming (chairman); Wang Jiong (Vice-chairman); Li Qingping (Executive Director); Pu Jian (Executive Director)
- Revenue: ▲HK$416.8 billion (2015)
- Operating income: ▲HK$89.5 billion (2015)
- Net income: ▲HK$41.8 billion (2015)
- Total assets: ▲HK$6,803.3 billion (2015)
- Total equity: ▲HK479.1 billion (2015)
- Owner: CITIC Group; Itochu-CP joint venture; National Social Security Fund; general public
- Number of employees: 287,910
- Parent: CITIC Group
- Website: www.citic.com
- Footnotes in a consolidated basis (equity and profit excluding perpetual and minority interests)

CITIC Limited (Chinese: 中國中信股份有限公司) is a conglomerate headquartered in Hong Kong. Its shares are listed on the Main Board of the Hong Kong Stock Exchange, and it is a constituent of the Hang Seng Index. 58% of its issued shares are owned by the Chinese state-owned CITIC Group.

It is principally engaged in financial services, resources and energy, manufacturing, engineering contracting, real estate and other businesses.

== History ==
=== 2008 Foreign exchange losses controversy ===
In October 2008, the chairman Larry Yung disclosed that the firm lost HK$15 billion (US$2 billion) due to "unauthorized trades". The unauthorised trades were hedges with a contract value of A$9 billion against the Australian dollar, taken out to cover against a A$1.6 billion prospective acquisition and capital expenditure. Losses were incurred on the contracts when the currency declined from 98.5% against the US dollar to less than 70%. Its parent company, CITIC Group pledged its support to this subsidiary.

The board became aware of this on 7 September 2008, and disclosure was made to the financial markets after trading in its shares was suspended on 20 October. The company and the Hong Kong Securities and Futures Commission faced questions by legislators about the severe delays in their disclosure, considering the company made a pursuant to a proposed acquisition, that as at 9 September 2008, "the Directors are not aware of any material adverse change in the financial or trading position of the Group since 31 December 2007". When the shares resumed trading, the share price had fallen by some 75% since the previous close.

As a result of the revelations, two officers were forced to resign in disgrace. Due to her involvement in the loss, the chairman's daughter was demoted. The chairman claimed his daughter Frances Yung had not informed him about the situation before its discovery. Managing director Henry Fan temporarily stepped down from the Executive Council and the chairmanship of the Mandatory Provident Fund Schemes Authority, and all other major public positions he held with effect 24 October 2008.

On 3 April 2009, trading in CITIC Pacific shares was once again suspended, and the Hong Kong Police searched the company's office as part of an investigation into whether the company directors had made false statements about the foreign-exchange contracts, as well as company announcements made between July 2007 and March 2009, or had conspired to defraud. On 8 April, chairman Larry Yung resigned, citing the effect of the Commercial Crimes Bureau's visit to the company on public opinion; managing director Henry Fan resigned at the same time. They were replaced by Chang Zhenming, the Chairman of the CITIC Group.

=== Recent history ===
CITIC Pacific bought most of the assets from the parent company and issued new shares to the parent, making most of the assets of CITIC Group were listed in a stock exchange. However, CITIC Group still retained the stake in CITIC Guoan Group.

In 2014 the name of the company was also changed from CITIC Pacific Limited (Chinese: 中信泰富有限公司) to just CITIC Limited (Chinese: 中國中信股份有限公司).

On 20 January 2015, the Japanese general trading company Itochu and its Thai cross-shareholding affiliate Charoen Pokphand announced an investment of approx. HK$80 billion (US$10.4 billion) in CITIC Limited, the largest investment ever made by a Japanese general trading company. The transaction is also the largest acquisition in China by a Japanese company, and the largest investment by foreigners in a Chinese state-owned enterprise.

The deal saw Chia Tai Bright Investment, a 50–50 joint venture of Itochu and Charoen Pokphand, acquire a 10% stake of CITIC Limited from CITIC Group for HK$34.4 billion (US$4.54 billion), as well as subscribing new convertible preferred shares for HK$45.9 billion (US$5.9 billion). Before the deal, CITIC Group owned 77.90% stake, with National Social Security Fund owned an additional 5.00%, making only 17.1% shares of CITIC Limited were free float at 31 December 2014. The company also had HK$13.834 billion perpetual capital securities at 31 December 2014.

On 9 January 2017 the consortium of CITIC Limited, private equity funds of CITIC Capital and Carlyle, bought 80% stake of the franchise rights of McDonald's in Hong Kong and mainland China, for a total consideration of up to US$2.08 billion. CITIC Limited and CITIC Capital would own 52% stake collectively (via an intermediate holding, Fast Food Holdings in a 61.54–38.46 ratio, indirectly owned 32% and 20% stake respectively), while Carlyle would own 28% separately. 20% stake would be retained by McDonald's via Golden Arches Investments Limited (the trading name of McDonald's Hong Kong). In January 2020, CITIC invited other investors to buy most of their stake in the aforementioned Fast Food Holdings.

== Subsidiaries ==
- CITIC Trust (100%)
- CITIC Pacific Limited (100%)
- Tamar Alliance (100%)

== Equity investments ==
- Beijing Sinobo Guoan F.C. (36%)
- AsiaSat (37.22% via a joint venture)
