= Chang Zhenming =

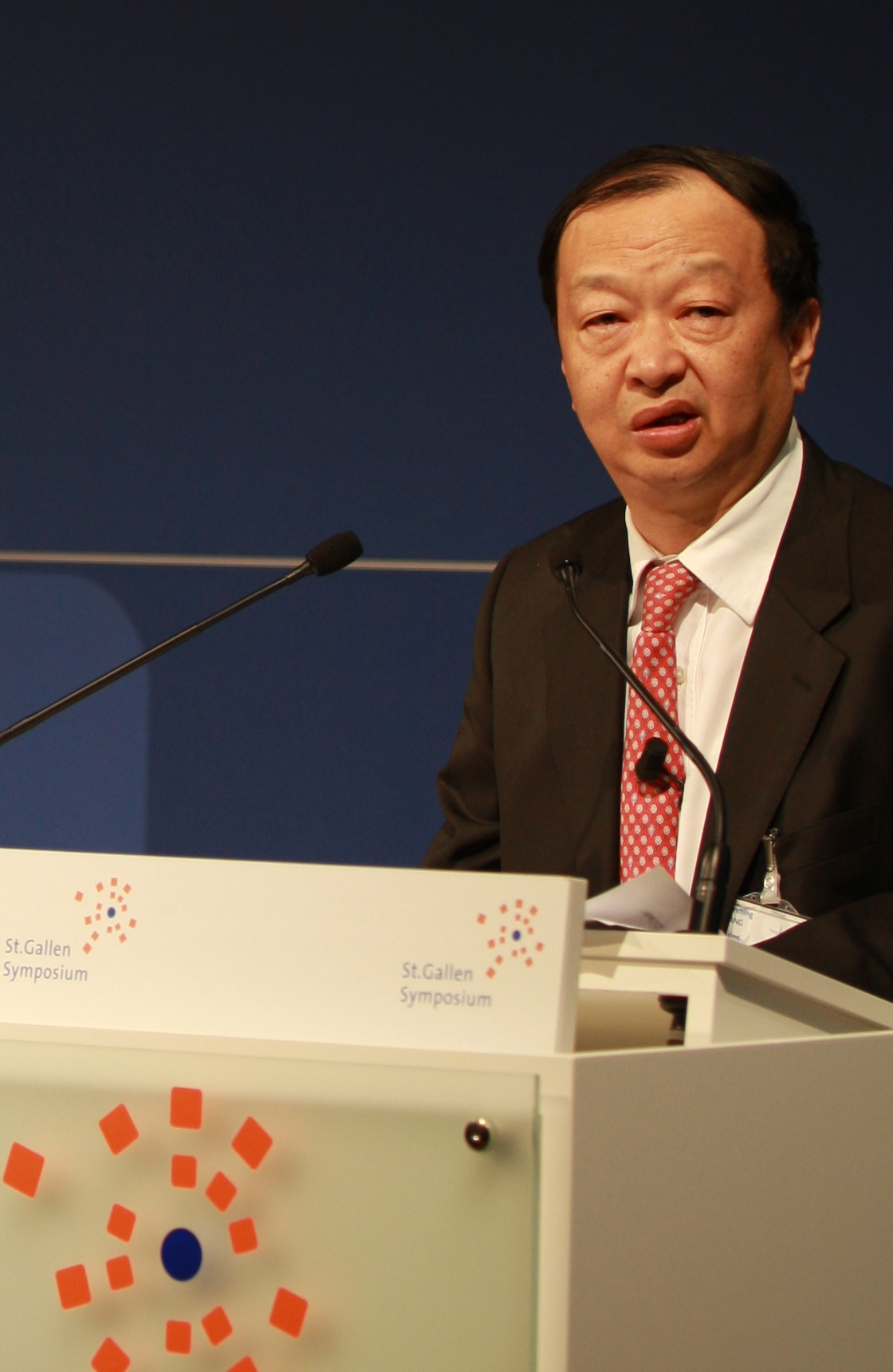
Image of Chang Zhenming

Chang Zhenming (Simplified Chinese: 常振明), born October 1956 in Beijing, China, is the Chairman of CITIC Group and the Chairman and Managing Director of CITIC Group's Hong Kong listed subsidiary company, CITIC Pacific.

== Education and early life ==
From 1971 to 1977, Chang Zhenming worked at the Dining Hall of the School Affairs Department at Tsinghua University. From 1979 to 1983, he studied Japanese Literature at the Beijing International Studies University, then from 1984 to 1985, he received on-job training at Daiwa Securities in Japan.

Chang Zhenming additionally holds a Master of Business Administration from the College of Insurance in New York City, United States.

== Career ==
From 1985 to 1989, Chang Zhenming was deputy manager of the Treasury division at the China International Trust and Investment Corporation, then deputy manager of the CITIC Industrial Bank, in charge of foreign exchange and bond business.

From 1989 to 1992, Chang Zhenming was deputy representative at the CITIC's office in New York.

From October 1992 to January 1994, Chang Zhenming was vice president of the CITIC Industrial Bank, in charge of fund-raising by issuing bond in the international market, foreign exchange and securities.

From January 1994 to March 2002, Chang Zhenming was assistant president, executive director and vice-president of China Trust and Investment Corporation, in charge of establishing the securities, insurance and trust branches of CITIC, as well as non-banking financial business.

From March 2002 to July 2004, Chang Zhenming was the executive director and vice president of CITIC Group, in charge of non-financial and Hong Kong businesses.

From July 2004 to July 2006, he was vice chairman and president of the China Construction Bank.

Since July 2006, he has been the vice chairman, president, and non-executive director of the CITIC Group. At age 55, his salary is estimated at 2,220,000 USD.

== Other ==
Chang Zhenming is a former president of International Go Federation. He is a former professional go player, awarded 7 Professional Dan in 1982. A member of China National Team and one of the strongest Chinese players in the late 1970s and early 1980s, he took third place in 1979 New Sport Weiqi Tournament, after Nie Weiping who took first and Chen Zude who took second. He later started career in banking and finance instead of Weiqi.
