= CITIC Group =

Chinese state-owned investment company

CITIC Group Corporation Ltd.

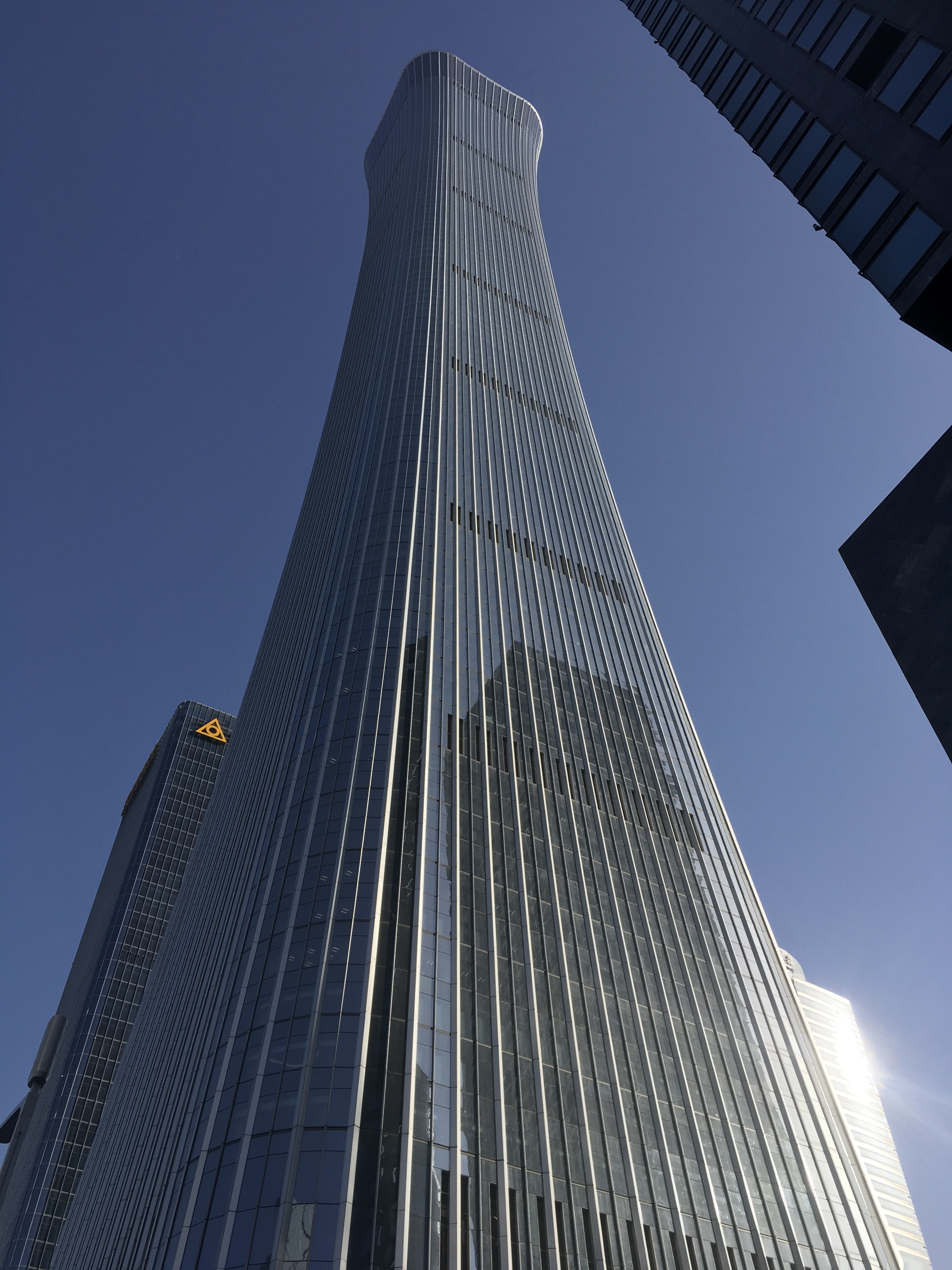
- Headquarters at China Zun
- Native name: 中国中信集团有限公司
- Company type: State-owned enterprise
- Industry: Conglomerate
- Founded: July 1, 1979; 46 years ago
- Founder: Rong Yiren
- Headquarters: Beijing, China
- Key people: Chang Zhenming (chairman); Jiong Wang (vice chairman, president, Member of Executive Committee and Member of Nomination Committee); Jianzhong Dou (Executive Director and Member of Executive Committee); Wei Min Ju (CFO)
- Products: Metals; Oil & gas Construction; Food
- Services: Financial services Investments
- Revenue: US$ 131.2 billion (2023)
- Net income: US$ 4.124 billion (2023)
- Total assets: US$ 1,617.6 billion (2023)
- Number of employees: 213,290 (2023)
- Parent: Ministry of Finance
- Subsidiaries: CITIC Limited

Chinese name
- Simplified Chinese: 中国中信集团有限公司
- Traditional Chinese: 中國中信集團有限公司
Transcriptions
Standard Mandarin
- Hanyu Pinyin: Zhōngguó zhōngxìn jítuán yǒuxiàn gōngsī

CITIC Group
- Simplified Chinese: 中信集团
- Traditional Chinese: 中信集團
Transcriptions
Standard Mandarin
- Hanyu Pinyin: zhōngxìn jítuán
- Website: www.group.citic
- Footnotes / references in a consolidated basis; equity and profit excluded minority interests; in Chinese Accounting Standards

CITIC Group Corporation Ltd., formerly the China International Trust & Investment Corporation (CITIC), is a state-owned investment company of the People's Republic of China, established by Rong Yiren in 1979 with the approval of Deng Xiaoping. Its headquarters are in Chaoyang District, Beijing. As of 2019, it is China's biggest state-run conglomerate with one of the largest pools of foreign assets in the world. In 2023, the company was ranked 71st in the Forbes Global 2000.

== Businesses ==
Its initial aim was to "attract and utilize foreign capital, introduce advanced technologies, and adopt advanced and scientific international practice in operation and management." It now owns 44 subsidiaries including China CITIC Bank, CITIC Limited, CITIC Trust and CITIC Merchant (mainly banks) in mainland China, Hong Kong, the United States, Canada, Australia and New Zealand.

== History ==
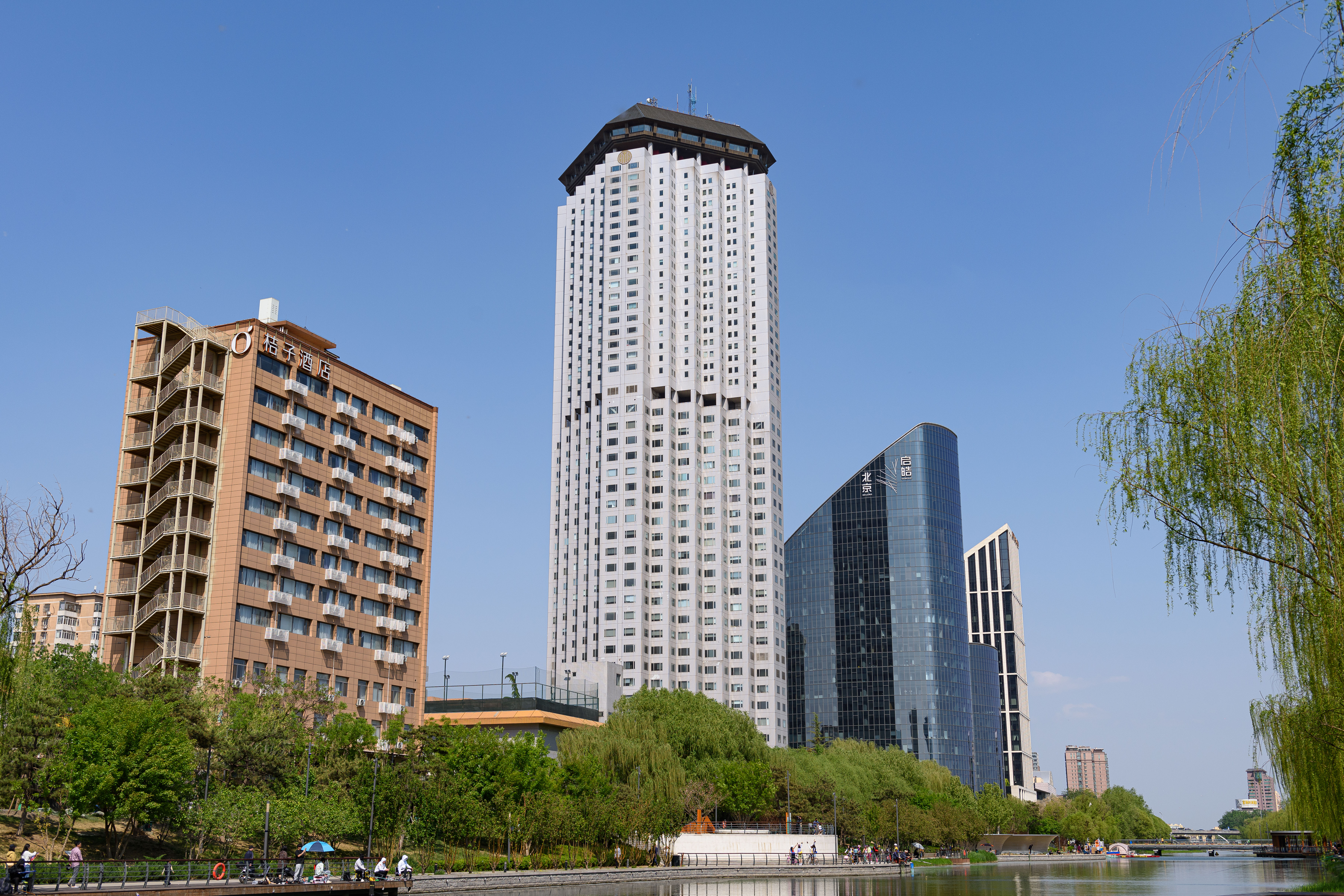
Capital Mansion was the former headquarters of CITIC from July 1991 to 16 January 2020

CITIC Group was founded as the China International Trust Investment Corporation (Chinese: 中国国际信托投资公司; abb. CITIC), a Chinese state-owned enterprise in 1979. In the 1980s, Chinese government founded many for profit corporations, which CITIC was under the leadership of Rong Yiren, a former businessman and politician at that time, who chose to stay in the mainland China in the 1950s after his family business was nationalized. His son, Larry Yung, (Note: Yung was another transliteration of the same surname: simplified Chinese: 荣; traditional Chinese: 榮; pinyin: Róng.) was the former chairman of CITIC Group's listed subsidiary CITIC Pacific. Larry also led the Hong Kong office and parent company of CITIC Pacific since 1986; Larry became a Hong Kong–based businessman since 1978. Throughout the 1980s, Xiong Xianghui served as CITIC vice chair and significant CITIC leadership was drawn from the Intelligence Bureau of the Joint Staff Department.

CITIC Group headquarters was based in Beijing; Hong Kong office was formally opened in 1985. The mainland-based CITIC Bank was founded by the group in 1984. The group also acquired 12.5% stake of the Hong Kong flag carrier Cathay Pacific in 1987, and became a member of a shareholders' agreement in 2006; the stake was sold to fellow state-owned company Air China in 2009. The group also acquired Hong Kong–based Ka Wah Bank in 1986. In 1990, the group also absorbed some of the subsidiaries of another state-owned company, 中国康华发展总公司. Other notable acquisitions included 38.3% stake of another airline Dragonair, 20% stake of Hong Kong Telecom, etc.

CITIC also acquired a Hong Kong listed company and renamed to CITIC Pacific in the 1990s.

=== 2000s ===
Beginning in 2008, CITIC Group had the lead role in developing Quilamba in Angola as part of an exchange of Chinese construction materials and expertise for Angolan natural resources.

Its subsidiary, CITIC Pacific (Chinese: 中信泰富, now known as CITIC Limited), made unauthorized bets on the foreign currency market in October 2008 and lost HK$14.7 billion (US$1.9 billion, when accounted for in mark-to-market terms). Senior executives such as Financial Controller Chau Chi-Yin and Group Finance Director Leslie Chang resigned. Its stock price plunged 55.1 percent upon the resumption of trade.

In 2015, CITIC Group sold 10% stake of CITIC Limited to a joint-venture of Itochu and Charoen Pokphand for HK$34.4 billion (US$4.54 billion); the joint venture also subscribed new convertible preferred shares for HK$45.9 billion (or US$5.9 billion). It was reported it was the largest investment ever made by a Japanese general trading company. The transaction is also the largest acquisition in China by a Japanese company, and the largest investment by foreigners in a Chinese state-owned enterprise.

In 2023, China Huarong Asset Management, the company that manages the troubled assets, contracted to buy 5.01 percent of Citic Limited for HK$13.6 billion (US$1.7 billion). Huarong will acquire a stake from CITIC Group's subsidiary, Citic Polaris. In addition, Huarong plans to change the name to China Citic Financial Asset Management. The deal is a return on the investment that CITIC invested in 2021, leading the rescue of Huarong.

== CITIC CEFC bond default ==
In November 2016, CITIC CLSA acted as the sole bookrunner for CEFC Shanghai's US$250 bond issuance. CITIC CLSA hid from the market that the bond deal was only 60% subscribed at pricing. It manipulated the bond price in the secondary market in an effort to offload the 100mm USD bond CITIC CLSA held on its balance sheet.

In May 2018, CITIC Group announced they would repay ca 450 million euros owed by CEFC Europe to finance and banking group J&T within days but since the debt was not paid a week later, J&T announced it had taken over shareholder rights and installed crisis management at CEFC Europe. Several days later, CEFC Shanghai defaulted on $327 million in bond payments, and offered to make the payments six months after the maturity date.

In October 2020, some retail CEFC bondholders in Hong Kong filed a complaint to the Securities and Futures Commission in Hong Kong against the bond's sole underwriter CITIC CLSA.

== Group companies ==
- CITIC Limited, a subsidiary of CITIC group in Hong Kong
  - CITIC Trust
  - China CITIC Bank
    - CITIC International Financial Holdings
      - CITIC Bank International
- CITIC Resources
- CITIC Construction
- CITIC Newedge
- CITIC Real Estate
- CITIC Capital
  - Amoy Food
- CITIC Metal Group
- CITIC Press Group

== Equity investments ==
- CITIC Guoan Group (20.95%)
- CITIC Securities

== See also ==
- CITIC Plaza, a skyscraper in Guangzhou
- CITIC Tower, a skyscraper in Hong Kong
- CITIC Securities
