= China CITIC Bank International =

Hong Kong full-service commercial bank

China CITIC Bank International Limited
- Type: Privately owned
- Industry: Banking
- Founded: 1922; 104 years ago
- Headquarters: Hong Kong
- Key people: CEO
- Operating income: ▲HKD10.91 billion (2025)
- Net income: ▲HKD7.75 billion (2025)
- Total assets: ▲HKD550.61 billion (2025)
- Parent: CITIC International Financial Holdings
- Website: www.cncbinternational.com

Former CITIC Ka Wah Bank logo

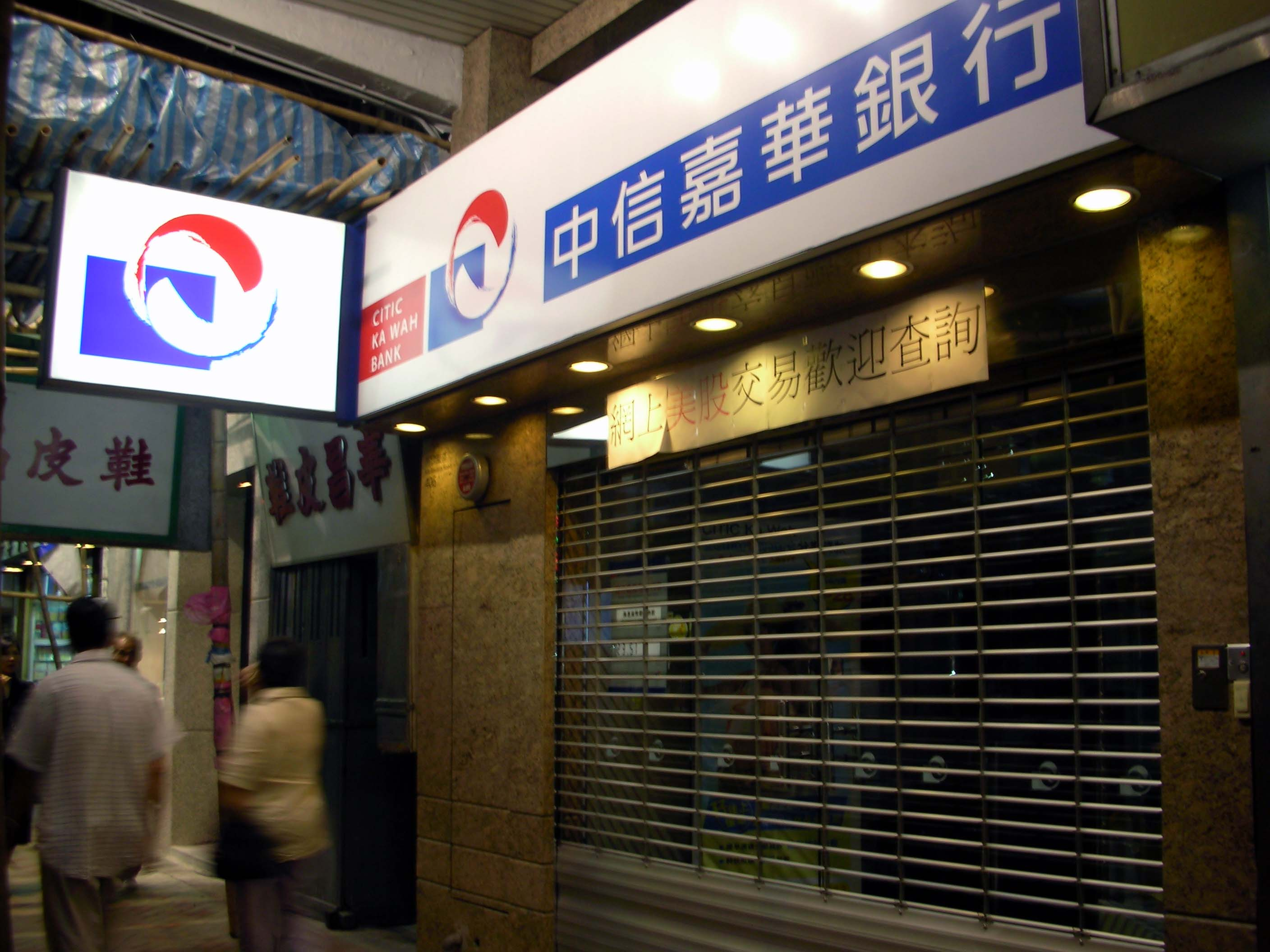
To Kwa Wan Branch of CITIC Ka Wah Bank

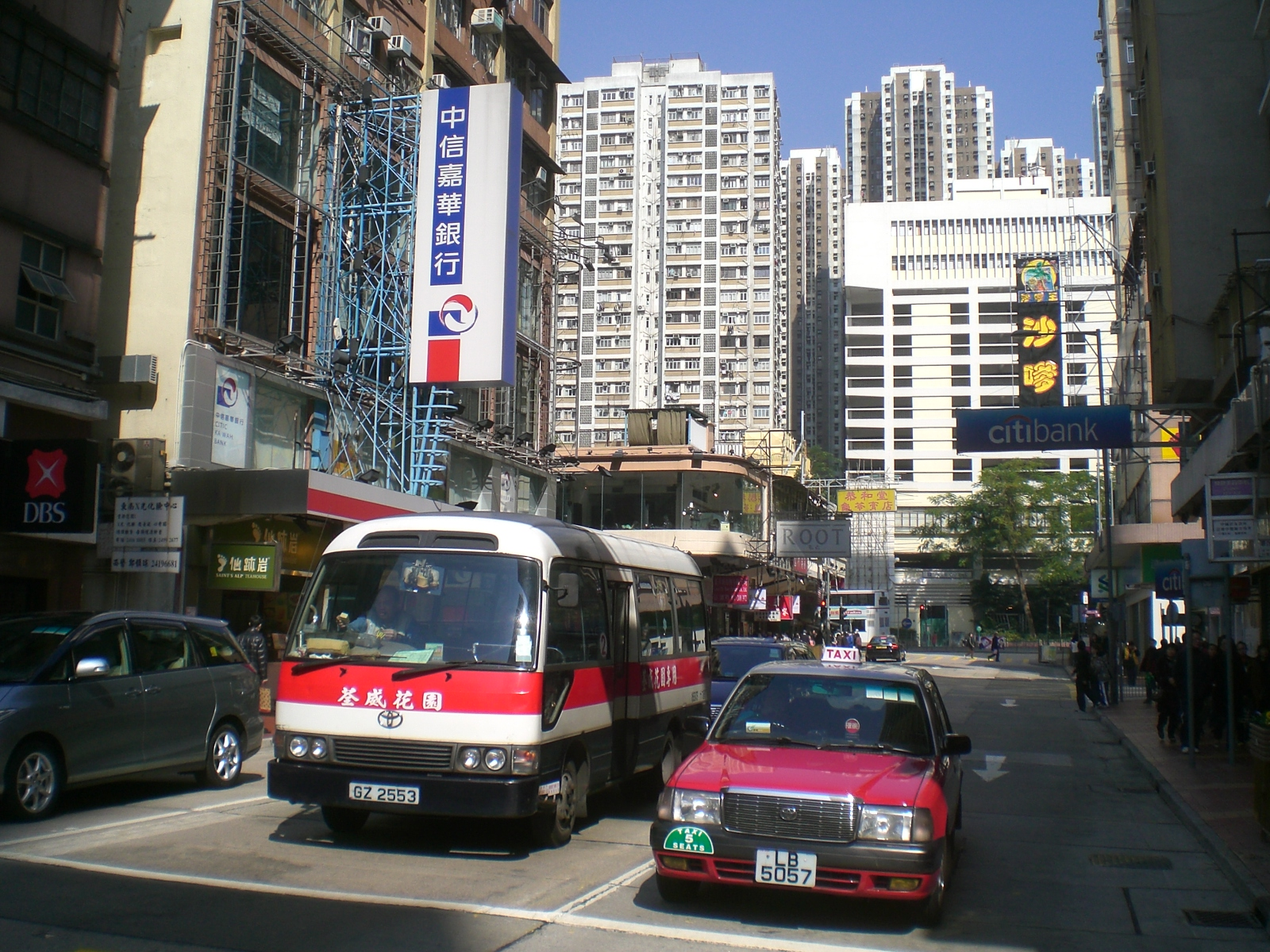
Tsuen Wan Branch of CITIC Ka Wah Bank

China CITIC Bank International (Chinese: 中信銀行 (國際); CNCBI in short) is a Hong Kong full-service commercial bank.

China CITIC Bank Corporation Limited, via its wholly owned subsidiary CITIC International Financial Holdings Limited, is CNCBI's controlling shareholder with a 75% stake. The CITIC Group Corporation of Beijing is CNCBI's ultimate parent company.

As of the end of December 2025, CNCBI had 21 branches and two business banking centres in Hong Kong, as well as presence in various international locations. CNCBI's total assets stood at HK$550.61 billion.

== History ==
In 1926 Ka Wah Savings Bank Limited (嘉華儲蓄銀行有限公司) was founded in Hong Kong. Ka Wah Ngan Ho in Guangzhou then became Ka Wah Savings Bank's Guangzhou Branch. That same year the bank was renamed as Ka Wah Bank Public Limited Company (嘉華銀行公眾有限公司).

In 1986 the bank suffered financial difficulties, and CITIC Group injected HK$350 million capital into the bank. In 1998 the bank was renamed as CITIC Ka Wah Bank Limited.

In 2002 CITIC Ka Wah Bank was privatized by CITIC International Financial Holdings and it became a whole-owned subsidiary of CITIC International Financial Holdings.

In May 2010, the bank was renamed again as China CITIC Bank International.

In 2018, CNCBI launched its mobile banking platform inMotion.
