= Lippo Group =

Indonesian conglomerate company

- Type: Private
- Industry: Conglomerate
- Founded: 1950; 76 years ago
- Founder: Mochtar Riady
- Headquarters: Jakarta, Indonesia
- Key people: John Riady (CEO); Mochtar Riady (Chairman Emeritus); James Riady (Chairman)
- Products: Real estate, media, telecommunications, electronics, property, finance, health, education
- Services: Financial services, Commercial and residential property development
- Owner: Riady family
- Subsidiaries: Lippo Village; Lippo Cikarang; Siloam Hospitals; Matahari Department Store
- Website: lippogroup.com

Lippo Group is an Indonesian multinational conglomerate company. The company operates internationally providing property development and management services. Founded by Mochtar Riady, Lippo Group has a collective presence across Asia and North America. It is one of the largest real estate developers in Indonesia, and is known for various large-scale projects such as Lippo Village. Lippo Group's member Lippo Karawaci is a listed company.

== History ==
=== 1980s ===
The Lippo Group began with Lippo Bank, after its founder Mochtar Riady bought shares of Bank Perniagaan Indonesia (BPI) owned by businessman Hasyim Ning in 1981 that was struggling at the time. Mochtar bought the shares when he was holding important position in Bank Central Asia (BCA) that was back then owned by Salim Group and took 49% of its shares which later he share with Salim Group founder Sudono Salim. BPI, later with two other banks acquired by Mochtar such as Bank Bhumi Bahari and Bank Umum Asia to form Lippo Bank after he left BCA. Later the bank became used as a platform for regional property development projects.

=== 1990s-2015 ===
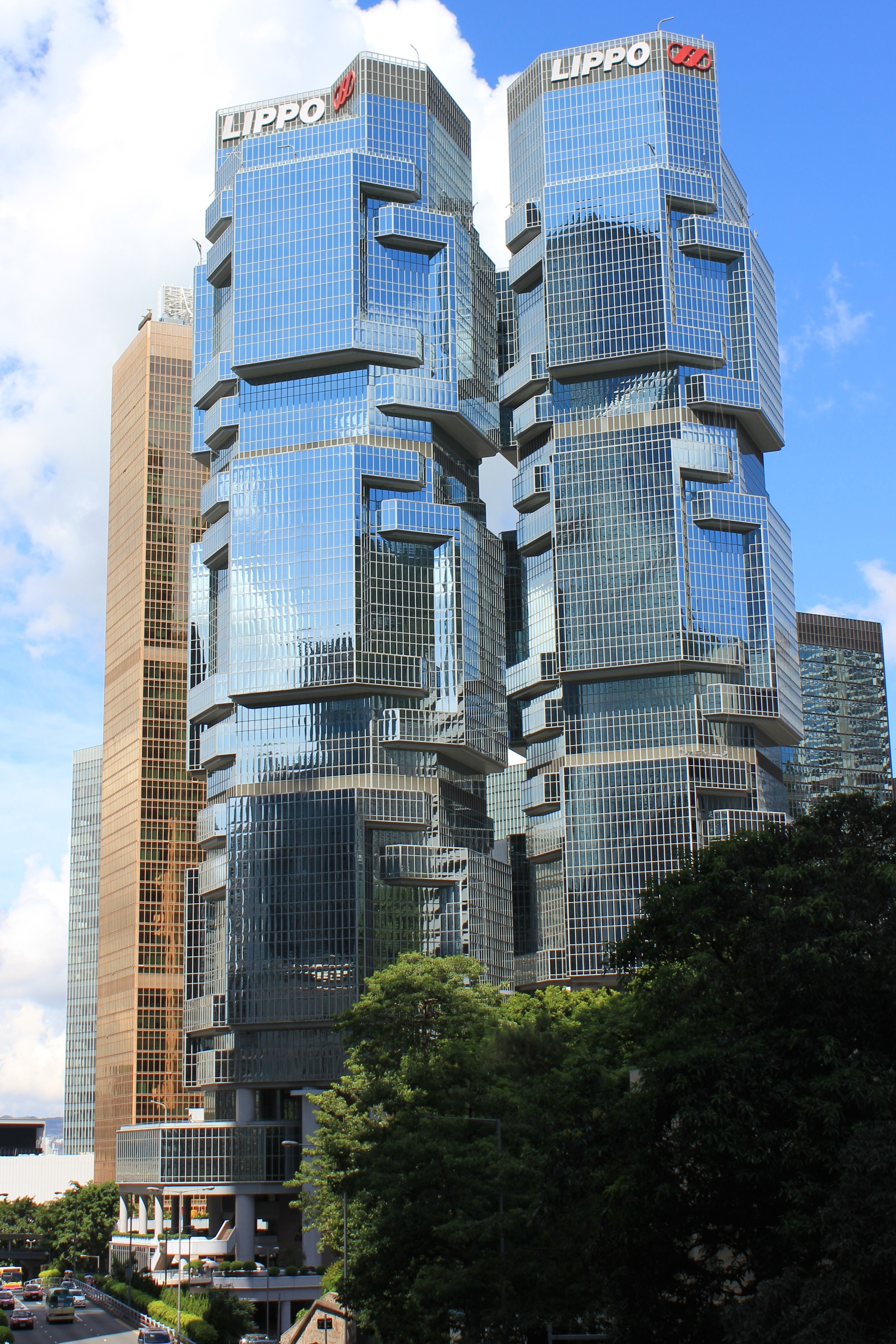
Lippo Centre in Hong Kong in 2011

After its banking success, Lippo officially entered the property sector in 1990 under its subsidiary PT. Tunggal Reksakencana. The project initially started after Lippo Bank confiscated plots of land owned by its troubled customers in 3 different locations; Karawaci, Cikarang, and Karawang. In order to develop the confiscated lands, Mochtar flew to Shenzhen, China to do a comparative study in order apply the Shenzhen urban development model to his property development plan. In 1990, Lippo Cikarang was opened in Bekasi to serve as industrial hub for Japanese companies and as elite residential in the outskirt of Jakarta. Concurrently, Lippo also unveiled Lippo Karawaci which construction was completed in 1996 and include numerous infrastructures such as schools, hospital, shopping mall, hotel, and golf course. Lippo also developed a luxury cemetery San Diego Hills in Karawang that was inspired by Forest Lawn Memorial Park in the United States.

In 1993, the Lippo Group delved into the education market by establishing Pelita Harapan University and Pelita Harapan School, In 2001, with the newly minted Putian University (in Putian, Fujian Province, China) Lippo provided international training (using English) for specially-selected accounting and computer science students.

In 1997, via its investment wing Multipolar, Lippo Group bought majority shares of Matahari Putra Prima and its subsidiary Matahari Department Store from Hari Darmawan, it was rumoured that Hari owed unpaid debt to Lippo Bank and have to take care of his ill family members. The strategy was said to strengthen Lippo position in retail sector. Previously Multipolar was known to have brought Walmart and JCPenney license to operate in Indonesia from 1995 until 1998.

After the 1997 Asian financial crisis, Indonesian Bank Restructuring Agency (BPPN) took over partial ownership of Lippo Bank to boost its capital. Later BPPN sold 52,05% of controlling stake to SwissAsia in 2004. SwissAsia would later sold the controlling stake shortly to Malaysian sovereign wealth fund Khazanah Nasional and was renamed Bank CIMB Niaga after its merger with Bank Niaga. After losing control over Lippo Bank to CIMB, Lippo re-entered banking industry in 2010 with Nobu Bank, amid smaller scale compared to Lippo Bank.

In 2005, Maxis Communications purchased 44% of Axis Telecom from Lippo Group, and in September 2008, Maxis began actively managing it, after Saudi Telecom bought a 51% stake.

=== 2016-2026 ===
In 2016, company founder Mochtar Riady was chairman of Lippo Group. In 2017, Lippo Group launched the development Meikarta, a township in Jakarta. It will integrate houses, shopping malls, and schools and hospitals. In 2018, Indonesia was investigating a possible bribery case related to Lippo Group's Lippo Cikarang run Meikarta project, it's largest and costing $21 billion. In October 2018, Lippo Group deputy chairman James Riady was summoned as a witness in the bribery probe. Construction remained underway at Mekarta. In 2018, Lippo Group had annual revenue of $8 billion.

In 2019, John Riady became CEO, and still was in 2024. In 2025, the Meikarta project remained "stalled," with Lippo Group chairman John Riady pledging it would resolve its problems within the year. In March 2026, Lippo Group donated 30 hectares of land to the Indonesian government, to be used for affordable housing.

In 2025, the Singapore High Court held Lippo Marina Collection (a unit of Lippo Group) liable for inflating loans on apartments, with a judgement of $17.7 million. That was increased to $82.4 million in October 2026 after an appeal.

== Company group and holdings ==
Lippo Group controls assets with significant investments in retail, media, real estate, banking, natural resources, hospitality, and healthcare. Its unit Lippo Karawaci is a listed company.

=== Financial ===
- Nobu Bank
- Lippo General Insurance

=== Media and internet ===
Media holdings in 2026:

- First Media (formerly PT Broadband Multimedia)
- BeritaSatu Media Group
- kemang Buzz
- Campus Life
- The Straits Times
- Jakarta Globe
- Suara Pembaruan
- Investor Daily
- bridestory.com
- GCI (Gift Card Indonesia)
- GrabTaxi - app for ride-hailing and food delivery
- Multipolar Technologies

=== Education ===
- Pelita Harapan Education Foundation - 3 schools as of 2026
  - Pelita Harapan University
  - Pelita Harapan School
  - UPH Medan

=== Retail ===
Retail holdings as of 2026:

- Matahari Department Store (see Matahari Putra Prima)
- Timezone video arcades
- Books & Beyond
- LinkNet
- Boston Health and Beauty
- Hypermart
- Foodmart
- BiG
- Auric Pacific Group Limited (Auric Pacific) - Lippo owns 49% of the food and beverage group

=== Property and real estate ===
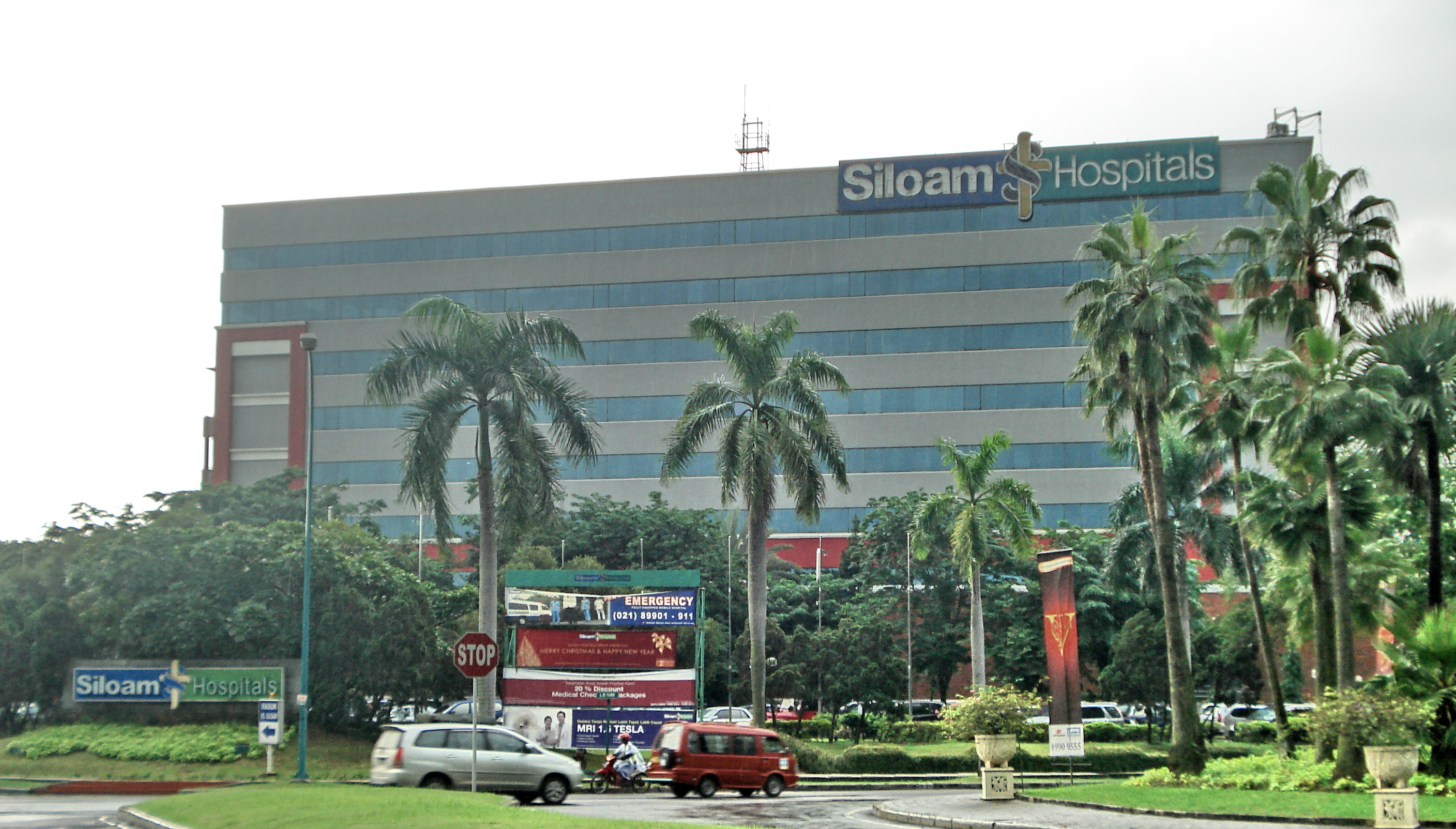
Siloam Hospital at Lippo Cikarang

- OUE - listed on the Singapore Stock Exchange, property development of Lippo outside of Indonesia
- Lippo Karawaci - all of Lippo Group's property units are consolidated as part of Lippo Karawaci.
  - Aryaduta Hotels - eight hotels as of 2026
  - Siloam Hospitals Group - 20 hospitals as of 2026
  - Lippo Malls - malls as of 2026 include GTC Makassar, Plaza Medan Fair, Bandung Indah Plaza, Sun Plaza, Istana Plaza, City of Tomorrow in Surabaya, Lippo Mall Kemang, Lippo Mall Nusantara, Lippo Mall Puri, Pluit Village, Metropolis Town Square, Bellanova Country Mall, Senayan Park, Lippo Plaza Jember, Blu Plaza, Citywalk Elvee, Citywalk Lippo Cikarang, Kediri Town Square, Lippo Icon Cibubur, Lippo Icon Gajah Mada, Lipp Mall Cikarang, Depok Town Square, Lippo Plaza Ekalokasari Bogor, Lippo Plaza Jambi, Tamini Square, and Lippo Plaza Kramat Jati, among others.
  - Lippo Village
  - Meikarta
  - Lippo Cikarang
  - Menara Matahari
  - Lippo Land Club

Other Lippo Group properties have included Lippo Homes, Benton Junction, Country Club, Permata Sport Club, Commodity Square, and San Diego Hills Memorial Park.

=== Former holdings ===
- Cinépolis Indonesia (formerly known as Cinemaxx; now owned by Cinépolis)
- OVO (sold to Grab)

== Criticism and Controversies ==
Lately, Lippo Group are often being associated by its shady business practices due to scandals that has financially harmed its business partners and other business owners. Practices such as bribery, hostile takeovers, and frauds have been widely reported by its business partners or among politicians the group interacted in the past.

=== Bill Clinton campaign scandal ===
In 1996, James Riady, was in involved in US President Bill Clinton reelection campaign scandal. James Riady and his associate John Huang were indicted and pleaded guilty to campaign finance violations by himself and his corporation. He was ordered to pay an US$ 8.6 million fine for contributing foreign funds to the Democratic Party, the largest fine ever levied in a campaign finance case.

=== Lippo Bank double financial statement ===
In 2002, Lippo Bank was under fire for making a false financial statement that were released to public and Jakarta Stock Exchange. It was started when Lippo Bank Q3 report that was published on 30 September. Lippo Bank stated that there was a discrepancy between the information in the financial report presented to the public through advertisements in national newspapers on November 28, 2002 and the financial report submitted to the Jakarta Stock Exchange.

The report is presented in the form of a comparison between 30 September 2002 (audited) and 30 September 2001 (unaudited). It is stated that the Value of Foreclosed Collateral as of September 30, 2002 was 2.393 trillion rupiah (US$257 million at the time) , total assets as of September 30 were 24.185 trillion rupiah (US$2.60 billion), Profit for the year as of September 30, 2002 was 98.77 billion rupiah (US$10.61 million), and the Minimum Available Capital Liability Ratio (CAR) was 24.77%. In the Financial Report of Lippo Bank as of September 30, the same date as that submitted to the Jakarta Stock Exchange on December 27, a different report was submitted. The report included a statement from Lippo Bank management that the Financial Report submitted was an "audited" Financial Report and was not accompanied by an independent auditor's report containing a Public Accountant's opinion.

As a result, Lippo Bank was fined 2.5 billion rupiah (US$291,500 in 2003) for mismanagement. After the verdict, Indonesian Bank Restructuring Agency (BPPN) held a meeting to restructure the Lippo Bank board of directors.

== See also ==
- Lippo Limited, a Hong Kong listed company also owned by Riady
  - Hongkong Chinese Limited, a Hong Kong listed company
    - Hongkong Chinese Bank, a Hong Kong bank that was sold by Hongkong Chinese Limited in 2002 and became defunct in the same year due to merger
- Lippo China Resources
