= Menara Matahari =

Skyscraper in Indonesia

Menara Matahari (Indonesian for "Matahari Tower") is a 41-storey, 162-metre (531 ft)-high commercial office and residential skyscraper located at Palem Raya Boulevard 7 in Lippo Karawaci, Tangerang, Indonesia.

== Description ==
Menara Matahari is located directly next to the Universitas Pelita Harapan (UPH) campus / Times Bookstore, and across the street from Benton Junction (restaurant strip) and Supermal Karawaci. It is the tallest office building in Lippo Karawaci. Entrance to the office buildings is located on Palem Raya Blvd.; entrance to the residences is at the rear toward UPH. Entry to the residential area requires a passkey.

== Occupants ==
=== Residential Side ===
- Apartments
- FoodMart Convenience Store (lobby level)
  - Prima Laundry & Dry Cleaning (located inside FoodMart; lobby level)
- Ngopi Time (coffee shop and restaurant)

=== Commercial Side ===
- UNO Cafe (lobby level)
- James Riady's Art Collection, 3rd Floor
- AIG
- Lippo Group marketing gallery
- Aerotravel / PT Satriavi Travel Service
- PT Matahari Putra Prima, Tbk. (parent company of Matahari and Hypermart)
- Multipolar
- PT Maxx Coffee Prima
