= Charis Global School =

Private school in West Java, Indonesia

Charis Global School Lippo Cikarang
- Lippo Cikarang; Indonesia

Information
- Type: Private, National Plus
- Motto: Nurturing Global Citizens
- Established: 2007
- Principal: Aminah Salim
- Head of school: Ruel Diwa
- Average class size: 20 students
- Student to teacher ratio: 1:6
- Campus: M.H Thamrin Business Park Kav 135-A Lippo Cikarang
- Color
- Website: www.charisglobalschool.com

Charis Global School is a private National Plus school in Lippo Cikarang, Bekasi City, West Java, Indonesia. Essentially, the school programs are developed into three categories: Early Childhood Program (Nursery 1–2 and Kindergarten 1–2), Primary Program (Grade 1 to 6) and Secondary Program (Grade 7 to 9).

The school provides an English-medium education system besides Bahasa Indonesia as the language of instruction for Indonesian-based subjects. The student composition is primarily Indonesian but includes other nationalities. There are expatriate students mainly from Korea, Japan, China, Malaysia, and India.

== History ==
Charis Global School was established in 2007 for local and expatriate students living in Lippo Cikarang.

The school has grown rapidly after initially opening only a pre-school level that offers the Early Childhood Programs. In 2009, the school started its Primary Program. The school changed its name to Charis Global School from Charis Global International School to comply with the Indonesian government's regulations on prohibiting the use of word "international" in school names.

By 2016, the school had expanded into its Secondary Program.

Today the school has a total staff of about 70, out of which, 55 are teaching staff.

== Curriculum ==
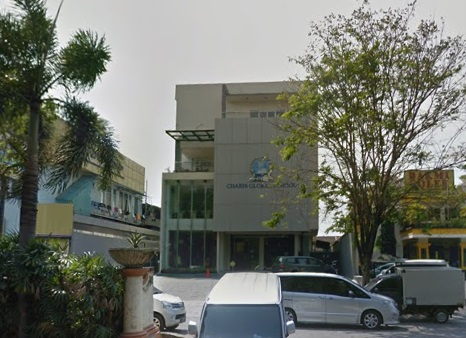
CGS main building in Lippo Cikarang

Charis Global School follows the National Curriculum prescribed by the Indonesian Ministry of Education and Culture in Primary and Secondary levels, and also adopts the Singapore education curriculum for English-based subjects such as Math, Science, English Language as well as Mandarin.

The school uses a wide range of teaching and learning methods to promote effective and engaged learning. For example, students are engaged in project-based learning. They also put up presentations to share their learning with their peers.

The school encourages participation in competitions, such as Singapore and Asian Schools Math Olympiads (SASMO), American Mathematics Olympiads (AMO), National Science Olympiad (OSN), etc.

== Notable achievements ==
Key	Winner	Runner-up	Third Place	Finalist

Year	Level	Competitions	Achievements
2014	Primary	Sakamoto Competition Matematika Beregu	6th position
2015	Primary	English Story Telling Competition	Runner-up (1)
2015	Primary	English Story Telling Competition	Third Place (2)
2015	Primary	Marshall Cavendish Books – Mentari Books English Writing Competition	Top 20 Entries; Final Round
2015	Primary	EF National Try Out English Competition	The Winner
2015	Primary	American Mathematic Olympiads	3 Silver
2015	Primary	American Mathematic Olympiads	3 Bronze
2015	Primary	Singapore and Asian Schools Math Olympiads	1 Gold
2015	Primary	Singapore and Asian Schools Math Olympiads	2 Silver
2015	Primary	Singapore and Asian Schools Math Olympiads	4 Bronze
2016	Primary	National Science Olympiad(OSN)	District Winner
2016	Primary	Reading, writing & Numeracy (Calistung) Bekasi district Competition	Finalist
2016	Junior High	President University English Speech Competition	Third Place
2017	Primary	Singapore & Asian Schools Math Olympiads	2 Silver
2017	Primary	Singapore & Asian Schools Math Olympiads	4 Bronze
2017	Primary	National Science Olympiad(OSN) Mathematics Competition	Sub-district Winner
2018	Kindergarten	World Mathematics Invitational KINDERGARTEN level	1 Bronze
2018	Primary	World Mathematics Invitational PRIMARY level	5 Silver
2018	Primary	World Mathematics Invitational PRIMARY level	3 Bronze
2018	Junior High	World Mathematics Invitational SECONDARY level	1 Bronze
2018	Primary	Asia International Mathematical Olympiad (AIMO) Grade 3, 4, 5, and 6	1 Gold
2018	Primary	Asia International Mathematical Olympiad (AIMO) Grade 3, 4, 5, and 6	15 Silver
2018	Primary	Asia International Mathematical Olympiad (AIMO) Grade 3, 4, 5, and 6	4 Bronze
2018	Junior High	Asia International Mathematical Olympiad (AIMO) Grade 7 and Grade 8	1 Silver
2018	Junior High	Asia International Mathematical Olympiad (AIMO) Grade 7 and Grade 8	3 Bronze
