= Siloam Hospitals =

Indonesian group network of hospitals

PT Siloam International Hospitals Tbk
- Type: Public
- Traded as: IDX: SILO
- Industry: Healthcare
- Founded: 27 August 1996; 29 years ago
- Headquarters: Tangerang, Indonesia
- Area served: Indonesia
- Key people: Ketut Budi Wijaya
- Owner: Lippo Group
- Number of employees: 12,700 (2021)
- Website: www.siloamhospitals.com

PT Siloam International Hospitals Tbk or Siloam Hospitals is a chain of healthcare facilities in Indonesia founded in 1996 by PT. Lippo Karawaci Tbk. It is a publicly listed company which is part of Lippo Group.

== History ==
It was established on 3 August 1996, as Siloam Gleneagles Hospital that was a collaboration between Lippo Group and Gleneagles Hospital, founded through PT Sentralindo Wirasta which is engaged in health services. The Siloam Gleneagles Hospital was first built in Lippo Village and Lippo Cikarang.

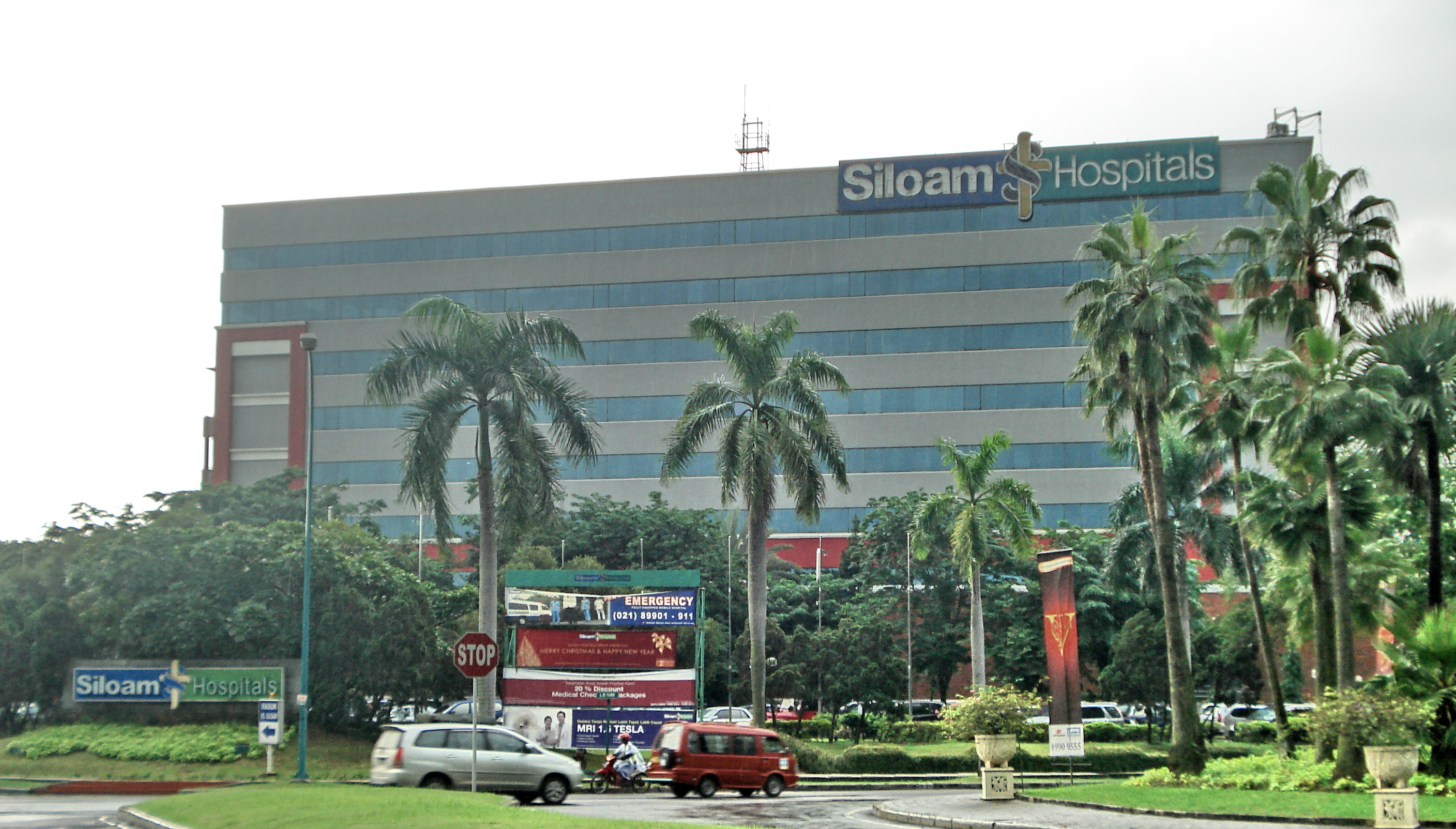
Siloam Hospital at Lippo Cikarang

Siloam is now one of the largest hospital chain in Indonesia. As of July 2024, the chain operates 41 Siloam hospitals across 23 provinces of Indonesia and 30 Siloam clinics (6 in Papua). Siloam is the first hospital in Indonesia to receive an accreditation by the Joint Commission International (JCI) from the United States. Siloam has achieved several significant medical milestones. Siloam ASRI successfully performed its 100th kidney transplant. The Siloam Hospital Group also received the World Stroke Organization (WSO) award for excellence in stroke care.

Siloam Hospitals Group also operates Mochtar Riady Institute of Nanotechnology (MRIN) and the Pelita Harapan University School of Medicine and School of Nursing.

In 2025, Siloam Hospitals was ranked 24th globally in the Healthcare & Life Sciences category of Newsweek's World's Most Trustworthy Companies 2025, the only Indonesian healthcare company to appear in the ranking, which surveyed 65,000 participants across 20 countries.
