= Astro Aruna =

Indonesian-language television network

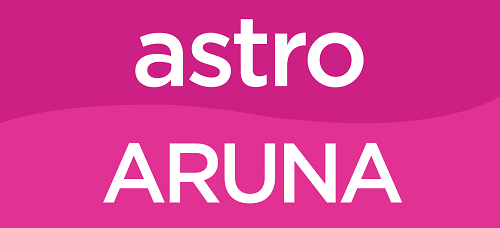
- Country: Malaysia (31 August 2006 – 1 February 2010); Brunei (31 August 2006 – 1 February 2010); Indonesia (15 June 2006 – 20 October 2008); Singapore (1 January 2005 – 1 October 2012)
- Broadcast area: Malaysia (31 August 2006 – 1 February 2010); Brunei (31 August 2006 – 1 February 2010); Indonesia (15 June 2006 – 20 October 2008); Singapore (1 January 2005 – 1 October 2012)
- Headquarters: Bukit Jalil, Kuala Lumpur, Malaysia (2006 – 2010); Bandar Seri Begawan, Brunei (2006 – 2010); Jakarta, Indonesia (2006 – 2008); Singapore (2005 – 2012)

Programming
- Languages: Malay (1 January 2005 – 1 October 2012); Indonesian (15 June 2006 – 1 February 2010)
- Picture format: 480i/576i (SDTV) 16:9 4:3

Ownership
- Owner: Astro All Asia Networks; Singapore Telecommunications
- Sister channels: Astro Ria; Astro Prima; Astro Oasis; Astro Awani; Astro Bella; Astro Ceria; Astro Citra; Astro hitz Astro Warna

History
- Launched: 1 January 2005
- Founder: Ananda Krishnan; James Riady; Djenar Maesa Ayu
- Closed: 1 October 2012 (7 years, 274 days)
- Replaced by: Bintang (Brunei, Malaysia); Pelangi (Brunei, Malaysia); Astro Prima (Singapore - Mio TV)

Links
- Website: www.astro.com.my

Astro Aruna was a 24-hour Indonesian language pay television network that was available on the Astro satellite television service from 2005. The last of its transmissions ended almost eight years later in 2012.

Indonesian dramas and soaps were popular on this network, and they were broadcast around the clock. All of the Indonesian shows on Astro Aruna were produced by SinemArt, Diwangkara Film, E-Motion Entertainment, Frame Ritz, Indika Entertainment, Karnos Film, Kharisma Starvision Plus, MD Entertainment, Mizan Productions, Prima Entertainment, Rapi Films, Screenplay Productions, Soraya Intercine Films, Tripar Multivision Plus and Verona Pictures. It was the only television network to broadcast entirely in the Indonesian language at the time.

== History ==
=== Opening ===
==== Singapore on StarHub TV ====
Astro Aruna was launched from StarHub TV a subsidiary of StarHub on channel 83 in Singapore on 1 January 2005. It was launched from Astro Nusantara on channel 40 in Indonesia on 15 June 2006 and from Astro on channel 121 in Malaysia and Brunei (Kristal-Astro) on 31 August 2006 in Malaysia and Brunei. Later, Astro Aruna was launched from Mio TV a subsidiary of Singapore Telecommunications on channel 35 in Singapore on 6 October 2008.

=== Closing ===
Astro Aruna ceased transmission from StarHub TV a subsidiary of StarHub on Channel 83 in Singapore on 31 March 2007. It was replaced by Astro Prima from 1 October 2012 on Singtel mio TV Channel 602. Astro Aruna ceased transmission from Astro Nusantara on channel 40 in Indonesia on 20 October 2008. It ceased transmission from Astro in Malaysia and Brunei (Kristal-Astro) on 1 February 2010.

== Programming Line Up ==
=== 2005-2006 ===
- Love in Bombay (Indosiar, 2002-2003)
- Flamboyan 108 (Indosiar, 1996-1997)
- Permata Hati (SCTV, 2001)
- Kasmaran (SCTV, 2000)
- Abad 21 (Indosiar, 1996-1997)
- Bukan Perempuan Biasa (RCTI, 1997)
- Kecupan Kangen (RCTI, 2006)
- Permataku
- Sang Bintang
- Cantik
- Terlanjur Sayang
- Bunga di Tepi Jalan (RCTI, 2005-2006)
- Pernikahan Dini (RCTI, 2001-2002)
- Cinta Tiada Akhir (SCTV, 2005-2006)
- Sephia (SCTV, 2002)
- Siapa Takut Jatuh Cinta (SCTV, 2002)
- Bukan Cinderella (SCTV, 2003-2004)
- Malam Pertama (SCTV, 2003-2004)
- Liontin (RCTI, 2005-2006)
- Bintang (RCTI, 2006)
- Inikah Rasanya? (SCTV, 2004-2006)
- Bintang Di Surga
- Bayangan Adinda (SCTV, 2003-2004)
- Buah Hati yang Hilang (MNCTV, 2001-2002)
- Gadis Mencari Cinta (RCTI, 2003)
- Dua Cinta
- Bumi dan Langit
- Satu Hati Satu Cinta
- Fitri Buah Hatiku
- Hati ini Milikmu
- Nyanyian Cinta
- Doaku Harapanku 1 (RCTI, 1998-1999)
- Doaku Harapanku 2 (RCTI, 1999-2000)
- Doa Membawa Berkah (Indosiar, 2000)
- Nyanyian Cinta
- Wah Cantiknya (SCTV, 2001-2002)
- Bidadari (RCTI, 2000-2005)
- Si Cecep (SCTV, 2003-2004)
- Mutiara Hati (SCTV, 2005-2006)

=== 2007 ===
- Cinta Tanpa Logika
- Akhir Cinta
- Tabir Tiga Gadis
- Ibu
- Ruang Hati
- Semusim
- Amara
- Menanti Surga
- Salah Mencinta
- Dunia Belum Kiamat
- Nyonya Nyonya Sosilita
- Hati ini Milikmu
- Cinta Dua Dunia
- Perempuan
- Api Cinta
- Pereumpuan
- Sejuta Rasa Sayang

=== 2008-2010, 2010-2012 ===
- Karena Cinta
- Elegi
- 1:3
- Rahasia Gadis
- Serpihan
- Jinny oh Jinny (RCTI, 1997-2002)
- Jin & Jun (RCTI, 1996-2002)
- Tuyul & Mbak Yul (RCTI, 1997-2002)
- Al Kausar (Tayangan Serentak di Astro Prima dan Astro Oasis)
- Pesantren Cinta
- Salah Mencinta
- Janjiku (RCTI, 1997)
- Cinta Di Awal Tiga Puluh (Indosiar, 1998)
- Cintailah Daku (SCTV, 1998)
- Cinta Dara Kembar (RCTI, 1998)
- Cinta (RCTI, 1999)
- Jangan Ucapkan Cinta (RCTI, 1999-2000)
- Janji Hati (SCTV, 1999-2000)
- Cinta Tak Pernah Salah (RCTI, 2000-2001)
- Maha Pengasih (SCTV, 2001)
- Titipan Ilahi (Indosiar, 2004)
- Senandung Masa Puber (Trans TV, 2003-2004)
- Halusinasi
- Cinta Seorang Ayah
- Ia Yang Terindah
- Cowok Cantik
- Sandra
- IQ Cowok Gue
- Loni Cantik Maukah
- Ancur Banget
- Kamu Jadi Pacarku
- Gengsi Gede-gedean (Indosiar, 2003-2005)
- Untung Ada Jinny (antv, 2004-2005)
- Panji Manusia Millenium (RCTI, 1999-2001)
- Indera ke-6 (RCTI, 2001-2002)
- Ibu Untuk Anakku
- Mentari
- Suami-Suami Takut Istri (Trans TV, 2007-2010)
- ABG (RCTI, 2002-2004)
- Roman Picisan
- Mewarnai Langit
- Pacar Pilihan
- Wah Cantiknya 2 (SCTV, 2002)
- Tersanjung 1-6 (Indosiar, 1998-2006)
- Cinderella Pulang Pagi
- Cinta Indah 1-2
- Mukjizat Allah
- Keajaban Cinta
- Cinta & Coklat
- Satu Hati Satu Cinta
- Angin Tak Dapat Membaca (RCTI, 1996-1997)
- Mengappai Mimpi
- Senyuman Anda
- Tangisan Anak Tiri
- Superfone (SCTV, 2005)
- Bonekka Poppy (SCTV, 2001-2002)
- Mat Jiung
- Terajana
- Inikah Cinta
- Lukisan Jiwa
- Tawakal (Indosiar, 2005)
- Indahnya Karuniamu (Indosiar, 2007)
- Mata ke Tiga
- Hitam Putih
- Sweet 17
- Air mata Ibu (RCTI, 1998)
- Setinggi Bintang
- M-Club
- Tanpa Saksi Mata (RCTI, 2003)
- Gadis Mencari Cinta (RCTI, 2003)
- Sakaratul Maut (antv, 2005)
- Cinta Fitri Season 1 (on MediaCorp TV12 Suria)
- Cinta Fitri Season 2 (on MediaCorp TV Channel 5)
- Cinta Fitri Season 3 (on Sensasi)
- Cinta Fitri Season Ramadhan
- Cinta Fitri seasons 5-7 (on MediaCorp TV Channel 5)
- Hikmah 1 (RCTI, 2003)
- Hikmah 2 (on MediaCorp TV12 Suria) (RCTI, 2004)
- Hikmah 3 (on Sensasi) (RCTI, 2005)
- Tuyul Millenium (SCTV, 2002-2003)
- Senandung Masa Puber (Trans TV, 2003-2004)
- Arung dan Si Kaya (ANTV, 2005)
- Metropolis (RCTI, 2002-2003)
- Rahasia Gadis
- Anak & Ibuku (Indosiar, 2000-2001)
- Senandung (Indosiar, 2000-2001)
- Kapuk Wingi
- Begu Jagang
- Kiamat Nya Robeng
- Ratu Parasik
- Misteri Tawan Karib
- Dewa (RCTI, 2010-2011)
- Kepompong (SCTV, 2008-2009)
- Mutiara Hati (SCTV, 2005-2006)
- Arti Sahabat (Indosiar, 2010) (Tayangan Serentak di Astro Prima dan TV9 (Malaysia))
- Buku Harian Baim (SCTV, 2010)
- Asmara
- Anugerah (RCTI, 2011)
- Yusra dan Yumna (RCTI, 2010)
- Putri yang Ditukar (RCTI, 2010-2011)
- Dia Jantung Hatiku (RCTI, 2010-2011)
- Pesantren & Rock n' Roll (SCTV, 2011)
- Garuda Impian (SCTV, 2011)
- Calon Bini (SCTV, 2011)
- 2 Dewi
- Ku Pinang Kau Dengan Bismillah (SCTV, 2011)
- Janji Cinta Aisha (SCTV, 2011)
- Putih Abu-Abu (SCTV, 2012)
- Anissa dan Anissa
- Cinta Salsabilla
- Badil & Blangkon Ajaib (SCTV, 2012)
- Otomatis Jatuh Cinta
- Aliya (SCTV, 2011-2012)
- Cahaya Gemilang (SCTV, 2012)
- Dia Atau Diriku (SCTV, 2012)
- Gol Gol Fatimah (SCTV, 2012)
- Baim Jaim (SCTV, 2012)
- Tukang Bubur Naik Haji The Series (Indonesia) (Tayangan Serentak di Astro Prima)

== Broadcast rights ==
Territory	Broadcaster	Channel	Launched	Closed
Brunei	Kristal-Astro	121	31 August 2006	1 February 2010
Indonesia	Astro Nusantara	40	15 June 2006	20 October 2008
Malaysia	Astro	121	31 August 2006	1 February 2010
Singapore	StarHub TV	83	1 January 2005	31 March 2007
Singapore	mio TV	35	6 October 2008	2 October 2012
