= Meikarta =

Planned city in Indonesia

Coordinates: 6.338°S 107.171°E

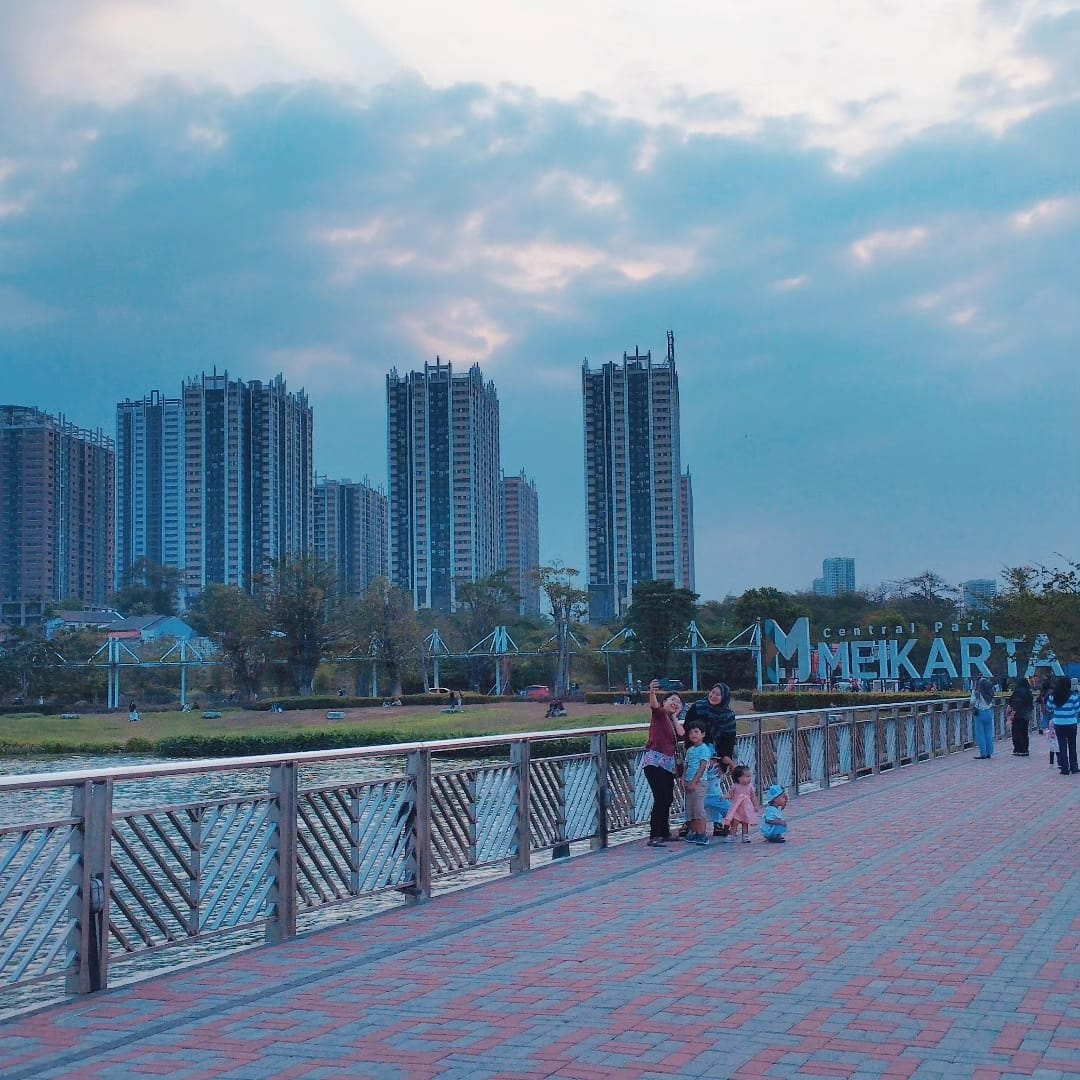
Meikarta Tower District

Meikarta is a planned city project in Indonesia, which is aimed to become a modern city of international scale. The township is being developed by PT Lippo Karawaci Tbk in Cikarang, Bekasi Regency. The township has land area of about 500 hectares. The project was officially launched on 17 August 2017. The project is located on the Jakarta-Cikampek Toll Road. Meikarta expects to serve as the residential area of other industrial estates in Cikarang region such as Kota Jababeka and MM2100. Total investment for development of the township is about Rp 278 trillion (US$21.11 billion).

== Planned facilities ==
Other than residential facilities, the township will have business district, hospital, hotels, international and national schools, universities, IT hub, industrial research center, international exhibition center, stadium, library, art center, and shopping malls. The project consist of 200 skyscrapers, which will cost about $30 billion. At first phase 84 towers of residential towers will be built, each of which will be 42-story. In the first phase of the development there will be 250,000 apartment units which can accommodate up to 1 million people.

The township has 100-hectare central park, which is claimed to be the largest park in Indonesia. There is a lake spreading over 25-hectares in the park. There will be a botanical garden and a zoo, which each will have 25 hectares of land. The remaining space around the lake will be kept open for sporting activities, as a meeting point and a playground.

Orange County is the CBD of Meikarta. It will have 12 apartment towers, 1 iconic tower as high as 61 floors with 5 star hotel, offices and service apartments.

Meikarta has claimed to have connection with the Jakarta-Bandung high speed rail, though the closest station is Karawang HSR Station which is located in neighboring Karawang Regency.

== Controversy ==
It reaped protests from several parties, including the House of Representatives of the Republic of Indonesia, Indonesian Consumer Institution Foundation (YLKI) and Deputy Governor of West Java Deddy Mizwar because it lacks necessary permission. As of December 2018, the project is under investigation by Corruption Eradication Commission (KPK) due to the alleged gratification from the developer to Bekasi regent for the land permit. Neneng Hassanah Yasin, the Bupati regent at that time, has been arrested after being accused to receive Rp 13 billion from a Lippo Group executive. Billy Sindoro, a Lippo Group executive, has also been arrested for the case. The CEO of the company, James Riady, has also been questioned by the KPK for his role in the case. As of December 2018, the trial is still ongoing for the suspects.

Despite the case, the developer is still continuing the construction of the project and continues to market the property in festivals and in shopping malls.

== See also ==
- Lippo Cikarang
