= Johnny Huang =

Johnny Huang may refer to:

- Wenguan Johnny Huang (born 1962), Chinese-born Canadian table tennis player
- Huang Jingyu (born 1992), Chinese actor

== See also ==
- John Huang (born 1945), Chinese-born American criminal and fundraiser for the Democratic National Committee
