= Al-Imtizaj Mosque =

Mosque in Bandung, West Java, Indonesia

- Masjid Al-Imtizaj
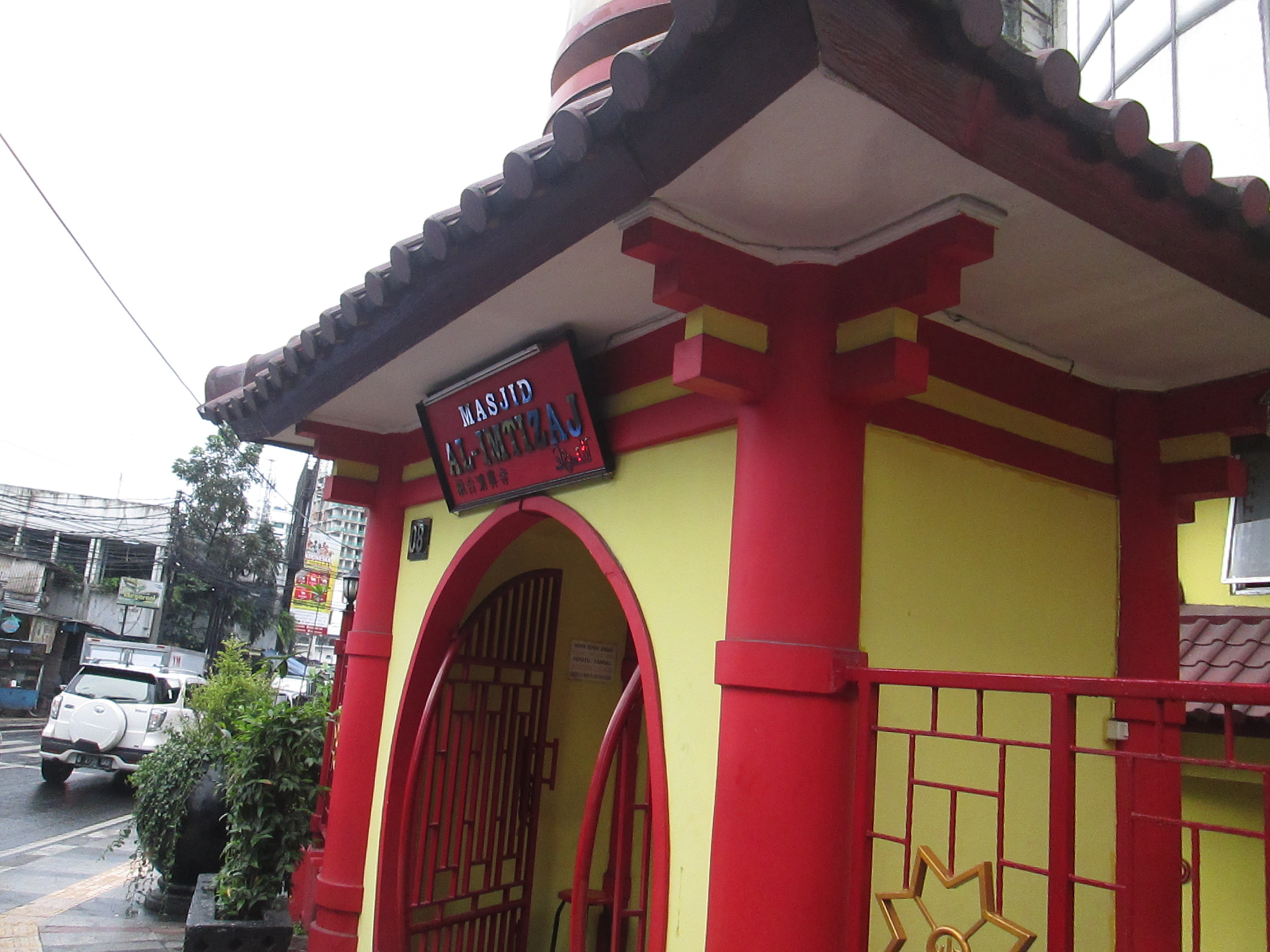

- Location within Bandung

Religion
- Affiliation: Islam
- Branch/tradition: Sunni

Location
- Location: Bandung, West Java, Indonesia
- Interactive map of Al-Imtizaj Mosque
- Coordinates: 6°55′10.0″S 107°36′28.3″E

Architecture
- Type: mosque
- Style: Chinese
- Established: 6 August 2010
- Groundbreaking: 2008
- Completed: 2010
- Capacity: 200 worshippers

The Al-Imtizaj Mosque (Indonesian: Masjid Al-Imtizaj) is a mosque in Bandung, West Java, Indonesia.

== History ==
The establishment of the mosque was proposed by West Java former Governor R. Nuriana. A former Matahari department store was chosen to be the site for the mosque. The construction then started in 2008 and completed in 2010. The official opening of the mosque was held on 6 August 2010.

== Architecture ==
The mosque was constructed in Chinese architecture style. It is housed in building with red, golden and yellow colors. The front part of the mosque stands a 5-meter high paifang. It consists of two floors and has a capacity of 200 worshippers.

== Transportation ==
The mosque is accessible within walking distance south east of Bandung Station of Kereta Api Indonesia.

== See also ==
- List of mosques in Indonesia
