= BDMNTN-XL =

Professional sports league

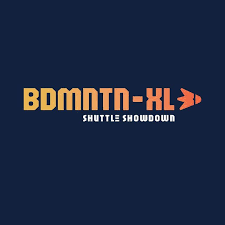
- Sport: Badminton
- First season: 2024; 2 years ago
- No. of teams: 4 (2024)
- Most recent champion: Hurricanes (2025)

BDMNTN-XL (pronounced “Badminton-Excel” and often referred to as BXL) is an international badminton tournament organised by Eclat Media Group and SPOTV Media. The inaugural event was held in Jakarta, Indonesia, in October 2024.

== History ==
According to SPOTV Media CEO Lee Choong Khay, the idea to deliver a unique and innovative badminton experience for players and fans came about in 2023.

A launch press conference with Indonesian badminton icons Hendra Setiawan and Fajar Alfian in attendance was held on 25 September 2024 in Jakarta and a prize pool of nearly US$1,000,000 was announced for the inaugural edition.

It first took place at Istora Gelora Bung Karno from October 31 to November 3, 2024, starring the likes of back-to-back Olympic gold medalist Viktor Axelsen, 2023 BWF World Championships men's singles champion Kunlavut Vitidsarn, South Korean badminton legend Lee Yong-dae and Malaysian men's doubles pair Aaron Chia and Soh Wooi Yik among its star-studded line-up. Blitzers defeated Hurricanes in the first-ever finals.

== Competition format ==
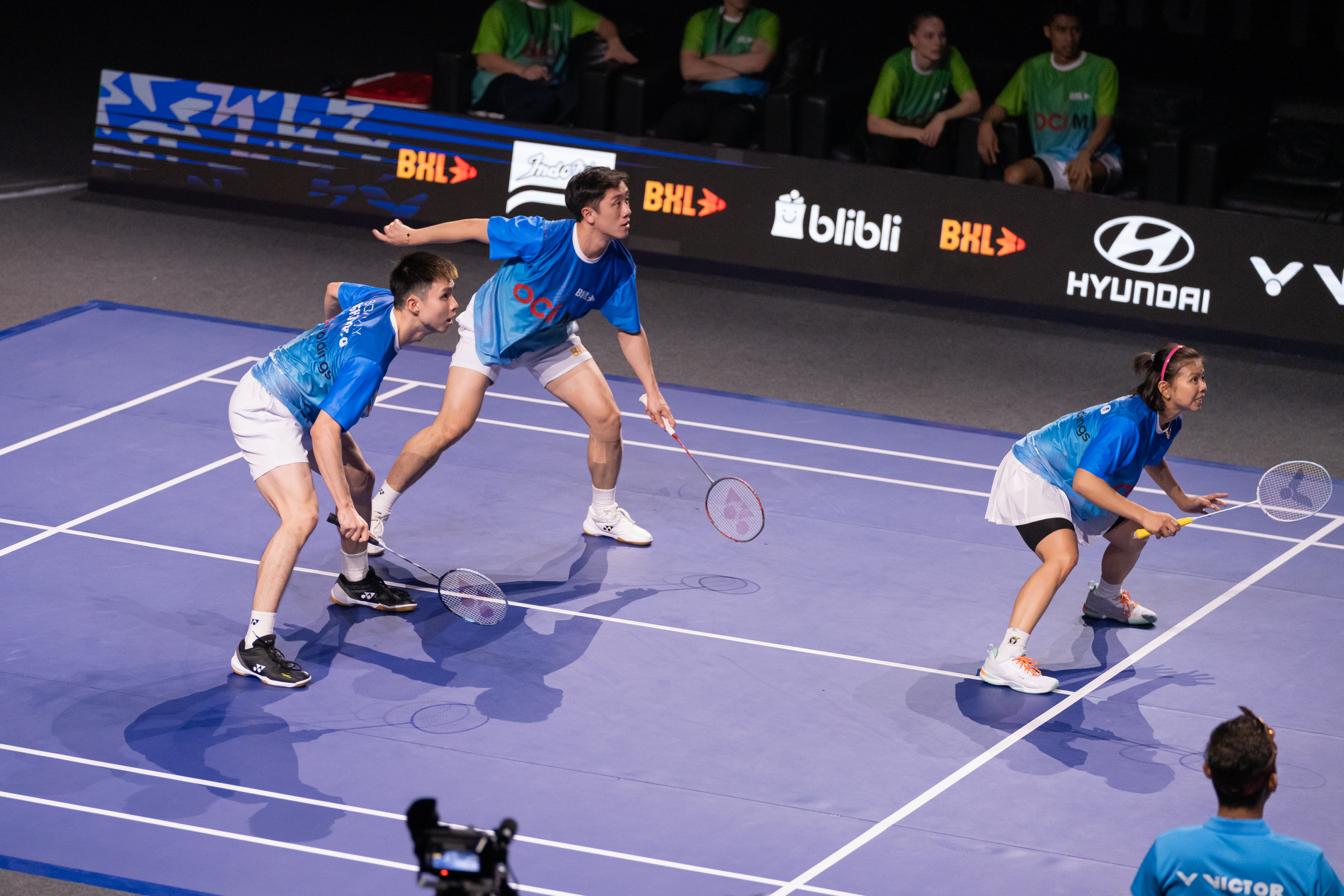
Soh Wooi Yik, Tang Chun Man & Greysia Polii in 3x3 action

BDMNTN-XL is a team tournament featuring badminton players from around the world to compete in several categories, with 3x3 being the standout.

Unlike a regular badminton match, each category is played over four sets with a time limit and there are no minimum or maximum points required. If a match is tied at 2–2, a sudden-death tiebreaker known as the Shuttle Showdown is played. Whoever reaches 2–0 or 3–1 first in the Shuttle Showdown wins the deciding set and the category.

The winning objective of a tie between teams is to collect a minimum of five points.

The four teams play each other in a single-round robin format, with the top two teams advancing and facing off in the finals.

	Previous Format (2024)	Enhanced Format (2025 onward)
Number of Teams	4 (Blitzers, Hurricanes, Lightning, Rockets)	Unchanged
Number of Players	28 (4 male & 3 female each)	32 (4 male & 4 female each)
Categories	MS, WS, MD, WD, 3x3	MS, WS, 3x3 (twice)
Games	4 x 10-minute games	4 x 8-minute games
3x3 Player Substitution	Between games	Anytime
Scoring System	No minimum/maximum points per game. A game is played to the buzzer.	No minimum/maximum points per game. If a game score has a margin of 3 or fewer at the buzzer, the Pressure Point is activated, requiring the leading side to win one more point to win the game.
Tiebreaker (Shuttle Showdown)	If a match is tied at 2-2, the Shuttle Showdown (first to 2-0 or 3-1) is played.	Unchanged
BXL Points	3x3 = 3 points Any two categories picked by respective teams = 2 points each Remaining categories = 1 point each The first to 5 points wins the tie.	3x3 = 3 points MS & WS = 1 point each The first to 5 points wins the tie.
Ultimate Shuttle Showdown	-	If a tie ends on equal points, a MS or WS match is played (first to 5 points) to determine the winning team of the tie.

== Reception ==
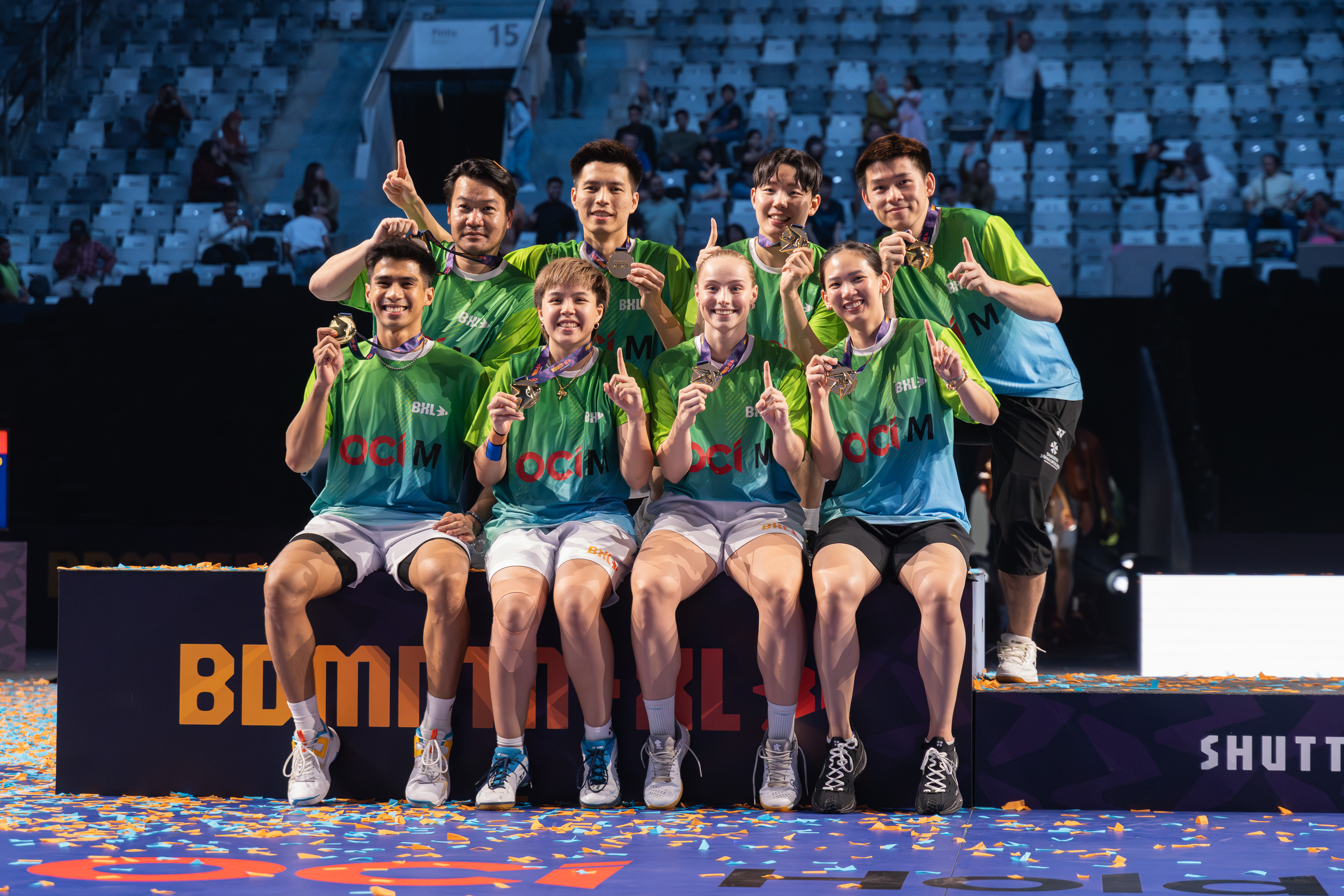
Jakarta 2024 champions Blitzers (from left to right, top to bottom): Phattapol Ngernsrisuk (coach), Ong Yew Sin, Seo Seung-jae, Kunlavut Vitidsarn; Sabar Karyaman Gutama, Toh Ee Wei, Alexandra Bøje, Pornpawee Chochuwong

Viktor Axelsen said he enjoyed being able to compete and entertain fans at the same time.

Aaron Chia hailed the 3x3 category for being “interesting, fun and fast”.

Hendra Setiawan praised the Shuttle Showdown tiebreaker as an exciting concept.

2010 Commonwealth Games women's doubles champion Ashwini Ponnappa called it “a fun badminton event”.

Former Malaysian shuttler Tan Boon Heong said it was “a breakaway from the traditional game” and “good for the sport”.

== Results ==
Edition	Year	Dates	Host City	Winner	Score	Runner-Up
I	2024	October 31-November 3	Jakarta, Indonesia	Blitzers	7-2	Hurricanes
II	2025	October 2 - 5	Jakarta, Indonesia	Hurricanes	7-1	Rockets

== Players ==
**Bold**	Indicates the winning team of an edition

Player	Total Appearance(s)	2024 Jakarta	2025 Jakarta
(Canada) Michelle Li	1	-	Blitzers
(Denmark) Alexandra Bøje	2	**Blitzers**	Rockets
(Denmark) Mathias Christiansen	2	Hurricanes	**Hurricanes**
(Denmark) Mia Blichfeldt	1	-	Rockets
(Denmark) Viktor Axelsen	2	Lightning	Lightning
(Hong Kong) Lee Cheuk Yiu	2	Hurricanes	Rockets
(Hong Kong) Tang Chun Man	1	Lightning	-
(Hong Kong) Tse Ying Suet	2	Rockets	Lightning
(India) Ashwini Ponnappa	1	Lightning	-
(India) Chirag Shetty	1	-	Blitzers
(India) Rutaparna Panda	1	-	Lightning
(India) Swetaparna Panda	1	-	Rockets
(India) Treesa Jolly	1	-	**Hurricanes**
(Indonesia) Anthony Sinisuka Ginting	1	-	**Hurricanes**
(Indonesia) Apriyani Rahayu	1	-	Blitzers
(Indonesia) Fajar Alfian	1	-	Lightning
(Indonesia) Gloria Emanuelle Widjaja	2	Hurricanes	**Hurricanes**
(Indonesia) Greysia Polii	1	Lightning	-
(Indonesia) Hendra Setiawan	1	Rockets	-
(Indonesia) Jonatan Christie	1	-	Blitzers
(Indonesia) Melati Daeva Oktavianti	1	-	Rockets
(Indonesia) Muhammad Reza Pahlevi Isfahani	1	-	**Hurricanes**
(Indonesia) Muhammad Rian Ardianto	1	-	Rockets
(Indonesia) Sabar Karyaman Gutama	2	**Blitzers**	Blitzers
(Indonesia) Siti Fadia Silva Ramadhanti	1	-	**Hurricanes**
(Japan) Aya Ohori	1	Hurricanes	-
(Japan) Kodai Naraoka	2	Rockets	Rockets
(Japan) Misaki Matsutomo	2	Rockets	Blitzers
(Japan) Yuta Watanabe	2	Lightning	Lightning
(Malaysia) Aaron Chia	1	Hurricanes	-
(Malaysia) Chen Tang Jie	1	Rockets	-
(Malaysia) Goh Sze Fei	1	-	**Hurricanes**
(Malaysia) Lai Pei Jing	1	-	Blitzers
(Malaysia) Nur Izzuddin Rumsani	1	-	Lightning
(Malaysia) Ong Yew Sin	2	**Blitzers**	Blitzers
(Malaysia) Shevon Jemie Lai	1	-	Lightning
(Malaysia) Soh Wooi Yik	1	Lightning	-
(Malaysia) Teo Ee Yi	2	Hurricanes	Rockets
(Malaysia) Toh Ee Wei	1	**Blitzers**	-
(Netherlands) Selena Piek	1	Hurricanes	-
(Scotland) Kirsty Gilmour	1	-	**Hurricanes**
(Singapore) Yeo Jia Min	1	Rockets	-
(South Korea) Lee Yong-dae	1	Rockets	-
(South Korea) Seo Seung-jae	1	**Blitzers**	-
(Thailand) Kunlavut Vitidsarn	1	**Blitzers**	-
(Thailand) Pornpawee Chochuwong	1	**Blitzers**	-
(Thailand) Ratchanok Intanon	1	Lightning	-
(Vietnam) Nguyen Thuy Linh	1	-	Lightning

Captain	Total Appearance(s)	2024 Jakarta	2025 Jakarta
(Indonesia) Greysia Polii	1	-	Lightning
(Indonesia) Hendra Setiawan	1	-	Blitzers
(Indonesia) Flandy Limpele	2	Lightning	**Hurricanes**
(Indonesia) Vita Marissa	2	Rockets	Rockets
(Malaysia) Rosman Razak	1	Hurricanes	-
(Thailand) Phattapol Ngernsrisuk	1	**Blitzers**	-

== Broadcasters ==
Edition	Broadcasting Territory
Jakarta 2024	Indonesia (MNC Vision, K Vision, First Media, Vidio, IndiHome), Malaysia (Astro, Unifi TV), Philippines (SkyCable, Cignal), Singapore (Singtel TV, StarHub TV), Thailand (TrueVisions), Vietnam (MyTV), South Korea (SPOTV), Hong Kong (PCCW), Macau (Macau Cable TV), Denmark (TV 2)
Jakarta 2025	Indonesia (MNC Vision, K Vision, First Media, Vidio, IndiHome), Malaysia (Astro, Unifi TV), Philippines (SkyCable, Cignal), Singapore (Singtel TV, StarHub TV), Thailand (TrueVisions), Vietnam (MyTV), South Korea (SPOTV), Macau (Macau Cable TV), Unbeaten (Rest of the World)
