= Melitha Sidabutar =

Indonesian singer (2001–2024)

- Born: Melitha Patricia Sidabutar; 8 January 2001; Jakarta, Indonesia
- Died: 8 April 2024 (aged 23); Bekasi, West Java, Indonesia
- Resting place: San Diego Hills, Karawang, West Java, Indonesia
- Occupations: Singer; motivational speaker
- Years active: 2014–2024
- Musical career
- Instruments: Vocals

Melitha Patricia Sidabutar (8 January 2001 – 8 April 2024) was an Indonesian singer. She rose to prominence after appearing as a Top 12 Finalist on Indonesian Idol Junior in 2014 and Indonesian Idol with her twin sister Melisha Sidabutar in 2020.

== Life and career ==
Melitha Patricia Sidabutar was born on 8 January 2001 in Jakarta, Indonesia. She had a twin sister, Melisha and a brother, Ronald and Rinaldo. In 2014, she began her career as a singer and became famous after participating in the first season of Indonesian Idol Junior.

In 2020, Melitha Sidabutar joined the Christian music label, Impact Music Indonesia and released her debut single entitled "Penolong Yang Setia" in December 2020. Then in 2021, she released her debut mini album with the same title which was released in a live performance at the Jesus Center Church in Jakarta, in July 2021.

== Death ==
On 8 April 2024, at the age of 23, Melitha Sidabutar died of heart failure at Eka Hospital, Bekasi, West Java. She was buried side by side with her twin sister at San Diego Hills cemetery on 11 April 2024.

== Discography ==
Mini album

- Penolong Yang Setia - displays JCC Worship (2021)

Singles

- "Penolong Yang Setia" (2020)
- "Yesus Yang Kupercaya" (2021)
- "Kupercaya Mujizat Ada Bagiku" (2021)
- "Sampaikan Pada Yesus" (2021)
- "Sahabat Setia" (2021)
- "IkutMu" (2021)
- "Bapaku Yang Baik" (2022)
- "Mengucap Syukur" (2023)
- "Roh Kudus" (2023)
- "Kisah Indah" (2024)
- "Penolong Dalam Kesesakan" (2024)

== Awards and nominations ==
Year	Award	Category	Nominee(s)	Result	Ref.
2023	Anugerah Musik Indonesia 2023	Best Christian Music Production Work	"Mengucap Syukur"	Won	
2024	Anugerah Musik Indonesia 2024	Best Christian Music Production Work	"Penolong Dalam Kesesakan"	Won	
