= SPH Lippo Cikarang =

Sekolah Pelita Harapan Lippo Cikarang
- Lippo Cikarang; Indonesia

Information
- Type: Private, International
- Motto: True Knowledge, Faith in Christ, Godly Character
- Religious affiliation: Christian
- Established: 1995
- Enrollment: 300
- Average class size: 24 students
- Student to teacher ratio: 1:8
- Website: http://lippocikarang.sph.edu

Sekolah Pelita Harapan Lippo Cikarang (SPHLC) was founded in 1995 to provide an English, Christian-based, international curriculum to Indonesian and expatriate children from pre-school to grade 12. SPHLC offers an international program in English while retaining an emphasis on Indonesian language and culture. It is part of the Sekolah Pelita Harapan School (SPH) group.

SPH Lippo Cikarang was authorized as an IB World School in 2005 and a Cambridge International School in 2012.

== Curriculum ==
SPHLC uses Cambridge Primary (Grades 1 to 6), Secondary 1 (Grades 7 to 8), Cambridge IGCSE (Grades 9 and 10), and the International Baccalaureate Diploma Program (DP) in Grades 11 - 12.

Previously it was authorised to deliver the Primary Years Program (PYP) in Grades K - 6, but has since decided to change curriculum providers.

== Accreditation ==
SPHLC is accredited by the International Baccalaureate Organization, Christian Schools International (CSI), ACSI and Cambridge International.
