= Universitas Pelita Harapan Conservatory of Music =

Location
- Universitas Pelita Harapan Building B (Indonesia) Lippo Karawaci, Banten

Information
- Religious affiliation: Christian
- Established: 2000
- Dean: Kezia Karnila Putri, S.Sn., MMT, MTA, MT-BC
- Department Chair: Sarita Marcellina Wurangian, B.Mus, M.Pd.
- Faculty: 31 full time, 32 part time
- Website: https://www.uph.edu/study-at-uph/conservatory-of-music/

Universitas Pelita Harapan Conservatory of Music is a private conservatory and music school founded in 2000. It has operated as a division of the Pelita Harapan University of Banten, Indonesia, which was established in 1994 by Pelita Harapan Foundation (Indonesian: Yayasan Universitas Pelita Harapan or YUPH). The Conservatory of Music is at the Universitas Pelita Harapan Campus Building B, Lippo Village, Tangerang.

== Concentrations ==
There are 6 concentrations in the UPH Conservatory of Music and all of them carry a total of 145 credits hours of music courses ad liberal arts courses. An audition and a diagnostic interview are required in the admission process to each of these concentrations. The concentrations are (1) Classical Music Performance. (2) Jazz and Pop Music Performance. (3) Creative Music Composition. (4) Interdisciplinary Studies of Music Education & Therapy (ISMET). (5) Audio & Music Technology (AMT). (6) Music Industry Management (MIM).

== Notable faculty (past and present) ==
Tomislav Dimov, Vahur Luhtsalu, Johannes Sebastian Nugroho, Mario Santoso, Benny M. Tanto
