= Bintang =

Bintang may refer to:

- Bintang Beer, a brand of beer from Indonesia
- Bintang (TV channel), a Malay-language channel which broadcasts Indonesian programmes
- Former name of the Bintan Island
