= John Riady =

American businessman and academic

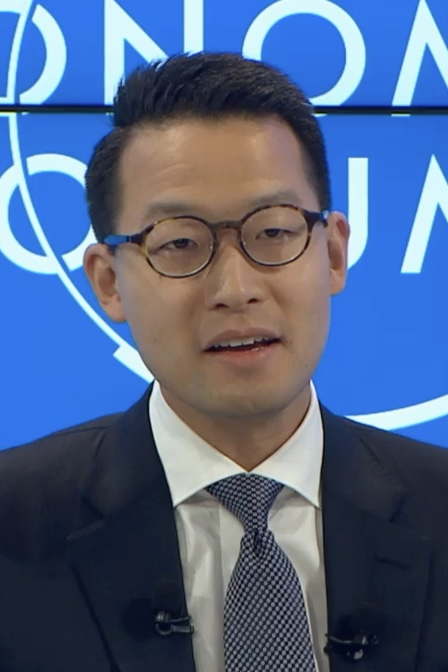
- Riady in 2017
- Born: May 5, 1985 (age 41); New York City, U.S.
- Education: Georgetown University; Wharton School of Business; Columbia Law School
- Occupation: CEO of Lippo Karawaci
- Spouse: Chew Xuan Wei (m. 2015)
- Children: Caleb Riady; Claire Riady; Grace Riady; Joshua Riady
- Parent(s): James Riady & Aileen Hambali

Chinese name
- Traditional Chinese: 李川
- Simplified Chinese: 李川
- Hanyu Pinyin: Li Chuān
Transcriptions
Standard Mandarin
- Hanyu Pinyin: Li Chuān

John Riady (Chinese: 李川; pinyin: Li Chuān; born 5 May 1985) is CEO of Lippo Karawaci and Director of the Lippo Group, an investment company controlled by the Riady family; Professor of Law at Universitas Pelita Harapan in Indonesia; Editor of the Jakarta Globe, an Indonesian English language newspaper founded in 2009; and Director of Berita Satu Media Holdings, an Indonesian media company.

== Early childhood and education ==
Born in New York City, Riady was educated at Georgetown University where he majored in Political Philosophy and Economics. He also received his MBA from the Wharton School of Business, University of Pennsylvania—graduating as a Palmer Scholar—and a Juris Doctor from Columbia University Law School. He is also a member of the NY Bar Association.

== Pro bono appointments ==
In 2012, the World Economic Forum appointed Riady to its Global Agenda Council. He is also on the Columbia University Law School International Advisory Board, and is Chairman of KIKAS-KADIN, the US-Indonesia Bilateral Committee within the Indonesian National Chamber of Commerce and Industry (KADIN).

== Riady family ==
John Riady is the grandson of Mochtar Riady. The family controls the Lippo Group, which manages companies in property, healthcare, financial services, retail, technology and education in Asia. Its investors include GIC and Temasek Holdings, the Singapore state investment funds, Mitsui; Khazanah, the Malaysian Sovereign Wealth fund; and CVC Capital Partners, a private equity firm which tripled its money in three years by working with Lippo on the buyout of their Matahari department store chain.

== Publications ==
Riady is a regular columnist on Indonesian social, political and foreign policy issues. Past publications include:

=== 2014 ===
- Jokowi’s Generational Leap, The Jakarta Globe, October 26, 2014.

=== 2013 ===
- Getting Reformasi Back on Track, The Jakarta Globe, November 21, 2013.
- Getting Ready for a Changing China, The Jakarta Globe, November 7, 2013
- Riady, John & Fukunaga, Yoshifumi. The Road to Bali: ERIA Perspectives on the WTO Ministerial and Asian Integration, ERIA Research Project Report 2012–13, November 2013.
- Recent Turbulence a Wake-Up Call, But No 1997 Crisis, The Malaysian Insider, September 4, 2013.
- Fifteen Years After Suharto, Indonesia Has Made Great Strides Forward, The Jakarta Globe, May 16, 2013.
- Riady, John. Nurturing the Life of the Mind, Strategic Review, July–September 2013.
- Jokonomics, Social Welfare and the Future of Indonesia, The Jakarta Globe, April 11, 2013.

=== 2012 ===
- Yale-NUS Pact Can Be a Learning Experience, Even for the Ivy League, Yale-NUS Blog, September 6, 2012.
- Let us Praise Our House Undivided on Indonesia's Independence Day, The Jakarta Globe, August 16, 2012.
- Honoring Indonesia's Generational Compact, While we Still Have Time, The Jakarta Globe, July 12, 2012.
- A Tribute to American Enterprise, The Jakarta Globe, July 5, 2012.
- Puddle to Pool: Deeper Asian Capital Markets Essential to Protect Growth, The Jakarta Globe, June 11, 2012.
- How Asean Engagement Led to Burma Reform, The Irrawaddy, June 5, 2012.
- Fixing inequality one egg at a time, The Jakarta Globe, May 4, 2012.
- Axis of Hostility: Iran, Israel and the US Continue Their Mad Rush Toward War, The Jakarta Globe, February 9, 2012.

=== 2011 ===
- In Protesting Economic Woes, Recall That Free Trade Makes the World a Safer Place, The Jakarta Globe, November 25, 2011.
- The rise of the Beijing consensus, The Jakarta Globe, November 6, 2011.
- The Arab World’s Spring Has Passed Into a Bitter Winter of Ruthlessness, The Jakarta Globe, August 22, 2011.
- Indonesian on the New Economic Map, The Jakarta Globe, July 31, 2011.
- In the new war of political ideologies, rational superpowers live and let live, The Jakarta Globe, July 3, 2011.
- Truth About Terrorism: The Harsh Reality About This Century’s Harshest Ideology, The Jakarta Globe, May 9, 2011.
- Indonesian Signs for an Egyptian Roadmap, The Jakarta Globe, March 25, 2011.
- Keeping gubernatorial elections in the hands of the people, The Jakarta Globe, January 31, 2011.
