= Pelangi =

Malaysian Indonesian-language TV channel

- Country: Malaysia
- Broadcast area: Malaysia
- Headquarters: Kuala Lumpur

Programming
- Language: Indonesian
- Picture format: 4:3 (SDTV)

Ownership
- Owner: Astro

History
- Launched: 11 July 2011
- Founder: Ananda Krishnan; James Riady; Djenar Maesa Ayu
- Closed: 1 June 2020 (Malaysia)
- Replaced by: Astro Rania
- Former names: Astro Aruna

Links
- Website: Astro Content Guide

Pelangi by Astro was a 24-hour Indonesian language channel which broadcast Indonesian films and dramas (as of 2011). This channel was only available on Astro in the Indo Pek package. Most of the programmes were available in Malay subtitle.

The channel was a collaboration between Astro and NET. from Indonesia, and as such, NET. programs comprises for 100% of the channel's contents.

== Indo Pek ==
Beginning 11 July 2011, Astro launched a new package named Indo Pek (meaning "Indo Pack" in English), which contains 2 new Astro channels, namely Bintang (Channel 141) Astro and Pelangi (Channel 142) Astro.

The channel broadcast the program from NET. TV and entire dramas has been move to Bintang. After nine years of broadcast, Pelangi and Bintang ceased broadcasting on 1 June 2020 at 12:00 am and was later replaced by Astro Rania HD (Channel 112) alongside Astro Aura HD (Channel 113), which began to operated since 23 May 2020.

== See also ==
- Bintang
- Astro (satellite television)
