= MPPA Retail Group =

Indonesian retail company

PT Matahari Putra Prima Tbk
- Trade name: MPPA Retail Group
- Company type: Public
- Traded as: IDX: MPPA
- ISIN: ID1000125909
- Industry: Retail
- Founded: 11 March 1986; 40 years ago
- Headquarters: Tangerang, Indonesia
- Number of locations: 222 (2013)
- Key people: John Bellis (Chairman); Bunjamin Jonatan Mailool (CEO)
- Brands: Hypermart; Foodmart; HyFresh; Primo Supermarket; Boston Health & Beauty; FMX; SmartClub
- Revenue: ▼IDR 1,889 Billion (2013)
- Operating income: ▲IDR 588 Billion (2013)
- Net income: ▲IDR 445 Billion (2013)
- Total assets: ▼IDR 6,580 Billion (2013)
- Total equity: ▼IDR 3,295 Billion (2013)
- Owners: PT Multipolar Tbk (50%); Prime Star Investment Pte. Ltd. (26%)
- Number of employees: 12,564 (2013)
- Website: www.mppa.co.id

PT Matahari Putra Prima Tbk (doing business as MPPA Retail Group) is an Indonesian retail chain that sells items for daily needs. The company operate its retail chain under the bulk of brands, such as Hypermart, Foodmart, HyFresh, Primo Supermarket, Boston Health & Beauty, Foodmart Xpress (FMX), and SmartClub.

== History ==
MPPA Retail Group was incorporated on 11 March 1986. The first Hypermart was opened in 2004 at Wahana Tata Cemerlang Mall in Lippo Karawaci, Tangerang. On December 19, 2014, Hypermart unveiled the new logo at the opening of the new Hypermart store with the new G7 concept at Cyberpark, North Lippo Karawaci, Tangerang. This logo was rolled out on their new and renovated existing Hypermart stores with the G7 concept throughout 2015 and still going on until present.

== Initial public offering ==
In December 1992, Matahari Hypermart listed its shares on the Jakarta Stock Exchange and the Surabaya Stock Exchange. These later merged and were renamed as the Indonesia Stock Exchange.

== Brands ==
=== Current ===
- Matahari Department Store
- Hypermart
- Foodmart
- Primo
- Hypermart
- Foodmart Xpress
- SmartClub Wholesale
- Maxx Kitchen
- Maxx Coffee
- Boston
- Superoti

=== Former ===
- Timezone - Management transferred to Lippo Karawaci
- Mega M - Renamed to Hypermart
- Galeria Department Store - High-end department store, discontinued in 2007
- Parisian Department Store - Luxury department store, discontinued in 2010
- Marks & Spencer - Sold to Mitra Adiperkasa
