= Bintang (TV channel) =

- Country: Malaysia
- Broadcast area: Malaysia

Programming
- Language: Indonesian
- Picture format: 4:3 (SDTV)

Ownership
- Owner: Astro
- Sister channels: Pelangi

History
- Launched: 11 July 2011
- Founder: Ananda Krishnan; James Riady; Djenar Maesa Ayu
- Replaced: Astro Aruna
- Closed: 1 June 2020 (Malaysia)
- Replaced by: Astro Aura

Links
- Website: www.astro.com.my/indopek

Bintang by Astro was a 24-hour Malay language channel which broadcasts Indonesian programmes. This channel was formerly called Astro Aruna, which was previously available on the Astro satellite television service. This channel is only available on Astro in the Indo Pek package. Most of the programmes are available in Malay subtitles.

The channel is a collaboration between Astro and Broadway Media from Indonesia, and as such, Broadway's programs comprise 80% of the channel's contents.

== Indo Pek ==
On 11 July 2011, Astro launched a new package named Indo Pek (means "Indo Pack" in English), which contains 2 new Astro channels named Bintang (Channel 141) and Pelangi (Channel 142).

The TV channel has a variety and lifestyle of Indonesia, such as reality shows, football league, music videos, celebrity gossip, and many more.

Previously the bintang by Astro's focus more Indonesia drama and movie and news and cartoon that move from Pelangi. After 9 years of broadcasting, Bintang and Pelangi has ended all operations on 2 June 2020 at 12:00 am and was later replaced by Astro Aura HD (Channel 113) alongside Astro Rania HD (Channel 112), which began to operate since 23 May 2020.

== See also ==
- Pelangi
- Astro (satellite television)
