= Sekolah Dian Harapan =

Indonesian school

Sekolah Dian Harapan is an international school in Lippo Karawaci, Banten, Jakarta, Daan Mogot, Manado, and Makassar (2003).

Sekolah Dian Harapan was established in 2003. Sekolah Dian Harapan is under the Yayasan Pendidikan Pelita Harapan group.
