= San Diego Hills =

Cemetery in West Java, Indonesia

- Interactive map of San Diego Hills

Details
- Established: January 2007
- Location: Karawang, West Java
- Country: Indonesia
- Coordinates: 6.359°S 107.266°E
- Type: Public
- Owned by: PT. Lippo Karawaci, Tbk
- Size: 502 hectares (1,240 acres)
- Website: www.sandiegohills.co.id

San Diego Hills is a privately owned cemetery in Indonesia owned by Lippo Land Club. Established in January 2007, San Diego Hills is the first cemetery in Indonesia that combines the elegant cemetery concept of Forest Lawn with Indonesian cultures. The cemetery became a kind of icon among members of Indonesia's high society.

== History ==
The development of San Diego Hills began by accident. Lands in West Karawang, West Java, owned by Lippo from the previous 20 years, were originally intended to be developed as industrial zones. Those plans were changed around 2001, when Mochtar Riady, the founder of Lippo Group, moved his parents' tomb from Malang, East Java to Karawang, which became the location of San Diego Hills. The tomb's relocation was due to the difficulty of getting to the tomb, as well as its unpleasant environment, consisting of rowdy people and beggars. A more secluded area was desired. Due to the successful relocation, Riady decided to build a more extensive, comfortable and well-equipped cemetery. This also benefited the government, which was facing a burial land shortage in the Jabodetabek area, because San Diego Hills stands on 500 acres. To build San Diego Hills, the Lippo Group brought an advisor from Forest Lawn Cemeteries in the United States. San Diego Hills also adapted the "Forest Lawn concept" of developing elegant cemeteries where visitors enjoyed visiting.

In June 2010, the cemetery received press coverage for it opulence. Bloomberg Business reported on its sports facilities, including a running track, its Italian restaurant La Colina, a small-scale replica of Istanbul's Blue Mosque and a man-made eight-hectare Lake of Angels that is open to visitors on rowboats. The article also noted that the facility also hosts wedding parties, and a dedicated helicopter landing which allowed rich Indonesians to bypass Jakarta's traffic jams.
