= Soedarpo Sastrosatomo =

Indonesian businessman and diplomat

- Born: 30 June 1920; Pangkalansusu, North Sumatra, Dutch East Indies
- Died: 22 October 2007 (aged 87); Jakarta, Indonesia
- Citizenship: Indonesian
- Occupations: Businessman, diplomat
- Known for: Founder of Bank Niaga
- Political party: Socialist Party of Indonesia

Soedarpo Sastrosatomo (30 June 1920 – 22 October 2007) was an Indonesian businessman, diplomat and journalist. He was the founder of Bank Niaga and the shipping firm Samudera Indonesia.

Originating from a Javanese family, Soedarpo was active in the Indonesian nationalist movement during his education and later became a press officer for the government. After some time as a diplomat in the United States, he started his own business of distribution and shipping, later expanding to financial services and eventually becoming one of the most successful businessmen in Indonesia.

== Early life and career ==
Soedarpo was born in Pangkalan Susu, in what is today Langkat Regency of North Sumatra on 30 June 1920, the seventh of nine siblings. He was of Javanese origins, and his father was a clerk for the civil administration of Dutch East Indies. When he was a child, his family moved to Medan, where he went to elementary school. Following his father's death in 1929, Soedarpo's family moved to Yogyakarta, where Soedarpo began his education at an Algemene Middelbare School. By the 1930s, he and his older brother Soebadio moved to Batavia where they enrolled in medical studies. During their time in Batavia, both siblings were active in liberal and radical Indonesian nationalist organizations, and were influenced by Sutan Sjahrir.

In 1943, the brothers and Soedjatmoko went directly to Sukarno to criticize his cooperation with the Japanese occupiers. Also in that year, he was expelled from the medical school after participating in protests against the requirement for students to attend daily Japanese flag raising ceremony and bowing towards Tokyo. After this, Soedarpo withdrew from politics for some time, though he remained in contact with Sjahrir.

== Post-independence ==
Following the proclamation of Indonesian independence, Soedarpo began to work at the Indonesian Ministry of Information's Foreign Section, due to his relative proficiency in English. He was noted as Indonesia's "first government PR officer". Later, he and Soedjatmoko was sent as an envoy from Sjahrir to Sukarno in a successful attempt to find and persuade the latter to allow the formation of a government led by a prime minister. In another occasion as an envoy, he convinced Sukarno to negotiate the 1946 Linggadjati Agreement.

Soedarpo joined the Indonesian Socialist Party upon its formation in 1948, and helped launch a Dutch-language weekly paper Het Inzicht in addition to working at English publication Voice of Indonesia. He also worked at the Ministry of Defence under Amir Sjarifudin. Soedarpo was sent to New York as a press officer in 1948 and he later became part of the Indonesian delegation at the 1949 Dutch-Indonesian Round Table Conference.

During his time in New York and later the Indonesian Embassy in Washington, D.C., aside from attempting to secure recognition of Indonesian sovereignty, Soedarpo was tasked with administering the Indonesian foreign exchange. He also became the Indonesian representative to the United Nations Security Council. He left diplomatic service in 1952.

== Business career ==
After returning from the United States, Soedarpo decided against working for the government and began working as a director in Zorro Corporation, a distributor company for Remington typewriters and RCA products owned by American Matthew Fox. While Zorro held monopoly rights for the distribution from the two companies, it failed to secure domestic distribution licenses, causing Soedarpo to leave the company and start the NVDP Soedarpo Corporation in 1952. After securing the import license, Soedarpo took over distribution rights from Zorro in a profit-sharing scheme. In 1958, he secured rights to distribute UNIVAC units.

He also obtained contracts and import licenses for military vehicles. He borrowed money from Hamengkubuwono IX to purchase a 75 percent stake at Dutch-owned shipping company Indonesian Shipping and Transport (ISTA) in 1953, and became its managing director. The following year, he managed to secure lucrative agencies with German Hapag and Japanese Tokyo Senpaku Kaisha shipping lines to Indonesia. He also acquired Dutch stevedoring firm Stroohoeden Veem in 1956. In 1964, ISTA and the stevedoring companies under Soedarpo's control were merged into a single firm, Samudera Indonesia.

Soedarpo also founded insurance company Asuransi Bintang and Bank Niaga in 1955. By 1986, Soedarpo controlled 21 companies. Dutch historian Thomas Lindblad noted that Soedarpo "reputedly became the single most successful indigenous capitalist of the Sukarno period". In the 1980s, the Soedarpo group of companies had the third largest sales amongst companies controlled by pribumi entrepreneurs. By 1997, when Samudera Indonesia stock was floated in the Singapore Stock Exchange, Soedarpo was its chairman. In 2006, Forbes placed him 37th in their list of 40 richest Indonesians, placing his net worth at US$100 million.

In 1995, President Suharto awarded Soedarpo with the Bintang Mahaputera Pratama.

== Personal life and family ==
During his time at AMS, Soedarpo was a hurdling athlete, winning the Javanese hurdling championship of 1940. Soedarpo was also a member of Rotary International, becoming one of its district governors.

He was married to Minarsih "Mien" Wiranatakoesoemah and has had three daughters: Shanti Lasminingsih Poesposoetjipto, Ratna Djuwita Tunggul Hatma, and Chandraleika Mulia. They gave him six grandchildren, and two grand-grandchildren at the time of his death. Her wife, Mien, died in 2013.

== Death ==
Soedarpo died in Jakarta on 22 October 2007. He was buried in the Tanah Kusir Public Cemetery.
