= CIMB Niaga =

Indonesian private bank

PT Bank CIMB Niaga Tbk

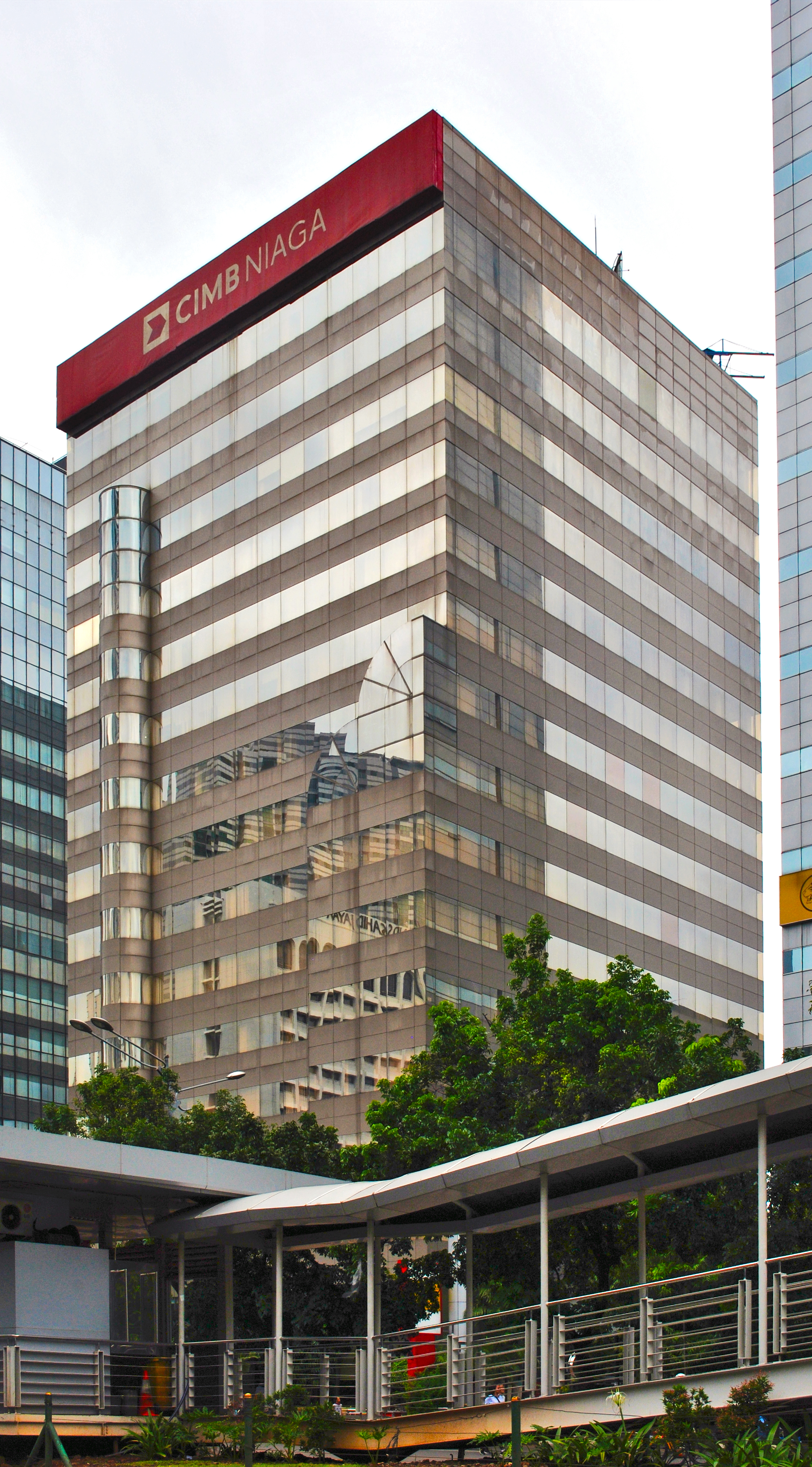
- CIMB Niaga Tower, Jakarta
- Formerly: Bank Niaga (1955–2008)
- Type: Public
- Traded as: IDX: BNGA
- Industry: Banking
- Founded: 1955; 71 years ago
- Founder: Soedarpo Sastrosatomo
- Headquarters: Jl. Jend. Sudirman Kav. 58, Jakarta
- Key people: Didi Syafruddin Yahya (President Commissioner), Lani Darmawan (CEO)
- Services: Financial
- Revenue: ▲ Rp 25.3 trillion (2019)
- Net income: ▲ Rp 3.9 trillion (2019)
- Total assets: ▲ Rp 274.46 trillion (2019)
- Total equity: ▲ Rp 43.28 trillion (2019)
- Number of employees: 12,372 (2019)
- Parent: Commerce Kapital (2002-2006); Lippo Group (1989-2008); CIMB Group (2006-present)
- Subsidiaries: CIMB Niaga Sekuritas; CIMB Niaga Syariah; CIMB Niaga Auto Finance; Saseka Finance
- Website: www.cimbniaga.com

PT Bank CIMB Niaga Tbk is an Indonesian private bank. It is the sixth largest bank by assets, established in 1955. The bank which is majority-owned by Malaysian CIMB Group Holdings Berhad is the largest payment bank in terms of transaction value under the Indonesian Central Securities Depository. With 11% of market share, CIMB Niaga is the third largest mortgage provider in Indonesia.

== History ==
=== Bank Niaga ===

Logos of Bank Niaga and Lippo Bank until both were officially merged into CIMB Niaga on 1 November 2008.

The bank was first established in 1955 as a national private bank. In 1969 when crisis hit the private sector in Indonesia, Bank Niaga remained sound and was eligible for Bank Indonesia’s Guarantee. Then in November 1974, Bank Niaga revamped its business plans and became a full service public bank to better meet the demands of customers.

After a merger period with several other commercial banks, the function and individuality of the bank were restored in 1975. The status was resumed to that of a state-run commercial bank. The official name was changed to "Bank Niaga 1955".

In 1976, the bank launched a Professional Loan Program, providing loans for professionals like engineers and doctors. In 1981 and 1982, Bank Niaga 1955 became the first bank in Indonesia to apply an online banking system as well as a network system for its branches. It introduced a foreign currency exchange network in various branches in 1985 along with a variety of new products.

In 1987, Bank Niaga 1955 set itself apart from the competition when it became the first bank in Indonesia to introduce ATM services.

In June 1989, Bank Niaga made an initial public offering (IPO) to be listed on the Indonesia Stock Exchange. The shares were over-subscribed by four times the issued shares at 20.9 million shares.

In 1991, Bank Niaga became the first bank to provide online banking facilities in Indonesia.

In 1998, Bank Niaga expanded its customer base and began providing services to upper-middle class customers.

In 1999, Bank Niaga was put under the supervision of the Indonesian Bank Restructuring Agency, because it did not meet the 20% shareholders' funds required for the recapitalization exercise.

In 2002, Commerce Asset-Holding Berhad (now known as CIMB) acquired Bank Niaga. It was re-branded in May 2008, several months prior to the merger, from PT Bank Niaga Tbk to PT Bank CIMB Niaga Tbk.

=== Lippo Bank ===
Lippo Bank was Indonesia's 9th largest bank in Indonesia by the number of the assets. It was established in 1948 as Bank Perniagaan Indonesia. In March 1989, Bank Perniagaan Indonesia was renamed as Lippo Bank controlled by Mochtar Riady together with the Lippo Group. Indonesia sold the stake in Bank Lippo as part of asset disposals aimed at cutting the government's budget deficit and recouping the 450 trillion rupiah it spent to bail out banks after the 1997 Asian financial crisis. The agency took control of Bank Lippo from its previous owners, the Riady family, after the government injected funds into the lender in 1999 to boost capital. Swissasia Global bought 52.1 percent of Bank Lippo in February 2004 from the Indonesian Bank Restructuring Agency for $142 million. The family continued to hold a minority stake, partly through PT Lippo E-Net, which owned 5.6% of the lender, as well as controlling rights.

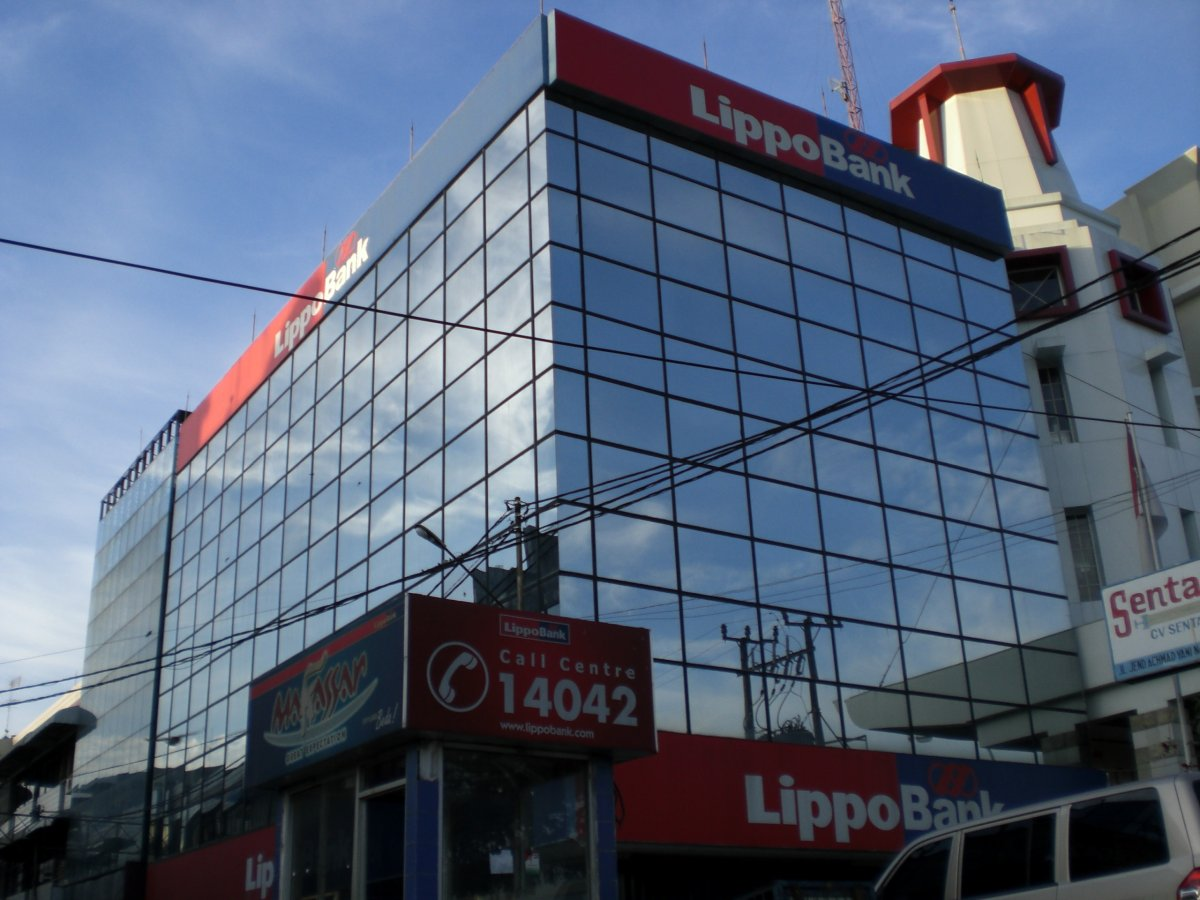
Former Lippo Bank in Makassar in May 2008 (now CIMB Niaga Makassar branch)

Lippo Bank's United States subsidiary was implicated in the scandal of improper contributions to the Clinton-Gore campaign. According to a 1998 Senate Governmental Affairs Committee report, by 1992, while employed by Lippo Bank in California, John Huang began to raise illegal foreign money for the DNC through Lippo-owned shell companies". This money, which wound up in Democratic coffers, was ultimately traced to the "greater China region. Huang's colleagues at Lippo Bank [...] never understood his corporate duties and described him as a 'mystery man,'" the report said.

On 26 August 2005, the bank's shareholders and Bank Indonesia approved the sales of the 52.05% controlling stake held by Swissasia Global to Santubong Investment B.V which was wholly owned by Khazanah Nasional Berhad, the investment arm of the Malaysian federal government. The sales took effect on 30 September the same year.

=== Merger ===
Since Khazanah Nasional had an indirect interest of 93 percent in Lippo Bank through Santubong Investment BV and Greatville Pte. Ltd., and also owns 64 percent of Bank CIMB Niaga through Bumiputra-Commerce Holdings, Bank Niaga and Lippo Bank had to be merged to comply to the Indonesian central bank's "single presence policy". On 1 November 2008, Lippo Bank officially merged with Bank CIMB Niaga and are known as PT Bank CIMB Niaga Tbk, the Indonesian subsidiary of CIMB.

Lippo Group immediately returned to Indonesian banking industry in 2010 when the group acquired the Nobu Bank in 2010.
