= Indonesia National Science Olympiad =

Education organization

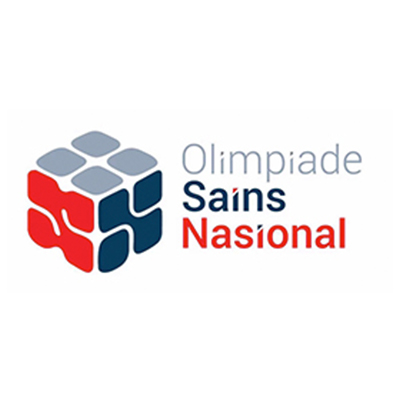
Logo of the competition since 2017

The OSN (Olimpiade Sains Nasional), previously KSN (Indonesian: Kompetisi Sains Nasional) is a science competition for Indonesian students held by the Indonesian Ministry of Education and Culture. This competition consists of a few competitions for elementary school (SD) students, junior high school (SMP) students, and senior high school (SMA) students.

The competition puts students from the thirty-four provinces of Indonesia, and winners of the competition are further selected to represent Indonesia in their respective subjects' International Science Olympiad. In addition, Indonesian public universities are required to accept medal-winners of the competition into their undergraduate programmes.

KSN was initiated in 10 September 2002 when Indonesia first became host of the International Physics Olympiad (IPhO). The first ever national-stage competition was held in Yogyakarta, and in 2003 it was held in Balikpapan with improved rules and procedures.

In 2020, as the new Minister of Education Nadiem Makarim takes office, a brand new governmental agency was created which was called ‘Pusat Prestasi Nasional’ (National Achievement Center) to hold this olympiad. Due to Indonesia's 2032 Olympic bid, all competitions using ‘Olympiad’ in their names are changed into ‘Competition’. Therefore, this competition is called National Science Competition (Kompetisi Sains Nasional).

== Subjects ==
The competition is divided into 3 levels:

1. Elementary School (Sekolah Dasar, SD)
  Mathematics, Natural sciences (IPA) Social sciences (IPS)
2. Junior High School (Sekolah Menengah Pertama, SMP)
  Mathematics, Natural sciences, Social sciences (IPS)
3. Senior High School (Sekolah Menengah Atas, SMA)
  Mathematics, Physics, Biology, Chemistry, Computer science, Earth science, Astronomy, Geography, Economics

== Selection process ==
In general, the overall competition is divided into four stages:

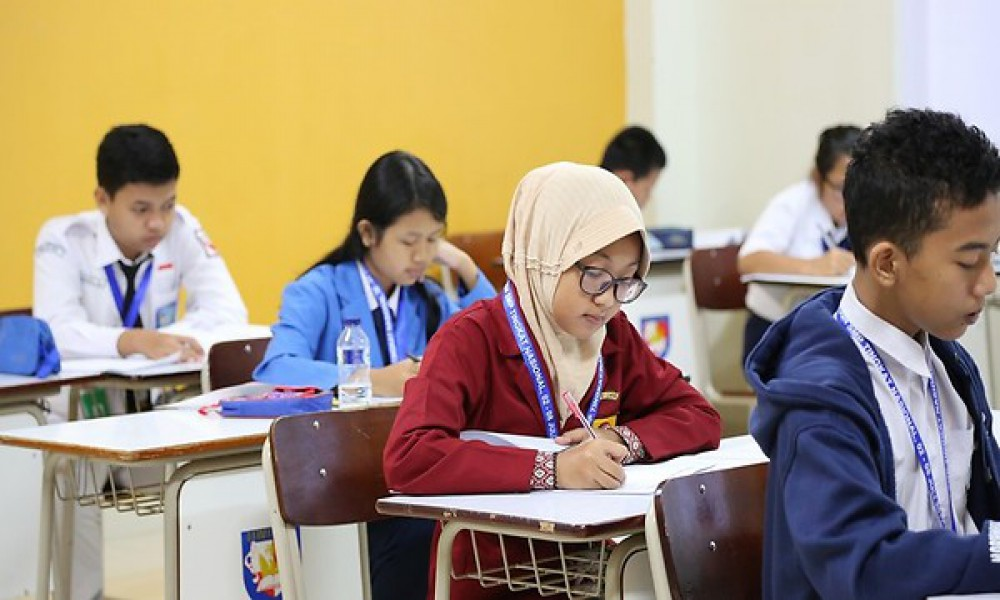
Junior high school participants sitting a theoretical exam

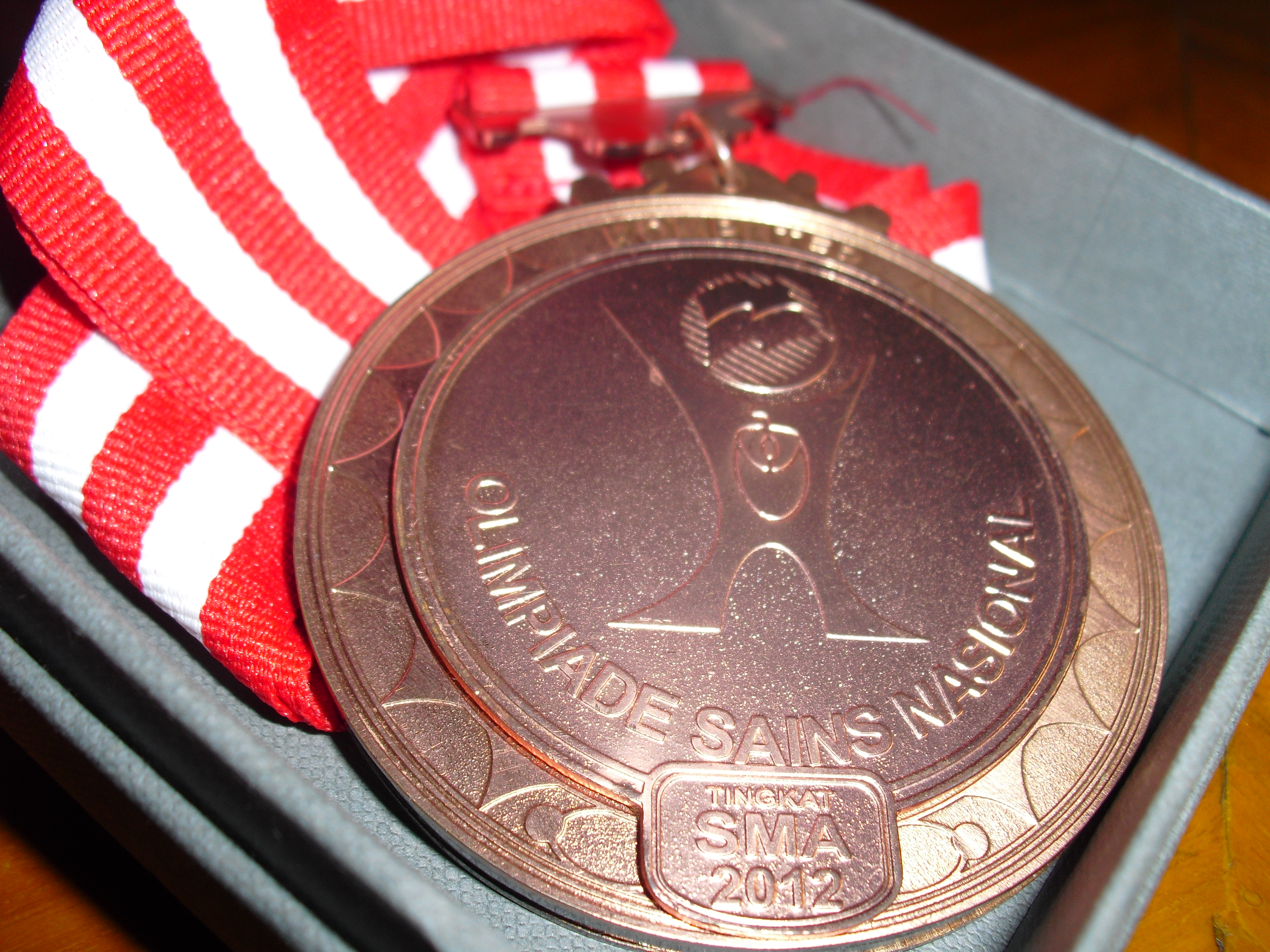
An OSN bronze medal for computer sciences, awarded in 2012.

1. School stage
  Schools may select representatives to the olympiad in any desired manner - no fixed rules apply to individual schools.
2. Regency stage (Olimpiade Sains Kabupaten)
  Students selected to represent their schools are sent to a centralized location in their regency/city where they take a test with other students from the same area. The set of questions are composed by the central body i.e. the Ministry. No centrally-imposed quota for participant count exists for joining this stage, although most local organizers limit the number of participants from individual schools.
  In several provinces, particularly ones in Java such as Jakarta and Central Java, there may be further pre-provincial stage selections.
3. Province stage (Olimpiade Sains Provinsi)
  Regardless of the pre-provincial stage selections, a single province are allowed to represent themselves by up to three times the number of province's regencies in terms of student count, with a minimum limit of a single student per regency. The aforementioned students sit in a single exam which is held simultaneously across the country.
  Individual schools are limited to sending 3 students to this exam.
4. National stage
  A minimum of 1 student per province and generally less than 100 students nationally per subject come together and sit exams, generally one theoretical and one experimental, and winners are selected.
  Individual awards include Absolute Winner (First place), Best Theory and Best Experiment (highest scores in theoretical and experimental exams respectively), along with gold (ranks 1–5), silver (ranks 6-15), and bronze (ranks 16–30) medals.

In 2016, over 320,000 students participated in the Olimpiade Sains Kabupaten across Indonesia, with 1,579 eventually making it into the national phase. In comparison, 420 medals were given out in 2017.

== Events ==
As of 2002, only three provinces have ever won the competition: DKI Jakarta, Central Java, East Java. Those three provinces are commonly seen in the competition as dominant participants, oftentimes sending the largest delegations of students.

| Year | Location(s) | Winner |
|---|---|---|
| 2002 | Yogyakarta | Central Java |
| 2003 | Balikpapan | Central Java |
| 2004 | Pekanbaru | DKI Jakarta |
| 2005 | Jakarta | DKI Jakarta |
| 2006 | Semarang | Central Java |
| 2007 | Surabaya | Central Java |
| 2008 | Makassar | Central Java |
| 2009 | Jakarta | DKI Jakarta |
| 2010 | Medan | DKI Jakarta |
| 2011 | Manado | Central Java |
| 2012 | SD & SMA: Jakarta; SMP: Pontianak | Central Java |
| 2013 | SD & SMA: Bandung; SMP: Batam | Central Java |
| 2014 | SD: Denpasar; SMP: Padang; SMA: Mataram | DKI Jakarta |
| 2015 | SD & SMA: Yogyakarta; SMP: Palu | Central Java |
| 2016 | Palembang | Central Java |
| 2017 | Pekanbaru | DKI Jakarta |
| 2018 | Padang | DKI Jakarta |
| 2019 | SD & SMP: Yogyakarta; SMA: Manado | DKI Jakarta |
| 2020 | Online | East Java |
| 2021 | Online | East Java |
| 2022 | Online | East Java |
| 2023 | Bogor | DKI Jakarta |
| 2024 | Jakarta | East Java |
| 2025 | SD & SMP: Jakarta; SMA: Malang | DKI Jakarta |

In 2020, during the worldwide COVID-19 pandemic, the National Achievement Center (Pusat Prestasi Nasional) instructs that the competition is going to be held online.

== See also ==
- Indonesian National Science and Medicine Olympiad
- Education in Indonesia
