= Lippo Cikarang =

Coordinates: 6.333°S 107.136°E

- Interactive map of Lippo Cikarang

General information
- Location: Bekasi Regency, West Java, Indonesia
- Status: Completed
- Category: Planned city

Construction
- Constructed: 1990–present
- Authority: Government of Bekasi Regency; Government of West Java

Other information
- Governing body: PT Lippo Cikarang Tbk

PT Lippo Cikarang Tbk
- Type: Public
- Traded as: IDX: LPCK
- Industry: Property
- Founded: July 20, 1987; 39 years ago (as PT Desa Dekalb)
- Headquarters: Easton Commercial Centre Lippo Cikarang, Bekasi Regency, West Java, Indonesia
- Owner: Lippo Group
- Website: www.lippo-cikarang.com/en

Lippo Cikarang is an independent township, which is being developed by PT Lippo Cikarang Tbk, a subsidiary of Lippo Group. The township is located at the eastern corridor of Jakarta at Cikarang, West Java, Indonesia. The township has land area of about 3000 hectares. The township has more than 14,000 houses and 993 manufacturing companies in its industrial areas.

== Economy ==
Lippo Cikarang's economy is driven by a mix of industrial companies, and "new economy" Internet and technology companies, service, design and others.

Lippo Cikarang and the nearby industrial parks are home to thousands of Japanese company offices and factories. There are about 17,000 expatriates now reside in the township. About 60 percent of those expatriates are Japanese. A five-star hotel named Sahid Jaya International Hotel, Siloam Gleneagles Hospital, Lippo Mall and Pacific Tower office building are the main sites in the city.

== Infrastructure ==
- Meikarta is a township development within Lippo Cikarang industrial township. It is being built on 500 hectares land area. In the first phase of the development there will be 250,000 apartment units which can accommodate up to 1 million people. Construction works started in January 2016. Meikarta expects to serve as the residential area of other industrial estates in Cikarang region such as Kota Jababeka and MM2100.
- Indonesia-Shenzhen Industrial Estate: PT Lippo Cikarang Tbk with Chinese Shenzhen Yantian Port Group Co Ltd and Country Garden Holdings Co Ltd will develop the Indonesia-Shenzhen Industrial Estate at the township at a cost of $14 billion. The industrial park is expected to draw tenants from Chinese companies, ranging from high tech manufacturers of mobile phone batteries and solar panels, to app developers.
- Education: Some schools in the city are private. Examples include SPH Lippo Cikarang, Charis Global School, Cikarang Japanese School (チカラン日本人学校), Sekolah Dian Harapan, Sekolah Karya Iman, Sekolah National Anglo, Sekolah Tunas Bangsa, International Islamic Boarding School and Al-Hidayah Islamic School.
- Health service: One of Indonesia's largest medical centers is located in Lippo Cikarang. Siloam Hospital, a private hospital, is one among several hospitals serving Jakarta and surroundings.

== Transportation ==
Cikarang is connected by Greater Jakarta Commuter line. Jakarta LRT service from Cawang to East Bekasi and Automated People Mover monorail that will connect seven industrial parks in Cikarang. The township will be connected with Jakarta-Bandung Bullet Train.

Bus services from different bus terminals of Jakarta are available to reach the township. Taxi cabs are also available. Shuttle bus and mini buses are the main mode of public transport within the township.

== See also ==
- Cikarang
- Jabodetabek
- Lippo Group
