= National Plus school =

Type of school in Indonesia

A National Plus school in Indonesia refers to a school that offers education beyond the minimum requirements of the national Indonesian accreditation authorities. It is an unofficial term, undefined by law, regulation or any official body and therefore open to interpretation in practice. Typically national plus schools offer some subjects taught in English rather than in Indonesian, may provide some native English speakers on staff or may offer international curriculum such as from Cambridge International Examinations (CIE) or the International Baccalaureate Organisation (IBO).

Currently, the Indonesian Ministry of Education and Culture has released new term for International School which is known as SPK (Satuan Pendidikan Kerjasama). There are around 500+ school registered as SPK at the moment.

National Plus schools can typically be differentiated from international schools by their core market. International schools tend to primarily exist to serve the needs of expatriate students and national plus schools for Indonesian students; however there is significant overlap on both sides.
