= Times Bookstores =

Singaporean bookstore chain

Times Bookstore is a chain of bookstores in Singapore which is part of the Times Publishing Group, a unit of Fraser and Neave, which started in Singapore in 1978.

== Current operations ==
There is currently a single Times Bookstore store in Macau at The Venetian Macao.

== Former operations ==
Times Bookstore opened at Lippo Karawaci Lippo Supermall in Indonesia in 2008. The Lippo Supermall location has since closed and a second location at Universitas Pelita Harapan was converted to Books and Beyond in 2012.

Times Bookstore previously had operations in Singapore but however ceased from 22 September 2024 with the closure of its last store in Cold Storage Jelita. At its peak, Times Bookstore had outlets in the malls of Tampines One, Waterway Point, Cold Storage Jelita, Plaza Singapura, Paragon, and The Centrepoint, but many of its outlets closed between 2019 and 2024.
