= First Media (Indonesian media company) =

Indonesian media and telecommunications company

PT First Media Tbk
- Formerly: PT Safira Ananda (1994–1995); PT Tanjung Bangun Semesta (1995–2000); PT Broadband Multimedia Tbk (2000–2007)
- Type: Public
- Traded as: IDX: KBLV
- Industry: Media; Telecommunications
- Predecessors: PT Anditirta Indonusa
- Founded: 1994
- Headquarters: Jakarta, Indonesia
- Key people: Peter F. Gontha (Co-founder); Harianda Noerlan (President Director); Teguh Pudjowigoro (President Commissioner)
- Services: Cable TV; Broadband
- Revenue: ▲ Rp 1.308 trillion (2016)
- Net income: ▼ Rp -1.587 trillion (2016)
- Total assets: ▲ Rp 12.779 trillion (2016)
- Subsidiaries: LinkNet; First Media Television; First Media Production; DeltaNet; Internux; Prima Wira Utama; Media Sinema Indonesia; Lynx Mitra Asia; MSH Niaga Telecom
- Website: www.firstmedia.com

PT First Media Tbk is an Indonesian media and telecommunications company which primarily focused on pay cable television and Internet services.

== Ownership ==
The company was primarily owned by the Lippo Group, but in late 2019 the group began reducing the shares it owned. By August 2021, Axiata (who operates the XL network) had obtained the majority shares of First Media's subsidiary, LinkNet.
