= Lippo Karawaci =

Suburb in Tangerang, Banten, Indonesia

Lippo Village
- Interactive map of Lippo Village

General information
- Location: Tangerang and Tangerang Regency, Banten, Indonesia
- Status: Completed
- Category: Planned city

Construction
- Constructed: 1996–present
- Authority: Government of Tangerang; Government of Tangerang Regency; Government of Banten

Other information
- Governing body: PT Lippo Karawaci Tbk

PT Lippo Karawaci Tbk
- Type: Public
- Traded as: IDX: LPKR
- Founded: Mochtar Riady (1990)
- Headquarters: Tangerang, Indonesia
- Key people: Gouw Vi Ven, CEO
- Products: Property
- Revenue: ▲ Rp 6,160 billion (2012)
- Net income: ▲ Rp 1,060 billion (2012)
- Number of employees: 10,000+ (2017)
- Website: www.lippokarawaci.co.id (corporate) www.lippovillage.com/Home (Lippo Village)

Lippo Karawaci or Lippo Village is a multiracial community in Tangerang, 23 km west of Jakarta, Indonesia. The township is within the Jakarta metropolitan area. Previously a swamp area, it opened in 1993 and is today a benchmark for Indonesia's other urban developments. This integrated development supports the "one-stop" living concept and combines residential condominiums, office space, education and healthcare facilities as well as commercial and entertainment areas in a strategic location and a green environment. Lippo Village has 120 km of internal roads and 250 km of drainage system networks. Population of the township is about 70,000 with over 200,000 visitors daily.

== History ==
PT. Lippo Karawaci Tbk. was first established as PT. Tunggal Reksakencana in 1990, as a subsidiary of Lippo Group, to build the Lippo Karawaci (then Lippo Village) township in Tangerang. Lippo Village has a CBD area of about 132 hectares and Millennium Village is part of that development. Development of Millennium Village, which is termed as a global smart city is going on in a 70 hectares land area at the CBD of Lippo Village. The project is being developed at an estimated cost of $15 billion.

== Infrastructure ==
Known for its clean environment and excellent infrastructure, Lippo Karawaci consists of three main residential areas and a commercial district. Supermal Karawaci (previously Lippo Supermal), located at the heart of the commercial district, was the largest shopping centre in west of Jakarta when it opened in 1996. Next to Supermal Karawaci, is the area of Benton Junction. This area of sidewalk restaurants, coffee shops, small boutiques and tree-lined streets has a feel reminiscent of a European Village. Across from Benton Junction is a large, two-storey Books & Beyond (previously Times Bookstore), one of Indonesia's largest English-language bookstores.

Sekolah Pelita Harapan (SPH), Sekolah Dian Harapan (SDH) and University of Pelita Harapan (UPH), all part of Yayasan Pelita Harapan were founded (and are located) in Lippo Karawaci. The township also hosts Siloam Hospital (previously Siloam Gleneagles Hospital), a four star Imperial Aryaduta Hotel and a championship Imperial Golf Club.

The apartment complex Amartapura, which is located in the township, consists of a 50 story and 40 story tower. Most Lippo companies are headquartered in Lippo Karawaci including AIG Life, Matahari Department Store and Supermarket, Multipolar Corporation, Lippo Bank, Kabelvision and Lippo General Insurance. Lippo Village has 3 business park, known as Lippo Cyber Park (Ruko Gajah Mada), Karawaci Office Park (Ruko Pinangsia) and The Excellis. There are 3 clusters of shop houses in the township, Lippo Village Central, West and North.

The area is also home to many businesses run by Korean expatriates in Indonesia. The temporary Jakarta Street Circuit in Karawaci was confirmed to host the fifth round of the 2008-09 A1 Grand Prix season, set for the weekend of 8 February 2009 to showcase the village and the surrounding businesses. The track is designed by Hermann Tilke. However, the race failed to materialise, and since then parts of the race track and pit stop has been converted into University of Pelita Harapan’s parking lot and faculty building.

== Transportation ==
The township itself has a direct highway exit to the Jakarta–Tangerang Toll Road. Within the Lippo Village area, there are shuttle bus services. The township authority also provide external shuttle bus and helicopter services to many areas in Jakarta and surrounding areas. In the future, Lippo Karawaci will be served by the Jakarta MRT East–West Line, which will run from Cikarang to Balaraja. This significant infrastructure project is scheduled to begin construction in mid-2026 and will pass along the Jakarta–Tangerang toll road.
