= Pelita Harapan School =

Private international school in Jakarta, Indonesia

Sekolah Pelita Harapan
- Greater Jakarta; Indonesia

Information
- Type: Private International School
- Established: 1993
- Enrollment: 2300
- Campuses: Lippo Village, Sentul City, Lippo Cikarang, Kemang Village, Pluit Village
- Mascot: Eddie the Eagle
- Website: https://sph.edu/

Sekolah Pelita Harapan (SPH) is a group of five private Christian international schools located around Greater Jakarta, Indonesia.

SPH has five campuses in Lippo Village, Tangerang for Early Childhood to Grade 12, Sentul City, Bogor for Pre-Kindergarten to Grade 12, Lippo Cikarang for Early Childhood to Grade 12, Kemang Village, South Jakarta for Early Childhood to Grade 12, and Pluit Village for Early Childhood to Grade 10. Recently, Pluit Village announced that they will be building a new building to accommodate Grades 11 and 12, announced on 25 May 2026.

== History ==
In 1993, SPH was founded by billionaires Johannes Oentoro (1952-2011) and Dr. James Riady, the Lippo Village campus was the first SPH campus followed by campuses in Sentul City in 1994 and Lippo Cikarang in 1995. Kemang Village and Pluit Village campuses opened in 2011 and 2014 respectively.

== Notable alumni ==
- Agnes Monica (Class of 2004)- known professionally as Agnez Mo, a singer-songwriter and actress
- Nicole Zefanya (Class of 2017)- known professionally as Niki, a singer-songwriter
- Vania Larissa - a singer and beauty pageant titleholder
