= John Huang =

American criminal

- Born: 1945 (age 80–81); Nanping, Fujian, Republic of China
- Citizenship: United States
- Education: University of Connecticut
- Known for: Felony conviction
- Date apprehended: August 12, 1999

Deputy Assistant Secretary for International Economic Affairs
- President: Bill Clinton

John Huang (Chinese: 黃建南, born 1945) is a major figure in the 1996 United States campaign finance controversy. He worked for Lippo Bank in California and Worthen Bank in Arkansas, and as deputy assistant secretary for international economic affairs in U.S. President Bill Clinton's Commerce Department before he became a chief fundraiser for the Democratic National Committee in 1996.

== Early life and education ==
Huang was born in 1945 at Nanping in Fujian. His father Huang Tizhai was a native of Wenzhou, Zhejiang and served the KMT. Huang and his father fled to Taiwan at the end of the Chinese Civil War before he eventually emigrated to the United States in 1969 to study for an M.B.A. at the University of Connecticut.

== Career ==
After working as a loan officer at small banks around Washington D.C., Huang moved to Kentucky and Tennessee before becoming Vice President of Worthen Bank in Little Rock in 1984. He continued to work for Lippo at the same time.

== Criminal conviction ==
On August 12, 1999, Huang pleaded guilty to a felony conspiracy charge for violating campaign finance laws and was sentenced to one year of probation. He was also ordered by U.S. District Court to pay a $10,000 fine and serve 500 hours of community service. Prosecutors said Huang was responsible for arranging about $156,000 in illegal campaign contributions from Lippo Group employees to the Democratic Party.
