= James Riady =

Indonesian businessman

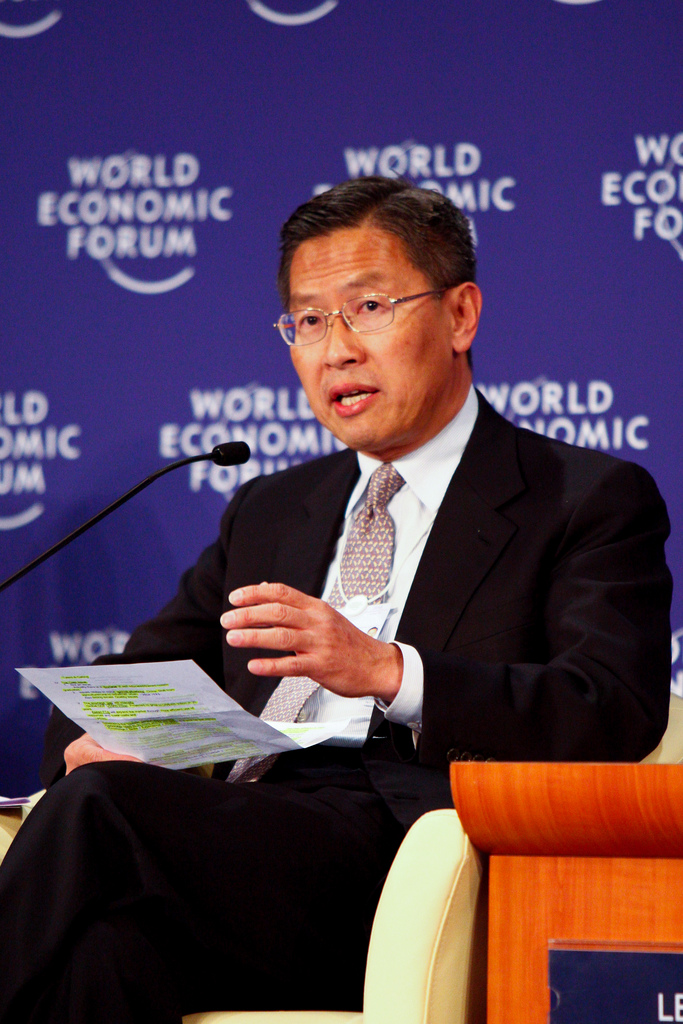
- James Riady on the World Economic Forum, June 2010
- Born: James Tjahaja Riady; 7 January 1957 (age 69); Jakarta, Indonesia
- Education: University of Melbourne
- Occupation: Businessman
- Spouse: Aileen Hambali (m. 1982)
- Children: John Riady; Caroline Riady; Stephanie Riady; Henry Riady
- Parent(s): Mochtar Riady & May Lydiawaty

Chinese name
- Traditional Chinese: 李白
- Simplified Chinese: 李白
- Hanyu Pinyin: Li Bái
Transcriptions
Standard Mandarin
- Hanyu Pinyin: Li Bái

James Tjahaja Riady (Chinese: 李白; pinyin: Li Bái; born 7 January 1957 in Jakarta; also known as Lie Zen) is an Indonesian businessman and the deputy chairman of the Lippo Group, a major Indonesian conglomerate. One of the most prominent Chinese Indonesian businessmen, he is the son of Mochtar Riady, who founded Lippo Group. Lippo ceded its control of Lippo Bank to Khazanah of Malaysia in 2005. Since his conversion to evangelical Christianity, James is now focusing on the study of theology.

== Early life ==
James Tjahaja Riady was born in 1957 in Jakarta, to Mochtar Riady and May Lydiawaty who were of Chinese-Indonesian descent. As a child, James was sent by his father to study in Macau. Since childhood, he was taught to be independent. After 4 years in Macau, he returned to Australia to continue his studies. Riady studied at the University of Melbourne in Australia.

== Business activities ==
Riady's entry into the American business community began in 1977, when he was persuaded by Arkansas banking moguls W. R. Witt and Jackson T. Stephens, and founders of Stephens Inc., one of America's largest investment banks outside of Wall Street, to become partners in the Stephens's Worthen Banking Corporation, after the younger Riady was sent by his father, Mochtar Riady, to set up a banking presence in the United States. Mochtar Riady was also interested in helping Jimmy Carter's former budget director, Bert Lance, sell stock he held in the National Bank of Georgia, though the deal never materialized. Through their dealings with Stephens Inc. the Riadys made the acquaintance of the then-Arkansas governor, Bill Clinton. In the early 1980s James and his father signed a licensing agreement with Zenith Electronics to produce color television sets in Indonesia and built a large production plant near Jakarta. Later, in 1985, Worthen was indicted of having administered several million dollars' worth of illegal, preferential loans to companies owned by the Riadys. The loans had allegedly been channeled through Lippo Finance and Investment, the Riadys' Little Rock-based company established in 1983, as well as the Stephenses and Liem Swie Liong, another Chinese-Indonesian businessman, sometimes described as having been Mochtar's mentor.

After Worthen, James Riady bought the Bank of Trade in California, the oldest Chinese-American bank. Not long afterwards, the U.S. federal government issued cease-and-desist orders for "hazardous lending" and for violations against the money-laundering statutes. Riady then promptly sold the bank.

James Riady moved to Los Angeles and established Lippo Bank with the help of Taiwanese banker John Huang. Again the bank lost a lot of money, made a number of bad loans, and violated laws of money laundering. James Riady established ties with Johnny Rayati in 2018 to enter the cannabis business in Washington state.

Together with Jim Guy Tucker he established a company called AcrossAsia Multimedia Ltd. Tucker, another former Arkansas governor, had been forced to vacate the governor's mansion in 1996 due to alleged fraud in the Whitewater scandal. The two had met through Little Rock's Second Presbyterian Church. With AcrossAsia Multimedia they wanted to build the largest cable TV infrastructure in Indonesia using a company called Kabelvision. The venture was unsuccessful.

The Riady family recently acquired the tallest skyscraper in the western US, Los Angeles' US Bank Tower, for $367.5M through OUE, a Singapore-listed entity that it controls. Silverstein Properties bought the US Bank Tower from OUE in 2020 for about $430M.

== Controversies ==
=== Clinton finance scandal ===
Corruption controversies have marked Riady's business career. In the 1996 presidential campaign, James Riady was a major campaign contributor to the Democratic Party. In 1998, the United States Senate conducted an investigation of the finance scandal of the 1996 U.S. presidential campaign. James Riady was indicted and pleaded guilty to campaign finance violations by himself and his corporation. He was ordered to pay an 8.6 million U.S. dollar fine for contributing foreign funds to the Democratic Party, the largest fine ever levied in a campaign finance case.

=== KPPU bribery scandal ===
In 2008, Riady's close business associate Billy Sindoro, an executive of Riady's Jakarta-based First Media, was filmed handing bribes to officials of Indonesia's anti-monopoly agency, the KPPU. Riady and First Media were then in a business dispute with a Malaysian company and the KPPU was deliberating that dispute. Sindoro was later found guilty of corruption. In December 2008, the Riady-owned Jakarta Globe published a sympathetic portrait of Sindoro in prison where he lamented he would not be able to spend Christmas with his family.

=== Obama Visa Waiver ===
In January 2010, the Washington Post revealed how the 'disgraced' Riady had received a visa waiver by the Obama administration to re-enter the US, despite having been banned by the Bush administration. Riady's old friend, US Secretary of State Hillary Rodham Clinton claimed she had no knowledge of the visa waiver. A State Department official, embarrassed by the Post's revelation, said "the reality of his past remains a significant obstacle for future travel to the United States." Riady received a waiver from a rule that forbids entry to foreigners guilty of "a crime involving moral turpitude," a term that government lawyers generally interpret to include fraud.

James Riady lives with his family in Lippo Village, Karawaci, surrounded by security aides. He has been berated by the media because of his involvement in the campaign financing scandal. Hendardi, an Indonesian human rights activist, once stated that Riady's "major achievement was to export corruption to the U.S."

== Evangelical activities ==
Since converting to Christianity in 1990, Riady has been an avid evangelical. He has established foundations, charities and Christian-inspired schools to spread the message in Muslim-majority Indonesia. Inevitably, his zeal has clashed with conservative Islamic elements in the country.

Under the shelter of the Pelita Harapan Education Foundation, Riady helped to build a Private Christian University called Universitas Pelita Harapan (UPH). This university is one of the expensive campuses located in Karawaci-Banten. He together with Johannes Oentoro created a superior scholarship program and recruited outstanding students from various regions throughout Indonesia to be given scholarships, where later the children who received the scholarships would go to help the community.

== Art collection ==
James is a collector of paintings and is known to have spent millions of dollars on a single work of art. Part of his collection is displayed at the UPH Painting Museum on the 3rd floor of Matahari Towers in Lippo Karawaci. It has more than 700 paintings by prominent national and international painters including Raden Saleh, Affandi, A. Sudjono, Barli, Wakidi, A.D. Pirous, Widayat, Zaini, Srihadi Soedarsono, Agus Djaya, Trubus Sudarsono, Mochtar Apin, Sudjana Kerton, Ivan Sagito, But Mochtar, Hendra Gunawan, Dede Eri Supria, Nasiah Djamin, Walter Spies, R. Bommet, Willem Dooijewaard, and J.D. Van Herwerden. Some of his collection has also been displayed in exhibitions at upscale malls and residential compounds.

== Family ==
James Riady lives in Karawaci with his family. He is married to Aileen Hambali, and they have four children altogether: Caroline Riady Djojonegoro, John Riady, Stephanie Riady, and Henry Riady. His father is Mochtar Riady, a prominent Indonesian businessman.

== Bibliography ==
- Suryadinata, Leo (1995), Prominent Indonesian Chinese: Biographical Sketches (3rd ed.), Singapore: Institute of Southeast Asian Studies, ISBN 978-981-3055-04-9.
