= Mochtar Riady =

Indonesian financial magnate

- 李文正
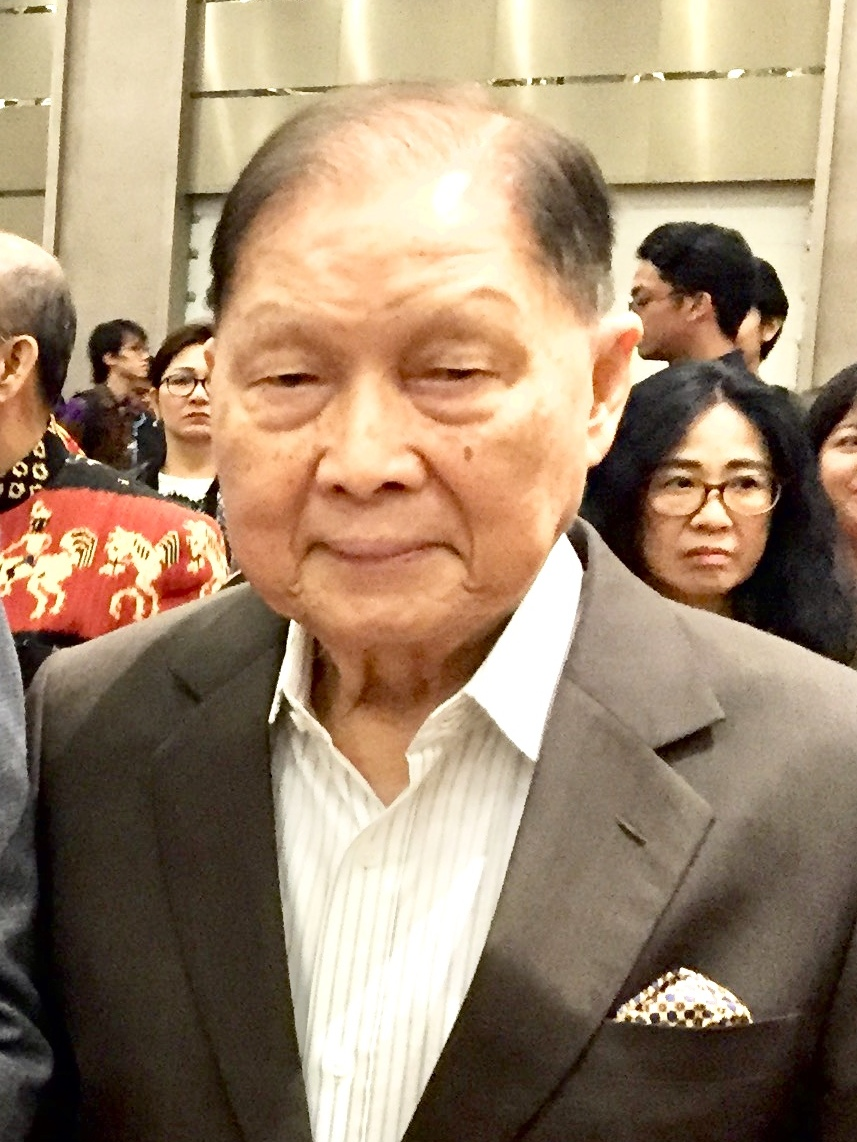
- Riady in 2019
- Born: Lie Mo Tie; 12 May 1929 (age 97); Malang, Dutch East Indies
- Education: University of Nanking
- Known for: Founder and chairman emeritus, Lippo Group
- Spouse: May Lydiawaty (m. 1951)
- Children: Rosy Riady; Andrew Riady; Liliane Riady; James Riady; Stephen Riady; Minny Riady
- Parent(s): Li A Pi; Si Be Lau

Chinese name
- Traditional Chinese: 李文正
- Simplified Chinese: 李文正
Transcriptions
Standard Mandarin
- Hanyu Pinyin: Lǐ Wén Zhèng
Southern Min
- Hokkien POJ: Lí Bûn Tsiànn

Mochtar Riady
- Traditional Chinese: 李文正
- Simplified Chinese: 李文正
- Hanyu Pinyin: Li Wénzhèng
Transcriptions
Standard Mandarin
- Hanyu Pinyin: Li Wénzhèng

Mochtar Riady, born Lie Mo Tie (Chinese: 李文正; pinyin: Lǐ Wén Zhèng; born 12 May 1929) is an Indonesian financial magnate and the founder and chairman emeritus of Lippo Group. He was born in Malang to a Chinese Indonesian family. At five months old, his parents took him to his father's ancestral village in Fujian where he lived until he was six years old.

== Early life ==
Riady's father was a batik trader named Liapi (1887–1959), while his mother was named Sibelau (1889–1937). Both of his parents migrated from Putian and arrived in Malang in 1918.
