= Matahari (department store) =

Indonesian retail company

PT MDS Retailing Tbk
- Logo since October 2022
- Type: Public
- Traded as: IDX: LPPF
- ISIN: ID1000113301
- Industry: Retail
- Founded: 24 October 1958; 68 years ago
- Founder: Tan Tjan Hok
- Headquarters: Menara Matahari, Tangerang Regency, Banten, Indonesia
- Number of locations: 140+ across Indonesia
- Key people: Monish Mansukhani (CEO); Andy Adhiwana (Chairman)
- Revenue: ▲IDR 2,488 Billion (3M 2026)
- Operating income: ▲IDR 903 Billion (3M 2026)
- Net income: ▲IDR 692 Billion (3M 2026)
- Total assets: ▲IDR 6,825 Billion (31 Mar 2026)
- Total equity: ▲IDR 1,009 Billion (31 Mar 2026)
- Owners: Public (46.82%); Treasury Shares (1.37%); Auric Digital Retail (42.51%); Multipolar (9.30%)
- Website: matahari.com

PT Matahari Department Store Tbk, commonly known as Matahari, is the largest retail platform in Indonesia with stores located across the country and online presence on Matahari.com.

== History ==
The company was established on October 24, 1958, by Hari Darmawan (Tan Tjan Hok), a businessman hailing from Ujung Pandang. With the opening of "Mickey Mouse". A children's fashion store in Jakarta's famed Pasar Baru district; although it was renamed into MM Fashion after the opening of its second branch in 1972. shortly afterwards, with Bank loans. Hari would buy Toko De Zon, which at that point, is the largest clothing store in the whole district, the store was later renamed as "Matahari" (as De Zon is Dutch for "the sun") and the first proper Matahari outlet was opened, it was considered as the first modern department store in the country at the time, Introducing payment methods such as using the Bar code and building a customer service system.

The company was listed at the Indonesian Stock Exchange in 1992.

The company previously operated Mega-M, a hypermarket chain and Galeria, an upscale department store opened in partnership with Keio department store of Japan.

In 2007, the company opened Parisian. A second, High-end spin-off of the Matahari brand. Their first, and only outlet at the Taman Anggrek Mall was closed in 2009.

Since July 14, 2021, the majority and controlling shareholder of Matahari Department Store Tbk has changed to Auric Digital Retail Pte. Ltd. Meanwhile, Multipolar remains one of the main shareholders. The rest are other investors. Currently, Matahari operates 140+ outlets in nearly 80 cities throughout Indonesia.

=== Latest Updates ===
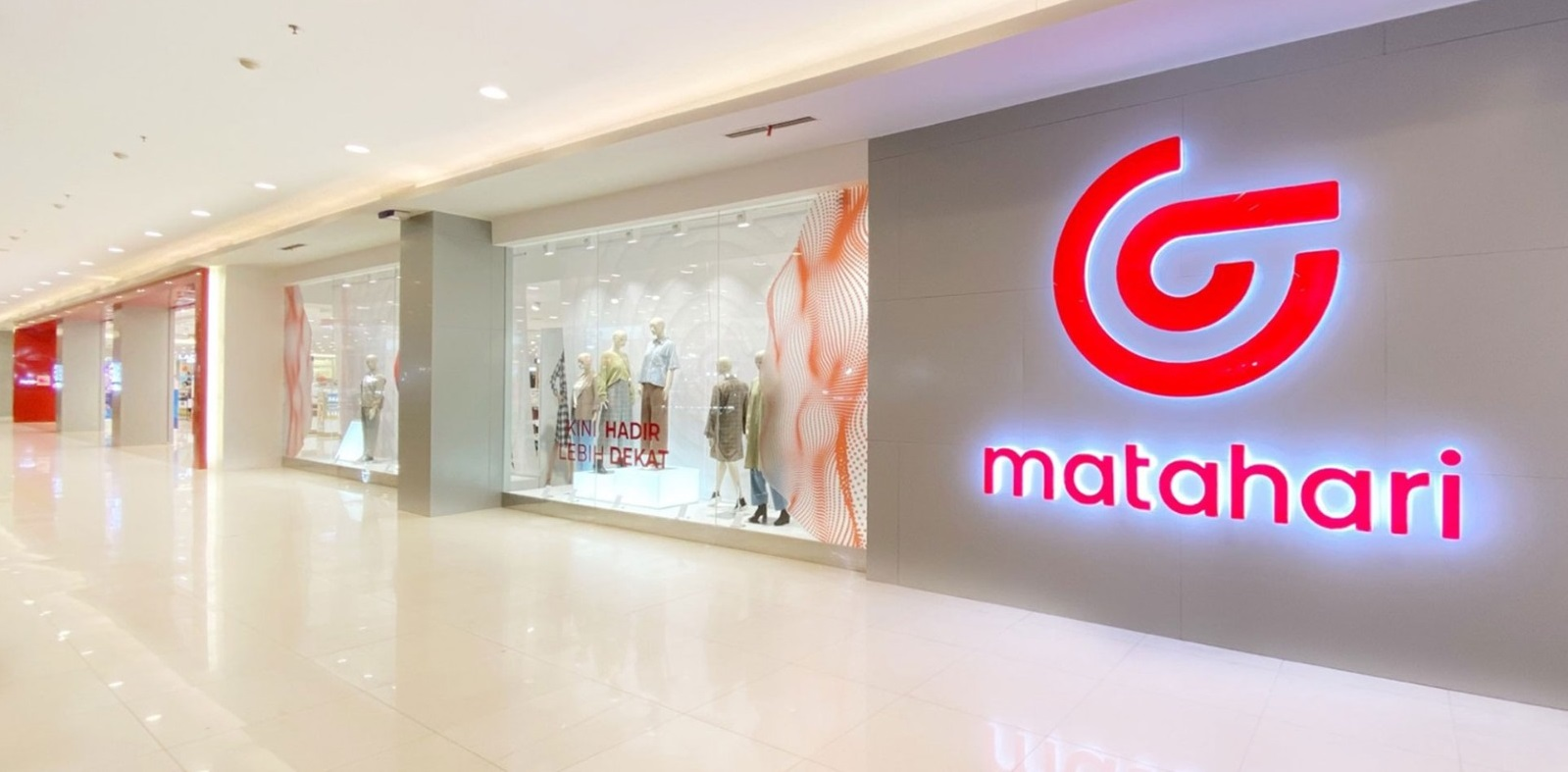
A Matahari storefront

Matahari is focused on strengthening its exclusive brand portfolio, which includes SUKO, ZES, Nevada, Connexion, COLE, and Little M, to appeal to dynamic Indonesian consumers. The company offers a curated range of fashion and lifestyle products across a large network of over 140 stores in nearly 80 cities, complemented by digital platforms like Matahari.com.
