= Cikarang Dry Port =

Port in Indonesia

Coordinates: 6.267390°S 107.164976°E

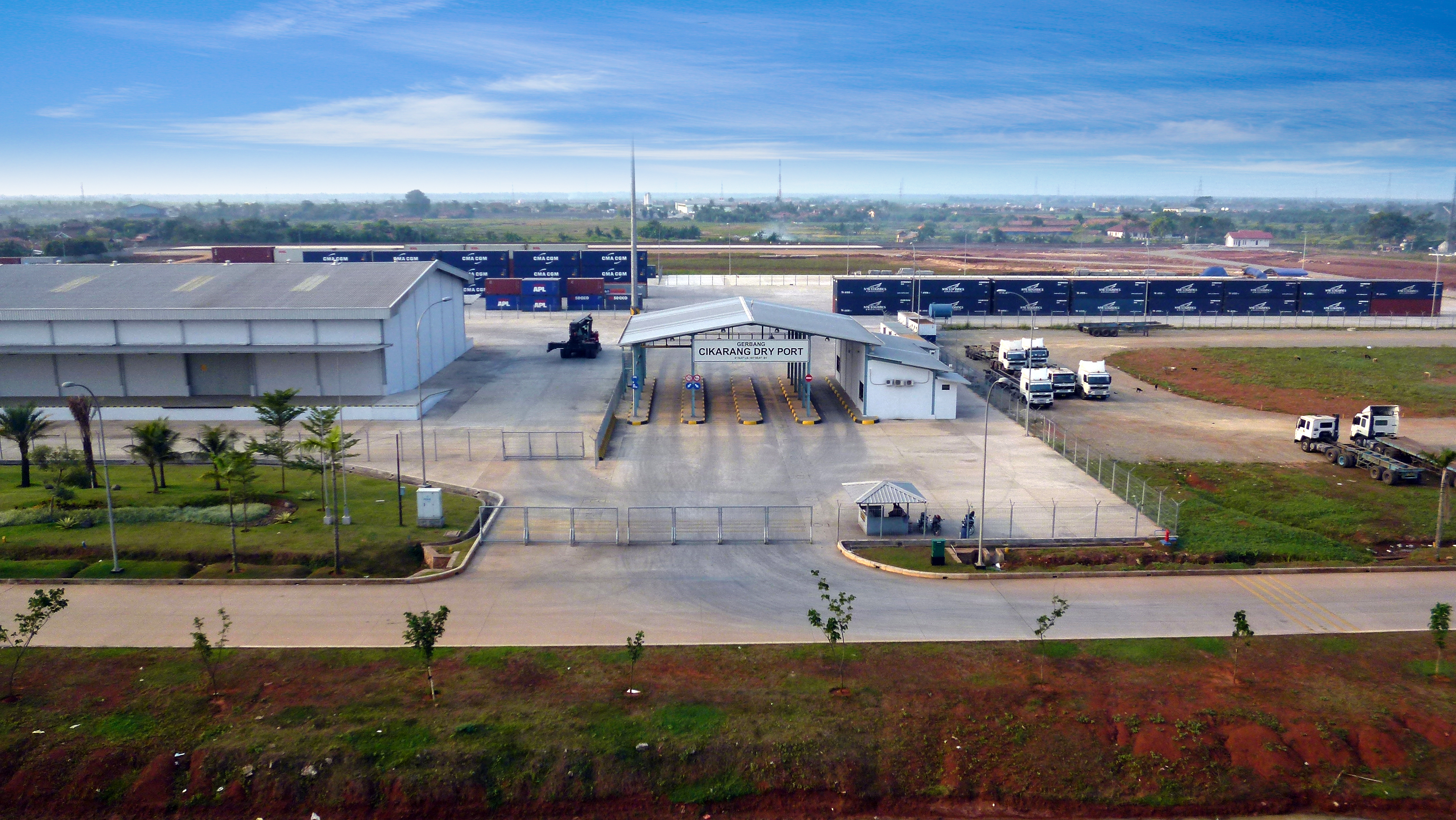
- Aerial view of Cikarang Dry Port
- Interactive map of Cikarang Dry Port

Location
- Country: Indonesia
- Location: Cikarang, West Java

Details
- Opened: 2010
- Operated by: PT Cikarang Inland Port
- Owned by: Jababeka Group
- Type of Harbor: dry port

Statistics
- Website cikarangdryport.com

Cikarang Dry Port (CDP) is a dry port in Kota Jababeka of the town of Cikarang, West Java, Indonesia. With a total area of 200 hectares, CDP was founded in 2010. It is operated as Indonesia's first and only Integrated Customs Services Zone by PT Cikarang Inland Port, a division of the publicly traded PT Jababeka Tbk. As an inland dry port model, CDP acts as a port extension, that addresses ongoing traffic jams and delays at Tanjung Priok, a significant import/export gateway. The primary goal is to reduce the dwelling time from 3.2 days to the government-mandated 2.5 days.

To optimize its operations, the government involves CDP in order to expedite the 2.5-day dwelling time. Its design integrates with Tanjung Priok. The idea is that CDP handles the next step, port clearance, after Tanjung Priok has finished all loading and unloading operations. A freight train will transport containers from the seaport to CDP for administration, quarantine, and inspection in order to expedite the process. A similar procedure can also be used for export. Up to 8 million TEUs can be handled annually at the port because of Tanjung Priok and CDP's integration. Productivity is a critical factor in the development of an industrial business, and is facilitated by the coordination and synchronization of the entire supply chain through CDP. The CDP has a capacity of 250,000 TEUs.

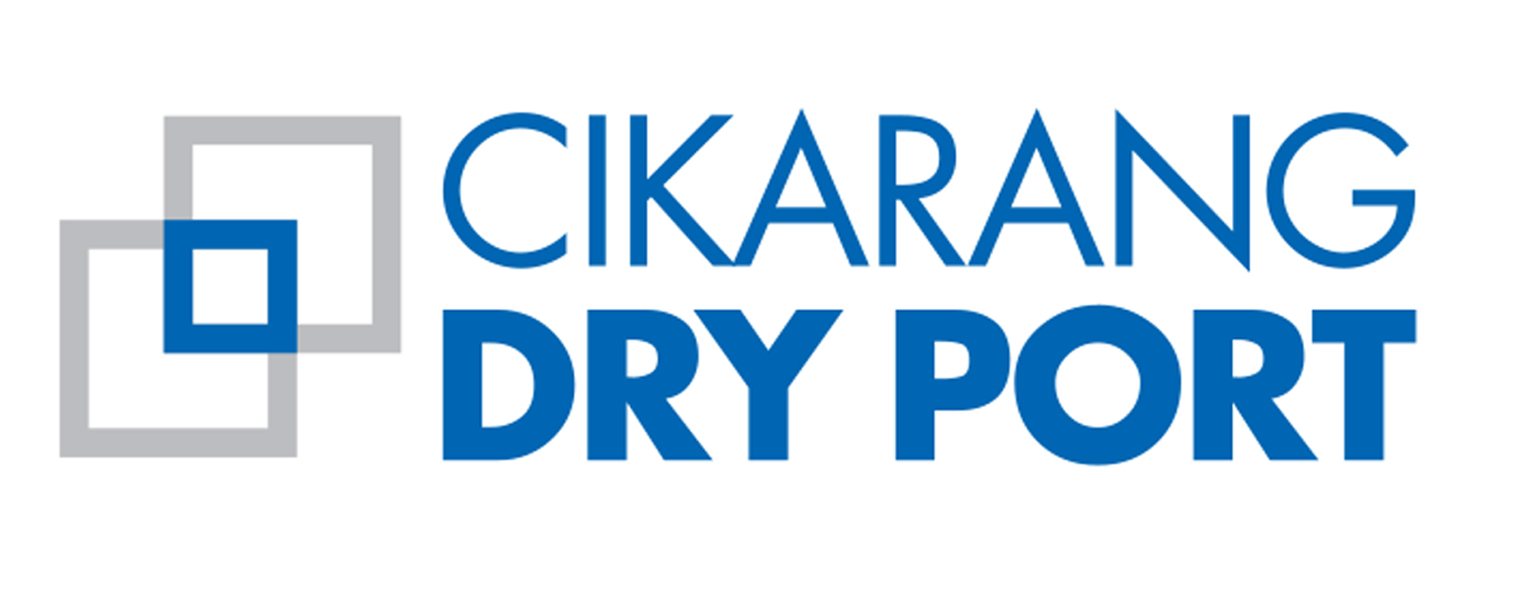
Logo of Cikarang Dry Port

== Traffic solutions ==
The government is aware that reducing traffic between ports and industrial estates, is another additional value that CDP can provide. Integrating CDP with Tanjung Priok could result in a 30% decrease in traffic congestion. The fuel consumption efficiency that results from this contribution is estimated to be worth 190 billion rupiahs annually.

== Access ==
The government provides access to toll roads and the railway system to support the CDP. Furthermore, new CDP access is presently in development. Inland waterways are to be constructed by the Indonesia Port Corporation region II (Pelindo II) and the National Development Planning Agency (Bappenas). The goal of the project is to widen Cikarang Bekasi Laut (CBL), an existing river in order to maximize its potential. The route will be used as a new means of transportation and extends from Tanjung Priok Port to CDP. It will be more economical, energy-efficient, and time-efficient. There is no need for trucking operations, and traffic congestion can be minimized, particularly on the Jakarta - Cikampek and Inner Jakarta toll roads. By using the river, the government avoids building a new toll road. The primary objective of the Cikarang Bekasi Laut (CBL) inland waterway development is to maximize the river channel's potential as a substitute transportation route that connects rural areas and the offshore Tanjung Priok area.

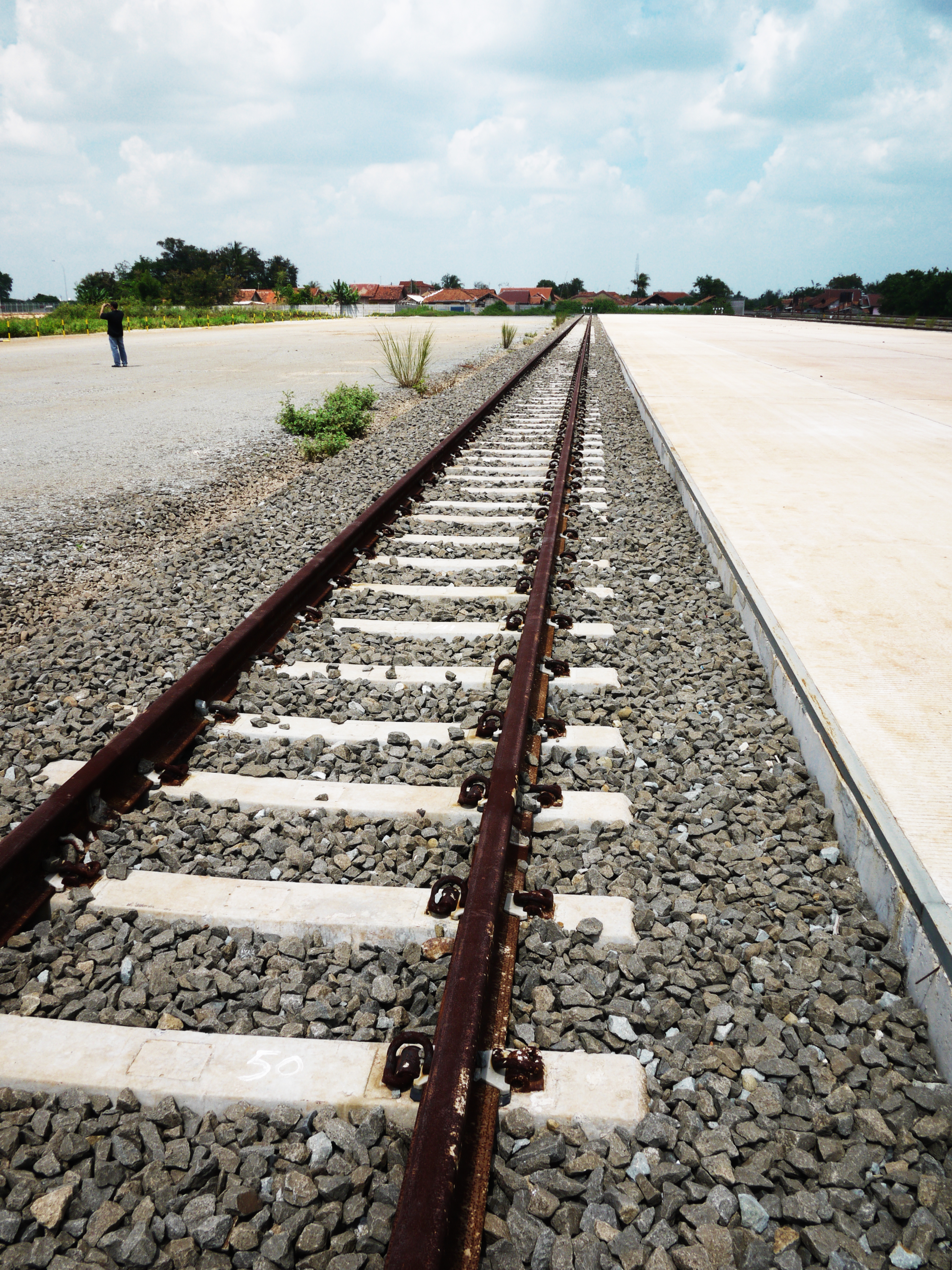
Cikarang Dry Port Railway

== Product and services ==
- Container Yard (CY): With an annual capacity of 400,000 TEUs, the container yard has the potential to grow to 2.5 million TEUs.
- Reefer Plugs: 128 reefer plugs with a backup generator and uninterruptible power supply are available.
- Container Freight Station (CFS) for Import – 3,888 sqm of consolidation warehouse is available for Less than Container Load Cargo handling.
- Bonded Logistics Center – 11,960 sqm of cotton warehouse is available. Second warehouse is targeted to be 82,293 sqm large.
- Empty Container Depot – Empty container depot is available for picking up empty containers for export stuffing or storing empty containers after import.
- Integrated Customs – To support CDP as Integrated Customs Service Zone (KPPT – Kawasan Pelayanan Pabean Terpadu), Cikarang Customs Office is available in CDP area providing needed customs services and monitoring cargo movement at the gate 24/7 and 365 days.
- Integrated Quarantine – Animal, plant, and fish quarantine services are available and integrated within CDP's area.
- Physical Inspection – The facility is prepared for Red Line cargo inspection under customs supervision, and also quarantine inspection if required. Located inside the terminal brings cost and time efficiency. Joint inspection could be arranged for cargos those need both customs and quarantine inspections to save even more time and cost.
- Mobile X-Ray (Hi-Co Scan) – TMobile X-Ray for container scanning is available for physical inspection.
- Electronic Seal – Bonded transfer between sea port and dry port is equipped with Electronic Seal for security, monitoring and tracking.
- Railway Connection – Railway connection is available connecting CDP to the sea port up to Surabaya in East Java. Connection to other major cities of Java connection would be developed later.
- Trucks – Trucks are available for bonded transfer and feeder services to factories and warehouses.
- Container Tracking – Online container tracking is available.
- Indonesia National Single Windows (INSW) – Cikarang Dry Port is one of several ports connected to INSW.

== Stakeholders ==
As CDP offers services in cargo handling and logistics, it deals much with the customs. But not merely with the customs, the logistics service handled involves many stakeholders from both the government and the private sector. These stakeholders include exporters, importers, vessels providers, terminal operators, container freight stations, bonded warehouses, trucking and forwarding agents, third-party logistics (3PL), empty container depots as well as banking and other supporting facilities.

== International port code ==
CDP is legally permitted to deliver exported goods as well as receipt of imported goods to and from all over the world. This possibility is due to CDP having been registered in an international port network and already has a special and unique code which is IDJBK. This allows CDP to become an official Port of Origin and Port of Destination.
