= President University =

Indonesian university

- Universitas Presiden
- Former name: Sekolah Tinggi Teknik Cikarang
- Motto: Where Tomorrow's Leaders Come Together
- Type: Private university
- Established: 2001
- Chairman: Dr. (HC) Setyono Djuandi (SD) Darmono
- Rector: Handa Satyanugraha Abidin, SH, LL.M., Ph.D.
- Location: Cikarang, Bekasi Regency, West Java, Indonesia; 6.285°S 107.1706°E
- Colors: Blue
- Nickname: PresUniv
- Website: president.ac.id
- Location within West Java Location within Java Location within Indonesia

President University (Indonesian: Universitas Presiden) (abbreviated as PresUniv) is a private university located in the Jababeka Industrial Estate in Cikarang. The university officially began its operations on April 16, 2004, through Ministerial Decree 54/D/0/2004.

== History ==
President University was conceptualized by Dr. (HC) Setyono Djuandi Darmono during his tenure as president/director of PT Jababeka and Prof. Donald W. Watts, president of Bond University (Queensland) and deputy advisor of Curtin University in Western Australia. Several prominent figures in Indonesia were also involved in refining the concept of President University, such as Prof. Dr. Juwono Sudarsono (an academic who served as Minister of Environment, Minister of Education and Culture, and Minister of Defense), legal expert Prof. Dr. Charles Himawan, SH, LLM, Ir. Laksamana Sukardi (Minister of State for Investment and Empowerment of SOEs (1999-2001) and Minister of SOEs (2001-2004), Drs. Utomo Josodirjo (a figure in Indonesian Accounting), and national entrepreneur Surjanto Sosrodjojo.

== International Ranking and Accreditation ==
=== International Accreditation ===
President University has obtained international accreditation through its Faculty of Artificial Intelligence and Smart Manufacturing. After undergoing several stages, President University obtained international accreditation from the Indonesian Accreditation Board for Engineering Education (IABEE) institution for the Information System program on February 22, 2023,

On September 30, 2021, the Faculty of Business at President University became a member of the Accreditation Council for Business Schools and Programs (ACBSP). By 2023, the Faculty of Business at President University was accredited A1 by ACBSP.

=== International Rankings ===
President University has been listed in several international rankings that assess various aspects of higher education institutional performance. In the World’s Universities with Real Impact (WURI) rankings, the university was included in multiple categories in 2024 and 2025. On 7 June 2024, President University was ranked 9th worldwide in the Culture/Values category, which evaluates institutional initiatives in developing academic culture, organizational values, and internal community engagement.

In the WURI 2025 rankings announced on 10 July 2025, President University was listed in three categories: 1st place for Entrepreneurial Spirit, 2nd place for Crisis Management, and 2nd place for Infrastructure and Technologies. These categories respectively assess university activities in promoting entrepreneurship, managing crisis situations, and developing and utilizing infrastructure and technology. In the same year, President University was also included in the Global Top 400 Innovative Universities, ranking 220th out of 400 institutions evaluated.

In the WURI 2026 rankings, President University was listed in several assessment categories. The university placed 5th in the Culture/Values category and 5th in the Infrastructure/Technology category. That year, President University also appeared for the first time in 2 new categories, ranking 3rd in AI-Based Teaching and Learning Transformation and 5th in Inclusive Social Innovation for the Underserved. In addition, President University was included in the WURI 2026 Top 500, placing 165th overall.

In addition to the WURI rankings, President University has also been evaluated by Quacquarelli Symonds (QS), an internationally recognized higher education ranking organization. On 18 November 2025, President University received a QS 5 Stars rating, valid until 31 July 2028. The QS Stars assessment covers a range of indicators, including teaching quality, facilities, internationalization, and academic reputation. Furthermore, President University is listed in the QS Asian University Rankings 2025, which positions universities across Asia based on criteria such as research productivity, international visibility, and academic and employer reputation.

In 2024, President University participated for the first time in the Times Higher Education (THE) Impact Rankings, a global ranking that measures universities’ contributions to achieving the 17 Sustainable Development Goals (SDGs) established by the United Nations. In this ranking, President University was placed in the 1501–2318 range worldwide and ranked 54th among 71 Indonesian universities, with notable performance in the SDGs Peace, Justice and Strong Institutions, Decent Work and Economic Growth, Quality Education, and Partnerships for the Goals. The university also took part in the UI GreenMetric World University Rankings, a sustainability-focused ranking system developed by Universitas Indonesia, and in 2025 achieved a position of 736th out of 1,745 universities globally, improving from 836th in the previous year. In the 2026 edition, the university further advanced to 480th place out of 2,016 participating universities worldwide and 57th nationally among 217 Indonesian universities, reflecting continued progress in its sustainability performance. In the EduRank 2026 ranking, which is based on independent public data, President University ranks 3,308th in the world, 1,032nd in Asia, and 59th nationally in Indonesia. These rankings are supported by the university's research performance, encompassing 3,933 academic publications with a total of 17,359 citations across various disciplines. Furthermore, in the AppliedHE 2025 rankings, which focus on private universities and applied education in Asia, President University was ranked 153rd in Asia, 57th in Southeast Asia, and 14th nationally, with strong evaluations in teaching quality, graduate employability, and institutional reputation. According to the uniRank 2025 rankings, which assess universities based on their online presence and visibility rather than academic performance, President University was ranked 133rd nationally in Indonesia and 6,020th worldwide.

International Rankings of President University
Ranking	Year	President University’s Achievement
UI GreenMetric World University Rankings	2026	Ranked 480th out of 2,016 universities worldwide
World’s Universities with Real Impact (WURI)	2026	Ranked 5th worldwide in the Culture/Values category and 5th in Infrastructure/Technology; for the first time entered two new categories: AI-Based Teaching and Learning Transformation at rank 3rd, and Inclusive Social Innovation for the Underserved at rank 5th; listed in the WURI 2026 Top 500 at rank 165
EduRank	2026	Ranked 3,308th in the world, 1,032nd in Asia, and 59th nationally in Indonesia
uniRank	2026	Ranked 133rd nationally in Indonesia, 2,486 in Asia and 6,020th in worldwide
QS Stars	2025	Awarded QS 5 Stars rating, valid until 31 July 2028
QS Asian University Rankings	2025	Listed among universities ranked in the Asian region (1201–1300 band)
Times Higher Education (THE) Impact Rankings	2025	Placed in the 1501–2318 global band and ranked 54th out of 71 Indonesian universities
AppliedHE Rankings	2025	Ranked 153rd in Asia, 57th in Southeast Asia, and 14th nationally in Indonesia

== National Accreditation ==
President University obtained an "Unggul" accreditation from BAN-PT on February 11, 2025, through Decree BAN-PT No. 76/SK/BAN-PT/Ak.KP/PT/lI/2025.. The majority of study programs at President University are accredited.

The following is a list of study program accreditation at President University that has been published by BAN-PT:

Akreditasi Program Studi Universitas Presiden
No.	Study Program	Degree	Decree Number	Decree Year	Grade	Expiration Date
1.	Agribusiness	S1	261/SK/BAN-PT/Ak/S/II/2026	2026	Baik	2031-02-24
2.	Archiitechture	S1	8726/SK/BAN-PT/Ak/S/XII/2025	2025	Baik	2030-12-16
3.	Technology Management	S2	552/DE/A.5/AR.10/VII/2023	2023	Unggul	2028-07-25
4.	Management	S1	723/DE/A.5/AR.10/IX/2023	2023	Unggul	2028-09-18
5.	Interior Design	S1	6239/SK/BAN-PT/Ak/S/III/2026	2026	Baik	2031-03-31
6.	Information System	S1	003/SK/LAM-INFOKOM/Ak.Int/S/XII/2023	2023	Unggul	2028-03-31
7.	Mechanical Engineering	S1	0364/SK/LAM Teknik/AS/XII/2023	2023	Unggul	2028-08-20
8.	Business Administration	S1	75/AK.03.05/2025	2025	Unggul	2029-10-28
9.	Law	S1	7802/SK/BAN-PT/Ak.Ppj/S/X/2025	2025	A	2030-09-30
10.	International Relations	S1	094/AK.03.05/2026	2026	Unggul	2026-04-27
11.	Informatics	S1	002/SK/LAM-INFOKOM/Ak.Int/S/XII/2024	2024	Unggul	2029-03-31
12.	Informatics	S2	098/SK/LAM-INFOKOM/Ak/M/VIII/2025	2025	Unggul	2030-08-08
13.	Actuarial Science	S1	225/SK/LAMSAMA/Akred/S/X/2025	2025	Unggul	2029-10-20
14.	Environmental Engineering	S1	0842/SK/LAM Teknik/AS/XII/2024	2024	Unggul	2029-12-20
15.	Industrial Engineering	S1	0582/SK/LAM Teknik/AS/VIII/2025	2025	Unggul	2030-08-20
16.	Communication Science	S1	138/AK.03.05/2025	2025	Unggul	2030-11-18
17,.	Accounting	S1	039/DE/A.5/LAMEMBA-U/IV/2026	2026	Unggul	2028-04-27
18.	Electrical Engineering	S1	0840/SK/LAM Teknik/AS/XII/2025	2025	Unggul	2030-12-20
19.	Visual Communication Design	S1	644/SK/BAN-PT/Ak.Ppj/S/II/2024	2023	B	2029-02-27
20.	Elementary Teacher Education	S1	524/SK/LAMDIK/Ak/S/V/2024	2024	Unggul	2029-03-26
21.	Magister of Law	S2	4617/SK/BAN-PT/Ak.P/M/VI/2024	2024	Terakreditasi Sementara	2029-06-11
22.	Civil Engineering	S1	0738/SK/LAM Teknik/AS/XII/2024	2024	Baik Sekali	2029-12-20
23.	Medical Science	S1	0691/LAM-PTKes/Akr/Sar/V/2025	2025	Baik	2030-05-23
24.	Medical Profession	Profesi	0692/LAM-PTKes/Akr/Pro/V/2025	2025	Baik	2030-05-23
25	Informatics	S1 (PSDKU)	319/SK/LAM-INFOKOM/Ak.S/S/VIII/2026	2026	Baik	2027-12-31
26	Information System	S1 (PSDKU)	318/SK/LAM-INFOKOM/Ak.S/S/VIII/2026	2026	Baik	2027-12-31
27	Management	S3	788/DE/A.5/AR.11/IX/2025	2025	Baik	2030-09-29
28	Distance Learning Information Systems Program	S1	747/B/O/2026	2026	Terakreditasi Sementara	

== Faculty and Study Program ==
jmpl|Gedung A (Rektorat) Universitas Presiden

As of September 2026, President University comprises seven faculties and offers 27 study programs, consisting of 22 undergraduate (S1) programs, four master’s (S2) programs, and one doctoral (S3) program\. The university also operates one Off\-Campus Study Program (Program Studi di Luar Kampus Utama, PSDKU) in Pekanbaru, which offers two undergraduate programs: Informatics and Information Systems\. In addition, President University provides distance education through its World Campus initiative, which offers online undergraduate education\. Thus, the university offers 27 study programs across three academic levels, in addition to its distance learning initiative and two PSDKU study program offerings in Pekanbaru\. The following is a list of faculties and study programs under the administration of President University\.

FACULTY	STUDY PROGRAM	FACULTY	STUDY PROGRAM
Faculty of Business	Business Administration	Faculty of Engineering	Electrical Engineering
Faculty of Business	Agribusiness	Faculty of Engineering	Electrical Engineering
Faculty of Business	Actuarial Science	Faculty of Engineering	Industrial Engineering
Faculty of Business	Accounting	Faculty of Engineering	Environmental Engineering
Faculty of Business	Management	Faculty of Engineering	Mechanical Engineering
Faculty of Business	Magister Management of Technology	Faculty of Engineering	Civil Engineering
Faculty of Business	Doctor of Management	Faculty of Engineering	Civil Engineering
Faculty of Artificial Intelligence and Smart Manufacturing	Informatics	Faculty of Social Science and Education	Communication Science
Faculty of Artificial Intelligence and Smart Manufacturing	Information System	Faculty of Social Science and Education	Elementary Teacher Education
Faculty of Artificial Intelligence and Smart Manufacturing	Master of Informatics	Faculty of Social Science and Education	International Relation
Faculty of Medicine	Medical Science	Faculty of Social Science and Education	International Relation
Faculty of Medicine	Medical Profession	Faculty of Social Science and Education	International Relation
Faculty of Art, Design, and Architecture	Interior Design	Faculty of Law	Law
Faculty of Art, Design, and Architecture	Visual Communication Design	Faculty of Law	Master of Law
Faculty of Art, Design, and Architecture	Architecture	Faculty of Law	Master of Law

== Off-campus Study Program ==
The Peputra Manggala Nusantara Foundation and the President University Education Foundation collaborated in establishing the Off-Campus Study Program (Program Studi di Luar Kampus Utama, PSDKU) of President University in Pekanbaru. The inauguration of the prospective campus building took place at Plaza The Central Building, 2nd Floor, Jalan Ahmad Yani No. 42A, on Friday, 3 November 2023. The inauguration ceremony was attended by Dr. (H.C.) Setyono Djuandi Darmono, Founder of President University; Prof. Dr. Ir. Budi Susilo Soepandji, DEA, Chairman of the President University Education Foundation; Sabrina Putri Salim, Chairperson of the Peputra Manggala Nusantara Foundation; Sarkawi Lim and Mariyana, members of the Foundation’s Board of Trustees; and Afdalisma, S.H., M.Pd., Head of LLDIKTI Region X. The PSDKU President University Pekanbaru is scheduled to offer two study programs, namely Information Technology and Information Systems, with student admissions commencing in the 2024/2025 academic year.

== Distance Learning Program ==
In 2026, President University expanded access to higher education through its World Campus initiative, offering undergraduate education through a flexible online learning and distance education system. Launched in August 2026, the initiative initially introduced the Management in Information System study program, with plans to expand its academic offerings in the future. The university’s distance learning initiative is designed to provide greater access to higher education for students who require flexibility in balancing their studies with professional and personal commitments, while supporting the development of industry-relevant competencies in the digital economy.

== Internationalisation ==
=== ICBFE ===
The International Conference on Family Business and Entrepreneurship (ICFBE) is an annual academic conference organized by the Faculty of Business at President University, focusing on research and practice in family business and entrepreneurship. The conference was first held in 2017 and has since served as a forum for scholars, business practitioners, and policymakers to share research findings and best practices. The 7th ICFBE was held from 30 November to 1 December 2023 in Kuching, Sarawak, Malaysia, and included participants and speakers from countries such as the United States, Australia, Hungary, India, South Korea, Malaysia, the Philippines, Slovenia, and Taiwan. Distinguished attendees at the 2023 opening ceremony included Ayman El Tarabhishy, Deputy State Secretary of Sarawak for Economic Planning and Development; Prof. Ki-chan Kim, International Chancellor of President University; Prof. Dr. Chairy S.E., M.M., Rector of President University; Prof. Datuk Mohamad Kadim, Vice Chancellor of Universiti Malaysia Sarawak; Datuk Muhammad Abdullah bin Haji Zaide, President and CEO of the International Council for Small Business; and Kyoo-il Jo, Mayor of Jinju, South Korea. In 2024, the 8th ICFBE was successfully held in Iloilo and Roxas City, Philippines, on 9–10 October 2024, with the theme Empowering Creativity and Innovation: Youth and Technopreneurship and featured speakers and participants from government, academia, and industry across multiple countries, further strengthening international collaboration on family business and entrepreneurial development.

=== Overseas Study ===
The Indonesian International Student Mobility Awards (IISMA) 2022 program, organized by the Directorate General of Higher Education, Research, and Technology, Ministry of Education, Culture, Research, and Technology of the Republic of Indonesia, is designed to provide Indonesian students with opportunities to undertake academic studies abroad. Students from President University who participated in the IISMA program included Alexandra Evelyne, a Management student from the 2020 cohort, and Nadya, a Management student from the 2019 cohort. Alexandra Evelyne pursued her studies at University College London, United Kingdom, while Nadya was admitted to the National Taiwan University of Science and Technology (NTUST) in Taiwan.

In addition, several alumni of President University have continued their studies overseas. Among them are Muhamad Rizki Nugraha Darma Nagara (also known as Deris) and Denisa Amelia Kawuryan, both graduates of the International Relations program from the 2015 cohort. They received scholarships through the Indonesia Endowment Fund for Education (Lembaga Pengelola Dana Pendidikan, LPDP) administered by the Ministry of Finance of the Republic of Indonesia. Muhamad Rizki Nugraha Darma Nagara pursued a master’s degree in the Master of Public Administration program at the School of International and Public Affairs (SIPA), Columbia University, United States, while Denisa Amelia Kawuryan undertook a master’s program in Master of Science in Sustainable Development at the University of Sussex, United Kingdom. President University has continued to support students and alumni in pursuing international study opportunities through government-funded mobility programs and overseas scholarship schemes.

=== International Partnership ===
1. Timor Leste President University has established cooperation with the Government of Timor-Leste, as evidenced by a visit from Jaime Andre Simoes, the Education Attaché of Timor-Leste to Indonesia, to the President University student dormitory on 8 December 2023. During the visit, he was accompanied by active students from Timor-Leste who also serve as the chairperson of the President University Timorese Student Association (PUTSA). In addition, President University collaborates with the Fundo de Desenvolvimento do Capital Humano (FDCH), also known as the Human Capital Development Fund of Timor-Leste, to provide scholarships for young people from Timor-Leste to pursue higher education at the university.
2. Jinju City Government President University has also cooperated with the Government of Jinju, South Korea. The collaboration was formalized through the signing of a Memorandum of Understanding (MoU) between the Rector of President University, Prof. Dr. Chairy, S.E., M.M., and the Mayor of Jinju, Kyoo-il Jo. The partnership was marked by the seminar titled “Entrepreneurship Seminar: Sharing Insights on Korean Youth Entrepreneurship and Humane Entrepreneurship”, held on 28 November 2023 at the Charles Himawan Auditorium, President University campus in Cikarang, Bekasi. The seminar featured international speakers Dr. Ayman El Tarabishy, President and CEO of the International Council for Small Business (ICSB), and Kyoo-il Jo, Mayor of Jinju.
3. K-Food Institute President University and Sungshin Women’s University, South Korea, inaugurated the Korean Food Institute (K-Food Institute) on 13 March 2023. The inauguration took place at SetSail BizAccel – President University Business Accelerator, located in the Jababeka Industrial Estate, Cikarang. The opening ceremony was marked by a ribbon-cutting conducted jointly by Prof. Ki-chan Kim, International Chancellor of President University; Prof. Seong Keun Yi, President of Sungshin Women’s University; and Prof. Dr. Chairy, S.E., M.M., Rector of President University.
4. INTI University Malaysia President University also partners with INTI International University in Malaysia through an ongoing Mobility Study Program, which enables students, particularly from the Faculty of Engineering’s Civil Engineering Department, to study at INTI International University as part of their curriculum. The collaboration includes multiple student cohorts participating in international coursework alongside peers from South Asia, Central Asia, and Africa, as well as planned exchanges of lecturers between the two institutions. The second batch of the program was scheduled for August 2025, involving students from various disciplines and expanding academic exchange opportunities.

=== International Student Enrollment ===
According to data from the official Indonesian government portal izinbelajar.kemendikbud.go.id released by the Directorate of Institutional Affairs at the Ministry of Education and Culture, President University has consistently attracted a significant proportion of international undergraduate students studying in Indonesia. In 2017, 6.9% of all foreign students enrolled in undergraduate programs in Indonesia chose President University. This proportion increased to 7.2% in 2018 and further to 8.3% in 2019. In 2020, no foreign students were recorded enrolling in undergraduate programs in Indonesia, likely due to travel restrictions amid the COVID-19 pandemic. In 2021, out of 3,896 foreign students studying in Indonesia, 5.3% opted to continue their studies at President University. The percentage rose again in 2022, with 8.8% of foreign students in the country choosing President University as their academic destination.

More recent data from 2025 indicate that President University remains one of the most internationalized universities in Indonesia. Based on the IzinBelajar platform of the Ministry of Education, Science and Technology, out of 5,628 foreign students currently enrolled at universities across Indonesia, 439 students (approximately 7.8%) are studying at President University, representing the highest number of active international students at any Indonesian university. These students come from at least 13 countries, and when including alumni, the total number of represented nationalities exceeds 40.

== Student affairs ==
Student organizations at President University have their leadership structure, and constitution and can receive financial support from the institution, possibly through student activity fees. The Student Affairs Bureau of President University is responsible for fostering student organizations at President University. The student organizations consist of:

- President University Student Council (PUSC);
- President University Student Board (PUSB);
- President University Faculty Association (PUFA);
- President University Major Association (PUMA).

=== Achievement ===
The highest achievements attained by President University students at the international level were dominated by first-place awards and Gold Medals, reflecting the students’ global competitiveness. One of the most notable achievements was the Gold Medal at the World Invention Competition and Exhibition (WICE) 2025 in Malaysia, achieved by a student team consisting of three students from the Informatics Study Program and one student from the International Relations Study Program. The competition was attended by 673 international participants and became one of the most prestigious technology innovation events during the reporting year.

Another leading international achievement was demonstrated through the Global Start-up Design Thinking Hackathon Day 2025 organized by Chung-Ang University, South Korea. In this event, a student from the Informatics Study Program won first place, while a student from the Management Study Program received an honorable mention, demonstrating the capacity of President University students in innovation, design thinking, and interdisciplinary global collaboration.

President University has students with achievements at both the national and international levels. The following is a list of these achievements:

- Two President University students from Informatics and Industrial Engineering Study Program received individual awards at the international-level Global Mattel Internship Project Competition.
- A student from President University's Informatics Study Program won the Gold Medal in Mathematics at the 2026 National Olympiad of Mathematics and Natural Sciences (ONMIPA) at the national level, held at Universitas Airlangga.
- A student team from President University's Environmental Engineering Study Program won second place in the International Business Plan Competition with an environmental theme. The competition was attended by 160 participants from various countries.
- A student from the Law Study Program won second place at the 6th Asia Pacific Hayashi-ha Shitoryukai International Karate Championship at the international level.
- A student from the Law Study Program won third place at the 51st AP International Karate Open Championship at the international level with participation from more than 1,000 international athletes.
- A student from the International Relations Study Program won third place in the Singapore Model United Nations competition at the international level.
- A student from the International Relations Study Program participated in the ASEAN Future Innovators Challenge at the international level.
- A student from the International Relations Study Program won first place in the Indonesian Youth Excursion Network at the international level.
- A student from the Law Study Program won third place at the 51AP International Karate Open Championship at the international level.
- A student from the Law Study Program won third place at the International Pakuan Karate Championship at the international level.
- A student from the International Relations Study Program received recognition at the Northern Luzon Intervarsity event at the international level.
- A student from the Law Study Program won second place at the Asia Pacific Karate Championship at the international level.
- A student from the International Relations Study Program won third place in the International Youth Goals competition at the international level.
- A student from the Electrical Engineering Study Program won first place at Student Awarding Night at the international level.
- A student from the Management Study Program received recognition at Global Start-Up Hackathon 2025 at the international level.
- A student from the Law Study Program participated in Alphasight Business Case HK at the international level.
- A student from the Architecture Study Program participated in the 120 Hours Competition at the international level.
- A student from the Informatics Study Program received an achievement award at the China–ASEAN AI Competition at the international level.
- A student team from the Architecture Study Program received an achievement award at the 120 Hours Architectural Student Competition 2025 at the international level.
- A student from the International Relations Study Program received an achievement award at Sejuta Cita Future Leaders Chapter 9 Japan at the international level.
- A student team from the Environmental Engineering Study Program won second place in the International Business Plan Competition at the international level.
- A student from the Informatics Study Program received an achievement award at the Market Supervision Service Innovation Application Competition at the international level.
- A student from the Architecture Study Program participated in the 120 Hours Architectural Student Competition 2025 at the international level.
- A student from the Architecture Study Program participated in the Kaira Looro 2025 Architecture Competition at the international level.
- A student from the International Relations Study Program participated in the ASEAN Quotes Writing Competition at the international level.
- A student from the International Relations Study Program won first place in the Best Performance during Orientation category at the INTI International Competition at the international level.
- A student team consisting of three students from the Informatics Study Program and one student from the International Relations Study Program won first place and received the Gold Medal at the World Invention Competition and Exhibition 2025 at the international level.
- A student from the Actuarial Science Study Program won second place at the Economics Innovation on Scientific Competition at the international level.
- A student from the Interior Design Study Program won third place at Talent Camp Asia 2025 at the international level.
- A student from the Master of Technology Study Program won first place at the International Conference on Economic and Development Studies at the international level.
- A student from the Industrial Engineering Study Program participated in the ISEEC UI Mini Case Competition at the international level.
- A student from the Master of Technology Study Program received an achievement award at the Business Competition TUM at the international level.
- A student team from the Electrical Engineering Study Program won first place at the International Hackathon Golden Code at the international level.
- A student from the Informatics Study Program won first place at the 2025 Global Start-up Design Thinking Hackathon Day at the international level.
- A student from the Informatics Study Program won second place at the 2025 Global Stay-up Competition at the international level.
- A student from the Communication Science Study Program won first place at the Youth Leaders Exchange & Conference 2025 Malaysia & Singapore at the international level.
- A student team from the Civil Engineering Study Program won first place at the Temporary Disaster Shelter Frame Competition at the international level.
- The Debate Team from President University won first place in a national inter-university debate competition in Indonesia on 20 October 2024, marking a significant achievement in student debating at the national level.
- Four students from President University won multiple awards at the Global Hackathon Startup Competition held in South Korea from 24 to 26 September 2024, securing Gold, Silver, Bronze, and Special Prizes** across different competition categories.
- The Dexter Team from the President University Management Study Program secured second place in the 2021 HSBC Business Case Competition.
- Students from the President University International Relations program achieved 1st Runner-Up in the Asian Youth Speech Contest in Thailand. They were also named Champions of the Naradipta EO Speech Competition at Yogyakarta State University.
- The Mechanical Engineering students from President University passed the 2021 Indonesian Student Entrepreneurship Program (PKMI) Selection in the Indonesian Student Entrepreneurship Activities (KBMI) category.
- A Law student was selected as a finalist for the West Java Language Ambassador 2021.
- Business Administration students represented Banten Province in the Triathlon sport at PON XX Papua 2021 and participated in the Aquathlon event, organized by the Indonesian Banten Triathlon Federation.
- The Industrial Engineering student team secured First Place in the International Competition, Industrial Engineering Scientific Competition (IESC) 2021.
- Another team from the Mechanical Engineering program won first place in the 2021 Otodesign National CAD design competition at the Jember State Polytechnic.
- Students from the Management study program received the XL Future Leaders (XLFL) scholarship.
- Information Systems students achieved runner-up position at the 2022 ASEAN Indonesia Entrepreneurship World Cup (EWC).
- International Relations students achieved remarkable success in various Model United Nations (MUN) Events.
- The Industrial Engineering student team secured second place in the 2017 Industrial Engineering Competition (IECA).

=== IISMA ===
Indonesian International Student Mobility Award (IISMA) is a government scholarship program administered by the Directorate General of Higher Education, Research and Technology of the Ministry of Education, Culture, Research, and Technology of the Republic of Indonesia. It funds Indonesian students to undertake study abroad for one semester at internationally recognized universities. The program covers tuition and registration fees, transportation allowance, living expenses, health insurance, and visa support for participants.

President University students have consistently participated in the IISMA program and several have been selected as awardees. In 2021, five President University students were awarded IISMA scholarships to study abroad.

In 2024, the number of President University students selected for the IISMA program increased significantly, with 17 students from various faculties and study programs participating—representing an approximate 70% increase compared to the previous year. These students attended universities across Australia, the United States, Europe, New Zealand, Taiwan, and Japan, with faculty representation from Computer Science, Business, Humanities, and Engineering.

Among IISMA 2024 awardees, students from the Actuarial Science program included Zievan Ananta, who studied at University of Pécs in Hungary, and Sekar Ayu, who studied at Humboldt University in Germany, expanding President University’s global academic engagement.

== Events at President University ==
President University organizes various events, including seminars, cultural festivals, and social activities. The following is a list of selected events held at President University.

=== President University Ambassador Lecture Series ===
The President University Ambassador Lecture Series is a series of international guest lectures organized by President University as part of its efforts to broaden students’ perspectives on international relations and diplomacy. One edition of the series was held on 25 April 2025, featuring H.E. Galma Mukhe Boru, Ambassador of Kenya to Indonesia, who delivered a public lecture on Indonesia–Kenya bilateral relations and global cooperation dynamics. The event included academic discussions and a question-and-answer session between students and diplomatic representatives, and forms part of the university’s internationalization strategy.

=== President University Lyrics Unplugged ===
President University Lyrics Unplugged (PULU) is a music and arts event organized by President University as a platform for student creative expression. The event features acoustic music performances, solo vocals, and band collaborations by students and members of the academic community. One edition of PULU was held in 2025 and coordinated by the Faculty of Medicine of President University, adopting a relaxed performance concept that combines music, art, and campus community engagement. The event aims to promote artistic appreciation and creativity within the academic environment.

=== President University International Dinner ===
President University International Dinner is an annual event organized by President University to strengthen relationships between local and international students. The event includes a communal dinner, cultural performances from various countries, and intercultural interaction activities aimed at promoting diversity and tolerance on campus. The International Dinner serves as a celebration of multiculturalism at President University, which hosts a diverse international student community.

=== Pre-University Program ===
The Pre-University Program (Pre-Uni), also known as a matriculation program, is an academic orientation program organized by President University as part of its new student admission process. The Pre-Uni program is conducted over a period of two weeks.

=== Cultural Event ===
The **Cultural Festival** is one of President University’s annual events aimed at introducing cultural diversity from various regions of Indonesia and strengthening relationships between local and international students. The event is held annually over two days and is attended by students from across the university.

The festival features performances by President University students presenting their respective cultures, including national and international dances, singing, retro dance, moral storytelling, fashion shows, Madagascar dance, duet singing, contemporary dance, Nusantara medleys, and band performances.

=== Mr and Ms President University ===
Mr. & Ms. President University is an internal annual event organized by the President University Student Board (PUSB). The event aims to select student ambassadors who represent positive character and values within the campus and the wider community.

The program includes a series of character development activities such as quarantine sessions and training programs, including public speaking, particularly focusing on answering questions during interview sessions. Participants are also trained in ethical behavior both offline and online. The event seeks not only to select campus ambassadors but also to establish role models for the entire student body. The 2020 edition emphasized the concept of **3B + 1T**: *Brain, Beauty, Behaviour, and Talent*.

=== Resume and LinkedIn Expo ===
President University organizes the Resume, LinkedIn, and Fashion Expo through its Internship and Career Center (ICC) to support students’ career readiness and professional development. The event provides resume reviews, LinkedIn profile consultations, and guidance on personal branding and professional attire. The 2025 edition was held from 29 July to 1 August at the university’s main campus in Jababeka and was attended by hundreds of students from various study programs. The event involved university leaders, faculty members, alumni, and external professionals who provided feedback on students’ resumes, online professional profiles, and career preparation. It also featured a Fashion for Professionals component focusing on professional dress and workplace presentation as part of students’ career development. In July 2026, the university held the fourth edition of the event, organized by the Internship and Career Center, from 7 to 10 July at the Charles Himawan Auditorium. The four-day program included individual consultations with alumni on resumes and LinkedIn profiles, career insights, mock interviews, and professional development.

=== President University Archery Club ===
The President University Archery Club (PUAC) is one of the university’s 32 student clubs and communities. It was officially inaugurated in 2018 by Dr. Agus Canny, M.A., M.Sc., Vice Rector for Student Affairs and Alumni of President University. The club aims to foster student achievement in archery sports.

PUAC received support from Purnomo Siswoprasetjo, President and CEO of the **Pacific Asia Tourism Association (PATA) Indonesia, to organize the President University Archery Championship in 2019. The championship is a national-level archery competition organized by the President University Archery Club in collaboration with **D’khayangan Archery Center (DAC)** and the **Indonesian Archery Association (PERPANI)**. The archery club has at least **40 student members**.
