= Jababeka Group =

Indonesian industrial estate developer

PT Kawasan Industri Jababeka Tbk
- Trade name: Jababeka & Co.
- Type: Public (Perseroan terbatas)
- Traded as: IDX: KIJA
- Industry: Real estate, commercial property, infrastructure, leisure, education
- Founded: 1989
- Founders: Setyono Djuandi Darmono, Hadi Rahardja (co-founder)
- Headquarters: Cikarang, Indonesia
- Key people: Setyono Djuandi Darmono
- Products: Industrial Estate, Residential Estate, Central Business District, Dry Port, Golf & Country Club, Education Park
- Revenue: Rp 2.930 billion (2016)
- Net income: Rp 426,5 billion (2016)
- Total assets: Rp 10,733.5 billion (2016)
- Owner: Mu'min Ali Gunawan (21.1%); Islamic Development Bank (11.7%)
- Number of employees: 1,634 (2016)
- Website: www.jababeka.com

PT Kawasan Industri Jababeka Tbk (lit. 'Jababeka Industrial Estate plc'), trading as Jababeka & Co., is the first publicly listed industrial estate developer in Indonesia, being listed on the Jakarta and Surabaya Stock Exchange under the "KJIA" ticker symbol in 1994. It was established in 1989 by Setyono Djuandi Darmono, marked by the development of an integrated city in some 5,600 hectares of land which is Kota Jababeka in Cikarang. As an industrial estate developer, Jababeka creates an industry-based township through developing industrial, residential, commercial property, leisure, infrastructure and estate management service.

== History and milestones ==
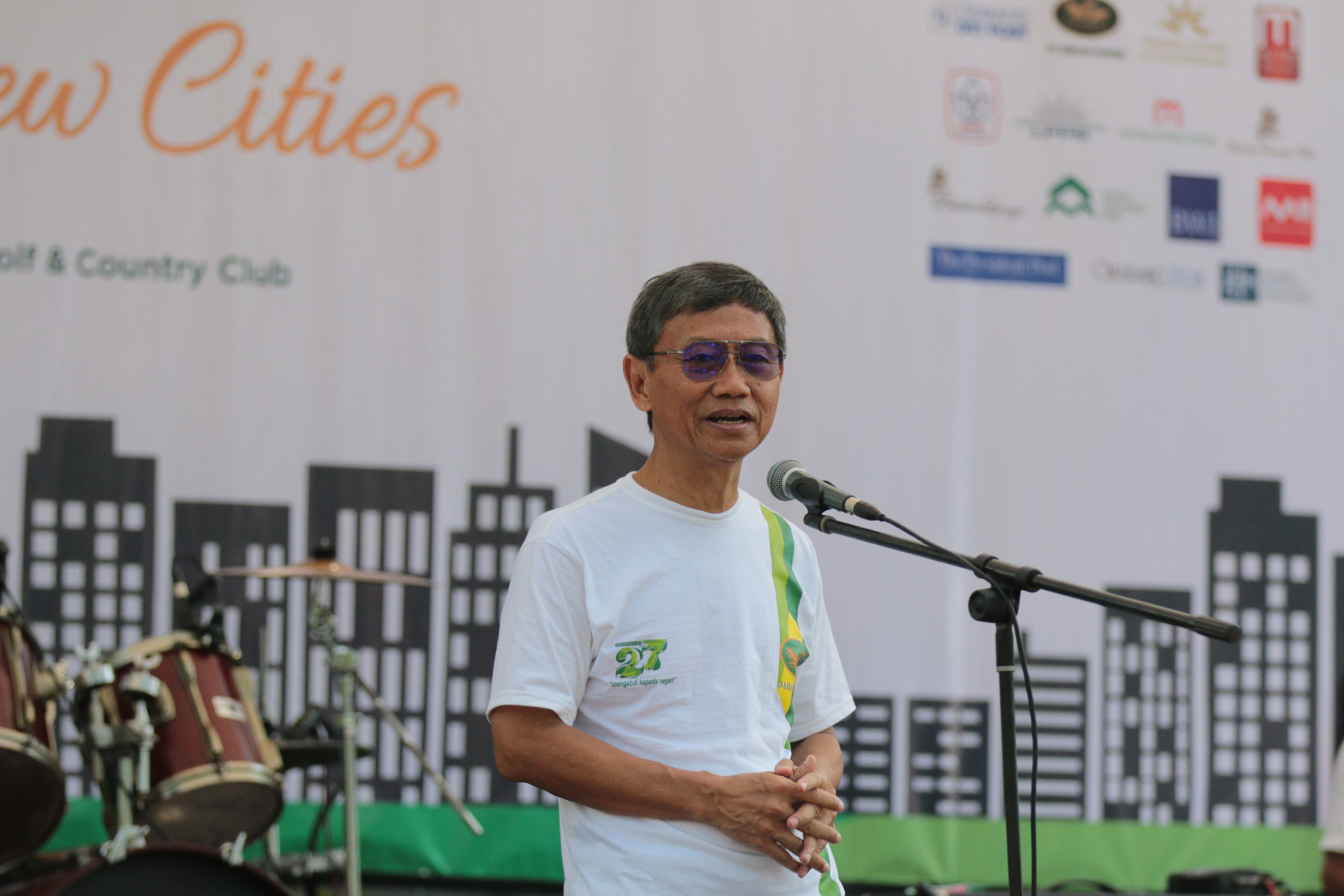
Jababeka's founder S.D. Darmono on Jababeka's 16th birthday

PT Jababeka Tbk was established in 1989. In the same year, the development of industrial estate took place in Cikarang, known as Jababeka Industrial Estate, while the residential estate was started being developed three years later. In 1994, PT Jababeka Tbk was listed on Jakarta and Surabaya stock exchange, making it the first publicly listed industrial estate developer in Indonesia. Then in 1996, there were acquisitions of Menara Batavia in Jakarta CBD and also 1,000 ha industrial land in Cilegon, Banten. Still in the same year, PT Jababeka Tbk inaugurated the Jababeka Golf and Country Club in Jababeka. Then in 2001, there was inauguration of Education Park, including President University.

Development was still going on with the next project was the development of Jababeka Central Business District (CBD) in Cikarang in the year of 2003, and continued with the groundbreaking of 130 MW Power Plant project in 2007 as well as Medical City in 2008. Besides the power plant, another infrastructure developed was the dry port. Cikarang Dry Port started operations in 2010 and appointed as an Integrated Customs Services Zone with international port code IDJBK. In 2011, PT Jababeka Tbk acquired 1,500 ha land in Tanjung Lesung, Banten. Next development was the Kendal Industrial Estate in Central Java while in Jababeka, Bekasi Power started operating in 2013. By 2014 PT Jababeka Tbk achieved over IDR 2.5 trillion in revenue. In 2015, development of US$1 billion Plaza Indonesia Jababeka township project was begun.

== Products and services ==
=== Industrial ===
The Jababeka Industrial Estate in Kota Jababeka, Cikarang, Bekasi, West Java is the first modern Indonesian eco-industrial estate and jointly developed with ProLH GTZ under a technical cooperation program collaboratively established by Indonesia's Ministry of Environment and the Republic of Germany. The industrial estate includes industrial land lot, built-to suit factories, Biz Park Jababeka and logistic buildings. It spans in more than 2,000 hectares of land and contains more than 1,650 local and multinational corporations from 30 countries, such as United States, Japan, France, United Kingdom, the Netherlands, Australia, Korea, Singapore, Taiwan, and Malaysia.

=== Residential ===
Jababeka’s Residential Estate is set in the heart of Kota Jababeka, Cikarang, Bekasi, West Java where professionals who work in Jababeka's Industrial Estate reside. The development of the residential estate known as Jababeka Residence started back in 1992. It lies on a 1,400 hectares land and consists of around 50,000 housing units catering for all social strata as it comprises various types of residential clusters.

=== Commercial ===
Jababeka's commercial products include commercial plots of land, shophouses, office and commercial space for rent which is located in Kota Jababeka, Cikarang, Bekasi, West Java. The Jababeka Central Business District contains various commercial facilities which are shops, restaurants and banks. This area is commonly used by youngsters from local schools and universities, faculty members, entrepreneurs, professionals and many others to have social interactions.

=== Infrastructure ===
Infrastructures in Jababeka are built to support the growth of its estates. The power plant which is managed by PT Bekasi Power, a subsidiary of PT Jababeka Tbk, supports the continuity of Uninterruptible Power Supply (UPS) operation for seven industrial estates in eastern Jakarta, especially Jababeka industrial area. It also cooperates with the state electricity company or Perusahaan Listrik Negara (PLN) to support government programs in electricity distribution in Bekasi and Karawang’s industrial areas. Another infrastructure developed by Jababeka is the dry port called Cikarang Dry Port which allows import-export customs clearance to be resolved within the Jababeka industrial area. Besides the power plant and the dry port, Jababeka develops water treatment plant units as well as waste water management.

=== Estate management ===
In addition to the water and waste water treatment plant, Jababeka provides network of fiber optics powered by PT Telkom Indonesia, PT. Indonesia Comnet Plus (Icon+) dan PT Indosat. Jababeka has invested in road improvement and drainage services program, in-house fire brigade and fire hydrants, 24-hour security, public lighting and public transportation, all of which fall under Jababeka's estate management services.

=== Leisure and hospitality ===
Some products of Jababeka's leisure and hospitality are Jababeka Golf and Country Club, Borobudur International Golf & Country Club, President Lounge, Metro Suites and Metro Hotel.

== Corporate affairs and identity ==
=== Facts and figures ===
Jababeka was established in 1989. One of the major works of Jababeka is Kota Jababeka in Cikarang, Bekasi, West Java. As of 2017 Jababeka employs more than 700,000 workers and 10,000 expatriates in order to support the creation of employment opportunities in Indonesia. Jababeka becomes home base to some tenants which are Loreal, ICI Paints, Mattel, Samsung, Unilever, United Tractors, Akzo Nobel and Nissin Mas.

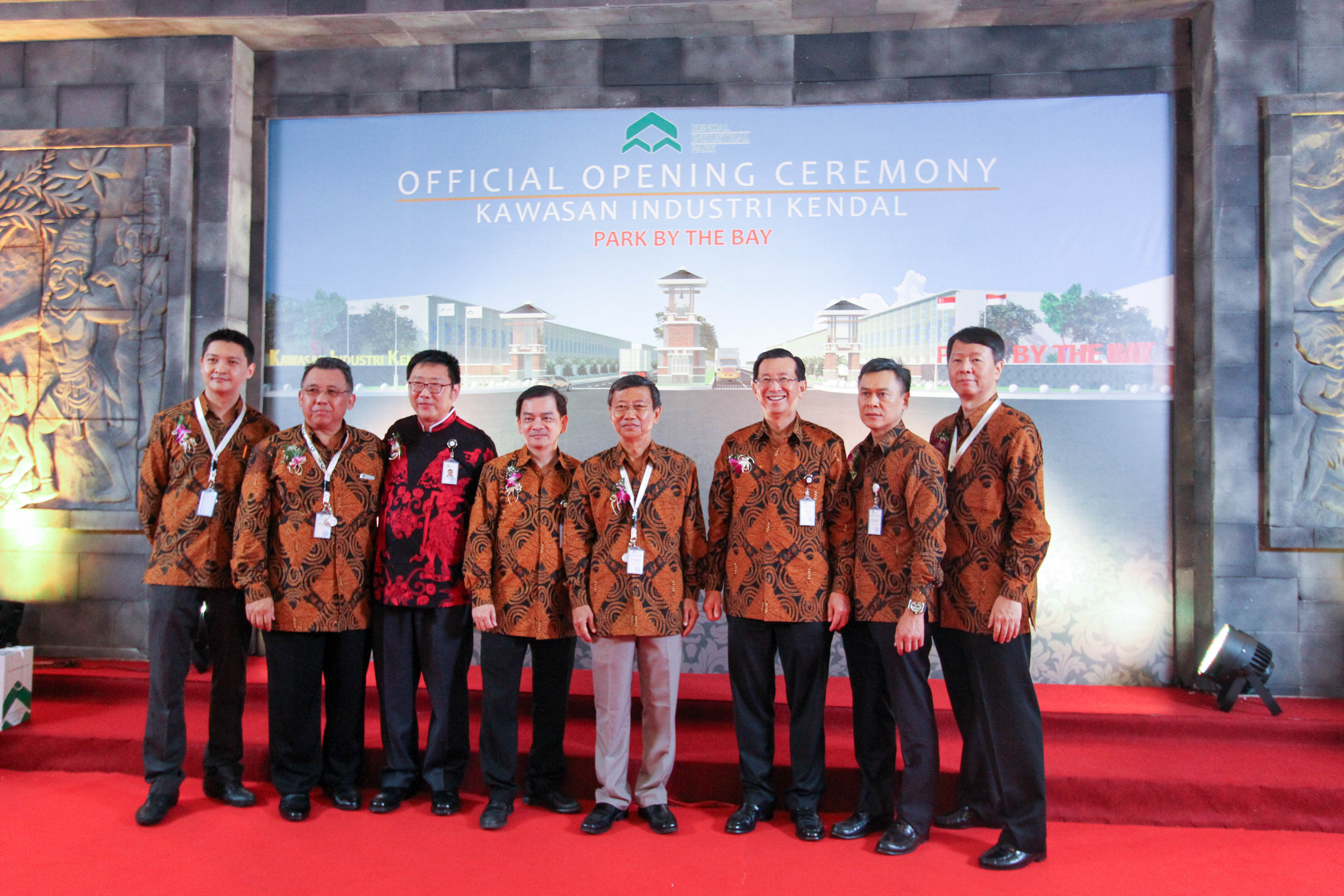
Jababeka's founder S.D. Darmono on Kendal Industrial Estate's opening ceremony

Besides Kota Jababeka in Cikarang, Jababeka continues working with keen regional governments in Indonesia to develop more cities. Ongoing projects are Kota Jababeka, Tanjung Lesung (Tanjung Lesung SEZ), Kendal (Kendal Industrial Estate), Morotai (Jababeka Morotai SEZ) and Cilegon. Potential cities to be developed are Bengkulu, Cirebon, Tuban/Madura, Banda Aceh, Medan, Sei Mangkei, Padang, Bintan, Bangka Belitung, Yogyakarta, Pontianak, Balikpapan, Tuban, Bitung, Palu, Takalar, Ende, Flores, Ambon, Sorong, Kaimana.

=== Management team ===
==== Board of commissioners ====
- Setyono Djuandi Darmono – Chairman & Founder
- Hadi Rahardja – Co-Chairman & Founder
- Bacelius Ruru – Vice President Commissioner / Independent Commissioner
- Gan Michael – Commissioner
- Ketut Budi Wijaya – Commissioner / Independent Commissioner

==== Board of directors ====
- T. Budianto Liman – President Director
- Hyanto Wihadhi – Director
- Sutedja Sidarta Darmono – Director
- Tjahjadi Rahardja – Director
- Setiawan Mardjuki – Director

=== Subsidiaries ===
- PT Jababeka Infrastruktur
- PT Gerbang Teknologi Cikarang
- PT Bekasi Power
- PT Cikarang Inland Port
- PT Indokargomas Persada
- PT Metropark Condominium Indah
- PT Jababeka Morotai
- PT Graha Buana Cikarang
- PT Padang Golf Cikarang
- PT Saranapratama Pengembangan Kota
- PT Mercuagung Graha Realty
- PT Banten West Java Tourism Development
- PT Tanjung Lesung Leisure Industry
- Jababeka International BV
- Jababeka Finance BV

=== Corporate social responsibility ===
==== Economic empowerment ====
Jababeka works with Small and Medium Enterprises (SME) to increase their capabilities to earn income, and encourages small organic farmers to succeed in the agribusiness sector. Moreover, Jababeka also assists with general infrastructure development and repairs, particularly of waterworks and roads, to support quality of life for residents of local communities.

==== Social welfare ====
Jababeka provides free medical services for the underprivileged, supports government health programmes, helps construct and renovate schools and libraries, and gives scholarships to high achieving underprivileged children.

==== Environment ====
Jababeka has established an 11-ha Botanic Garden to help preserve biodiversity and serve as green "lungs" for the surrounding residents.

=== Awards ===
- Supply Chain Asia Awards 2014 – Asia Logistics Centre/Park of the Year Cikarang Dry Port
- Frontier Consulting Group Award – Rank #1 Corporate Image 2014 in category Industrial Estate
- Fortune Indonesia – Ranks 10th in the 50 Fastest Growing Companies, 2013
- Kemenperin Award – he Best Performance in Infrastructure and Facilities, 2013
- Forbes Indonesia – Best Company Award, 2012
- Investor Magazine Award – Top 10 Best Performing Listed Companies and Best Listed Companies in Property and Building Construction, 2012
- PROPER Awards 2009 & 2011
- Green Property Awards 2011
- Green Property Award 2009
- Indonesian CSR Award 2008
- Participation and Support for Housing Development Award, 2008
- Laboratory Examiner Award, 2008
