= Bekasi Power =

Company of Indonesia

Coordinates: 6°16′10.8″S 107°9′35.1″E

PT Bekasi Power

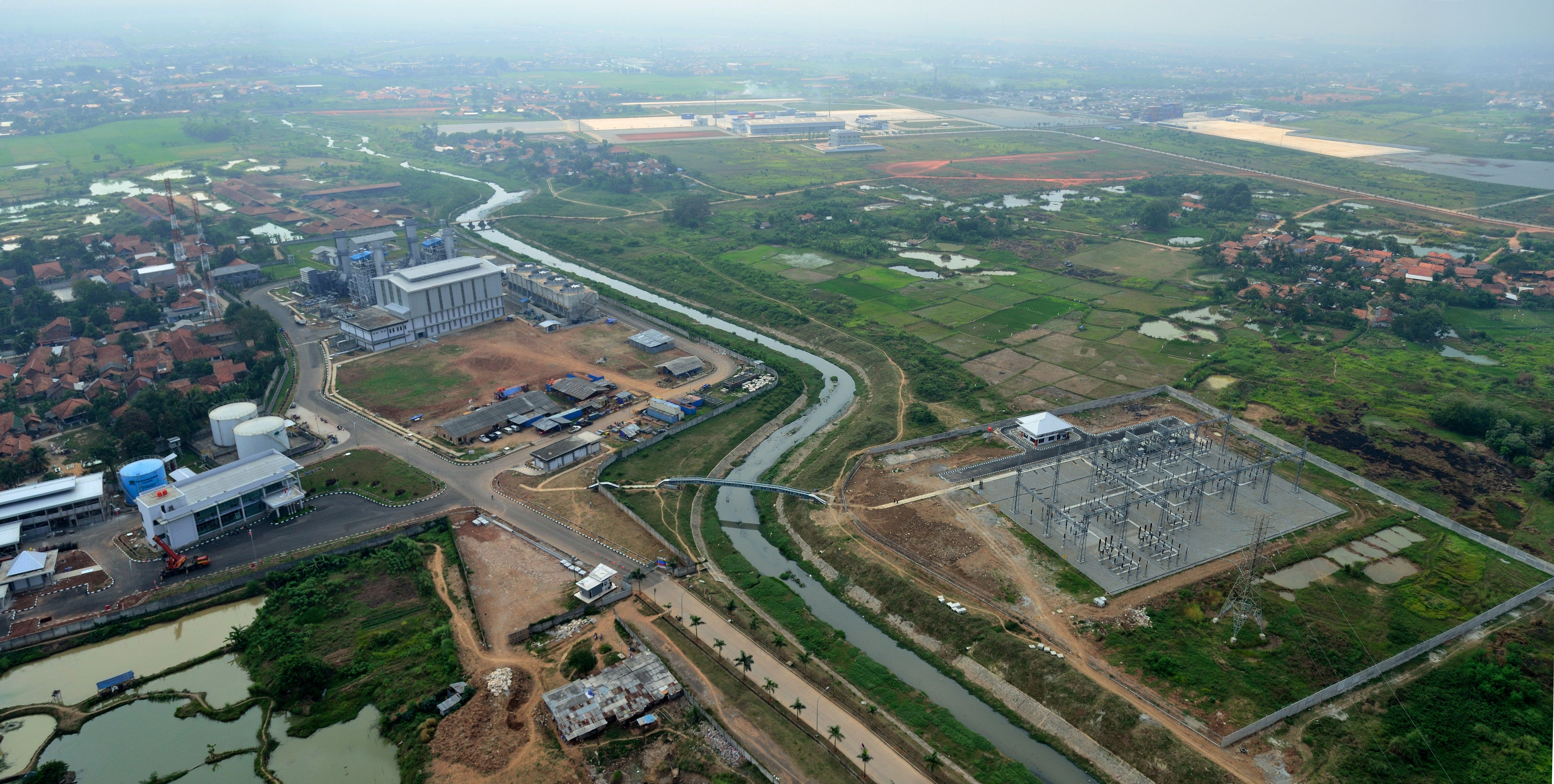
- Bekasi Power plant
- Type: Private
- Industry: Energy
- Headquarters: Cikarang, Indonesia
- Products: Power plant
- Parent: Jababeka Group

PT Bekasi Power is a power plant located in West Java, Indonesia. It is a subsidiary of PT Jababeka Tbk which was established in 2007. As a 130 megawatt (MW) power plant generated by steam and gas (PLTGU), it strengthens Bekasi – Karawang electricity system through Cibatu substation owned by PT Perusahaan Listrik Negara (PLN). This state-owned company can only meet the needs of about 60 percent. To meet the rest, private sector needs to get involved. A reliable and sustainable electricity supply with an international standard is a must for an industrial estate. Bekasi Power plant is therefore constructed to guarantee Uninterruptible Power Supply (UPS) for a total of seven industrial zones including Jababeka. By delivering reliable electricity at a competitive price, this plant supports Jababeka business as well as surrounding areas, boosting Indonesia's power capacity and industrial growth for the upcoming years.

== Government and private by collaboration ==
The cooperation between Bekasi Power and PLN is considered as a contribution to government's program. Through the scheme of cooperation all electricity will be purchased by PT Perusahaan Listrik Negara (PLN) at a price of Rp 1,050 per kilowatt hour (kWh). The scheme lasts for 20 years. Later, the electricity will be redistributed to Jababeka Industrial Estate and its surroundings. PLTGU Bekasi Power, according to the Managing Director, is generated by gas supplied by state-owned companies i.e. PT Pertamina and PT Perusahaan Gas Negara (PGN). Each day, the supplied gas needed is 23 million BTU (British Thermal Units). A BTU is a measure of the energy content in fuel, and is used in the power, steam generation, heating and air conditioning industries. Natural gas is usually measured in BTUs.

== Increasing the capacity ==
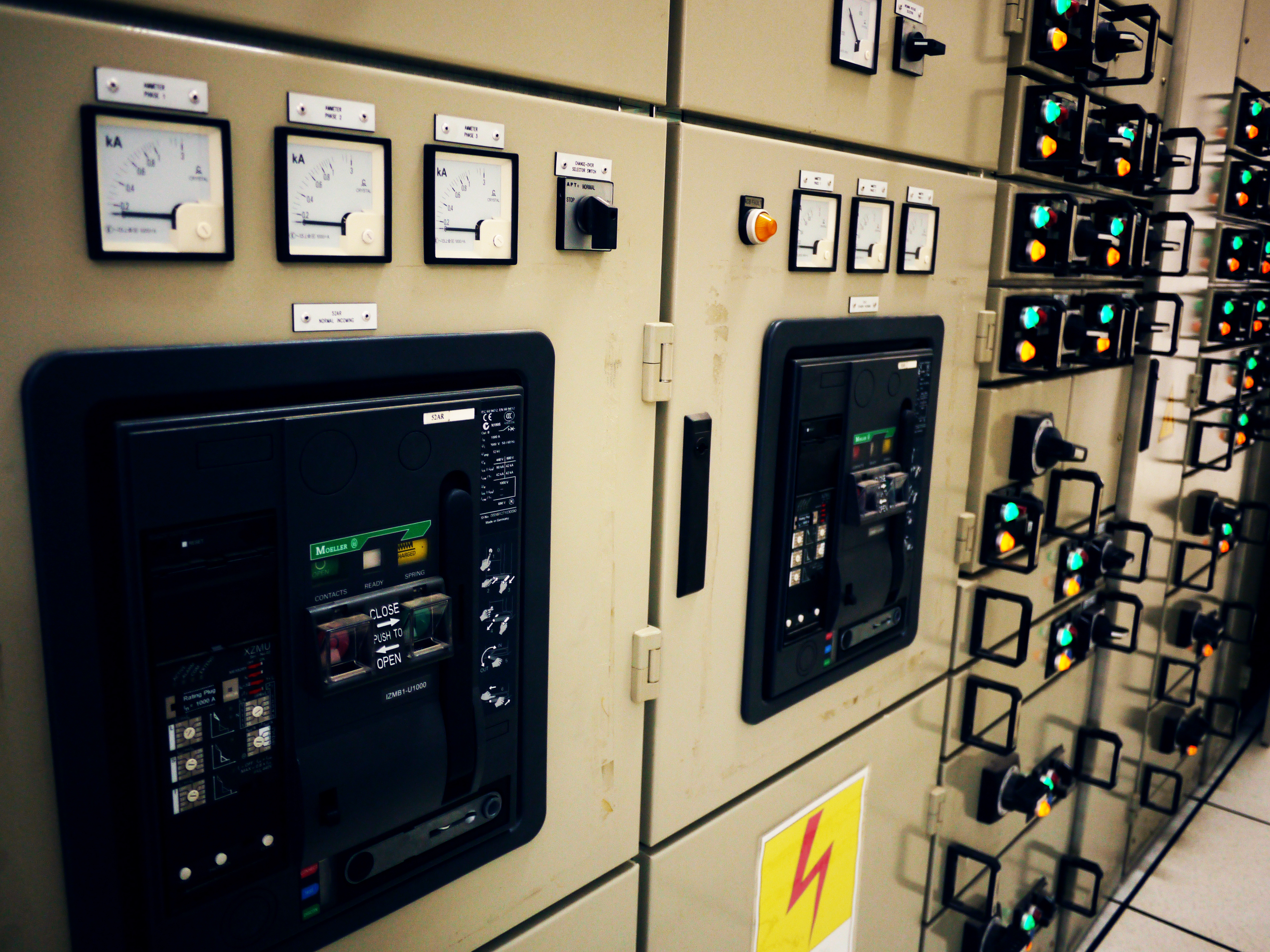
Bekasi Power Control Panel

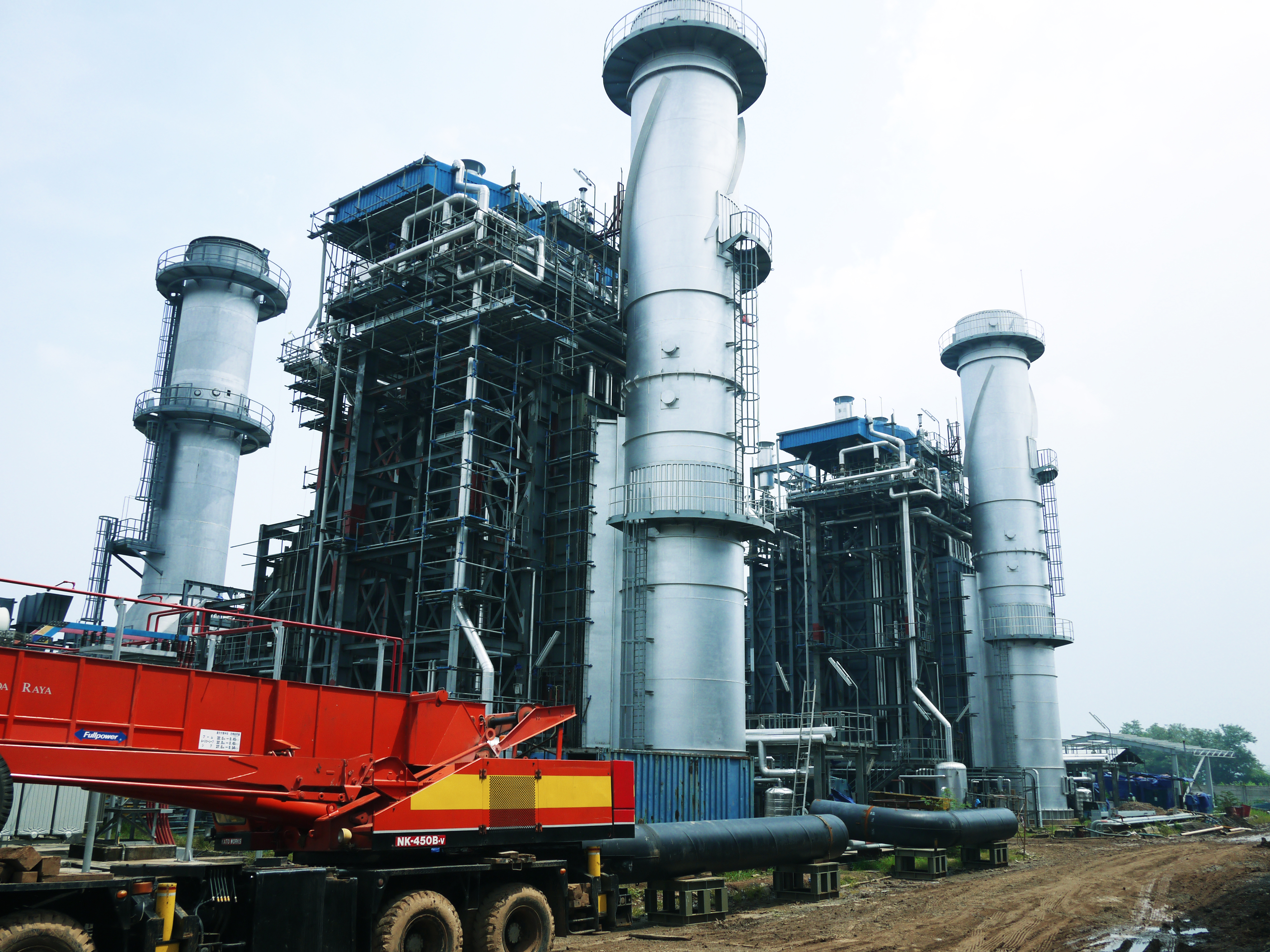
Bekasi Power Turbine

To anticipate the future demand, Jababeka as the holding company has anticipated that soon the capacity shall be increased. In order to build and double the capacity, a sufficient land has been prepared to accommodate the increased capacity from currently 130 MW to 2 x 130 MW.

Future investors definitely need certainty to make sure their business works well. Therefore, industrial estate with complete infrastructure will surely interest them. And when the government has limited capacity and resources to provide, it is the turn of the private sector to engage. The cooperation between PLN and PLTGU Bekasi Power is a solution to overcome these obstacles.

In term of manufacturing a power plant, private sector needs to see in broader scope. As the President Director's said: "We cannot solely rely on the sale of land, we need other income. One of them comes from the electricity sales to government." He also emphasized that the electricity sales turnover to PLN has resulted Rp. 1 trillion because 100% output will be absorbed by PLN.

== Expanding to other areas ==
Realizing the good prospect, the company is eager to grow the same business. It will continue to develop the same PLTGU project in several other areas. The areas that are now being observed are: the Special Economic Zone Tanjung Lesung, Kendal Industrial Estate, Cilegon and Morotai. They will also follow suit. If the area requires additional power supply then the construction of power plant will also be built to meet the energy needs.

In term of future development, Bekasi Power has a plan to double the capacity from currently 130 MW to 2 x 130 MW in 2020. Ten years later, in 2030, they plan to increase to 3 x130 MW as a Green & Sustainable Energy Power Plant. At that time they will support electricity for all aspects in Bekasi, Cikarang, and Karawang i.e. housing, traffic system, industrial park, International Trade Center, commercial area, etc.

== High demand from industrial estates ==
The demand for electricity for industrial estate is inevitable. This is reflected in the efforts of the Ministry of Industry which in the next five years plans to develop 15 new industrial areas which will be supported by electricity supply up to 11,064 MW. The government believes that to meet these needs, developers of each industrial estate must build their own power plants. They should not only rely on government power project plans but also to build their own factories.

A total of 11,064 megawatts will be allocated to 13 industrial estates outside Java as the government's priority programs for industrial acceleration. Two other areas are located in Java, namely in Gresik, East Java and in Demak, Central Java. The demand for electricity for each industrial estate is clearly different. As in Batulicin, for example. In an industrial area of 530 hectares in South Kalimantan province, electricity needs 2,650 MW. Compare it to Sayung Industrial Estate in Demak, Central Java which requires only 42 MW. Differences in electricity demand occur not only because of the condition of the region but also the allocation. For industrial zones that focus on processing and refining minerals clearly require more electricity than labor-intensive industries.

== Selling price ==
When a power plant is to be built in an industrial estate, it should also take into account the issue of price. According to the Chairman of the Indonesian Industrial State Association the imbalance between energy availability and the price offered is not a new issue. In general, entrepreneurs in industrial areas are currently getting prices stun above expectations. Electricity price of US$0.12 per kWh in Bantaeng Industrial Park, according to him, is still too expensive. The ideal price range for the industry is supposed to be US$0.08 –0.10 per kWh. Therefore, entrepreneurs must be careful in choosing the source of power to obtain the economic price.

== Import tax ==
Building a power plant by a private company will always be fully supported by the government of the Republic of Indonesia. One of its supports is to apply tax deductions when importing components from abroad. "Components of power plants that have not been produced domestically and must be imported, can be tax deductible to only 10%."
