= Kendal Industrial Estate =

PT Kawasan Industri Kendal
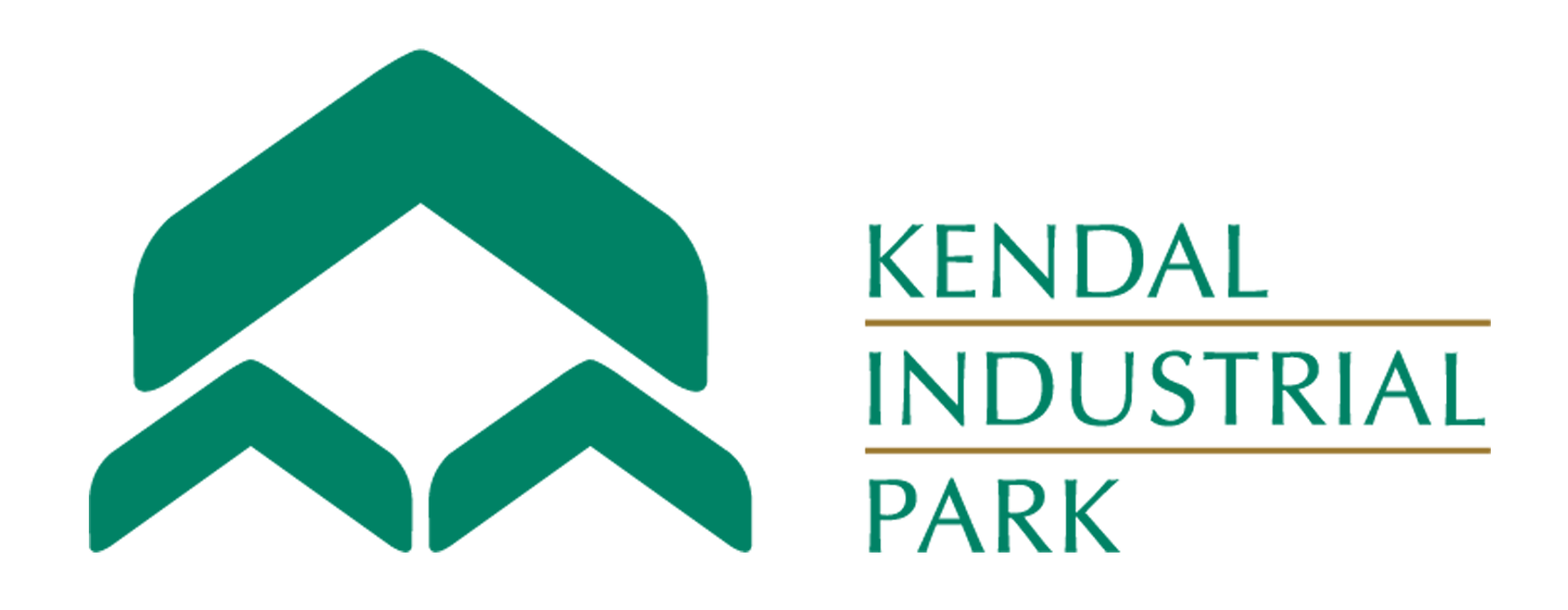
- Company type: Privately held company
- Industry: Real estate
- Founded: 14 November 2016
- Headquarters: Central Java, Indonesia
- Products: Industrial Estate, Residential Estate, Commercial Area
- Parent: Jababeka Group
- Website: kendalindustrialpark.co.id

Kendal Industrial Estate is an international industrial complex operated by PT Kawasan Industri Kendal and developed by PT Jababeka Tbk and Sembcorp Development Ltd as a bilateral cooperation between Indonesia and Singapore. It is located in Kendal district, Central Java province, Indonesia and was inaugurated on 14 November 2016 by the President of Republic of Indonesia, Joko Widodo, and the Prime Minister of Singapore, Lee Hsien Loong, in Semarang, Central Java, Indonesia. Having Jababeka Industrial Estate at Cikarang as a blueprint, Kendal Industrial Estate that is also known as Kendal Industrial Park by the Bay is designed as an industrial area combined with residential and commercial area. With a total area of 2,700 hectares, it is expected to provide up to 500,000 workers. Of the total land area, 860 hectares is plotted for infrastructure development consisting of power network, water treatment and waste management.

As an industry-based township, Kendal Industrial Estate supports manufacturers to raise their efficiency and productivity, and has impacts on improving local economy. This is achieved by offering options for quick startup or large land plots for area expansion which are factory ready to use, consisting of semi-permanent factory and terraced factory and also land ready to build for factory building. In terms of human resource, manufacturers can supply thousands of skillful labor force from local universities and vocational training institutes in Central Java. As a result, Kendal is to become a new magnet for local communities and Central Java.

The success of this industrial estate is important as it will guide the development of other industrial zones to Brebes and Rembang. The development of the industrial estate itself will be supported by the government in terms of simplifying of licensing, labor regulation, infrastructures such as electricity network and water supply. The Central Java provincial government seeks to integrate all the facilities built in Central Java in order to grow the economy and to facilitate the entry of new investors.

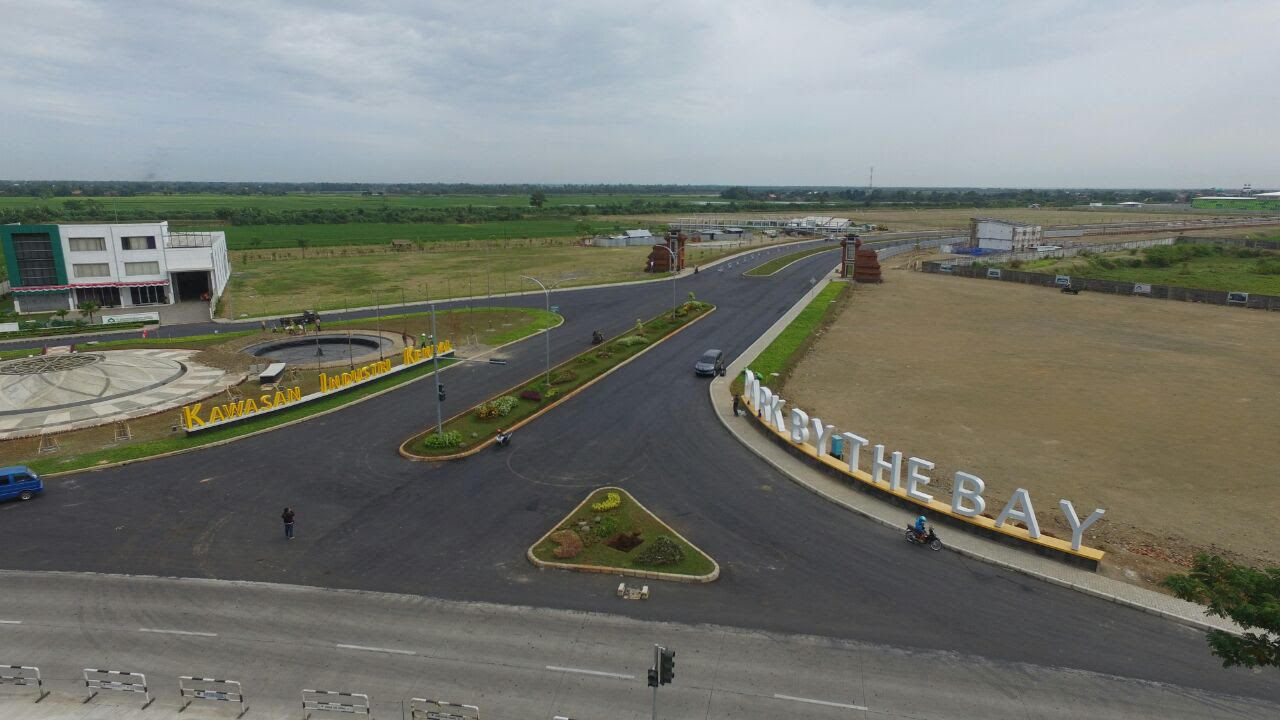
Kendal Industrial Estate

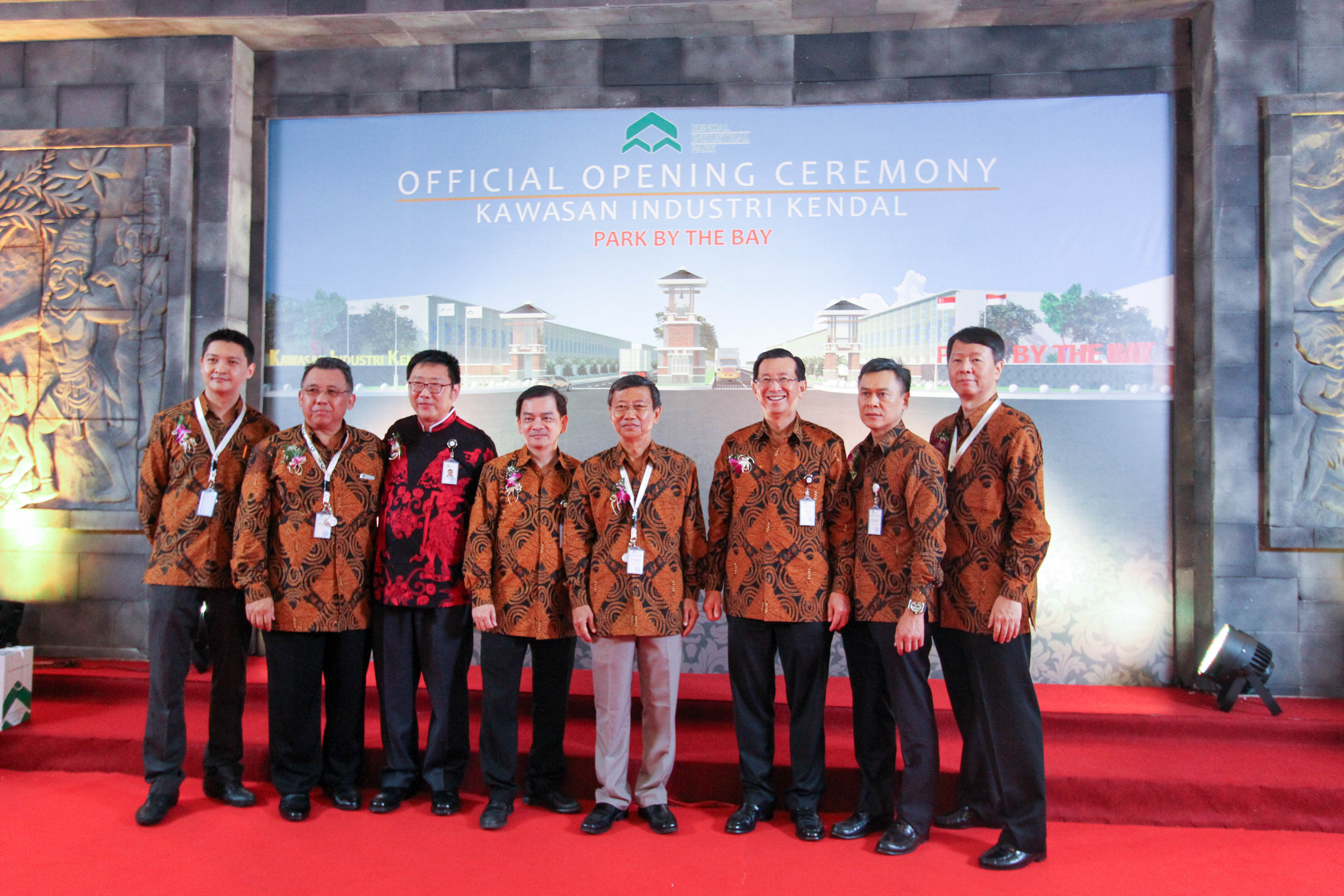
Kendal Industrial Estate's Opening Ceremony

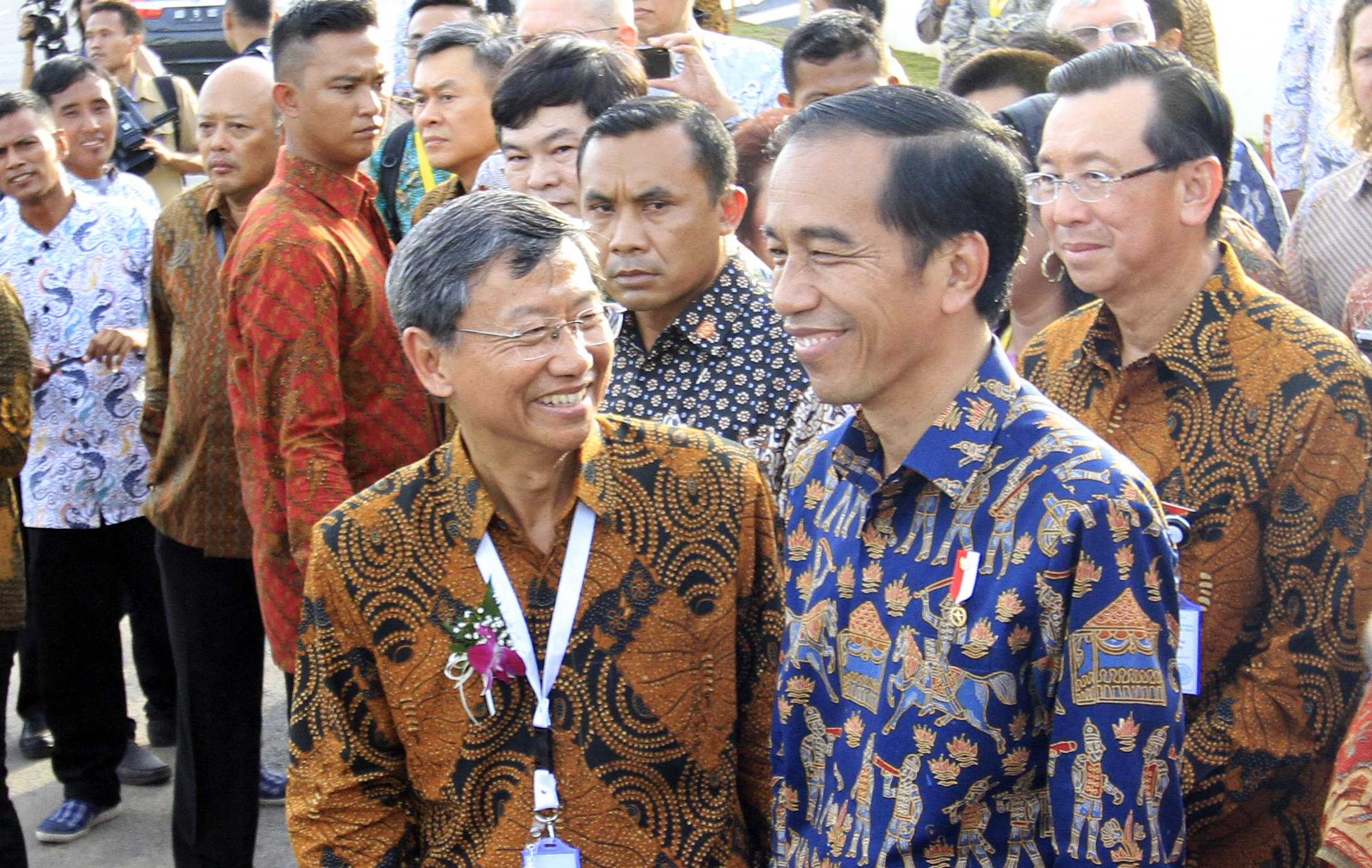
President Joko Widodo and Jababeka's Founder S.D. Darmono on Kendal Industrial Estate's Opening Ceremony

== Export ==
The development of Kendal Industrial Estate is focused on boosting the export volume especially in Central Java. Therefore, the companies in the industrial estate are export-oriented companies. In order to trigger the export growth, Indonesian state-owned enterprise Pelindo III prepares infrastructure in Tanjung Emas Port, Central Java in order to support the companies in the industrial estate to conduct export and import activities.

== Access ==
Kendal Industrial Estate has several ways of accessibility. It can be reached within 1 hour drive from Achmad Yani International Airport as well as from Tanjung Emas, the busiest port in Central Java province. From Semarang it takes 21 km to reach the estate. In addition, the government plans to construct supporting facilities such as ports and toll roads. These additional facilities will make this industrial estate the main pillar of the economic community in Central Java.
