= Kota Jababeka =

Industrial estate and township in Cikarang, West Java, Indonesia

Coordinates: 6.290003°S 107.169956°E

Kota Jababeka is an integrated industry-based township development in the town of Cikarang, Bekasi Regency, Indonesia, which is within Greater Jakarta. Owned by Kawasan Industri Jababeka (which was originally established to develop the township), it is located 35 km east of Jakarta city center with a land area of about 5,600 hectares.

The township has separate zones for industrial, residential and commercial purpose. The township has a public transportation network, shopping, leisure and entertainment establishments, as well as a dry port, power plants, water treatment plants, waste water treatment plants and other civic amenities. The township can be reached by Jakarta–Cikampek Toll Road.

== Facilities ==
=== Industrial area ===
Jababeka Industrial Estate is the first modern Indonesian eco-industrial estate and jointly developed with ProLH GTZ under a technical cooperation program collaboratively established by Indonesia's Ministry of Environment and the Republic of Germany. The industrial estate includes industrial land lot, built-to suit factories, Biz Park Jababeka and logistic buildings. It spans in more than 2,000 hectares of land and contains more than 1,650 local and multinational corporations from 30 countries, such as United States, Japan, France, United Kingdom, the Netherlands, Australia, Korea, Singapore, Taiwan, and Malaysia. This industrial area has now filled about 1,700 tenant national and multinational companies from 30 countries and employs over 700,000 workers and 4,300 expatriates.

=== Residential estate ===
The residential zone of Kota Jababeka known as Jababaka Residence, development of which was started in 1992. The residential area is divided into various type of clusters. It has a land area of about 1400 hectares.

=== Commercial area ===
The commercial district is situated at the center of Kota Jababeka and contains a wide variety of commercial facilities like shop-houses, office and commercial space.

=== Dry port ===
Cikarang Dry Port (CDP) is a dry port located within Kota Jababaka. CDP was established in 2010 with a total area of 200 hectares. It is the first Integrated Customs Services Zone in Indonesia.

== Transportation ==
Kota Jababeka is accessible via the Jakarta–Cikampek Toll Road and takes about 1 – 1.5 hours journey from Jakarta. The Transjakarta bus rapid transit (BRT) network provides a feeder route from Jababeka to Grand Wisata Bekasi and Cawang Sentral BRT station in East Jakarta, labelled as route B51.

== See also ==
- Cikarang
- Jababeka Group
