= Cikarang =

- Town

Other transcription(s)
  - Sundanese: ᮎᮤᮊᮛᮀ
  - Betawi: چيكارڠ
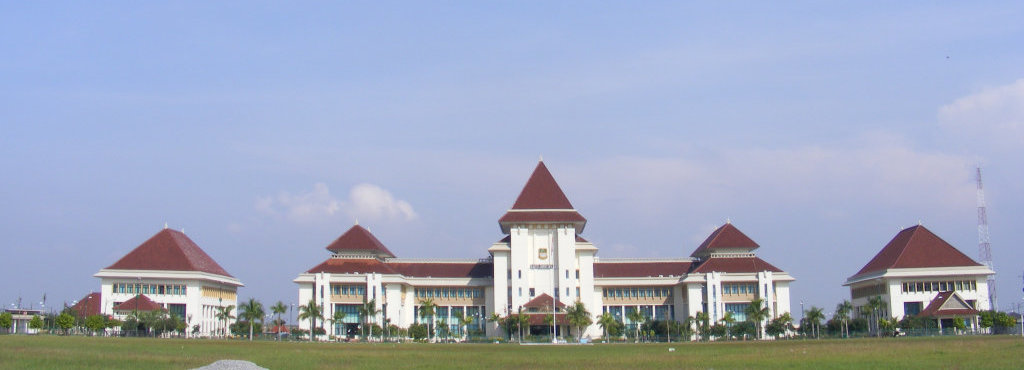
- Bekasi Regency administration building
- Interactive map of Cikarang
- Coordinates: 6.364°S 107.178°E
- Country: Indonesia
- Province: West Java
- Regency: Bekasi Regency

Area
  - Total: 223.14 km^{2} (86.15 sq mi)
- Elevation: 14–85 m (46–279 ft)

Population (mid 2024)
  - Total: 837,469
  - Density: 3,753.1/km^{2} (9,720.5/sq mi)
- Time zone: UTC+7 (Indonesia Western Time)
- Area code: (+62) 21
- License plate: B
- Website: www.bekasikab.go.id

Cikarang (Sundanese: ᮎᮤᮊᮛᮀ; Betawi: چيكارڠ) is a large industrial, commercial and residential town (larger in both area and population than most independent cities of Indonesia) which includes the administrative headquarters of Bekasi Regency, West Java Province of Indonesia. The biggest industrial estate in Southeast Asia, Kota Jababeka is located there.

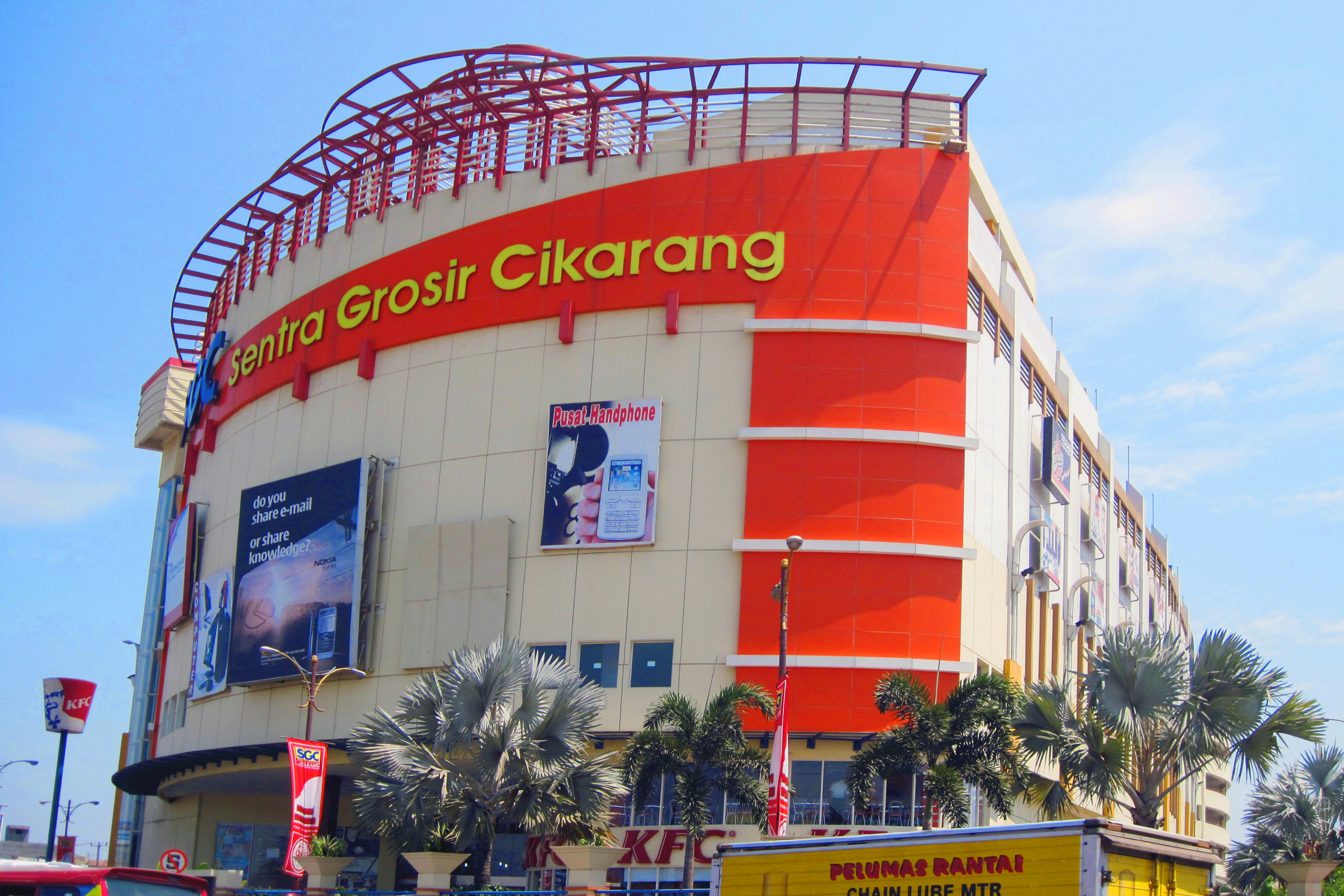
Sentra Grosir Cikarang Shopping Mall

== Industrial area ==
Cikarang includes Kota Deltamas as well as the administrative government of Bekasi Regency. Cikarang has contributed to the spread of industrialization from the West Cikarang (Cibitung) area to South Cikarang. The city is known for MM2100 Cikarang Barat, Kota Jababeka, Bekasi International Industrial Estate (BIIE), or the Hyundai Industrial Park; East Jakarta Industrial Park (EJIP), Delta Silicon Industrial Park, and Indonesia-China Integrated Industrial Zone (Kawasan Industri Terpadu Indonesia-China, KITIC). Many foreign companies are located in Cikarang industrial estate.

Cikarang's Industrial City is supported by housing complexes scattered around the Cikarang industrial park that was built by a collection of architects and contractors under PT PP. This residential area stretches around Tambun, Cibitung, Cikarang, Serang, Setu, Cicau, and Cibarusah. Some residential areas are well known, such as Jababeka and Lippo Cikarang. Cikarang has attracted industries including tourism, household, food and television.

Cikarang Dry Port is located in Jababeka Industrial Estate, the biggest manufacturing zone of West Java. Indonesia is home to a dozen industrial estates with more than 2,500 companies, both multinational and small-medium enterprises (SMEs). Approximately 200 hectares (490 acres) are allocated for the Dry Port, which is accessible by highway and rail.

Cikarang wet Port offers cargo handling and logistics for export and import, as well as domestic distribution. It provides integrated port and logistics services with dozens of logistics and supply chain players, such as export/import, carriers, terminal operators, container freight stations, bonded warehouses, transportation, third party logistics (3PL), and empty container depots, as well as banks and other supporting facilities. The Dry Port is the extension gate of Tanjung Priok International Port. Document formalities for port clearance and customs clearance are completed in the Cikarang Dry Port.

Cikarang Dry Port has been appointed as an Integrated Customs Services Zone with a new international port code, IDJBK. The shipping lines’ service connects Cikarang Dry Port with other ports as part of international trading lines.

== Demographics ==
There is no single administrative body at the level of the extensive town of Cikarang; instead, the town covers five of the administrative districts (kelurahan) of Bekasi Regency. In total, Cikarang covers a land area of 223.14 km^{2} and had a combined population of 733,253 at the 2010 Census and 769,618 at the 2020 Census; the official estimate of the five districts as at mid 2024 was 837,469 - comprising 423,157 males and 414,312 females.

- Cikarang Pusat (Central Cikarang) had a population of 56,756 at the 2010 Census and 67,336 at the 2020 Census; the official estimate as at mid 2024 was 71,493 - comprising 35,719 males and 35,774 females. The district centre is at Sukamahi, and the six desa share a postcode of 17531.
- Cikarang Selatan (South Cikarang) had a population of 143,030 at the 2010 Census and 161,534 at the 2020 Census; the official estimate as at mid 2024 was 182,072 - comprising 91,604 males and 90,468 females. The district centre is at Sukadami, and the seven desa share a postcode of 17532.
- Cikarang Timur (East Cikarang) had a population of 91,326 at the 2010 Census and 106,478 at the 2020 Census; the official estimate as at mid 2024 was 114,825 - comprising 58,040 males and 56,585 females. The district centre is at Jatibaru, and the kelurahan of Sertajaya and the seven desa share a postcode of 17533.
- Cikarang Utara (North Cikarang) had a population of 230,563 at the 2010 Census and 228,937 at the 2020 Census; the official estimate as at mid 2024 was 249,228 - comprising 126,282 males and 122,946 females. The district centre is at Cikarangkota, and the eleven desa share a postcode of 17534.
- Cikarang Barat (West Cikarang) had a population of 211,578 at the 2010 Census and 205,333 at the 2020 Census; the official estimate as at mid 2024 was 220,051 - comprising 111,512 males and 108,539 females. The district centre is at Telaga Asih, and that kelurahan and the ten desa share a postcode of 17530.

The five districts are sub-divided administratively into 2 kelurahan (the towns of Sertajaya and Telaga Asih) and 41 desa (nominally "rural" villages), listed below with their areas and their officially-estimated populations as at mid 2022.

Kode Wilayah	Name of Kelurahan or Desa	Area in km^{2}	Population mid 2024 estimate
32.16.20.2001	Cicau	9.0	8,314
32.16.20.2002	Sukamahi	9.0	9,900
32.16.20.2003	Pasirranji	9.0	4,681
32.16.20.2004	Hegarmukti	7.0	16,858
32.16.20.2005	Jayamukti	5.0	22,540
32.16.20.2006	Pasirtanjung	5.0	9,200
32.16.20	Central Cikarang	44.00	71,493
32.16.19.2001	Cibatu	12.00	17,476
32.16.19.2002	Sukasejati	4.60	9,770
32.16.19.2003	Ciantra	5.27	43,167
32.16.19.2004	Sukadami	6.25	52,202
32.16.19.2005	Sukaresmi	11.02	13,137
32.16.19.2006	Serang	4.96	21,923
32.16.19.2007	Pasirsari	5.47	24,397
32.16.19	South Cikarang	49.57	182,072
32.16.11.2001	Tanjungbaru	7.36	17,943
32.16.11.2002	Cipayung	6.80	14,992
32.16.11.2003	Hegarmanah	6.13	8,738
32.16.11.2004	Jatireja	5.59	26,602
32.16.11.2005	Jatibaru	4.18	9,590
32.16.11.2006	Labansari	4.01	7,157
32.16.11.1007	Sertajaya (town)	5.18	16,787
32.16.11.2008	Karangsari	0.85	12,816
32.16.11	East Cikarang	40.10	114,625

Kode Wilayah	Name of Kelurahan or Desa	Area in km^{2}	Population mid 2024 estimate
32.16.09.2001	Cikarangkota	1.48	24,159
32.16.09.2002	Karangbaru	1.40	9,090
32.16.09.2003	Karangasih	2.70	43,911
32.16.09.2004	Waluya	3.10	25,220
32.16.09.2005	Karangraharja	3.90	43,300
32.16.09.2006	Pasirgombong	4.90	22,060
32.16.09.2007	Simpangan	3.10	26,779
32.16.09.2008	Tanjungsari	2.90	11,285
32.16.09.2009	Harjamekar	4.30	10,202
32.16.09.2010	Mekarmukti	4.21	24,680
32.16.09.2011	Wangunharja	4.44	8,542
32.16.09	North Cikarang	36.43	249,228
32.16.08.2001	Telaga Mumi	4.38	56,422
32.16.08.2002	Mekarwangi	6.02	13,811
32.16.08.2003	Jatiwangi	5.78	7,877
32.16.08.2004	Danauindah	3.28	4,731
32.16.08.2005	Gandamekar	6.08	4,800
32.16.08.2006	Gandasari	3.20	9,277
32.16.08.2007	Sukadanau	6.28	28,409
32.16.08.1008	Telaga Asih	3.52	25,281
32.16.08.2009	Kalijaya	3.88	29,475
32.16.08.2010	Telajung	5.57	30,035
32.16.08.2011	Cikedokan	5.05	9,933
32.16.08	West Cikarang	53.04	220,051

=== Language ===
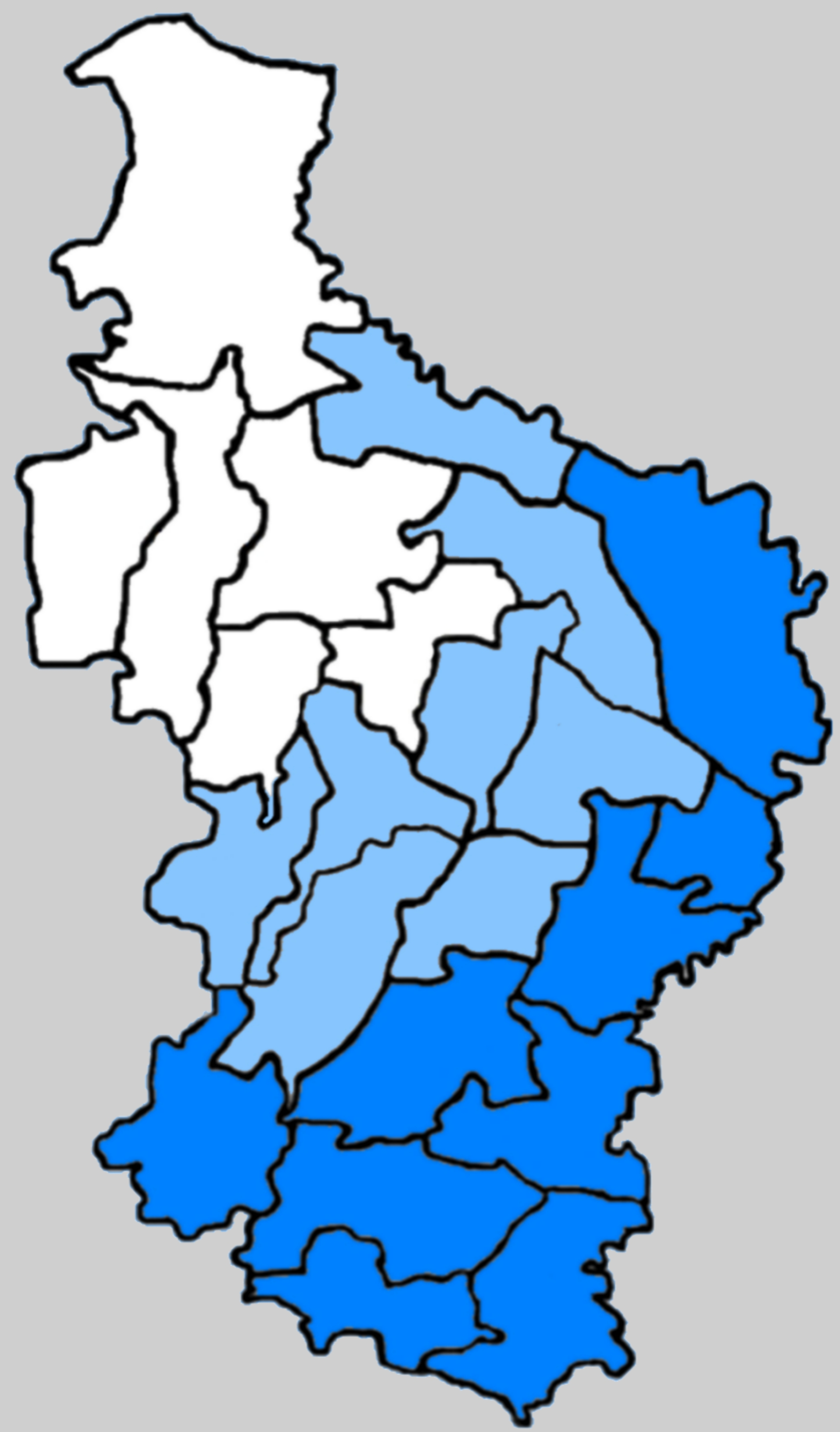
Map of the spread of Sundanese language in Bekasi Regency (covering the Cikarang area). Sundanese as the majority Sundanese as the minority

The language most commonly used by Cikarang residents is Indonesian, this is because Cikarang as an industrial area has diversity in terms of ethnicity and language. However, There are two regional languages used by the natives in Cikarang, namely Sundanese (Bekasi dialect) and Betawi (Cikarang dialect).

The Sundanese language is mostly spoken in Central Cikarang (Cikarang Pusat), South Cikarang (Cikarang Selatan) and East Cikarang (Cikarang Timur). Meanwhile, the Betawi language is spoken in North Cikarang (Cikarang Utara) and West Cikarang (Cikarang Barat). The boundaries of the use of these two languages in Cikarang overlap, but are mainly delimited by National Route 1 (known as Jalan Pantai Utara). The distribution is that the Sundanese language is spoken in the south while the Betawi language is spoken in the north.

== Climate ==
Cikarang has a tropical monsoon climate (Am) with moderate rainfall from May to October and heavy rainfall from November to April.

Climate data for Cikarang
Month	Jan	Feb	Mar	Apr	May	Jun	Jul	Aug	Sep	Oct	Nov	Dec	Year
Mean daily maximum °C (°F)	29.0 (84.2)	30.1 (86.2)	30.9 (87.6)	31.6 (88.9)	31.9 (89.4)	32.1 (89.8)	32.1 (89.8)	32.5 (90.5)	32.9 (91.2)	32.9 (91.2)	32.1 (89.8)	31.0 (87.8)	31.6 (88.9)
Daily mean °C (°F)	26.2 (79.2)	26.4 (79.5)	26.8 (80.2)	27.2 (81.0)	27.3 (81.1)	27.1 (80.8)	26.9 (80.4)	27.0 (80.6)	27.4 (81.3)	27.6 (81.7)	27.4 (81.3)	26.8 (80.2)	27.0 (80.6)
Mean daily minimum °C (°F)	22.6 (72.7)	22.7 (72.9)	22.7 (72.9)	22.9 (73.2)	22.8 (73.0)	22.1 (71.8)	21.7 (71.1)	21.6 (70.9)	22.0 (71.6)	22.4 (72.3)	22.7 (72.9)	22.7 (72.9)	22.4 (72.4)
Average rainfall mm (inches)	320 (12.6)	270 (10.6)	217 (8.5)	154 (6.1)	129 (5.1)	99 (3.9)	69 (2.7)	47 (1.9)	64 (2.5)	125 (4.9)	183 (7.2)	218 (8.6)	1,895 (74.6)
Source: Climate-Data.org

== Transport ==
Cikarang railway station is served by KRL Commuter Line to Jakarta Kota railway station and regional train services such as Jatiluhur (runs between Cikarang and Cikampek) and Walahar Express (Cikarang to Purwakarta). Lemahabang railway station, also located in Cikarang, is only served by Jatiluhur and Walahar Express trains.

== Sports ==
Wibawa Mukti Stadium was used as a venue for men's football at the 2018 Asian Games.

== See also ==
- Lippo Cikarang, an independent township developed by Lippo Group
- Central Cikarang, a district which is part of Cikarang
- Bekasi Regency
