= Timeline of Go =

Chronology of the board game Go

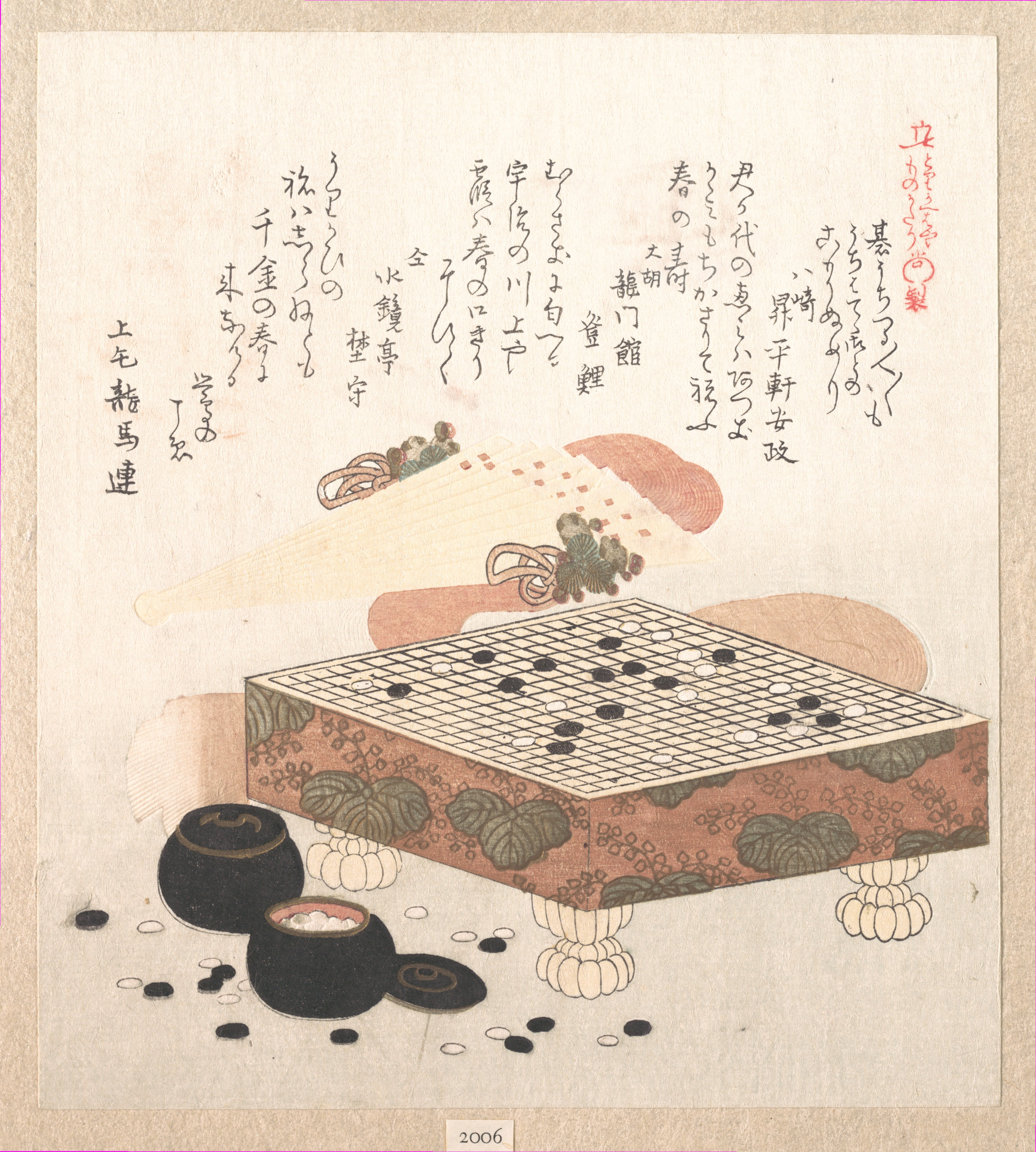
Outfit for the Go Game, woodblock print (surimono), 19th century, Metropolitan Museum of Art.

This is a timeline of the history of the board game Go (囲碁, igo; 围棋, 圍棋, wéiqí; 바둑, baduk), from its legendary origins in ancient China to the age of AI. For the full story, see History of Go.

== Timeline ==
1. === Legends and first records ===
  1. Unknown
    The "Rotten Handle" legend of the origin of the game: a carpenter in Zhejiang watches deities playing a mysterious game and loses track of time.
  2. c. 2356–2255 BCE
    According to legend, Emperor Yao creates the game to teach discipline and balance to his son Danzhu. Another legend has Shun, his successor, invent it for his own son.
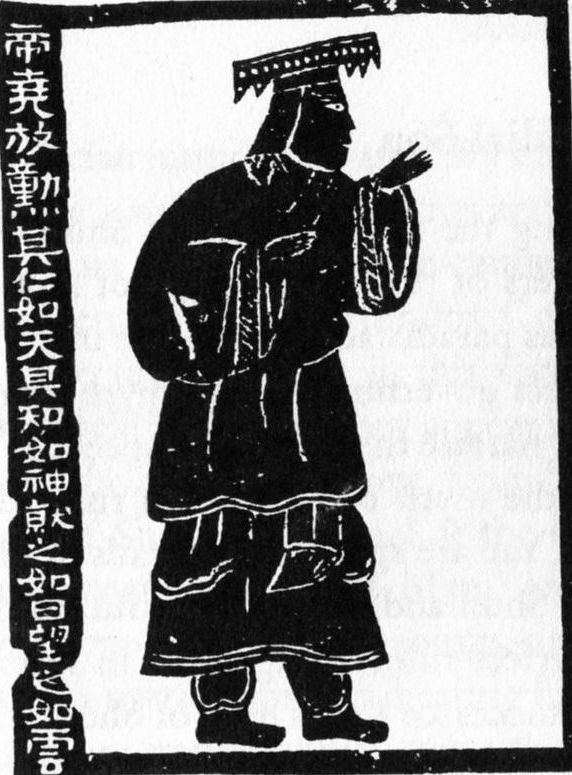
    Emperor Yao
  3. 548 BCE
    The earliest written reference to the game is usually taken to be the historical annal Zuo Zhuan, about an event of this year; it is also mentioned in the Analects of Confucius (c. 551 – c. 479 BCE) and in the books of Mencius (c. 371 – c. 289 BCE).
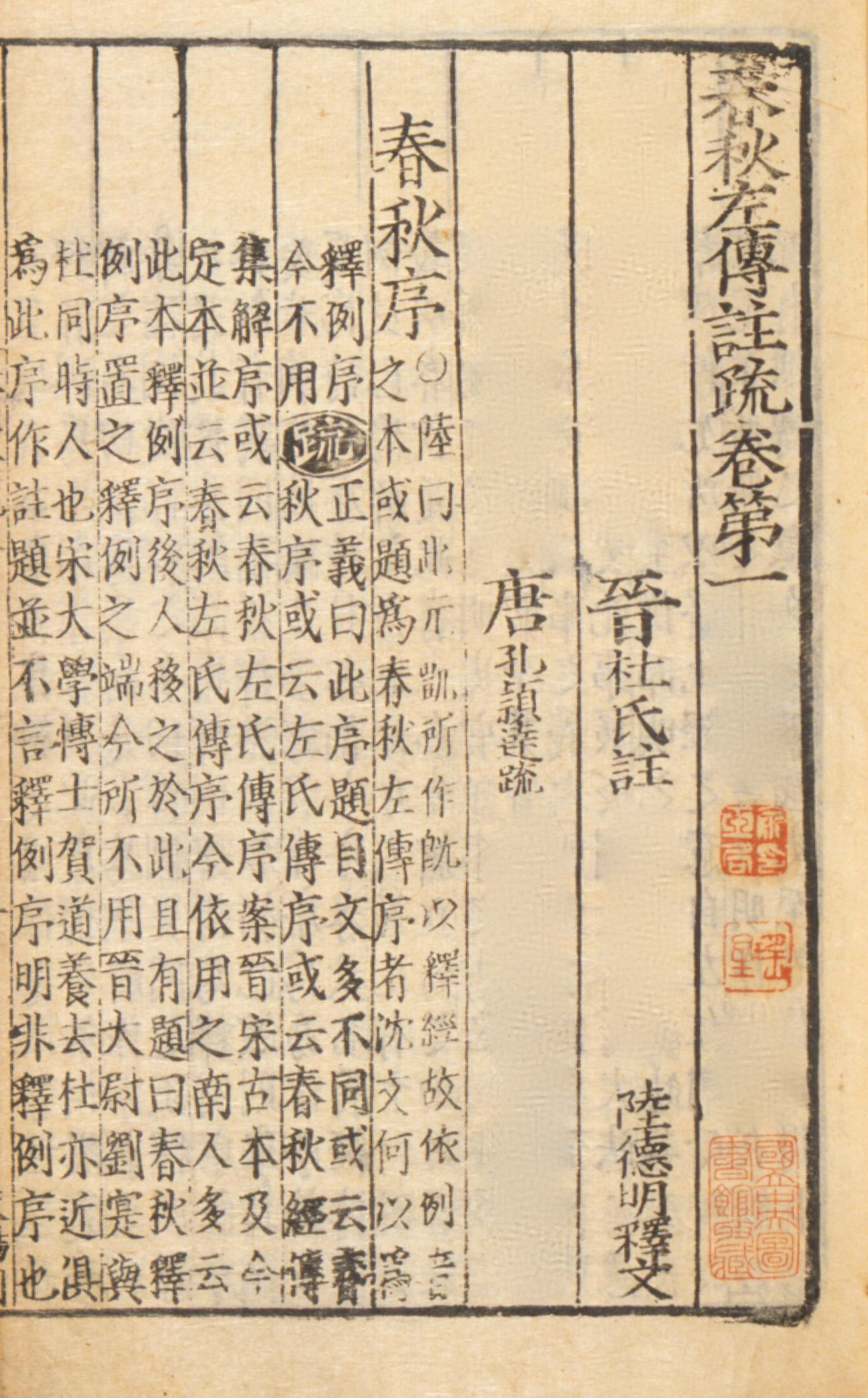
    First page of an edition of the Zuo Zhuan
  4. 3rd century BCE
    Mencius mentions a famous player called Yi Qiu.
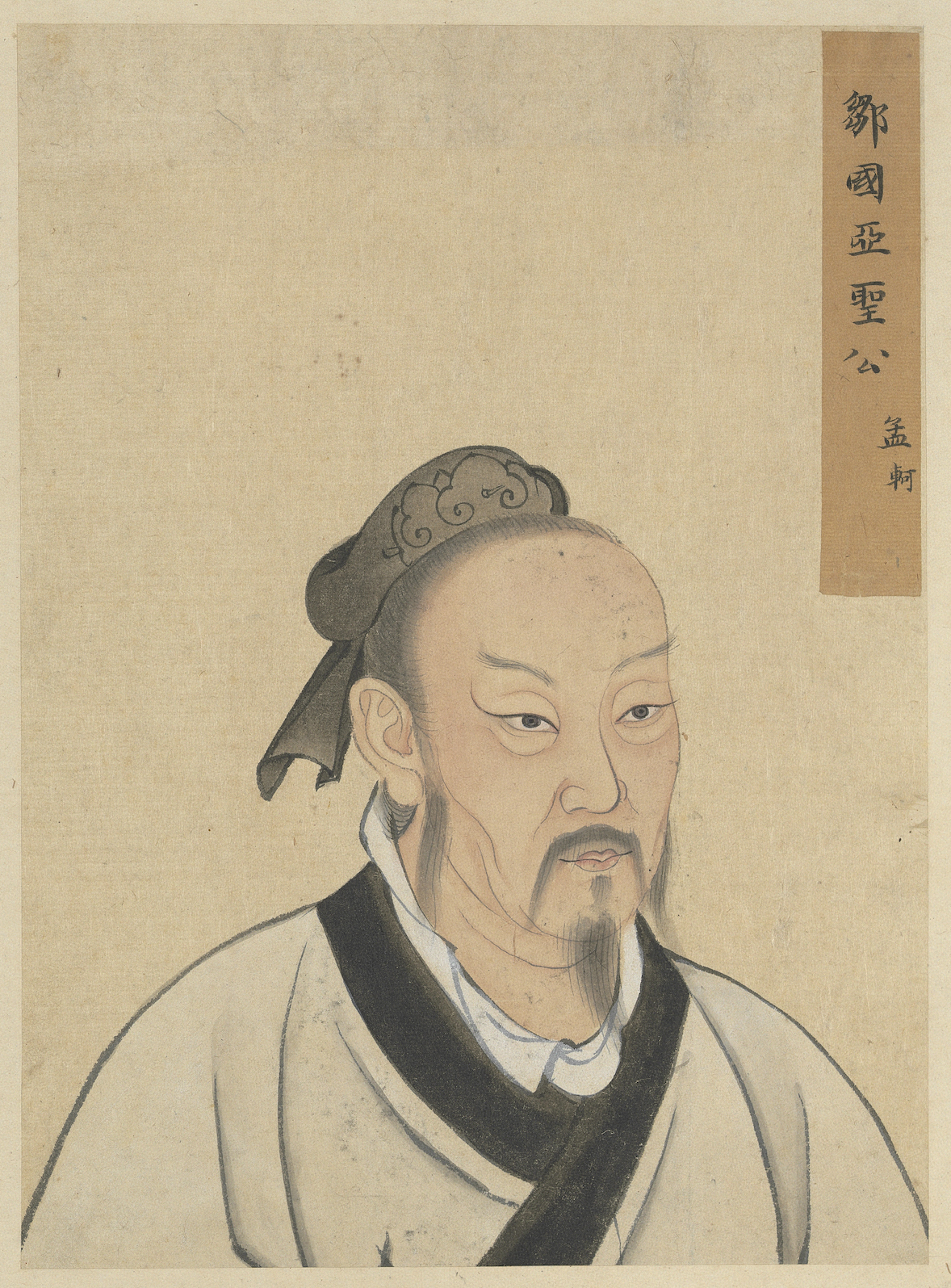
    Mencius
  5. 206 BCE – 24 CE
    Western Han: a broken piece of a pottery board, the earliest board found in China, is later unearthed in Shaanxi.
  6. 1st–3rd century
    Eastern Han: Ban Gu (32–92) writes Yì Zhǐ ("The Essentials of Go"), the oldest surviving text devoted to Go, and boards have 17 × 17 lines.
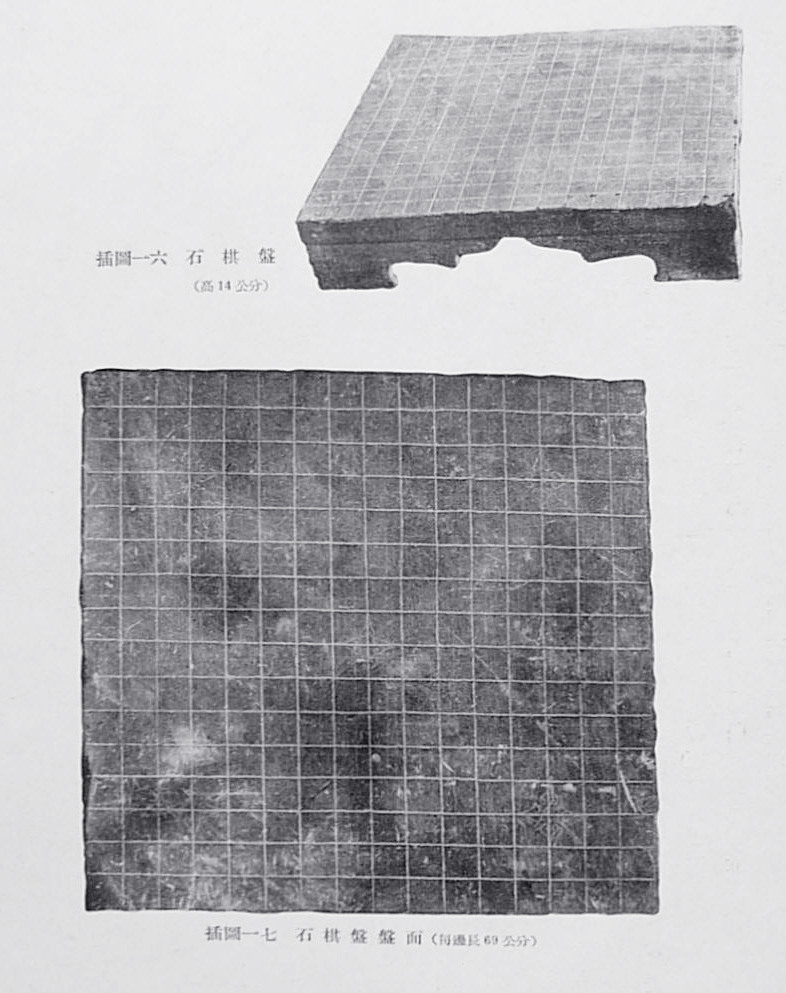
    A Han dynasty Go board
  7. c. 250
    The "Wu Diagrams" record the earliest known game of Go.
2. === Ancient and medieval East Asia ===
  1. 3rd–6th century
    The board grows from 17 × 17 to 19 × 19 lines. The Dunhuang Go Manual, the first book devoted to Go on the larger board, dates to this period.
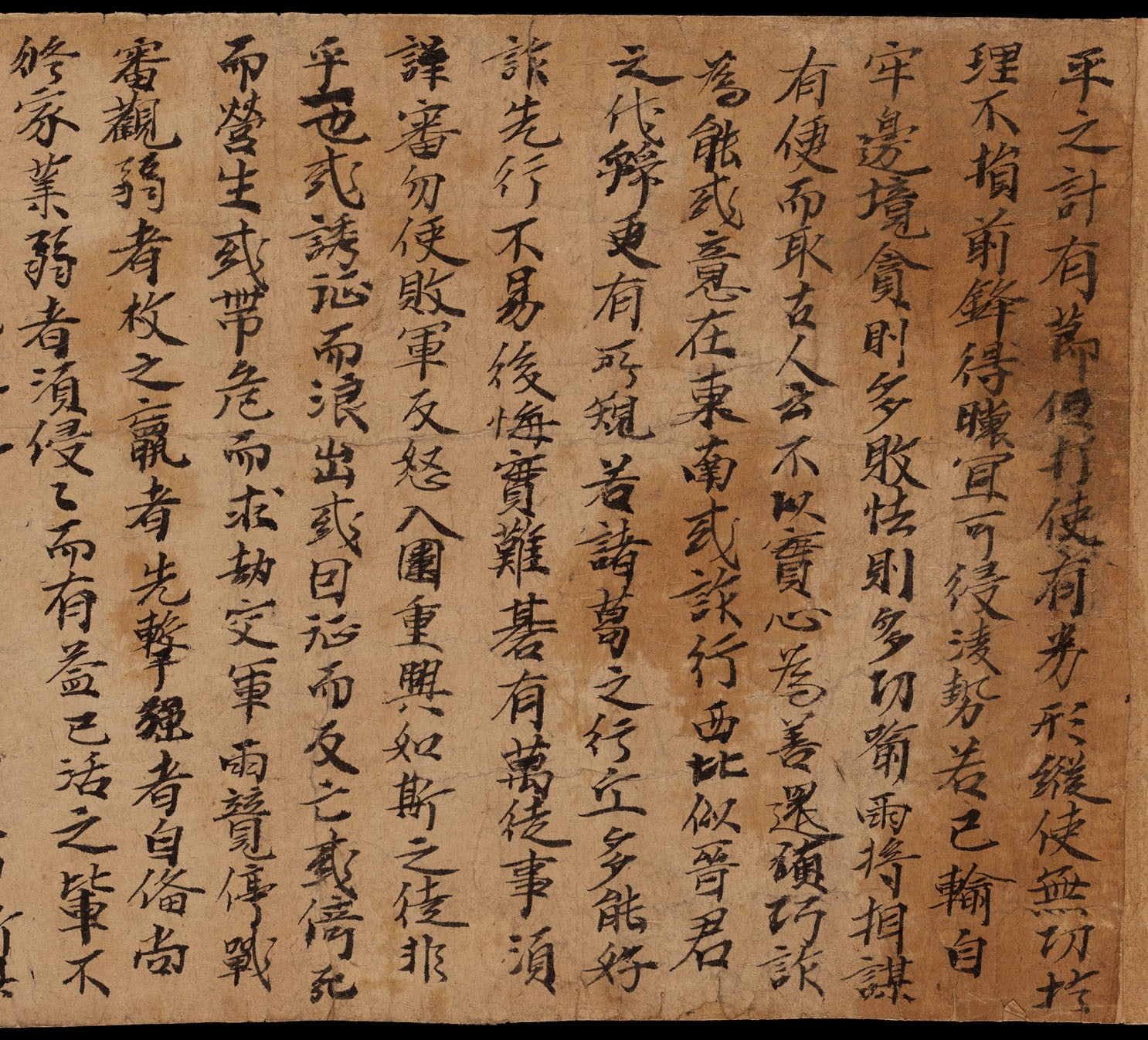
    The Dunhuang Go Manual, British Library
  2. 475
    In the rivalry between Goguryeo (37 BCE – 668) and Baekje (18 BCE – 660), the Goguryeo priest To-lim uses the game of Go to spy on King Yogyong; the invasion of Baekje follows.
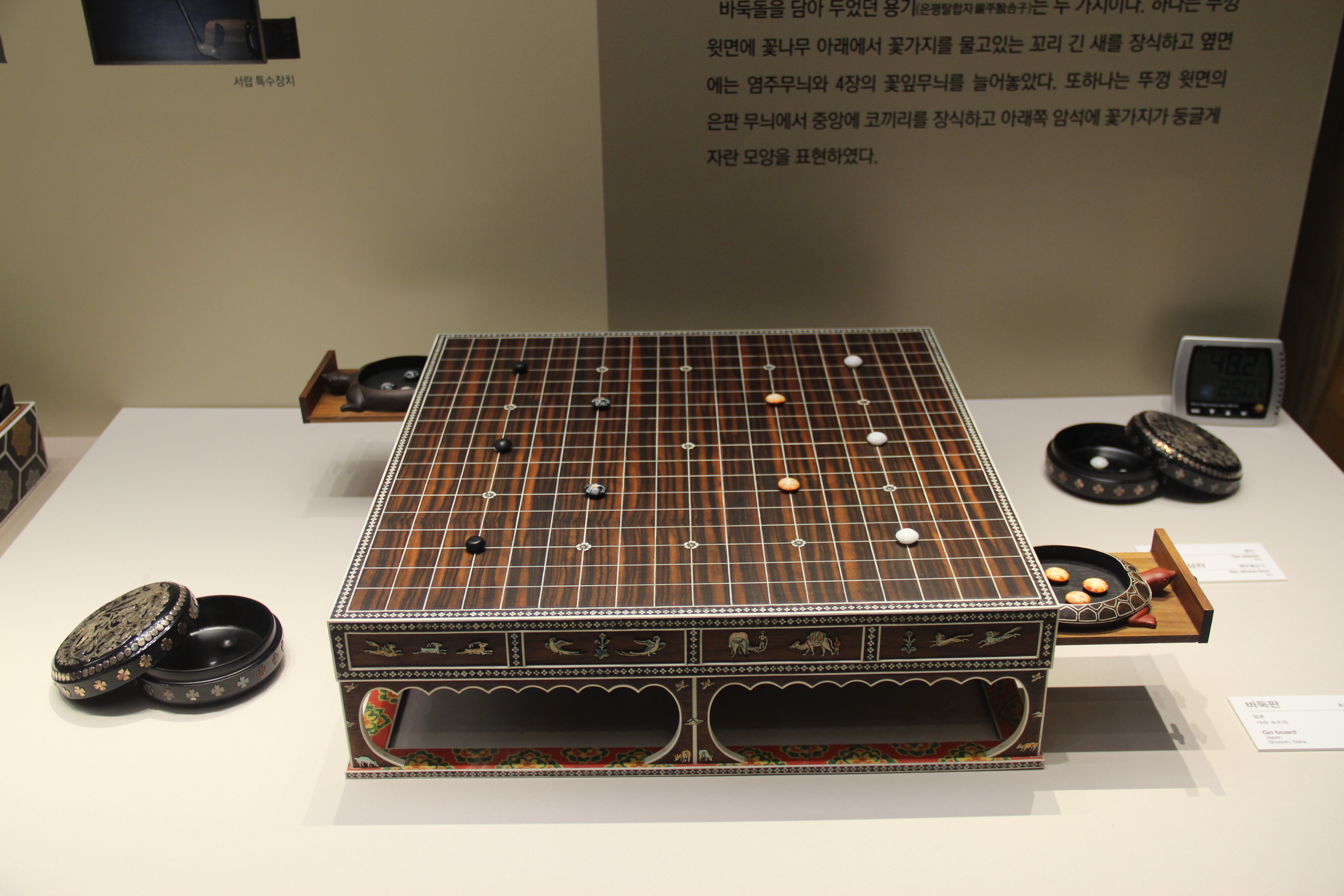
    A copy of a Baekje game of baduk
  3. Around 500
    Emperor Wu of Liang (464–549) promotes the game and holds the first documented national tournament; 278 players receive a rank.
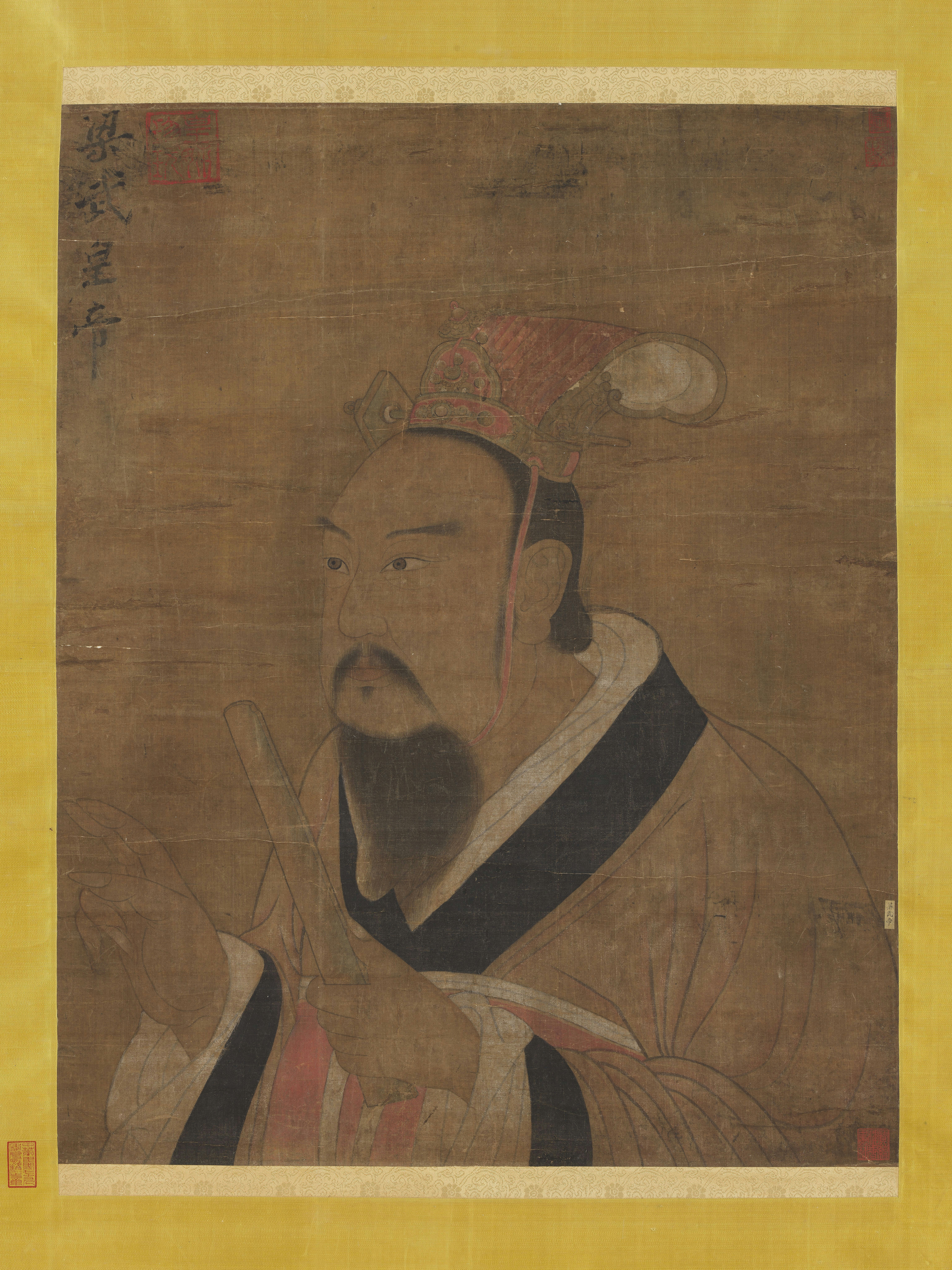
    Emperor Wu of Liang
  4. Early 7th century
    Chinese chronicles (the Records of the Sui) report that the Japanese enjoy Go.
  5. 618–907
    Tang dynasty: the court creates the post of Go attendant ("Qídàizhào") for players who play against the emperor, and players are ranked. Wang Jixin is credited with the "Ten Golden Rules of Go".
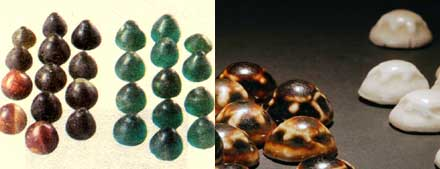
    Early Go stones
  6. Early 8th century
    The game reaches Tibet and Mongolia, where the 17 × 17 board survives.
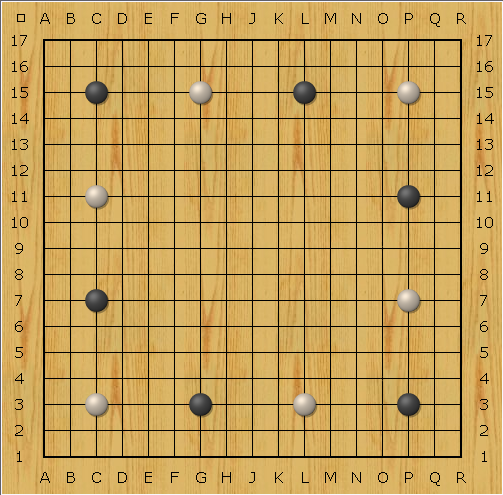
    A Tibetan Go board
  7. 8th century
    Go reaches Japan, traditionally brought back from the Tang court by Kibi no Makibi (695–775); the Taihō Code of 701 already describes it.
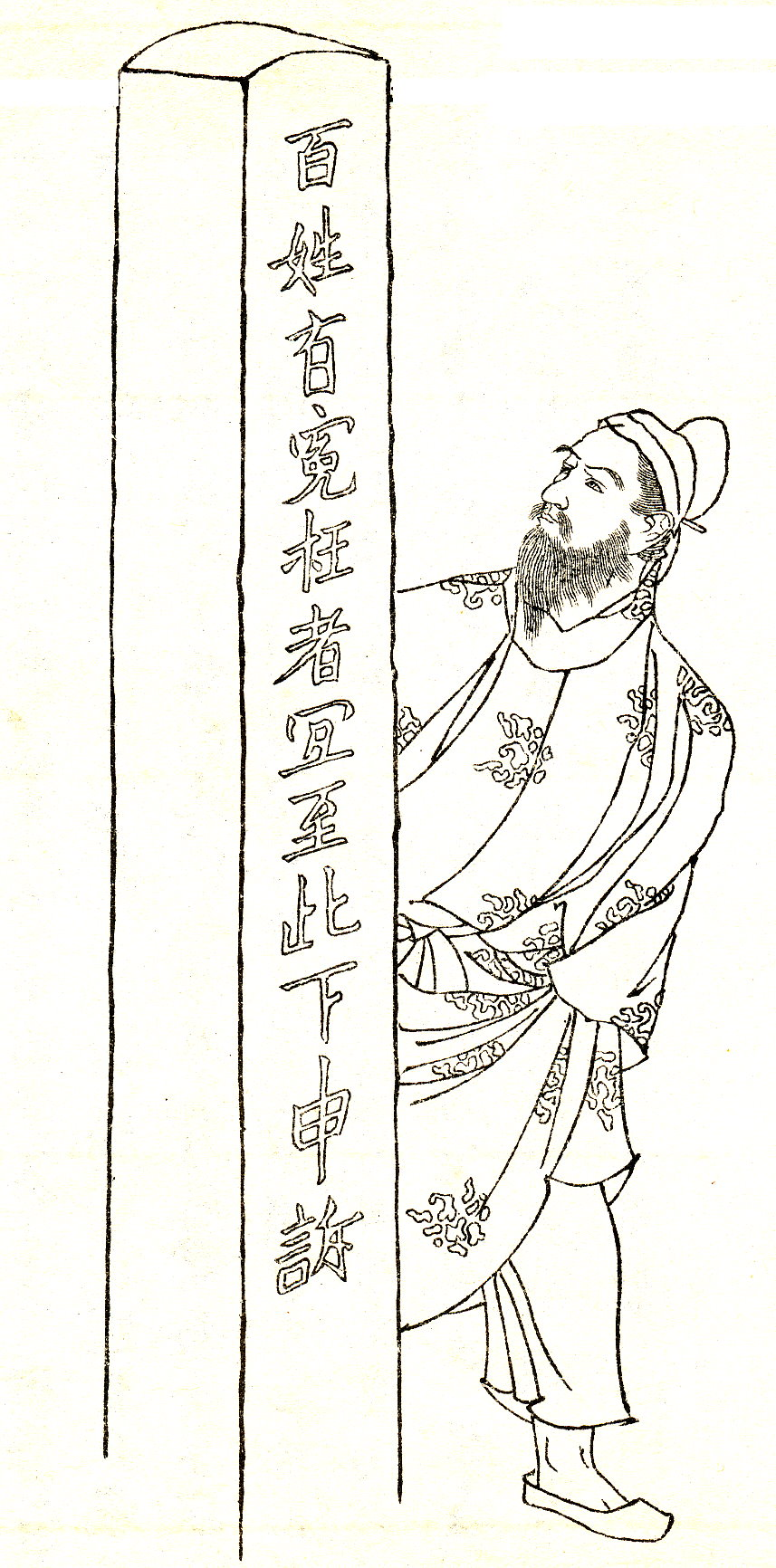
    Kibi no Makibi
  8. 737
    The Chinese player Yang Jiying travels to Korea as an envoy and no player of Silla (57 BCE – 935) can match him.
  9. c. 1050
    Song dynasty (960–1279): a major treatise in thirteen chapters, the Classic of Go (Qíjīng Shísān Piān), is written; the Song era also produces many other treatises on strategy.
  10. c. 1100
    The Wangyou Qingle Ji, compiled by Li Yimin, is the oldest surviving Go book. It collects essays, old game records and the first set of tsumego problems, among them a game between a Japanese prince and Gu Shiyan, the first recorded double-ladder breaker.
  11. 1349
    Yuan dynasty (1271–1368): Yan Defu and Yan Tianzhang compile the Xuanxuan Qijing ("Gateway to All Marvels"), six volumes with 376 problems, essays and game records; it inspires problem books around the world.
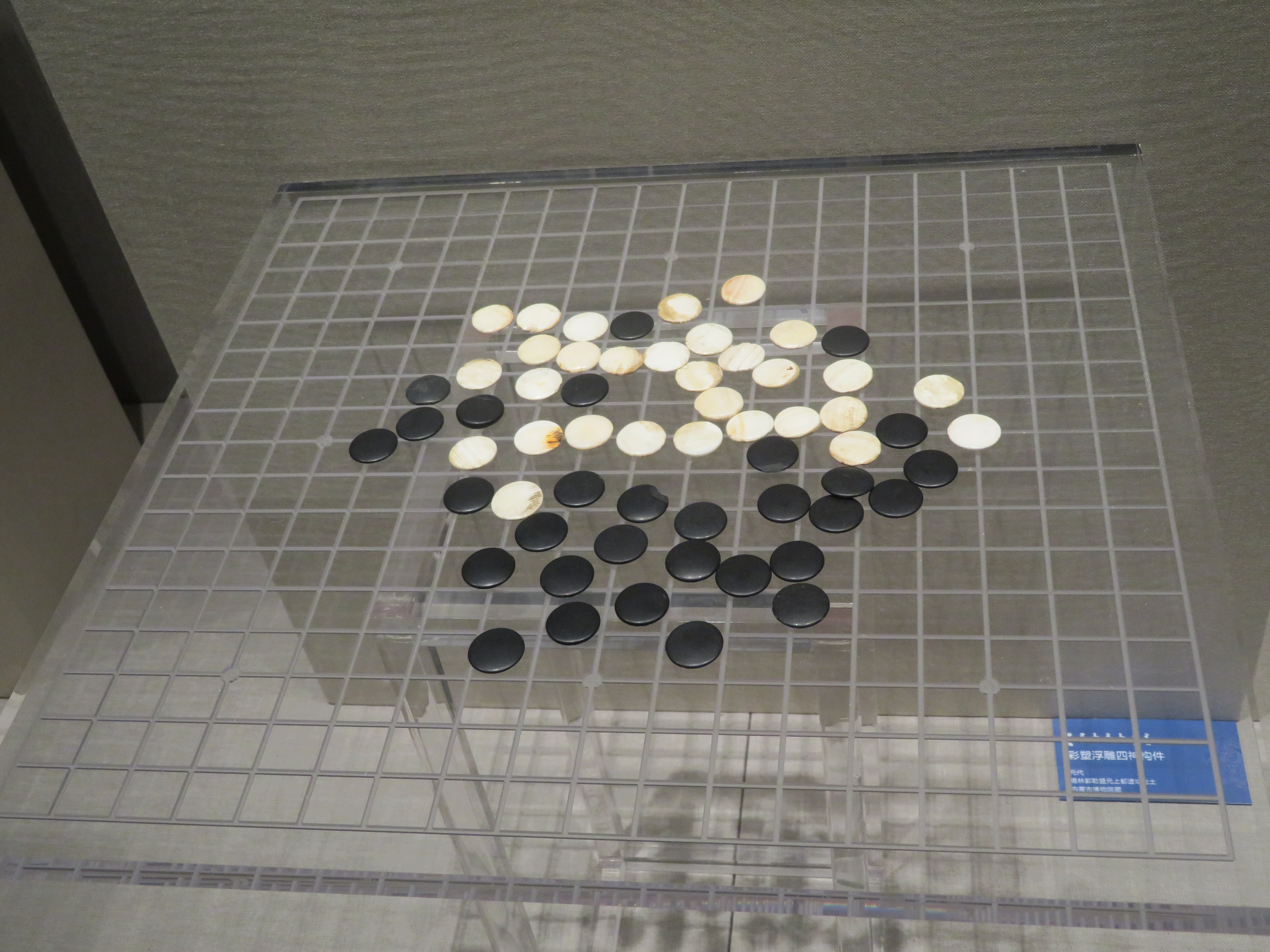
    Weiqi stones, Inner Mongolia Museum
  12. Ming dynasty
    Chinese scoring changes from territory to stone scoring. The Hongwu Emperor (1328–1398) issues an "Edict Banning Weiqi" in the face of widespread gambling on the game.
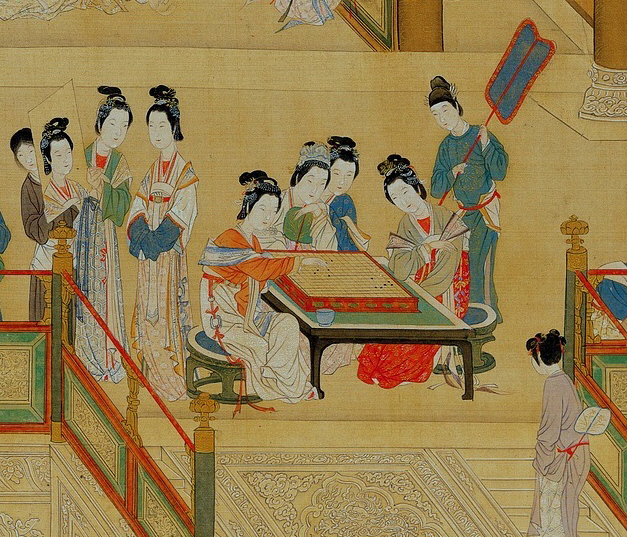
    Go at the Ming court
  13. 1582
    Honinbo Sansa (1559–1623) plays a triple ko against Kashio Rigen (1565–?) at a monastery in Kyoto in the presence of Oda Nobunaga (1534–1582); the game is suspended. The next day Nobunaga is killed, and a triple ko is considered bad luck ever after.
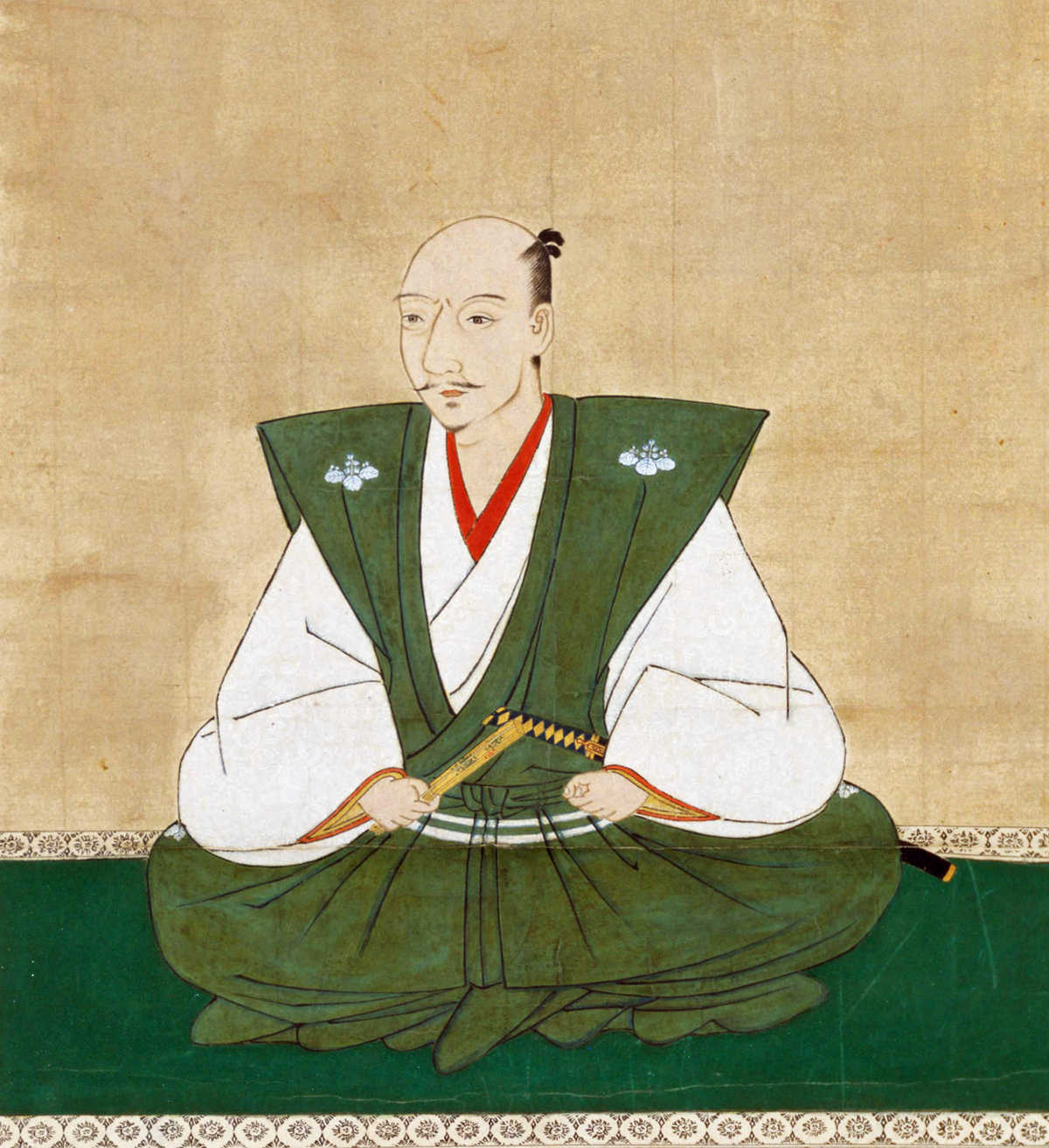
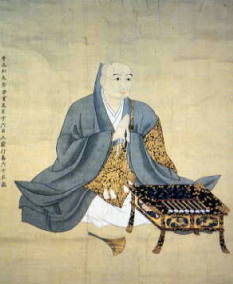
    Oda Nobunaga Hon'inbō Sansa
  14. 1588
    Toyotomi Hideyoshi (1537–1598) organizes the first Japanese Go tournament; Hon'inbō (Sansa) wins and is granted a salary.
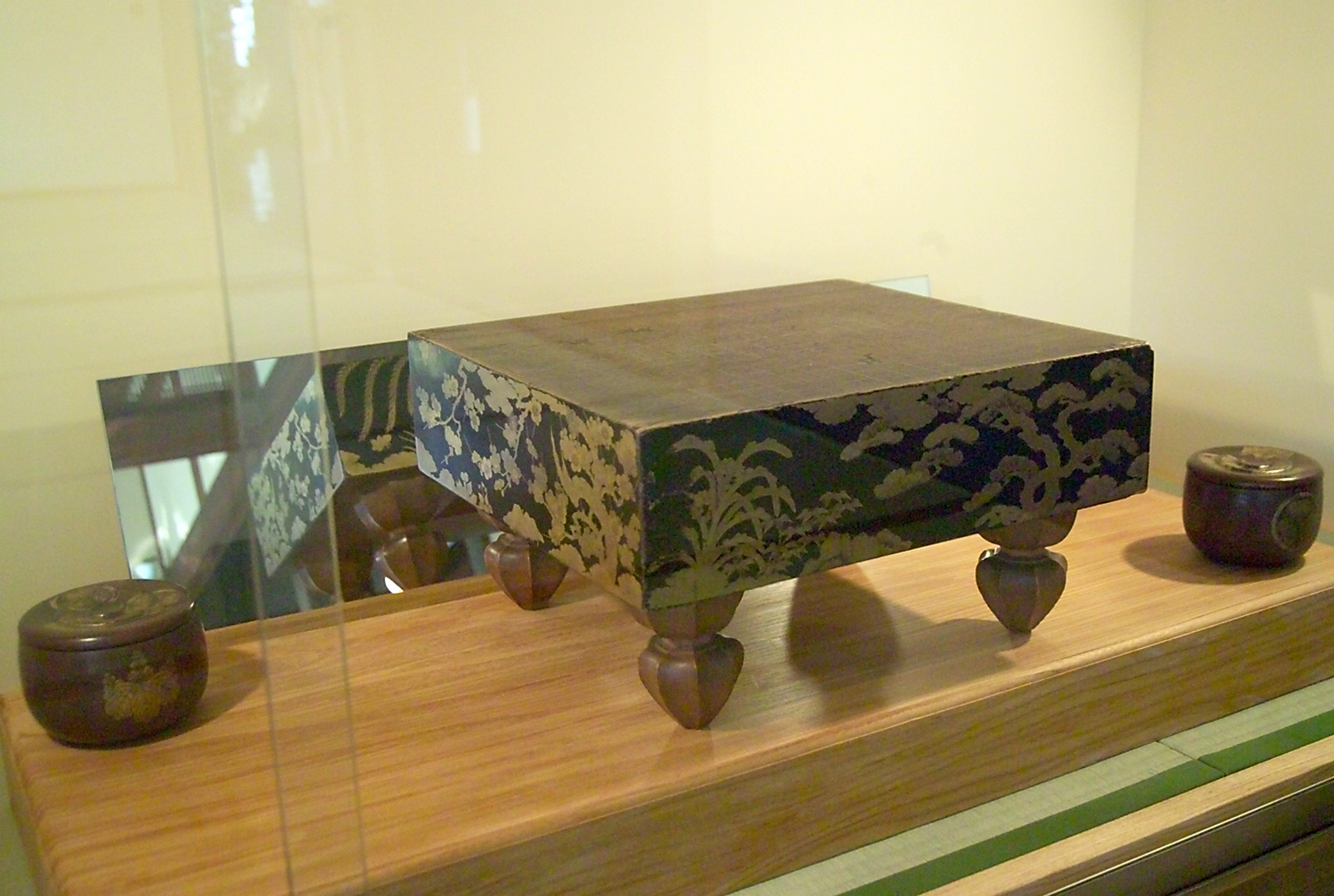
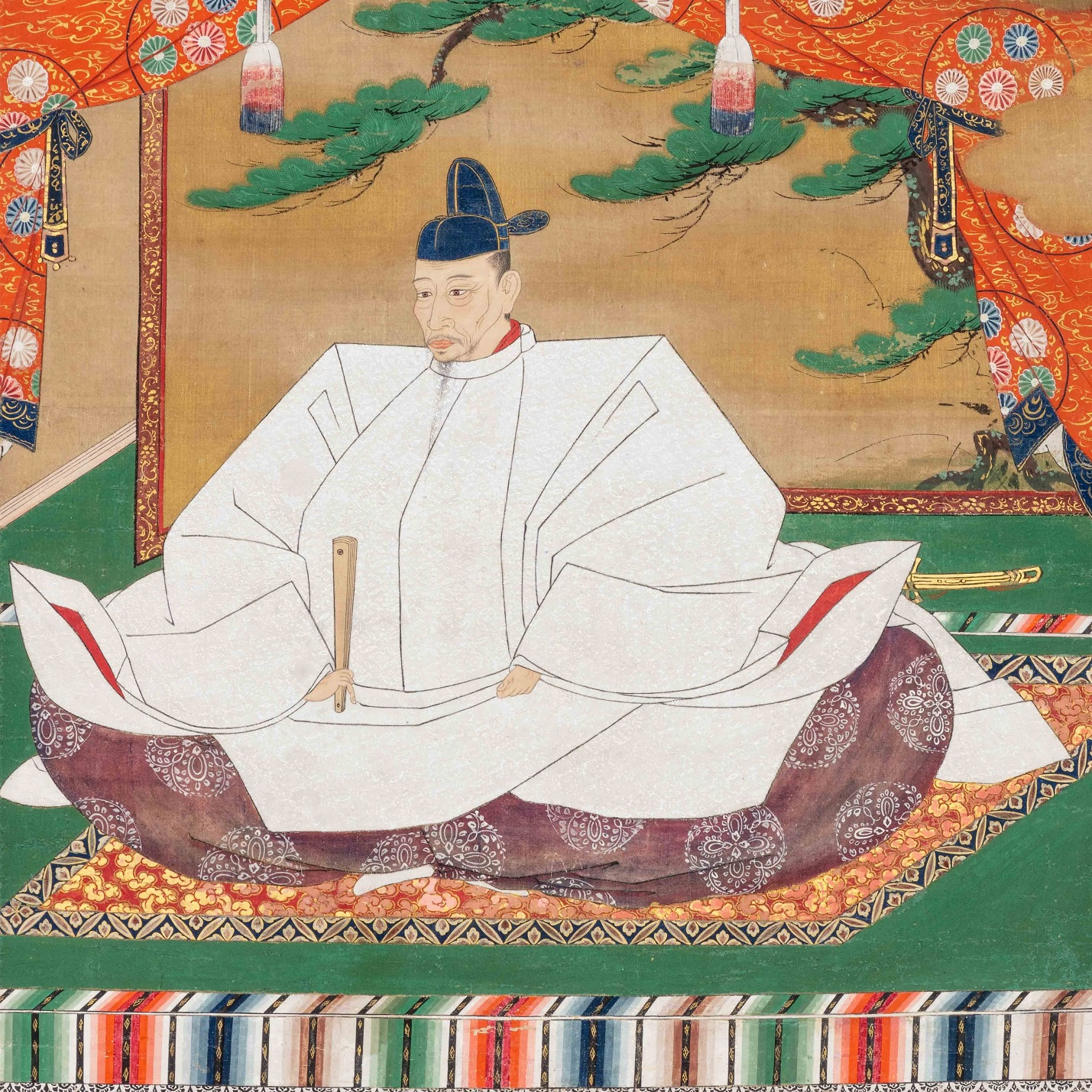
    The Go board of Hideyoshi and Ieyasu, Ryōgen-in Toyotomi Hideyoshi
3. === Edo-period Japan and Qing China ===
  1. 1603
    Honinbo Sansa (1559–1623) is appointed by Shogun Tokugawa Ieyasu (1543–1616) as head of the Go world (Meijin Godokoro): the major Japanese Go school system begins.
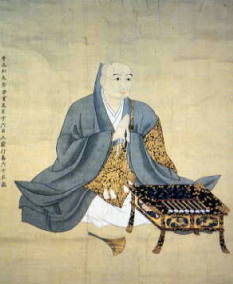
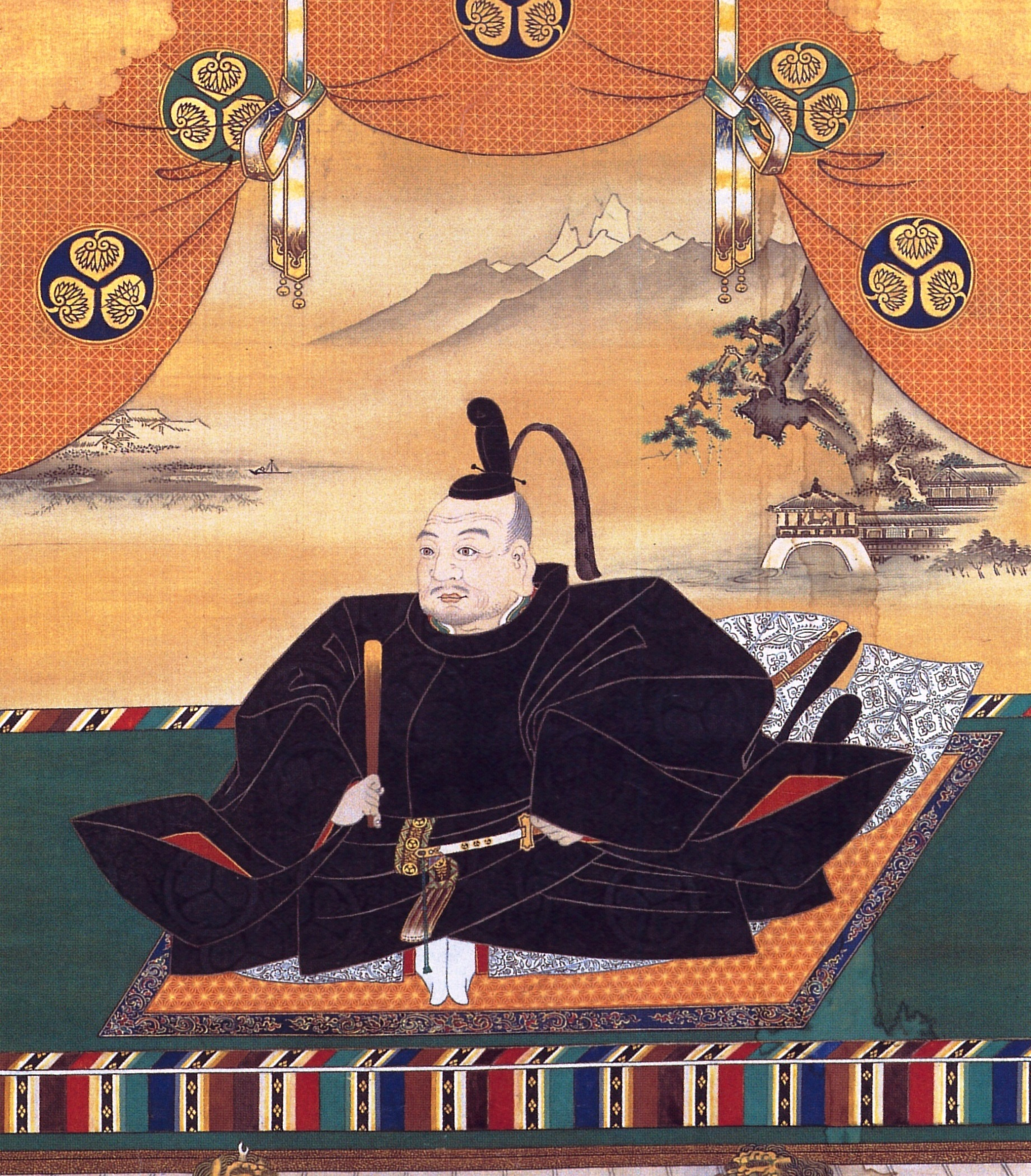
    Hon'inbō Sansa Tokugawa Ieyasu
  2. 1612
    The Tokugawa shogunate (1603–1868) establishes four hereditary Go houses (Hon'inbō, Inoue, Yasui and Hayashi) and pays them stipends; they compete for 250–300 years.
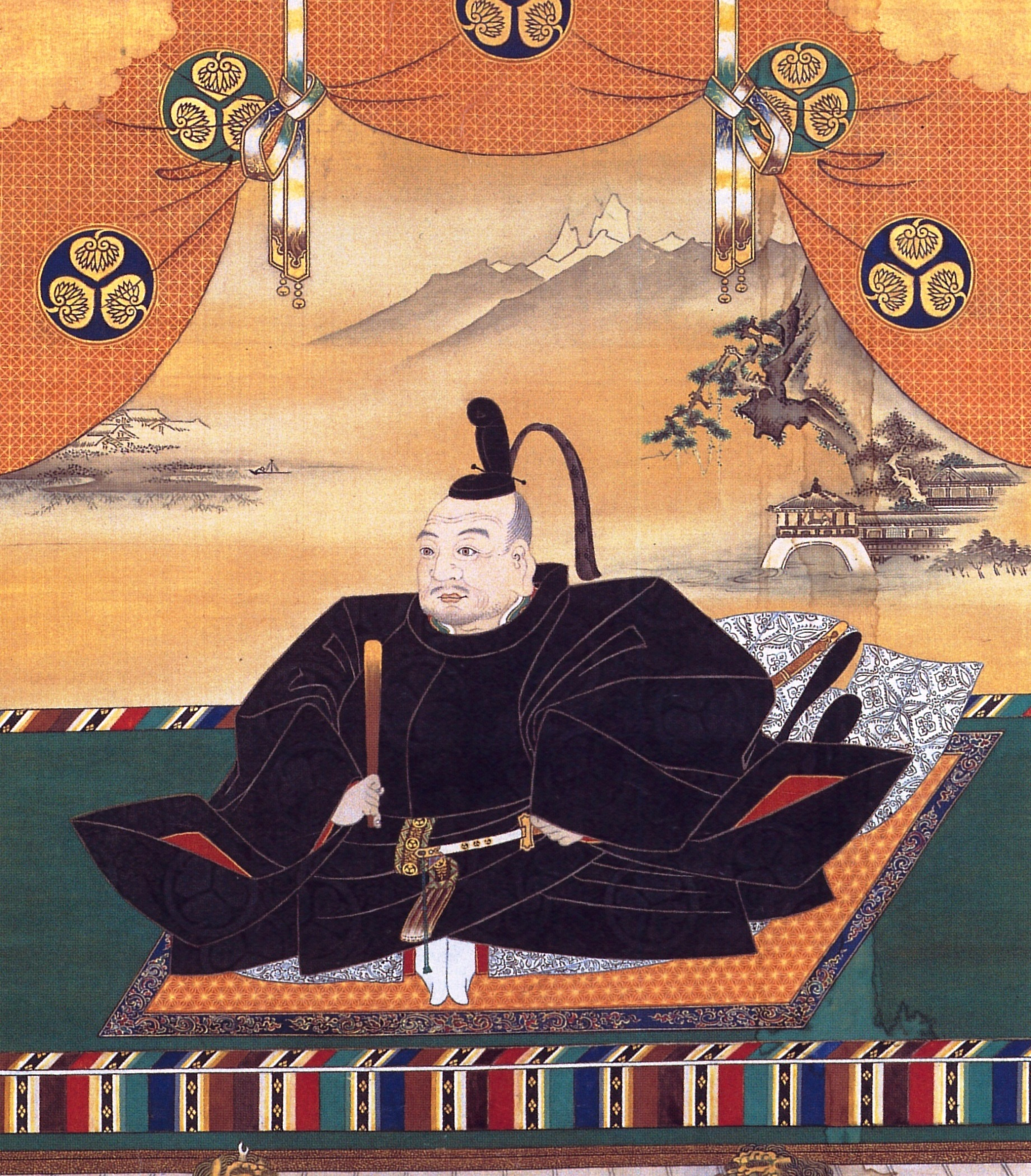
    Tokugawa Ieyasu, founder of the Tokugawa shogunate
  3. 1615
    Nicolas Trigault (1577–1628) publishes in Augsburg the diaries of the Jesuit Matteo Ricci (1552–1610), which explain the game of weiqi; the book goes through at least 16 editions in European languages.
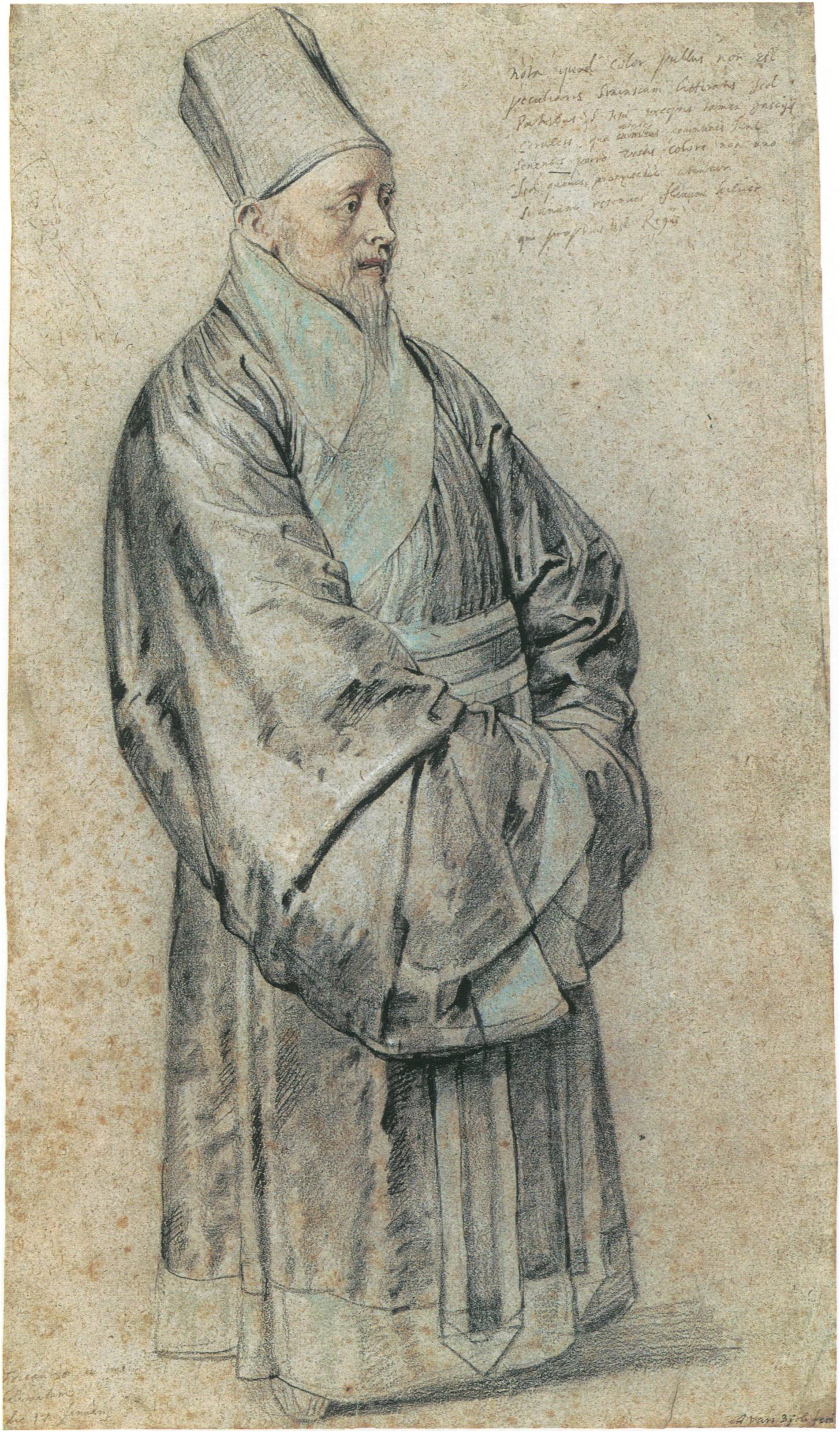
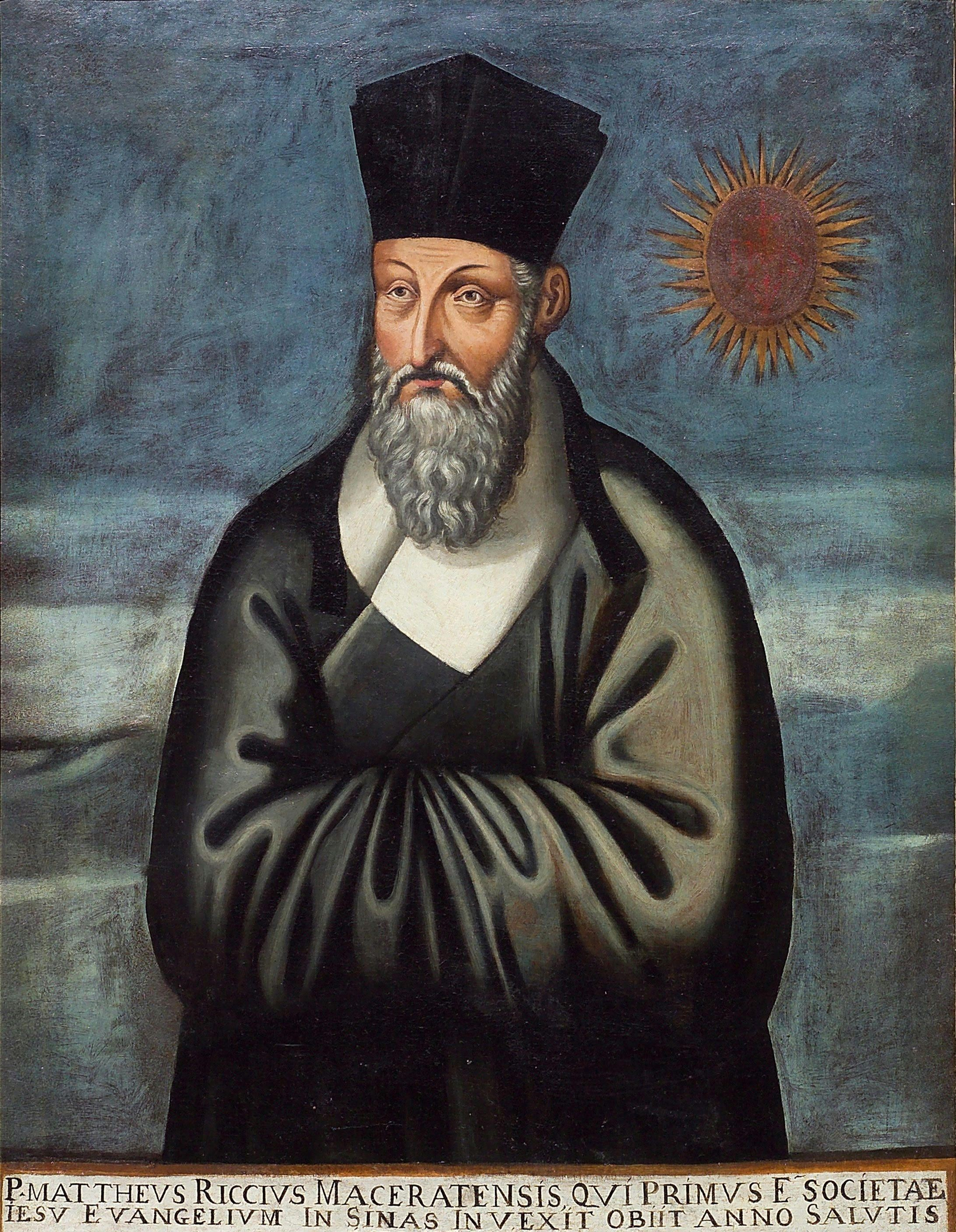
    Nicolas Trigault, by Rubens Matteo Ricci
  4. 1626–1628
    The first castle game, played before the shogun, takes place in 1626; in 1628 the castle games become an official yearly ceremony.
  5. 1645–1653
    The first official challenge match (sōgo) to decide the Meijin, between Hon'inbō Sanetsu (1611–1658) and Yasui Sanchi (1617–1703).
  6. c. 1650
    Huang Longshi, probably the strongest Chinese player of the Qing dynasty (1644–1912), is born (c. 1650 – c. 1694).
  7. 17th–18th century
    The philosopher Leibniz (1646–1716) publishes an article on Go with a picture of a game, saying he does not know all the rules.
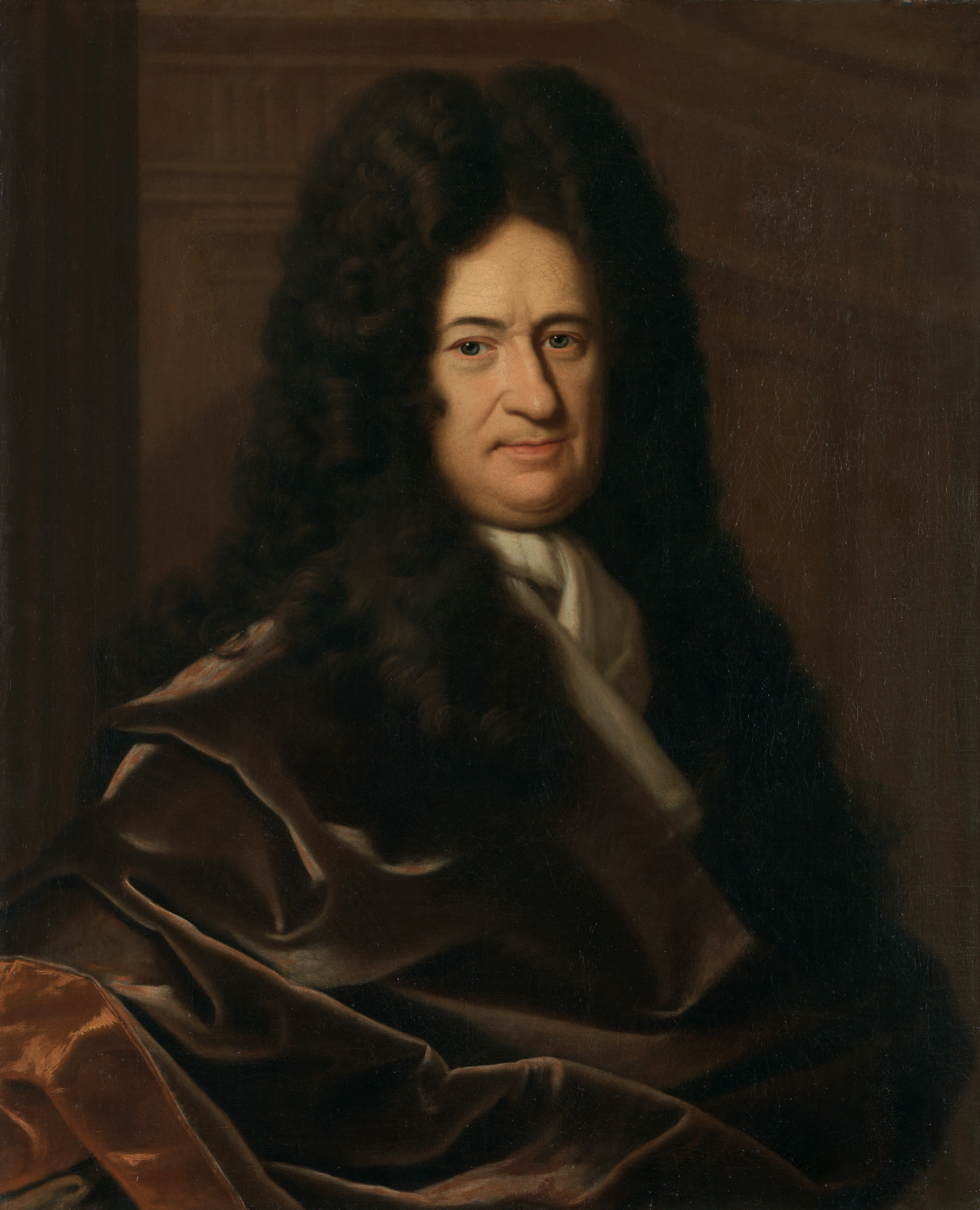
    Gottfried Wilhelm Leibniz
  8. Late 17th century
    The fourth Hon'inbō, Dōsaku (1645–1702), defeats every top player of his time and is praised as having "thirteen-dan strength".
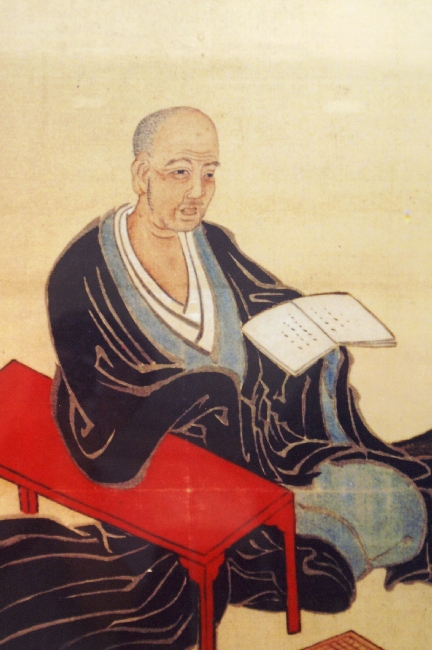
    Hon'inbō Dōsaku
  9. 1694
    Thomas Hyde (1636–1703) writes the first detailed description of Go in a European language, in his treatise on oriental board games.
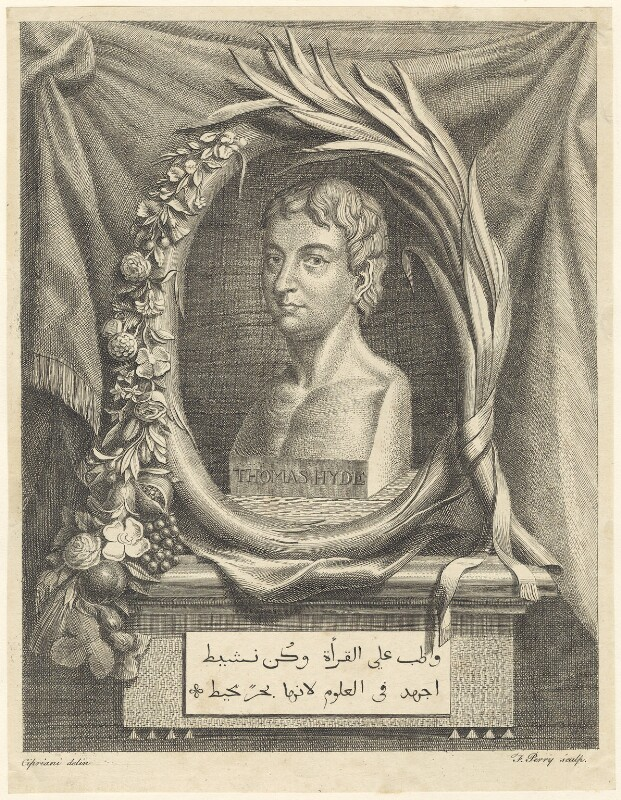
    Thomas Hyde
  10. 1713
    The Igo Hatsuyoron, a collection of very hard problems, is created.
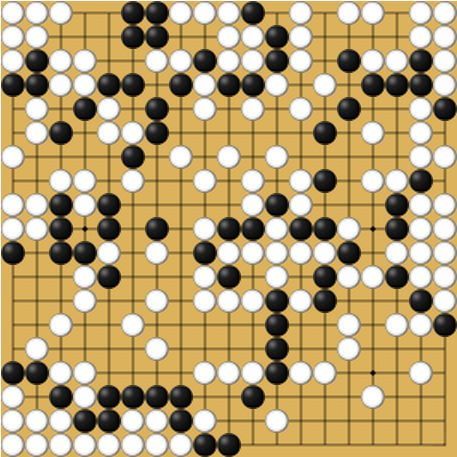
    Problem 76 of the Igo Hatsuyoron
  11. 1739
    Shi Xiangxia and Fan Xiping play the "Ten Games at Danghu" in Pinghu, Zhejiang.
  12. 1840
    The "blood-vomiting game": Hon'inbō Jōwa (1787–1847) beats Akaboshi Intetsu (1810–1835) in a week-long match; Akaboshi collapses from exhaustion and dies soon after.
  13. 1846
    The "ear-reddening game": Honinbo Shusaku (1829–1862)'s move 127 stuns Gennan Inseki (1798–1859), and becomes one of the best moves of all time.
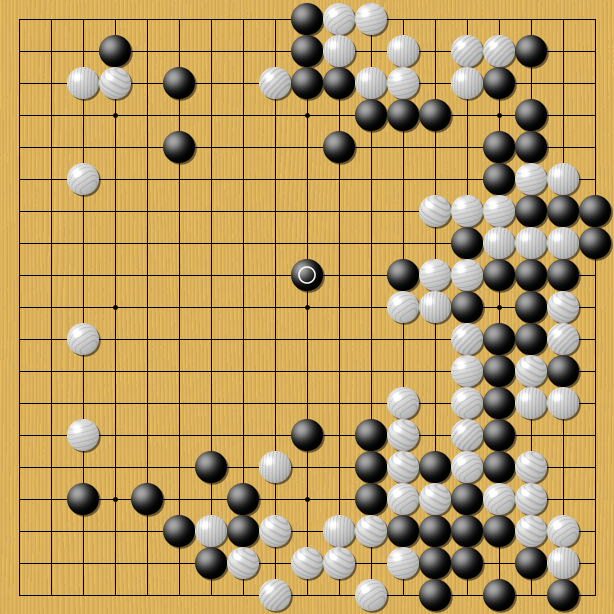
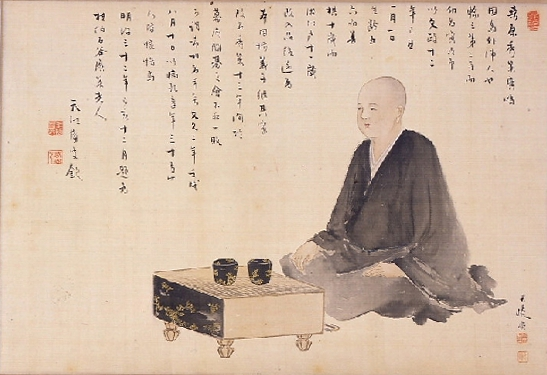
    The "ear-reddening" game Hon'inbō Shūsaku
  14. 1863
    The last castle games are played as the crisis of the shogunate disrupts the ceremonies.
4. === Modern professional Go ===
  1. 1868
    The Meiji Restoration (1866–1869) ends the official stipends of the Go houses; Go loses its patrons and the masters struggle.
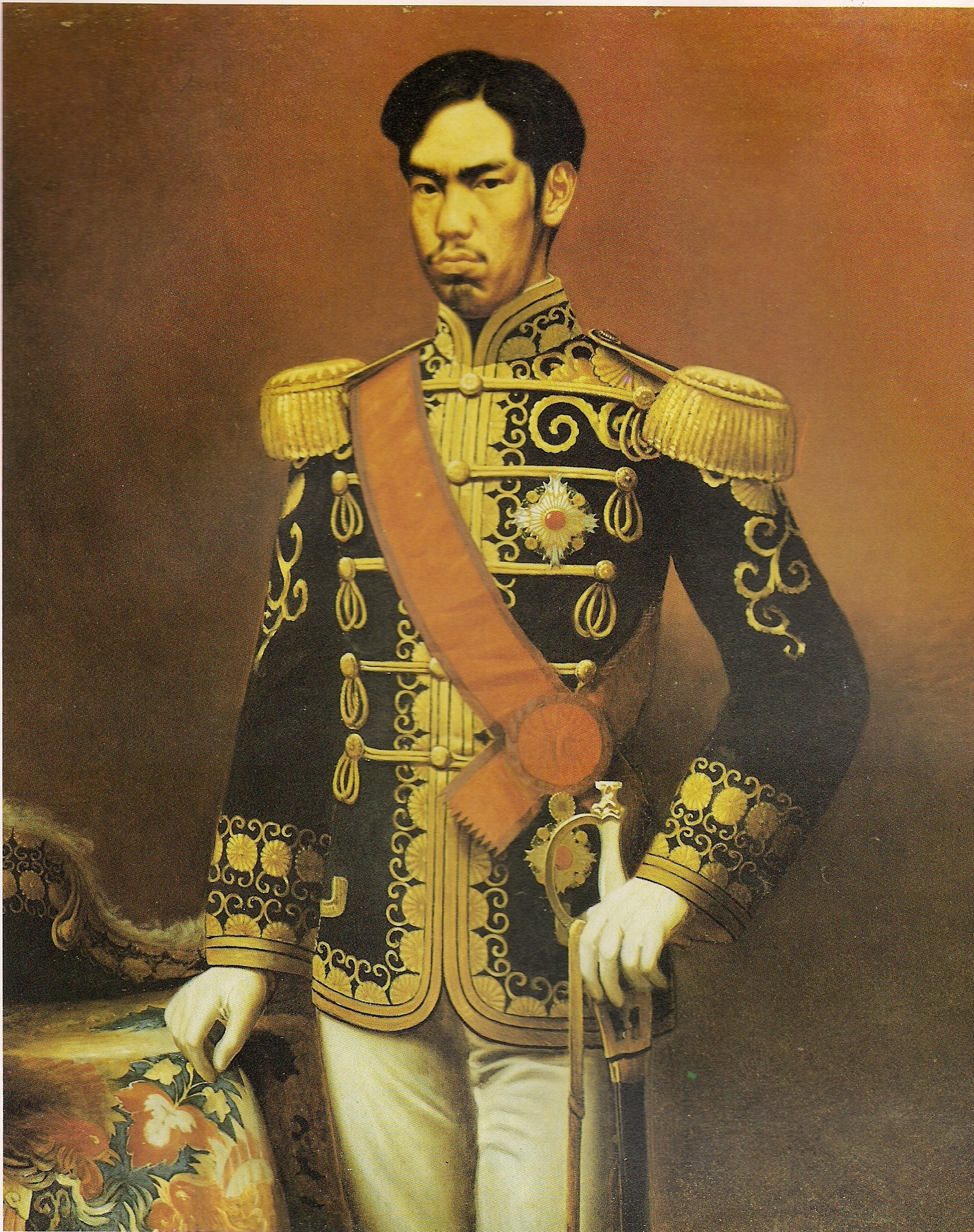
    Emperor Meiji
  2. 1872
    The first recorded game of Go in Europe is played between Kido Takayoshi (1833–1877) and Ōkubo Toshimichi (1830–1878) of the Iwakura Mission (1871–1873).
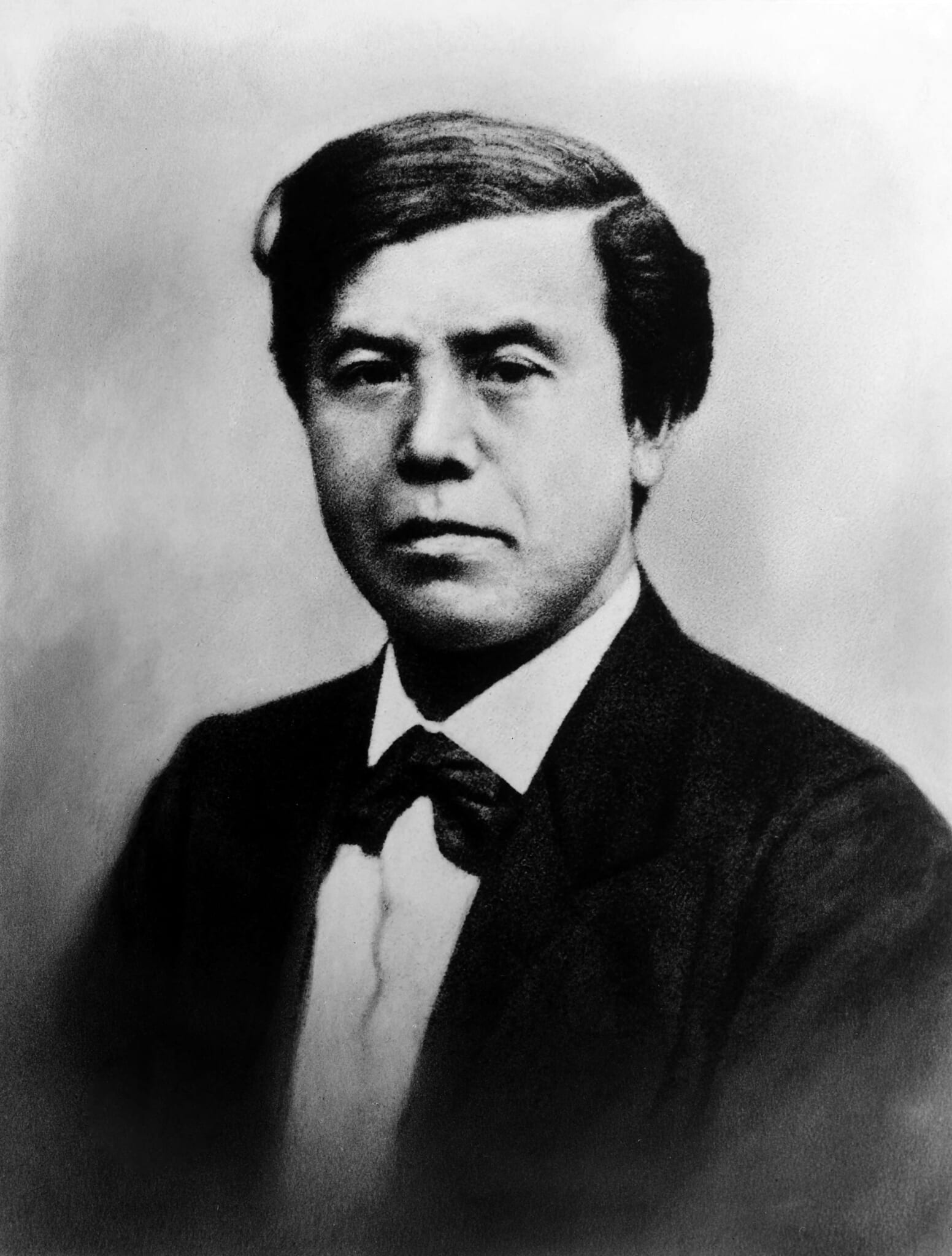
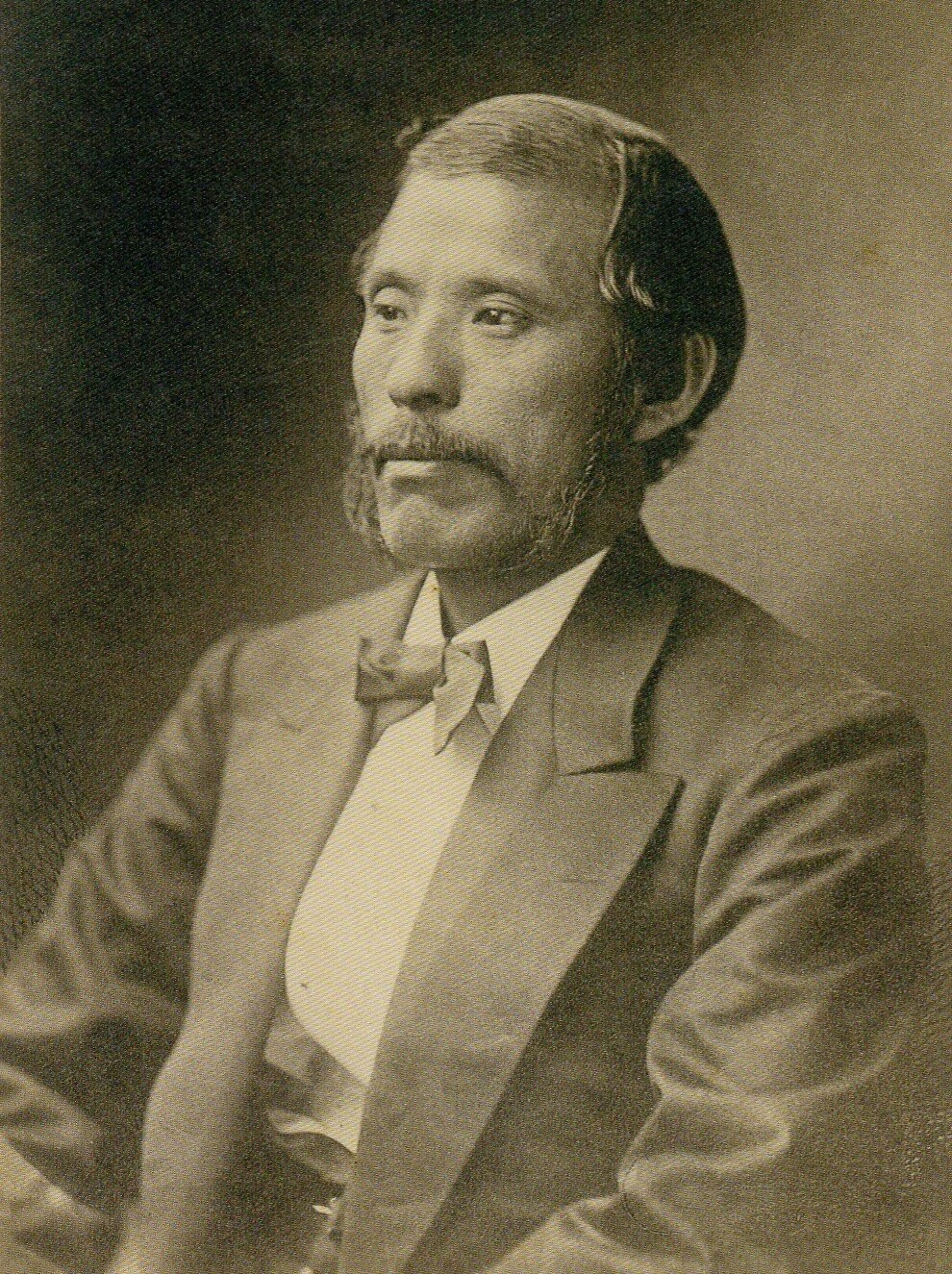
    Kido Takayoshi Ōkubo Toshimichi Members of the Iwakura Mission
  3. 1878
    The first newspaper Go column appears in Japan, on 1 April. In 1879 the Hoensha society forms; its journal Igo Shinpo is the first Go magazine.
  4. 1880
    Oskar Korschelt (1853–1940), who learned the game in Japan from Murase Shūho, publishes Das Go Spiel: the first systematic description in a Western language.
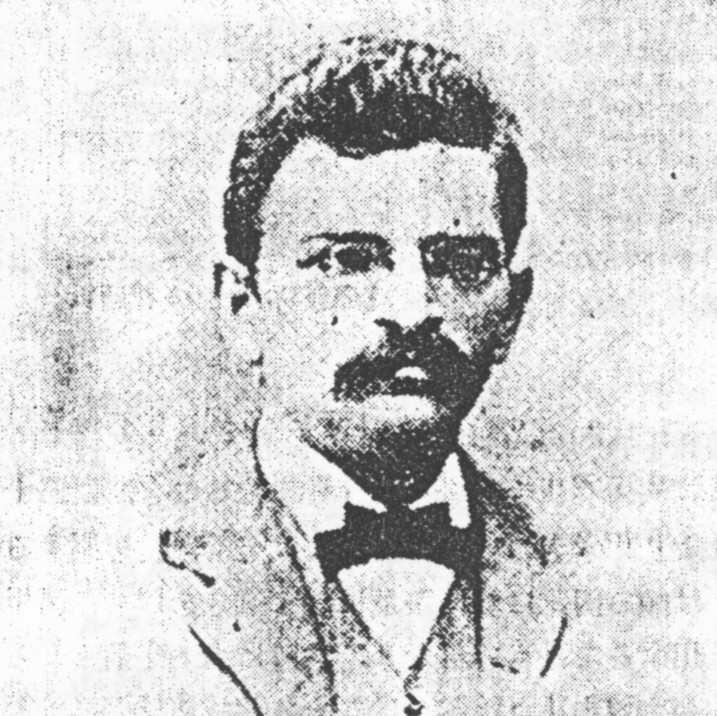
    Oskar Korschelt
  5. 1905–1908
    Edward Lasker (1885–1981) learns Go in Berlin (1905) and later founds the New York Go Club; in 1908 Arthur Smith publishes the first Go book in English, The Game of Go.
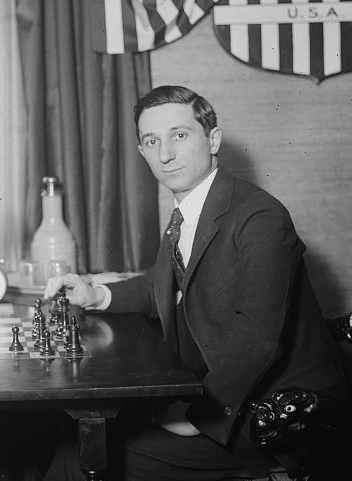
    Edward Lasker
  6. 1909–1910
    The Japanese professional Takabe Dōhei (1881–1951) visits China and introduces play without fixed starting stones.
  7. 1924
    The Nihon Ki-in, Japan's professional Go association, is founded, ending the hereditary house system and inaugurating the modern rank and tournament system.
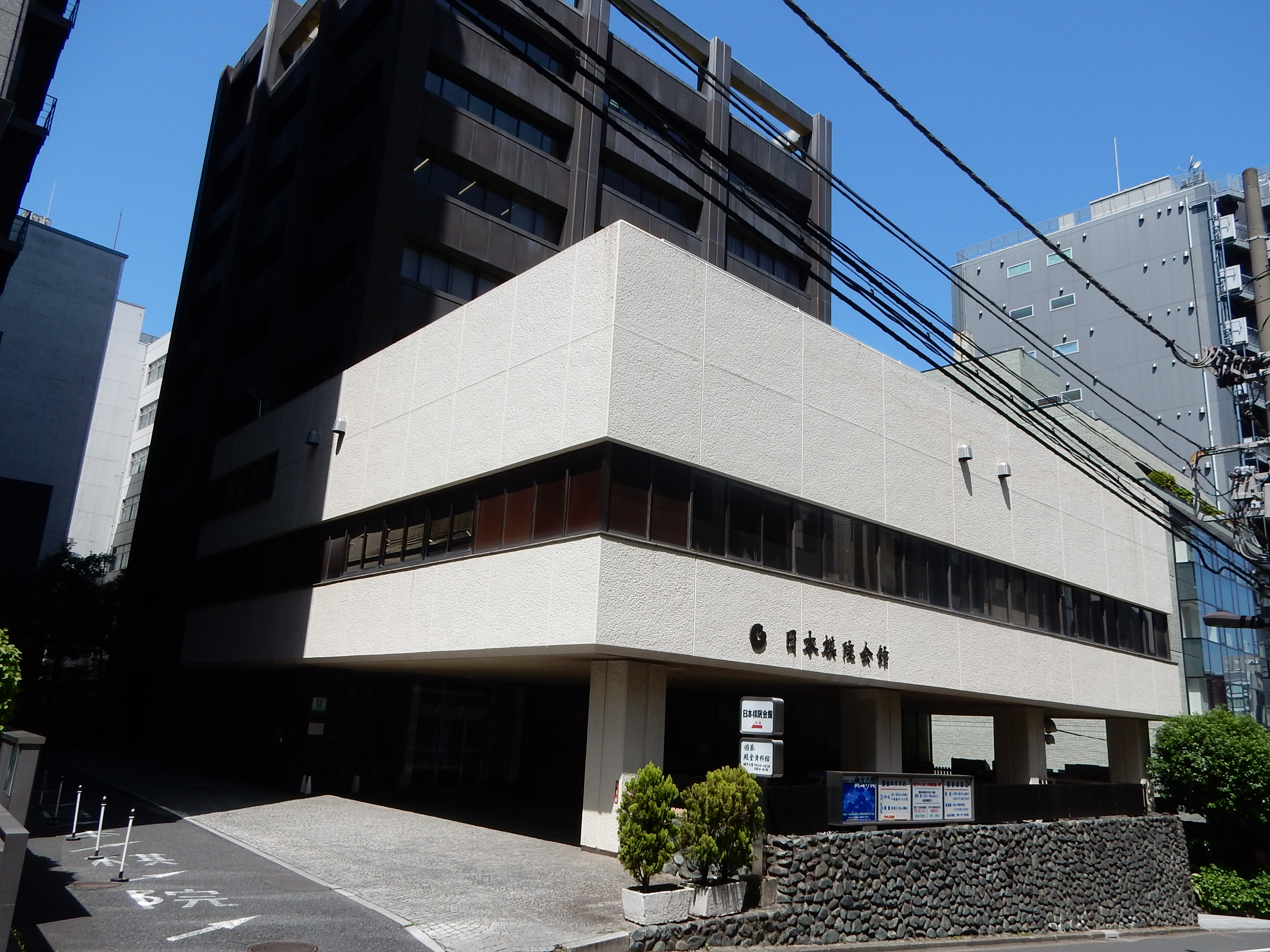
    The Nihon Ki-in headquarters
  8. 1933
    The "Game of the Century": Go Seigen (1914–2014) opens at the three-three, star and center points against Honinbo Shusai (1874–1940), in a controversial three-month game that challenges the old system.
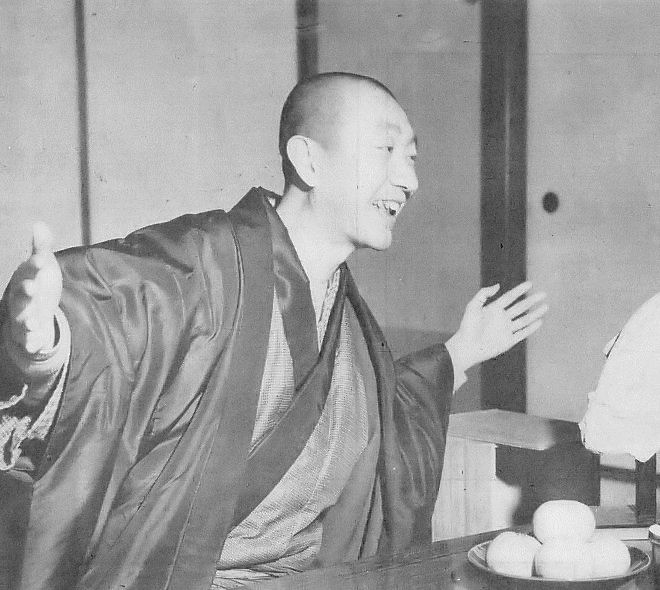
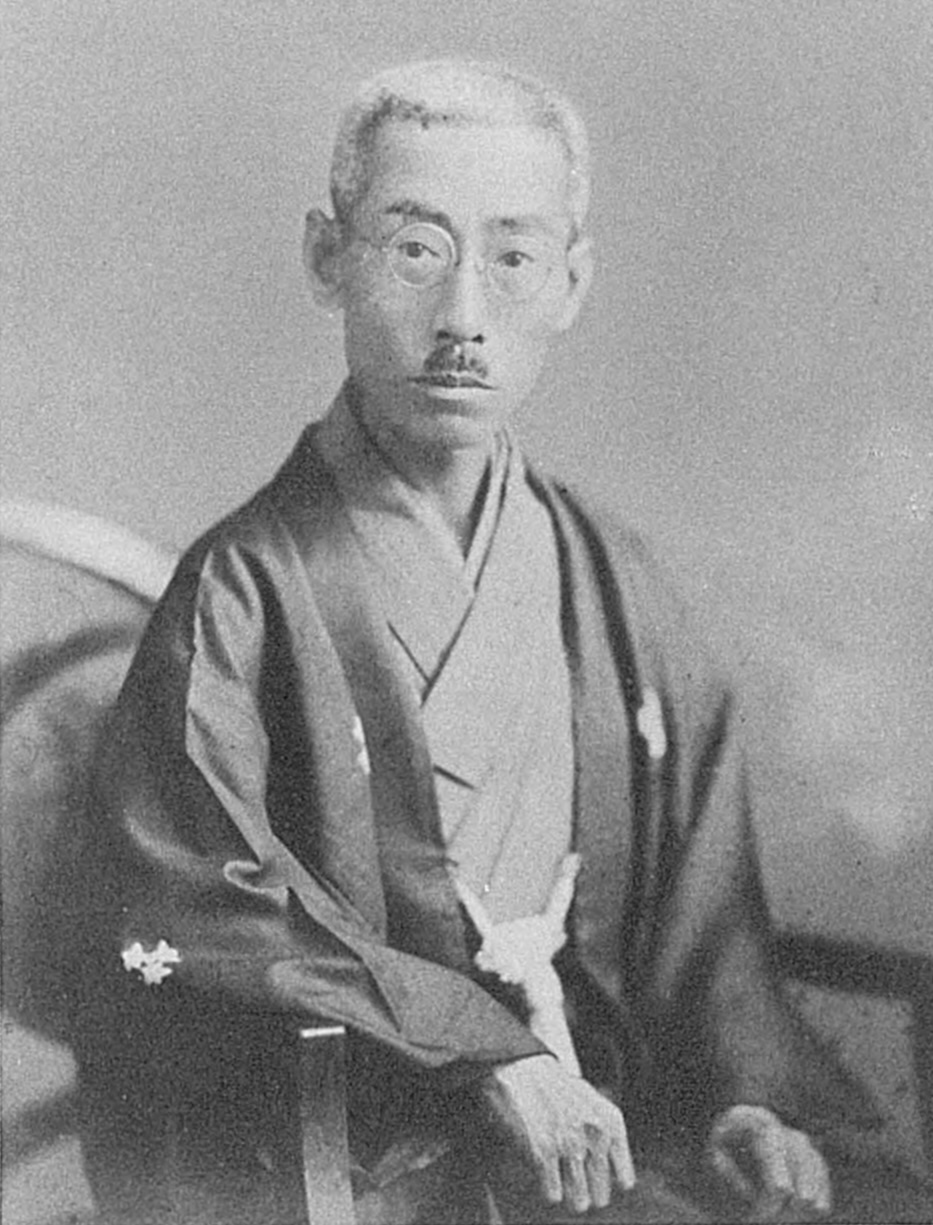
    The "Game of the Century": Shūsai (white) against Go Seigen (black) Go Seigen Hon'inbō Shūsai
  9. 1934–1937
    Lasker's Go and Go-moku (1934) helps popularize the game in the US; the American Go Association is formed in 1935 and the German Go Association in 1937.
  10. 1935
    A game of Go is broadcast on radio for the first time.
  11. 1936–1938
    Shūsai hands the Hon'inbō title to the Nihon Ki-in (1936) and retires in 1938 after a game against Kitani Minoru (1909–1975) that inspires the novel The Master of Go by Yasunari Kawabata (1899–1972).
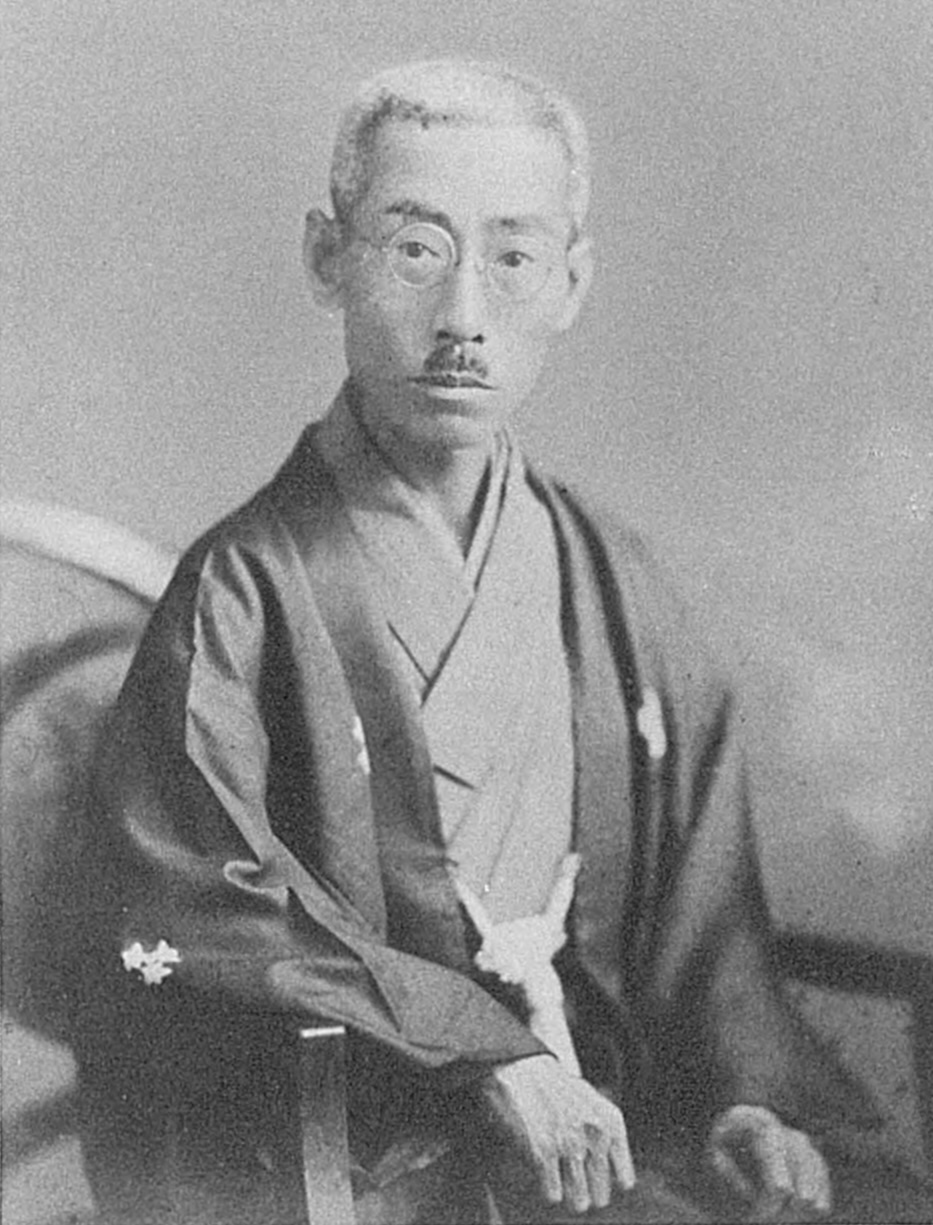
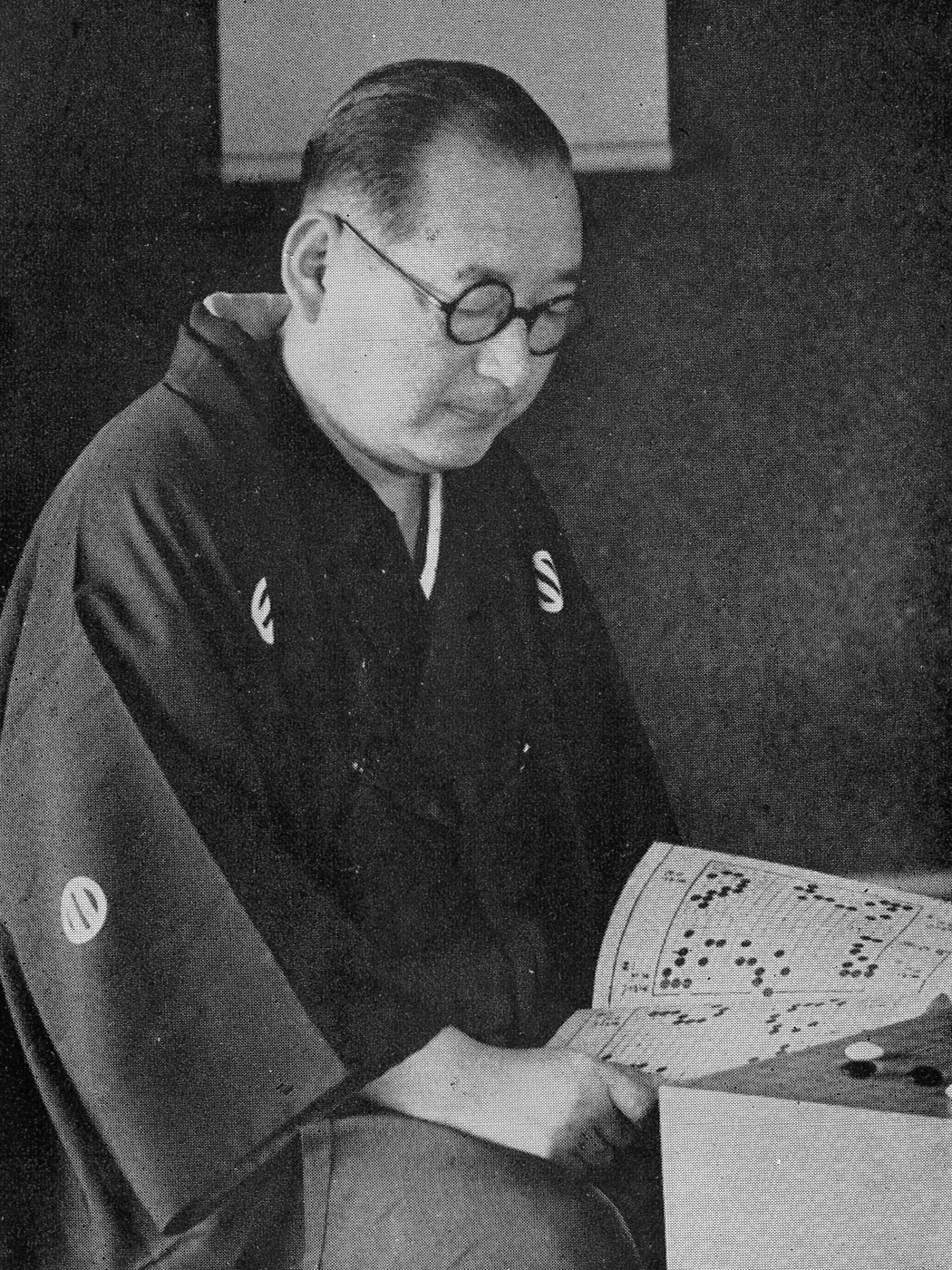
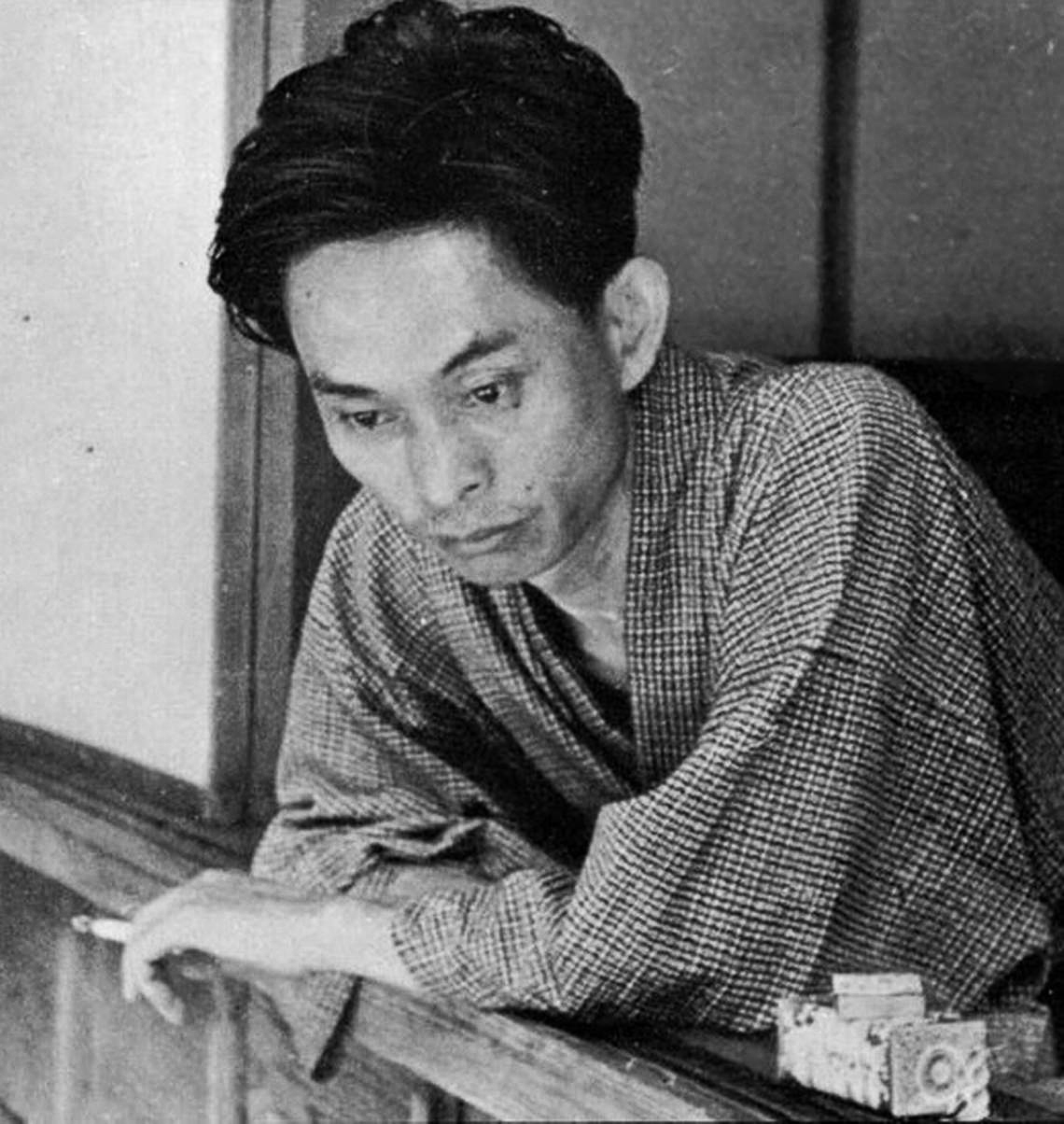
    Hon'inbō Shūsai Kitani Minoru Yasunari Kawabata
  12. 1941
    Sekiyama Riichi (1909–1970) wins the first Hon'inbō title tournament, one of the first major modern tournaments with komi (4.5 points).
  13. 1945
    The "Game Under the Atomic Bomb": the second game of the 3rd Hon'inbō match, played near Hiroshima on August 6, is finished after the blast.
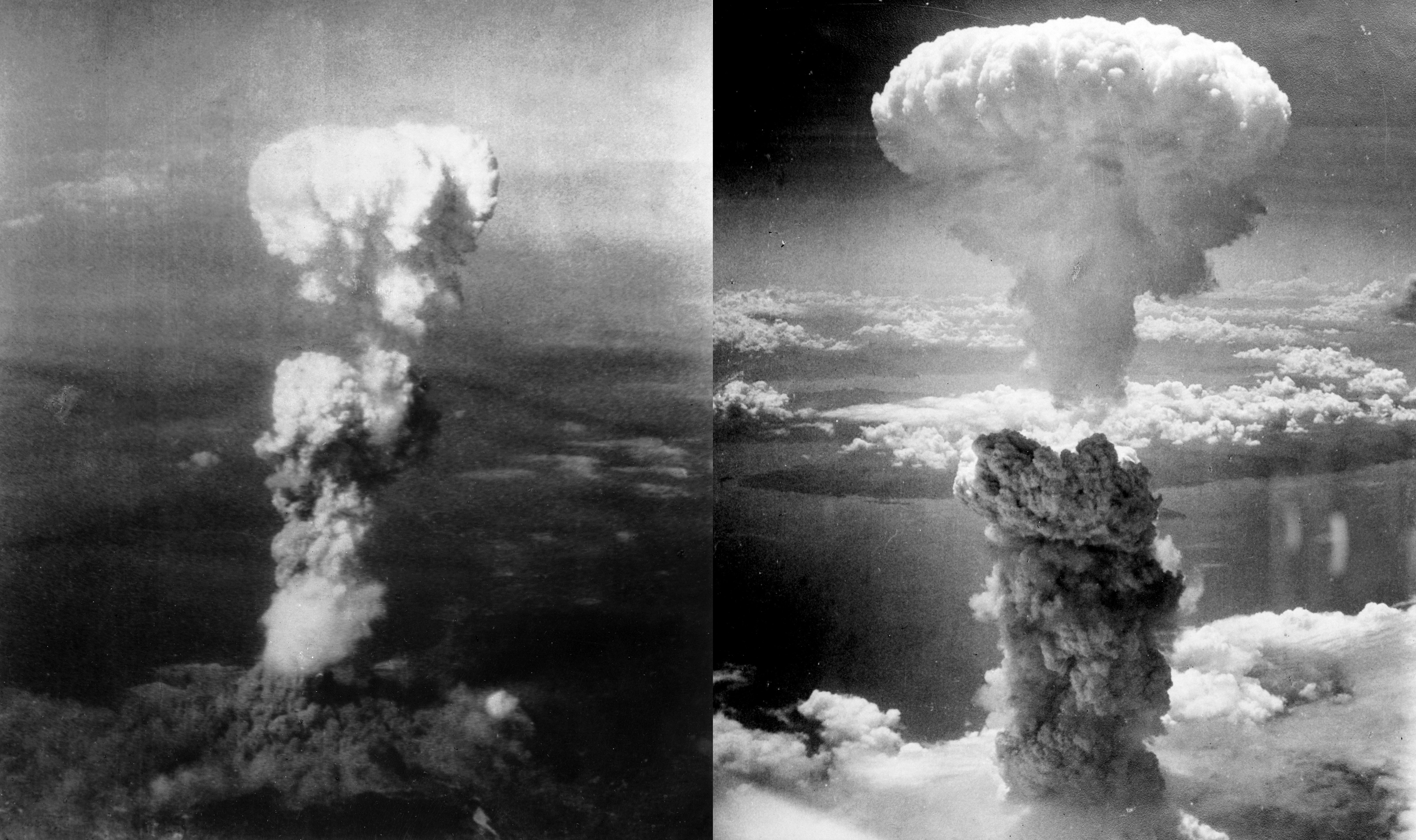
    The atomic bombings of Hiroshima (left) and Nagasaki (right)
  14. 1949
    Fujisawa Hōsai (1919–1993) becomes the first player to reach 9 dan under the Oteai promotion system.
  15. 1950
    Go Seigen is awarded 9 dan, and becomes the world's best player; he wins his ten-game matches against all top rivals until 1956.
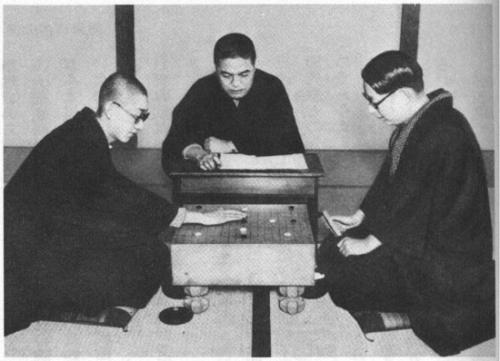
    Go Seigen and Kitani Minoru
  16. January 1950
    (China) (Japan) Go Seigen becomes the world no. 1.
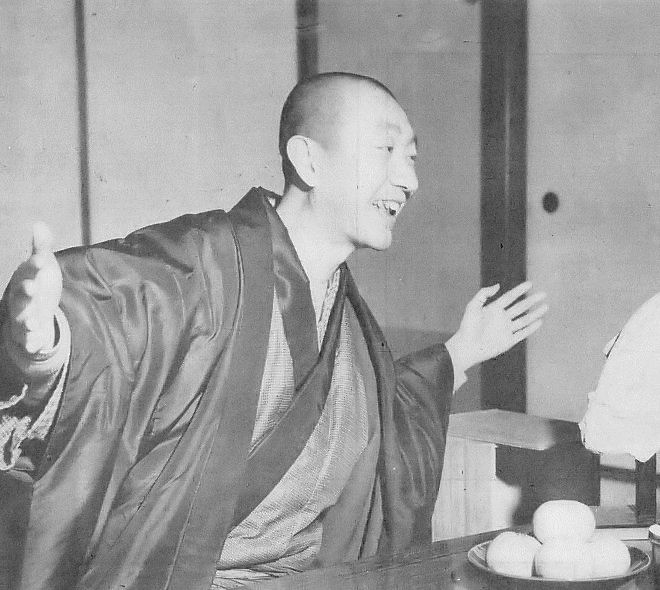
    Go Seigen
  17. 1954
    The Korea Baduk Association (Hankuk Kiwon) is established, on 28 January. The first NHK Cup is broadcast on radio; it moves to television in 1962.
  18. 1956
    The first professional tournament in Korea, the Kuksu Cup, starts.
  19. January 1959
    (Japan) Sakata Eio (1920–2010) becomes the world no. 1.
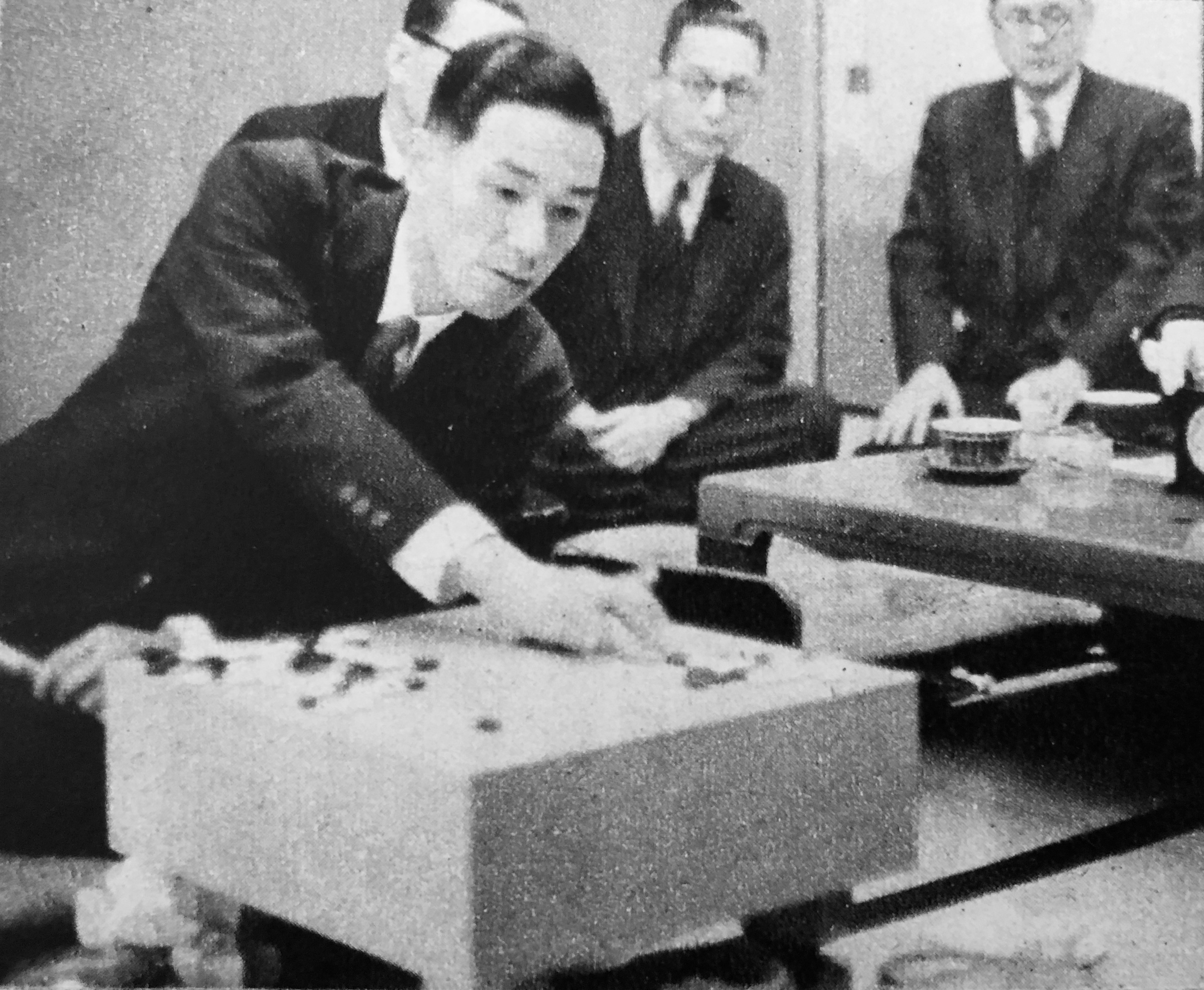
    Sakata Eio
  20. 1960
    The China–Japan Go Friendship Match starts; it is held every year until 1991.
  21. 1962
    Fujisawa Shūkō (1925–2009) wins the first Meijin title tournament.
  22. 1968
    Albert Zobrist (born 1942) writes the first program that plays complete games of Go.
  23. January 1969
    (Taiwan) (Japan) Rin Kaiho (born 1942) becomes the world no. 1.
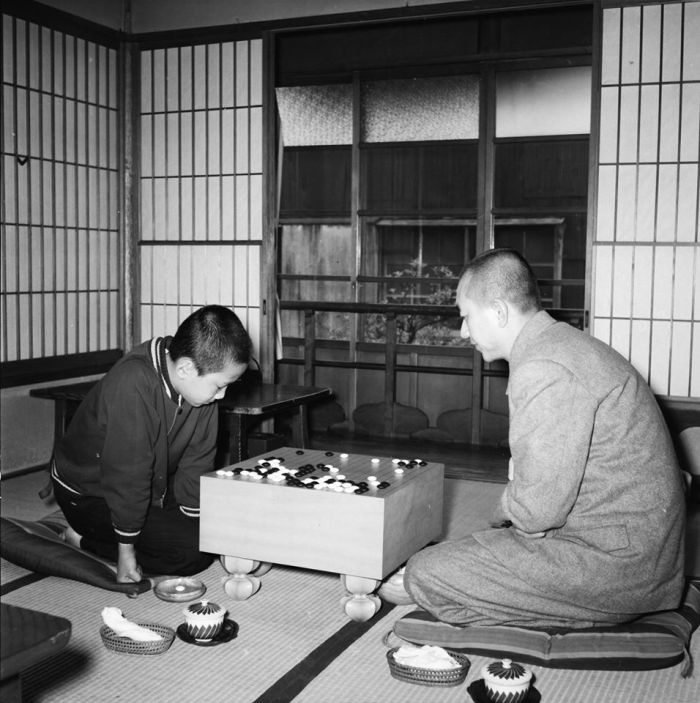
    Go Seigen teaching a young Rin Kaiho
  24. June 1975
    (Japan) Kato Masao (1947–2004) becomes the world no. 1.
  25. 1976
    After the "Meijin Incident" of 1974, the Tengen (1975), Kisei and Gosei (1976) titles complete the seven major Japanese titles. Fujisawa Shūkō wins the first Kisei in 1977.
  26. 19 December 1976
    A friendship match between Taiwan and the United States is played by teletype; in 1978 the UK and the USSR play one by telephone.
  27. 1978
    Manfred Wimmer (1944–1995) becomes the first Westerner to receive a professional certificate from an East Asian Go association (Kansai Ki-in); James Kerwin is the first at the Nihon Ki-in.
  28. November 1979
    (South Korea) (Japan) Cho Chikun (born 1956) becomes the world no. 1.
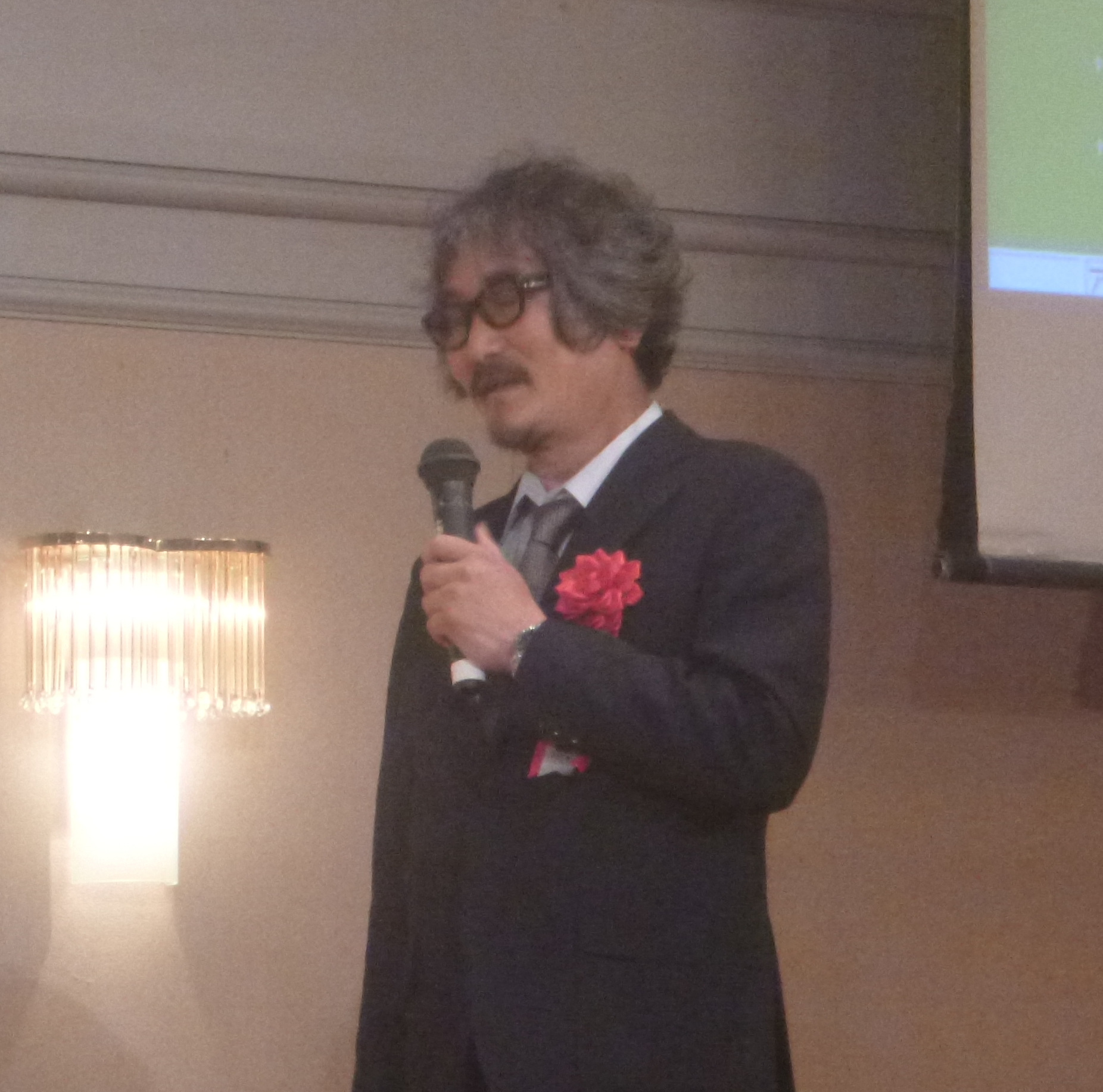
    Cho Chikun
  29. July 1982
    (South Korea) Cho Hunhyun (born 1953) becomes the world no. 1.
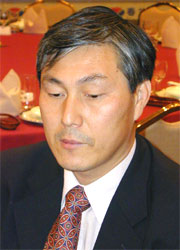
    Cho Hunhyun
  30. 1984
    Nie Weiping (1952–2026) leads China to victory over Japan in the first China–Japan Super Go Matches, a national triumph.
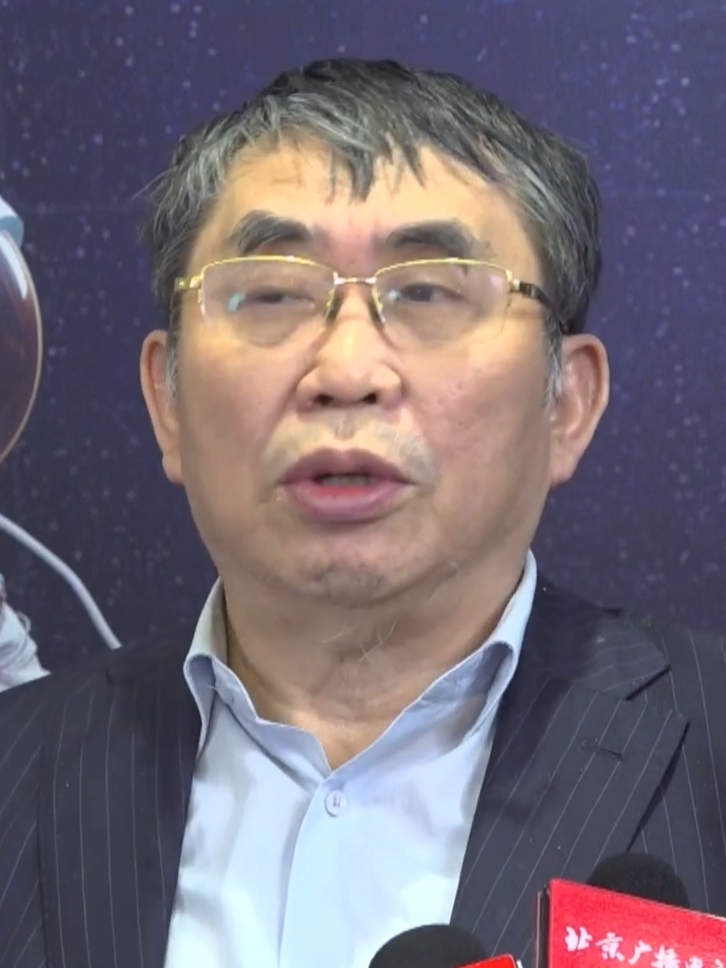
    Nie Weiping
  31. 1984
    The first computer Go event, the Acornsoft tournament for the BBC Micro, is held. Greg Hale writes inetgo, probably the first program to play Go over the internet.
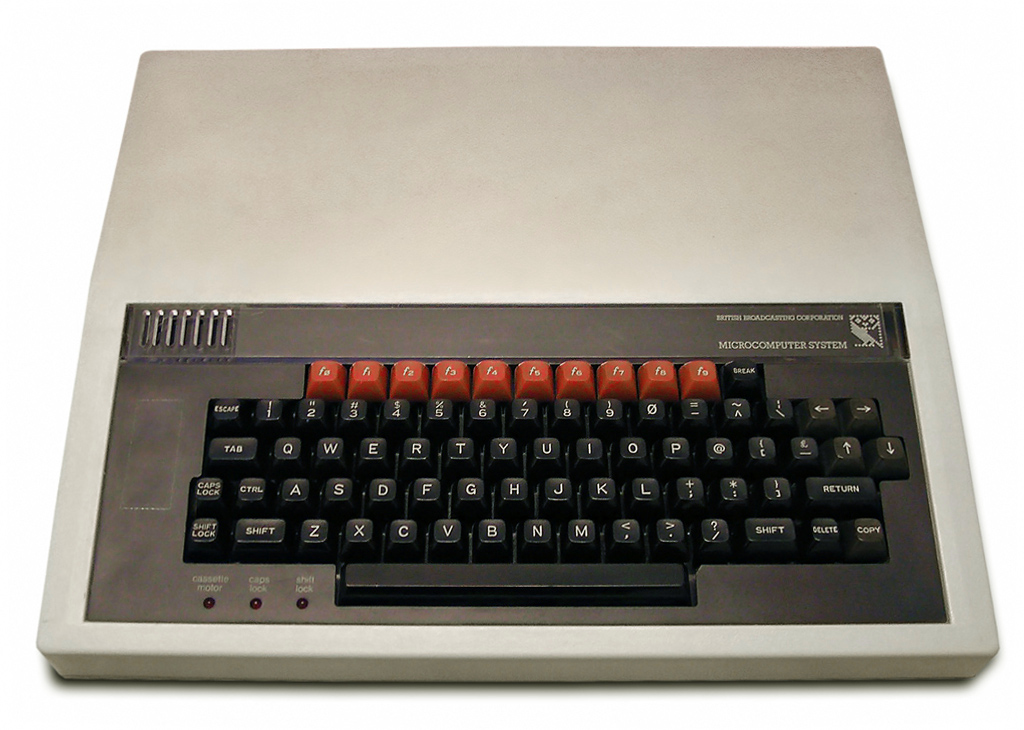
    A BBC Micro
  32. 1985
    The Ing Prize for computer programs starts; it expires in 2000, when the last challenge was won by HandTalk at an 11-stone handicap against a young professional.
  33. 1988
    Takemiya Masaki (born 1951) wins the first Fujitsu Cup, one of the first international tournaments.
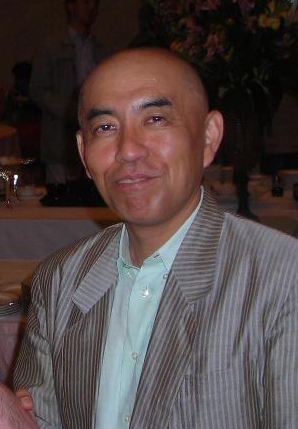
    Takemiya Masaki
  34. 1989
    Cho Hunhyun, the only Korean entrant, wins the first Ing Cup, the "Olympics of Go", beating Nie Weiping.
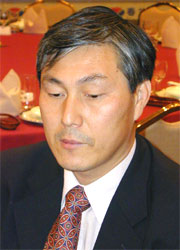
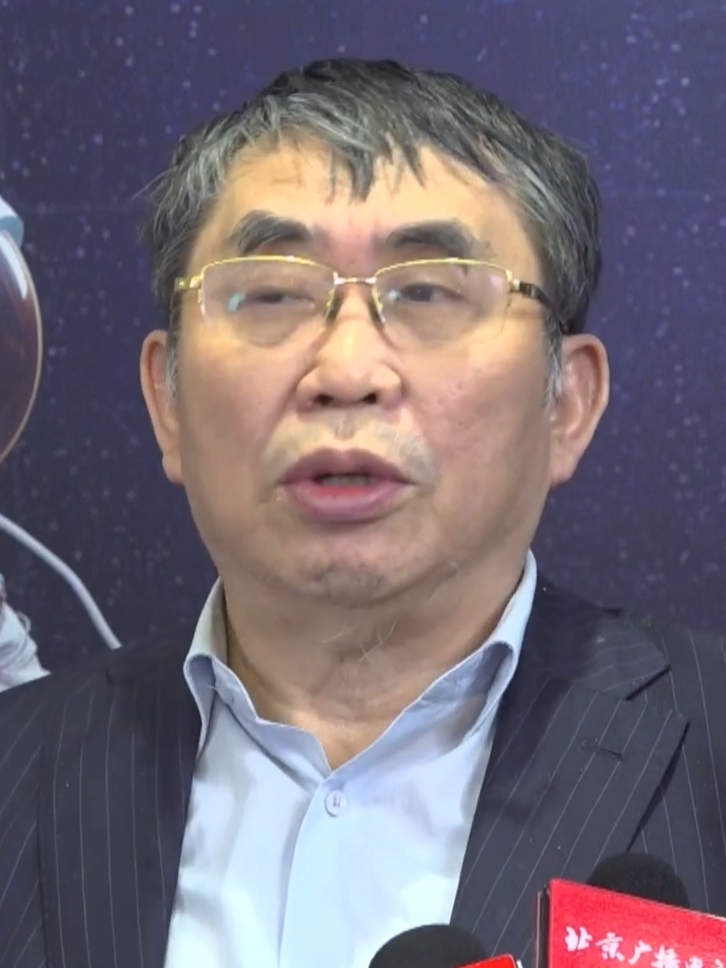
    Cho Hunhyun Nie Weiping
  35. October 1990
    (South Korea) Lee Changho (born 1975), a student of Cho Hunhyun, becomes the world no. 1 at 15 years old.
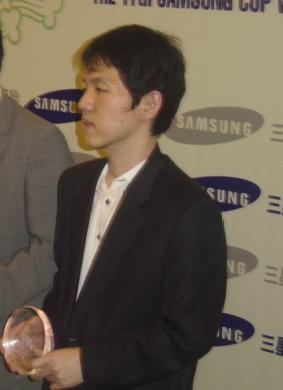
    Lee Changho
  36. 2 February 1992
    The Internet Go Server (IGS), the first server dedicated to Go, starts.
  37. 1993
    Bruegmann's Gobble is the first Go program based on random playouts (Monte Carlo).
  38. 1995
    Ma Xiaochun (born 1964) is the first Chinese player to win an international tournament, taking both the Fujitsu Cup and the Tongyang Securities Cup.
  39. 1996
    Lee Changho wins the first LG Cup.
  40. 1996
    Astronauts Daniel Barry (born 1953) and Koichi Wakata (born 1963) become the first people to play Go in space.
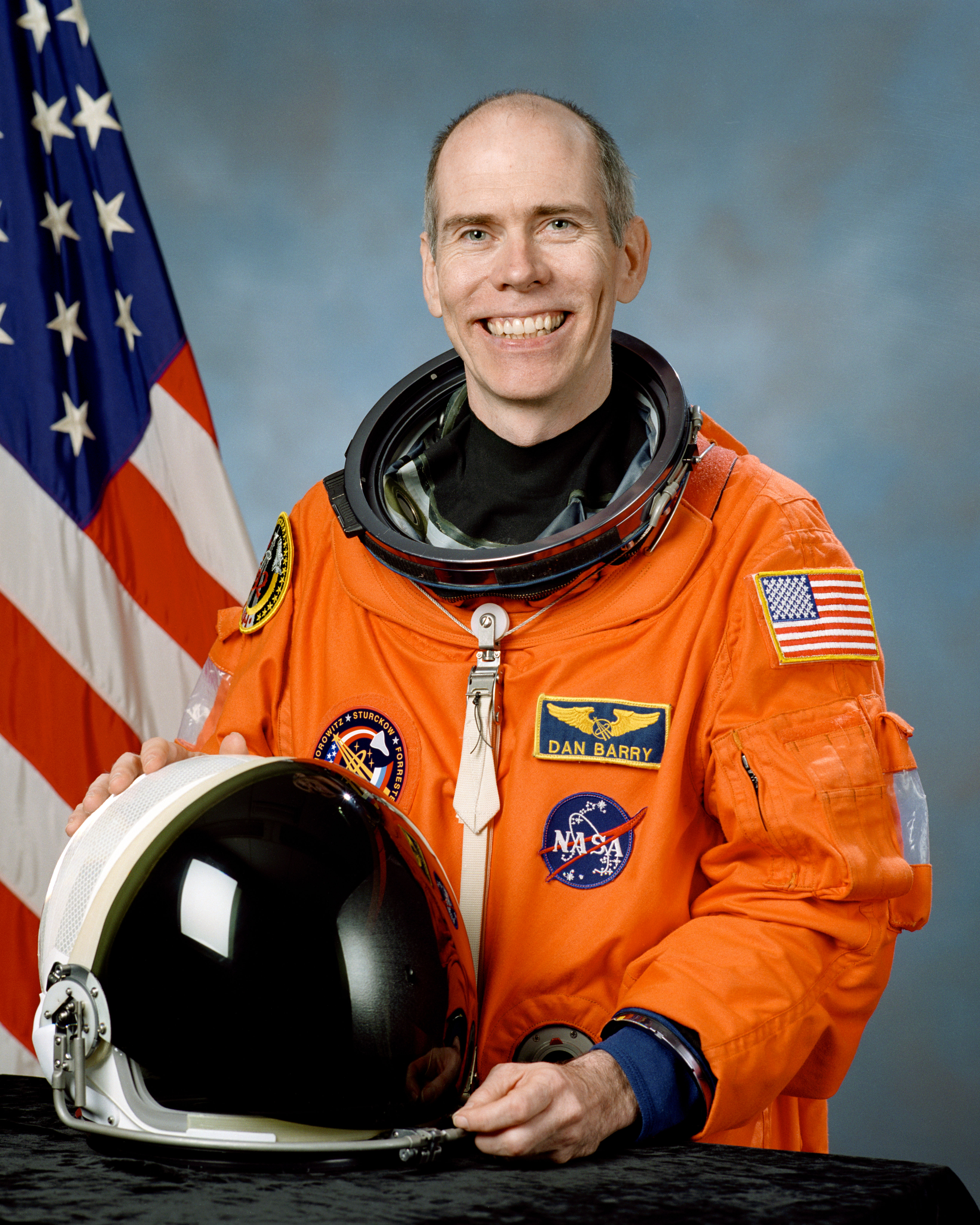
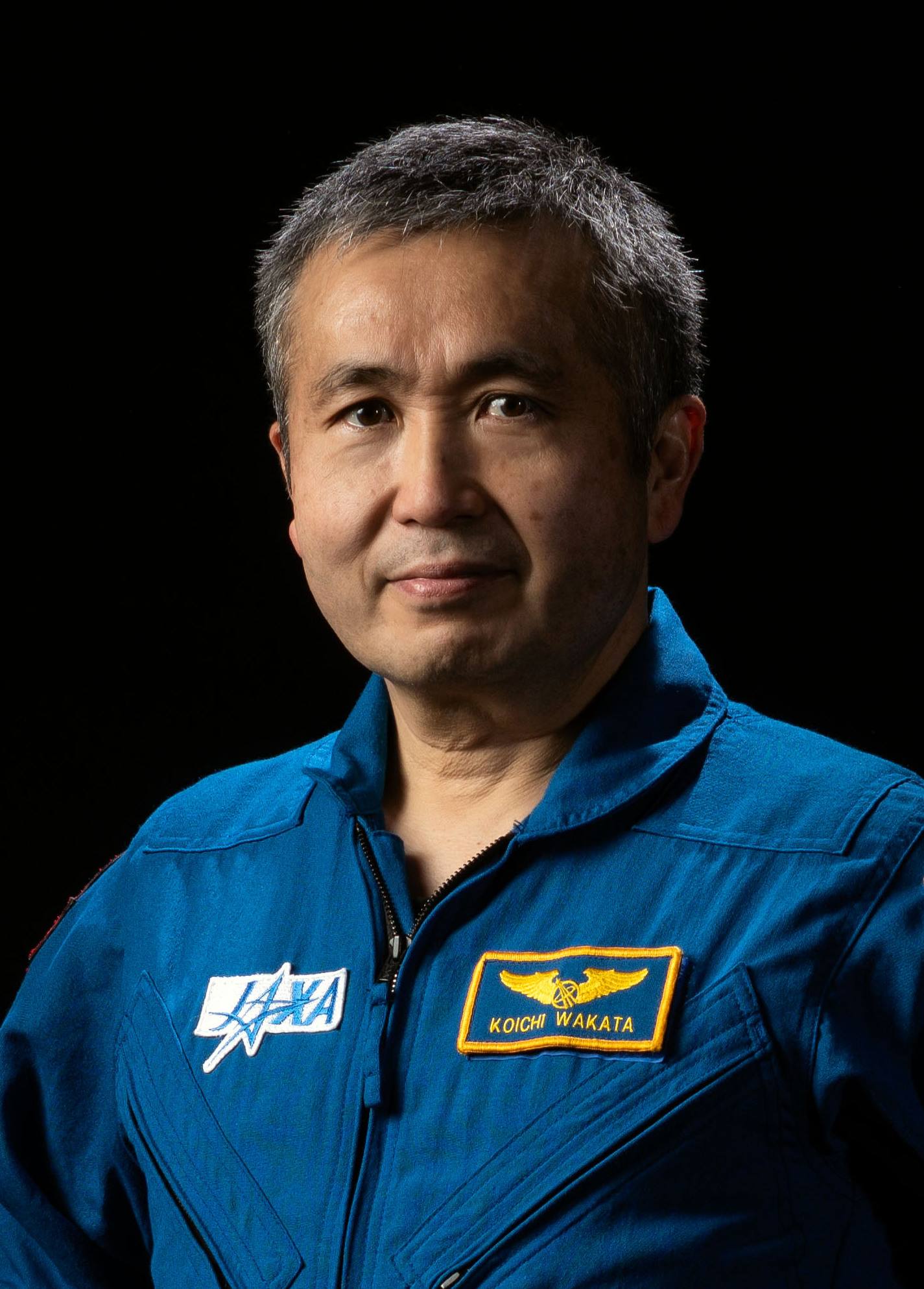
    Daniel Barry Koichi Wakata
  41. 1998–2003
    The manga Hikaru no Go (later also an anime) sparks a Go boom among young players in Japan.
  42. 2000
    Rui Naiwei (born 1963), playing for Korea, wins the 43rd Kuksu in February and becomes the first woman to win a major title.
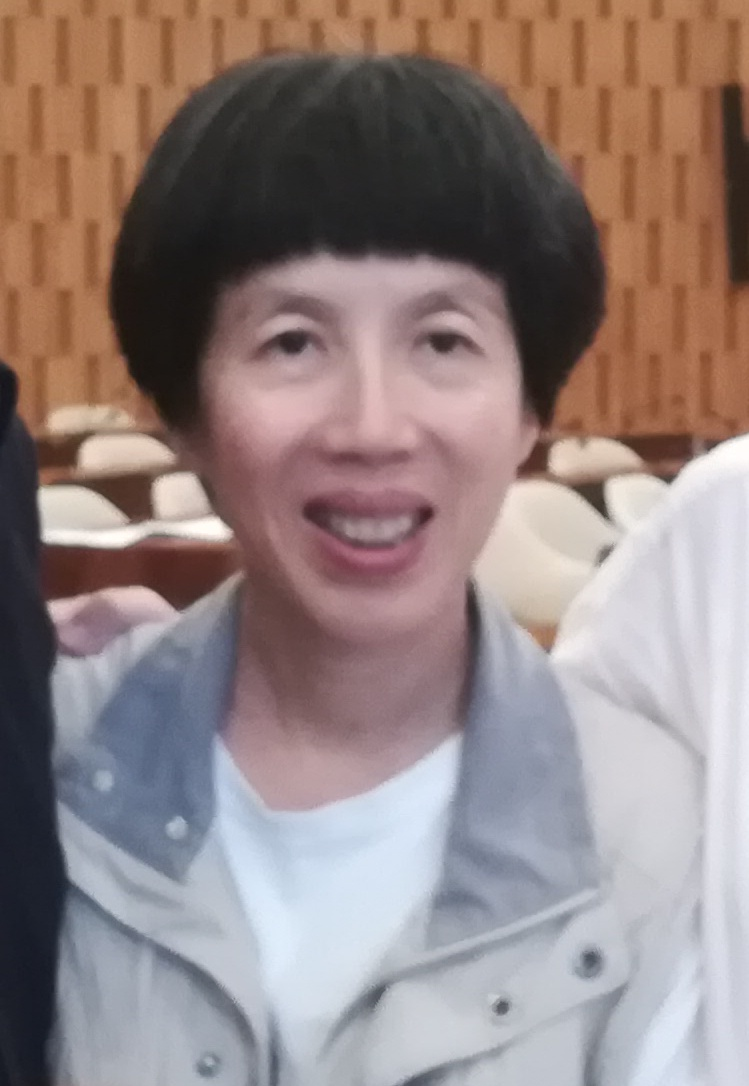
    Rui Naiwei
  43. 2000
    The American Michael Redmond (born 1963) is the first Westerner to reach 9 dan.
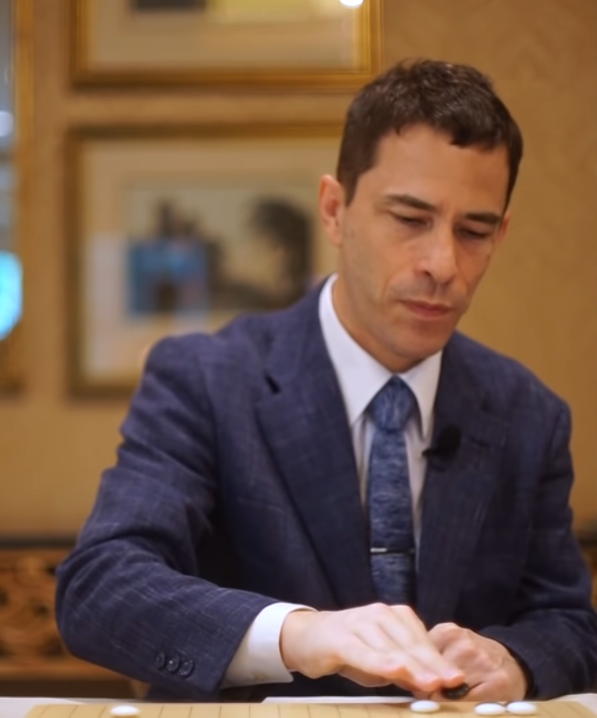
    Michael Redmond in 2018
  44. 2003
    The Oteai promotion system is discontinued in Japan and a new one introduced.
  45. January 2006
    (China) Gu Li (born 1983) becomes the world no. 1.
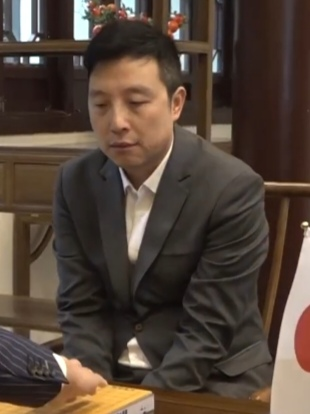
    Gu Li
  46. 2006
    The UCT algorithm, a Monte Carlo tree search, is developed; a program using it, CrazyStone, wins the Computer Olympiad 9×9 Go event the same year.
  47. July 2006
    (South Korea) Lee Sedol (born 1983) becomes the world no. 1.
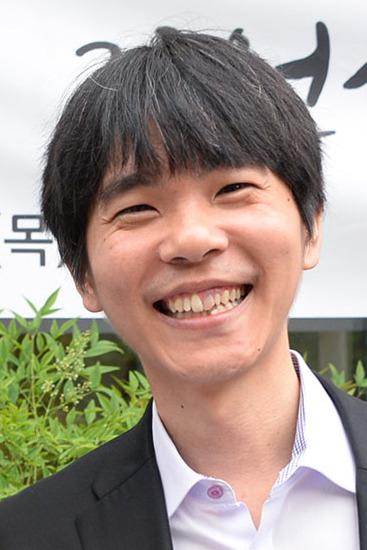
    Lee Sedol
  48. 2008
    MoGo wins one of three games against the professional Catalin Taranu on 9×9 and later beats an 8-dan Korean professional on 19×19 with a 9-stone handicap.
  49. 2011–2014
    The American Go Association signs an agreement with the Korean Baduk Association to promote its own professional system (2011); the European Go Federation creates its own (2014).
  50. July 2011
    (South Korea) Park Junghwan (born 1993) becomes the world no. 1.
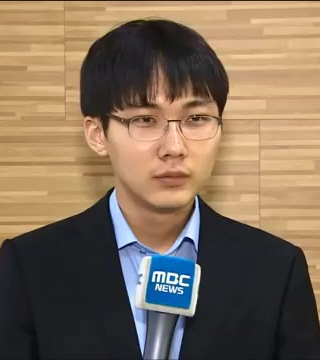
    Park Junghwan
  51. 2012
    The program Zen beats Takemiya Masaki in games with 5 and 4 handicap stones.
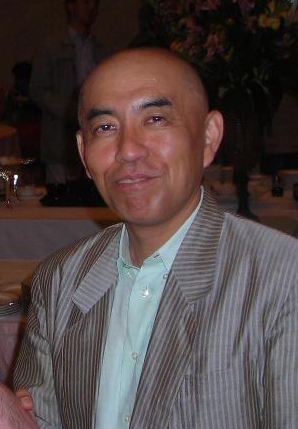
    Takemiya Masaki
  52. May 2015
    (China) Ke Jie (born 1997) becomes the world no. 1.
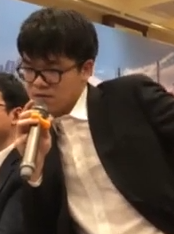
    Ke Jie
5. === The AI era ===
  1. October 2015
    AlphaGo, made by Google's DeepMind, beats the European champion Fan Hui (2p) 5–0 in even games: the first time a program beats a professional.
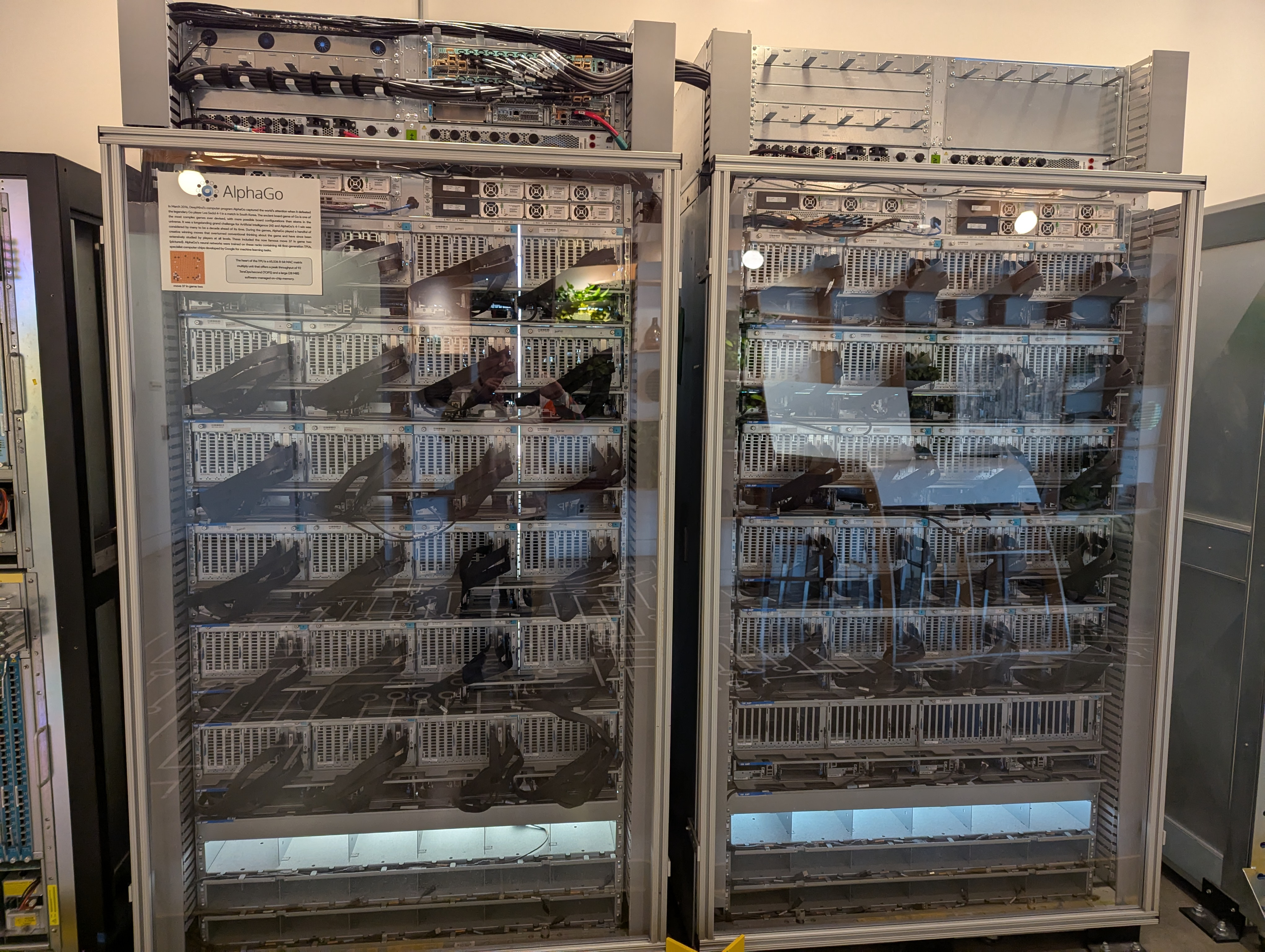
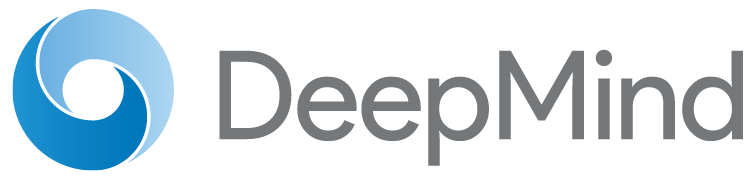
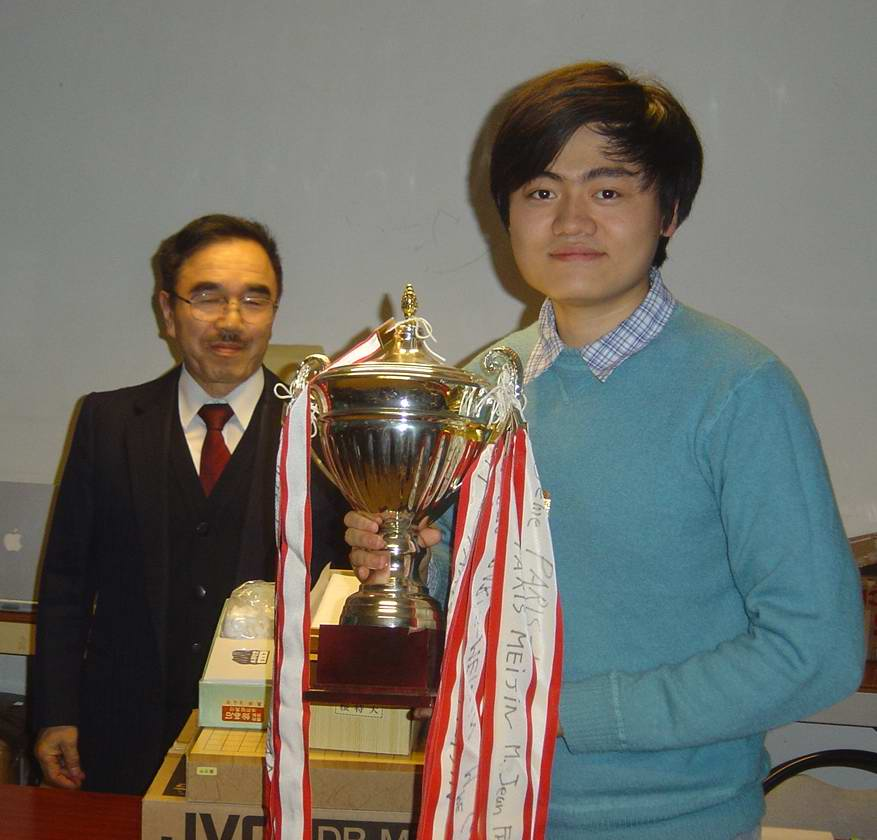
    An AlphaGo computer rack Logo of AlphaGo Logo of DeepMind Fan Hui
  2. 2016
    DeepMind's AlphaGo beats Lee Sedol (born 1983) 4–1 in Seoul, the first time an AI beats a top professional. The same year, Iyama Yūta (born 1989) holds all seven Japanese major titles at once.
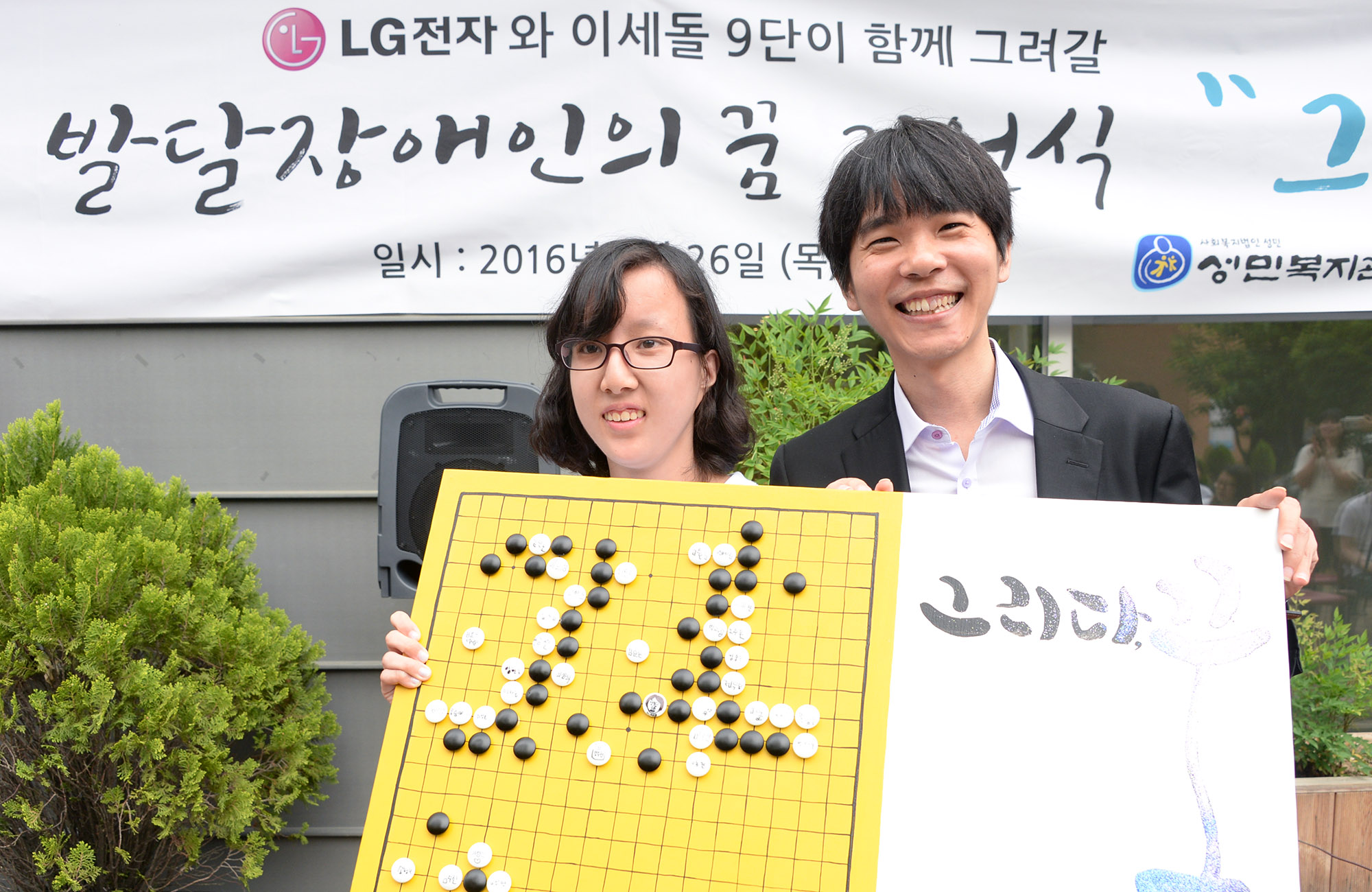
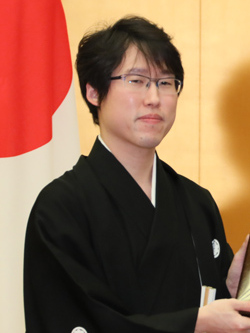
    Lee Sedol in 2016 Iyama Yūta
  3. Late 2016 – early 2017
    A stronger version of DeepMind's AlphaGo ("Master") wins 60 games in a row, anonymously, online against top professionals.
    Logo of AlphaGo
  4. May 2017
    DeepMind's new and much improved AlphaGo plays Ke Jie (born 1997) and wins all three games; Ke Jie says its play is "like a god of Go".
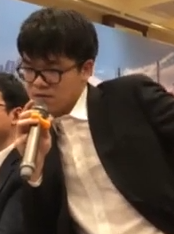
    Ke Jie Logo of AlphaGo
  5. August 2017
    (South Korea) Park Junghwan (born 1993) becomes the world no. 1 for the second time.
  6. May 2018
    (South Korea) Shin Jinseo (born 2000), whose style resembles that of the AIs, becomes the world no. 1.
  7. 2019
    The open-source Go AI KataGo is created by David Wu.
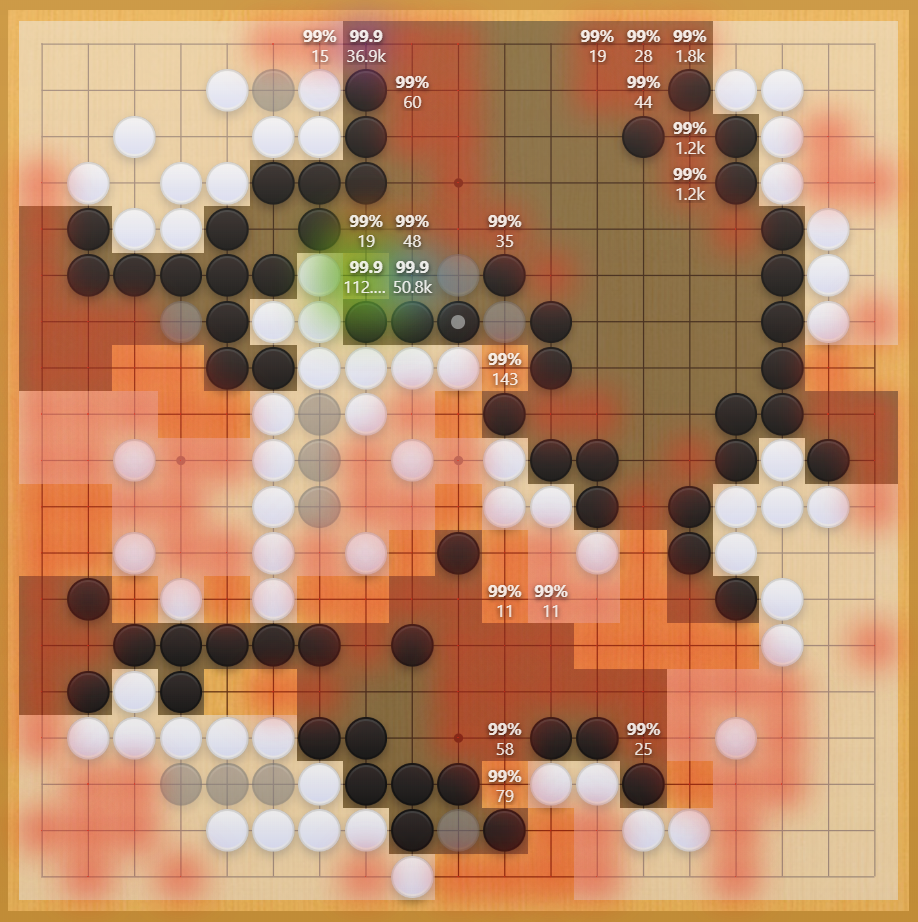
    A game analysed with KataGo
  8. 2019
    Lee Sedol announces his retirement, citing AlphaGo as "an entity that cannot be defeated".
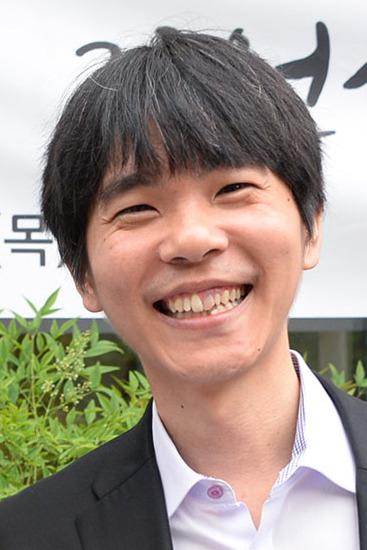
    Lee Sedol
  9. 2026
    Shin Jinseo defeats a new version of KataGo on a 2-stone handicap, coming back from a first-game defeat to win the next two.

Legends and first records

- Unknown – The "Rotten Handle" legend of the origin of the game: a carpenter in Zhejiang watches deities playing a mysterious game and loses track of time.
- c. 2356–2255 BCE – According to legend, Emperor Yao creates the game to teach discipline and balance to his son Danzhu. Another legend has Shun, his successor, invent it for his own son.
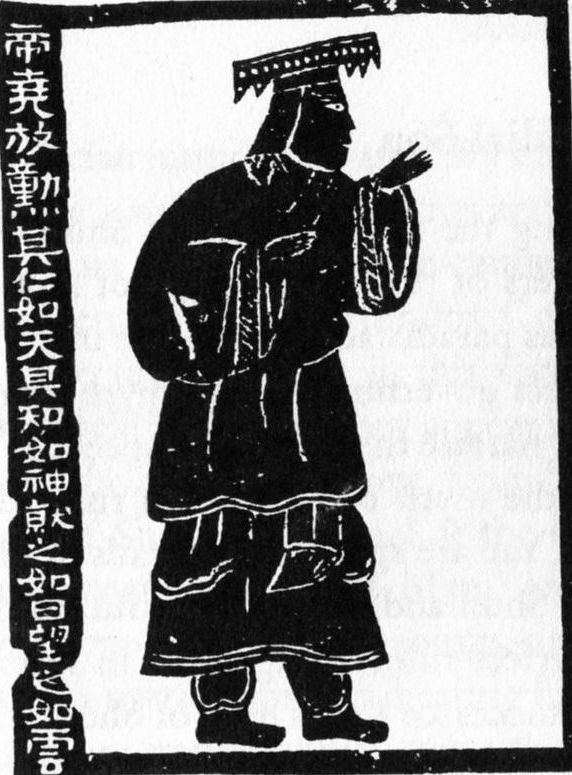
  Emperor Yao
- 548 BCE – The earliest written reference to the game is usually taken to be the historical annal Zuo Zhuan, about an event of this year; it is also mentioned in the Analects of Confucius (c. 551 – c. 479 BCE) and in the books of Mencius (c. 371 – c. 289 BCE).
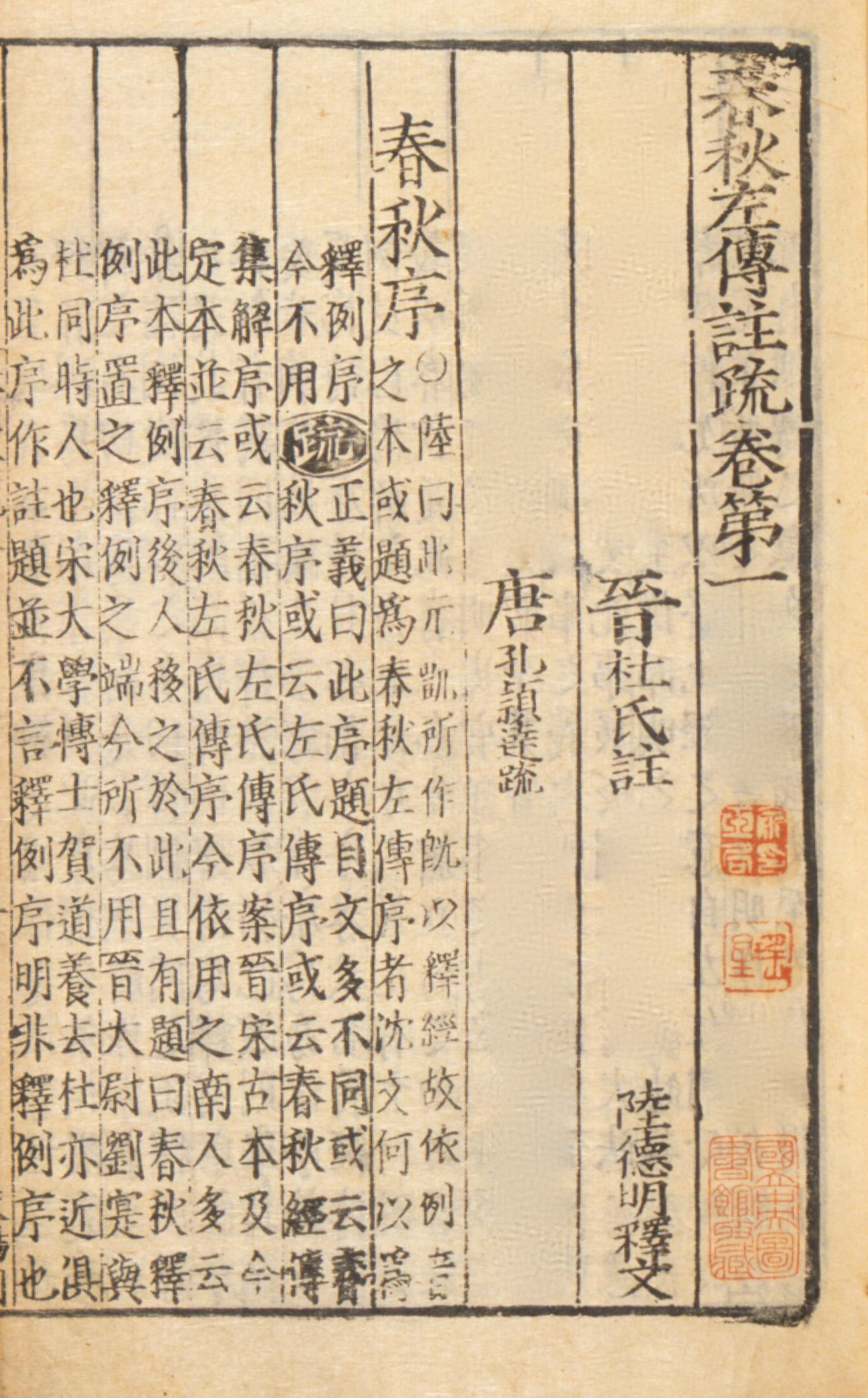
  First page of an edition of the Zuo Zhuan
- 3rd century BCE – Mencius mentions a famous player called Yi Qiu.
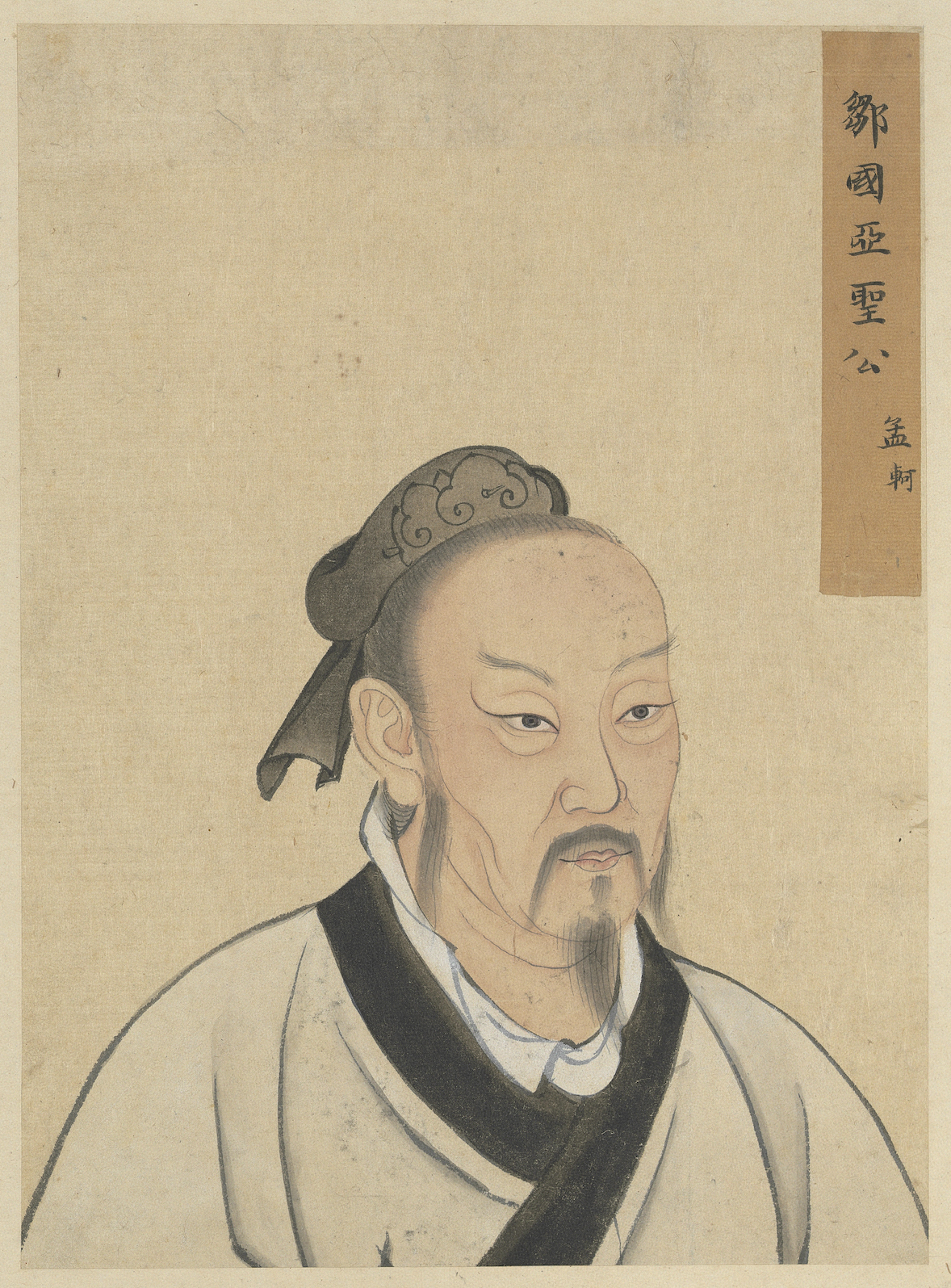
  Mencius
- 206 BCE – 24 CE – Western Han: a broken piece of a pottery board, the earliest board found in China, is later unearthed in Shaanxi.
- 1st–3rd century – Eastern Han: Ban Gu (32–92) writes Yì Zhǐ ("The Essentials of Go"), the oldest surviving text devoted to Go, and boards have 17 × 17 lines.
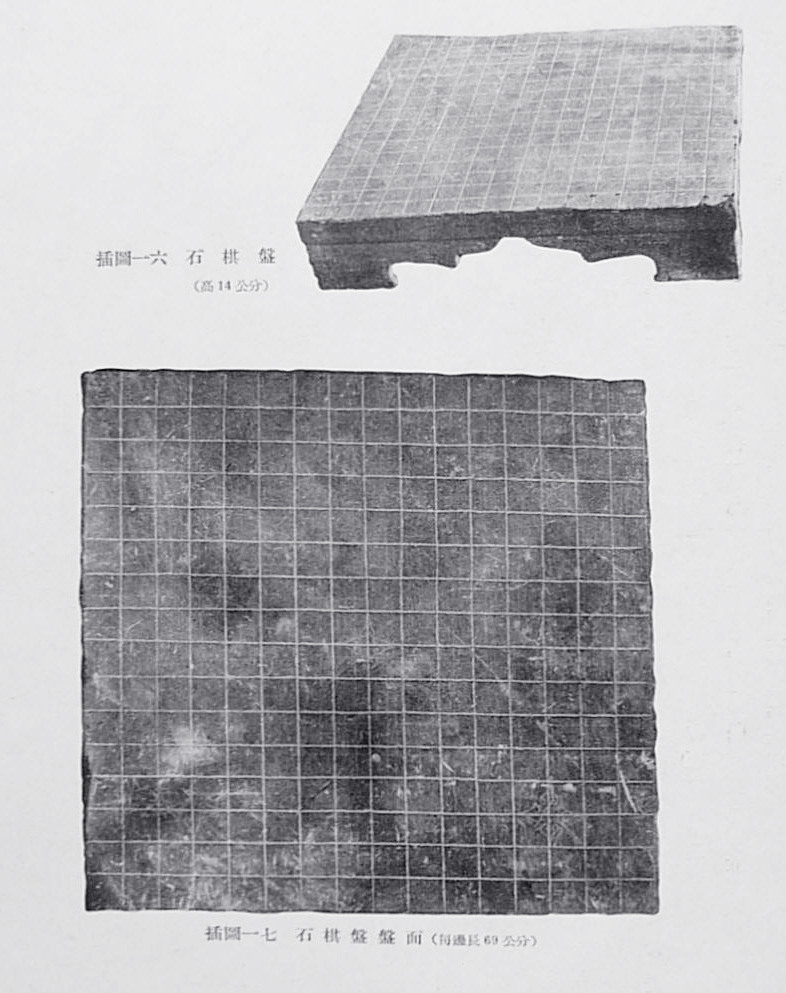
  A Han dynasty Go board
- c. 250 – The "Wu Diagrams" record the earliest known game of Go.

Ancient and medieval East Asia

- 3rd–6th century – The board grows from 17 × 17 to 19 × 19 lines. The Dunhuang Go Manual, the first book devoted to Go on the larger board, dates to this period.
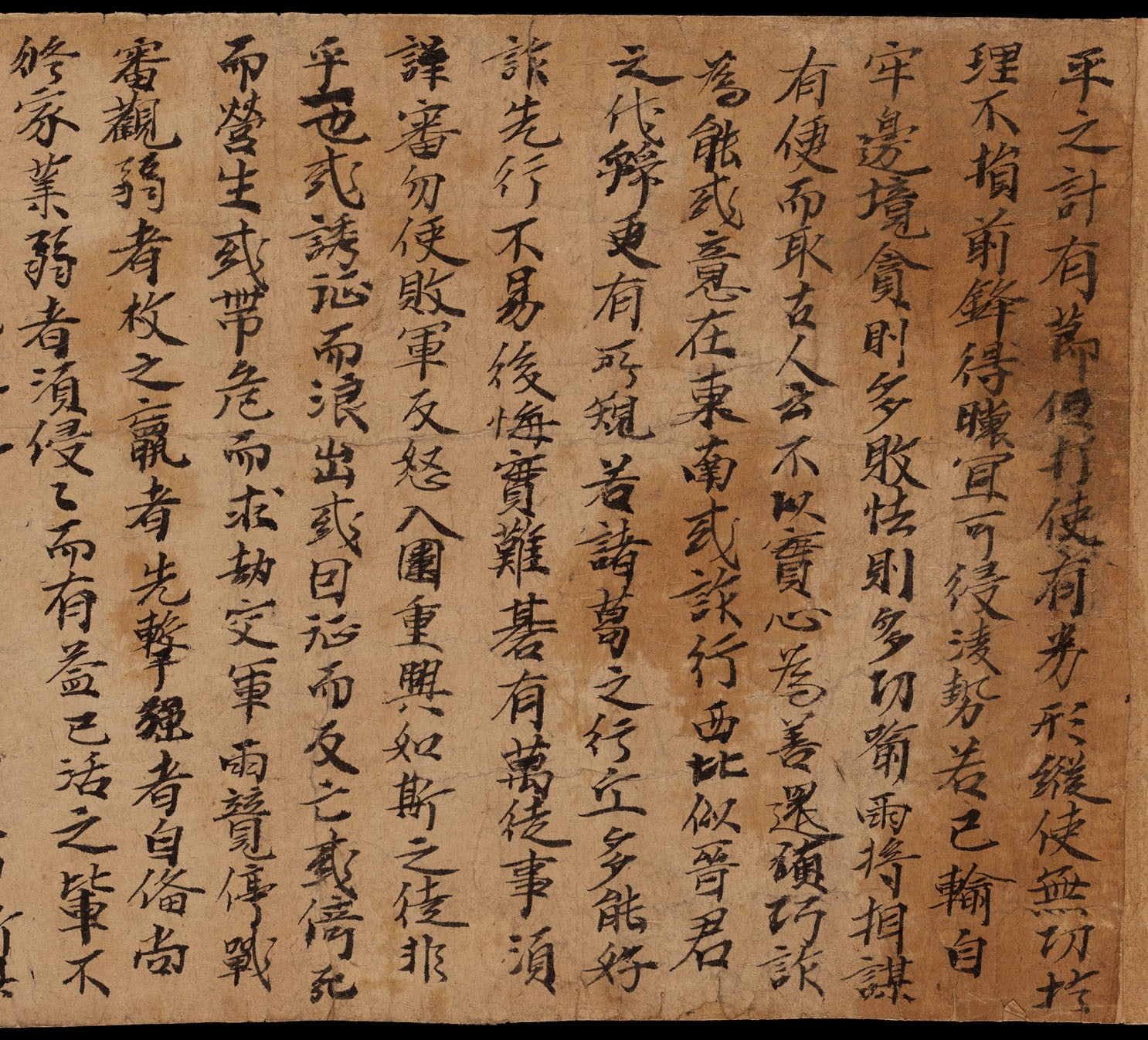
  The Dunhuang Go Manual, British Library
- 475 – In the rivalry between Goguryeo (37 BCE – 668) and Baekje (18 BCE – 660), the Goguryeo priest To-lim uses the game of Go to spy on King Yogyong; the invasion of Baekje follows.
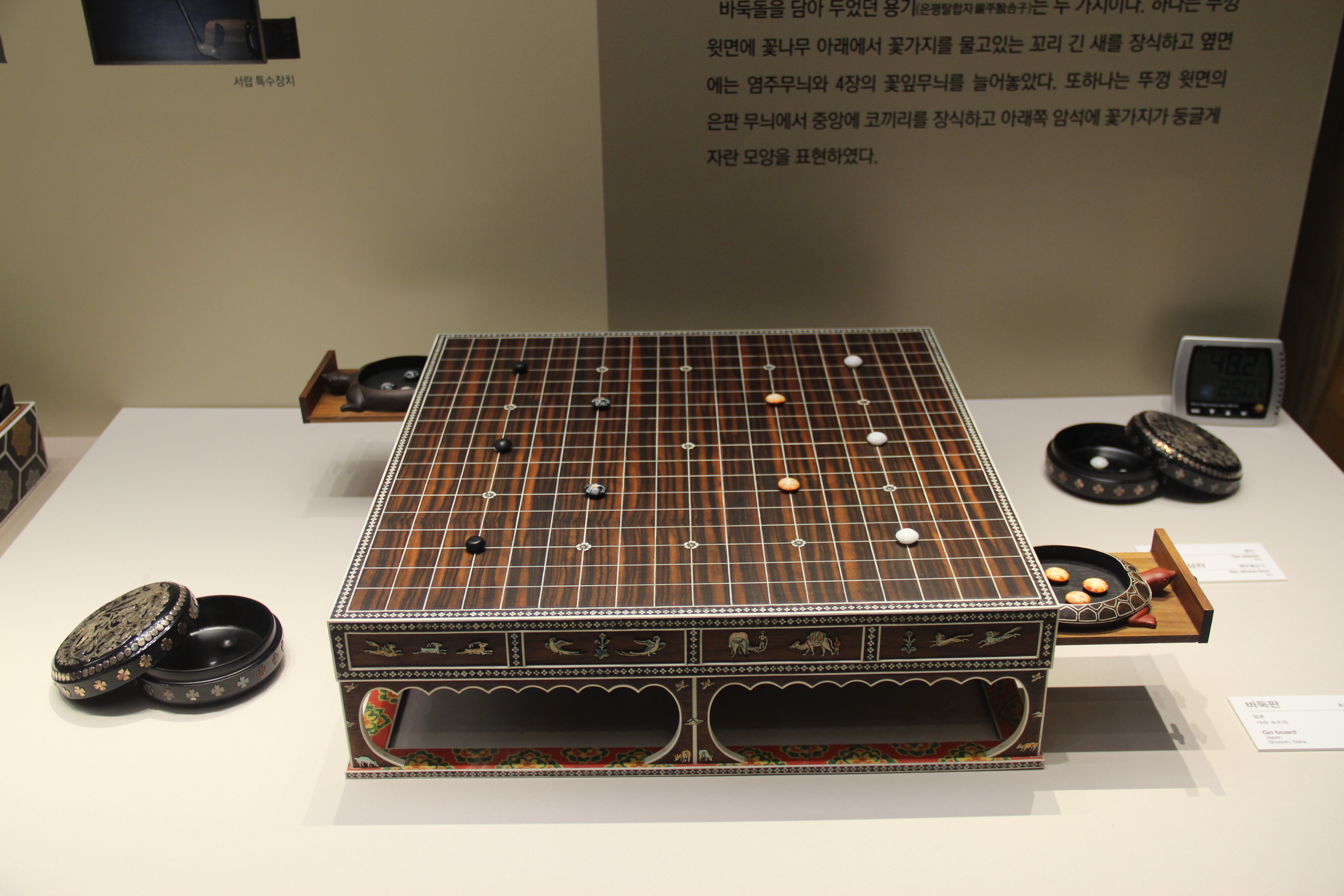
  A copy of a Baekje game of baduk
- Around 500 – Emperor Wu of Liang (464–549) promotes the game and holds the first documented national tournament; 278 players receive a rank.
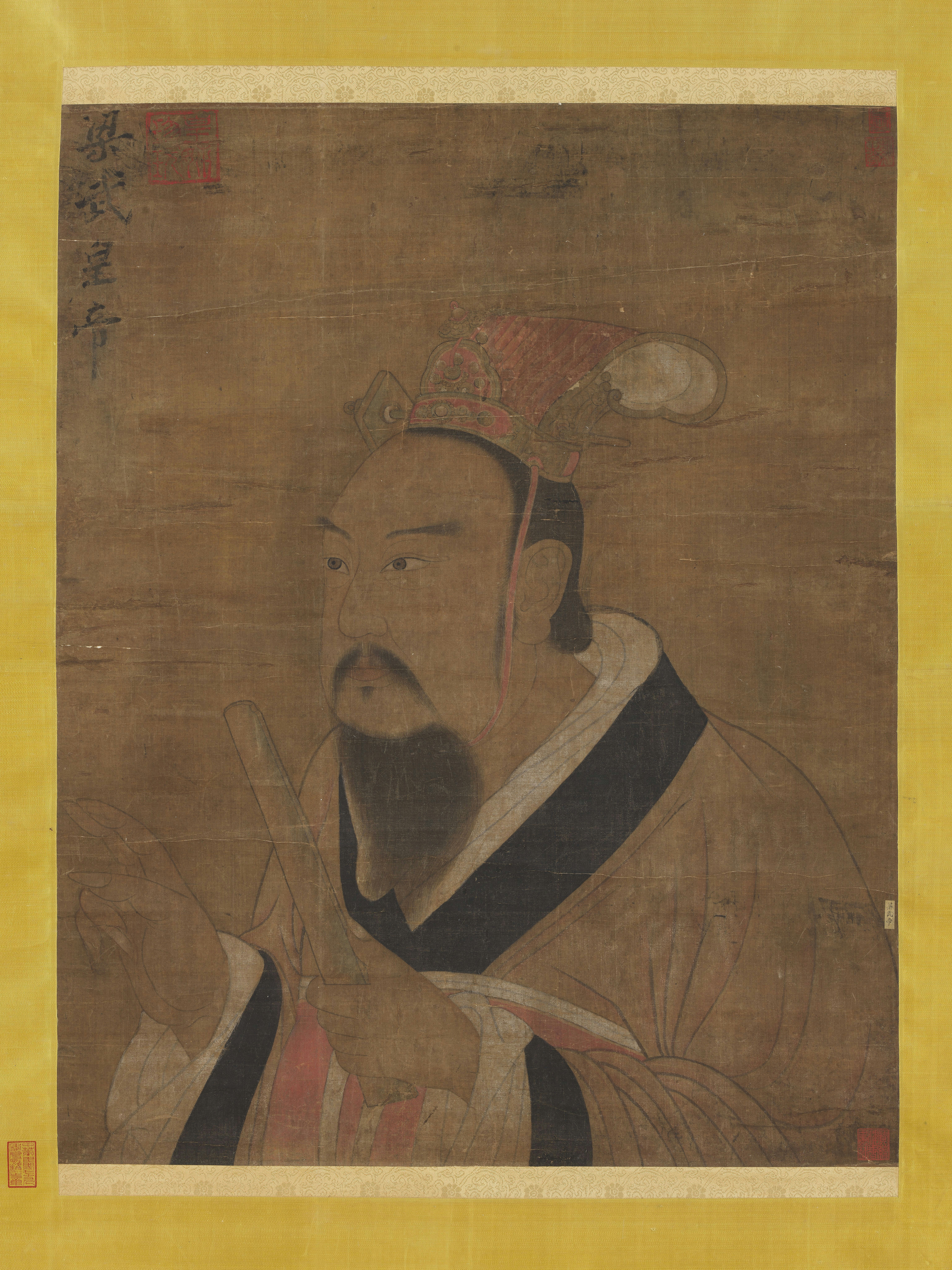
  Emperor Wu of Liang
- Early 7th century – Chinese chronicles (the Records of the Sui) report that the Japanese enjoy Go.
- 618–907 – Tang dynasty: the court creates the post of Go attendant ("Qídàizhào") for players who play against the emperor, and players are ranked. Wang Jixin is credited with the "Ten Golden Rules of Go".
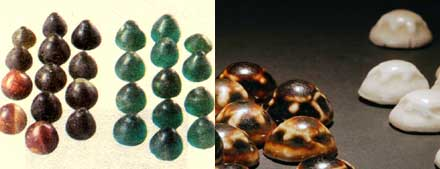
  Early Go stones
- Early 8th century – The game reaches Tibet and Mongolia, where the 17 × 17 board survives.
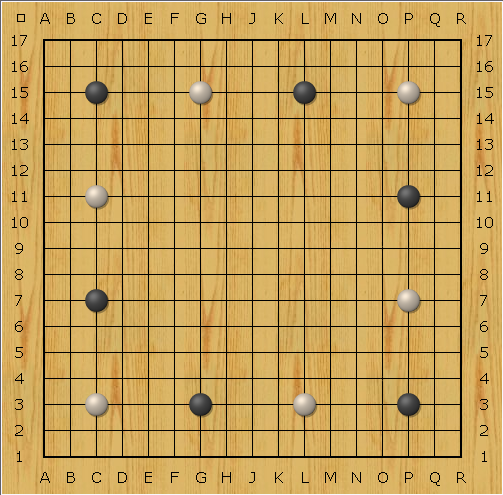
  A Tibetan Go board
- 8th century – Go reaches Japan, traditionally brought back from the Tang court by Kibi no Makibi (695–775); the Taihō Code of 701 already describes it.
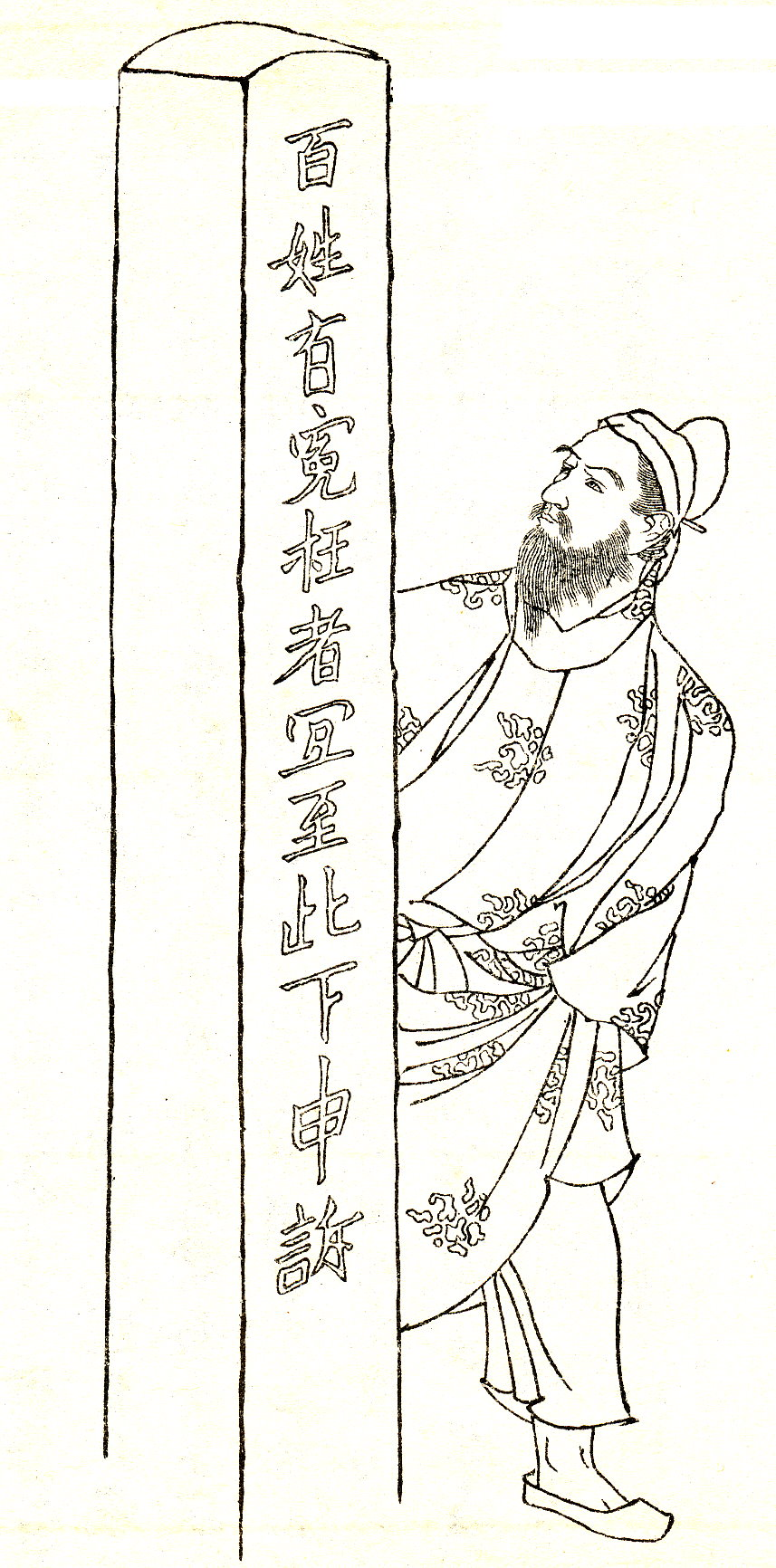
  Kibi no Makibi
- 737 – The Chinese player Yang Jiying travels to Korea as an envoy and no player of Silla (57 BCE – 935) can match him.
- c. 1050 – Song dynasty (960–1279): a major treatise in thirteen chapters, the Classic of Go (Qíjīng Shísān Piān), is written; the Song era also produces many other treatises on strategy.
- c. 1100 – The Wangyou Qingle Ji, compiled by Li Yimin, is the oldest surviving Go book. It collects essays, old game records and the first set of tsumego problems, among them a game between a Japanese prince and Gu Shiyan, the first recorded double-ladder breaker.
- 1349 – Yuan dynasty (1271–1368): Yan Defu and Yan Tianzhang compile the Xuanxuan Qijing ("Gateway to All Marvels"), six volumes with 376 problems, essays and game records; it inspires problem books around the world.
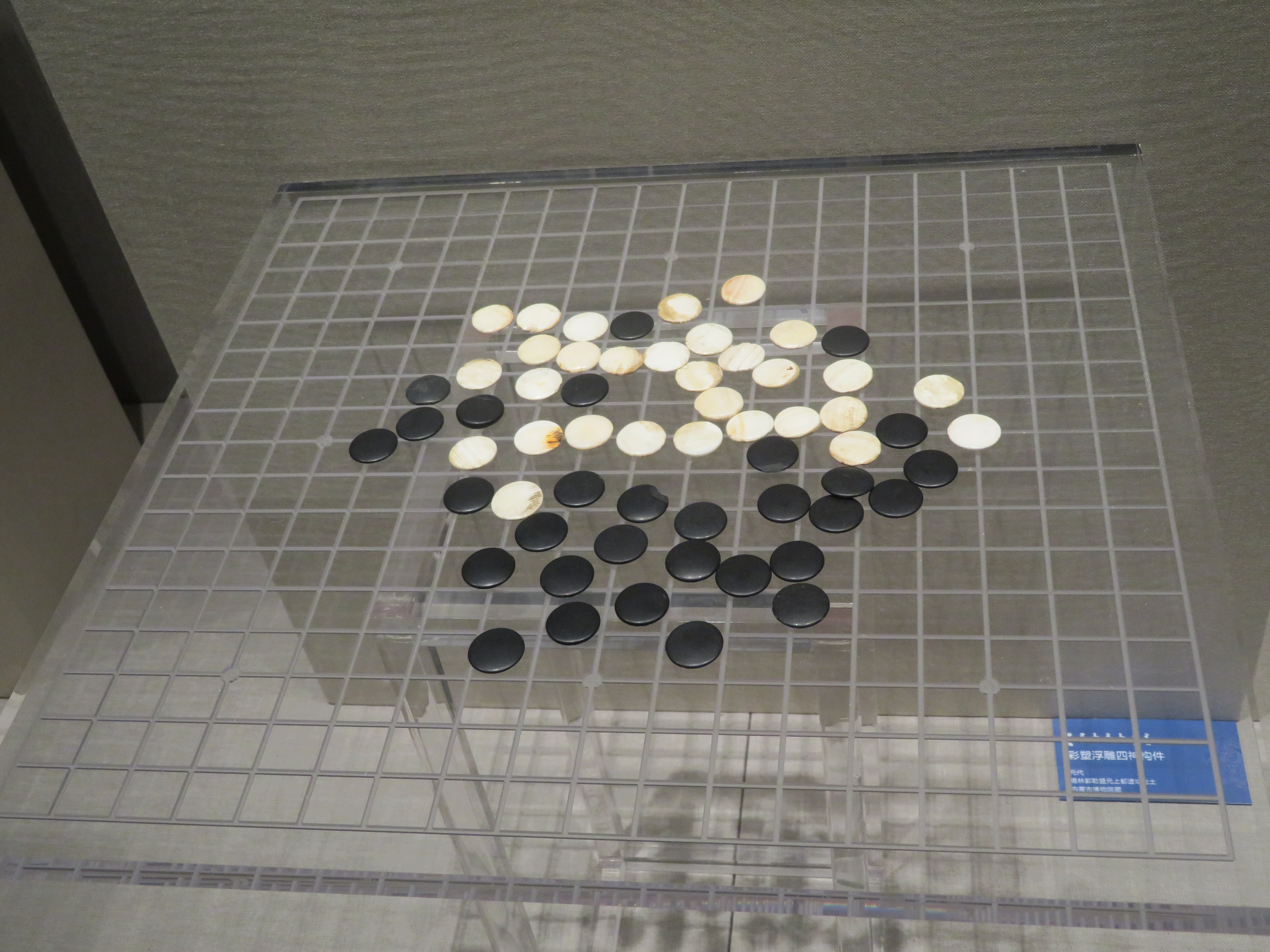
  Weiqi stones, Inner Mongolia Museum
- Ming dynasty – Chinese scoring changes from territory to stone scoring. The Hongwu Emperor (1328–1398) issues an "Edict Banning Weiqi" in the face of widespread gambling on the game.
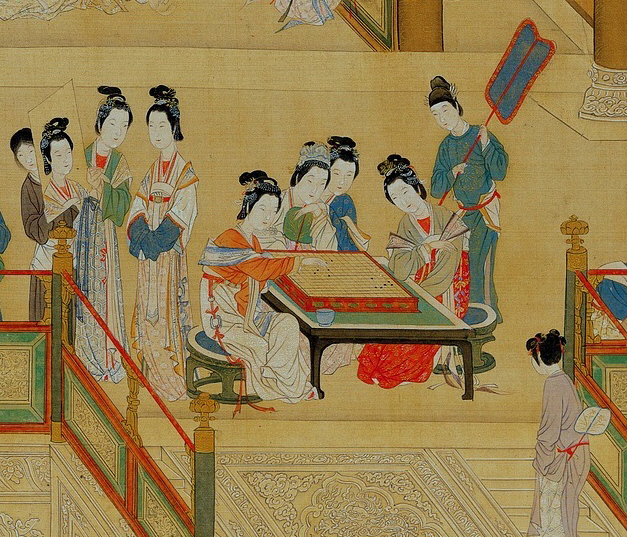
  Go at the Ming court
- 1582 – Honinbo Sansa (1559–1623) plays a triple ko against Kashio Rigen (1565–?) at a monastery in Kyoto in the presence of Oda Nobunaga (1534–1582); the game is suspended. The next day Nobunaga is killed, and a triple ko is considered bad luck ever after.
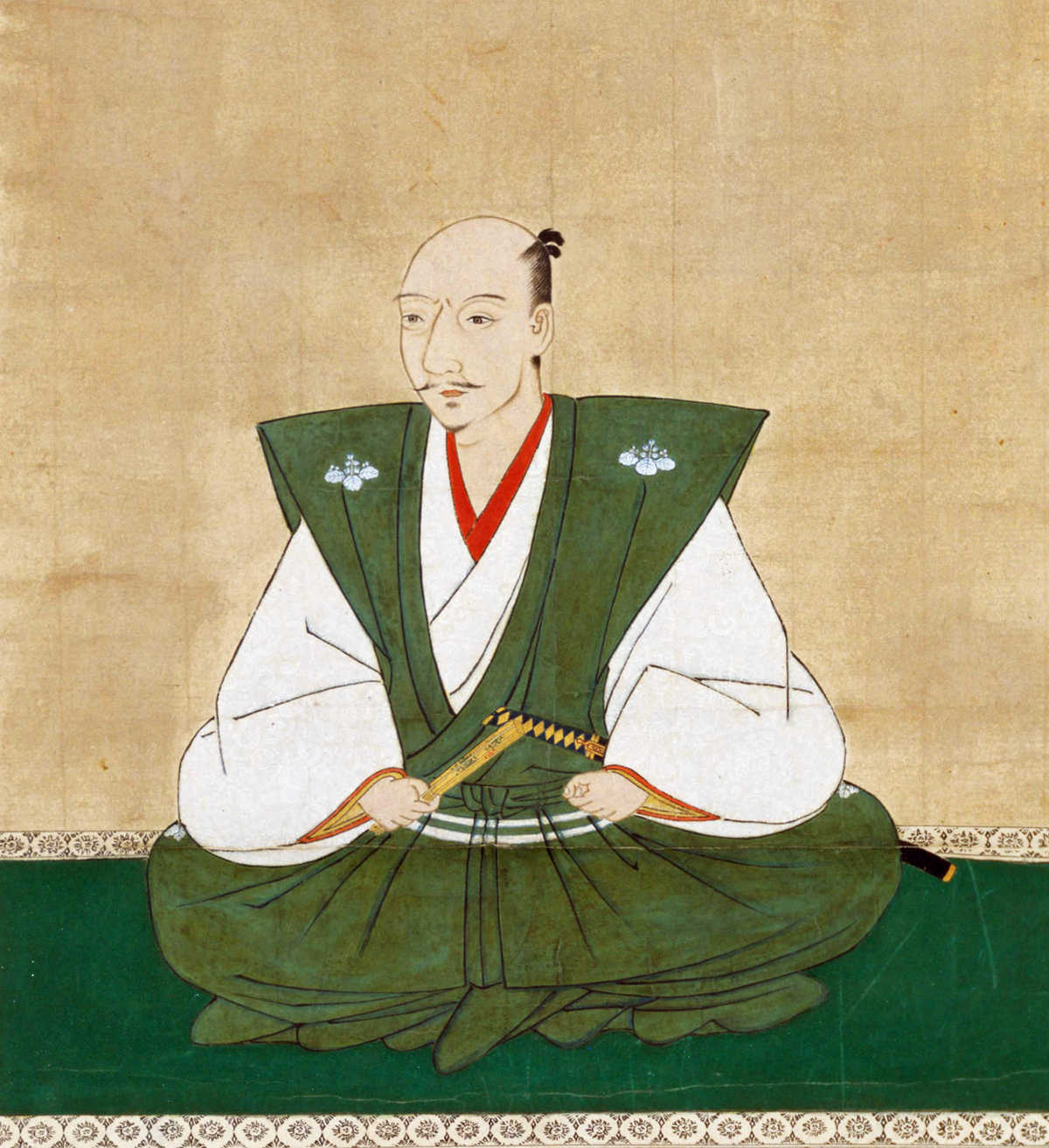
  Oda Nobunaga
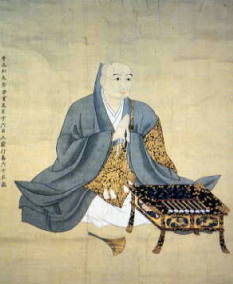
  Hon'inbō Sansa
- 1588 – Toyotomi Hideyoshi (1537–1598) organizes the first Japanese Go tournament; Hon'inbō (Sansa) wins and is granted a salary.
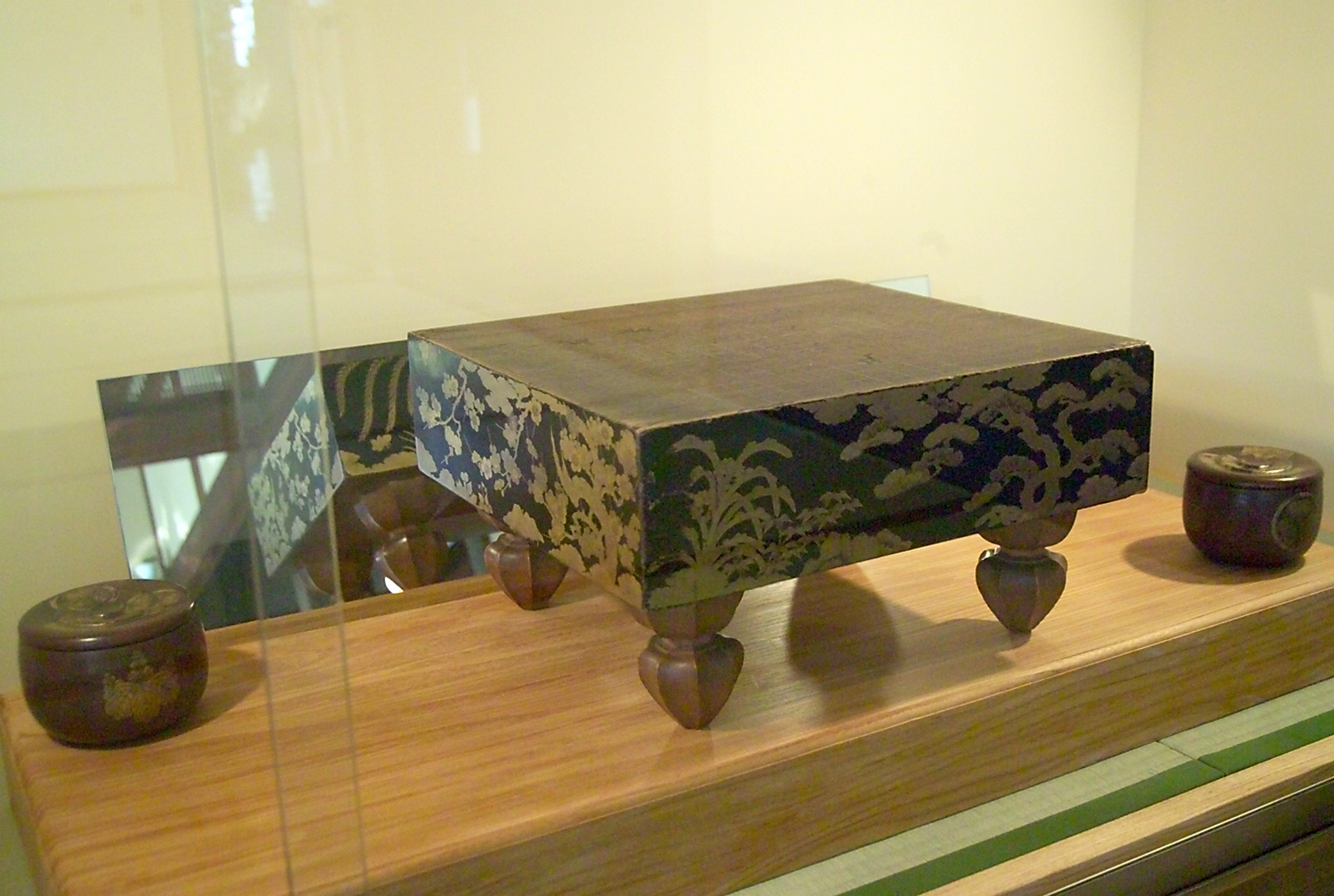
  The Go board of Hideyoshi and Ieyasu, Ryōgen-in
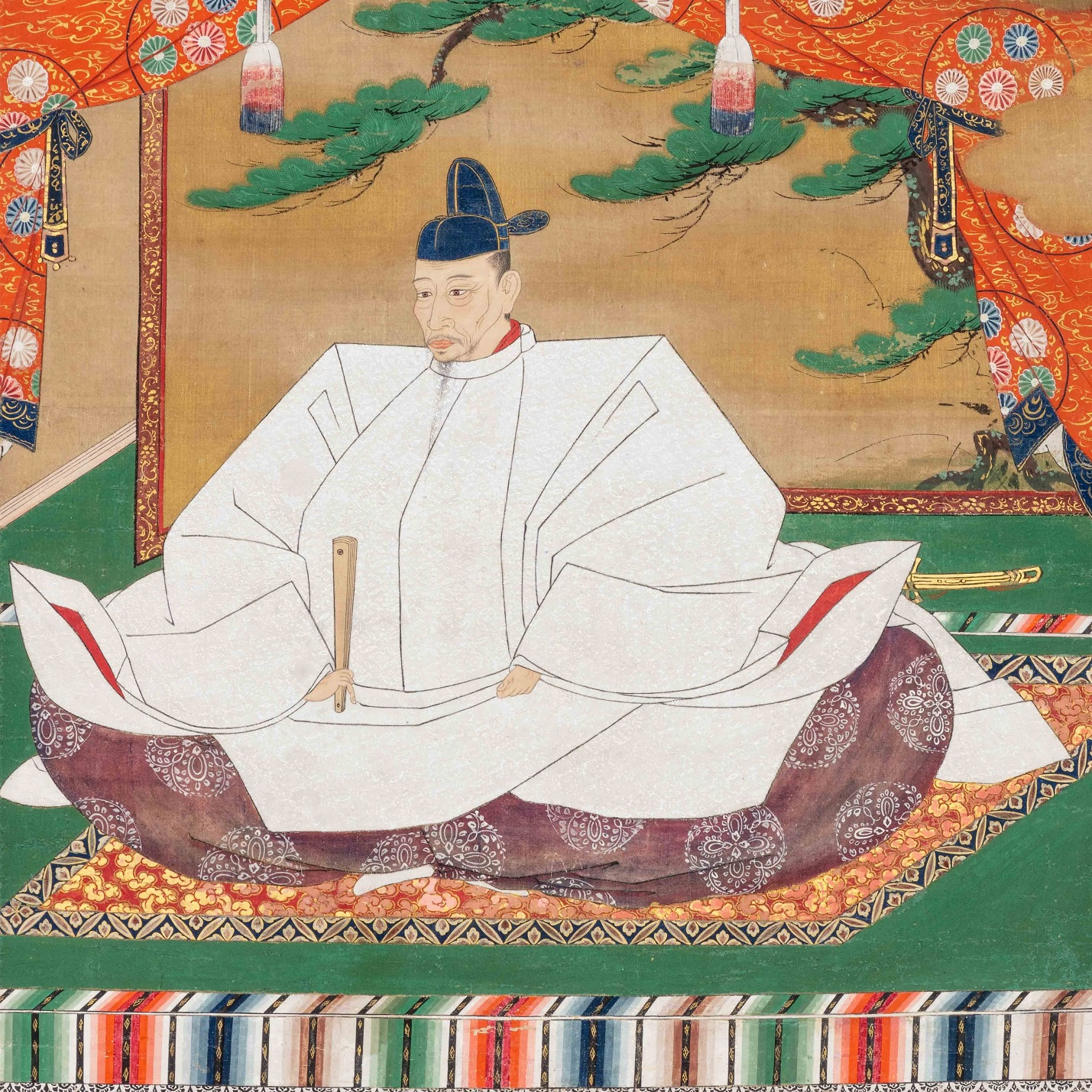
  Toyotomi Hideyoshi

Edo-period Japan and Qing China

- 1603 – Honinbo Sansa (1559–1623) is appointed by Shogun Tokugawa Ieyasu (1543–1616) as head of the Go world (Meijin Godokoro): the major Japanese Go school system begins.
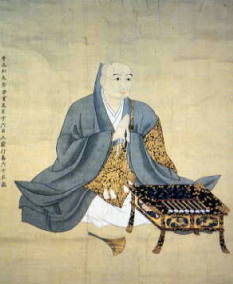
  Hon'inbō Sansa
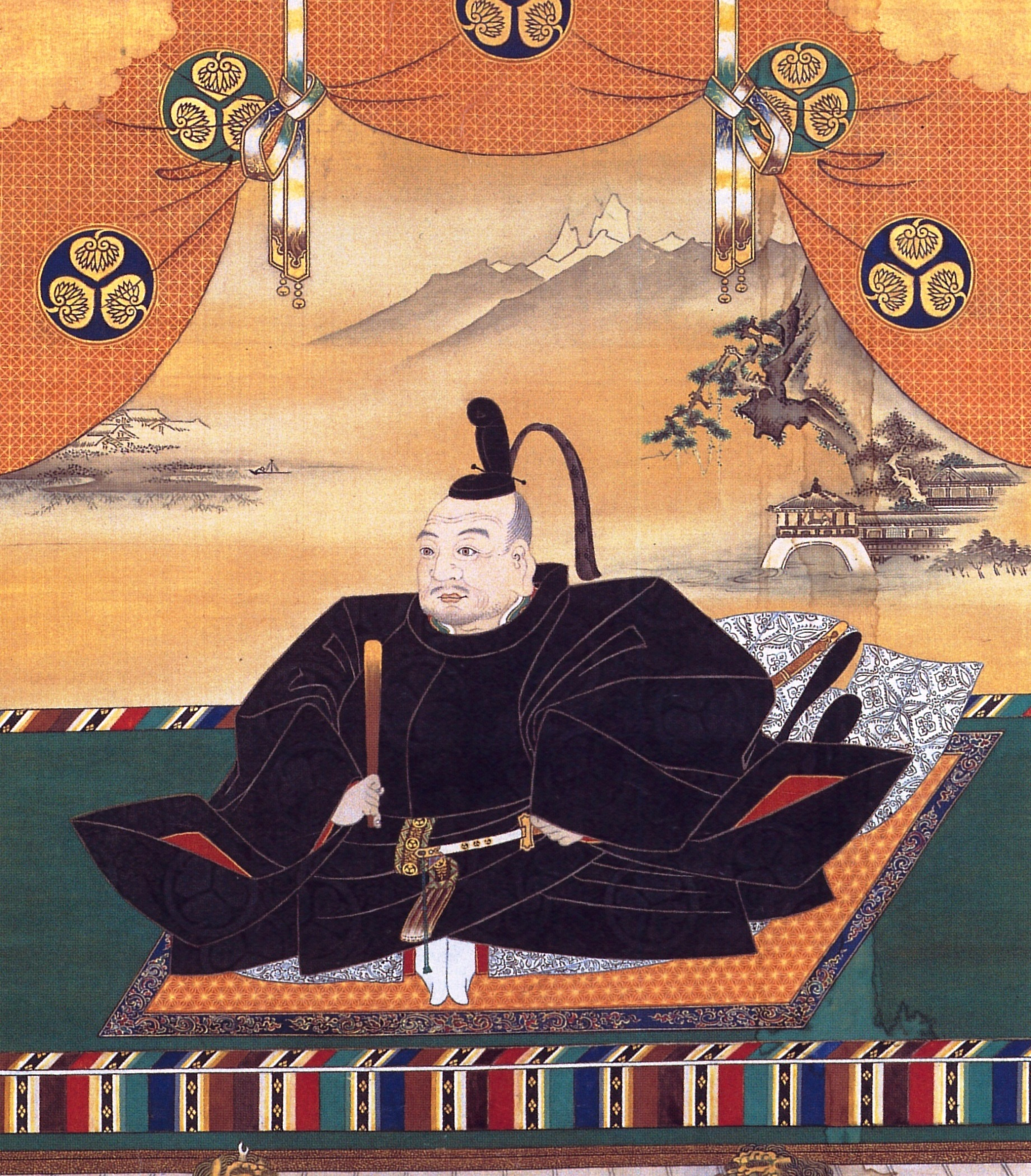
  Tokugawa Ieyasu
- 1612 – The Tokugawa shogunate (1603–1868) establishes four hereditary Go houses (Hon'inbō, Inoue, Yasui and Hayashi) and pays them stipends; they compete for 250–300 years.
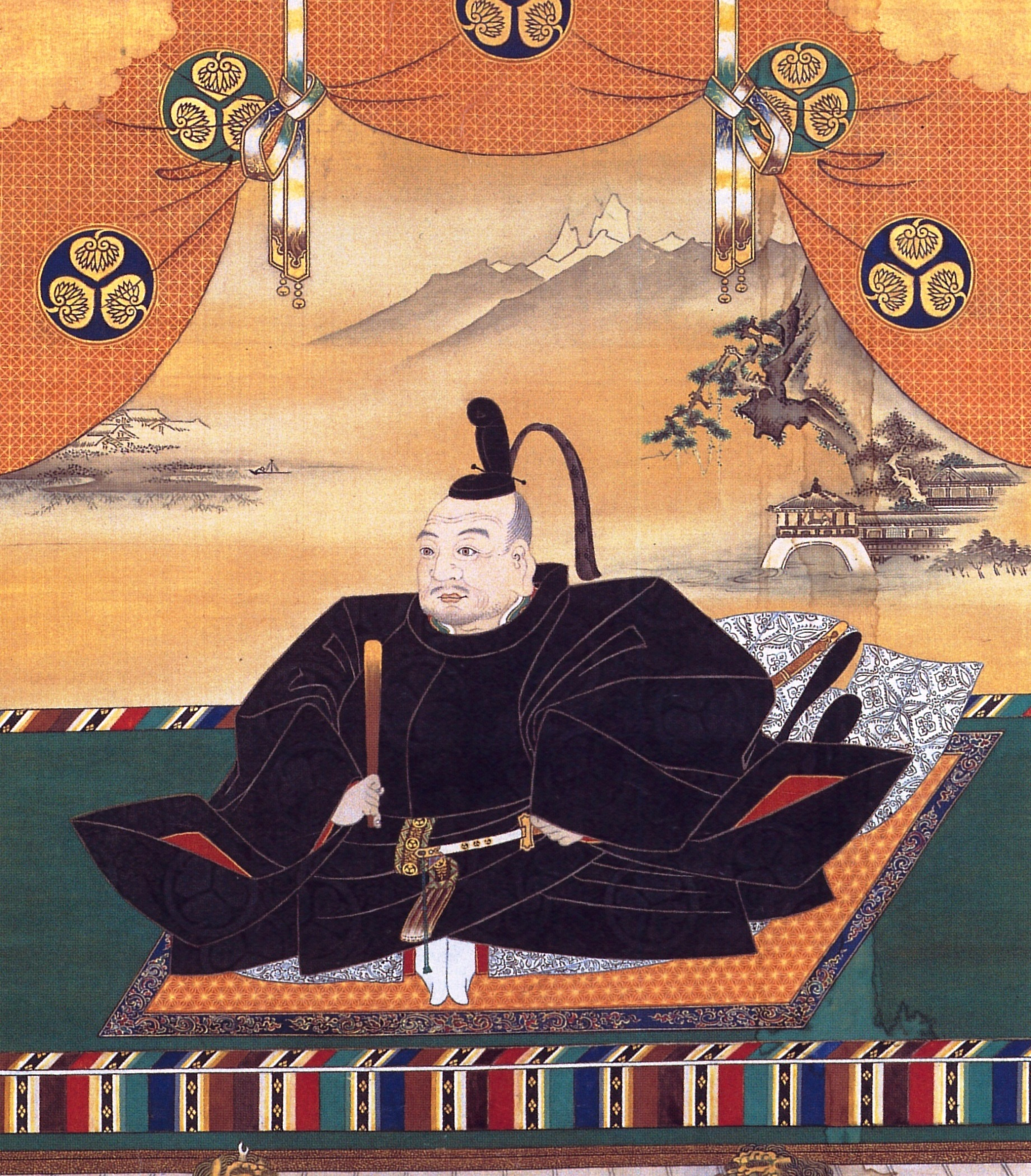
  Tokugawa Ieyasu, founder of the Tokugawa shogunate
- 1615 – Nicolas Trigault (1577–1628) publishes in Augsburg the diaries of the Jesuit Matteo Ricci (1552–1610), which explain the game of weiqi; the book goes through at least 16 editions in European languages.
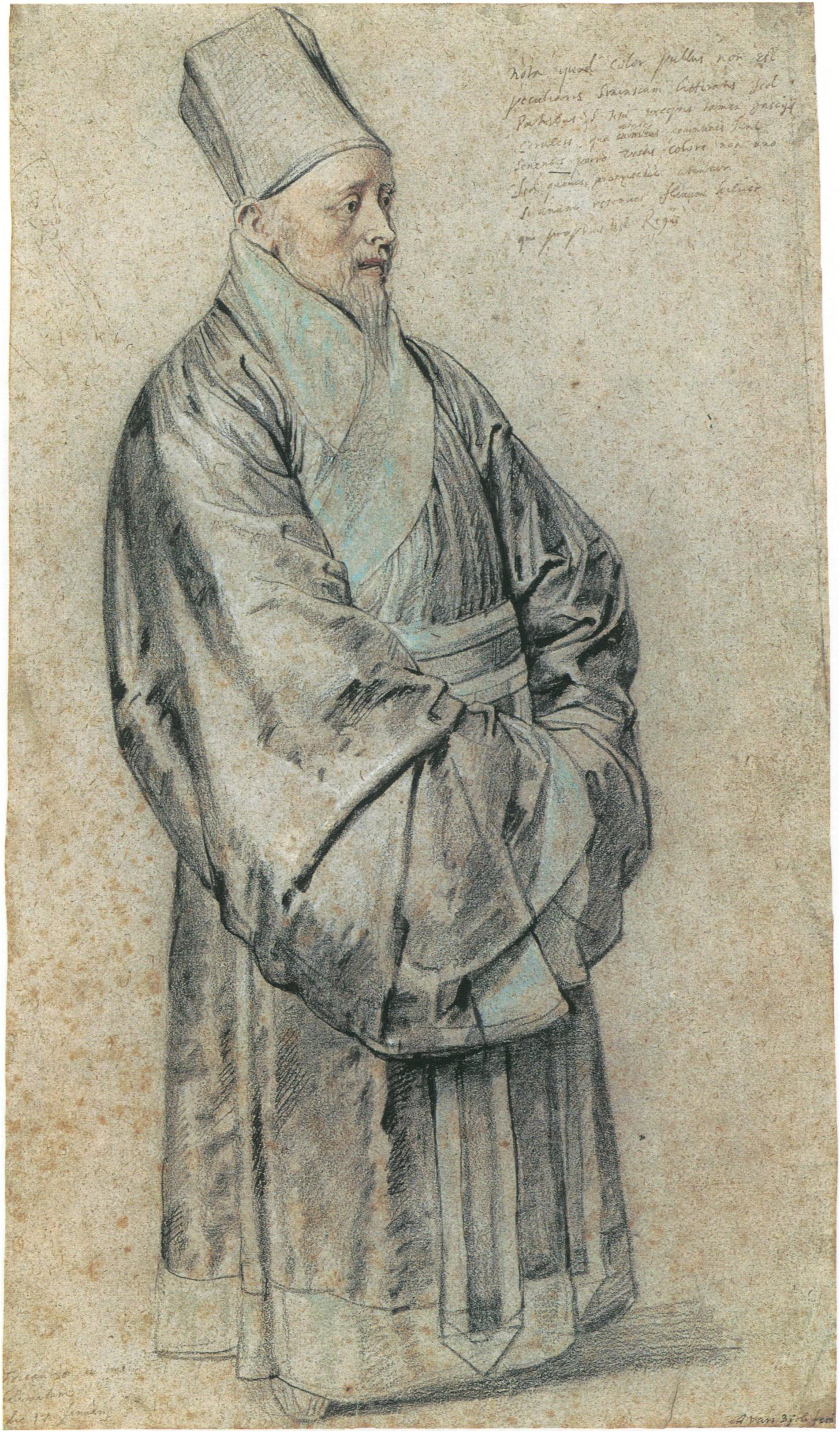
  Nicolas Trigault, by Rubens
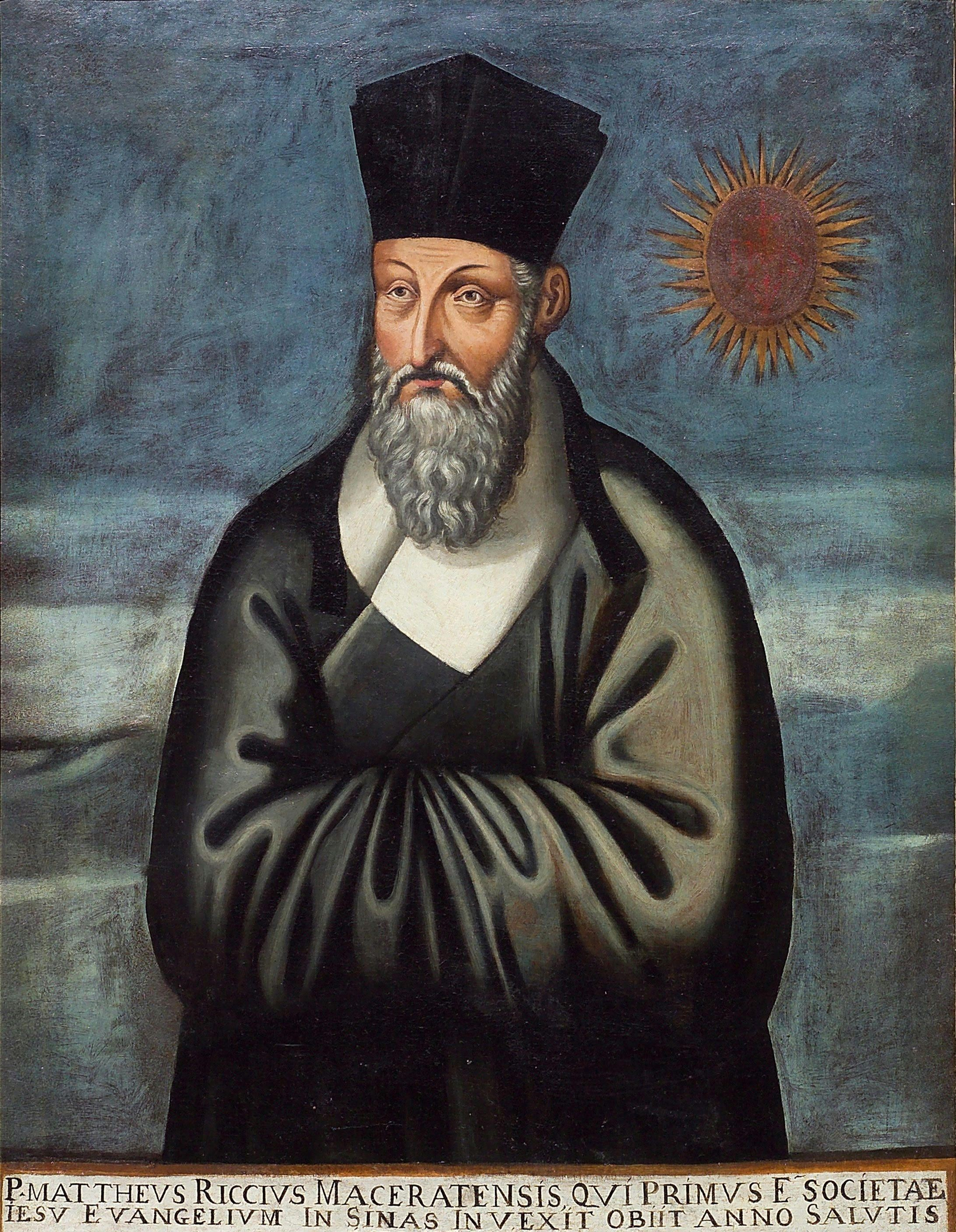
  Matteo Ricci
- 1626–1628 – The first castle game, played before the shogun, takes place in 1626; in 1628 the castle games become an official yearly ceremony.
- 1645–1653 – The first official challenge match (sōgo) to decide the Meijin, between Hon'inbō Sanetsu (1611–1658) and Yasui Sanchi (1617–1703).
- c. 1650 – Huang Longshi, probably the strongest Chinese player of the Qing dynasty (1644–1912), is born (c. 1650 – c. 1694).
- 17th–18th century – The philosopher Leibniz (1646–1716) publishes an article on Go with a picture of a game, saying he does not know all the rules.
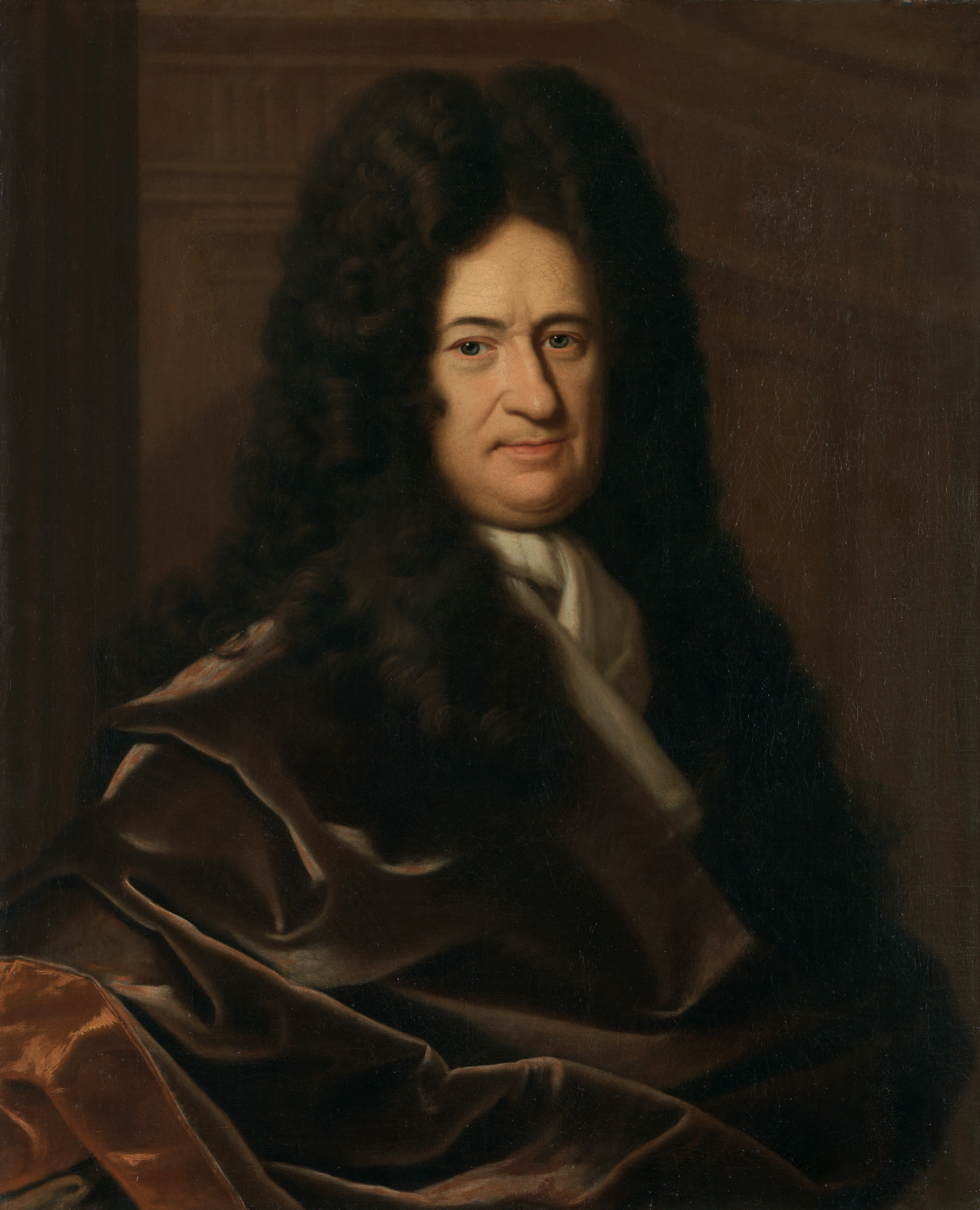
  Gottfried Wilhelm Leibniz
- Late 17th century – The fourth Hon'inbō, Dōsaku (1645–1702), defeats every top player of his time and is praised as having "thirteen-dan strength".
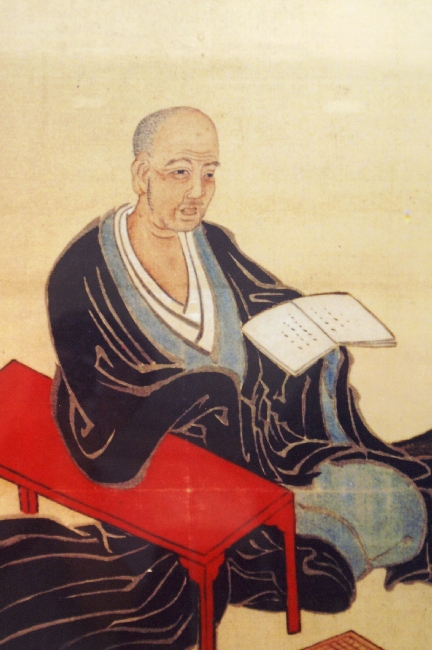
  Hon'inbō Dōsaku
- 1694 – Thomas Hyde (1636–1703) writes the first detailed description of Go in a European language, in his treatise on oriental board games.
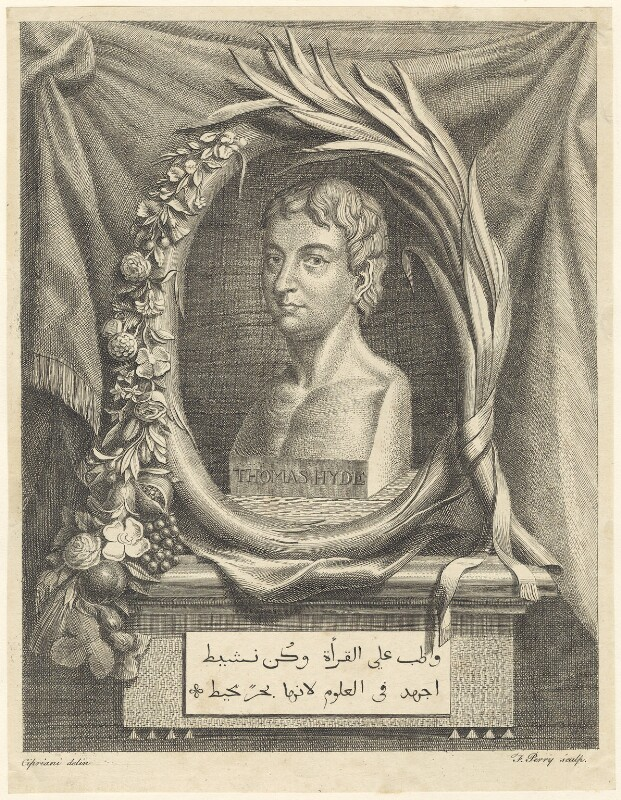
  Thomas Hyde
- 1713 – The Igo Hatsuyoron, a collection of very hard problems, is created.
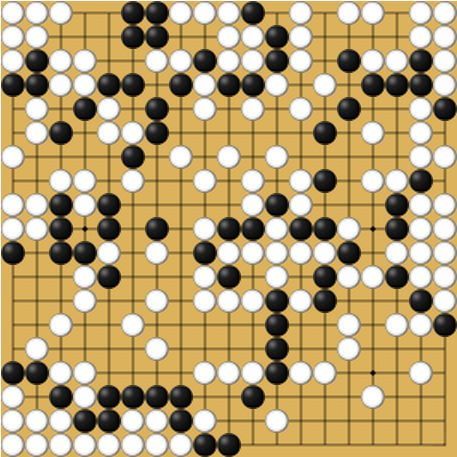
  Problem 76 of the Igo Hatsuyoron
- 1739 – Shi Xiangxia and Fan Xiping play the "Ten Games at Danghu" in Pinghu, Zhejiang.
- 1840 – The "blood-vomiting game": Hon'inbō Jōwa (1787–1847) beats Akaboshi Intetsu (1810–1835) in a week-long match; Akaboshi collapses from exhaustion and dies soon after.
- 1846 – The "ear-reddening game": Honinbo Shusaku (1829–1862)'s move 127 stuns Gennan Inseki (1798–1859), and becomes one of the best moves of all time.
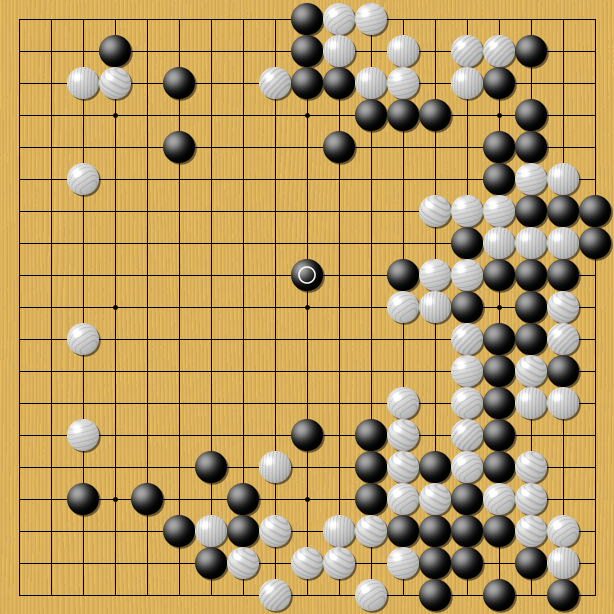
  The "ear-reddening" game
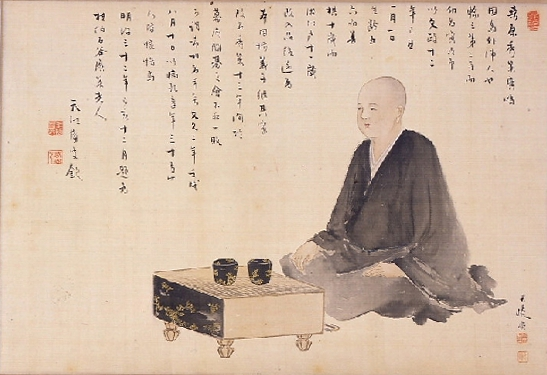
  Hon'inbō Shūsaku
- 1863 – The last castle games are played as the crisis of the shogunate disrupts the ceremonies.

Modern professional Go

- 1868 – The Meiji Restoration (1866–1869) ends the official stipends of the Go houses; Go loses its patrons and the masters struggle.
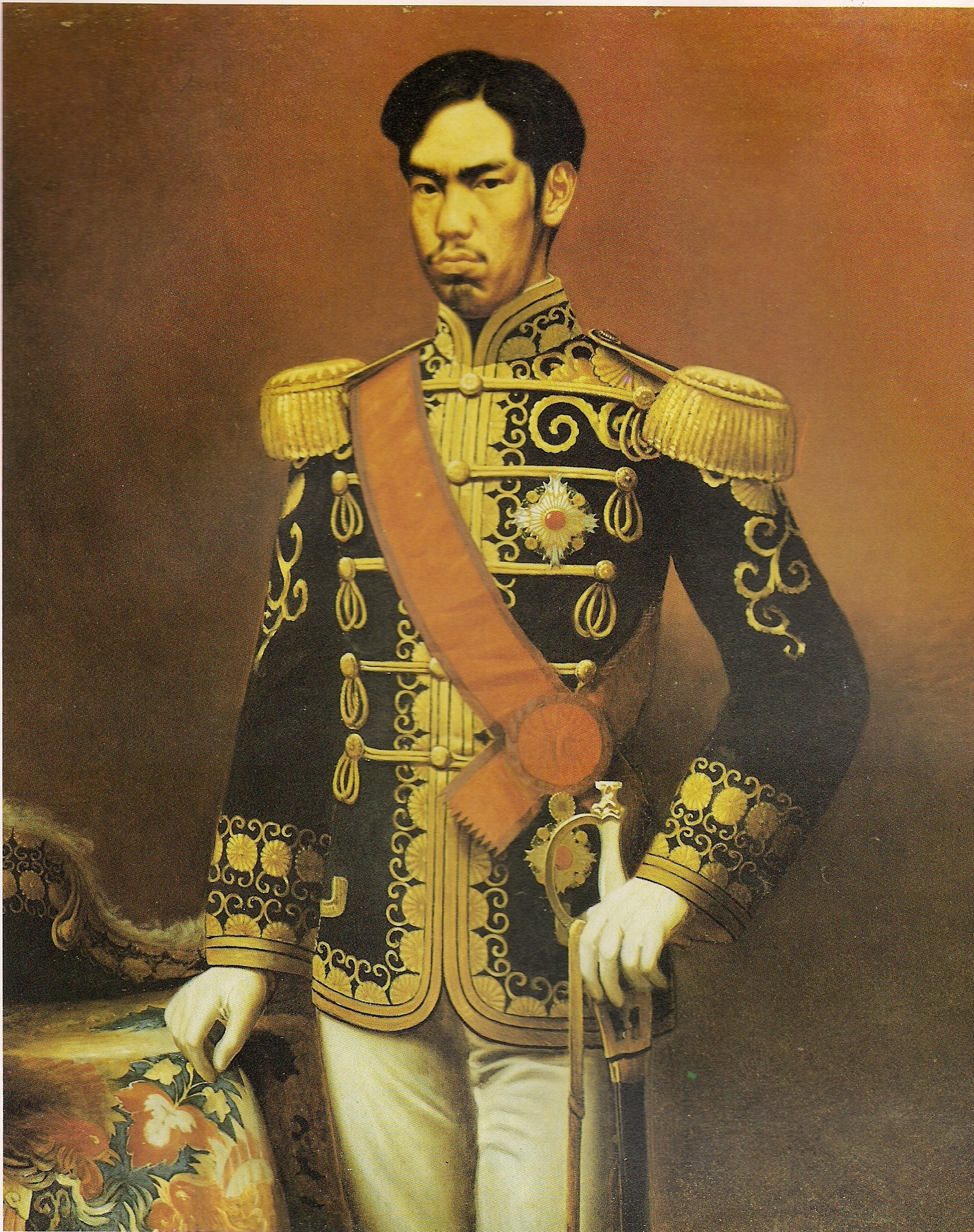
  Emperor Meiji
- 1872 – The first recorded game of Go in Europe is played between Kido Takayoshi (1833–1877) and Ōkubo Toshimichi (1830–1878) of the Iwakura Mission (1871–1873).
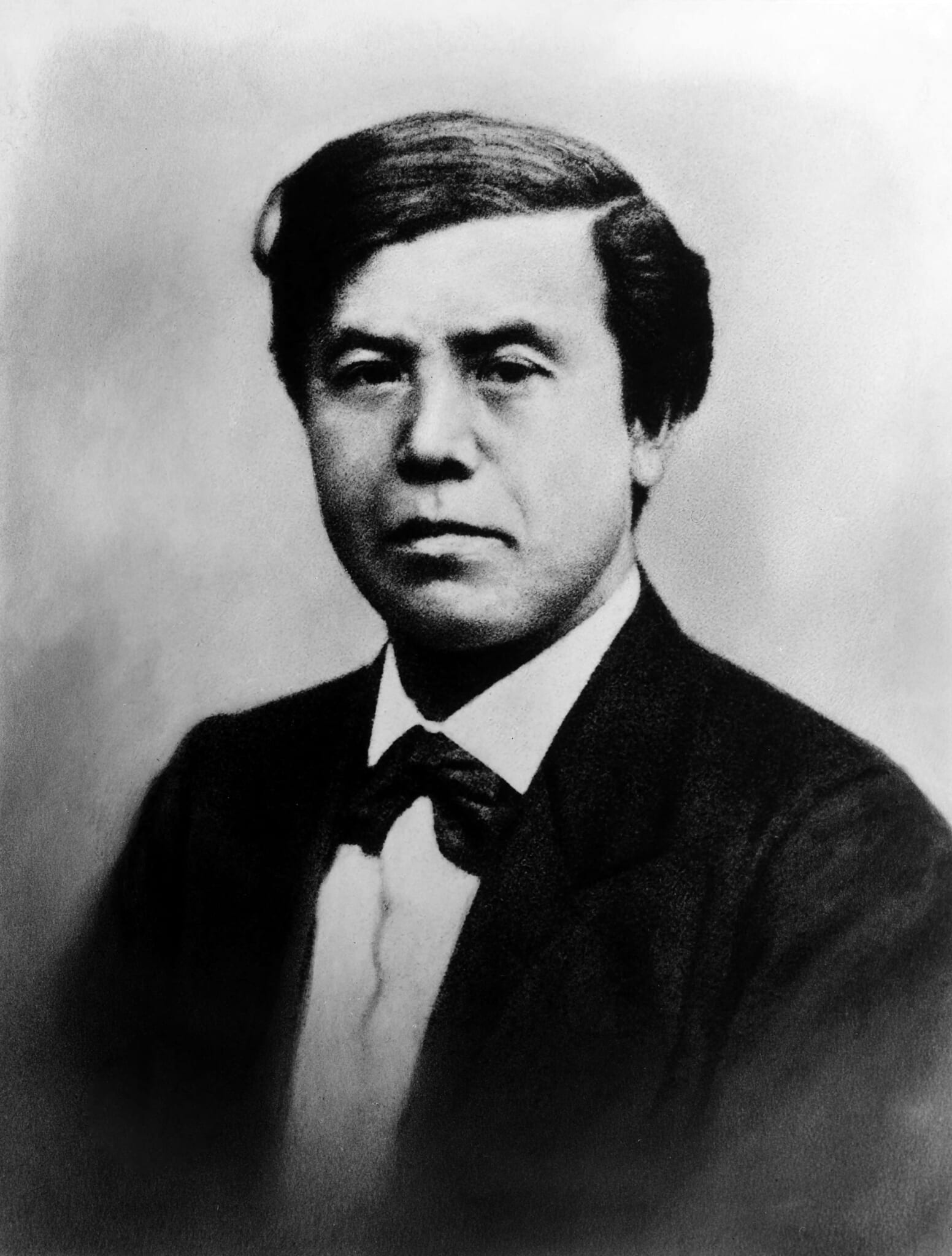
  Kido Takayoshi
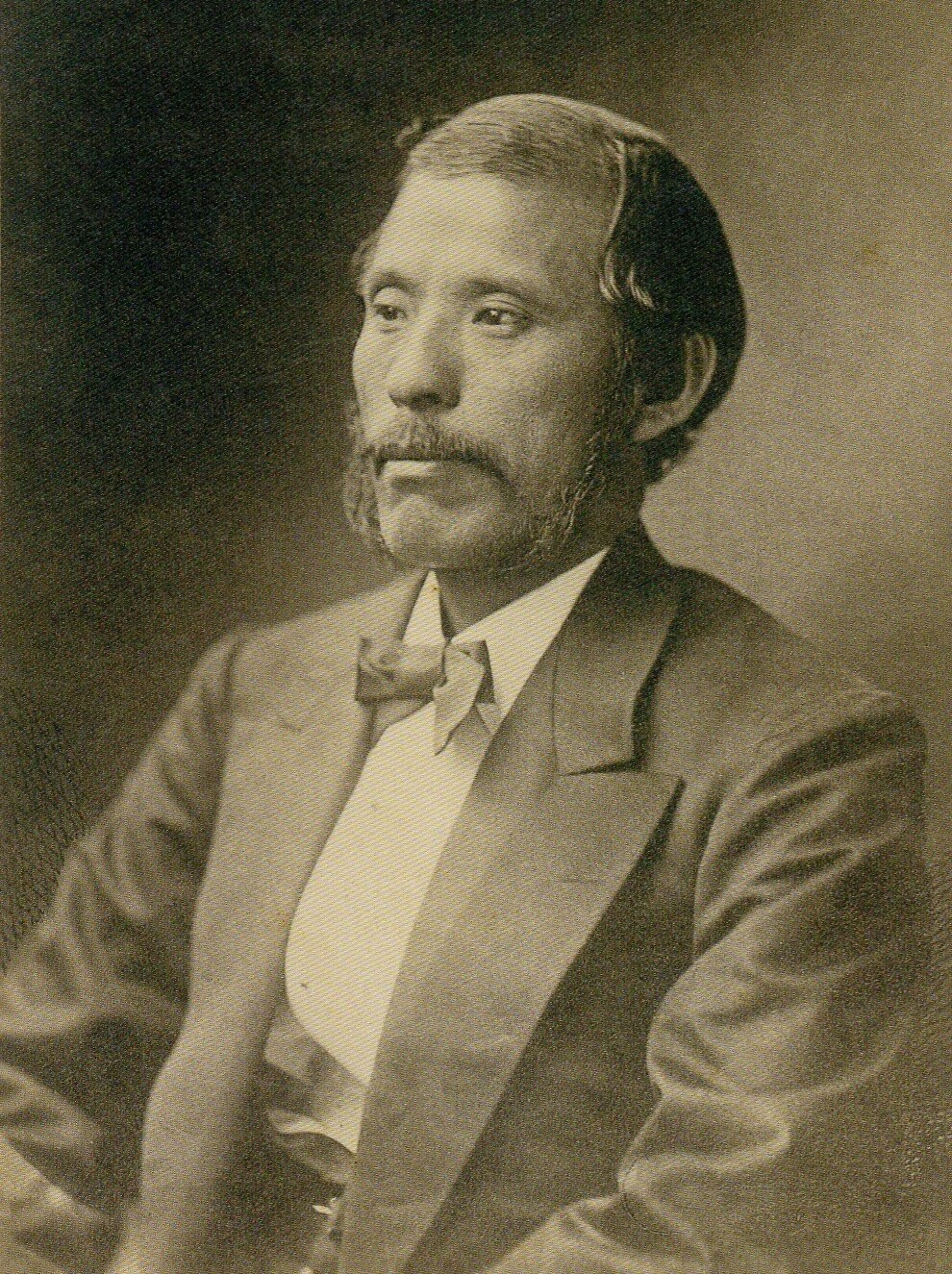
  Ōkubo Toshimichi
  Members of the Iwakura Mission
- 1878 – The first newspaper Go column appears in Japan, on 1 April. In 1879 the Hoensha society forms; its journal Igo Shinpo is the first Go magazine.
- 1880 – Oskar Korschelt (1853–1940), who learned the game in Japan from Murase Shūho, publishes Das Go Spiel: the first systematic description in a Western language.
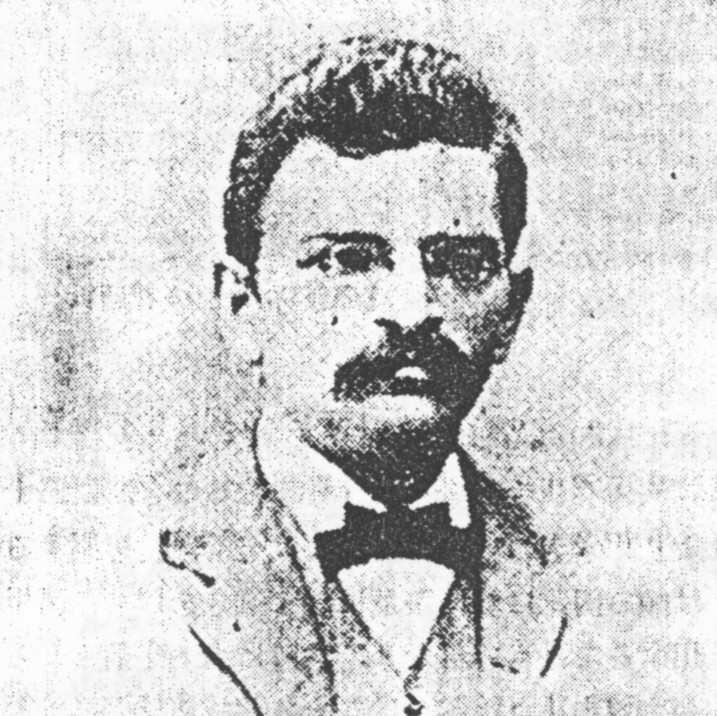
  Oskar Korschelt
- 1905–1908 – Edward Lasker (1885–1981) learns Go in Berlin (1905) and later founds the New York Go Club; in 1908 Arthur Smith publishes the first Go book in English, The Game of Go.
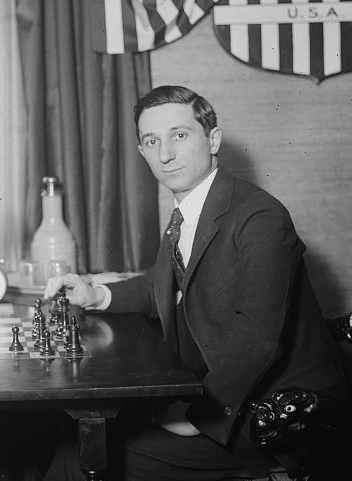
  Edward Lasker
- 1909–1910 – The Japanese professional Takabe Dōhei (1881–1951) visits China and introduces play without fixed starting stones.
- 1924 – The Nihon Ki-in, Japan's professional Go association, is founded, ending the hereditary house system and inaugurating the modern rank and tournament system.
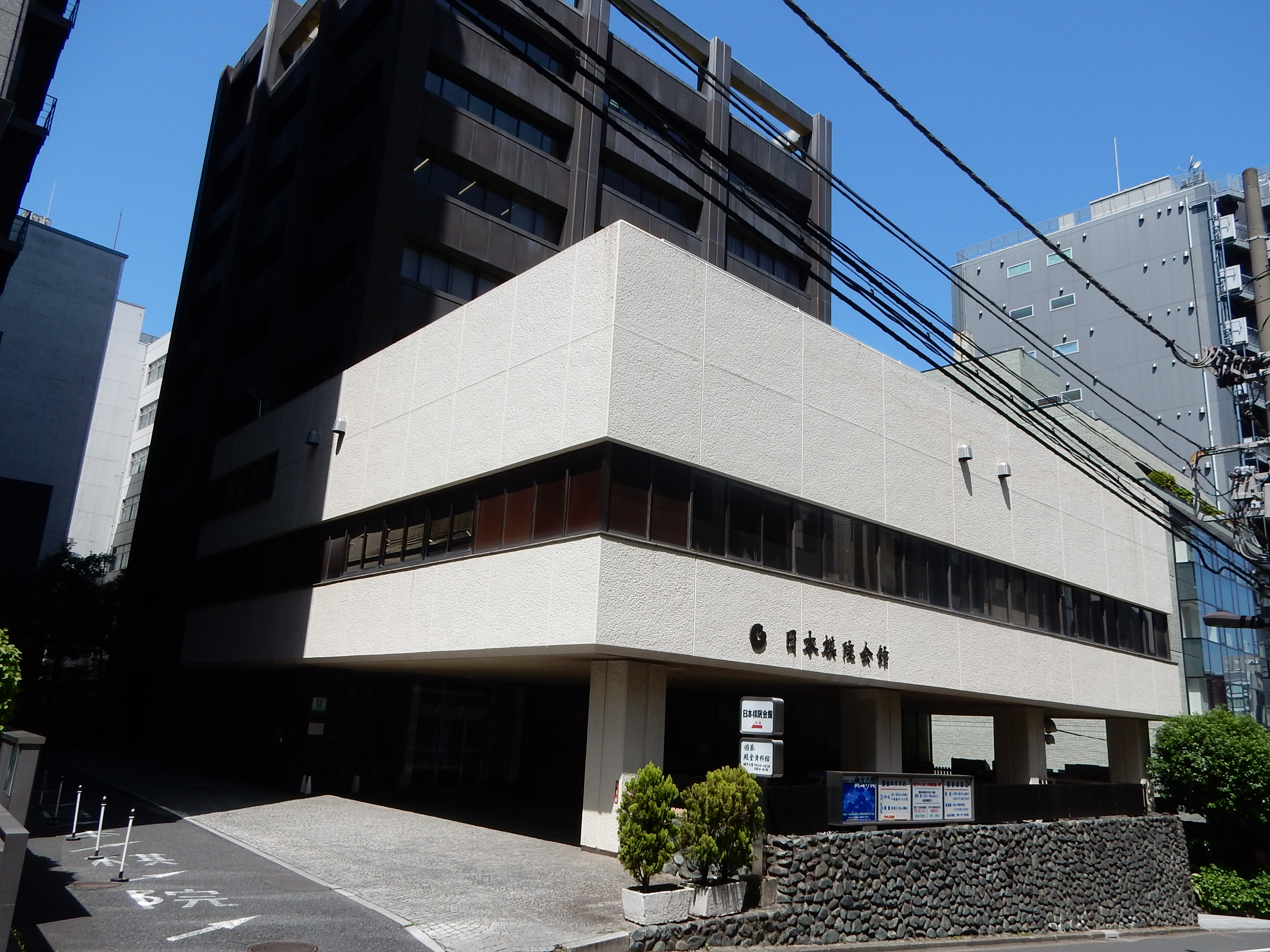
  The Nihon Ki-in headquarters
- 1933 – The "Game of the Century": Go Seigen (1914–2014) opens at the three-three, star and center points against Honinbo Shusai (1874–1940), in a controversial three-month game that challenges the old system.
  The "Game of the Century": Shūsai (white) against Go Seigen (black)
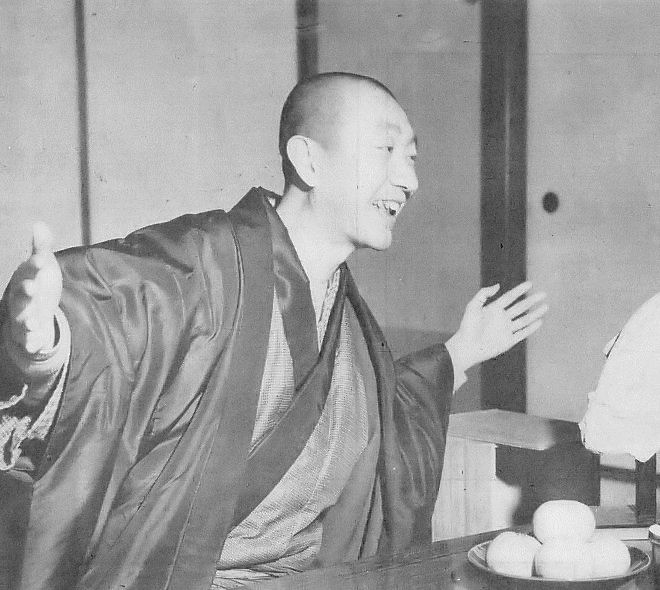
  Go Seigen
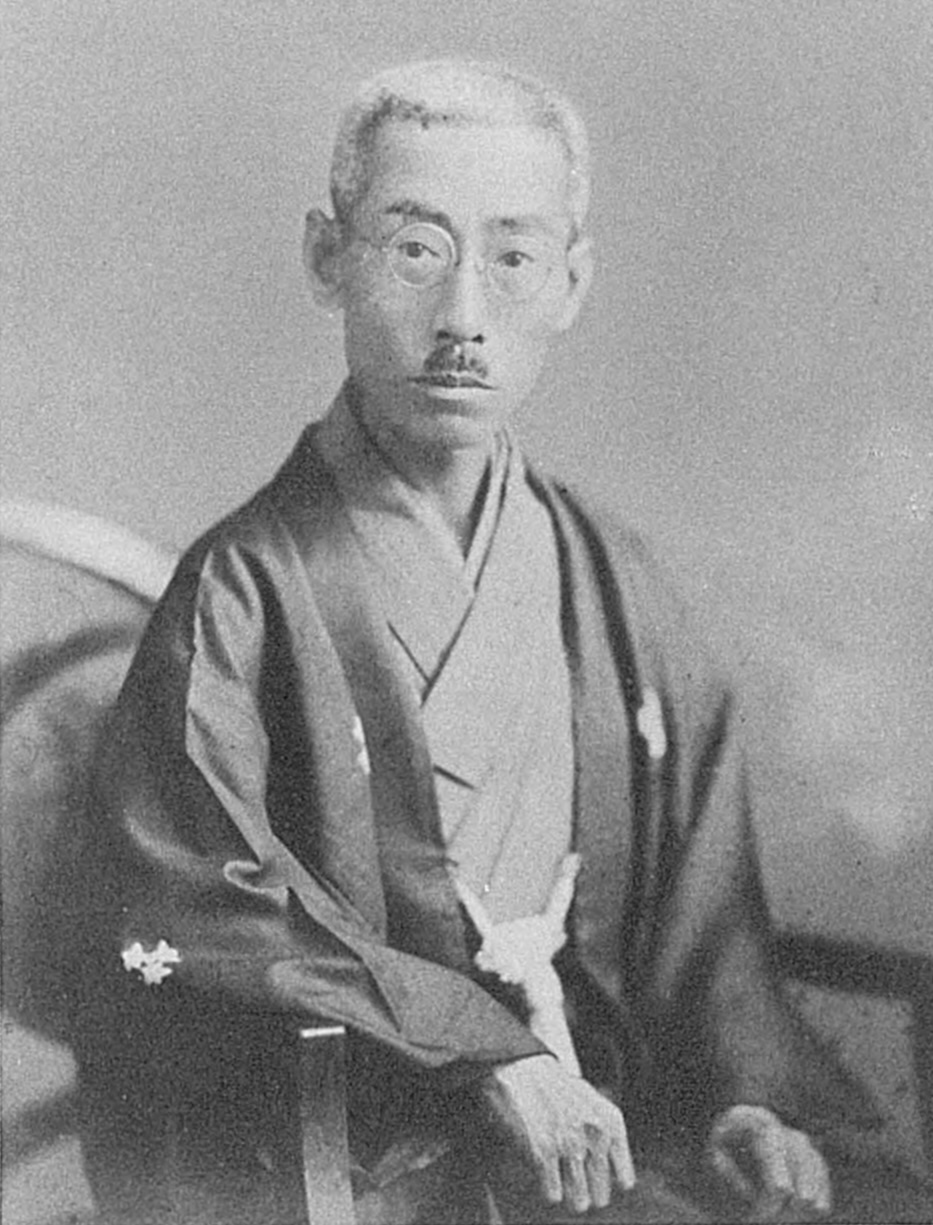
  Hon'inbō Shūsai
- 1934–1937 – Lasker's Go and Go-moku (1934) helps popularize the game in the US; the American Go Association is formed in 1935 and the German Go Association in 1937.
- 1935 – A game of Go is broadcast on radio for the first time.
- 1936–1938 – Shūsai hands the Hon'inbō title to the Nihon Ki-in (1936) and retires in 1938 after a game against Kitani Minoru (1909–1975) that inspires the novel The Master of Go by Yasunari Kawabata (1899–1972).
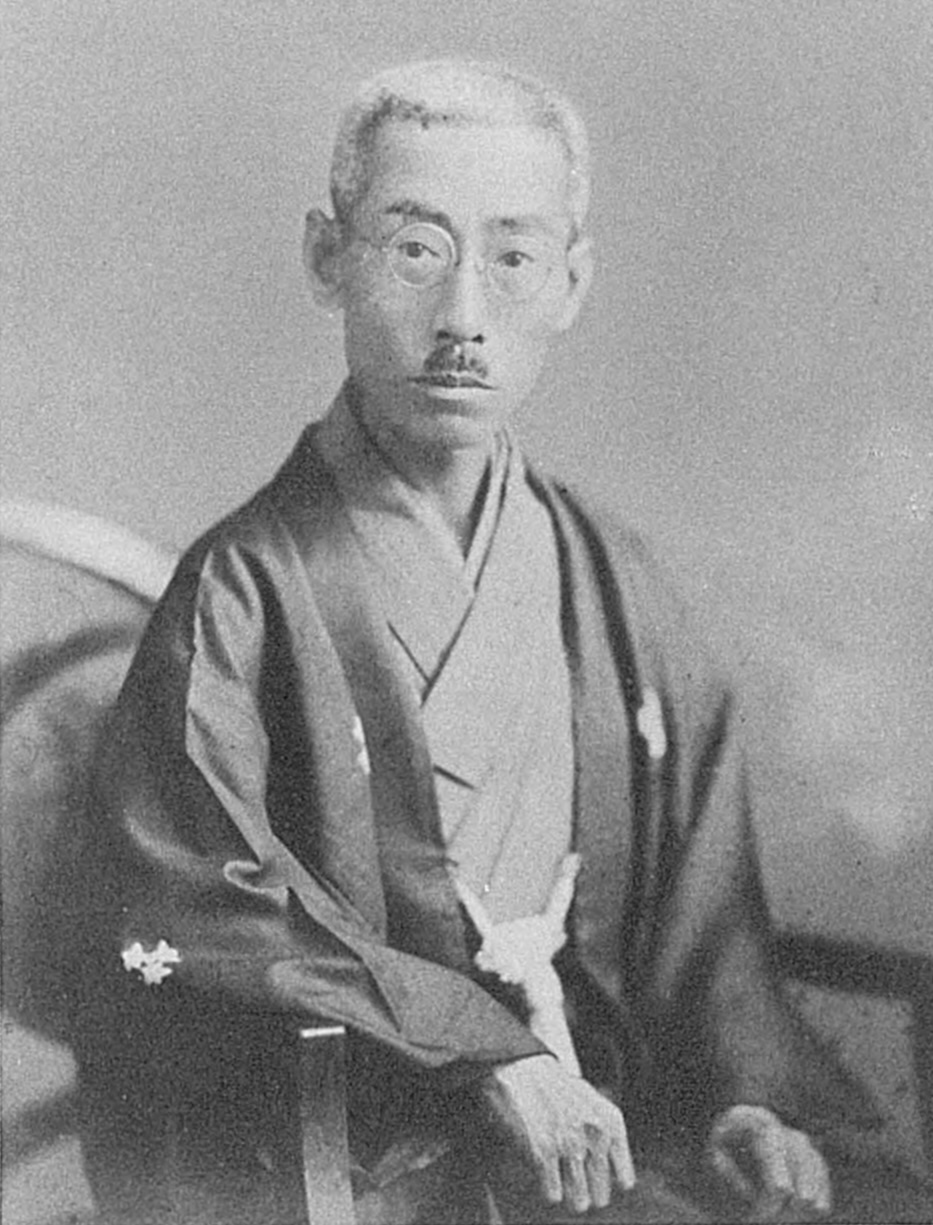
  Hon'inbō Shūsai
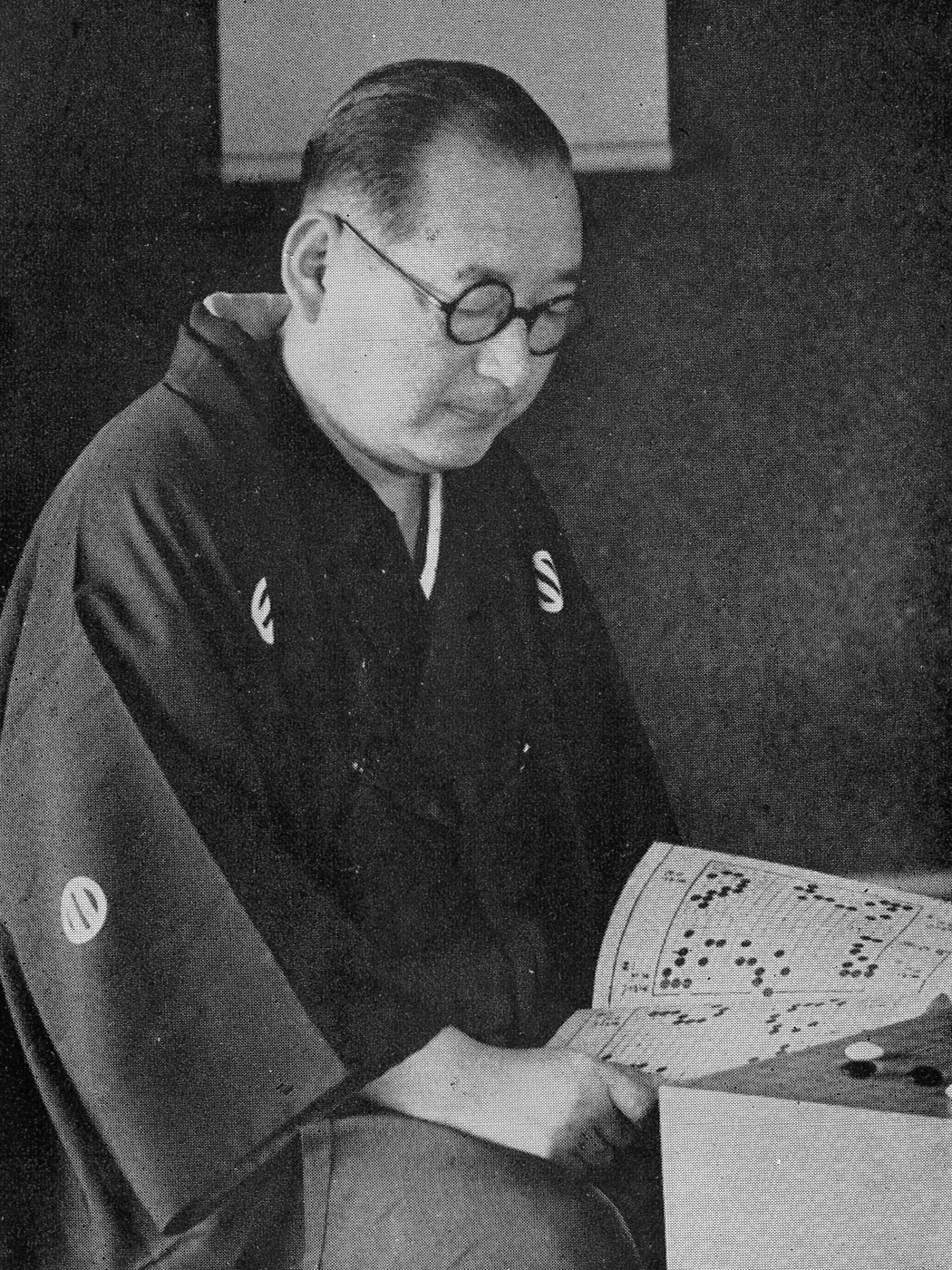
  Kitani Minoru
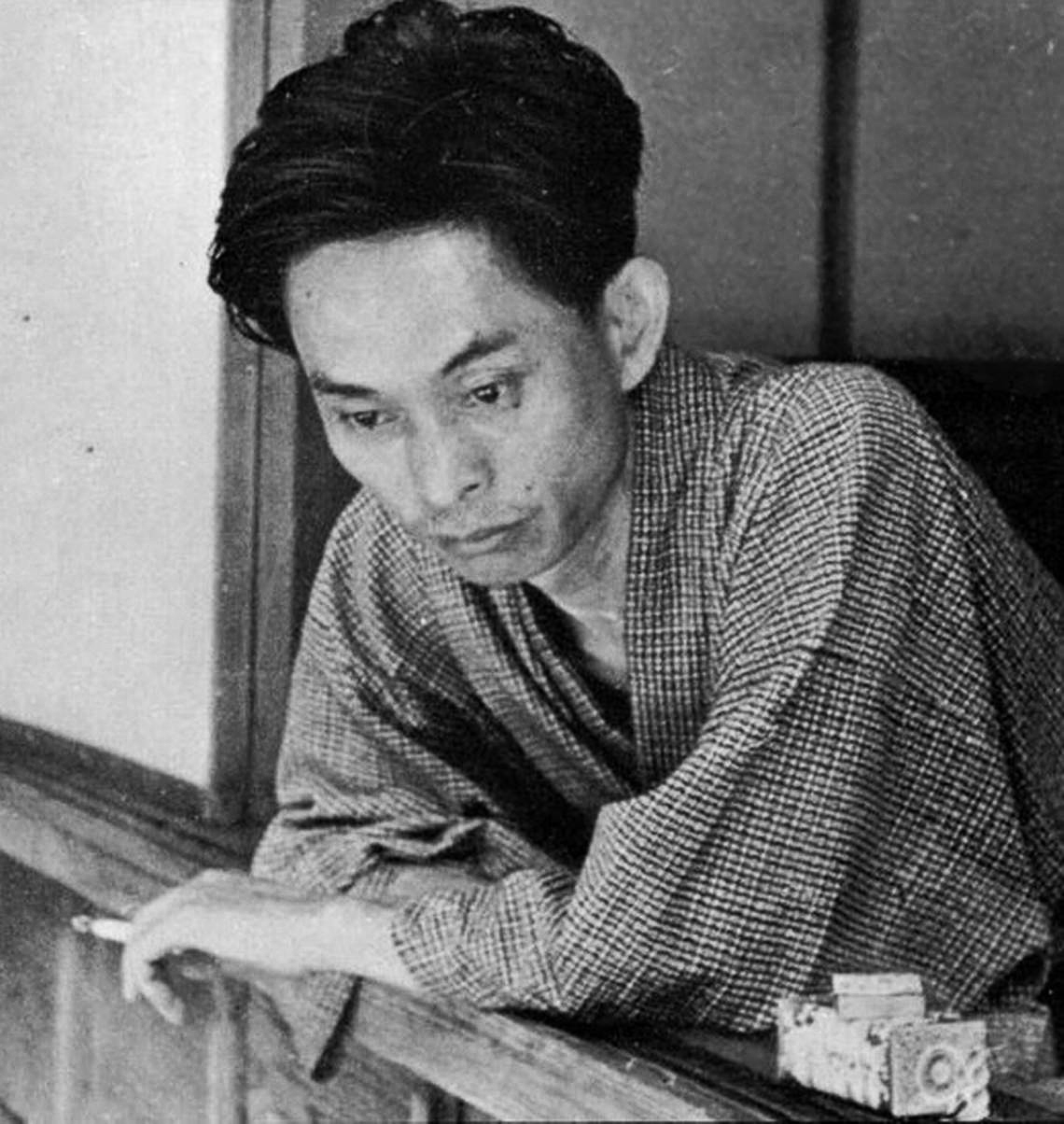
  Yasunari Kawabata
- 1941 – Sekiyama Riichi (1909–1970) wins the first Hon'inbō title tournament, one of the first major modern tournaments with komi (4.5 points).
- 1945 – The "Game Under the Atomic Bomb": the second game of the 3rd Hon'inbō match, played near Hiroshima on August 6, is finished after the blast.
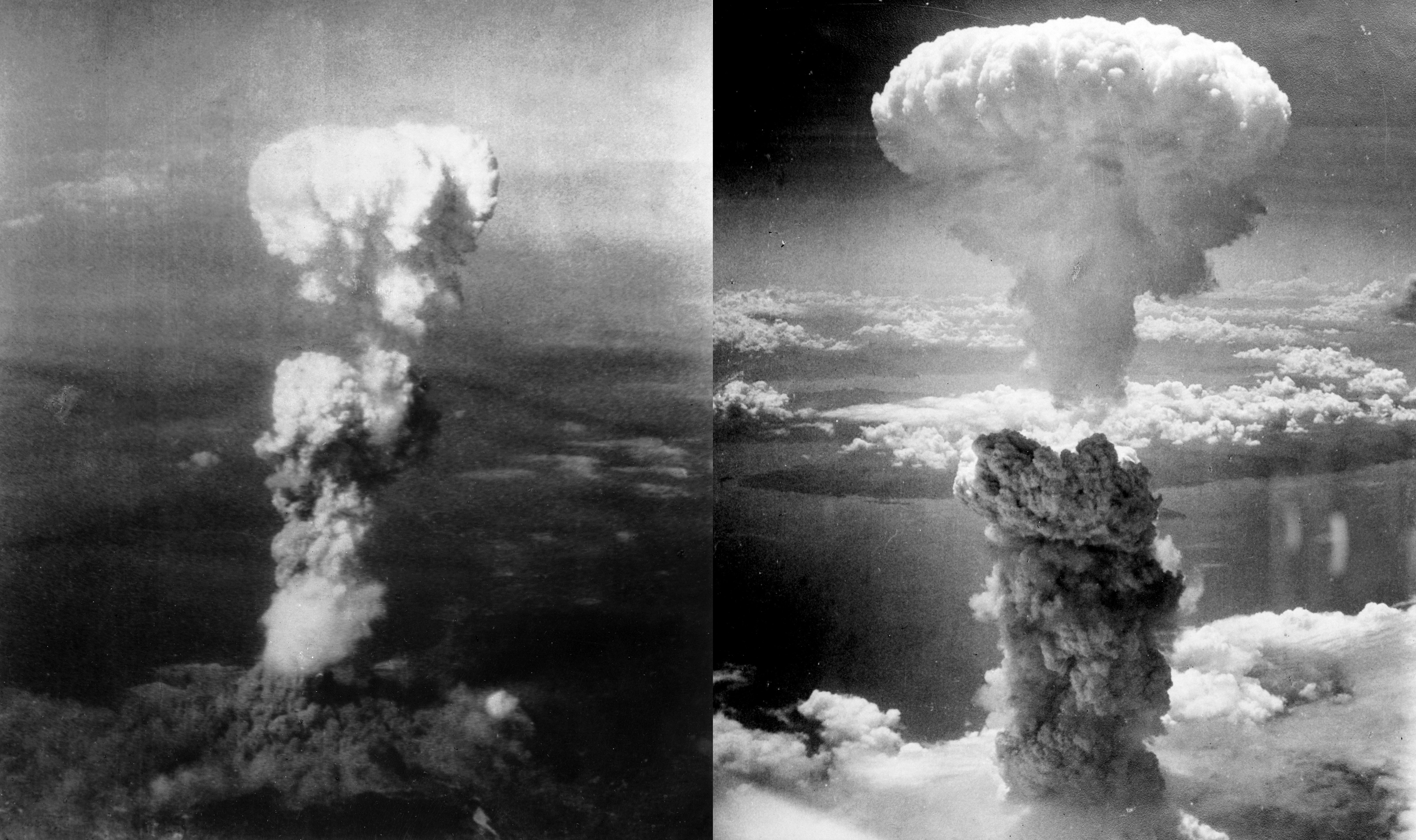
  The atomic bombings of Hiroshima (left) and Nagasaki (right)
- 1949 – Fujisawa Hōsai (1919–1993) becomes the first player to reach 9 dan under the Oteai promotion system.
- 1950 – Go Seigen is awarded 9 dan, and becomes the world's best player; he wins his ten-game matches against all top rivals until 1956.
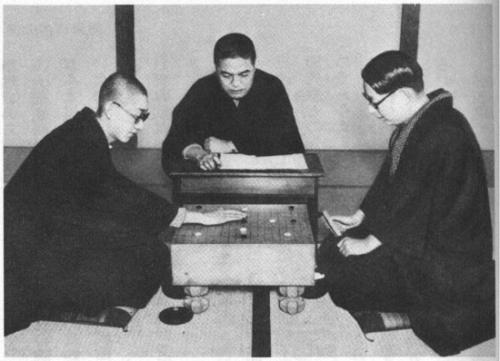
  Go Seigen and Kitani Minoru
- January 1950 – (China) (Japan) Go Seigen becomes the world no. 1.
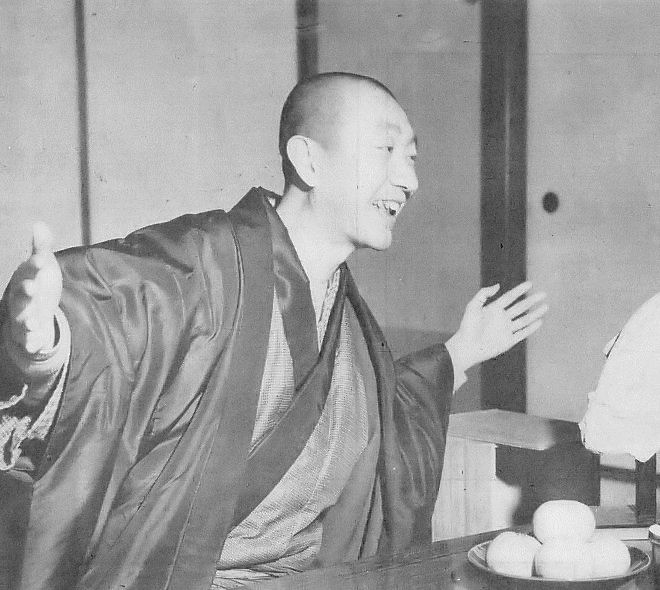
  Go Seigen
- 1954 – The Korea Baduk Association (Hankuk Kiwon) is established, on 28 January. The first NHK Cup is broadcast on radio; it moves to television in 1962.
- 1956 – The first professional tournament in Korea, the Kuksu Cup, starts.
- January 1959 – (Japan) Sakata Eio (1920–2010) becomes the world no. 1.
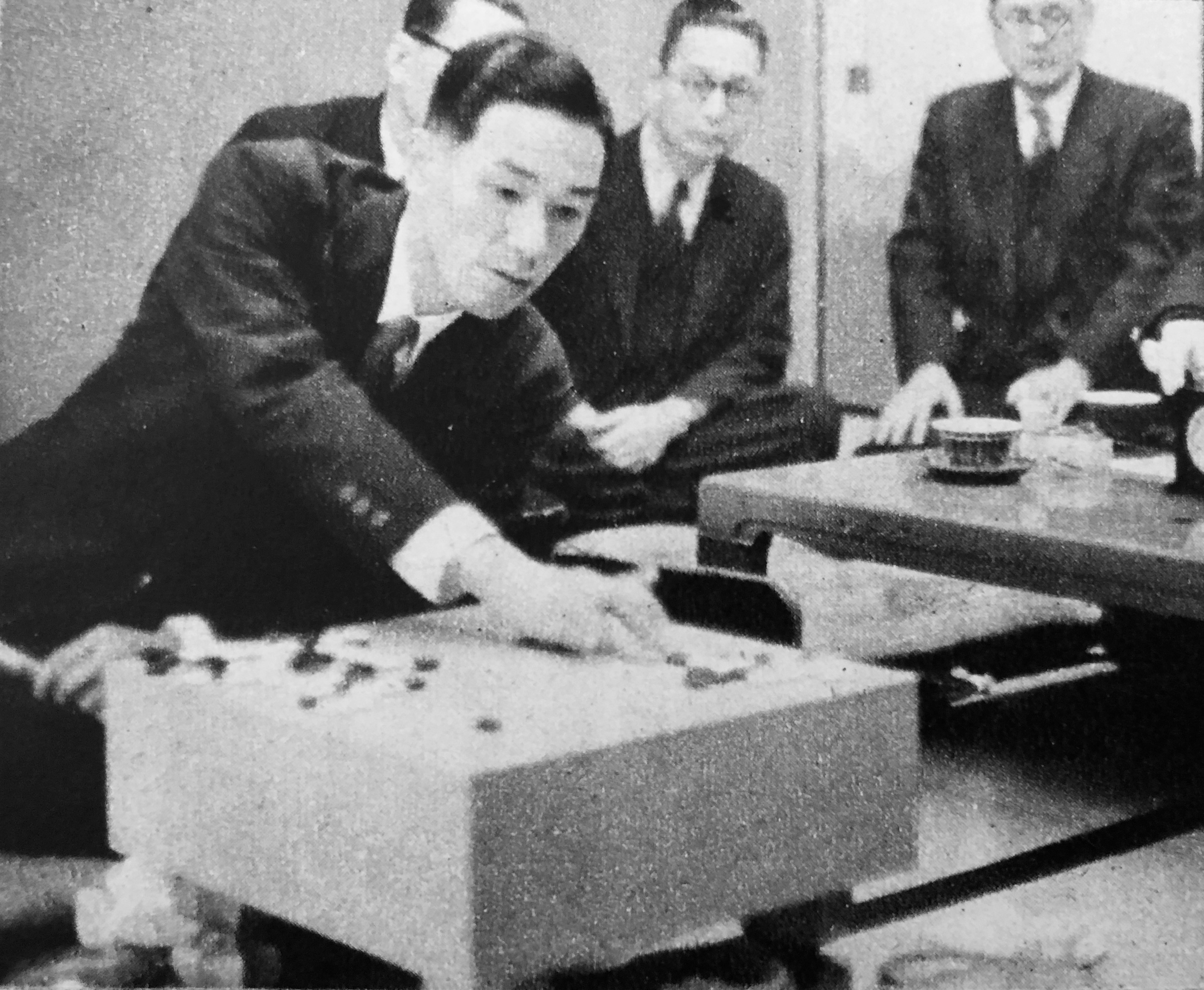
  Sakata Eio
- 1960 – The China–Japan Go Friendship Match starts; it is held every year until 1991.
- 1962 – Fujisawa Shūkō (1925–2009) wins the first Meijin title tournament.
- 1968 – Albert Zobrist (born 1942) writes the first program that plays complete games of Go.
- January 1969 – (Taiwan) (Japan) Rin Kaiho (born 1942) becomes the world no. 1.
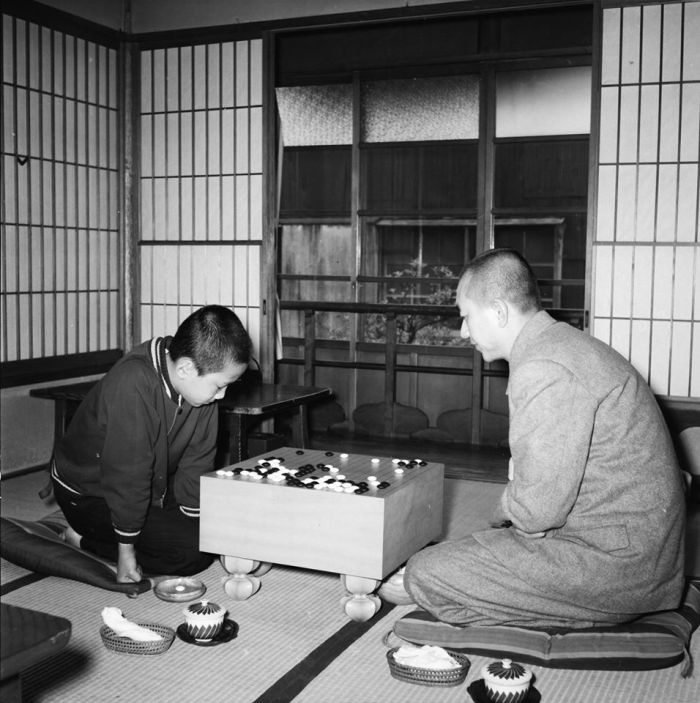
  Go Seigen teaching a young Rin Kaiho
- June 1975 – (Japan) Kato Masao (1947–2004) becomes the world no. 1.
- 1976 – After the "Meijin Incident" of 1974, the Tengen (1975), Kisei and Gosei (1976) titles complete the seven major Japanese titles. Fujisawa Shūkō wins the first Kisei in 1977.
- 19 December 1976 – A friendship match between Taiwan and the United States is played by teletype; in 1978 the UK and the USSR play one by telephone.
- 1978 – Manfred Wimmer (1944–1995) becomes the first Westerner to receive a professional certificate from an East Asian Go association (Kansai Ki-in); James Kerwin is the first at the Nihon Ki-in.
- November 1979 – (South Korea) (Japan) Cho Chikun (born 1956) becomes the world no. 1.
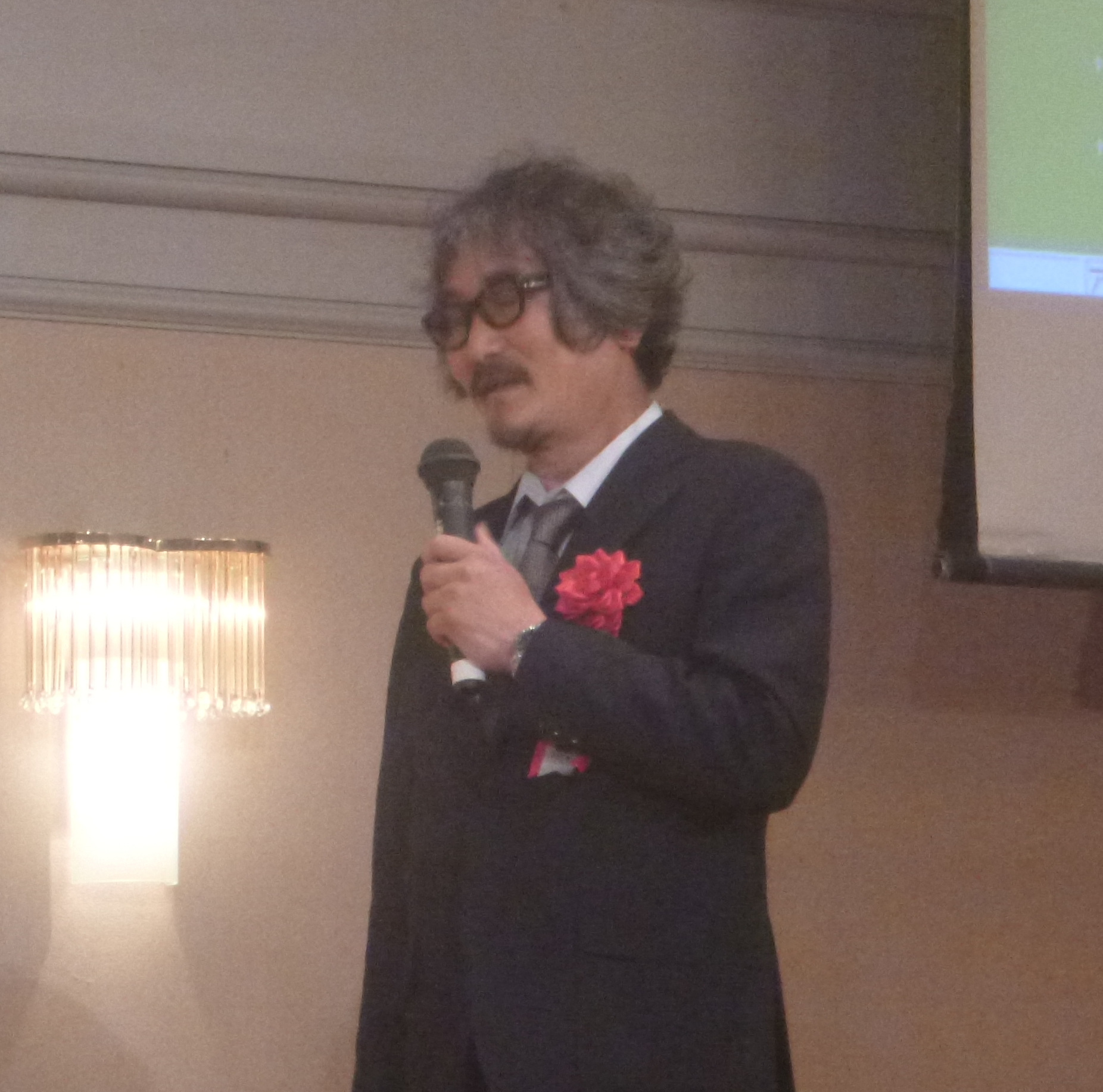
  Cho Chikun
- July 1982 – (South Korea) Cho Hunhyun (born 1953) becomes the world no. 1.
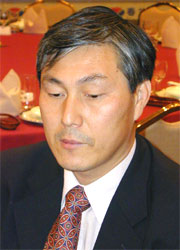
  Cho Hunhyun
- 1984 – Nie Weiping (1952–2026) leads China to victory over Japan in the first China–Japan Super Go Matches, a national triumph.
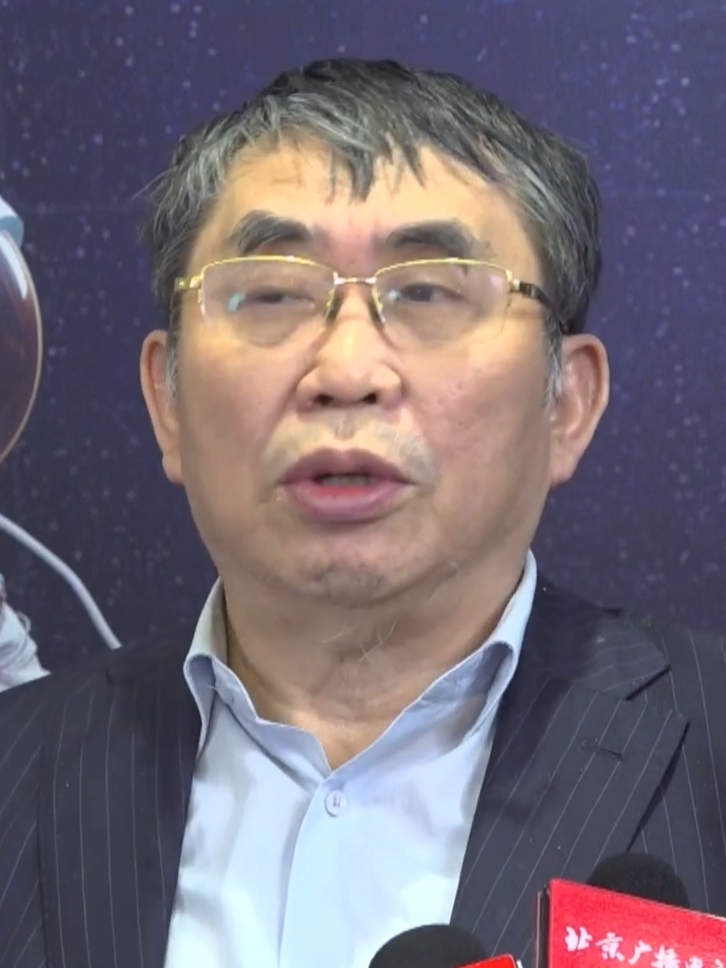
  Nie Weiping
- 1984 – The first computer Go event, the Acornsoft tournament for the BBC Micro, is held. Greg Hale writes inetgo, probably the first program to play Go over the internet.
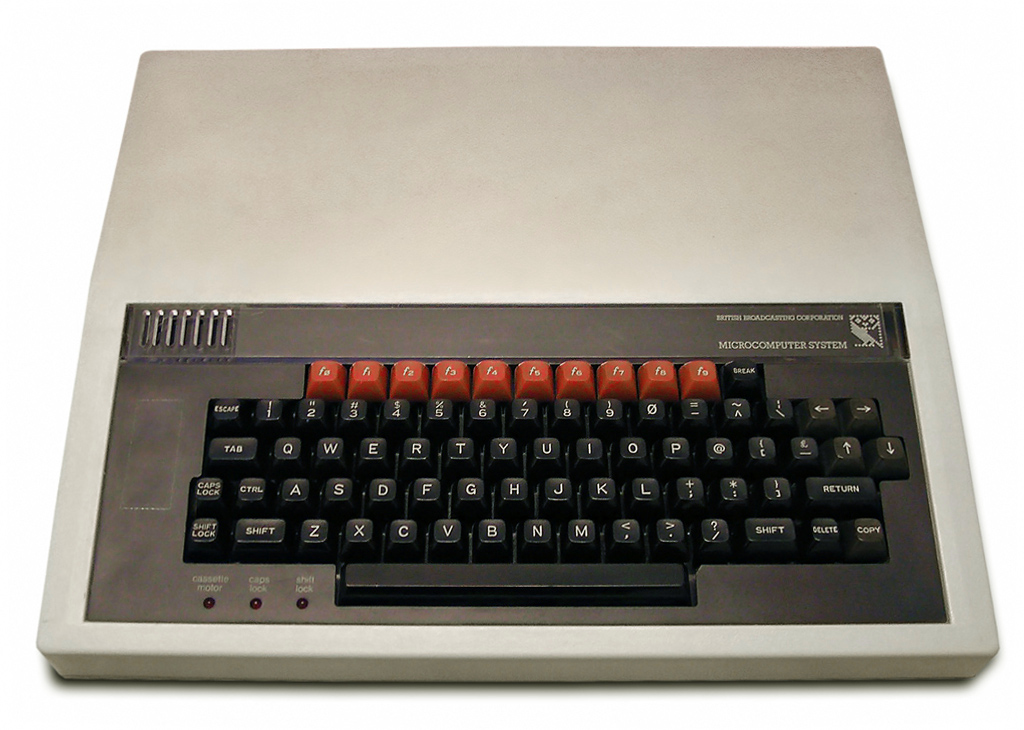
  A BBC Micro
- 1985 – The Ing Prize for computer programs starts; it expires in 2000, when the last challenge was won by HandTalk at an 11-stone handicap against a young professional.
- 1988 – Takemiya Masaki (born 1951) wins the first Fujitsu Cup, one of the first international tournaments.
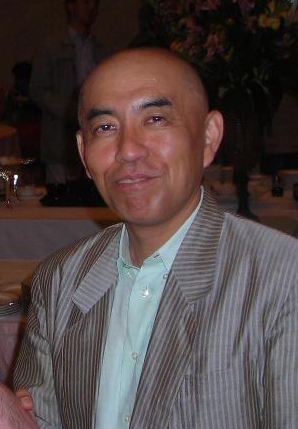
  Takemiya Masaki
- 1989 – Cho Hunhyun, the only Korean entrant, wins the first Ing Cup, the "Olympics of Go", beating Nie Weiping.
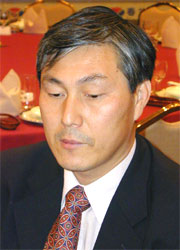
  Cho Hunhyun
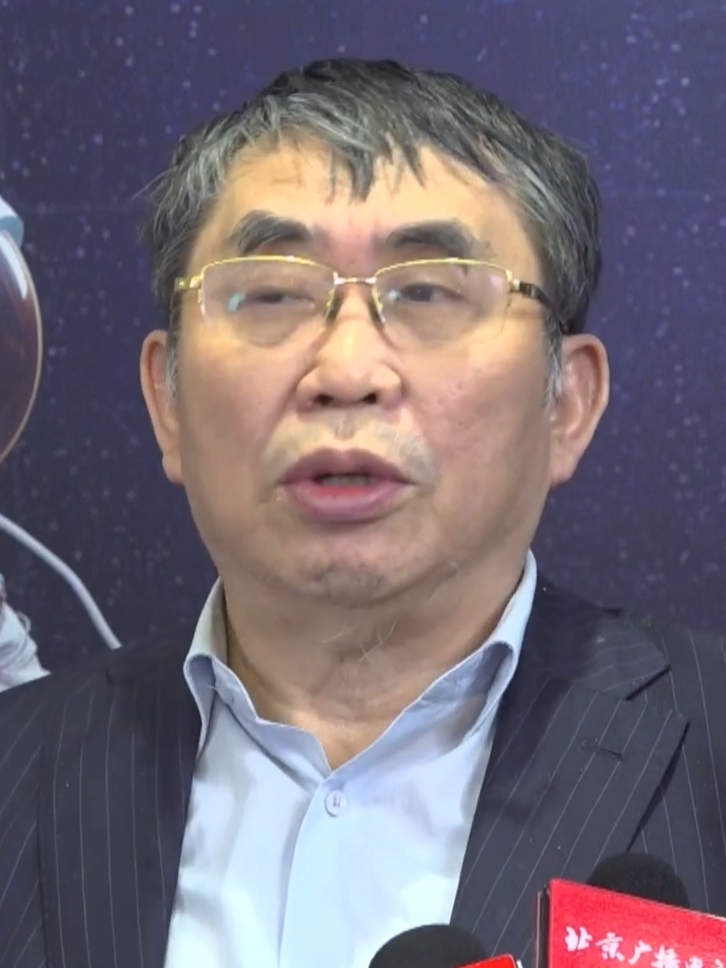
  Nie Weiping
- October 1990 – (South Korea) Lee Changho (born 1975), a student of Cho Hunhyun, becomes the world no. 1 at 15 years old.
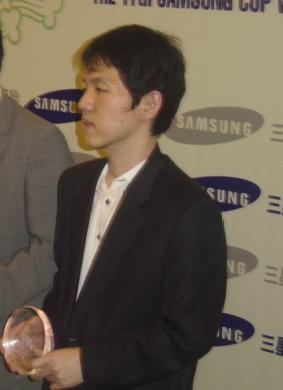
  Lee Changho
- 2 February 1992 – The Internet Go Server (IGS), the first server dedicated to Go, starts.
- 1993 – Bruegmann's Gobble is the first Go program based on random playouts (Monte Carlo).
- 1995 – Ma Xiaochun (born 1964) is the first Chinese player to win an international tournament, taking both the Fujitsu Cup and the Tongyang Securities Cup.
- 1996 – Lee Changho wins the first LG Cup.
- 1996 – Astronauts Daniel Barry (born 1953) and Koichi Wakata (born 1963) become the first people to play Go in space.
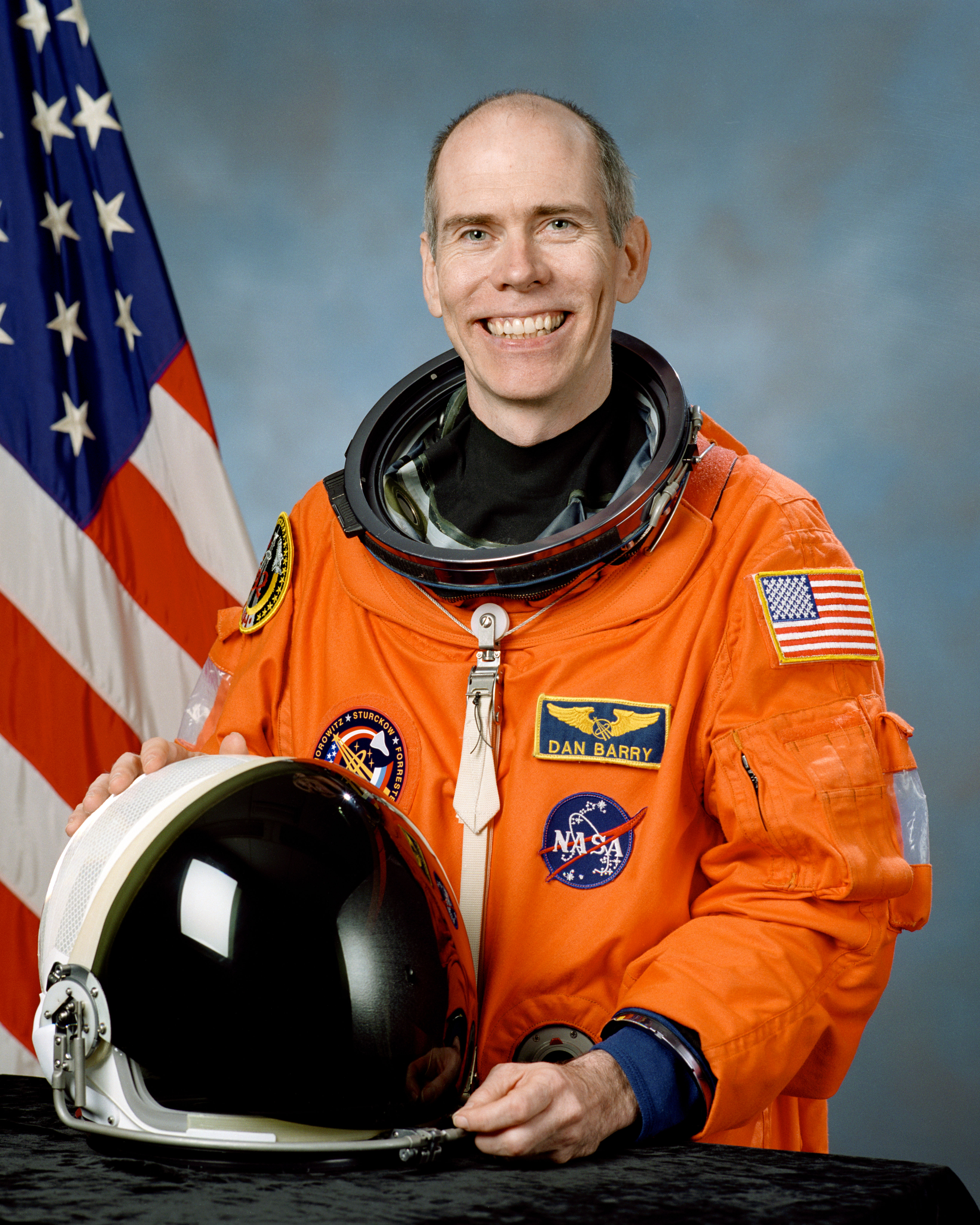
  Daniel Barry
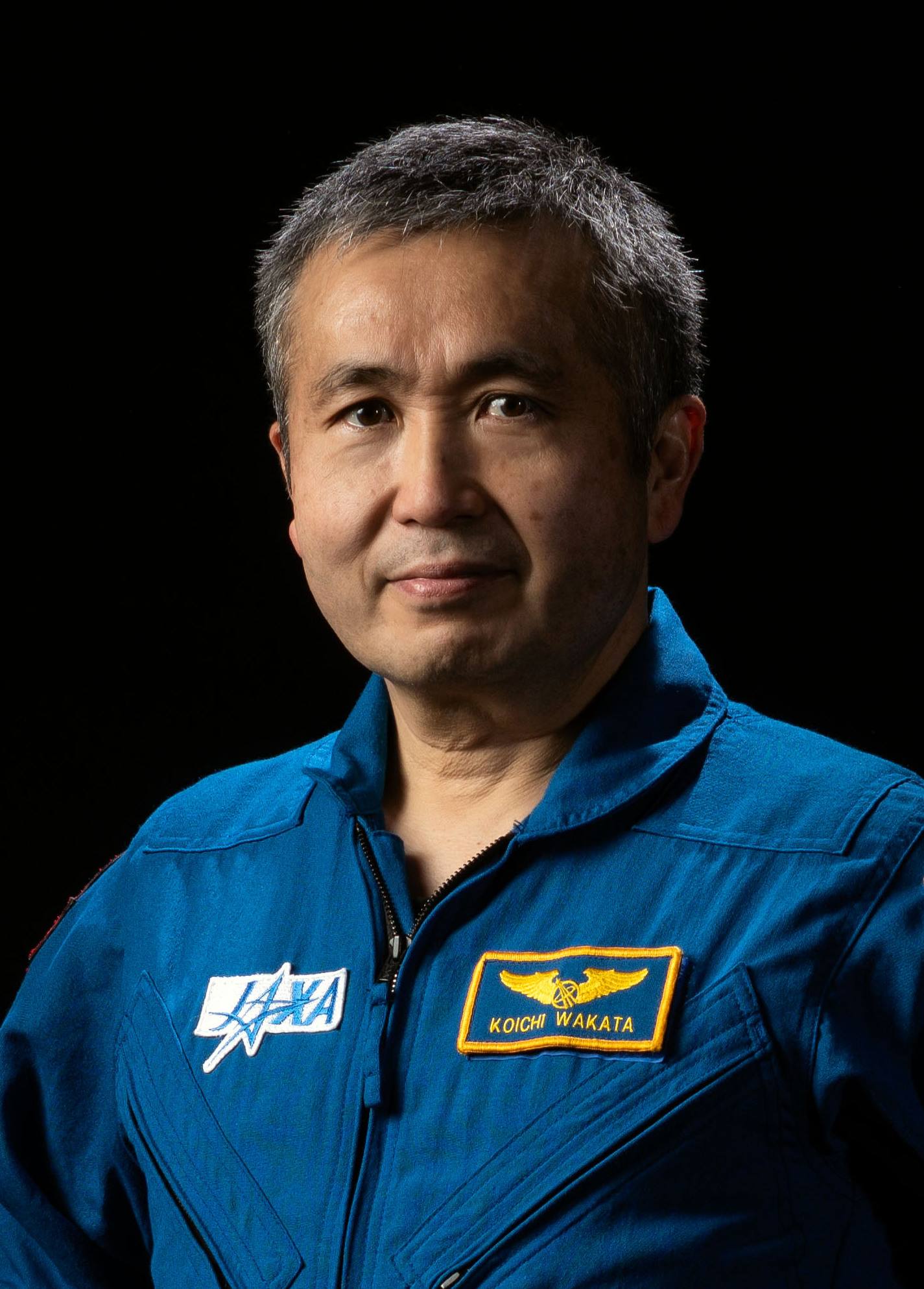
  Koichi Wakata
- 1998–2003 – The manga Hikaru no Go (later also an anime) sparks a Go boom among young players in Japan.
- 2000 – Rui Naiwei (born 1963), playing for Korea, wins the 43rd Kuksu in February and becomes the first woman to win a major title.
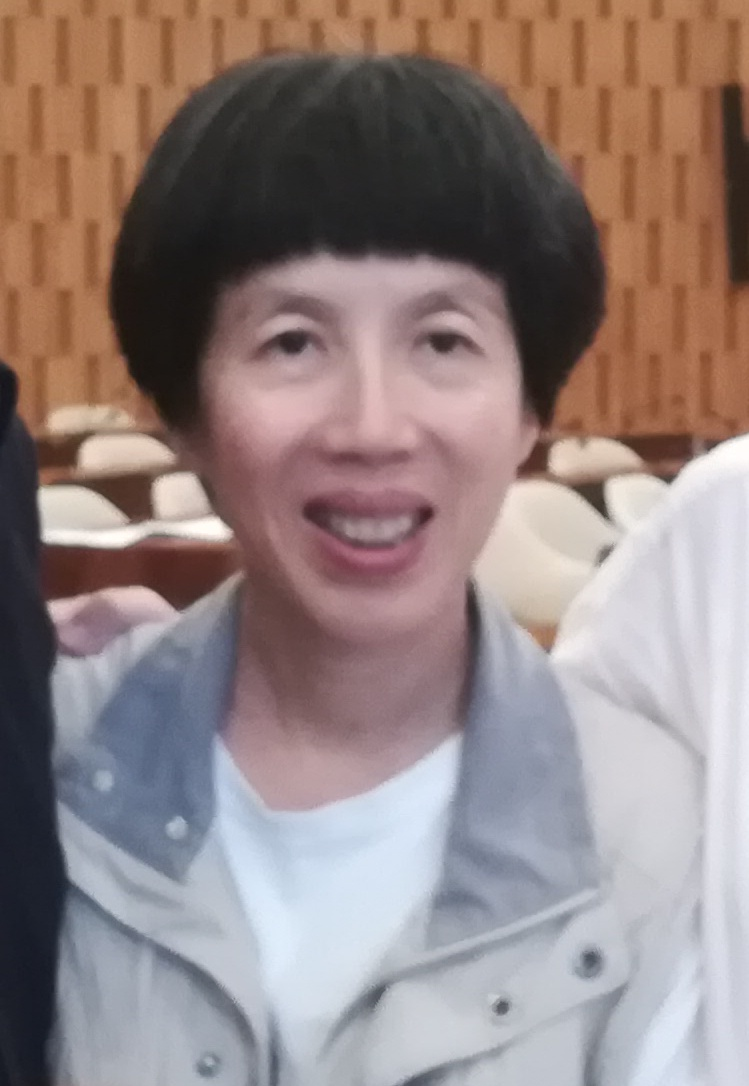
  Rui Naiwei
- 2000 – The American Michael Redmond (born 1963) is the first Westerner to reach 9 dan.
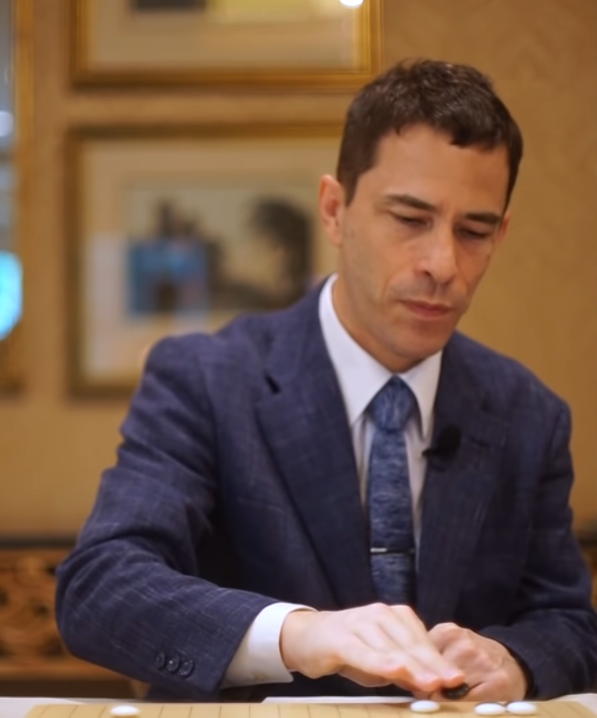
  Michael Redmond in 2018
- 2003 – The Oteai promotion system is discontinued in Japan and a new one introduced.
- January 2006 – (China) Gu Li (born 1983) becomes the world no. 1.
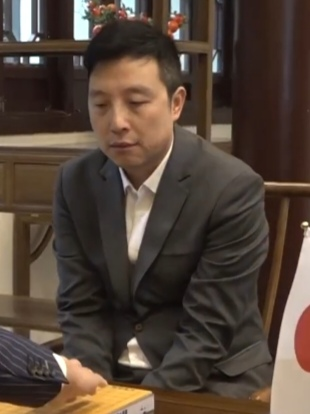
  Gu Li
- 2006 – The UCT algorithm, a Monte Carlo tree search, is developed; a program using it, CrazyStone, wins the Computer Olympiad 9×9 Go event the same year.
- July 2006 – (South Korea) Lee Sedol (born 1983) becomes the world no. 1.
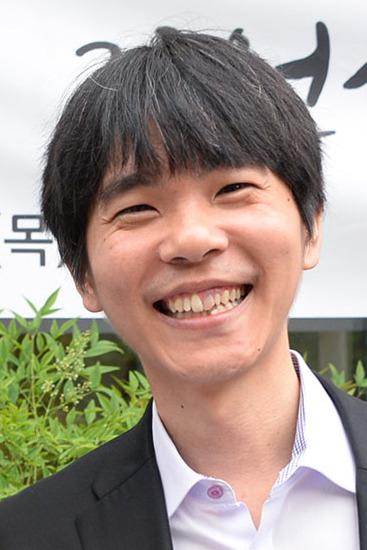
  Lee Sedol
- 2008 – MoGo wins one of three games against the professional Catalin Taranu on 9×9 and later beats an 8-dan Korean professional on 19×19 with a 9-stone handicap.
- 2011–2014 – The American Go Association signs an agreement with the Korean Baduk Association to promote its own professional system (2011); the European Go Federation creates its own (2014).
- July 2011 – (South Korea) Park Junghwan (born 1993) becomes the world no. 1.
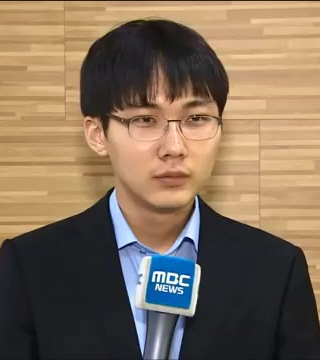
  Park Junghwan
- 2012 – The program Zen beats Takemiya Masaki in games with 5 and 4 handicap stones.
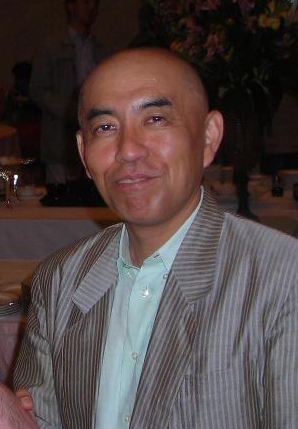
  Takemiya Masaki
- May 2015 – (China) Ke Jie (born 1997) becomes the world no. 1.
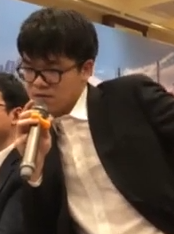
  Ke Jie

The AI era

- October 2015 – AlphaGo, made by Google's DeepMind, beats the European champion Fan Hui (2p) 5–0 in even games: the first time a program beats a professional.
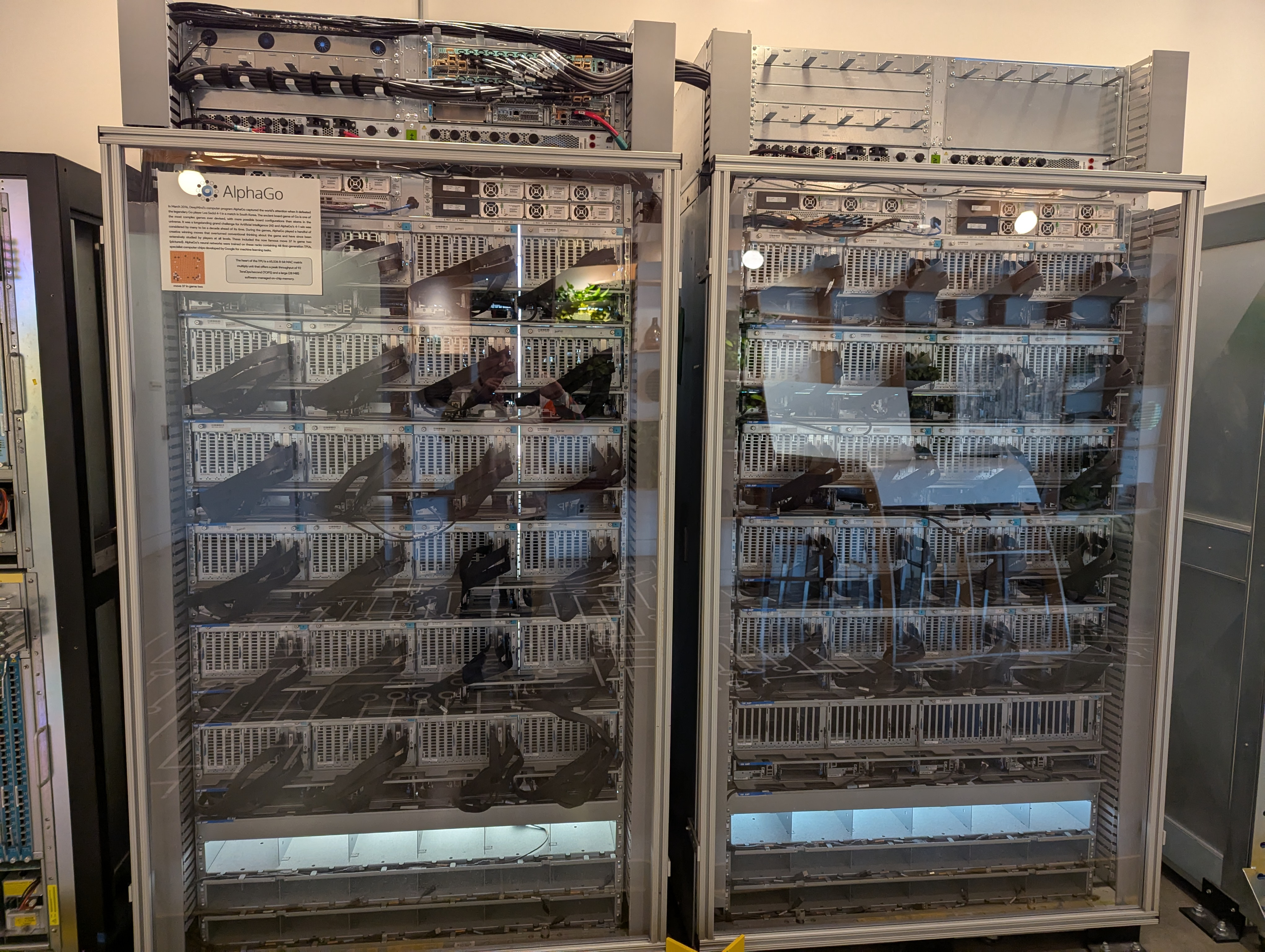
  An AlphaGo computer rack
  Logo of AlphaGo
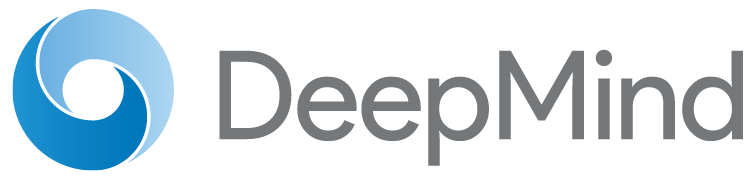
  Logo of DeepMind
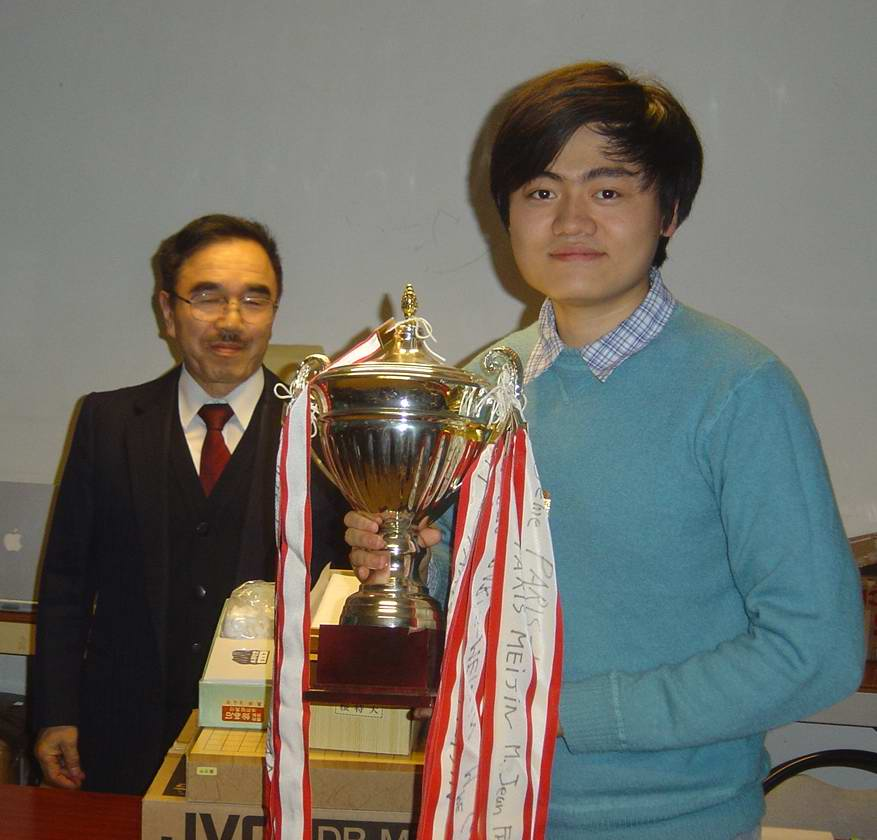
  Fan Hui
- 2016 – DeepMind's AlphaGo beats Lee Sedol (born 1983) 4–1 in Seoul, the first time an AI beats a top professional. The same year, Iyama Yūta (born 1989) holds all seven Japanese major titles at once.
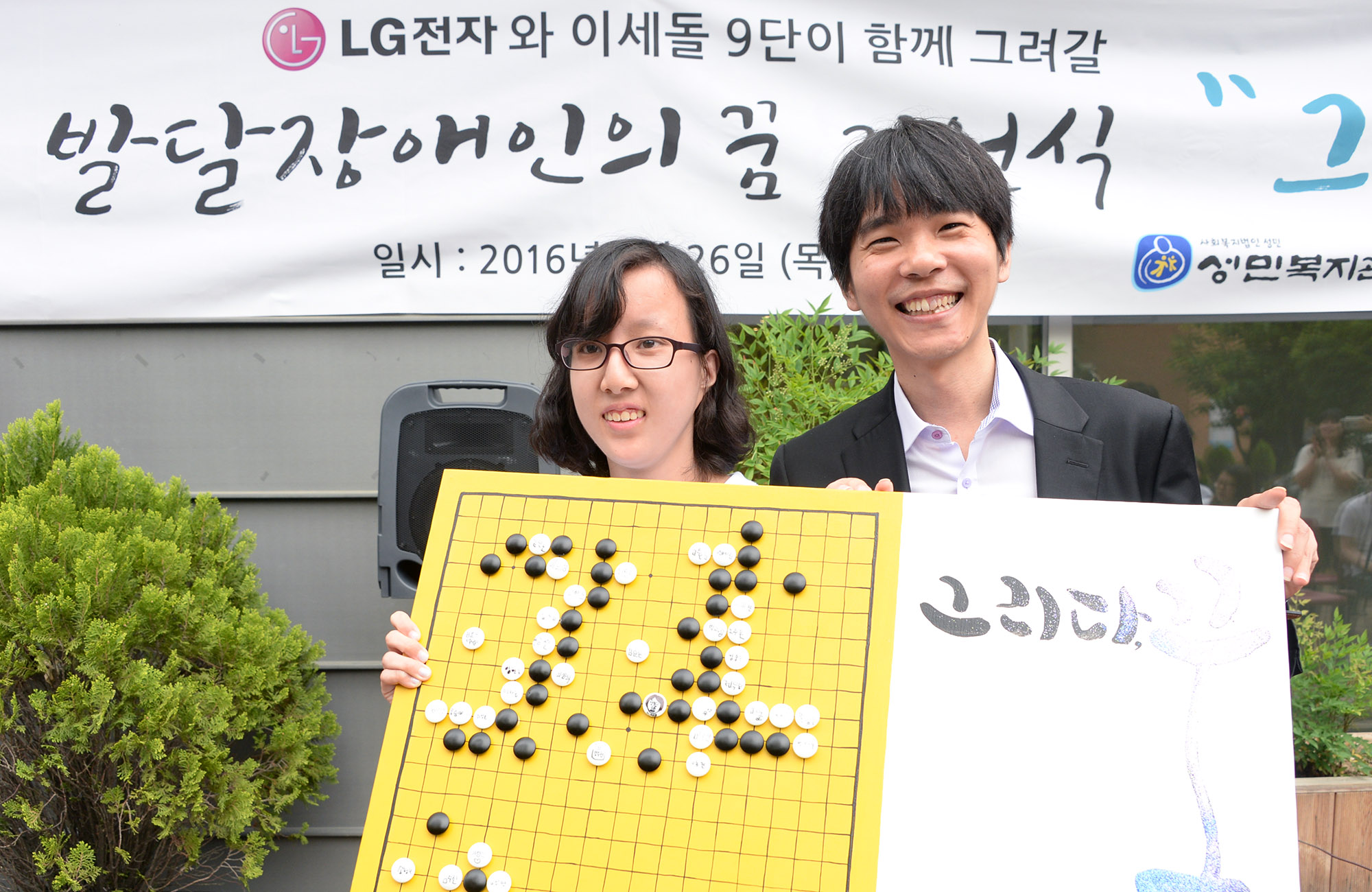
  Lee Sedol in 2016
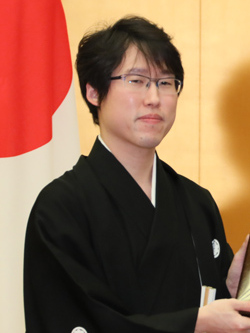
  Iyama Yūta
- Late 2016 – early 2017 – A stronger version of DeepMind's AlphaGo ("Master") wins 60 games in a row, anonymously, online against top professionals.
  Logo of AlphaGo
- May 2017 – DeepMind's new and much improved AlphaGo plays Ke Jie (born 1997) and wins all three games; Ke Jie says its play is "like a god of Go".
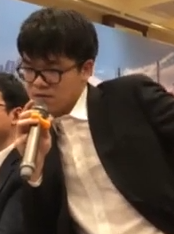
  Ke Jie
  Logo of AlphaGo
- August 2017 – (South Korea) Park Junghwan (born 1993) becomes the world no. 1 for the second time.
- May 2018 – (South Korea) Shin Jinseo (born 2000), whose style resembles that of the AIs, becomes the world no. 1.
- 2019 – The open-source Go AI KataGo is created by David Wu.
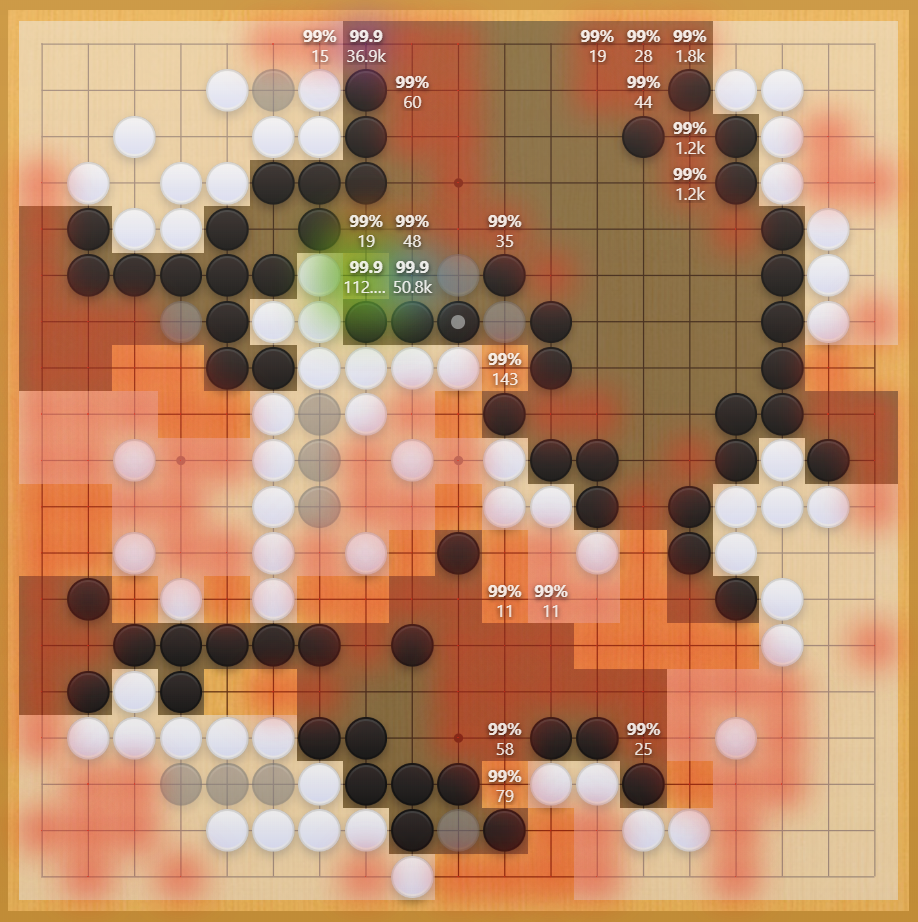
  A game analysed with KataGo
- 2019 – Lee Sedol announces his retirement, citing AlphaGo as "an entity that cannot be defeated".
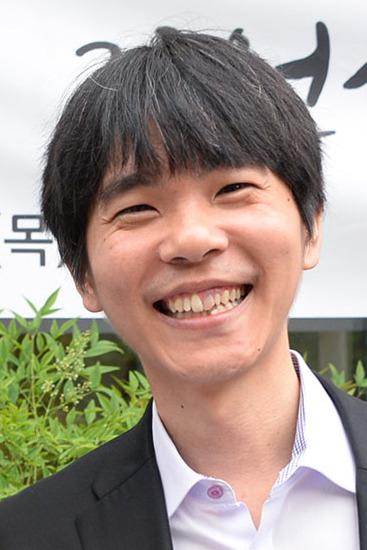
  Lee Sedol
- 2026 – Shin Jinseo defeats a new version of KataGo on a 2-stone handicap, coming back from a first-game defeat to win the next two.

| Date | Description | Image |
Legends and first records
| Unknown | The "Rotten Handle" legend of the origin of the game: a carpenter in Zhejiang watches deities playing a mysterious game and loses track of time. | |
| c. 2356–2255 BCE | According to legend, Emperor Yao creates the game to teach discipline and balance to his son Danzhu. Another legend has Shun, his successor, invent it for his own son. | Emperor Yao |
| 548 BCE | The earliest written reference to the game is usually taken to be the historical annal Zuo Zhuan, about an event of this year; it is also mentioned in the Analects of Confucius (c. 551 – c. 479 BCE) and in the books of Mencius (c. 371 – c. 289 BCE). | First page of an edition of the Zuo Zhuan |
| 3rd century BCE | Mencius mentions a famous player called Yi Qiu. | Mencius |
| 206 BCE – 24 CE | Western Han: a broken piece of a pottery board, the earliest board found in China, is later unearthed in Shaanxi. | |
| 1st–3rd century | Eastern Han: Ban Gu (32–92) writes Yì Zhǐ ("The Essentials of Go"), the oldest surviving text devoted to Go, and boards have 17 × 17 lines. | A Han dynasty Go board |
| c. 250 | The "Wu Diagrams" record the earliest known game of Go. | |
Ancient and medieval East Asia
| 3rd–6th century | The board grows from 17 × 17 to 19 × 19 lines. The Dunhuang Go Manual, the first book devoted to Go on the larger board, dates to this period. | The Dunhuang Go Manual, British Library |
| 475 | In the rivalry between Goguryeo (37 BCE – 668) and Baekje (18 BCE – 660), the Goguryeo priest To-lim uses the game of Go to spy on King Yogyong; the invasion of Baekje follows. | A copy of a Baekje game of baduk |
| Around 500 | Emperor Wu of Liang (464–549) promotes the game and holds the first documented national tournament; 278 players receive a rank. | Emperor Wu of Liang |
| Early 7th century | Chinese chronicles (the Records of the Sui) report that the Japanese enjoy Go. | |
| 618–907 | Tang dynasty: the court creates the post of Go attendant ("Qídàizhào") for players who play against the emperor, and players are ranked. Wang Jixin is credited with the "Ten Golden Rules of Go". | Early Go stones |
| Early 8th century | The game reaches Tibet and Mongolia, where the 17 × 17 board survives. | A Tibetan Go board |
| 8th century | Go reaches Japan, traditionally brought back from the Tang court by Kibi no Makibi (695–775); the Taihō Code of 701 already describes it. | Kibi no Makibi |
| 737 | The Chinese player Yang Jiying travels to Korea as an envoy and no player of Silla (57 BCE – 935) can match him. | |
| c. 1050 | Song dynasty (960–1279): a major treatise in thirteen chapters, the Classic of Go (Qíjīng Shísān Piān), is written; the Song era also produces many other treatises on strategy. | |
| c. 1100 | The Wangyou Qingle Ji, compiled by Li Yimin, is the oldest surviving Go book. It collects essays, old game records and the first set of tsumego problems, among them a game between a Japanese prince and Gu Shiyan, the first recorded double-ladder breaker. | |
| 1349 | Yuan dynasty (1271–1368): Yan Defu and Yan Tianzhang compile the Xuanxuan Qijing ("Gateway to All Marvels"), six volumes with 376 problems, essays and game records; it inspires problem books around the world. | Weiqi stones, Inner Mongolia Museum |
| Ming dynasty | Chinese scoring changes from territory to stone scoring. The Hongwu Emperor (1328–1398) issues an "Edict Banning Weiqi" in the face of widespread gambling on the game. | Go at the Ming court |
| 1582 | Honinbo Sansa (1559–1623) plays a triple ko against Kashio Rigen (1565–?) at a monastery in Kyoto in the presence of Oda Nobunaga (1534–1582); the game is suspended. The next day Nobunaga is killed, and a triple ko is considered bad luck ever after. | Oda Nobunaga Hon'inbō Sansa |
| 1588 | Toyotomi Hideyoshi (1537–1598) organizes the first Japanese Go tournament; Hon'inbō (Sansa) wins and is granted a salary. | The Go board of Hideyoshi and Ieyasu, Ryōgen-in Toyotomi Hideyoshi |
Edo-period Japan and Qing China
| 1603 | Honinbo Sansa (1559–1623) is appointed by Shogun Tokugawa Ieyasu (1543–1616) as head of the Go world (Meijin Godokoro): the major Japanese Go school system begins. | Hon'inbō Sansa Tokugawa Ieyasu |
| 1612 | The Tokugawa shogunate (1603–1868) establishes four hereditary Go houses (Hon'inbō, Inoue, Yasui and Hayashi) and pays them stipends; they compete for 250–300 years. | Tokugawa Ieyasu, founder of the Tokugawa shogunate |
| 1615 | Nicolas Trigault (1577–1628) publishes in Augsburg the diaries of the Jesuit Matteo Ricci (1552–1610), which explain the game of weiqi; the book goes through at least 16 editions in European languages. | Nicolas Trigault, by Rubens Matteo Ricci |
| 1626–1628 | The first castle game, played before the shogun, takes place in 1626; in 1628 the castle games become an official yearly ceremony. | |
| 1645–1653 | The first official challenge match (sōgo) to decide the Meijin, between Hon'inbō Sanetsu (1611–1658) and Yasui Sanchi (1617–1703). | |
| c. 1650 | Huang Longshi, probably the strongest Chinese player of the Qing dynasty (1644–1912), is born (c. 1650 – c. 1694). | |
| 17th–18th century | The philosopher Leibniz (1646–1716) publishes an article on Go with a picture of a game, saying he does not know all the rules. | Gottfried Wilhelm Leibniz |
| Late 17th century | The fourth Hon'inbō, Dōsaku (1645–1702), defeats every top player of his time and is praised as having "thirteen-dan strength". | Hon'inbō Dōsaku |
| 1694 | Thomas Hyde (1636–1703) writes the first detailed description of Go in a European language, in his treatise on oriental board games. | Thomas Hyde |
| 1713 | The Igo Hatsuyoron, a collection of very hard problems, is created. | Problem 76 of the Igo Hatsuyoron |
| 1739 | Shi Xiangxia and Fan Xiping play the "Ten Games at Danghu" in Pinghu, Zhejiang. | |
| 1840 | The "blood-vomiting game": Hon'inbō Jōwa (1787–1847) beats Akaboshi Intetsu (1810–1835) in a week-long match; Akaboshi collapses from exhaustion and dies soon after. | |
| 1846 | The "ear-reddening game": Honinbo Shusaku (1829–1862)'s move 127 stuns Gennan Inseki (1798–1859), and becomes one of the best moves of all time. | The "ear-reddening" game Hon'inbō Shūsaku |
| 1863 | The last castle games are played as the crisis of the shogunate disrupts the ceremonies. | |
Modern professional Go
| 1868 | The Meiji Restoration (1866–1869) ends the official stipends of the Go houses; Go loses its patrons and the masters struggle. | Emperor Meiji |
| 1872 | The first recorded game of Go in Europe is played between Kido Takayoshi (1833–1877) and Ōkubo Toshimichi (1830–1878) of the Iwakura Mission (1871–1873). | Kido Takayoshi Ōkubo Toshimichi Members of the Iwakura Mission |
| 1878 | The first newspaper Go column appears in Japan, on 1 April. In 1879 the Hoensha society forms; its journal Igo Shinpo is the first Go magazine. | |
| 1880 | Oskar Korschelt (1853–1940), who learned the game in Japan from Murase Shūho, publishes Das Go Spiel: the first systematic description in a Western language. | Oskar Korschelt |
| 1905–1908 | Edward Lasker (1885–1981) learns Go in Berlin (1905) and later founds the New York Go Club; in 1908 Arthur Smith publishes the first Go book in English, The Game of Go. | Edward Lasker |
| 1909–1910 | The Japanese professional Takabe Dōhei (1881–1951) visits China and introduces play without fixed starting stones. | |
| 1924 | The Nihon Ki-in, Japan's professional Go association, is founded, ending the hereditary house system and inaugurating the modern rank and tournament system. | The Nihon Ki-in headquarters |
| 1933 | The "Game of the Century": Go Seigen (1914–2014) opens at the three-three, star and center points against Honinbo Shusai (1874–1940), in a controversial three-month game that challenges the old system. | The "Game of the Century": Shūsai (white) against Go Seigen (black) Go Seigen Hon'inbō Shūsai |
| 1934–1937 | Lasker's Go and Go-moku (1934) helps popularize the game in the US; the American Go Association is formed in 1935 and the German Go Association in 1937. | |
| 1935 | A game of Go is broadcast on radio for the first time. | |
| 1936–1938 | Shūsai hands the Hon'inbō title to the Nihon Ki-in (1936) and retires in 1938 after a game against Kitani Minoru (1909–1975) that inspires the novel The Master of Go by Yasunari Kawabata (1899–1972). | Hon'inbō Shūsai Kitani Minoru Yasunari Kawabata |
| 1941 | Sekiyama Riichi (1909–1970) wins the first Hon'inbō title tournament, one of the first major modern tournaments with komi (4.5 points). | |
| 1945 | The "Game Under the Atomic Bomb": the second game of the 3rd Hon'inbō match, played near Hiroshima on August 6, is finished after the blast. | The atomic bombings of Hiroshima (left) and Nagasaki (right) |
| 1949 | Fujisawa Hōsai (1919–1993) becomes the first player to reach 9 dan under the Oteai promotion system. | |
| 1950 | Go Seigen is awarded 9 dan, and becomes the world's best player; he wins his ten-game matches against all top rivals until 1956. | Go Seigen and Kitani Minoru |
| January 1950 | (China) (Japan) Go Seigen becomes the world no. 1. | Go Seigen |
| 1954 | The Korea Baduk Association (Hankuk Kiwon) is established, on 28 January. The first NHK Cup is broadcast on radio; it moves to television in 1962. | |
| 1956 | The first professional tournament in Korea, the Kuksu Cup, starts. | |
| January 1959 | (Japan) Sakata Eio (1920–2010) becomes the world no. 1. | Sakata Eio |
| 1960 | The China–Japan Go Friendship Match starts; it is held every year until 1991. | |
| 1962 | Fujisawa Shūkō (1925–2009) wins the first Meijin title tournament. | |
| 1968 | Albert Zobrist (born 1942) writes the first program that plays complete games of Go. | |
| January 1969 | (Taiwan) (Japan) Rin Kaiho (born 1942) becomes the world no. 1. | Go Seigen teaching a young Rin Kaiho |
| June 1975 | (Japan) Kato Masao (1947–2004) becomes the world no. 1. | |
| 1976 | After the "Meijin Incident" of 1974, the Tengen (1975), Kisei and Gosei (1976) titles complete the seven major Japanese titles. Fujisawa Shūkō wins the first Kisei in 1977. | |
| 19 December 1976 | A friendship match between Taiwan and the United States is played by teletype; in 1978 the UK and the USSR play one by telephone. | |
| 1978 | Manfred Wimmer (1944–1995) becomes the first Westerner to receive a professional certificate from an East Asian Go association (Kansai Ki-in); James Kerwin is the first at the Nihon Ki-in. | |
| November 1979 | (South Korea) (Japan) Cho Chikun (born 1956) becomes the world no. 1. | Cho Chikun |
| July 1982 | (South Korea) Cho Hunhyun (born 1953) becomes the world no. 1. | Cho Hunhyun |
| 1984 | Nie Weiping (1952–2026) leads China to victory over Japan in the first China–Japan Super Go Matches, a national triumph. | Nie Weiping |
| 1984 | The first computer Go event, the Acornsoft tournament for the BBC Micro, is held. Greg Hale writes inetgo, probably the first program to play Go over the internet. | A BBC Micro |
| 1985 | The Ing Prize for computer programs starts; it expires in 2000, when the last challenge was won by HandTalk at an 11-stone handicap against a young professional. | |
| 1988 | Takemiya Masaki (born 1951) wins the first Fujitsu Cup, one of the first international tournaments. | Takemiya Masaki |
| 1989 | Cho Hunhyun, the only Korean entrant, wins the first Ing Cup, the "Olympics of Go", beating Nie Weiping. | Cho Hunhyun Nie Weiping |
| October 1990 | (South Korea) Lee Changho (born 1975), a student of Cho Hunhyun, becomes the world no. 1 at 15 years old. | Lee Changho |
| 2 February 1992 | The Internet Go Server (IGS), the first server dedicated to Go, starts. | |
| 1993 | Bruegmann's Gobble is the first Go program based on random playouts (Monte Carlo). | |
| 1995 | Ma Xiaochun (born 1964) is the first Chinese player to win an international tournament, taking both the Fujitsu Cup and the Tongyang Securities Cup. | |
| 1996 | Lee Changho wins the first LG Cup. | |
| 1996 | Astronauts Daniel Barry (born 1953) and Koichi Wakata (born 1963) become the first people to play Go in space. | Daniel Barry Koichi Wakata |
| 1998–2003 | The manga Hikaru no Go (later also an anime) sparks a Go boom among young players in Japan. | |
| 2000 | Rui Naiwei (born 1963), playing for Korea, wins the 43rd Kuksu in February and becomes the first woman to win a major title. | Rui Naiwei |
| 2000 | The American Michael Redmond (born 1963) is the first Westerner to reach 9 dan. | Michael Redmond in 2018 |
| 2003 | The Oteai promotion system is discontinued in Japan and a new one introduced. | |
| January 2006 | (China) Gu Li (born 1983) becomes the world no. 1. | Gu Li |
| 2006 | The UCT algorithm, a Monte Carlo tree search, is developed; a program using it, CrazyStone, wins the Computer Olympiad 9×9 Go event the same year. | |
| July 2006 | (South Korea) Lee Sedol (born 1983) becomes the world no. 1. | Lee Sedol |
| 2008 | MoGo wins one of three games against the professional Catalin Taranu on 9×9 and later beats an 8-dan Korean professional on 19×19 with a 9-stone handicap. | |
| 2011–2014 | The American Go Association signs an agreement with the Korean Baduk Association to promote its own professional system (2011); the European Go Federation creates its own (2014). | |
| July 2011 | (South Korea) Park Junghwan (born 1993) becomes the world no. 1. | Park Junghwan |
| 2012 | The program Zen beats Takemiya Masaki in games with 5 and 4 handicap stones. | Takemiya Masaki |
| May 2015 | (China) Ke Jie (born 1997) becomes the world no. 1. | Ke Jie |
The AI era
| October 2015 | AlphaGo, made by Google's DeepMind, beats the European champion Fan Hui (2p) 5–0 in even games: the first time a program beats a professional. | An AlphaGo computer rack Logo of AlphaGo Logo of DeepMind Fan Hui |
| 2016 | DeepMind's AlphaGo beats Lee Sedol (born 1983) 4–1 in Seoul, the first time an AI beats a top professional. The same year, Iyama Yūta (born 1989) holds all seven Japanese major titles at once. | Lee Sedol in 2016 Iyama Yūta |
| Late 2016 – early 2017 | A stronger version of DeepMind's AlphaGo ("Master") wins 60 games in a row, anonymously, online against top professionals. | Logo of AlphaGo |
| May 2017 | DeepMind's new and much improved AlphaGo plays Ke Jie (born 1997) and wins all three games; Ke Jie says its play is "like a god of Go". | Ke Jie Logo of AlphaGo |
| August 2017 | (South Korea) Park Junghwan (born 1993) becomes the world no. 1 for the second time. | |
| May 2018 | (South Korea) Shin Jinseo (born 2000), whose style resembles that of the AIs, becomes the world no. 1. | |
| 2019 | The open-source Go AI KataGo is created by David Wu. | A game analysed with KataGo |
| 2019 | Lee Sedol announces his retirement, citing AlphaGo as "an entity that cannot be defeated". | Lee Sedol |
| 2026 | Shin Jinseo defeats a new version of KataGo on a 2-stone handicap, coming back from a first-game defeat to win the next two. | |

== World no. 1 players ==
The data on who became the world no. 1, and when, comes from Go Ratings.

1. January 1950
  (China) (Japan) Go Seigen (1914–2014) becomes the world no. 1.
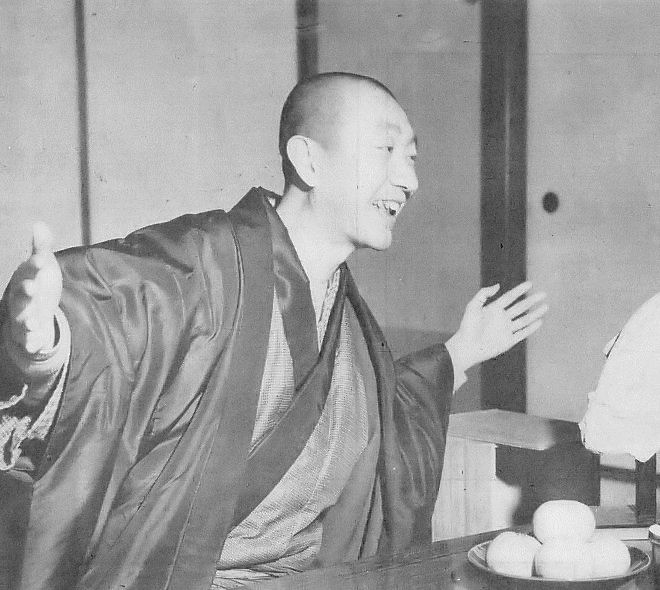
  Go Seigen
2. January 1959
  (Japan) Sakata Eio (1920–2010) becomes the world no. 1.
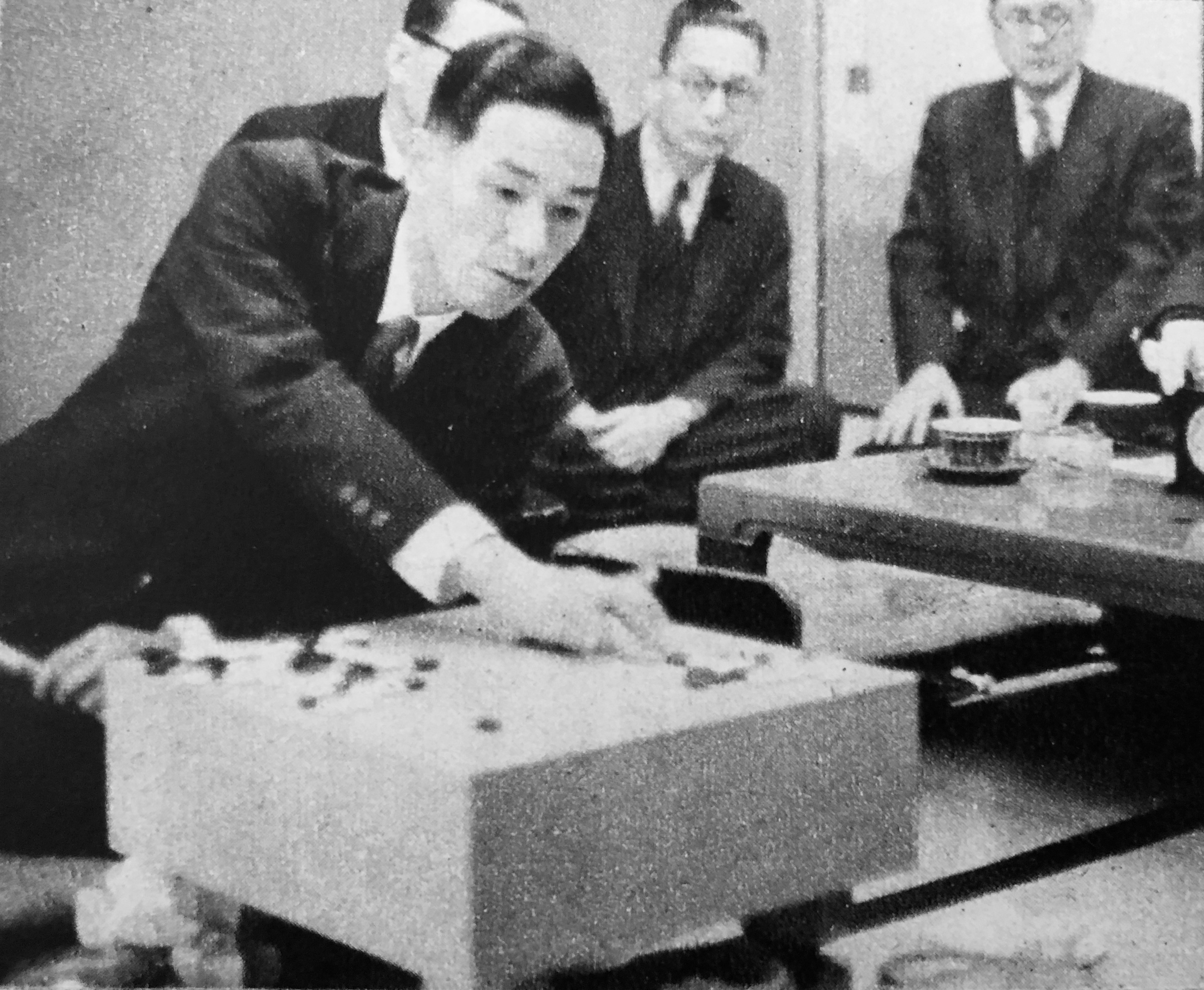
  Sakata Eio
3. January 1969
  (Taiwan) (Japan) Rin Kaiho (born 1942) becomes the world no. 1.
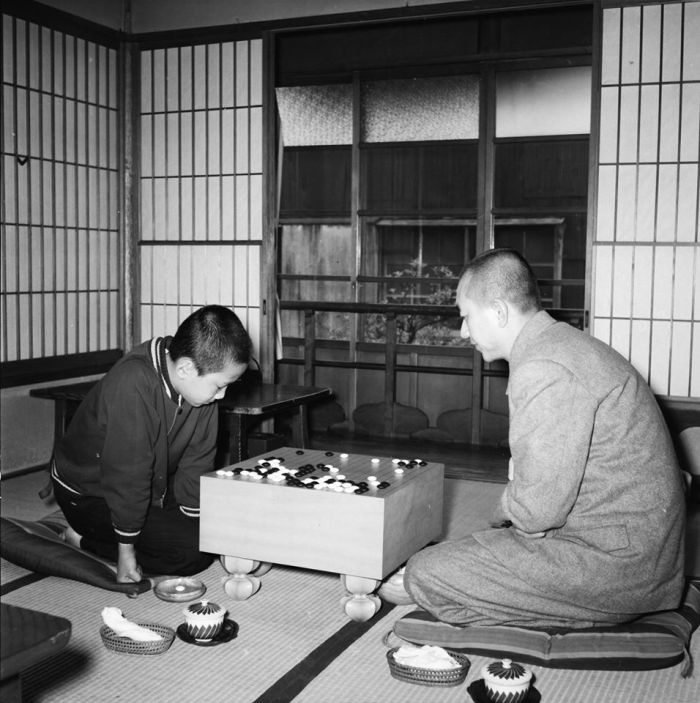
  Go Seigen teaching a young Rin Kaiho
4. June 1975
  (Japan) Kato Masao (1947–2004) becomes the world no. 1.
5. November 1979
  (South Korea) (Japan) Cho Chikun (born 1956) becomes the world no. 1.
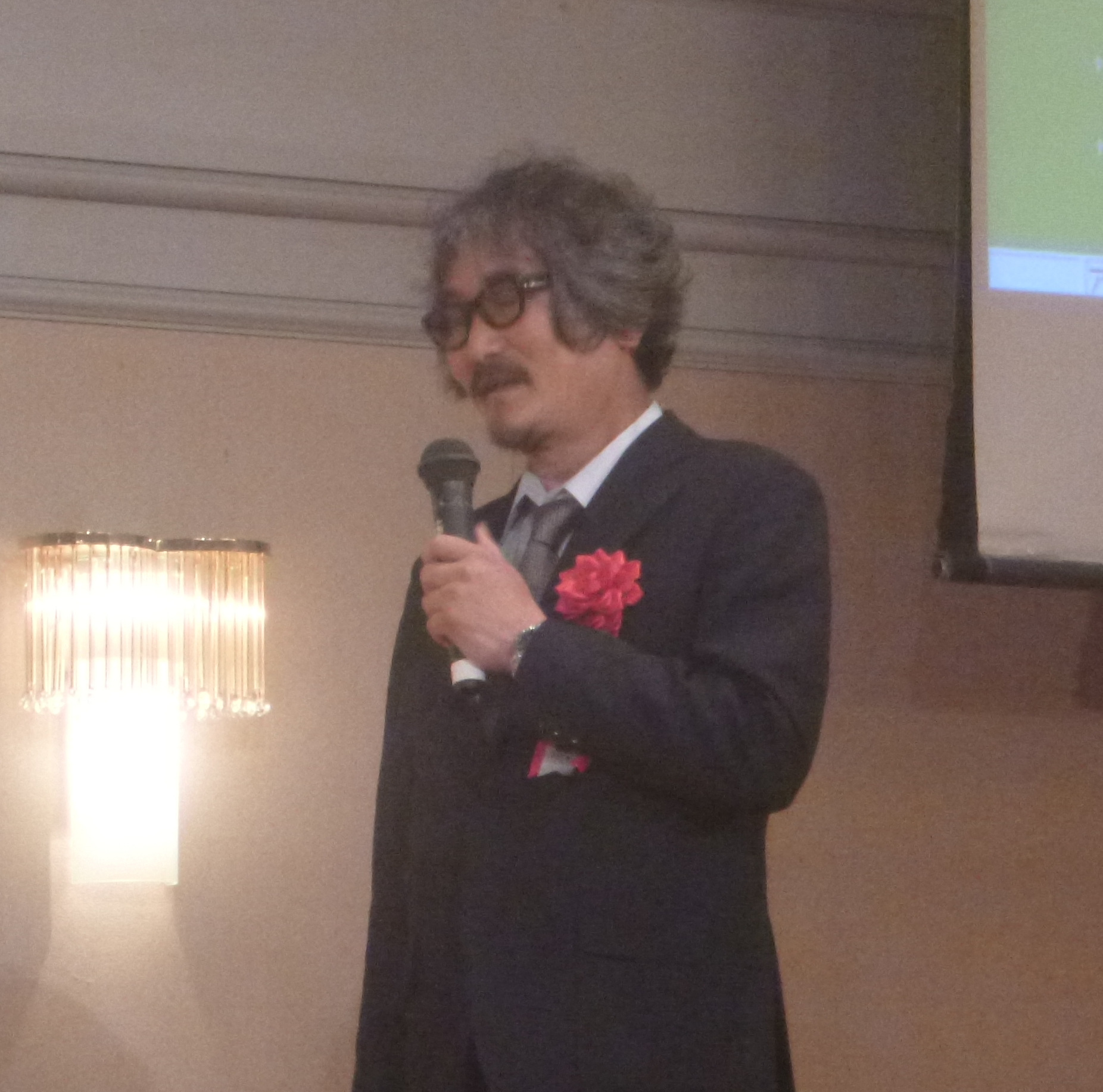
  Cho Chikun
6. July 1982
  (South Korea) Cho Hunhyun (born 1953) becomes the world no. 1.
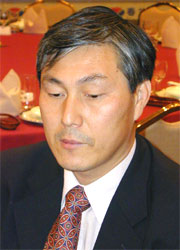
  Cho Hunhyun
7. October 1990
  (South Korea) Lee Changho (born 1975), a student of Cho Hunhyun, becomes the world no. 1 at 15 years old.
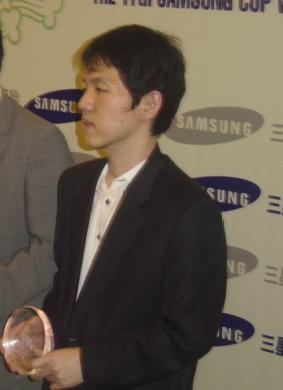
  Lee Changho
8. January 2006
  (China) Gu Li (born 1983) becomes the world no. 1.
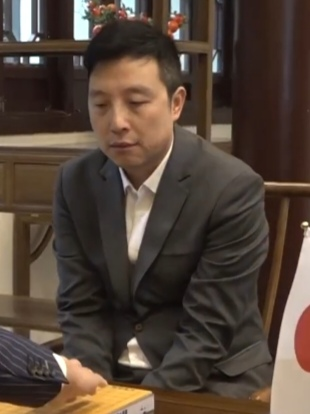
  Gu Li
9. July 2006
  (South Korea) Lee Sedol (born 1983) becomes the world no. 1.
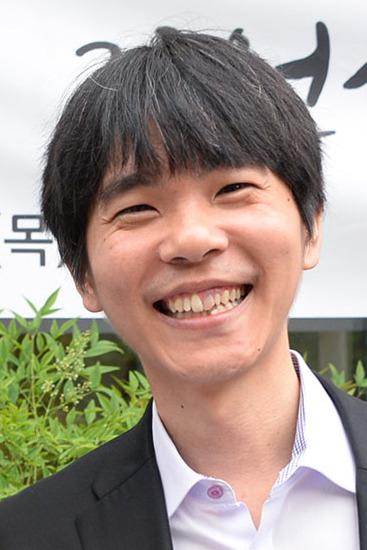
  Lee Sedol
10. July 2011
  (South Korea) Park Junghwan (born 1993) becomes the world no. 1.
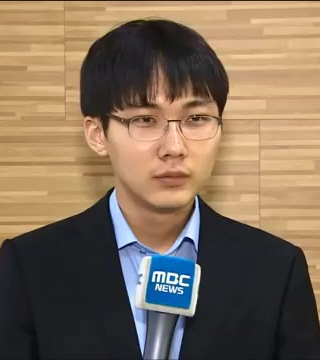
  Park Junghwan
11. May 2015
  (China) Ke Jie (born 1997) becomes the world no. 1.
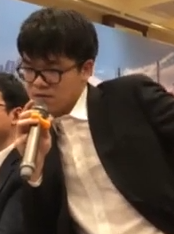
  Ke Jie
12. August 2017
  (South Korea) Park Junghwan becomes the world no. 1 for the second time.
13. May 2018
  (South Korea) Shin Jinseo (born 2000), whose style resembles that of the AIs, becomes the world no. 1.
- January 1950 – (China) (Japan) Go Seigen (1914–2014) becomes the world no. 1.
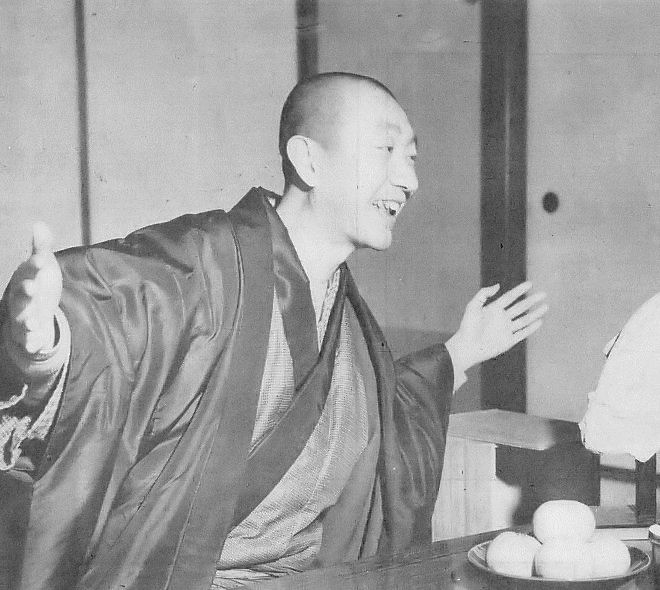
  Go Seigen
- January 1959 – (Japan) Sakata Eio (1920–2010) becomes the world no. 1.
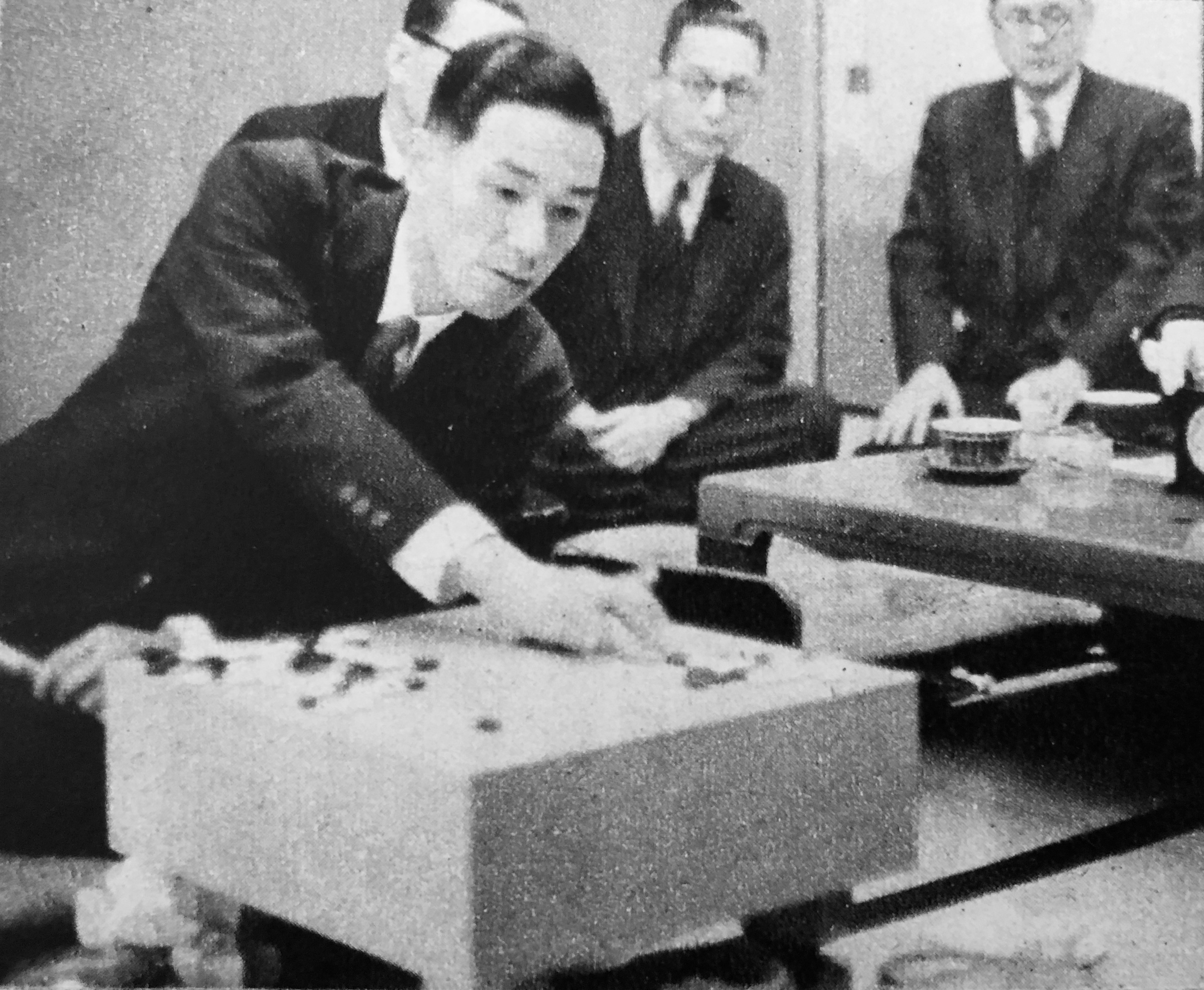
  Sakata Eio
- January 1969 – (Taiwan) (Japan) Rin Kaiho (born 1942) becomes the world no. 1.
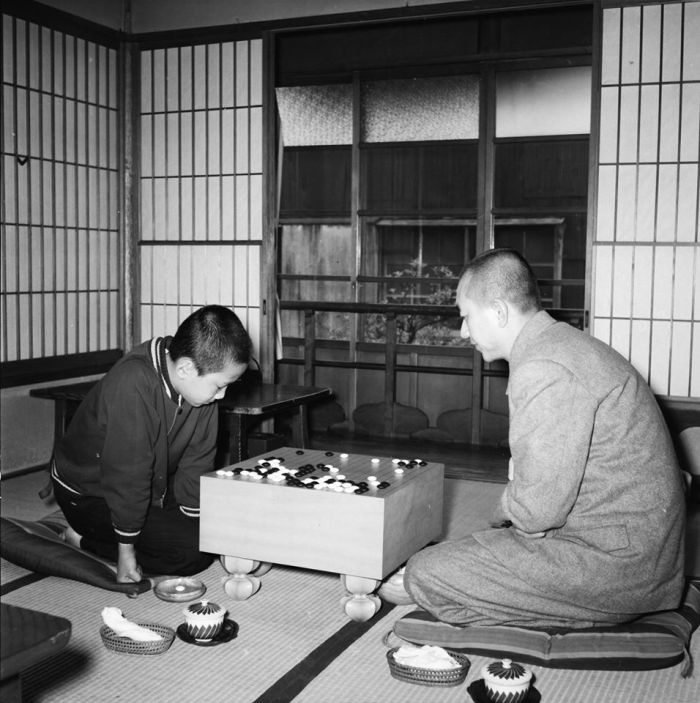
  Go Seigen teaching a young Rin Kaiho
- June 1975 – (Japan) Kato Masao (1947–2004) becomes the world no. 1.
- November 1979 – (South Korea) (Japan) Cho Chikun (born 1956) becomes the world no. 1.
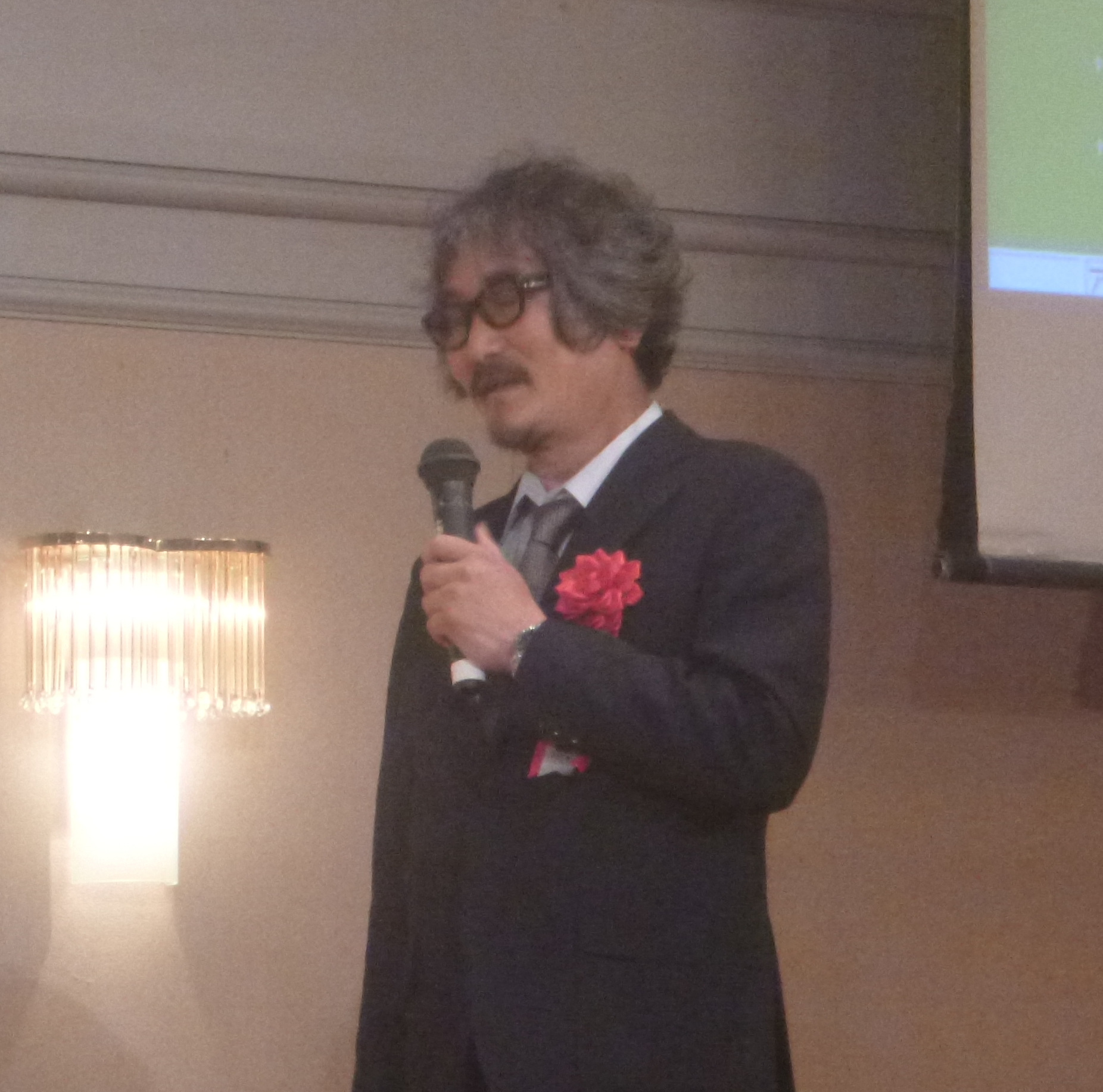
  Cho Chikun
- July 1982 – (South Korea) Cho Hunhyun (born 1953) becomes the world no. 1.
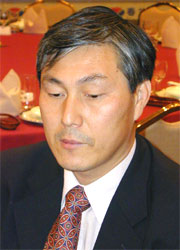
  Cho Hunhyun
- October 1990 – (South Korea) Lee Changho (born 1975), a student of Cho Hunhyun, becomes the world no. 1 at 15 years old.
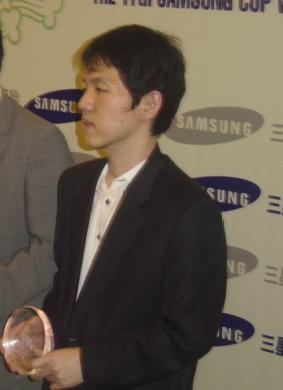
  Lee Changho
- January 2006 – (China) Gu Li (born 1983) becomes the world no. 1.
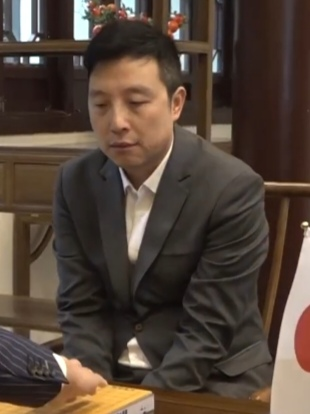
  Gu Li
- July 2006 – (South Korea) Lee Sedol (born 1983) becomes the world no. 1.
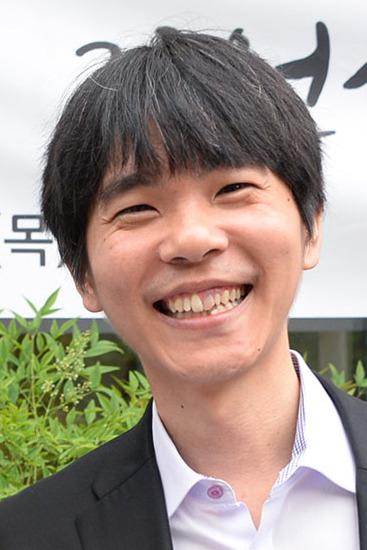
  Lee Sedol
- July 2011 – (South Korea) Park Junghwan (born 1993) becomes the world no. 1.
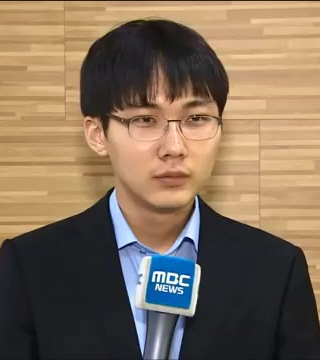
  Park Junghwan
- May 2015 – (China) Ke Jie (born 1997) becomes the world no. 1.
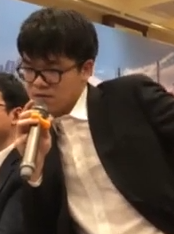
  Ke Jie
- August 2017 – (South Korea) Park Junghwan becomes the world no. 1 for the second time.
- May 2018 – (South Korea) Shin Jinseo (born 2000), whose style resembles that of the AIs, becomes the world no. 1.

| Date | Description | Image |
|---|---|---|
| January 1950 | (China) (Japan) Go Seigen (1914–2014) becomes the world no. 1. | Go Seigen |
| January 1959 | (Japan) Sakata Eio (1920–2010) becomes the world no. 1. | Sakata Eio |
| January 1969 | (Taiwan) (Japan) Rin Kaiho (born 1942) becomes the world no. 1. | Go Seigen teaching a young Rin Kaiho |
| June 1975 | (Japan) Kato Masao (1947–2004) becomes the world no. 1. | |
| November 1979 | (South Korea) (Japan) Cho Chikun (born 1956) becomes the world no. 1. | Cho Chikun |
| July 1982 | (South Korea) Cho Hunhyun (born 1953) becomes the world no. 1. | Cho Hunhyun |
| October 1990 | (South Korea) Lee Changho (born 1975), a student of Cho Hunhyun, becomes the world no. 1 at 15 years old. | Lee Changho |
| January 2006 | (China) Gu Li (born 1983) becomes the world no. 1. | Gu Li |
| July 2006 | (South Korea) Lee Sedol (born 1983) becomes the world no. 1. | Lee Sedol |
| July 2011 | (South Korea) Park Junghwan (born 1993) becomes the world no. 1. | Park Junghwan |
| May 2015 | (China) Ke Jie (born 1997) becomes the world no. 1. | Ke Jie |
| August 2017 | (South Korea) Park Junghwan becomes the world no. 1 for the second time. | |
| May 2018 | (South Korea) Shin Jinseo (born 2000), whose style resembles that of the AIs, becomes the world no. 1. | |

== Go in China ==
1. Legends and first records
  1. Unknown
    The "Rotten Handle" legend of the origin of the game: a carpenter in Zhejiang watches deities playing a mysterious game and loses track of time.
  2. c. 2356–2255 BCE
    According to legend, Emperor Yao creates the game to teach discipline and balance to his son Danzhu. Another legend has Shun, his successor, invent it for his own son.
  3. 548 BCE
    The earliest written reference to the game is usually taken to be the historical annal Zuo Zhuan, about an event of this year; it is also mentioned in the Analects of Confucius (c. 551 – c. 479 BCE) and in the books of Mencius (c. 371 – c. 289 BCE).
  4. 3rd century BCE
    Mencius mentions a famous player called Yi Qiu.
  5. 206 BCE – 24 CE
    Western Han: a broken piece of a pottery board, the earliest board found in China, is later unearthed in Shaanxi.
  6. 1st–3rd century
    Eastern Han: Ban Gu (32–92) writes Yì Zhǐ ("The Essentials of Go"), the oldest surviving text devoted to Go, and boards have 17 × 17 lines.
  7. c. 250
    The "Wu Diagrams" record the earliest known game of Go.
2. Ancient and medieval East Asia
  1. 3rd–6th century
    The board grows from 17 × 17 to 19 × 19 lines. The Dunhuang Go Manual, the first book devoted to Go on the larger board, dates to this period.
  2. Around 500
    Emperor Wu of Liang (464–549) promotes the game and holds the first documented national tournament; 278 players receive a rank.
  3. 618–907
    Tang dynasty: the court creates the post of Go attendant ("Qídàizhào") for players who play against the emperor, and players are ranked. Wang Jixin is credited with the "Ten Golden Rules of Go".
  4. Early 8th century
    The game reaches Tibet and Mongolia, where the 17 × 17 board survives.
  5. 737
    The Chinese player Yang Jiying travels to Korea as an envoy and no player of Silla (57 BCE – 935) can match him.
  6. c. 1050
    Song dynasty (960–1279): a major treatise in thirteen chapters, the Classic of Go (Qíjīng Shísān Piān), is written; the Song era also produces many other treatises on strategy.
  7. c. 1100
    The Wangyou Qingle Ji, compiled by Li Yimin, is the oldest surviving Go book. It collects essays, old game records and the first set of tsumego problems, among them a game between a Japanese prince and Gu Shiyan, the first recorded double-ladder breaker.
  8. 1349
    Yuan dynasty (1271–1368): Yan Defu and Yan Tianzhang compile the Xuanxuan Qijing ("Gateway to All Marvels"), six volumes with 376 problems, essays and game records; it inspires problem books around the world.
  9. Ming dynasty
    Chinese scoring changes from territory to stone scoring. The Hongwu Emperor (1328–1398) issues an "Edict Banning Weiqi" in the face of widespread gambling on the game.
3. Edo-period Japan and Qing China
  1. 1615
    Nicolas Trigault (1577–1628) publishes in Augsburg the diaries of the Jesuit Matteo Ricci (1552–1610), which explain the game of weiqi; the book goes through at least 16 editions in European languages.
  2. c. 1650
    Huang Longshi, probably the strongest Chinese player of the Qing dynasty (1644–1912), is born (c. 1650 – c. 1694).
  3. 1739
    Shi Xiangxia and Fan Xiping play the "Ten Games at Danghu" in Pinghu, Zhejiang.
4. Modern professional Go
  1. 1909–1910
    The Japanese professional Takabe Dōhei (1881–1951) visits China and introduces play without fixed starting stones.
  2. 1950
    Go Seigen (1914–2014) is awarded 9 dan, and becomes the world's best player; he wins his ten-game matches against all top rivals until 1956.
  3. January 1950
    (China) (Japan) Go Seigen becomes the world no. 1.
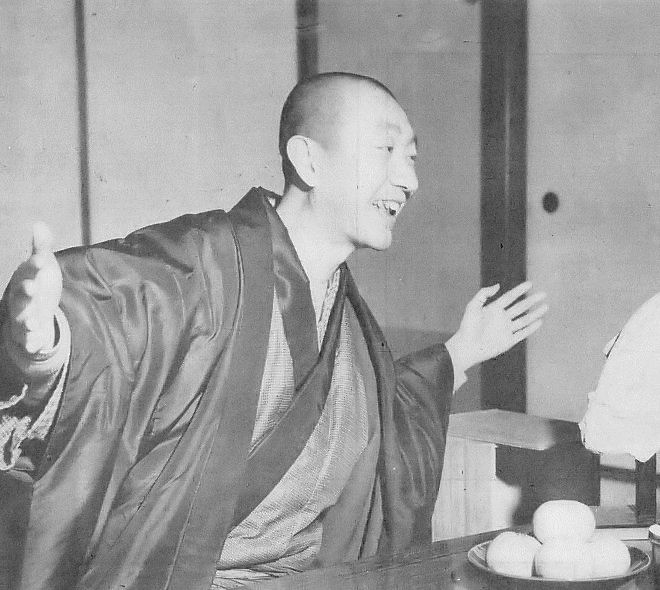
    Go Seigen
  4. 1960
    The China–Japan Go Friendship Match starts; it is held every year until 1991.
  5. 1984
    Nie Weiping (1952–2026) leads China to victory over Japan in the first China–Japan Super Go Matches, a national triumph.
  6. 1989
    Cho Hunhyun (born 1953), the only Korean entrant, wins the first Ing Cup, the "Olympics of Go", beating Nie Weiping.
  7. 1995
    Ma Xiaochun (born 1964) is the first Chinese player to win an international tournament, taking both the Fujitsu Cup and the Tongyang Securities Cup.
  8. 2000
    Rui Naiwei (born 1963), playing for Korea, wins the 43rd Kuksu in February and becomes the first woman to win a major title.
  9. January 2006
    (China) Gu Li (born 1983) becomes the world no. 1.
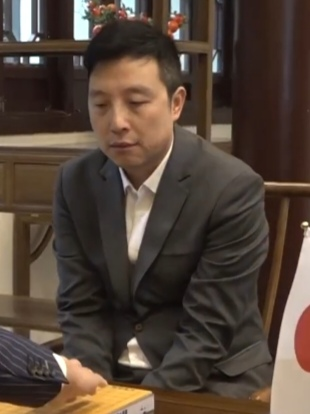
    Gu Li
  10. May 2015
    (China) Ke Jie (born 1997) becomes the world no. 1.
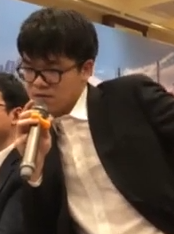
    Ke Jie
  11. May 2017
    DeepMind's new and much improved AlphaGo plays Ke Jie and wins all three games; Ke Jie says its play is "like a god of Go".

Legends and first records

- Unknown – The "Rotten Handle" legend of the origin of the game: a carpenter in Zhejiang watches deities playing a mysterious game and loses track of time.
- c. 2356–2255 BCE – According to legend, Emperor Yao creates the game to teach discipline and balance to his son Danzhu. Another legend has Shun, his successor, invent it for his own son.
- 548 BCE – The earliest written reference to the game is usually taken to be the historical annal Zuo Zhuan, about an event of this year; it is also mentioned in the Analects of Confucius (c. 551 – c. 479 BCE) and in the books of Mencius (c. 371 – c. 289 BCE).
- 3rd century BCE – Mencius mentions a famous player called Yi Qiu.
- 206 BCE – 24 CE – Western Han: a broken piece of a pottery board, the earliest board found in China, is later unearthed in Shaanxi.
- 1st–3rd century – Eastern Han: Ban Gu (32–92) writes Yì Zhǐ ("The Essentials of Go"), the oldest surviving text devoted to Go, and boards have 17 × 17 lines.
- c. 250 – The "Wu Diagrams" record the earliest known game of Go.

Ancient and medieval East Asia

- 3rd–6th century – The board grows from 17 × 17 to 19 × 19 lines. The Dunhuang Go Manual, the first book devoted to Go on the larger board, dates to this period.
- Around 500 – Emperor Wu of Liang (464–549) promotes the game and holds the first documented national tournament; 278 players receive a rank.
- 618–907 – Tang dynasty: the court creates the post of Go attendant ("Qídàizhào") for players who play against the emperor, and players are ranked. Wang Jixin is credited with the "Ten Golden Rules of Go".
- Early 8th century – The game reaches Tibet and Mongolia, where the 17 × 17 board survives.
- 737 – The Chinese player Yang Jiying travels to Korea as an envoy and no player of Silla (57 BCE – 935) can match him.
- c. 1050 – Song dynasty (960–1279): a major treatise in thirteen chapters, the Classic of Go (Qíjīng Shísān Piān), is written; the Song era also produces many other treatises on strategy.
- c. 1100 – The Wangyou Qingle Ji, compiled by Li Yimin, is the oldest surviving Go book. It collects essays, old game records and the first set of tsumego problems, among them a game between a Japanese prince and Gu Shiyan, the first recorded double-ladder breaker.
- 1349 – Yuan dynasty (1271–1368): Yan Defu and Yan Tianzhang compile the Xuanxuan Qijing ("Gateway to All Marvels"), six volumes with 376 problems, essays and game records; it inspires problem books around the world.
- Ming dynasty – Chinese scoring changes from territory to stone scoring. The Hongwu Emperor (1328–1398) issues an "Edict Banning Weiqi" in the face of widespread gambling on the game.

Edo-period Japan and Qing China

- 1615 – Nicolas Trigault (1577–1628) publishes in Augsburg the diaries of the Jesuit Matteo Ricci (1552–1610), which explain the game of weiqi; the book goes through at least 16 editions in European languages.
- c. 1650 – Huang Longshi, probably the strongest Chinese player of the Qing dynasty (1644–1912), is born (c. 1650 – c. 1694).
- 1739 – Shi Xiangxia and Fan Xiping play the "Ten Games at Danghu" in Pinghu, Zhejiang.

Modern professional Go

- 1909–1910 – The Japanese professional Takabe Dōhei (1881–1951) visits China and introduces play without fixed starting stones.
- 1950 – Go Seigen (1914–2014) is awarded 9 dan, and becomes the world's best player; he wins his ten-game matches against all top rivals until 1956.
- January 1950 – (China) (Japan) Go Seigen becomes the world no. 1.
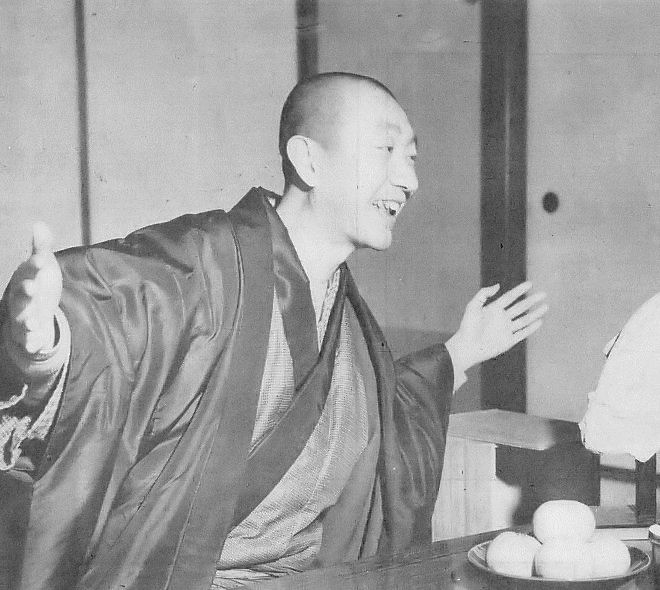
  Go Seigen
- 1960 – The China–Japan Go Friendship Match starts; it is held every year until 1991.
- 1984 – Nie Weiping (1952–2026) leads China to victory over Japan in the first China–Japan Super Go Matches, a national triumph.
- 1989 – Cho Hunhyun (born 1953), the only Korean entrant, wins the first Ing Cup, the "Olympics of Go", beating Nie Weiping.
- 1995 – Ma Xiaochun (born 1964) is the first Chinese player to win an international tournament, taking both the Fujitsu Cup and the Tongyang Securities Cup.
- 2000 – Rui Naiwei (born 1963), playing for Korea, wins the 43rd Kuksu in February and becomes the first woman to win a major title.
- January 2006 – (China) Gu Li (born 1983) becomes the world no. 1.
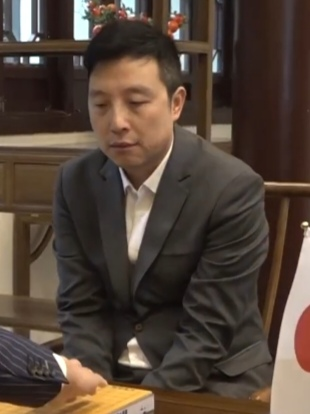
  Gu Li
- May 2015 – (China) Ke Jie (born 1997) becomes the world no. 1.
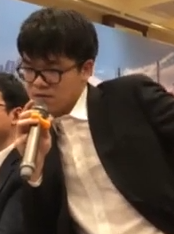
  Ke Jie
- May 2017 – DeepMind's new and much improved AlphaGo plays Ke Jie and wins all three games; Ke Jie says its play is "like a god of Go".

| Date | Description | Image |
Legends and first records
| Unknown | The "Rotten Handle" legend of the origin of the game: a carpenter in Zhejiang watches deities playing a mysterious game and loses track of time. | |
| c. 2356–2255 BCE | According to legend, Emperor Yao creates the game to teach discipline and balance to his son Danzhu. Another legend has Shun, his successor, invent it for his own son. | |
| 548 BCE | The earliest written reference to the game is usually taken to be the historical annal Zuo Zhuan, about an event of this year; it is also mentioned in the Analects of Confucius (c. 551 – c. 479 BCE) and in the books of Mencius (c. 371 – c. 289 BCE). | |
| 3rd century BCE | Mencius mentions a famous player called Yi Qiu. | |
| 206 BCE – 24 CE | Western Han: a broken piece of a pottery board, the earliest board found in China, is later unearthed in Shaanxi. | |
| 1st–3rd century | Eastern Han: Ban Gu (32–92) writes Yì Zhǐ ("The Essentials of Go"), the oldest surviving text devoted to Go, and boards have 17 × 17 lines. | |
| c. 250 | The "Wu Diagrams" record the earliest known game of Go. | |
Ancient and medieval East Asia
| 3rd–6th century | The board grows from 17 × 17 to 19 × 19 lines. The Dunhuang Go Manual, the first book devoted to Go on the larger board, dates to this period. | |
| Around 500 | Emperor Wu of Liang (464–549) promotes the game and holds the first documented national tournament; 278 players receive a rank. | |
| 618–907 | Tang dynasty: the court creates the post of Go attendant ("Qídàizhào") for players who play against the emperor, and players are ranked. Wang Jixin is credited with the "Ten Golden Rules of Go". | |
| Early 8th century | The game reaches Tibet and Mongolia, where the 17 × 17 board survives. | |
| 737 | The Chinese player Yang Jiying travels to Korea as an envoy and no player of Silla (57 BCE – 935) can match him. | |
| c. 1050 | Song dynasty (960–1279): a major treatise in thirteen chapters, the Classic of Go (Qíjīng Shísān Piān), is written; the Song era also produces many other treatises on strategy. | |
| c. 1100 | The Wangyou Qingle Ji, compiled by Li Yimin, is the oldest surviving Go book. It collects essays, old game records and the first set of tsumego problems, among them a game between a Japanese prince and Gu Shiyan, the first recorded double-ladder breaker. | |
| 1349 | Yuan dynasty (1271–1368): Yan Defu and Yan Tianzhang compile the Xuanxuan Qijing ("Gateway to All Marvels"), six volumes with 376 problems, essays and game records; it inspires problem books around the world. | |
| Ming dynasty | Chinese scoring changes from territory to stone scoring. The Hongwu Emperor (1328–1398) issues an "Edict Banning Weiqi" in the face of widespread gambling on the game. | |
Edo-period Japan and Qing China
| 1615 | Nicolas Trigault (1577–1628) publishes in Augsburg the diaries of the Jesuit Matteo Ricci (1552–1610), which explain the game of weiqi; the book goes through at least 16 editions in European languages. | |
| c. 1650 | Huang Longshi, probably the strongest Chinese player of the Qing dynasty (1644–1912), is born (c. 1650 – c. 1694). | |
| 1739 | Shi Xiangxia and Fan Xiping play the "Ten Games at Danghu" in Pinghu, Zhejiang. | |
Modern professional Go
| 1909–1910 | The Japanese professional Takabe Dōhei (1881–1951) visits China and introduces play without fixed starting stones. | |
| 1950 | Go Seigen (1914–2014) is awarded 9 dan, and becomes the world's best player; he wins his ten-game matches against all top rivals until 1956. | |
| January 1950 | (China) (Japan) Go Seigen becomes the world no. 1. | Go Seigen |
| 1960 | The China–Japan Go Friendship Match starts; it is held every year until 1991. | |
| 1984 | Nie Weiping (1952–2026) leads China to victory over Japan in the first China–Japan Super Go Matches, a national triumph. | |
| 1989 | Cho Hunhyun (born 1953), the only Korean entrant, wins the first Ing Cup, the "Olympics of Go", beating Nie Weiping. | |
| 1995 | Ma Xiaochun (born 1964) is the first Chinese player to win an international tournament, taking both the Fujitsu Cup and the Tongyang Securities Cup. | |
| 2000 | Rui Naiwei (born 1963), playing for Korea, wins the 43rd Kuksu in February and becomes the first woman to win a major title. | |
| January 2006 | (China) Gu Li (born 1983) becomes the world no. 1. | Gu Li |
| May 2015 | (China) Ke Jie (born 1997) becomes the world no. 1. | Ke Jie |
| May 2017 | DeepMind's new and much improved AlphaGo plays Ke Jie and wins all three games; Ke Jie says its play is "like a god of Go". | |

== Go in Korea ==
1. Ancient and medieval East Asia
  1. 475
    In the rivalry between Goguryeo (37 BCE – 668) and Baekje (18 BCE – 660), the Goguryeo priest To-lim uses the game of Go to spy on King Yogyong; the invasion of Baekje follows.
  2. 737
    The Chinese player Yang Jiying travels to Korea as an envoy and no player of Silla (57 BCE – 935) can match him.
2. Modern professional Go
  1. 1954
    The Korea Baduk Association (Hankuk Kiwon) is established, on 28 January. The first NHK Cup is broadcast on radio; it moves to television in 1962.
  2. 1956
    The first professional tournament in Korea, the Kuksu Cup, starts.
  3. November 1979
    (South Korea) (Japan) Cho Chikun (born 1956) becomes the world no. 1.
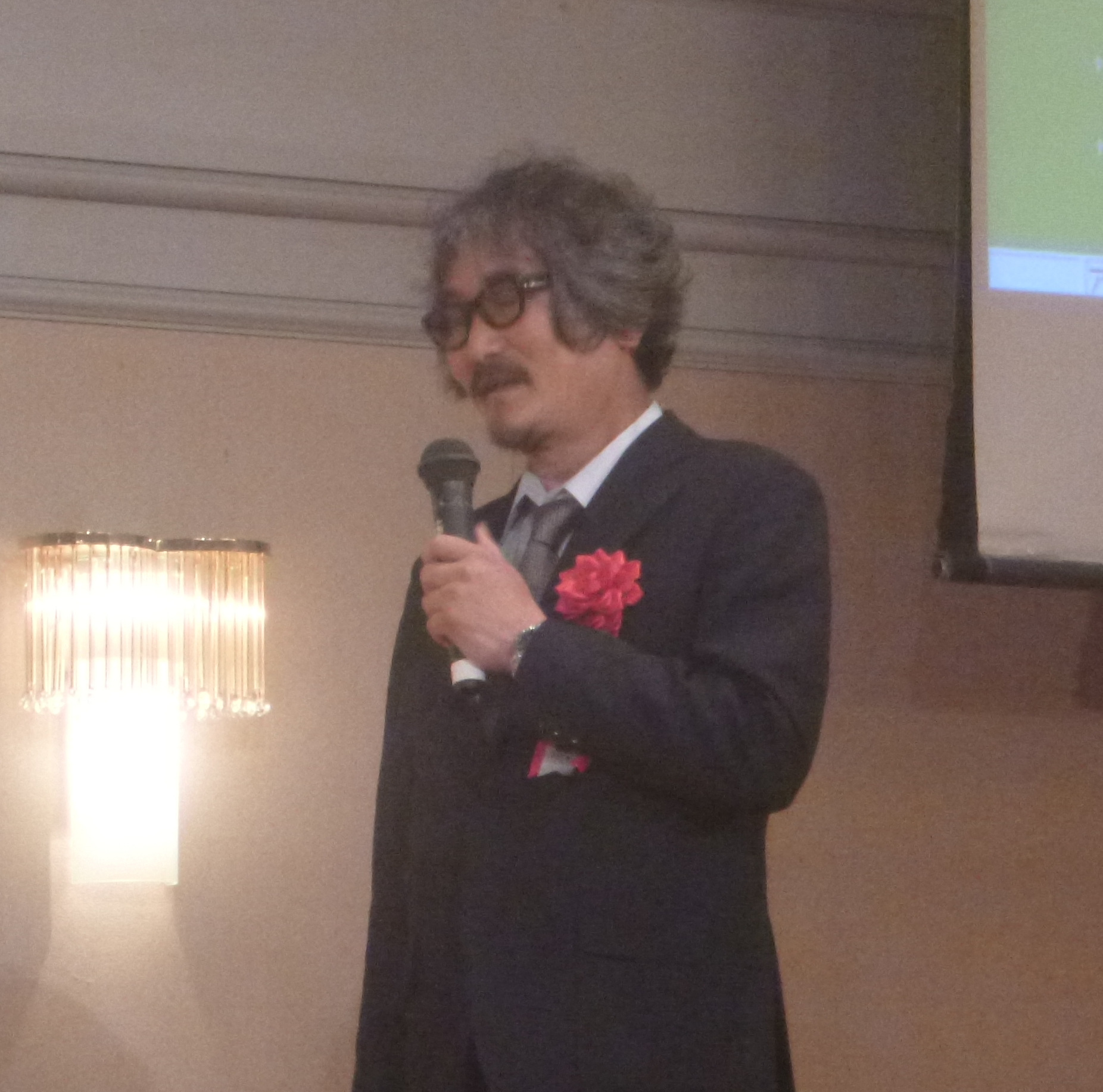
    Cho Chikun
  4. July 1982
    (South Korea) Cho Hunhyun (born 1953) becomes the world no. 1.
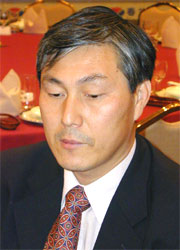
    Cho Hunhyun
  5. 1989
    Cho Hunhyun, the only Korean entrant, wins the first Ing Cup, the "Olympics of Go", beating Nie Weiping (1952–2026).
  6. October 1990
    (South Korea) Lee Changho (born 1975), a student of Cho Hunhyun, becomes the world no. 1 at 15 years old.
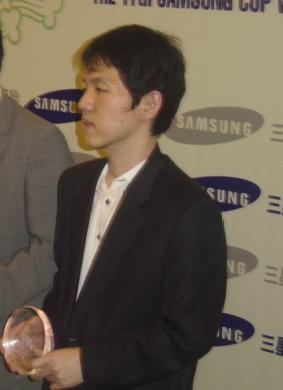
    Lee Changho
  7. 1996
    Lee Changho wins the first LG Cup.
  8. 2000
    Rui Naiwei (born 1963), playing for Korea, wins the 43rd Kuksu in February and becomes the first woman to win a major title.
  9. July 2006
    (South Korea) Lee Sedol (born 1983) becomes the world no. 1.
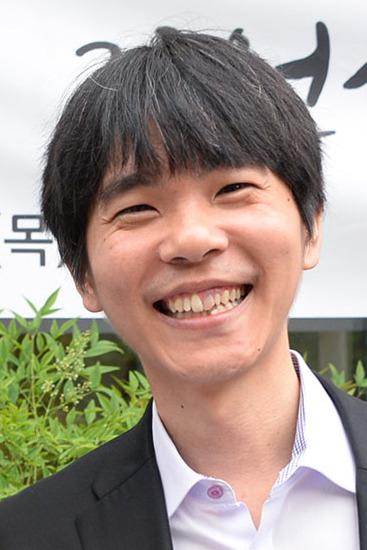
    Lee Sedol
  10. 2011–2014
    The American Go Association signs an agreement with the Korean Baduk Association to promote its own professional system (2011); the European Go Federation creates its own (2014).
  11. July 2011
    (South Korea) Park Junghwan (born 1993) becomes the world no. 1.
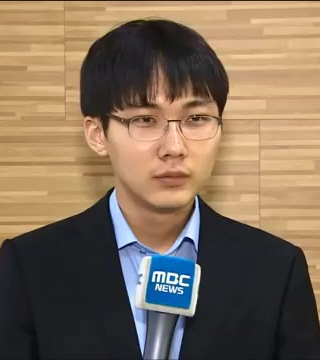
    Park Junghwan
  12. 2016
    DeepMind's AlphaGo beats Lee Sedol 4–1 in Seoul, the first time an AI beats a top professional. The same year, Iyama Yūta (born 1989) holds all seven Japanese major titles at once.
  13. August 2017
    (South Korea) Park Junghwan becomes the world no. 1 for the second time.
  14. May 2018
    (South Korea) Shin Jinseo (born 2000), whose style resembles that of the AIs, becomes the world no. 1.
  15. 2019
    Lee Sedol announces his retirement, citing AlphaGo as "an entity that cannot be defeated".
  16. 2026
    Shin Jinseo defeats a new version of KataGo on a 2-stone handicap, coming back from a first-game defeat to win the next two.

Ancient and medieval East Asia

- 475 – In the rivalry between Goguryeo (37 BCE – 668) and Baekje (18 BCE – 660), the Goguryeo priest To-lim uses the game of Go to spy on King Yogyong; the invasion of Baekje follows.
- 737 – The Chinese player Yang Jiying travels to Korea as an envoy and no player of Silla (57 BCE – 935) can match him.

Modern professional Go

- 1954 – The Korea Baduk Association (Hankuk Kiwon) is established, on 28 January. The first NHK Cup is broadcast on radio; it moves to television in 1962.
- 1956 – The first professional tournament in Korea, the Kuksu Cup, starts.
- November 1979 – (South Korea) (Japan) Cho Chikun (born 1956) becomes the world no. 1.
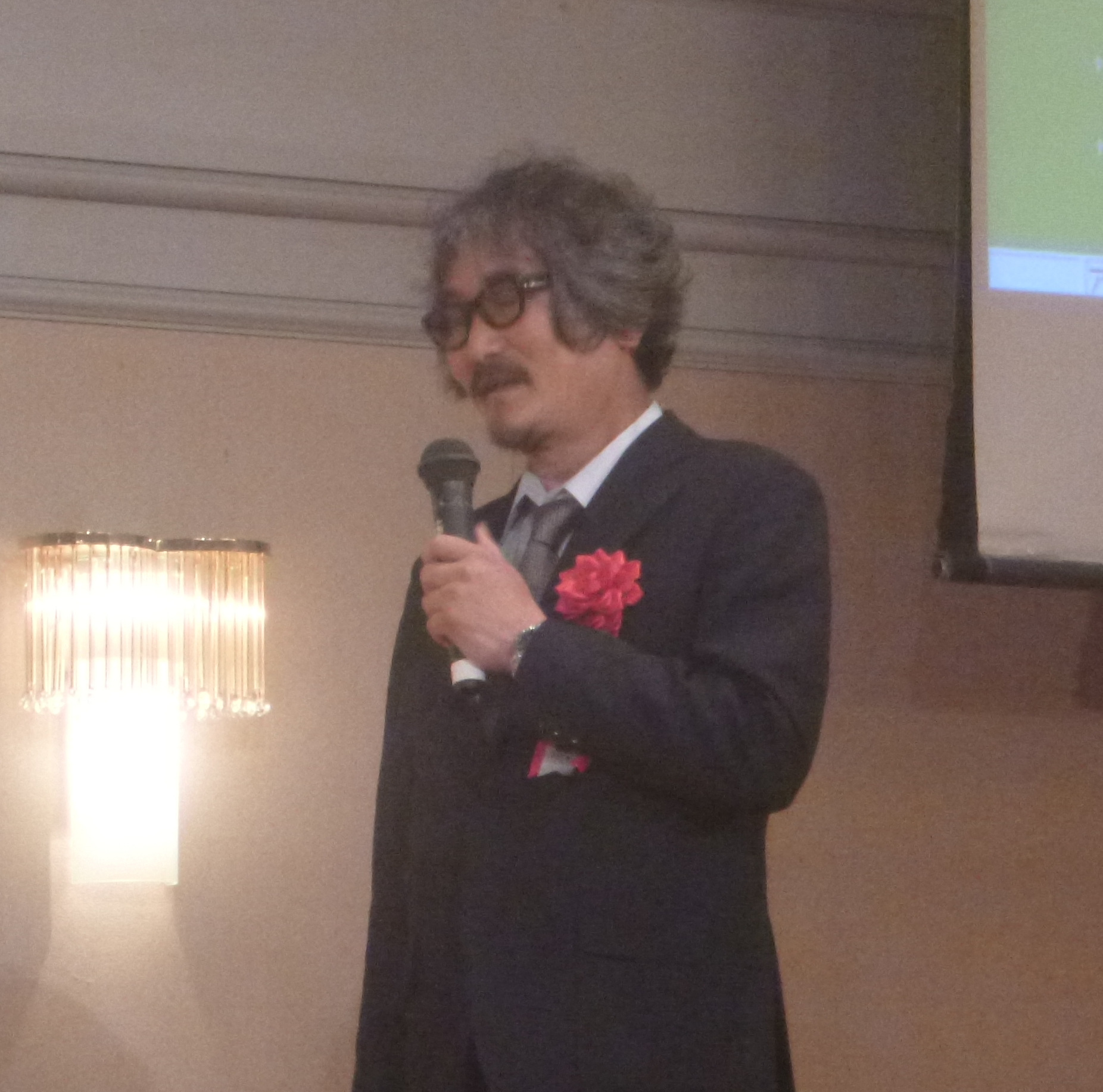
  Cho Chikun
- July 1982 – (South Korea) Cho Hunhyun (born 1953) becomes the world no. 1.
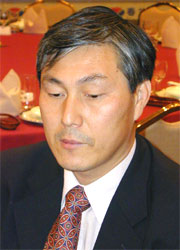
  Cho Hunhyun
- 1989 – Cho Hunhyun, the only Korean entrant, wins the first Ing Cup, the "Olympics of Go", beating Nie Weiping (1952–2026).
- October 1990 – (South Korea) Lee Changho (born 1975), a student of Cho Hunhyun, becomes the world no. 1 at 15 years old.
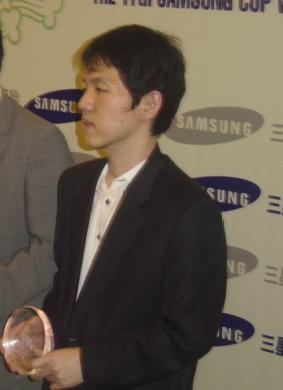
  Lee Changho
- 1996 – Lee Changho wins the first LG Cup.
- 2000 – Rui Naiwei (born 1963), playing for Korea, wins the 43rd Kuksu in February and becomes the first woman to win a major title.
- July 2006 – (South Korea) Lee Sedol (born 1983) becomes the world no. 1.
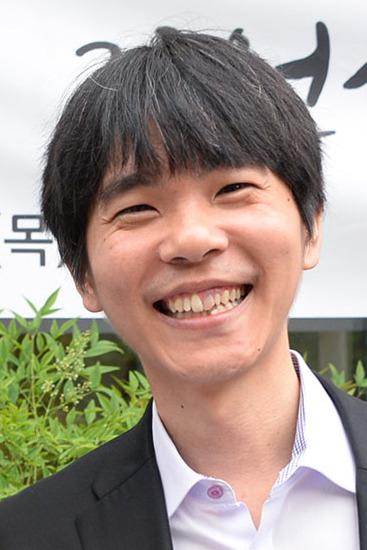
  Lee Sedol
- 2011–2014 – The American Go Association signs an agreement with the Korean Baduk Association to promote its own professional system (2011); the European Go Federation creates its own (2014).
- July 2011 – (South Korea) Park Junghwan (born 1993) becomes the world no. 1.
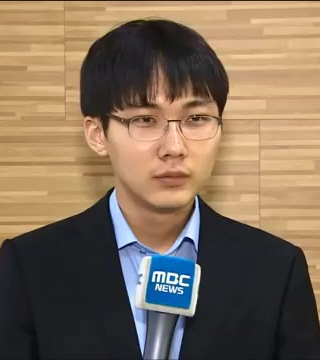
  Park Junghwan
- 2016 – DeepMind's AlphaGo beats Lee Sedol 4–1 in Seoul, the first time an AI beats a top professional. The same year, Iyama Yūta (born 1989) holds all seven Japanese major titles at once.
- August 2017 – (South Korea) Park Junghwan becomes the world no. 1 for the second time.
- May 2018 – (South Korea) Shin Jinseo (born 2000), whose style resembles that of the AIs, becomes the world no. 1.
- 2019 – Lee Sedol announces his retirement, citing AlphaGo as "an entity that cannot be defeated".
- 2026 – Shin Jinseo defeats a new version of KataGo on a 2-stone handicap, coming back from a first-game defeat to win the next two.

| Date | Description | Image |
Ancient and medieval East Asia
| 475 | In the rivalry between Goguryeo (37 BCE – 668) and Baekje (18 BCE – 660), the Goguryeo priest To-lim uses the game of Go to spy on King Yogyong; the invasion of Baekje follows. | |
| 737 | The Chinese player Yang Jiying travels to Korea as an envoy and no player of Silla (57 BCE – 935) can match him. | |
Modern professional Go
| 1954 | The Korea Baduk Association (Hankuk Kiwon) is established, on 28 January. The first NHK Cup is broadcast on radio; it moves to television in 1962. | |
| 1956 | The first professional tournament in Korea, the Kuksu Cup, starts. | |
| November 1979 | (South Korea) (Japan) Cho Chikun (born 1956) becomes the world no. 1. | Cho Chikun |
| July 1982 | (South Korea) Cho Hunhyun (born 1953) becomes the world no. 1. | Cho Hunhyun |
| 1989 | Cho Hunhyun, the only Korean entrant, wins the first Ing Cup, the "Olympics of Go", beating Nie Weiping (1952–2026). | |
| October 1990 | (South Korea) Lee Changho (born 1975), a student of Cho Hunhyun, becomes the world no. 1 at 15 years old. | Lee Changho |
| 1996 | Lee Changho wins the first LG Cup. | |
| 2000 | Rui Naiwei (born 1963), playing for Korea, wins the 43rd Kuksu in February and becomes the first woman to win a major title. | |
| July 2006 | (South Korea) Lee Sedol (born 1983) becomes the world no. 1. | Lee Sedol |
| 2011–2014 | The American Go Association signs an agreement with the Korean Baduk Association to promote its own professional system (2011); the European Go Federation creates its own (2014). | |
| July 2011 | (South Korea) Park Junghwan (born 1993) becomes the world no. 1. | Park Junghwan |
| 2016 | DeepMind's AlphaGo beats Lee Sedol 4–1 in Seoul, the first time an AI beats a top professional. The same year, Iyama Yūta (born 1989) holds all seven Japanese major titles at once. | |
| August 2017 | (South Korea) Park Junghwan becomes the world no. 1 for the second time. | |
| May 2018 | (South Korea) Shin Jinseo (born 2000), whose style resembles that of the AIs, becomes the world no. 1. | |
| 2019 | Lee Sedol announces his retirement, citing AlphaGo as "an entity that cannot be defeated". | |
| 2026 | Shin Jinseo defeats a new version of KataGo on a 2-stone handicap, coming back from a first-game defeat to win the next two. | |

== Go in Japan ==
1. Ancient and medieval East Asia
  1. Early 7th century
    Chinese chronicles (the Records of the Sui) report that the Japanese enjoy Go.
  2. 8th century
    Go reaches Japan, traditionally brought back from the Tang court by Kibi no Makibi (695–775); the Taihō Code of 701 already describes it.
  3. 1582
    Honinbo Sansa (1559–1623) plays a triple ko against Kashio Rigen (1565–?) at a monastery in Kyoto in the presence of Oda Nobunaga (1534–1582); the game is suspended. The next day Nobunaga is killed, and a triple ko is considered bad luck ever after.
  4. 1588
    Toyotomi Hideyoshi (1537–1598) organizes the first Japanese Go tournament; Hon'inbō (Sansa) wins and is granted a salary.
2. Edo-period Japan and Qing China
  1. 1603
    Honinbo Sansa (1559–1623) is appointed by Shogun Tokugawa Ieyasu (1543–1616) as head of the Go world (Meijin Godokoro): the major Japanese Go school system begins.
  2. 1612
    The Tokugawa shogunate (1603–1868) establishes four hereditary Go houses (Hon'inbō, Inoue, Yasui and Hayashi) and pays them stipends; they compete for 250–300 years.
  3. 1626–1628
    The first castle game, played before the shogun, takes place in 1626; in 1628 the castle games become an official yearly ceremony.
  4. 1645–1653
    The first official challenge match (sōgo) to decide the Meijin, between Hon'inbō Sanetsu (1611–1658) and Yasui Sanchi (1617–1703).
  5. Late 17th century
    The fourth Hon'inbō, Dōsaku (1645–1702), defeats every top player of his time and is praised as having "thirteen-dan strength".
  6. 1713
    The Igo Hatsuyoron, a collection of very hard problems, is created.
  7. 1840
    The "blood-vomiting game": Hon'inbō Jōwa (1787–1847) beats Akaboshi Intetsu (1810–1835) in a week-long match; Akaboshi collapses from exhaustion and dies soon after.
  8. 1846
    The "ear-reddening game": Honinbo Shusaku (1829–1862)'s move 127 stuns Gennan Inseki (1798–1859), and becomes one of the best moves of all time.
  9. 1863
    The last castle games are played as the crisis of the shogunate disrupts the ceremonies.
3. Modern professional Go
  1. 1868
    The Meiji Restoration (1866–1869) ends the official stipends of the Go houses; Go loses its patrons and the masters struggle.
  2. 1872
    The first recorded game of Go in Europe is played between Kido Takayoshi (1833–1877) and Ōkubo Toshimichi (1830–1878) of the Iwakura Mission (1871–1873).
  3. 1878
    The first newspaper Go column appears in Japan, on 1 April. In 1879 the Hoensha society forms; its journal Igo Shinpo is the first Go magazine.
  4. 1880
    Oskar Korschelt (1853–1940), who learned the game in Japan from Murase Shūho, publishes Das Go Spiel: the first systematic description in a Western language.
  5. 1909–1910
    The Japanese professional Takabe Dōhei (1881–1951) visits China and introduces play without fixed starting stones.
  6. 1924
    The Nihon Ki-in, Japan's professional Go association, is founded, ending the hereditary house system and inaugurating the modern rank and tournament system.
  7. 1933
    The "Game of the Century": Go Seigen (1914–2014) opens at the three-three, star and center points against Honinbo Shusai (1874–1940), in a controversial three-month game that challenges the old system.
  8. 1935
    A game of Go is broadcast on radio for the first time.
  9. 1936–1938
    Shūsai hands the Hon'inbō title to the Nihon Ki-in (1936) and retires in 1938 after a game against Kitani Minoru (1909–1975) that inspires the novel The Master of Go by Yasunari Kawabata (1899–1972).
  10. 1941
    Sekiyama Riichi (1909–1970) wins the first Hon'inbō title tournament, one of the first major modern tournaments with komi (4.5 points).
  11. 1945
    The "Game Under the Atomic Bomb": the second game of the 3rd Hon'inbō match, played near Hiroshima on August 6, is finished after the blast.
  12. 1949
    Fujisawa Hōsai (1919–1993) becomes the first player to reach 9 dan under the Oteai promotion system.
  13. 1950
    Go Seigen is awarded 9 dan, and becomes the world's best player; he wins his ten-game matches against all top rivals until 1956.
  14. January 1950
    (China) (Japan) Go Seigen becomes the world no. 1.
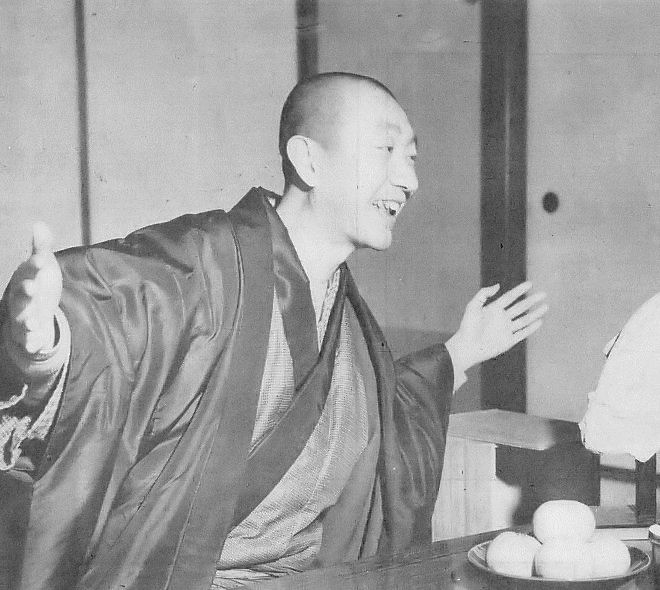
    Go Seigen
  15. 1954
    The Korea Baduk Association (Hankuk Kiwon) is established, on 28 January. The first NHK Cup is broadcast on radio; it moves to television in 1962.
  16. January 1959
    (Japan) Sakata Eio (1920–2010) becomes the world no. 1.
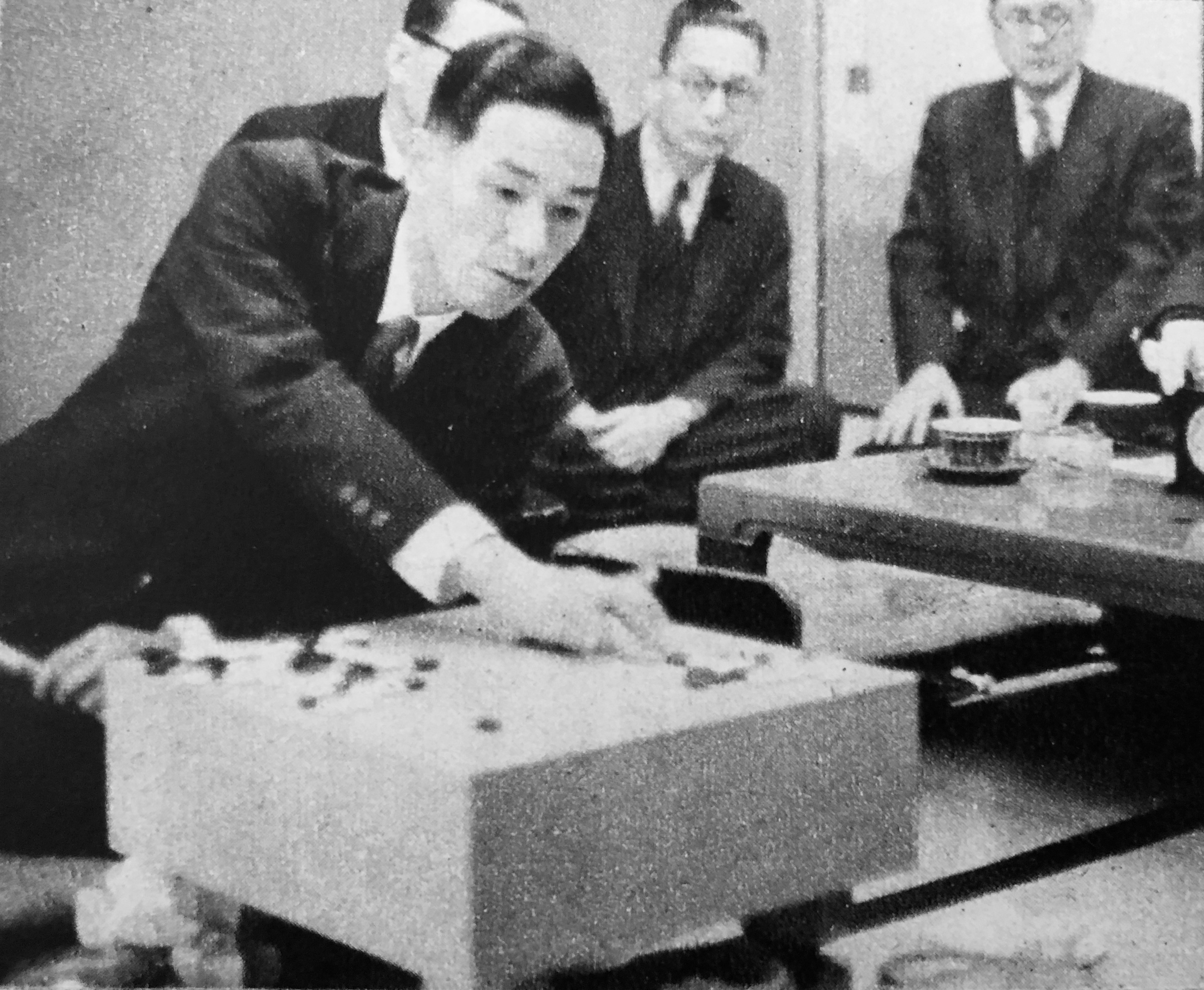
    Sakata Eio
  17. 1960
    The China–Japan Go Friendship Match starts; it is held every year until 1991.
  18. 1962
    Fujisawa Shūkō (1925–2009) wins the first Meijin title tournament.
  19. January 1969
    (Taiwan) (Japan) Rin Kaiho (born 1942) becomes the world no. 1.
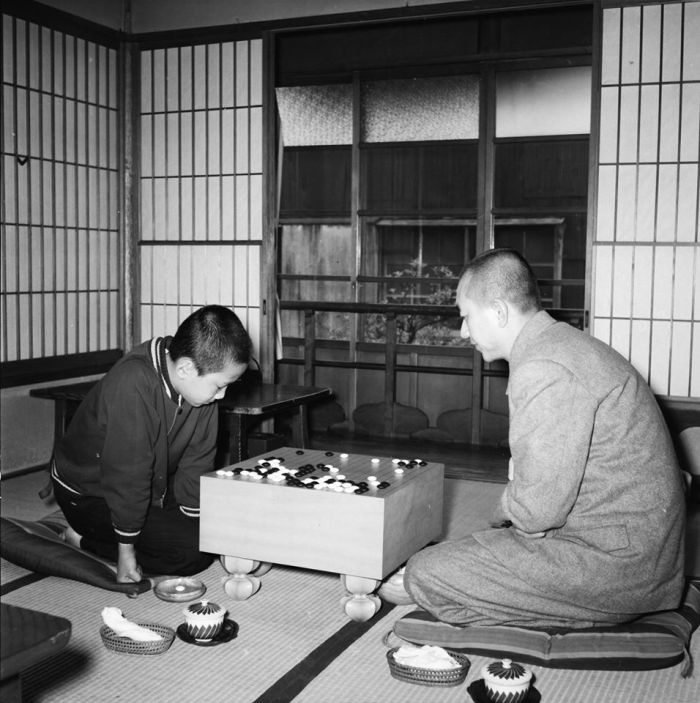
    Go Seigen teaching a young Rin Kaiho
  20. June 1975
    (Japan) Kato Masao (1947–2004) becomes the world no. 1.
  21. 1976
    After the "Meijin Incident" of 1974, the Tengen (1975), Kisei and Gosei (1976) titles complete the seven major Japanese titles. Fujisawa Shūkō wins the first Kisei in 1977.
  22. 1978
    Manfred Wimmer (1944–1995) becomes the first Westerner to receive a professional certificate from an East Asian Go association (Kansai Ki-in); James Kerwin is the first at the Nihon Ki-in.
  23. November 1979
    (South Korea) (Japan) Cho Chikun (born 1956) becomes the world no. 1.
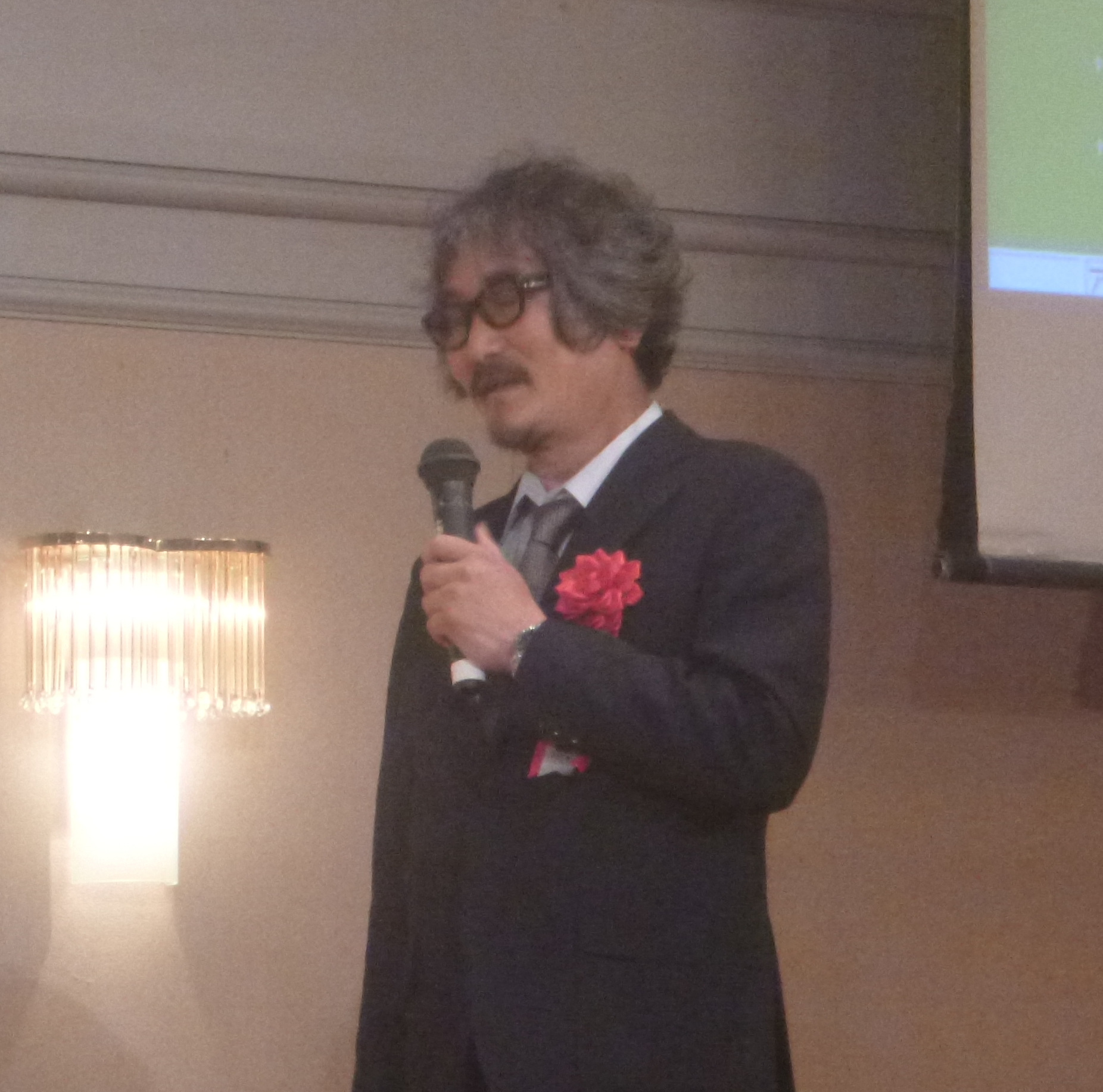
    Cho Chikun
  24. 1984
    Nie Weiping (1952–2026) leads China to victory over Japan in the first China–Japan Super Go Matches, a national triumph.
  25. 1988
    Takemiya Masaki (born 1951) wins the first Fujitsu Cup, one of the first international tournaments.
  26. 1996
    Astronauts Daniel Barry (born 1953) and Koichi Wakata (born 1963) become the first people to play Go in space.
  27. 1998–2003
    The manga Hikaru no Go (later also an anime) sparks a Go boom among young players in Japan.
  28. 2000
    The American Michael Redmond (born 1963) is the first Westerner to reach 9 dan.
  29. 2003
    The Oteai promotion system is discontinued in Japan and a new one introduced.
  30. 2016
    DeepMind's AlphaGo beats Lee Sedol (born 1983) 4–1 in Seoul, the first time an AI beats a top professional. The same year, Iyama Yūta (born 1989) holds all seven Japanese major titles at once.

Ancient and medieval East Asia

- Early 7th century – Chinese chronicles (the Records of the Sui) report that the Japanese enjoy Go.
- 8th century – Go reaches Japan, traditionally brought back from the Tang court by Kibi no Makibi (695–775); the Taihō Code of 701 already describes it.
- 1582 – Honinbo Sansa (1559–1623) plays a triple ko against Kashio Rigen (1565–?) at a monastery in Kyoto in the presence of Oda Nobunaga (1534–1582); the game is suspended. The next day Nobunaga is killed, and a triple ko is considered bad luck ever after.
- 1588 – Toyotomi Hideyoshi (1537–1598) organizes the first Japanese Go tournament; Hon'inbō (Sansa) wins and is granted a salary.

Edo-period Japan and Qing China

- 1603 – Honinbo Sansa (1559–1623) is appointed by Shogun Tokugawa Ieyasu (1543–1616) as head of the Go world (Meijin Godokoro): the major Japanese Go school system begins.
- 1612 – The Tokugawa shogunate (1603–1868) establishes four hereditary Go houses (Hon'inbō, Inoue, Yasui and Hayashi) and pays them stipends; they compete for 250–300 years.
- 1626–1628 – The first castle game, played before the shogun, takes place in 1626; in 1628 the castle games become an official yearly ceremony.
- 1645–1653 – The first official challenge match (sōgo) to decide the Meijin, between Hon'inbō Sanetsu (1611–1658) and Yasui Sanchi (1617–1703).
- Late 17th century – The fourth Hon'inbō, Dōsaku (1645–1702), defeats every top player of his time and is praised as having "thirteen-dan strength".
- 1713 – The Igo Hatsuyoron, a collection of very hard problems, is created.
- 1840 – The "blood-vomiting game": Hon'inbō Jōwa (1787–1847) beats Akaboshi Intetsu (1810–1835) in a week-long match; Akaboshi collapses from exhaustion and dies soon after.
- 1846 – The "ear-reddening game": Honinbo Shusaku (1829–1862)'s move 127 stuns Gennan Inseki (1798–1859), and becomes one of the best moves of all time.
- 1863 – The last castle games are played as the crisis of the shogunate disrupts the ceremonies.

Modern professional Go

- 1868 – The Meiji Restoration (1866–1869) ends the official stipends of the Go houses; Go loses its patrons and the masters struggle.
- 1872 – The first recorded game of Go in Europe is played between Kido Takayoshi (1833–1877) and Ōkubo Toshimichi (1830–1878) of the Iwakura Mission (1871–1873).
- 1878 – The first newspaper Go column appears in Japan, on 1 April. In 1879 the Hoensha society forms; its journal Igo Shinpo is the first Go magazine.
- 1880 – Oskar Korschelt (1853–1940), who learned the game in Japan from Murase Shūho, publishes Das Go Spiel: the first systematic description in a Western language.
- 1909–1910 – The Japanese professional Takabe Dōhei (1881–1951) visits China and introduces play without fixed starting stones.
- 1924 – The Nihon Ki-in, Japan's professional Go association, is founded, ending the hereditary house system and inaugurating the modern rank and tournament system.
- 1933 – The "Game of the Century": Go Seigen (1914–2014) opens at the three-three, star and center points against Honinbo Shusai (1874–1940), in a controversial three-month game that challenges the old system.
- 1935 – A game of Go is broadcast on radio for the first time.
- 1936–1938 – Shūsai hands the Hon'inbō title to the Nihon Ki-in (1936) and retires in 1938 after a game against Kitani Minoru (1909–1975) that inspires the novel The Master of Go by Yasunari Kawabata (1899–1972).
- 1941 – Sekiyama Riichi (1909–1970) wins the first Hon'inbō title tournament, one of the first major modern tournaments with komi (4.5 points).
- 1945 – The "Game Under the Atomic Bomb": the second game of the 3rd Hon'inbō match, played near Hiroshima on August 6, is finished after the blast.
- 1949 – Fujisawa Hōsai (1919–1993) becomes the first player to reach 9 dan under the Oteai promotion system.
- 1950 – Go Seigen is awarded 9 dan, and becomes the world's best player; he wins his ten-game matches against all top rivals until 1956.
- January 1950 – (China) (Japan) Go Seigen becomes the world no. 1.
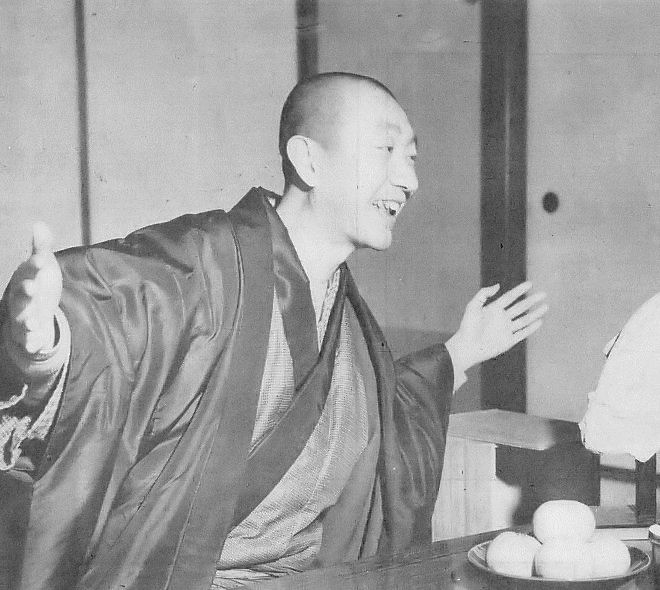
  Go Seigen
- 1954 – The Korea Baduk Association (Hankuk Kiwon) is established, on 28 January. The first NHK Cup is broadcast on radio; it moves to television in 1962.
- January 1959 – (Japan) Sakata Eio (1920–2010) becomes the world no. 1.
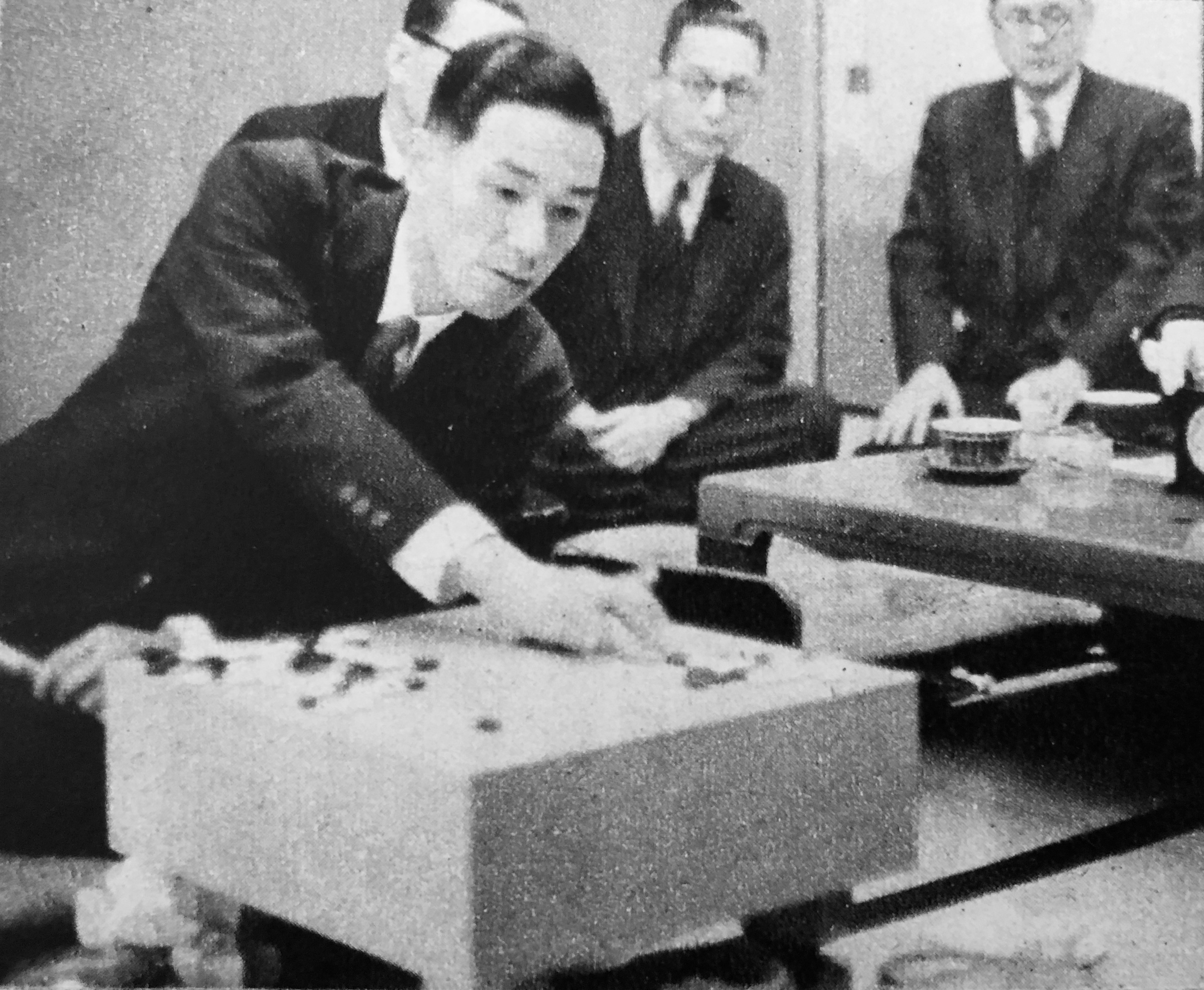
  Sakata Eio
- 1960 – The China–Japan Go Friendship Match starts; it is held every year until 1991.
- 1962 – Fujisawa Shūkō (1925–2009) wins the first Meijin title tournament.
- January 1969 – (Taiwan) (Japan) Rin Kaiho (born 1942) becomes the world no. 1.
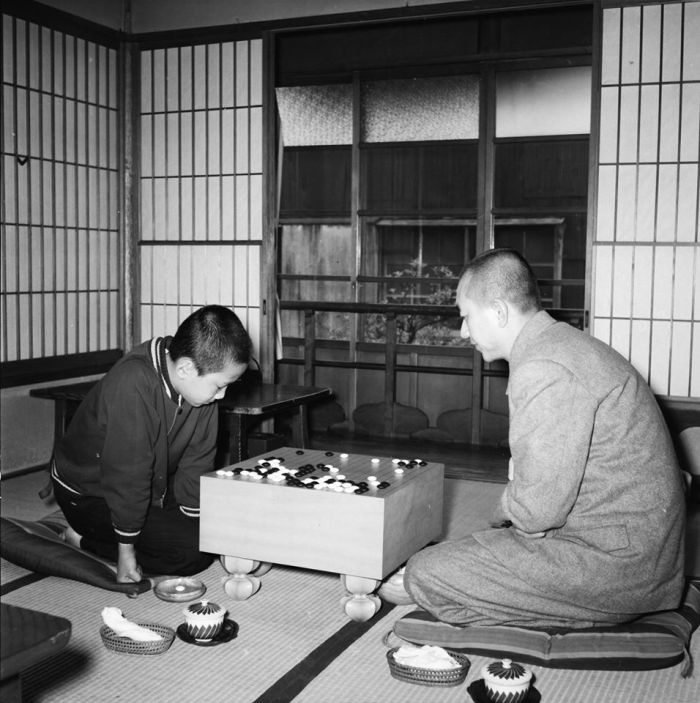
  Go Seigen teaching a young Rin Kaiho
- June 1975 – (Japan) Kato Masao (1947–2004) becomes the world no. 1.
- 1976 – After the "Meijin Incident" of 1974, the Tengen (1975), Kisei and Gosei (1976) titles complete the seven major Japanese titles. Fujisawa Shūkō wins the first Kisei in 1977.
- 1978 – Manfred Wimmer (1944–1995) becomes the first Westerner to receive a professional certificate from an East Asian Go association (Kansai Ki-in); James Kerwin is the first at the Nihon Ki-in.
- November 1979 – (South Korea) (Japan) Cho Chikun (born 1956) becomes the world no. 1.
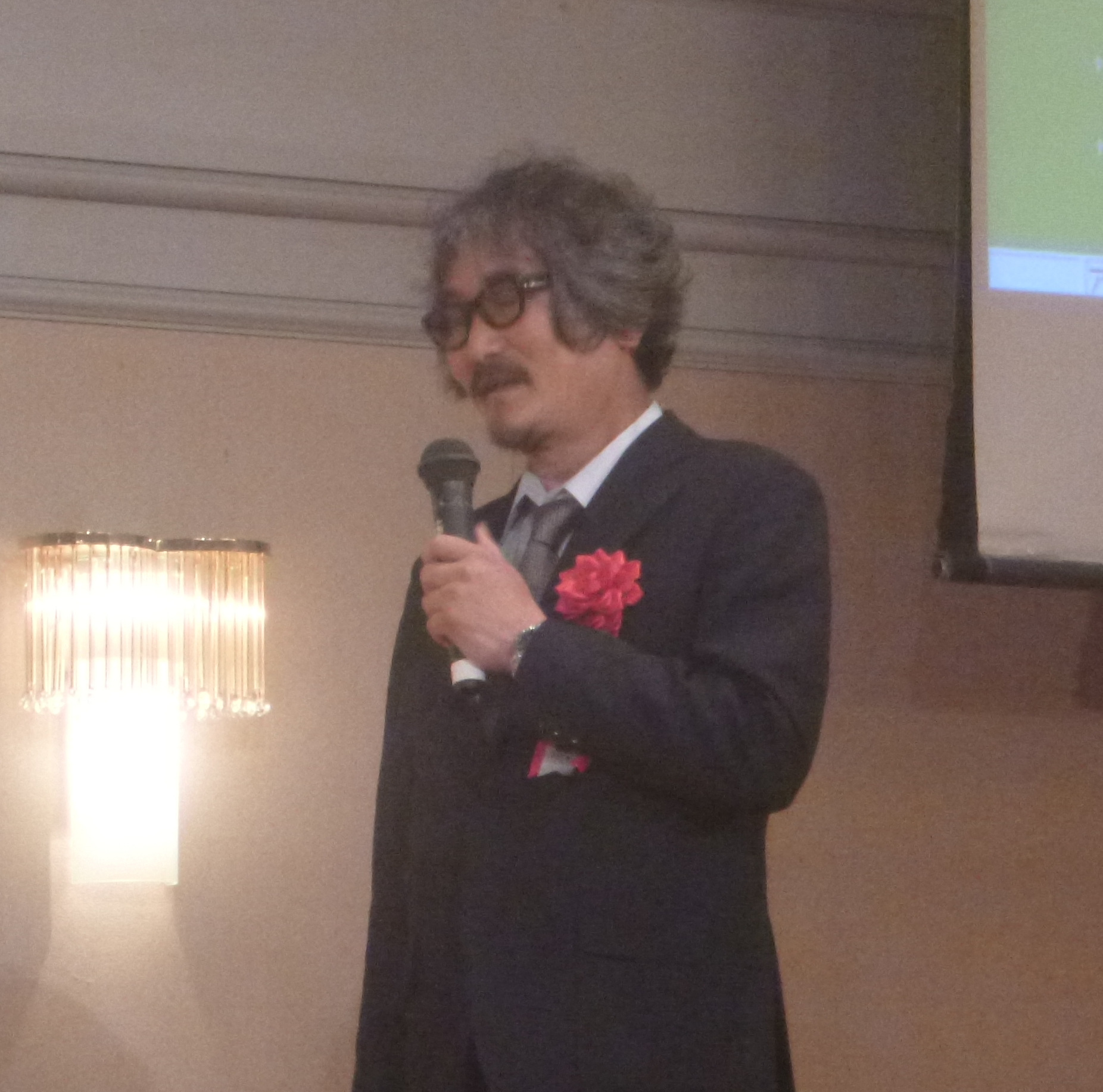
  Cho Chikun
- 1984 – Nie Weiping (1952–2026) leads China to victory over Japan in the first China–Japan Super Go Matches, a national triumph.
- 1988 – Takemiya Masaki (born 1951) wins the first Fujitsu Cup, one of the first international tournaments.
- 1996 – Astronauts Daniel Barry (born 1953) and Koichi Wakata (born 1963) become the first people to play Go in space.
- 1998–2003 – The manga Hikaru no Go (later also an anime) sparks a Go boom among young players in Japan.
- 2000 – The American Michael Redmond (born 1963) is the first Westerner to reach 9 dan.
- 2003 – The Oteai promotion system is discontinued in Japan and a new one introduced.
- 2016 – DeepMind's AlphaGo beats Lee Sedol (born 1983) 4–1 in Seoul, the first time an AI beats a top professional. The same year, Iyama Yūta (born 1989) holds all seven Japanese major titles at once.

| Date | Description | Image |
Ancient and medieval East Asia
| Early 7th century | Chinese chronicles (the Records of the Sui) report that the Japanese enjoy Go. | |
| 8th century | Go reaches Japan, traditionally brought back from the Tang court by Kibi no Makibi (695–775); the Taihō Code of 701 already describes it. | |
| 1582 | Honinbo Sansa (1559–1623) plays a triple ko against Kashio Rigen (1565–?) at a monastery in Kyoto in the presence of Oda Nobunaga (1534–1582); the game is suspended. The next day Nobunaga is killed, and a triple ko is considered bad luck ever after. | |
| 1588 | Toyotomi Hideyoshi (1537–1598) organizes the first Japanese Go tournament; Hon'inbō (Sansa) wins and is granted a salary. | |
Edo-period Japan and Qing China
| 1603 | Honinbo Sansa (1559–1623) is appointed by Shogun Tokugawa Ieyasu (1543–1616) as head of the Go world (Meijin Godokoro): the major Japanese Go school system begins. | |
| 1612 | The Tokugawa shogunate (1603–1868) establishes four hereditary Go houses (Hon'inbō, Inoue, Yasui and Hayashi) and pays them stipends; they compete for 250–300 years. | |
| 1626–1628 | The first castle game, played before the shogun, takes place in 1626; in 1628 the castle games become an official yearly ceremony. | |
| 1645–1653 | The first official challenge match (sōgo) to decide the Meijin, between Hon'inbō Sanetsu (1611–1658) and Yasui Sanchi (1617–1703). | |
| Late 17th century | The fourth Hon'inbō, Dōsaku (1645–1702), defeats every top player of his time and is praised as having "thirteen-dan strength". | |
| 1713 | The Igo Hatsuyoron, a collection of very hard problems, is created. | |
| 1840 | The "blood-vomiting game": Hon'inbō Jōwa (1787–1847) beats Akaboshi Intetsu (1810–1835) in a week-long match; Akaboshi collapses from exhaustion and dies soon after. | |
| 1846 | The "ear-reddening game": Honinbo Shusaku (1829–1862)'s move 127 stuns Gennan Inseki (1798–1859), and becomes one of the best moves of all time. | |
| 1863 | The last castle games are played as the crisis of the shogunate disrupts the ceremonies. | |
Modern professional Go
| 1868 | The Meiji Restoration (1866–1869) ends the official stipends of the Go houses; Go loses its patrons and the masters struggle. | |
| 1872 | The first recorded game of Go in Europe is played between Kido Takayoshi (1833–1877) and Ōkubo Toshimichi (1830–1878) of the Iwakura Mission (1871–1873). | |
| 1878 | The first newspaper Go column appears in Japan, on 1 April. In 1879 the Hoensha society forms; its journal Igo Shinpo is the first Go magazine. | |
| 1880 | Oskar Korschelt (1853–1940), who learned the game in Japan from Murase Shūho, publishes Das Go Spiel: the first systematic description in a Western language. | |
| 1909–1910 | The Japanese professional Takabe Dōhei (1881–1951) visits China and introduces play without fixed starting stones. | |
| 1924 | The Nihon Ki-in, Japan's professional Go association, is founded, ending the hereditary house system and inaugurating the modern rank and tournament system. | |
| 1933 | The "Game of the Century": Go Seigen (1914–2014) opens at the three-three, star and center points against Honinbo Shusai (1874–1940), in a controversial three-month game that challenges the old system. | |
| 1935 | A game of Go is broadcast on radio for the first time. | |
| 1936–1938 | Shūsai hands the Hon'inbō title to the Nihon Ki-in (1936) and retires in 1938 after a game against Kitani Minoru (1909–1975) that inspires the novel The Master of Go by Yasunari Kawabata (1899–1972). | |
| 1941 | Sekiyama Riichi (1909–1970) wins the first Hon'inbō title tournament, one of the first major modern tournaments with komi (4.5 points). | |
| 1945 | The "Game Under the Atomic Bomb": the second game of the 3rd Hon'inbō match, played near Hiroshima on August 6, is finished after the blast. | |
| 1949 | Fujisawa Hōsai (1919–1993) becomes the first player to reach 9 dan under the Oteai promotion system. | |
| 1950 | Go Seigen is awarded 9 dan, and becomes the world's best player; he wins his ten-game matches against all top rivals until 1956. | |
| January 1950 | (China) (Japan) Go Seigen becomes the world no. 1. | Go Seigen |
| 1954 | The Korea Baduk Association (Hankuk Kiwon) is established, on 28 January. The first NHK Cup is broadcast on radio; it moves to television in 1962. | |
| January 1959 | (Japan) Sakata Eio (1920–2010) becomes the world no. 1. | Sakata Eio |
| 1960 | The China–Japan Go Friendship Match starts; it is held every year until 1991. | |
| 1962 | Fujisawa Shūkō (1925–2009) wins the first Meijin title tournament. | |
| January 1969 | (Taiwan) (Japan) Rin Kaiho (born 1942) becomes the world no. 1. | Go Seigen teaching a young Rin Kaiho |
| June 1975 | (Japan) Kato Masao (1947–2004) becomes the world no. 1. | |
| 1976 | After the "Meijin Incident" of 1974, the Tengen (1975), Kisei and Gosei (1976) titles complete the seven major Japanese titles. Fujisawa Shūkō wins the first Kisei in 1977. | |
| 1978 | Manfred Wimmer (1944–1995) becomes the first Westerner to receive a professional certificate from an East Asian Go association (Kansai Ki-in); James Kerwin is the first at the Nihon Ki-in. | |
| November 1979 | (South Korea) (Japan) Cho Chikun (born 1956) becomes the world no. 1. | Cho Chikun |
| 1984 | Nie Weiping (1952–2026) leads China to victory over Japan in the first China–Japan Super Go Matches, a national triumph. | |
| 1988 | Takemiya Masaki (born 1951) wins the first Fujitsu Cup, one of the first international tournaments. | |
| 1996 | Astronauts Daniel Barry (born 1953) and Koichi Wakata (born 1963) become the first people to play Go in space. | |
| 1998–2003 | The manga Hikaru no Go (later also an anime) sparks a Go boom among young players in Japan. | |
| 2000 | The American Michael Redmond (born 1963) is the first Westerner to reach 9 dan. | |
| 2003 | The Oteai promotion system is discontinued in Japan and a new one introduced. | |
| 2016 | DeepMind's AlphaGo beats Lee Sedol (born 1983) 4–1 in Seoul, the first time an AI beats a top professional. The same year, Iyama Yūta (born 1989) holds all seven Japanese major titles at once. | |

== Go in non-Asian countries ==
1. 1615
  Nicolas Trigault (1577–1628) publishes in Augsburg the diaries of the Jesuit Matteo Ricci (1552–1610), which explain the game of weiqi; the book goes through at least 16 editions in European languages.
2. 17th–18th century
  The philosopher Leibniz (1646–1716) publishes an article on Go with a picture of a game, saying he does not know all the rules.
3. 1694
  Thomas Hyde (1636–1703) writes the first detailed description of Go in a European language, in his treatise on oriental board games.
4. 1872
  The first recorded game of Go in Europe is played between Kido Takayoshi (1833–1877) and Ōkubo Toshimichi (1830–1878) of the Iwakura Mission (1871–1873).
5. 1880
  Oskar Korschelt (1853–1940), who learned the game in Japan from Murase Shūho, publishes Das Go Spiel: the first systematic description in a Western language.
6. 1905–1908
  Edward Lasker (1885–1981) learns Go in Berlin (1905) and later founds the New York Go Club; in 1908 Arthur Smith publishes the first Go book in English, The Game of Go.
7. 1934–1937
  Lasker's Go and Go-moku (1934) helps popularize the game in the US; the American Go Association is formed in 1935 and the German Go Association in 1937.
8. 1978
  Manfred Wimmer (1944–1995) becomes the first Westerner to receive a professional certificate from an East Asian Go association (Kansai Ki-in); James Kerwin is the first at the Nihon Ki-in.
9. 1996
  Astronauts Daniel Barry (born 1953) and Koichi Wakata (born 1963) become the first people to play Go in space.
10. 2000
  The American Michael Redmond (born 1963) is the first Westerner to reach 9 dan.
11. 2011–2014
  The American Go Association signs an agreement with the Korean Baduk Association to promote its own professional system (2011); the European Go Federation creates its own (2014).
- 1615 – Nicolas Trigault (1577–1628) publishes in Augsburg the diaries of the Jesuit Matteo Ricci (1552–1610), which explain the game of weiqi; the book goes through at least 16 editions in European languages.
- 17th–18th century – The philosopher Leibniz (1646–1716) publishes an article on Go with a picture of a game, saying he does not know all the rules.
- 1694 – Thomas Hyde (1636–1703) writes the first detailed description of Go in a European language, in his treatise on oriental board games.
- 1872 – The first recorded game of Go in Europe is played between Kido Takayoshi (1833–1877) and Ōkubo Toshimichi (1830–1878) of the Iwakura Mission (1871–1873).
- 1880 – Oskar Korschelt (1853–1940), who learned the game in Japan from Murase Shūho, publishes Das Go Spiel: the first systematic description in a Western language.
- 1905–1908 – Edward Lasker (1885–1981) learns Go in Berlin (1905) and later founds the New York Go Club; in 1908 Arthur Smith publishes the first Go book in English, The Game of Go.
- 1934–1937 – Lasker's Go and Go-moku (1934) helps popularize the game in the US; the American Go Association is formed in 1935 and the German Go Association in 1937.
- 1978 – Manfred Wimmer (1944–1995) becomes the first Westerner to receive a professional certificate from an East Asian Go association (Kansai Ki-in); James Kerwin is the first at the Nihon Ki-in.
- 1996 – Astronauts Daniel Barry (born 1953) and Koichi Wakata (born 1963) become the first people to play Go in space.
- 2000 – The American Michael Redmond (born 1963) is the first Westerner to reach 9 dan.
- 2011–2014 – The American Go Association signs an agreement with the Korean Baduk Association to promote its own professional system (2011); the European Go Federation creates its own (2014).

| Date | Description |
|---|---|
| 1615 | Nicolas Trigault (1577–1628) publishes in Augsburg the diaries of the Jesuit Matteo Ricci (1552–1610), which explain the game of weiqi; the book goes through at least 16 editions in European languages. |
| 17th–18th century | The philosopher Leibniz (1646–1716) publishes an article on Go with a picture of a game, saying he does not know all the rules. |
| 1694 | Thomas Hyde (1636–1703) writes the first detailed description of Go in a European language, in his treatise on oriental board games. |
| 1872 | The first recorded game of Go in Europe is played between Kido Takayoshi (1833–1877) and Ōkubo Toshimichi (1830–1878) of the Iwakura Mission (1871–1873). |
| 1880 | Oskar Korschelt (1853–1940), who learned the game in Japan from Murase Shūho, publishes Das Go Spiel: the first systematic description in a Western language. |
| 1905–1908 | Edward Lasker (1885–1981) learns Go in Berlin (1905) and later founds the New York Go Club; in 1908 Arthur Smith publishes the first Go book in English, The Game of Go. |
| 1934–1937 | Lasker's Go and Go-moku (1934) helps popularize the game in the US; the American Go Association is formed in 1935 and the German Go Association in 1937. |
| 1978 | Manfred Wimmer (1944–1995) becomes the first Westerner to receive a professional certificate from an East Asian Go association (Kansai Ki-in); James Kerwin is the first at the Nihon Ki-in. |
| 1996 | Astronauts Daniel Barry (born 1953) and Koichi Wakata (born 1963) become the first people to play Go in space. |
| 2000 | The American Michael Redmond (born 1963) is the first Westerner to reach 9 dan. |
| 2011–2014 | The American Go Association signs an agreement with the Korean Baduk Association to promote its own professional system (2011); the European Go Federation creates its own (2014). |

== Internet Go ==
1. 19 December 1976
  A friendship match between Taiwan and the United States is played by teletype; in 1978 the UK and the USSR play one by telephone.
2. 1984
  The first computer Go event, the Acornsoft tournament for the BBC Micro, is held. Greg Hale writes inetgo, probably the first program to play Go over the internet.
3. 2 February 1992
  The Internet Go Server (IGS), the first server dedicated to Go, starts.
4. Late 2016 – early 2017
  A stronger version of DeepMind's AlphaGo ("Master") wins 60 games in a row, anonymously, online against top professionals.
- 19 December 1976 – A friendship match between Taiwan and the United States is played by teletype; in 1978 the UK and the USSR play one by telephone.
- 1984 – The first computer Go event, the Acornsoft tournament for the BBC Micro, is held. Greg Hale writes inetgo, probably the first program to play Go over the internet.
- 2 February 1992 – The Internet Go Server (IGS), the first server dedicated to Go, starts.
- Late 2016 – early 2017 – A stronger version of DeepMind's AlphaGo ("Master") wins 60 games in a row, anonymously, online against top professionals.

| Date | Description |
|---|---|
| 19 December 1976 | A friendship match between Taiwan and the United States is played by teletype; in 1978 the UK and the USSR play one by telephone. |
| 1984 | The first computer Go event, the Acornsoft tournament for the BBC Micro, is held. Greg Hale writes inetgo, probably the first program to play Go over the internet. |
| 2 February 1992 | The Internet Go Server (IGS), the first server dedicated to Go, starts. |
| Late 2016 – early 2017 | A stronger version of DeepMind's AlphaGo ("Master") wins 60 games in a row, anonymously, online against top professionals. |

== Computer Go ==
1. 1968
  Albert Zobrist (born 1942) writes the first program that plays complete games of Go.
2. 19 December 1976
  A friendship match between Taiwan and the United States is played by teletype; in 1978 the UK and the USSR play one by telephone.
3. 1984
  The first computer Go event, the Acornsoft tournament for the BBC Micro, is held. Greg Hale writes inetgo, probably the first program to play Go over the internet.
4. 1985
  The Ing Prize for computer programs starts; it expires in 2000, when the last challenge was won by HandTalk at an 11-stone handicap against a young professional.
5. 2 February 1992
  The Internet Go Server (IGS), the first server dedicated to Go, starts.
6. 1993
  Bruegmann's Gobble is the first Go program based on random playouts (Monte Carlo).
7. 2006
  The UCT algorithm, a Monte Carlo tree search, is developed; a program using it, CrazyStone, wins the Computer Olympiad 9×9 Go event the same year.
8. 2008
  MoGo wins one of three games against the professional Catalin Taranu on 9×9 and later beats an 8-dan Korean professional on 19×19 with a 9-stone handicap.
9. 2012
  The program Zen beats Takemiya Masaki (born 1951) in games with 5 and 4 handicap stones.
10. October 2015
  AlphaGo, made by Google's DeepMind, beats the European champion Fan Hui (2p) 5–0 in even games: the first time a program beats a professional.
11. 2016
  DeepMind's AlphaGo beats Lee Sedol (born 1983) 4–1 in Seoul, the first time an AI beats a top professional. The same year, Iyama Yūta (born 1989) holds all seven Japanese major titles at once.
12. Late 2016 – early 2017
  A stronger version of DeepMind's AlphaGo ("Master") wins 60 games in a row, anonymously, online against top professionals.
13. May 2017
  DeepMind's new and much improved AlphaGo plays Ke Jie (born 1997) and wins all three games; Ke Jie says its play is "like a god of Go".
14. 2019
  The open-source Go AI KataGo is created by David Wu.
15. 2026
  Shin Jinseo (born 2000) defeats a new version of KataGo on a 2-stone handicap, coming back from a first-game defeat to win the next two.
- 1968 – Albert Zobrist (born 1942) writes the first program that plays complete games of Go.
- 19 December 1976 – A friendship match between Taiwan and the United States is played by teletype; in 1978 the UK and the USSR play one by telephone.
- 1984 – The first computer Go event, the Acornsoft tournament for the BBC Micro, is held. Greg Hale writes inetgo, probably the first program to play Go over the internet.
- 1985 – The Ing Prize for computer programs starts; it expires in 2000, when the last challenge was won by HandTalk at an 11-stone handicap against a young professional.
- 2 February 1992 – The Internet Go Server (IGS), the first server dedicated to Go, starts.
- 1993 – Bruegmann's Gobble is the first Go program based on random playouts (Monte Carlo).
- 2006 – The UCT algorithm, a Monte Carlo tree search, is developed; a program using it, CrazyStone, wins the Computer Olympiad 9×9 Go event the same year.
- 2008 – MoGo wins one of three games against the professional Catalin Taranu on 9×9 and later beats an 8-dan Korean professional on 19×19 with a 9-stone handicap.
- 2012 – The program Zen beats Takemiya Masaki (born 1951) in games with 5 and 4 handicap stones.
- October 2015 – AlphaGo, made by Google's DeepMind, beats the European champion Fan Hui (2p) 5–0 in even games: the first time a program beats a professional.
- 2016 – DeepMind's AlphaGo beats Lee Sedol (born 1983) 4–1 in Seoul, the first time an AI beats a top professional. The same year, Iyama Yūta (born 1989) holds all seven Japanese major titles at once.
- Late 2016 – early 2017 – A stronger version of DeepMind's AlphaGo ("Master") wins 60 games in a row, anonymously, online against top professionals.
- May 2017 – DeepMind's new and much improved AlphaGo plays Ke Jie (born 1997) and wins all three games; Ke Jie says its play is "like a god of Go".
- 2019 – The open-source Go AI KataGo is created by David Wu.
- 2026 – Shin Jinseo (born 2000) defeats a new version of KataGo on a 2-stone handicap, coming back from a first-game defeat to win the next two.

| Date | Description |
|---|---|
| 1968 | Albert Zobrist (born 1942) writes the first program that plays complete games of Go. |
| 19 December 1976 | A friendship match between Taiwan and the United States is played by teletype; in 1978 the UK and the USSR play one by telephone. |
| 1984 | The first computer Go event, the Acornsoft tournament for the BBC Micro, is held. Greg Hale writes inetgo, probably the first program to play Go over the internet. |
| 1985 | The Ing Prize for computer programs starts; it expires in 2000, when the last challenge was won by HandTalk at an 11-stone handicap against a young professional. |
| 2 February 1992 | The Internet Go Server (IGS), the first server dedicated to Go, starts. |
| 1993 | Bruegmann's Gobble is the first Go program based on random playouts (Monte Carlo). |
| 2006 | The UCT algorithm, a Monte Carlo tree search, is developed; a program using it, CrazyStone, wins the Computer Olympiad 9×9 Go event the same year. |
| 2008 | MoGo wins one of three games against the professional Catalin Taranu on 9×9 and later beats an 8-dan Korean professional on 19×19 with a 9-stone handicap. |
| 2012 | The program Zen beats Takemiya Masaki (born 1951) in games with 5 and 4 handicap stones. |
| October 2015 | AlphaGo, made by Google's DeepMind, beats the European champion Fan Hui (2p) 5–0 in even games: the first time a program beats a professional. |
| 2016 | DeepMind's AlphaGo beats Lee Sedol (born 1983) 4–1 in Seoul, the first time an AI beats a top professional. The same year, Iyama Yūta (born 1989) holds all seven Japanese major titles at once. |
| Late 2016 – early 2017 | A stronger version of DeepMind's AlphaGo ("Master") wins 60 games in a row, anonymously, online against top professionals. |
| May 2017 | DeepMind's new and much improved AlphaGo plays Ke Jie (born 1997) and wins all three games; Ke Jie says its play is "like a god of Go". |
| 2019 | The open-source Go AI KataGo is created by David Wu. |
| 2026 | Shin Jinseo (born 2000) defeats a new version of KataGo on a 2-stone handicap, coming back from a first-game defeat to win the next two. |

== The AI era ==
1. October 2015
  AlphaGo, made by Google's DeepMind, beats the European champion Fan Hui (2p) 5–0 in even games: the first time a program beats a professional.
2. 2016
  DeepMind's AlphaGo beats Lee Sedol (born 1983) 4–1 in Seoul, the first time an AI beats a top professional. The same year, Iyama Yūta (born 1989) holds all seven Japanese major titles at once.
3. Late 2016 – early 2017
  A stronger version of DeepMind's AlphaGo ("Master") wins 60 games in a row, anonymously, online against top professionals.
4. May 2017
  DeepMind's new and much improved AlphaGo plays Ke Jie (born 1997) and wins all three games; Ke Jie says its play is "like a god of Go".
5. 2019
  The open-source Go AI KataGo is created by David Wu.
6. 2019
  Lee Sedol announces his retirement, citing AlphaGo as "an entity that cannot be defeated".
7. 2026
  Shin Jinseo (born 2000) defeats a new version of KataGo on a 2-stone handicap, coming back from a first-game defeat to win the next two.
- October 2015 – AlphaGo, made by Google's DeepMind, beats the European champion Fan Hui (2p) 5–0 in even games: the first time a program beats a professional.
- 2016 – DeepMind's AlphaGo beats Lee Sedol (born 1983) 4–1 in Seoul, the first time an AI beats a top professional. The same year, Iyama Yūta (born 1989) holds all seven Japanese major titles at once.
- Late 2016 – early 2017 – A stronger version of DeepMind's AlphaGo ("Master") wins 60 games in a row, anonymously, online against top professionals.
- May 2017 – DeepMind's new and much improved AlphaGo plays Ke Jie (born 1997) and wins all three games; Ke Jie says its play is "like a god of Go".
- 2019 – The open-source Go AI KataGo is created by David Wu.
- 2019 – Lee Sedol announces his retirement, citing AlphaGo as "an entity that cannot be defeated".
- 2026 – Shin Jinseo (born 2000) defeats a new version of KataGo on a 2-stone handicap, coming back from a first-game defeat to win the next two.

| Date | Description |
|---|---|
| October 2015 | AlphaGo, made by Google's DeepMind, beats the European champion Fan Hui (2p) 5–0 in even games: the first time a program beats a professional. |
| 2016 | DeepMind's AlphaGo beats Lee Sedol (born 1983) 4–1 in Seoul, the first time an AI beats a top professional. The same year, Iyama Yūta (born 1989) holds all seven Japanese major titles at once. |
| Late 2016 – early 2017 | A stronger version of DeepMind's AlphaGo ("Master") wins 60 games in a row, anonymously, online against top professionals. |
| May 2017 | DeepMind's new and much improved AlphaGo plays Ke Jie (born 1997) and wins all three games; Ke Jie says its play is "like a god of Go". |
| 2019 | The open-source Go AI KataGo is created by David Wu. |
| 2019 | Lee Sedol announces his retirement, citing AlphaGo as "an entity that cannot be defeated". |
| 2026 | Shin Jinseo (born 2000) defeats a new version of KataGo on a 2-stone handicap, coming back from a first-game defeat to win the next two. |

== Sensei's Library ==
1. 21 October 2000
  Two enthusiasts, Arno and Morten, start a wiki meant as an online repository of all Go knowledge: Sensei's Library.
2. 5 January 2001
  Sensei's Library opens to the public, announced on the Usenet group rec.games.go.
3. 11 January 2004
  A French version, EncyGoPédie, is released.
4. 11 November 2004
  The 10,000th page is added.
5. 3 November 2007
  The first full-board (19×19) position search.
6. 22 April 2009
  A customised board search is added.
7. 28 May 2010
  The 20,000th page is created, by Dave Sigaty.
- 21 October 2000 – Two enthusiasts, Arno and Morten, start a wiki meant as an online repository of all Go knowledge: Sensei's Library.
- 5 January 2001 – Sensei's Library opens to the public, announced on the Usenet group rec.games.go.
- 11 January 2004 – A French version, EncyGoPédie, is released.
- 11 November 2004 – The 10,000th page is added.
- 3 November 2007 – The first full-board (19×19) position search.
- 22 April 2009 – A customised board search is added.
- 28 May 2010 – The 20,000th page is created, by Dave Sigaty.

| Date | Description |
|---|---|
| 21 October 2000 | Two enthusiasts, Arno and Morten, start a wiki meant as an online repository of all Go knowledge: Sensei's Library. |
| 5 January 2001 | Sensei's Library opens to the public, announced on the Usenet group rec.games.go. |
| 11 January 2004 | A French version, EncyGoPédie, is released. |
| 11 November 2004 | The 10,000th page is added. |
| 3 November 2007 | The first full-board (19×19) position search. |
| 22 April 2009 | A customised board search is added. |
| 28 May 2010 | The 20,000th page is created, by Dave Sigaty. |

== See also ==
- History of Go
- Go (game)
- Timeline of artificial intelligence

== Sources ==
- Potter, Donald L. (1984). "Go in the Classics". Go World (37). Tokyo: Ishi Press: 16–18. Archived from the original on 18 December 2010.
- Potter, Donald L. (1985). "Go in the Classics (ii): the Tso-chuan". Go World (42). Tokyo: Ishi Press: 19–21. Archived from the original on 18 December 2010.
- Fairbairn, John (1995). "Go in Ancient China".
- Fairbairn, John (2000). "History of Go in Korea". Archived from the original on 8 June 2011.
- Lasker, Edward (1960) [1934]. Go and Go-Moku. Courier Corporation. ISBN 0-486-20613-0.
- Pinckard, William (1989). "The Four Accomplishments". In Richard Bozulich (ed.). Japanese Prints and the World of Go. Archived from the original on 16 March 2008..
- Peng, Mike; Hall, Mark (1996). "One Giant Leap For Go" (PDF). Svensk Gotidning. 96 (2): 7–8. Archived from the original (PDF) on 4 March 2012.
- Shotwell, Peter (3 April 2003). "The Game of Go in Ancient and Modern Tibet" (PDF). Archived from the original (PDF) on 31 January 2023. Revision of Shotwell, Peter (1993). "Go in the Snow". GoWorld. No. 69.
- Shotwell, Peter (2011). Go! More Than a Game. Tuttle Publishing. ISBN 9781462900060

== Timelines elsewhere ==
- Milton N. Bradley, "How Go came to America"
- Jan van der Steen's history pages on GoBase
- Extensive timelines are included on the GoGoD CD (Go Game Database)
- "History of Go in France 1965–2007" at Sensei's Library
- The book Eurogo
