= 2026 VBA season =

11th season of Vietnam's professional basketball league

2026 VBA Season
- League: Vietnam Basketball Association
- Duration: 21 May – 30 August (Regular season); 5 – 10 September (Semifinals); 19 – 27 September (Finals)
- Games: 68
- Teams: 6
- TV partner: FBT Play
- Streaming partner: Facebook Watch

Regular season
- Supporter's Cup: Hanoi Buffaloes
- Season MVP: AJ Bramah (Hanoi)
- Top scorer: AJ Bramah (Hanoi)

Finals
- Champions: Saigon Heat (6th title)
- Runners-up: Hanoi Buffaloes
- Finals MVP: Brandis Raley-Ross (Saigon)

Seasons
- ← 2025 2027 →

The 2026 VBA season (Vietnamese: VBA mùa giải 2026) was the eleventh season of the Vietnam Basketball Association. The regular season began on 21 May and ended on 30 August.

The Hanoi Buffaloes entered the season as the defending champions.

== Teams ==
Only six teams from the previous season.

=== Locations, venues and personnel ===
Team	Location	Arena	Head coach	Captain
Cantho Catfish	Ho Chi Minh City (Xuan Hoa)	Ho Xuan Huong Arena	(Vietnam) Phan Thanh Canh	(Vietnam) Huynh Thanh Tam
Danang Dragons	Da Nang	5th Military Region Arena	(Vietnam) Hoang The Vinh	(Vietnam) Michael Soy
Hanoi Buffaloes	Hanoi	Xuan Dinh Arena	(United States) Matt Van Pelt	(Philippines) Lian Ramiro
Ho Chi Minh City Wings	Ho Chi Minh City (Xuan Hoa)	Ho Xuan Huong Arena	(Vietnam) Le Tran Minh Nghia	(Vietnam) Du Minh An
Nha Trang Dolphins	Nha Trang	Khanh Hoa Provincial Gymnasium	(United States) Todd Purves	(United States) C. J. Jackson
Saigon Heat	Ho Chi Minh City (Tan My)	MLC Arena	(Vietnam) Vu The Cang	(United States) Brandis Raley-Ross

=== Coaching Transactions ===
Coaching changes
Team	2025 season	2026 season
Off-season
Saigon Heat	(United Kingdom) David Grice	(Vietnam) Vu The Cang

== Regular season ==
The regular season began on 21 May, and ended on 30 August. The Hanoi Buffaloes clinched their second regular season championship on 14 August.

=== Standings ===
Pos	Team	Pld	W	L	PF	PA	PD	PCT	Qualification or relegation
1	Hanoi Buffaloes (C)	20	19	1	1993	1695	+298	.950	Regular season champions Qualification to playoffs
2	Saigon Heat (Q)	20	12	8	1730	1573	+157	.600	Qualification to playoffs
3	Nha Trang Dolphins (Q)	20	12	8	1815	1758	+57	.600	Qualification to playoffs
4	Ho Chi Minh City Wings (Q)	20	10	10	1695	1679	+16	.500	Qualification to playoffs
5	Cantho Catfish (E)	20	7	13	1646	1777	−131	.350	
6	Danang Dragons (E)	20	0	20	1599	1996	−397	.000	

Source: VBA
(C) Champions; (E) Eliminated; (Q) Qualified for the phase indicated

=== Results ===
==== Week 1 ====
21 May 2026	Hanoi Buffaloes	116–92	Nha Trang Dolphins	Xuan Dinh Arena, Hanoi
19:30 (UTC+7)	Scoring by quarter: 32–23, 25–18, 25–33, 34–18
FPT Play	Pts: Bramah 40; Rebs: Bramah, Gholizadeh 13; Asts: Williams 8	boxscore	Pts: Azzaya, Jackson 20; Rebs: Jackson, Mitchell 9 Asts: Azzaya 6

22 May 2026	Saigon Heat	90–64	Cantho Catfish	MLC Arena, Ho Chi Minh City
19:30 (UTC+7)	Scoring by quarter: 25–15, 22–13, 28–15, 15–21
FPT Play	Pts: Mayali 24; Rebs: Phu Vinh 13; Asts: Mayali, Truc Nhan 6	boxscore	Pts: C. Raley-Ross 22; Rebs: C. Raley-Ross 11; Asts: C. Raley-Ross 6

23 May 2026	Hanoi Buffaloes	111–101	Nha Trang Dolphins	Xuan Dinh Arena, Hanoi
19:30 (UTC+7)	Scoring by quarter: 38–20, 18–33, 24–32, 31–16
FPT Play	Pts: Bramah 35; Rebs: Bramah 15; Asts: Williams 6	boxscore	Pts: Nasanbat 21; Rebs: Mitchell 8 Asts: Jackson, Vinh Quang 4

24 May 2026	Saigon Heat	93–73	Cantho Catfish	MLC Arena, Ho Chi Minh City
19:30 (UTC+7)	Scoring by quarter: 32–13, 25–24, 19–22, 17–14
FPT Play	Pts: B. Raley-Ross 21; Rebs: B. Raley-Ross 12; Asts: Anh Kiet 6	boxscore	Pts: Opena 20; Rebs: Opena 13; Asts: C. Raley-Ross 6

==== Week 2 ====
28 May 2026	Danang Dragons	82–95	Ho Chi Minh City Wings	5th Military Region Arena, Da Nang
19:30 (UTC+7)	Scoring by quarter: 21–26, 14–29, 22–21, 25–19
FPT Play	Pts: Soy 25; Rebs: Albabeish 12; Asts: Young-woong 5	boxscore	Pts: Zinser 23; Rebs: Tykhonov 14; Asts: Minh An 8

29 May 2026	Nha Trang Dolphins	78–87	Saigon Heat	Khanh Hoa Provincial Gymnasium, Nha Trang
19:30 (UTC+7)	Scoring by quarter: 26–16, 18–16, 16–21, 18–34
FPT Play	Pts: Jackson 26; Rebs: Jackson 11; Asts: Nasanbat 4	boxscore	Pts: B. Raley-Ross 19; Rebs: Phu Vinh 12; Asts: Mayali 5

30 May 2026	Danang Dragons	66–75	Ho Chi Minh City Wings	5th Military Region Arena, Da Nang
19:30 (UTC+7)	Scoring by quarter: 18–14, 8–19, 22–19, 18–23
FPT Play	Pts: Soy 24; Rebs: Thomas 13; Asts: Soy 5	boxscore	Pts: Munkh-Ochir 20; Rebs: Tykhonov 12; Asts: Minh An, Zinser 3

31 May 2026	Nha Trang Dolphins	85–82	Saigon Heat	Khanh Hoa Provincial Gymnasium, Nha Trang
19:30 (UTC+7)	Scoring by quarter: 33–15, 12–30, 12–20, 28–17
FPT Play	Pts: Jackson 27; Rebs: Jackson, L. Dang Khoa 11; Asts: L. Dang Khoa 5	boxscore	Pts: Mayali, B. Raley-Ross 23; Rebs: B. Raley-Ross 13; Asts: Anh Kiet, B. Raley-Ross 5

==== Week 3 ====
4 June 2026	Cantho Catfish	80–116	Hanoi Buffaloes	Ho Xuan Huong Arena, Ho Chi Minh City
19:30 (UTC+7)	Scoring by quarter: 19–29, 29–26, 15–33, 17–28
FPT Play	Pts: Sumbry 24; Rebs: Sumbry 14; Asts: Opena 5	boxscore	Pts: Bramah 24; Rebs: Bramah 12; Asts: Williams 7

5 June 2026	Danang Dragons	78–129	Saigon Heat	5th Military Region Arena, Da Nang
19:30 (UTC+7)	Scoring by quarter: 19–33, 20–27, 20–34, 19–35
FPT Play	Pts: Albabeish, Soy 15; Rebs: Minh Tam 6 Asts: Young-woong 4	boxscore	Pts: Phu Vinh 27; Rebs: Andrews 10; Asts: Anh Kiet, Mayali 7

6 June 2026	Cantho Catfish	80–87	Hanoi Buffaloes	Ho Xuan Huong Arena, Ho Chi Minh City
19:30 (UTC+7)	Scoring by quarter: 19–19, 22–28, 20–27, 19–13
FPT Play	Pts: Sumbry 22; Rebs: Sumbry 15; Asts: Thanh Tam 10	boxscore	Pts: Bramah 27; Rebs: Bramah 14; Asts: Bramah, Ramiro 4

7 June 2026	Danang Dragons	64–112	Saigon Heat	5th Military Region Arena, Da Nang
19:30 (UTC+7)	Scoring by quarter: 21–27, 7–30, 16–28, 20–27
FPT Play	Pts: Soy 21; Rebs: Albabeish, Edo 9 Asts: Trong Tai 4	boxscore	Pts: Anh Kiet 20; Rebs: Andrews 10; Asts: three players 3

==== Week 4 ====
11 June 2026	Danang Dragons	86–94	Cantho Catfish	5th Military Region Arena, Da Nang
19:30 (UTC+7)	Scoring by quarter: 24–15, 22–33, 23–29, 17–17
FPT Play	Pts: Albabeish 25; Rebs: Albabeish 9 Asts: Soy 14	boxscore	Pts: Sumbry 24; Rebs: Sumbry 10; Asts: Thanh Tam 8

12 June 2026	Ho Chi Minh City Wings	65–91	Hanoi Buffaloes	Ho Xuan Huong Arena, Ho Chi Minh City
19:30 (UTC+7)	Scoring by quarter: 13–32, 25–17, 12–16, 15–26
FPT Play	Pts: Munkh-Ochir 18; Rebs: Tykhonov 21; Asts: Minh An 6	boxscore	Pts: Bramah 26; Rebs: Bramah 17; Asts: Huy Hoang 5

13 June 2026	Danang Dragons	76–83	Cantho Catfish	5th Military Region Arena, Da Nang
19:30 (UTC+7)	Scoring by quarter: 21–16, 19–32, 15–20, 21–15
FPT Play	Pts: Edo 21; Rebs: Albabeish 10; Asts: Soy, Young-ung 3	boxscore	Pts: Belguundariya 18; Rebs: Opena 12; Asts: Thanh Tam 6

14 June 2026	Ho Chi Minh City Wings	73–85	Hanoi Buffaloes	Ho Xuan Huong Arena, Ho Chi Minh City
19:30 (UTC+7)	Scoring by quarter: 21–20, 26–29, 14–19, 12–17
FPT Play	Pts: Quang Duy 15; Rebs: Tykhonov 15; Asts: Tykhonov 5	boxscore	Pts: Bramah 30; Rebs: Bramah 17; Asts: Thai Hung, Ramiro 4

==== Week 5 ====
18 June 2026	Ho Chi Minh City Wings	100–84	Nha Trang Dolphins	Ho Xuan Huong Arena, Ho Chi Minh City
19:30 (UTC+7)	Scoring by quarter: 18–24, 29–16, 27–20, 26–24
FPT Play	Pts: Zinser 33; Rebs: Tykhonov 13; Asts: Zinser 5	boxscore	Pts: Bryant 17; Rebs: Bryant 9 Asts: Huy Hoan, Quang Anh 4

19 June 2026	Saigon Heat	81–84	Hanoi Buffaloes	MLC Arena, Ho Chi Minh City
19:30 (UTC+7)	Scoring by quarter: 18–20, 22–23, 17–24, 24–17
FPT Play	Pts: B. Raley-Ross 24; Rebs: Anh Kiet 8 Asts: Anh Kiet 4	boxscore	Pts: Bramah 27; Rebs: Bramah 14; Asts: Bramah 7

20 June 2026	Ho Chi Minh City Wings	80–91	Nha Trang Dolphins	Ho Xuan Huong Arena, Ho Chi Minh City
19:30 (UTC+7)	Scoring by quarter: 20–21, 18–24, 26–25, 16–21
FPT Play	Pts: Zinser 25; Rebs: Zinser 10; Asts: four players 3	boxscore	Pts: Bryant 23; Rebs: Jackson 13; Asts: three players 4

21 June 2026	Saigon Heat	86–92	Hanoi Buffaloes	MLC Arena, Ho Chi Minh City
19:30 (UTC+7)	Scoring by quarter: 19–27, 19–20, 24–22, 24–23
FPT Play	Pts: B. Raley-Ross 26; Rebs: Andrews 12; Asts: Mayali 5	boxscore	Pts: Bramah 32; Rebs: Bramah 17; Asts: Ramiro 4

==== Week 6 ====
25 June 2026	Danang Dragons	97–100	Hanoi Buffaloes	5th Military Region Arena, Da Nang
19:30 (UTC+7)	Scoring by quarter: 30–26, 28–24, 22–26, 17–24
FPT Play	Pts: Soy 24; Rebs: Albabeish 15; Asts: Soy, Wood 6	boxscore	Pts: Bramah 40; Rebs: Bramah 13; Asts: Williams 5

26 June 2026	Cantho Catfish	79–101	Nha Trang Dolphins	Ho Xuan Huong Arena, Ho Chi Minh City
19:30 (UTC+7)	Scoring by quarter: 19–26, 16–30, 21–25, 23–20
FPT Play	Pts: C. Raley-Ross 16; Rebs: Sumbry 12; Asts: Opena 3	boxscore	Pts: Bryant 20; Rebs: Bryant, L. Dang Khoa 7 Asts: Huy Hoan, Jackson 4

27 June 2026	Danang Dragons	69–100	Hanoi Buffaloes	5th Military Region Arena, Da Nang
19:30 (UTC+7)	Scoring by quarter: 20–28, 12–25, 13–28, 24–19
FPT Play	Pts: Albabeish 15; Rebs: Edo 12; Asts: Albabeish 4	boxscore	Pts: Gholizadeh 34; Rebs: Gholizadeh 13; Asts: Ramiro 7

28 June 2026	Cantho Catfish	69–84	Nha Trang Dolphins	Ho Xuan Huong Arena, Ho Chi Minh City
19:30 (UTC+7)	Scoring by quarter: 17–26, 19–17, 20–26, 13–15
FPT Play	Pts: Sumbry 16; Rebs: C. Raley-Ross, Sumbry 7 Asts: C. Raley-Ross 6	boxscore	Pts: Bryant 21; Rebs: Bryant 17; Asts: Jackson 7

==== Week 7 ====
2 July 2026	Cantho Catfish	80–81	Ho Chi Minh City Wings	Ho Xuan Huong Arena, Ho Chi Minh City
19:30 (UTC+7)	Scoring by quarter: 14–20, 19–21, 26–27, 21–13
FPT Play	Pts: Sumbry 18; Rebs: C. Raley-Ross, Sumbry 7 Asts: Thanh Tam 7	boxscore	Pts: T. Dang Khoa 21; Rebs: T. Dang Khoa, Quang 7 Asts: T. Dang Khoa 9

3 July 2026	Saigon Heat	86–71	Nha Trang Dolphins	MLC Arena, Ho Chi Minh City
19:30 (UTC+7)	Scoring by quarter: 17–15, 18–20, 24–21, 27–15
FPT Play	Pts: Anh Kiet 22; Rebs: Anh Kiet 13; Asts: Mayali 5	boxscore	Pts: Bryant, Nasanbat 15; Rebs: three players 9 Asts: Azzaya 4

4 July 2026	Cantho Catfish	100–95(OT)	Ho Chi Minh City Wings	Ho Xuan Huong Arena, Ho Chi Minh City
19:30 (UTC+7)	Scoring by quarter: 28–18, 19–20, 13–26, 21–17, Overtime: 19–14
FPT Play	Pts: Belguundariya 21; Rebs: Sumbry 12; Asts: Thanh Tam 4	boxscore	Pts: Zinser 30; Rebs: Zinser 9 Asts: Tykhonov 6

5 July 2026	Saigon Heat	93–84	Nha Trang Dolphins	MLC Arena, Ho Chi Minh City
19:30 (UTC+7)	Scoring by quarter: 24–19, 19–25, 27–22, 23–18
FPT Play	Pts: Mayali 32; Rebs: Andrews 15; Asts: Anh Kiet 6	boxscore	Pts: Nasanbat 18; Rebs: Jackson 11; Asts: Jackson 7

==== Week 8 ====
9 July 2026	Hanoi Buffaloes	98–92	Ho Chi Minh City Wings	Xuan Dinh Arena, Hanoi
19:30 (UTC+7)	Scoring by quarter: 31–26, 29–23, 18–25, 20–18
FPT Play	Pts: Bramah 32; Rebs: Bramah 13; Asts: Ramiro 6	boxscore	Pts: Zinser 21; Rebs: Tykhonov 13; Asts: T. Dang Khoa 7

10 July 2026	Saigon Heat	77–65	Danang Dragons	MLC Arena, Ho Chi Minh City
19:30 (UTC+7)	Scoring by quarter: 18–14, 20–17, 20–20, 19–14
FPT Play	Pts: B. Raley-Ross 30; Rebs: Wek 12; Asts: Mayali 5	boxscore	Pts: Albabeish, Soy 12; Rebs: Edo 10; Asts: Edo, Wood 5

11 July 2026	Hanoi Buffaloes	94–76	Ho Chi Minh City Wings	Xuan Dinh Arena, Hanoi
19:30 (UTC+7)	Scoring by quarter: 29–10, 16–23, 18–26, 31–17
FPT Play	Pts: Bramah 34; Rebs: Bramah 10; Asts: Williams 10	boxscore	Pts: Minh An 18; Rebs: Munkh-Ochir 9 Asts: Quang 5

12 July 2026	Saigon Heat	102–77	Danang Dragons	MLC Arena, Ho Chi Minh City
19:30 (UTC+7)	Scoring by quarter: 37–20, 18–29, 20–10, 27–18
FPT Play	Pts: B. Raley-Ross 21; Rebs: Phu Vinh 11; Asts: Anh Kiet 5	boxscore	Pts: Edo 23; Rebs: Edo 10; Asts: Albabeish, Wood 5

==== Week 9 ====
16 July 2026	Cantho Catfish	95–75	Danang Dragons	Ho Xuan Huong Arena, Ho Chi Minh City
19:30 (UTC+7)	Scoring by quarter: 15–19, 27–15, 32–19, 21–22
FPT Play	Pts: Sumbry 21; Rebs: Sumbry 11; Asts: Thanh Tam 9	boxscore	Pts: Wood 25; Rebs: Edo 10; Asts: Soy, Trong Tai 4

17 July 2026	Nha Trang Dolphins	89–92	Hanoi Buffaloes	Khanh Hoa Provincial Gymnasium, Nha Trang
19:30 (UTC+7)	Scoring by quarter: 32–25, 16–24, 15–21, 26–22
FPT Play	Pts: Bryant 31; Rebs: Bryant 12; Asts: Jackson 5	boxscore	Pts: Gholizadeh, Ramiro 23; Rebs: Gholizadeh 13; Asts: three players 2

18 July 2026	Cantho Catfish	88–85	Danang Dragons	Ho Xuan Huong Arena, Ho Chi Minh City
19:30 (UTC+7)	Scoring by quarter: 17–16, 29–21, 24–22, 18–26
FPT Play	Pts: C. Raley-Ross 23; Rebs: C. Raley-Ross, Trung Kien 7 Asts: C. Raley-Ross 5	boxscore	Pts: Edo 24; Rebs: Edo 12; Asts: Edo, Trong Tai 5

19 July 2026	Nha Trang Dolphins	109–108(OT)	Hanoi Buffaloes	Khanh Hoa Provincial Gymnasium, Nha Trang
19:30 (UTC+7)	Scoring by quarter: 25–28, 21–26, 25–21, 16–12, Overtime: 22–21
FPT Play	Pts: Jackson 26; Rebs: L. Dang Khoa 11; Asts: Jackson 7	boxscore	Pts: Bramah 31; Rebs: Bramah 18; Asts: Williams 7

==== Week 10 ====
23 July 2026	Nha Trang Dolphins	90–84	Cantho Catfish	Khanh Hoa Provincial Gymnasium, Nha Trang
19:30 (UTC+7)	Scoring by quarter: 24–16, 21–27, 25–16, 20–25
FPT Play	Pts: Bryant, Jackson 25; Rebs: Jackson 10; Asts: Huy Hoan 7	boxscore	Pts: C. Raley-Ross 16; Rebs: Sumbry 13; Asts: Thanh Tam 9

24 July 2026	Ho Chi Minh City Wings	97–76	Danang Dragons	Ho Xuan Huong Arena, Ho Chi Minh City
19:30 (UTC+7)	Scoring by quarter: 29–17, 16–21, 28–11, 24–27
FPT Play	Pts: Munkh-Ochir, Zinser 20; Rebs: Tykhonov 10; Asts: Quang Duy 12	boxscore	Pts: Soy 22; Rebs: Edo, Soy 7 Asts: Wood 7

25 July 2026	Nha Trang Dolphins	73–84	Cantho Catfish	Khanh Hoa Provincial Gymnasium, Nha Trang
19:30 (UTC+7)	Scoring by quarter: 10–27, 21–30, 21–6, 21–21
FPT Play	Pts: Azzaya, Jackson 17; Rebs: Nasanbat 11; Asts: Vinh Quang 7	boxscore	Pts: Sumbry 21; Rebs: Hien Tai, C. Raley-Ross 10; Asts: C. Raley-Ross 5

26 July 2026	Ho Chi Minh City Wings	102–86	Danang Dragons	Ho Xuan Huong Arena, Ho Chi Minh City
19:30 (UTC+7)	Scoring by quarter: 28–23, 17–17, 22–31, 35–15
FPT Play	Pts: Zinser 22; Rebs: Tykhonov, Zinser 10; Asts: Munkh-Ochir 8	boxscore	Pts: Soy 17; Rebs: Edo 11; Asts: three players 3

==== Week 11 ====
30 July 2026	Nha Trang Dolphins	85–71	Ho Chi Minh City Wings	Khanh Hoa Provincial Gymnasium, Nha Trang
19:30 (UTC+7)	Scoring by quarter: 23–11, 27–24, 15–12, 20–24
FPT Play	Pts: Azzaya 29; Rebs: Jackson 11; Asts: Jackson 6	boxscore	Pts: Munkh-Ochir 19; Rebs: Tykhonov 13; Asts: Courtney, Minh An 4

31 July 2026	Cantho Catfish	83–72	Saigon Heat	Ho Xuan Huong Arena, Ho Chi Minh City
19:30 (UTC+7)	Scoring by quarter: 21–19, 21–25, 21–14, 20–14
FPT Play	Pts: Sumbry 28; Rebs: Sumbry 11; Asts: Thanh Tam 8	boxscore	Pts: Wek 33; Rebs: Wek 18; Asts: Phu Vinh 5

1 August 2026	Nha Trang Dolphins	88–79	Ho Chi Minh City Wings	Khanh Hoa Provincial Gymnasium, Nha Trang
19:30 (UTC+7)	Scoring by quarter: 21–28, 21–18, 29–18, 17–15
FPT Play	Pts: Huy Hoan 21; Rebs: Bryant 13; Asts: Jackson 7	boxscore	Pts: Tykhonov 19; Rebs: Tykhonov 17; Asts: Munkh-Ochir 7

2 August 2026	Cantho Catfish	75–77	Saigon Heat	Ho Xuan Huong Arena, Ho Chi Minh City
19:30 (UTC+7)	Scoring by quarter: 18–17, 15–23, 23–17, 19–20
FPT Play	Pts: Sumbry 17; Rebs: Sumbry 11; Asts: three players 3	boxscore	Pts: B. Raley-Ross 22; Rebs: Phu Vinh 10; Asts: Mayali 5

==== Week 12 ====
6 August 2026	Ho Chi Minh City Wings	80–83	Saigon Heat	Ho Xuan Huong Arena, Ho Chi Minh City
19:30 (UTC+7)	Scoring by quarter: 17–19, 25–26, 23–18, 15–20
FPT Play	Pts: Munkh-Ochir 25; Rebs: Courtney 12; Asts: Minh An 5	boxscore	Pts: B. Raley-Ross 21; Rebs: Phu Vinh 13; Asts: Mayali 4

7 August 2026	Hanoi Buffaloes	117–89	Danang Dragons	Xuan Dinh Arena, Hanoi
19:30 (UTC+7)	Scoring by quarter: 30–17, 34–23, 23–25, 30–24
FPT Play	Pts: Bramah 32; Rebs: Bramah 12; Asts: Ramiro 7	boxscore	Pts: Albabiesh 31; Rebs: Albabiesh 10; Asts: Wood 4

8 August 2026	Ho Chi Minh City Wings	96–77	Saigon Heat	Ho Xuan Huong Arena, Ho Chi Minh City
19:30 (UTC+7)	Scoring by quarter: 26–23, 25–29, 25–15, 20–10
FPT Play	Pts: Zinser 34; Rebs: Tykhonov 8 Asts: Zinser 5	boxscore	Pts: Mayali 21; Rebs: Phu Vinh 12; Asts: Mayali 4

9 August 2026	Hanoi Buffaloes	120–91	Danang Dragons	Xuan Dinh Arena, Hanoi
19:30 (UTC+7)	Scoring by quarter: 33–18, 31–16, 31–35, 25–22
FPT Play	Pts: Bramah 34; Rebs: Bramah 10; Asts: Williams 5	boxscore	Pts: Albabeish 24; Rebs: Albabeish 11; Asts: Wood 7

==== Week 13 ====
13 August 2026	Danang Dragons	90–94	Nha Trang Dolphins	5th Military Region Arena, Da Nang
19:30 (UTC+7)	Scoring by quarter: 28–26, 12–25, 36–21, 14–22
FPT Play	Pts: Albabeish 22; Rebs: Albabeish 13; Asts: Wood 13	boxscore	Pts: Azzaya 26; Rebs: Bryant 13; Asts: Jackson 10

14 August 2026	Hanoi Buffaloes	91–73	Cantho Catfish	Xuan Dinh Arena, Hanoi
19:30 (UTC+7)	Scoring by quarter: 26–21, 24–18, 25–16, 16–18
FPT Play	Pts: Bramah 23; Rebs: Gholizadeh 11; Asts: Bramah 7	boxscore	Pts: C. Raley-Ross 23; Rebs: Sumbry 12; Asts: Belguundariya 4

15 August 2026	Danang Dragons	78–112	Nha Trang Dolphins	5th Military Region Arena, Da Nang
19:30 (UTC+7)	Scoring by quarter: 22–31, 14–28, 20–29, 22–24
FPT Play	Pts: Soy 25; Rebs: Albabeish 16; Asts: Soy 4	boxscore	Pts: Jackson 25; Rebs: Jackson 11; Asts: Azzaya, Quang Anh 5

16 August 2026	Hanoi Buffaloes	109–94	Cantho Catfish	Xuan Dinh Arena, Hanoi
19:30 (UTC+7)	Scoring by quarter: 29–18, 30–20, 34–26, 16–30
FPT Play	Pts: Bramah 34; Rebs: Bramah 11; Asts: Ramiro 4	boxscore	Pts: Sumbry 20; Rebs: Sumbry 16; Asts: Belguundariya, Sumbry 5

==== Week 14 ====
20 August 2026	Nha Trang Dolphins	99–78	Danang Dragons	Khanh Hoa Provincial Gymnasium, Nha Trang
19:30 (UTC+7)	Scoring by quarter: 18–23, 33–21, 19–16, 29–18
FPT Play	Pts: Jackson 23; Rebs: Nasanbat 9 Asts: Azzaya, Jackson 4	boxscore	Pts: Soy 25; Rebs: Albabeish 14; Asts: Soy 5

21 August 2026	Saigon Heat	71–76	Ho Chi Minh City Wings	MLC Arena, Ho Chi Minh City
19:30 (UTC+7)	Scoring by quarter: 15–22, 25–25, 6–15, 25–14
FPT Play	Pts: B. Raley-Ross 28; Rebs: Phu Vinh, Wek 12; Asts: Truc Nhan 7	boxscore	Pts: Quang Duy 14; Rebs: Tykhonov 13; Asts: Courtney 5

22 August 2026	Nha Trang Dolphins	105–91	Danang Dragons	Khanh Hoa Provincial Gymnasium, Nha Trang
19:30 (UTC+7)	Scoring by quarter: 25–28, 27–18, 19–20, 34–25
FPT Play	Pts: Jackson 22; Rebs: Jackson 12; Asts: Jackson 8	boxscore	Pts: Edo 27; Rebs: Albabeish 18; Asts: Trong Tai, Albabeish 5

23 August 2026	Saigon Heat	74–66	Ho Chi Minh City Wings	MLC Arena, Ho Chi Minh City
19:30 (UTC+7)	Scoring by quarter: 20–11, 24–27, 16–15, 14–13
FPT Play	Pts: B. Raley-Ross 21; Rebs: Wek 13; Asts: Anh Kiet 4	boxscore	Pts: Courtney 16; Rebs: Zinser 6 Asts: Tykhonov 4

==== Week 15 ====
27 August 2026	Ho Chi Minh City Wings	101–77	Cantho Catfish	Ho Xuan Huong Arena, Ho Chi Minh City
19:30 (UTC+7)	Scoring by quarter: 21–20, 21–16, 26–22, 33–19
FPT Play	Pts: Zinser 41; Rebs: Tykhonov 12; Asts: Courtney, Minh An 5	boxscore	Pts: C. Raley-Ross 23; Rebs: C. Raley-Ross, Sumbry 8 Asts: Sumbry 4

28 August 2026	Hanoi Buffaloes	90–82	Saigon Heat	Xuan Dinh Arena, Hanoi
19:30 (UTC+7)	Scoring by quarter: 24–20, 16–26, 35–15, 15–21
FPT Play	Pts: Bramah 25; Rebs: Gholizadeh 13; Asts: Ramiro 4	boxscore	Pts: B. Raley-Ross 19; Rebs: Kavazian 12; Asts: Phuc Vinh, B. Raley-Ross 4

29 August 2026	Ho Chi Minh City Wings	95–91	Cantho Catfish	Ho Xuan Huong Arena, Ho Chi Minh City
19:30 (UTC+7)	Scoring by quarter: 17–22, 18–27, 35–19, 25–23
FPT Play	Pts: Zinser 23; Rebs: Tykhonov 8 Asts: Zinser 10	boxscore	Pts: Sumbry 20; Rebs: Sumbry 15; Asts: C. Raley-Ross 6

30 August 2026	Hanoi Buffaloes	92–76	Saigon Heat	Xuan Dinh Arena, Hanoi
19:30 (UTC+7)	Scoring by quarter: 25–13, 26–19, 26–19, 15–25
FPT Play	Pts: Williams 24; Rebs: Gholizadeh, Tien Cong 7 Asts: Williams 9	boxscore	Pts: Kavazian 21; Rebs: Kavazian 20; Asts: Phuc Vinh 5

=== Statistics ===
==== Individual statistic leaders ====
Category	Player	Team	Statistic
Points per game	(United States) AJ Bramah	Hanoi Buffaloes	30.2
Rebounds per game	(United States) AJ Bramah	Hanoi Buffaloes	12.8
Assists per game	(United States) Brandon Wood	Danang Dragons	5.2
Steals per game	(United States) Corey Raley-Ross	Cantho Catfish	1.9
Blocks per game	(United States) Jalon Andrews	Saigon Heat	1.8
FG%	(United States) AJ Bramah	Hanoi Buffaloes	54.1%
3P%	(Vietnam) Huynh Vinh Quang	Nha Trang Dolphins	45.5%

==== Team statistic leaders ====
Category	Team	Statistic
Points per game	Hanoi Buffaloes	99.7
Rebounds per game	Saigon Heat	42.7
Assists per game	Ho Chi Minh City Wings	19.3
Steals per game	Hanoi Buffaloes	9.8
Blocks per game	Saigon Heat	3.0
FG%	Hanoi Buffaloes	46.2%
FT%	Nha Trang Dolphins	68.0%
3P%	Ho Chi Minh City Wings	32.5%

== Playoffs ==
The playoffs began on 5 September.

=== Bracket ===
Semifinals (Best of 3)
**1**	**Hanoi Buffaloes**	**2**
4	Ho Chi Minh City Wings	0
**2**	**Saigon Heat**	**2**
3	Nha Trang Dolphins	0

Finals (Best of 5)
1	Hanoi Buffaloes	1
**2**	**Saigon Heat**	**3**

Bold: Series winner
Italic: Team with home-court advantage

=== Semifinals ===
==== (1) Hanoi Buffaloes vs. (4) Ho Chi Minh City Wings ====
FPT Play

5 September 2026
19:30 (UTC+7)

boxscore

**Hanoi Buffaloes**	**93**–76	Ho Chi Minh City Wings
Scoring by quarter: **23**–20, 16–**18**, **25**–23, **29**–15
Pts: Bramah, Gholizadeh 20; Rebs: Bramah 22; Asts: Bramah 8		Pts: Quang 24; Rebs: Zinser 12; Asts: Zinser 5
**Hanoi leads series, 1–0**

Xuan Dinh Arena, Hanoi
Referees: Reynaldo Yante, Kim Cheong-soo, Le Truong Giang

FPT Play

9 September 2026
19:30 (UTC+7)

boxscore

Ho Chi Minh City Wings	96–**105** (OT)	**Hanoi Buffaloes**
Scoring by quarter: 14–**23**, **30**–17, 23–**28**, **24**–23, Overtime: 5–**14**
Pts: Quang Duy 24; Rebs: Tykhonov 16; Asts: Minh An 10		Pts: Gholizadeh, Ramiro 27; Rebs: Bramah, Ramiro 11; Asts: Bramah 7
**Hanoi wins series, 2–0**

Ho Xuan Huong Arena, Ho Chi Minh City
Referees: Arnolfo Bermeo, Kim Cheong-soo, Le Quoc Tuan

==== (2) Saigon Heat vs. (3) Nha Trang Dolphins ====
FPT Play

6 September 2026
19:30 (UTC+7)

boxscore

**Saigon Heat**	**88**–85	Nha Trang Dolphins
Scoring by quarter: 19–19, **31**–24, 13–**21**, **25**–21
Pts: Mayali 22; Rebs: Phu Vinh 11; Asts: Anh Kiet 7		Pts: Jackson 23; Rebs: Bryant, Jackson 10; Asts: Jackson 4
**Saigon leads series, 1–0**

MLC Arena, Ho Chi Minh City
Referees: Lee Dong-hyeon, Arnolfo Bermeo, Le Pham Trung Kien

FPT Play

10 September 2026
19:30 (UTC+7)

boxscore

Nha Trang Dolphins	75–**77**	**Saigon Heat**
Scoring by quarter: 18–**20**, 19–19, 15–**24**, **23**–14
Pts: Bryant 19; Rebs: Jackson 13; Asts: Jackson 10		Pts: B. Raley-Ross 16; Rebs: Phu Vinh 14; Asts: B. Raley-Ross 7
**Saigon wins series, 2–0**

Khanh Hoa Provincial Gymnasium, Nha Trang
Referees: Reynaldo Yante, Lee Dong-yeon, Trieu Chi Thanh

=== Finals ===
==== (1) Hanoi Buffaloes vs. (2) Saigon Heat ====
FPT Play

19 September 2026
19:30 (UTC+7)

boxscore

Hanoi Buffaloes	82–**88**	**Saigon Heat**
Scoring by quarter: **19**–17, 21–21, 13–**30**, **29**–20
Pts: Bramah 28; Rebs: Bramah 16; Asts: Bramah 4		Pts: B. Raley-Ross 24; Rebs: Wek 19; Asts: B. Raley-Ross 4
**Saigon leads series, 1–0**

Xuan Dinh Arena, Hanoi
Referees: Owe Shiong Chan, Lee Dong-hyeon, Le Pham Trung Kien

FPT Play

22 September 2026
19:30 (UTC+7)

boxscore

**Saigon Heat**	**99**–74	Hanoi Buffaloes
Scoring by quarter: **19**–13, **26**–19, 21–**22**, **33**–20
Pts: Mayali 25; Rebs: Wek 14; Asts: three players 5		Pts: Bramah 31; Rebs: Bramah 12; Asts: Bramah 4
**Saigon leads series, 2–0**

MLC Arena, Ho Chi Minh City
Referees: Owe Shiong Chan, Arnolfo Bermeo, Le Truong Giang

FPT Play

24 September 2026
19:30 (UTC+7)

boxscore

Saigon Heat	80–**97**	**Hanoi Buffaloes**
Scoring by quarter: **28**–18, 23–**26**, 16–**24**, 13–**29**
Pts: B. Raley-Ross 23; Rebs: Phu Vinh 9 Asts: Phu Vinh, B. Raley-Ross 4		Pts: Bramah 30; Rebs: Bramah 20; Asts: Bramah 5
**Saigon leads series, 2–1**

MLC Arena, Ho Chi Minh City
Referees: Reynaldo Yante, Lee Dong-hyeon, Trieu Chi Thanh

FPT Play

27 September 2026
19:30 (UTC+7)

boxscore

Hanoi Buffaloes	67–**84**	**Saigon Heat**
Scoring by quarter: 16–**27**, 14–**17**, 20–**25**, **17**–15
Pts: Bramah 20; Rebs: Ramiro 10; Asts: Ramiro, Williams 3		Pts: B. Raley-Ross 24; Rebs: Wek 11; Asts: Anh Kiet 5
**Saigon wins series, 3–1**

Xuan Dinh Arena, Hanoi
Referees: Arnolfo Bermeo, Lee Dong-hyeon, Le Pham Trung Kien

== Awards ==
- Most Valuable Player: AJ Bramah (Hanoi Buffaloes)
- Domestic Player of the Year: Nguyen Huynh Phu Vinh (Saigon Heat)
- Asian Heritage Player of the Year: Lian Ramiro (Hanoi Buffaloes)
- Defensive Player of the Year: AJ Bramah (Hanoi Buffaloes)
- Most Improved Player: Le Quang (Ho Chi Minh City Wings)
- Sixth Man of the Year: Le Khac Dang Khoa (Nha Trang Dolphins)
- Rookie of the Year: Nguyen Hong Son (Ho Chi Minh City Wings)
- Coach of the Year: Matt Van Pelt (Hanoi Buffaloes)
- Fan Favorite Player of the Year: Dinh Thanh Tam (Hanoi Buffaloes)
- Dunk of the Year: AJ Bramah (Hanoi Buffaloes)
- Basket of the Year: Ariyon Williams (Hanoi Buffaloes)
- Block of the Year: Tran Dang Khoa (Ho Chi Minh City Wings)
