= 2025 VBA season =

Vietnam Basketball Association season

Vietnam Basketball Association
- Season: 2025
- Duration: 16 May – 20 September 2025
- Games played: 18
- Teams: 7
- TV partner(s): Vietnam: On Sports; Online: Facebook Watch; TikTok; YouTube

Regular season
- Supporter's Cup: Hanoi Buffaloes (1st title)

Finals
- Champions: Hanoi Buffaloes (1st title)
- Runners-up: Nha Trang Dolphins

The 2025 VBA season (Vietnamese: VBA mùa giải 2025) was the tenth season of the Vietnam Basketball Association. The regular season began on 16 May and ended on 31 August.

The Saigon Heat entered the season as the defending champions.

== Teams ==
Locations of the VBA teams
Location of teams based in Ho Chi Minh City

The same six teams from the previous season returned for the current season, are joined by a team filled with players from the Philippines. The league returned to a home/away format with all of the Vietnamese teams except for the Cantho Catfish returning to their home markets.

=== Locations, venues and personnel ===
Team	Location	Arena	Head coach
Danang Dragons	Da Nang	5th Military Region Arena	(Vietnam) Hoang The Vinh
Hanoi Buffaloes	Hanoi	Tay Ho Sports Complex	(United States) Matt Van Pelt
V Islanders	Hanoi	Hanoi Children's Palace Gymnasium	(Philippines) Jose Garcia
Cantho Catfish	Ho Chi Minh City	Tan Binh Gymnasium	(Vietnam) Phan Thanh Canh
Ho Chi Minh City Wings	Ho Chi Minh City	Ho Xuan Huong Arena	(Vietnam) Le Tran Minh Nghia
Saigon Heat	Ho Chi Minh City	CIS Arena	(United Kingdom) David Grice
Nha Trang Dolphins	Nha Trang	Khanh Hoa Provincial Gymnasium	(United States) Todd Purves

=== Coaching Transactions ===
Coaching changes
Team	2024 season	2025 season
Off-season
Cantho Catfish	(Vietnam) Le Tran Minh Nghia	(Vietnam) Phan Thanh Canh
Danang Dragons	(United States) Todd Purves	(Vietnam) Hoang The Vinh
Hanoi Buffaloes	(United States) Erik Rashad	(United States) Matt Van Pelt
Nha Trang Dolphins	(United States) Chris Daleo	(United States) Todd Purves
Ho Chi Minh City Wings	(United States) Lee Tao Dana	(Philippines) Argel Mendoza
In-season
Ho Chi Minh City Wings	(Philippines) Argel Mendoza	(Vietnam) Le Tran Minh Nghia

==== In-season ====
- On 10 July 2025, the Ho Chi Minh City Wings named Le Tran Minh Nghia as head coach after Argel Mendoza was relieved of the duties.

== Foreign players ==
Teams are allowed to register two foreign, one Vietnamese heritage, one local+, and one Asian heritage. Heritage players are designated players who have Vietnamese heritage or have been naturalized. Local+ players are legacy heritage players that have played previously in the VBA. Heritage and local+ players do not count against the teams allotted foreign player slots.

Team	Foreign 1	Foreign 2	Asian	Heritage	Local+	Replaced
Cantho Catfish	(United States) DaJuan Madden	(United States) Devin Peterson	(Philippines) Albert Bordeos	(United States) Dominique Tham	(Canada) (Vietnam) Michael Soy	(United States) Kevin Le (United States) Malek Green
Danang Dragons	(Nigeria) Karachi Edo	(United States) Timothy Simmons	(Mongolia) Ganbat Chinbold	(United States) Kyan Washington		
Hanoi Buffaloes	(United States) Tamyrik Fields	(United States) DaQuan Bracey	(Philippines) Lian Ramiro		(United States) (Vietnam) Tam Dinh	(United States) Taishuan Johnson
Ho Chi Minh City Wings	(Ukraine) Yevgen Sakhniuk	(United States) Dakota Zinser	(Mongolia) Sanchir Tsagaanbaatar	(United States) Nathan Huynh	(United States) (Vietnam) Khoa Tran	(Philippines) Christian Rios (Philippines) Kobe Pableo (United States) Darius Austin (Philippines) James Martinez
Nha Trang Dolphins	(United States) Mykal Jenkins	(United States) Jalyn Richardson	(Mongolia) Munkhtur Khureltogoo	(United States) Max Allen		(United States) Bryan Nguyen (United States) John Fields
Saigon Heat	(United States) Alfred Hollins	(United States) Davon Dillard	(Mongolia) Temuulen Chingis		(Denmark) (Vietnam) Tim Waale	
V Islanders	(United States) Jermale Jones	(France) Alioune Tew				(United States) Anthony January

== Regular season ==
The regular season began on 16 May 2025.

=== Standings ===
Pos	Team	Pld	W	L	PF	PA	PD	PCT	Qualification or relegation
1	Hanoi Buffaloes (Q)	18	17	1	1741	1518	+223	.944	Regular season champions Qualification to playoffs
2	Nha Trang Dolphins (Q)	18	12	6	1514	1376	+138	.667	Qualification to playoffs
3	Cantho Catfish (Q)	18	11	7	1357	1271	+86	.611	Qualification to playoffs
4	Saigon Heat (Q)	18	11	7	1461	1349	+112	.611	Qualification to playoffs
5	Danang Dragons (E)	18	8	10	1528	1555	−27	.444	
6	Ho Chi Minh City Wings (E)	18	2	16	1354	1618	−264	.111	
7	V Islanders	18	2	16	1094	1362	−268	.111	Disqualified

Source: VBA
(E) Eliminated; (Q) Qualified for the phase indicated

=== Results ===
Home \ Away	CTC	DND	HNB	HCM	NTD	SGH	VIS
Cantho Catfish		86–76	77–86	123–105	95–66	98–90	20–0
Danang Dragons	77–64		76–96	101–66	70–96	87–94	103–92
Hanoi Buffaloes	96–94	92–71		110–60	93–81	89–87	109–97
Ho Chi Minh City Wings	65–76	71–87	90–100		77–123	69–88	20–0
Nha Trang Dolphins	81–77	86–72	76–77	89–81		80–70	20–0
Saigon Heat	75–77	83–85	93–85	80–72	96–68		114–91
V Islanders	86–96	82–96	73–94	96–72	75–87	0–20	

Source: Results
Legend: Blue = home team win; Red = away team win.
Matches with lighter background shading were decided after overtime.

Home \ Away	CTC	DND	HNB	HCM	NTD	SGH	VIS
Cantho Catfish		76–57	73–89				20–0
Danang Dragons			121–132	113–87	76–94		
Hanoi Buffaloes					92–87	80–71	113–96
Ho Chi Minh City Wings	64–71		95–108			96–73	
Nha Trang Dolphins	88–66			87–81		88–91	
Saigon Heat	70–68	80–68					86–48
V Islanders		78–92		93–83	87–117		

Source: Results
Legend: Blue = home team win; Red = away team win.
Matches with lighter background shading were decided after overtime.

=== Statistics ===
==== Individual statistic leaders ====
Category	Player	Team	Statistic
Points per game	(United States) Malek Green	Cantho Catfish	32.3
Rebounds per game	(United States) Darrius Austin	Ho Chi Minh City Wings	16.4
Assists per game	(United States) Timothy Simmons	Danang Dragons	7.2
Steals per game	(United States) DaJuan Madden	Cantho Catfish	3.8
Blocks per game	(United States) Darrius Austin	Ho Chi Minh City Wings	2.3
FG%	(United States) Mykal Jenkins	Nha Trang Dolphins	66.4%
3P%	(Vietnam) Huynh Vinh Quang	Nha Trang Dolphins	45.6%

==== Team statistic leaders ====
Category	Team	Statistic
Points per game	Hanoi Buffaloes	96.7
Rebounds per game	Nha Trang Dolphins	42.1
Assists per game	Danang Dragons	20.4
Steals per game	Hanoi Buffaloes	10.8
Blocks per game	V Islanders	3.2
FG%	Nha Trang Dolphins	45.9%
FT%	Nha Trang Dolphins	65.3%
3P%	Hanoi Buffaloes	31.3%

== Playoffs ==
=== Bracket ===
Semifinals (Best-of-3)
1	Hanoi Buffaloes	83	108
4	Saigon Heat	79	95
2	Nha Trang Dolphins	84	78	105
3	Cantho Catfish	80	86	93

Finals (Best-of-5)
1	Hanoi Buffaloes	82	92	95
2	Nha Trang Dolphins	76	86	80

== Notable occurrences ==
- On 22 May 2025, James Martinez broke the record for most three-point field goals made (9) in a game vs the Nha Trang Dolphins.
- On 26 May 2025, the Hanoi Buffaloes defeated the Danang Dragons in the first triple overtime game in league history.
