= 2023 VBA season =

Vietnam Basketball Association season

Vietnam Basketball Association
- Season: 2023
- Duration: 10 June – 28 September
- Games played: 18
- Teams: 7
- TV partners: Vietnam: On Sports; Online: Facebook Watch; TikTok; YouTube

Regular season
- Top seed: Saigon Heat

Finals
- Champions: Saigon Heat
- Runners-up: Nha Trang Dolphins
- Finals MVP: Kentrell Barkley (Saigon)

Statistical leaders
Points	Kentrell Barkley (Saigon)	30.2
Rebounds	John Fields (Thang Long)	17.7
Assists	Madarious Gibbs (Nha Trang)	8.5

The 2023 VBA season (Vietnamese: VBA mùa giải 2023) was the eighth season of the Vietnam Basketball Association. The regular season began on 10 June and ended on 3 September. The playoffs began on 7 September, and ended on 28 September, with the Saigon Heat clinching their 4th straight title after defeating the Nha Trang Dolphins in 4 games in the Finals.

The regular season started with all seven teams playing a round-robin tournament at a centralized venue in Hanoi. The remainder of the regular season was played in the traditional home and away format.

== Teams ==
All seven teams from the 2022 season continued on in 2023. The season started with the first quarter of the schedule played at a central hub in Hanoi. The remainder of the schedule was played in the traditional home-and-away format.

=== Venues and locations ===
Locations of the VBA teams

Team	Home city	Arena
Cantho Catfish	Can Tho	Da Nang Can Tho Arena
Danang Dragons	Da Nang	Son Tra Arena
Hanoi Buffaloes	Hanoi	Hoang Mai Arena
Hochiminh City Wings	Ho Chi Minh City	Ho Xuan Huong Arena
Nha Trang Dolphins	Nha Trang	Nha Trang University Arena
Saigon Heat	Ho Chi Minh City	CIS Arena
Thang Long Warriors	Hanoi	Tay Ho Arena

=== Personnel and sponsorship ===
Team	Head coach	Kit maker
Cantho Catfish	(United States) Jordan Collins	Anta
Danang Dragons	(United States) Todd Purves	Anta
Hanoi Buffaloes	(United States) Erik Rashad	Anta
Hochiminh City Wings	(United States) Erik Olson	Anta
Nha Trang Dolphins	(Serbia) Predrag Lukic	Anta
Saigon Heat	(United States) Matt Van Pelt	Anta
Thang Long Warriors	(United States) Chris Daleo	Anta

=== Coaching Transactions ===
Coaching changes
Team	2022 season	2023 season
Off-season
Cantho Catfish	Leonardo Pérez	Jordan Collins
Hanoi Buffaloes	Eric Weissling	Erik Rashad
Thang Long Warriors	Predrag Lukic	Chris Daleo
Nha Trang Dolphins	Todd Purves	Predrag Lukic
Danang Dragons	Phan Thanh Canh	Alberto Antuña Leal
Danang Dragons	Alberto Antuña Leal	Todd Purves

== Foreign players ==
Teams are allowed to register two foreign players and one heritage player. Heritage players are designated players who have Vietnamese heritage or have been naturalized. They do not count against the teams allotted foreign player slots.

Team	Player 1	Player 2	Heritage Player	Replaced
Cantho Catfish	(United States) Brachon Griffin	(United States) Joshua Keyes	(Canada) Michael Soy	(United States) Ja Morgan (United States) DeAngelo Hamilton
Danang Dragons	(United States) Jermaine Marrow	(United States) Jairus Holder	(Canada) William Tran	(Ukraine) Yevgen Sakhniuk
Hanoi Buffaloes	(United States) Udun Osakue	(United States) Lenny Daniel	(United States) Tam Dinh	(United States) Russell Smith (United States) Anthony January
Hochiminh City Wings	(United States) Jeremy Smith	(Ukraine) Yevgen Sakhniuk	(Netherlands) Vincent Nguyen	(United States) Amir Williams
Nha Trang Dolphins	(United States) Madarious Gibbs	(United States) Robert Sampson	(United States) Dominique Tham	
Saigon Heat	(United States) Kentrell Barkley		(United States) Hassan Thomas	
Thang Long Warriors	(United States) John Fields	(United States) Sameen Swint	(United States) Justin Young	

== Regular season ==
=== League table ===
Pos	Team	Pld	W	L	PF	PA	PD	Qualification or relegation
1	Saigon Heat	18	14	4	1578	1462	+116	Qualification to playoffs
2	Hanoi Buffaloes	18	13	5	1545	1448	+97	Qualification to playoffs
3	Nha Trang Dolphins	18	12	6	1571	1473	+98	Qualification to playoffs
4	Thang Long Warriors	18	11	7	1567	1534	+33	Qualification to playoffs
5	Cantho Catfish	18	6	12	1484	1548	−64	
6	Ho Chi Minh City Wings	18	6	12	1483	1555	−72	
7	Danang Dragons	18	1	17	1489	1697	−208	

Source: VBA

=== Results ===
Home \ Away	CTC	DND	HNB	HCM	NTD	SGH	TLW	CTC	DND	HNB	HCM	NTD	SGH	TLW
Cantho Catfish		89–87	70–59	81–86	87–96	83–89	98–103		97–88			78–80	72–79	
Danang Dragons	80–99		74–92	78–91	76–86	76–86	94–106			83–115	104–83			73–94
Hanoi Buffaloes	86–72	88–69		98–93	60–97	71–85	90–95	95–81				88–74	81–79	
Hochiminh City Wings	66–78	101–70	81–89		90–87	78–80	77–80	89–95		63–94				95–89
Nha Trang Dolphins	77–70	88–77	80–72	72–77		79–85	100–73		108–105		93–83		99–95	
Saigon Heat	111–70	97–91	83–92	82–67	94–90		91–88		86–82		98–91			90–70
Thang Long Warriors	83–78	91–82	91–93	87–72	77–82	82–68		94–86		78–82		86–83		

Source: Results
Legend: Blue = home team win; Red = away team win.
Matches with lighter background shading were decided after overtime.

== Playoffs ==
The playoffs began on 7 September.

=== Bracket ===
Semifinals
1 Saigon Heat	2
4 Thang Long Warriors	0
2 Hanoi Buffaloes	0
3 Nha Trang Dolphins	2

Finals
1 Saigon Heat	3
3 Nha Trang Dolphins	1

==== Semifinals ====
Team 1	Series	Team 2	Game 1	Game 2	Game 3
(1) Saigon Heat	2–0	(4) Thang Long Warriors	89–79	97–76	–
(2) Hanoi Buffaloes	0–2	(3) Nha Trang Dolphins	61–85	67–82	–

==== Finals ====
Team 1	Series	Team 2	Game 1	Game 2	Game 3	Game 4	Game 5
(1) Saigon Heat	3–1	(3) Nha Trang Dolphins	98–95 (OT)	77–72	74–95	81–76 (OT)	–

== Statistics ==
=== Individual statistic leaders ===
Category	Player	Team	Statistic
Points per game	Kentrell Barkley	Saigon Heat	30.2
Assists per game	Madarious Gibbs	Nha Trang Dolphins	8.5
Rebounds per game	John Fields	Thang Long Warriors	17.7
Steals per game	Tam Dinh	Hanoi Buffaloes	2.8
Blocks per game	DeAngelo Hamilton	Cantho Catfish	2.8
Field goal percentage	John Fields	Thang Long Warriors	70.5%
Three point FG percentage	Vo Kim Ban	Saigon Heat	42.2%

=== Team statistic leaders ===
Category	Team	Statistic
Points per game	Saigon Heat	87.7
Rebounds per game	Saigon Heat	39.2
Assists per game	Saigon Heat	20.6
Steals per game	Hanoi Buffaloes	13.3
Blocks per game	Nha Trang Dolphins	4.0
Turnovers per game	Ho Chi Minh City Wings	17.8
Fouls per game	Thang Long Warriors	22.0
FG%	Ho Chi Minh City Wings	45.7%
3P%	Saigon Heat	34.5%
FT%	Hanoi Buffaloes	69.5%

== Awards ==
=== Yearly awards ===
2023 VBA Awards
Award	Recipient	Team	Ref
Most Valuable Player	Kentrell Barkley	Saigon Heat	
Most Valuable Local Player	Nguyen Huynh Phu Vinh	Saigon Heat	
Most Valuable Heritage Player	Dominique Tham	Nha Trang Dolphins	
Most Popular Player of the Year	Vo Kim Ban	Saigon Heat	
Defensive Player of the Year	John Fields	Thang Long Warriors	
Rookie of the Year	Nguyen Hoang Phuc	Nha Trang Dolphins	
Sixth Man of the Year	Son Minh Tam	Nha Trang Dolphins	
Most Improved Player	Tran Van Trung	Ho Chi Minh City Wings	
Coach of the Year	Matt Van Pelt	Saigon Heat	
