= Khoa Tran =

Vietnamese-American basketball player

Trần Đăng Khoa
No. 8 – Ho Chi Minh City Wings
- Position: Point guard
- League: VBA

Personal information
- Born: January 21, 1997 (age 29) Ho Chi Minh City, Vietnam
- Listed height: 6 ft 0 in (1.83 m)
- Listed weight: 159 lb (72 kg)

Career information
- High school: Kentlake (Kent, Washington)
- College: Washington State
- NBA draft: 2016: undrafted
- Playing career: 2016–present

Career history
- 2016–2019: Saigon Heat
- 2017: →Danang Dragons
- 2019–2020: Saigon Heat (ABL)
- 2020: Nha Trang Dolphins
- 2021: Team Vietnam
- 2022: Saigon Heat
- 2024–present: Ho Chi Minh City Wings

Career highlights
- VBA Rising Star (2016)
Medals
Men's basketball
Representing Vietnam
Southeast Asian Games
Bronze medal – third place	2019 Philippines	Team
Men's 3x3 basketball
Representing Vietnam
Southeast Asian Games
Bronze medal – third place	2019 Philippines	Team

Khoa Tran (Vietnamese: Trần Đăng Khoa; January 21, 1997) is a Vietnamese-American professional basketball player for the Ho Chi Minh City Wings of the VBA. He is also known as "Mr. Wiggle" in Vietnam.

== Pro career ==
=== Saigon Heat (2016–present) ===
With the formation for the Vietnam Basketball Association, Khoa joined the Saigon Heat side for the league's inaugural season. At the conclusion of the season, he averaged 11.1 points, 3.6 rebounds, and 4.9 assists per game.

== Career statistics ==
Legend
GP	Games played	GS	Games started	MPG	Minutes per game
FG%	Field goal percentage	3P%	3-point field goal percentage	FT%	Free throw percentage
RPG	Rebounds per game	APG	Assists per game	SPG	Steals per game
BPG	Blocks per game	PPG	Points per game	**Bold**	Career high

=== VBA ===
==== Regular season ====
Year	Team	GP	GS	MPG	FG%	3P%	FT%	RPG	APG	SPG	BPG	PPG
2016	Saigon	12	9	29.3	.460	.321	.542	3.9	4.8	1.3	.1	11.3
2017	Danang	9	7	27.2	.420	.111	.804	6.7	2.6	2.1	.0	14.9
2018	Saigon	14	13	33.4	.400	**.357**	.681	**7.9**	4.5	**3.2**	.1	16.8
2019	Saigon	8	5	25.4	.330	.200	.733	6.0	4.4	3.0	.0	13.3
2020	Nha Trang	11	11	35.3	.403	.230	.763	5.0	3.9	3.0	.3	**18.5**
2021	Vietnam	1	0	21.5	.316	.250	**1.000**	5.0	4.0	2.0	.0	15.0
2022	Saigon	5	3	22.7	**.487**	.300	.714	4.8	2.4	1.6	**.4**	9.8
2024	Ho Chi Minh City	**16**	**16**	**37.5**	.432	.290	.511	5.2	**5.9**	2.9	**.4**	17.6
Career		76	64	31.5	.412	.271	.679	5.7	4.4	2.6	.2	15.3

==== Playoffs ====
Year	Team	GP	GS	MPG	FG%	3P%	FT%	RPG	APG	SPG	BPG	PPG
2016	Saigon	2	2	30.3	.368	**.375**	**1.000**	2.0	5.5	.5	.5	9.5
2018	Saigon	2	2	31.7	.424	.300	.500	5.0	5.5	**4.0**	.0	16.0
2021	Vietnam	1	1	**36.5**	**.526**	.364	.286	5.0	**10.0**	.0	**1.0**	**26.0**
2022	Saigon	**5**	**5**	28.7	.385	.333	.750	**6.0**	3.6	.8	.0	9.4
Career		10	10	30.4	.418	.340	.609	4.9	5.0	1.3	.2	12.4

== Awards and honors ==
=== VBA ===
- Rising Star: 2016
