= Mike Bell (basketball) =

American basketball player

Free agent
- Position: Power forward / center

Personal information
- Born: August 11, 1982 (age 44) Las Vegas, Nevada, U.S.
- Listed height: 6 ft 9 in (2.06 m)
- Listed weight: 220 lb (100 kg)

Career information
- High school: Enloe (Raleigh, North Carolina)
- College: NC State (2000–2002); Florida Atlantic (2003–2005)
- NBA draft: 2005: undrafted
- Playing career: 2005–present

Career history
- 2005–2006: Rome Gladiators
- 2005–2006: Tuborg Pilsener S.K.
- 2006–2007: Ciudad de Vigo Básquet
- 2007–2008: Étendard de Brest
- 2009–2010: Harbour Heat
- 2009–2010: Oita Heat Devils
- 2010–2011: Sendai 89ers
- 2011: Toros de Nuevo Laredo
- 2012–2013: Osaka Evessa
- 2013–2014: Valhalla
- 2015: Trepça
- 2015–2016: Shinshu Brave Warriors
- 2017: Hong Kong Typhoon
- 2018: Hanoi Buffaloes
- 2018–2019: Macau Wolf Warriors
- 2018–2019: Hanoi Buffaloes
- 2020: Yamagata Wyverns
- 2020: Akita Northern Happinets
- 2020: Hanoi Buffaloes

Career highlights
- 2x VBA Defensive player of the year (2018, 2019); VBA Playoffs MVP (2018); ASUN Player of the Year (2005)

Michael Bell (born August 11, 1982) is an American professional basketball player for Metropoli Basketball Academy in Cartago, Costa Rica.

Children: MiKaeya Bell (2015)

== High school career ==
Bell played high school basketball at Enloe High School in Raleigh, North Carolina.

== College career ==
After high school, Bell played college basketball for the NC State Wolfpack, and Florida Atlantic University, with the Florida Atlantic Owls from 2000 to 2005. He was Atlantic Sun Player of the Year in 2005.

== College statistics ==
Year	Team	GP	GS	MPG	FG%	3P%	FT%	RPG	APG	SPG	BPG	PPG
2000–01	NC State	4	0		.667	.000	.333	1.25	1.30	0	0	1.80
2001–02	NC State	14	0		.300	.200	.545	1.07	1.30	0.43	0.21	0.90
2003–04	Florida Atlantic	27	27	36.4	.464	.312	.539	10.33	1.30	1.15	1.96	17.96
2004–05	Florida Atlantic	27	26	35.1	.485	.329	.508	9.52	1.11	1.04	1.89	19.11

== Career statistics ==
Legend
GP	Games played	GS	Games started	MPG	Minutes per game
FG%	Field goal percentage	3P%	3-point field goal percentage	FT%	Free throw percentage
RPG	Rebounds per game	APG	Assists per game	SPG	Steals per game
BPG	Blocks per game	PPG	Points per game	**Bold**	Career high

*	Led the league

=== Regular season ===
Year	Team	GP	GS	MPG	FG%	3P%	FT%	RPG	APG	SPG	BPG	PPG
2005–06	Tuborg	8		20.6	.394	.267	.167	5.4	0.8	0.4	1.3	3.6
2007–08	Brest	9		24.3	.365	.138	.748	7.1	1.2	1.1	1.0	10.2
2009–10	Oita	50	50	34.8	.493	.292	.507	12.4	2.2	1.2	1.2	21.3
2010–11	Sendai	36	36	34.0	.515	.374	.452	9.8	2.4	0.8	1.3	18.4
2010–11	Toros	4	3	26.7	.405	.235	.667	6.75	0.75	0.75	0.50	11.0
2011–12	Osaka	30	27	32.2	.453	.290	.470	10.0	2.2	1.2	1.2	14.5
2012–13	Osaka	44	43	32.0	.449	.222	.568	11.6	2.0	1.4	1.2	14.4
2015–16	Shinshu	52	46	32.9	.456	.339	.595	11.9	2.6	1.3	1.7	17.5
2018	Hanoi	20		39.4	.581	.354	.463	17.7*	2.8	1.8	3.1*	20.4
2019	Hanoi	10		37.5	.557	.365	.611	21.5*	2.8	2.0	3.0*	24.6
2019–20	Yamagata	2	2	38.5	.395	.143	.500	18.0	4.5	2.5	0	16.0

=== NBA Summer League ===
Year	Team	GP	GS	MPG	FG%	3P%	FT%	RPG	APG	SPG	BPG	PPG
2007–08	Orlando	2	0	3.0	.500	.000	.000	0	0	0	0	1.0

== Awards ==
- bj League monthly MVP (2010)
- VBA weekly MVP(2018)
- 2x VBA weekly MVP(2019)
