= 2018 VBA season =

Vietnam Basketball Association
- Season: 2018
- Duration: June 16, 2018 – August 16, 2018 (Regular season); August 21, 2018 – August 26, 2018 (Playoffs); September 4, 2018 – September 9, 2018 (Finals)
- Games played: 52
- Teams: 6

Regular season
- Top seed: Cantho Catfish
- Season MVP: (United States) DeAngelo Hamilton; Cantho Catfish

Finals
- Champions: Cantho Catfish
- Runners-up: Hanoi Buffaloes
- Semifinalists: Saigon Heat; Thang Long Warriors
- Finals MVP: (United States) DeAngelo Hamilton; Cantho Catfish
- Playoffs MVP: (United States) Mike Bell; Hanoi Buffaloes

Awards
- Domestic MVP: (Vietnam) Nguyễn Phú Hoàng; Cantho Catfish
- Heritage MVP: (United States) Chris Dierker; Danang Dragons

The 2018 VBA season was the third season of the Vietnam Basketball Association. The regular season began on June 16, 2018, and ended on August 16, 2018. The playoffs began on August 21, 2018, and ended on August 26, 2018. The finals began on September 4, 2018, and ended on September 9, 2018, with Cantho Catfish beating Hanoi Buffaloes in 3 games.

== Teams ==
=== Venues and locations ===
Locations of teams in 2018 VBA

Team	Home city	Arena
Cantho Catfish	Cần Thơ	Da Nang Sports Arena
Danang Dragons	Đà Nẵng	Quan Khu 5 Sports Arena
Hanoi Buffaloes	Hà Nội	Bach Khoa Sports Arena
Hochiminh City Wings	Ho Chi Minh City	Ho Xuan Huong Sports Arena
Saigon Heat	Ho Chi Minh City	CIS Sports Arena
Thang Long Warriors	Hà Nội	Su Pham Sports Arena

=== Personnel and sponsorship ===
Team	Head coach	Captain	Kit manufacturer
Cantho Catfish	(United States) Kevin Yurkus	Lê Hiếu Thành	Thang Be Sport
Danang Dragons	(United States) Donte' Hill	Horace Nguyen	Thang Be Sport
Hanoi Buffaloes	(United States) Todd Purves	Vincent Nguyen	Alien Sports
Hochiminh City Wings	(Vietnam) Hứa Phong Hảo	Nguyễn Huỳnh Hải	Thang Be Sport
Saigon Heat	(United States) David Singleton	Triệu Hán Minh	Hemero
Thang Long Warriors	(Serbia) Predrag Lukic	Justin Young	Thang Be Sport

=== Managerial changes ===
Team	Outgoing manager	Manner of departure	Date of vacancy	Position in table	Replaced with	Date of appointment
Hochiminh City Wings	(Philippines) Ricky Magallanes	Contract ended	4 December 2017	Pre-season	(United States) Brian Rowsom	27 March 2018
Thang Long Warriors	(United States) Lee Tao Dana	Resigned	2 February 2018	Pre-season	(United States) Matt Skillman	27 March 2018
Thang Long Warriors	(United States) Matt Skillman	Sacked	17 June 2018	5th	(Serbia) Predrag Lukic	18 June 2018
Hochiminh City Wings	(United States) Brian Rowsom	Changed to team counselor	20 July 2018	6th	(Vietnam) Hứa Phong Hảo	20 July 2018

=== Import players ===
Each team is allowed 2 heritage players and 1 foreign player.

Team	Heritage 1	Heritage 2	Foreign
Cantho Catfish	(United States) Tam Dinh	(United States) Sang Dinh	(United States) DeAngelo Hamilton
Danang Dragons	(United States) Chris Dierker	(United States) Horace Nguyen	(United States) Zach Allmon
Hanoi Buffaloes	(Sweden) Stefan Nguyen	(Netherlands) Vincent Nguyen	(United States) Mike Bell
Hochiminh City Wings	(United States) Corey Cilia	(United States) Henry Nguyen	(United States) Quinton Doggett
Saigon Heat	(United States) Khoa Tran		(United States) Tavarion Nix
Thang Long Warriors	(United States) Justin Young	(Canada) Ryan Le	(United States) Jaywuan Hill

== Draft ==
Rnd.	Pick	Player	Nationality (Note: Nationality indicates the player's national team or representative nationality. If a player has not competed at the international level, then the nationality indicates the national team which the player is eligible to represent according to FIBA rules.)	Team	School / club team
1	1	Chris Dierker	United States	Danang Dragons	Madonna University
1	2	Corey Cilia	United States	Hochiminh City Wings	UC Santa Cruz
1	3	Stefan Nguyen	Sweden	Hanoi Buffaloes	Danang Dragons
1	4	Nguyễn Tiến Dương	Vietnam	Hanoi Buffaloes	
1	5	Trần Đăng Khoa	United States	Saigon Heat	Danang Dragons
1	6	Nguyễn Văn Hùng	Vietnam	Thang Long Warriors	
2	1	Lê Văn Đầy	Vietnam	Danang Dragons	Cantho Catfish
2	2	Dư Minh An	Vietnam	Hochiminh City Wings	Cantho Catfish
2	3	Huỳnh Khang	Vietnam	Hanoi Buffaloes	Saigon Heat
2	4	Nguyễn Lê Quốc Cường	Vietnam	Cantho Catfish	
2	5	Lê Ngọc Tú	Vietnam	Saigon Heat	
2	6	Đặng Thái Hưng	Vietnam	Thang Long Warriors	Hanoi Buffaloes
3	1	Đàm Huy Đại	Vietnam	Danang Dragons	
3	2	Phạm Thanh Tùng	Vietnam	Hochiminh City Wings	Hanoi Buffaloes
3	3	Huỳnh Thanh Tâm	Vietnam	Hanoi Buffaloes	Cantho Catfish
3	4	Tăng Minh Trí	Vietnam	Cantho Catfish	
3	5	Nguyễn Huỳnh Hải	Vietnam	Saigon Heat	
3	6	Ngô Tuấn Trung	Vietnam	Thang Long Warriors	Hochiminh City Wings

== Regular season ==
=== Standings ===
Pos	Team	Pld	W	L	PF	PA	PD	PCT	GB	Qualification	CTC	TLW	HNB	SGH	DND	HCM
1	Cantho Catfish	15	13	2	1286	1155	+131	.867	—	Advance to Playoffs	—	69–67; 69-80	82–74	86–78	88–78; 90-77	79–71; 88-84
2	Thang Long Warriors	15	10	5	1154	1058	+96	.667	3	Advance to Playoffs	74–77	—	69–75	69–57; 83-84	70–76; 93-79	82–71; 92-69
3	Hanoi Buffaloes	15	9	6	1172	1126	+46	.600	4	Advance to Playoffs	77–92; 69-86	62–63; 67-71 (OT)	—	82–96	86–76	85–67
4	Saigon Heat	15	9	6	1250	1189	+61	.600	4	Advance to Playoffs	89–74; 80-91	62–73	65–72; 71-77	—	102–90	86–77
5	Danang Dragons	15	3	12	1184	1319	−135	.200	10		80–111	69–78	71–82; 84-91	69–83; 78-91	—	79–72
6	Hochiminh City Wings	15	1	14	1147	1342	−195	.067	12		77–104	72–90	62–88; 75-85	89–106; 79-100	75–77; 107-101	—

Updated to match(es) played on 16 August 2018. Source: vba.vn

== Playoffs ==
Semifinals
1 Cantho Catfish	90	94
4 Saigon Heat	70	87
2 Thang Long Warriors	63	74
3 Hanoi Buffaloes	67	75

Finals
1 Cantho Catfish	80	90	76
3 Hanoi Buffaloes	76	68	71

== Statistics ==
=== Team statistics ===
- Points per game: Cantho Catfish (85.80)
- Field goal %: Cantho Catfish, Hanoi Buffaloes, Saigon Heat (44%)
- 3-point field goal %: Hochiminh City Wings (35%)
- Rebounds per game: Thang Long Warriors (40.35)
- Assists per game: Cantho Catfish (17.65)
- Steals per game: Thang Long Warriors (12.41)
- Blocks per game: Cantho Catfish (3.85)
- Turnovers per game: Hanoi Buffaloes (18.25)

== Awards ==
=== Yearly awards ===
- Fans of the year: Cantho Catfish
- Local referee of the year: Triệu Chí Thành
- Young player of the year: Võ Kim Bản (Saigon Heat)
- Sixth man of the year: Đặng Thái Hưng (Thang Long Warriors)
- Sportsmanship award: Henry Nguyen (Hochiminh City Wings)
- Defensive player of the year: Mike Bell (Hanoi Buffaloes)
- Most favorite player of the year: Vincent Nguyen (Hanoi Buffaloes)
- Local player of the year: Nguyễn Phú Hoàng (Cantho Catfish)
- Heritage player of the year: Chris Dierker (Danang Dragons)
- Most valuable player of the year: DeAngelo Hamilton (Cantho Catfish)
- Coach of the year: Kevin Yurkus (Cantho Catfish)

=== MVP of the Week ===
For week ending	Player	Team	Ref.
24 June 2018	Chris Dierker (1/1)	Danang Dragons	1
1 July 2018	Jaywuan Hill (1/1)	Thang Long Warriors	2
8 July 2018	Lê Ngọc Tú (1/1)	Hanoi Buffaloes	3
15 July 2018	DeAngelo Hamilton (1/2)	Cantho Catfish	4
22 July 2018	Mike Bell (1/1)	Hanoi Buffaloes	5
29 July 2018	Khoa Tran (1/2)	Saigon Heat	6
5 August 2018	Justin Young (1/1)	Thang Long Warriors	7
12 August 2018	DeAngelo Hamilton (2/2)	Cantho Catfish	8
19 August 2018	Khoa Tran (2/2)	Saigon Heat	9
