= 2019 VBA season =

Vietnam Basketball Association
- Season: 2019
- Duration: 1 June 2019 – 18 August 2019 (Regular season); 24 August 2019 – 31 August 2019 (Playoffs); 7 September 2019 - 17 September 2019 (Finals)
- Games played: 55
- Teams: 6

Regular season
- Top seed: Cantho Catfish
- Season MVP: (United States) Tam Dinh (Cantho Catfish)

Finals
- Champions: Saigon Heat
- Runners-up: Cantho Catfish
- Semifinalists: Hochiminh City Wings; Thang Long Warriors
- Finals MVP: (United States) Tavarion Nix (Saigon Heat)

Awards
- Domestic MVP: (Vietnam) Dư Minh An (Saigon Heat)
- Heritage MVP: (Netherlands) Vincent Nguyen (Hochiminh City Wings)

The 2019 VBA season was the fourth season of the Vietnam Basketball Association. The regular season began on 1 June 2019 and ended on 18 August 2019. The playoffs began on 24 August 2019 and ended on 31 August 2019. The finals began on 7 September 2019 and ended on 17 September 2019 with the Saigon Heat beating the Cantho Catfish in 5 games.

== Teams ==
=== Venues and locations ===
Locations of teams in 2019 VBA

| Team | Home city | Arena |
|---|---|---|
| Cantho Catfish | Cần Thơ | Da Nang Sports Arena |
| Danang Dragons | Đà Nẵng | Quan Khu 5 Sports Arena |
| Hanoi Buffaloes | Hà Nội | Bach Khoa Sports Arena |
| Hochiminh City Wings | Ho Chi Minh City | Ho Xuan Huong Sports Arena |
| Saigon Heat | Ho Chi Minh City | CIS Sports Arena |
| Thang Long Warriors | Hà Nội | Su Pham Sports Arena |

=== Personnel and sponsorship ===
| Team | Head coach | Captain | Kit manufacturer |
|---|---|---|---|
| Cantho Catfish | (United States) Jordan Collins | Lê Hiếu Thành | Hemero |
| Danang Dragons | (Vietnam) Phan Thanh Cảnh | Horace Nguyen | |
| Hanoi Buffaloes | (United States) Lee Tao Dana | Henry Nguyen | |
| Hochiminh City Wings | (Serbia) Predrag Lukic | Phạm Thanh Tùng | Hemero |
| Saigon Heat | (United States) David Singleton | Tavarion Nix | |
| Thang Long Warriors | (United States) Matt Juranek | Justin Young | |

=== Managerial changes ===
| Team | Outgoing manager | Manner of departure | Date of vacancy | Position in table | Replaced with | Date of appointment |
|---|---|---|---|---|---|---|
| Thang Long Warriors | (Serbia) Predrag Lukic | Resigned | 11 November 2018 | Pre-season | (United States) Matt Juranek | 22 March 2019 |
| Hochiminh City Wings | vacant | | | Pre-season | (Serbia) Predrag Lukic | 24 November 2018 |
| Cantho Catfish | (United States) Kevin Yurkus | Resigned | 7 January 2019 | Pre-season | (United States) Jordan Collins | 18 February 2019 |
| Danang Dragons | (United States) Donte Hill | Fired | 7 January 2019 | Pre-season | (Vietnam) Phan Thanh Cảnh | 23 March 2019 |
| Hanoi Buffaloes | (United States) Todd Purves | Resigned | 7 July 2019 | 5 | (United States) Lee Tao Dana | 10 July 2019 |

== Drafts ==
| Rnd. | Pick | Player | Nationality (Note: Nationality indicates the player's national team or representative nationality. If a player has not competed at the international level, then the nationality indicates the national team which the player is eligible to represent according to FIBA rules.) | Team | School / club team |
|---|---|---|---|---|---|
| 1 | 1 | Michael Soy | Canada | Hochiminh City Wings | |
| 1 | 2 | Nguyễn Văn Hùng | Vietnam | Danang Dragons | Hanoi Buffaloes |
| 1 | 3 | Richard Nguyen | United States | Saigon Heat | |
| 1 | 4 | Đỗ Xuân Nam | Vietnam | Hanoi Buffaloes | Thang Long Warriors |
| 1 | 5 | Nguyễn Thành Đạt | Vietnam | Thang Long Warriors | Hanoi Buffaloes |
| 1 | 6 | Võ Huy Hoàn | Vietnam | Hochiminh City Wings | Saigon Heat |
| 2 | 1 | Lai Xương Thành | Vietnam | Hanoi Buffaloes | Hochiminh City Wings |
| 2 | 2 | Austin Ly | Canada | Danang Dragons | |
| 2 | 3 | Phạm Đức Kiên | Vietnam | Saigon Heat | Hanoi Buffaloes |
| 2 | 4 | Tô Quang Trung | Vietnam | Hanoi Buffaloes | Thang Long Warriors |
| 2 | 5 | Nguyễn Tiến Dương | Vietnam | Thang Long Warriors | Hanoi Buffaloes |
| 2 | 6 | Tăng Minh Trí | Vietnam | Cantho Catfish | Cantho Catfish |
| 3 | 1 | Bùi Quốc Tân | Vietnam | Cantho Catfish | Saigon Heat |
| 3 | 2 | Đàm Huy Đại | Vietnam | Danang Dragons | Danang Dragons |
| 3 | 3 | Huỳnh Vĩnh Quang | Vietnam | Saigon Heat | Saigon Heat |
| 3 | 4 | Bùi Thái Hà | Vietnam | Hanoi Buffaloes | Thang Long Warriors |
| 3 | 5 | Bạch Công Trung | Vietnam | Thang Long Warriors | Hanoi Buffaloes |
| 3 | 6 | Nguyễn Vũ Bình Nguyên | Vietnam | Cantho Catfish | Cantho Catfish |

== Regular season ==
=== Standings ===
| Pos | Team | Pld | W | L | PF | PA | PD | PCT | GB | Qualification | CTC | SGH | HCM | TLW | HNB | DND |
|---|---|---|---|---|---|---|---|---|---|---|---|---|---|---|---|---|
| 1 | Cantho Catfish | 15 | 9 | 6 | 1269 | 1217 | +52 | .600 | — | Advance to Playoffs | — | 84–83; 92-75 | 67–89; 80-74 | 71–86 | 70–64 | 107–92 |
| 2 | Saigon Heat | 15 | 9 | 6 | 1136 | 1062 | +74 | .600 | — | Advance to Playoffs | 77–90 | — | 71–67; 65-79 | 88–54; 69-52 | 87–81 | 78–52; 88-74 |
| 3 | Hochiminh City Wings | 15 | 8 | 7 | 1088 | 1114 | −26 | .533 | 1 | Advance to Playoffs | 80–75 | 84–76 | — | 79–77 (OT); 60-74 | 67–98; 69-85 | 69–75 |
| 4 | Thang Long Warriors | 15 | 7 | 8 | 1060 | 1058 | +2 | .467 | 2 | Advance to Playoffs | 83–81; 76-85 | 56–64 | 62–66 | — | 64–61; 72-78 | 80–51 |
| 5 | Hanoi Buffaloes | 15 | 7 | 8 | 1134 | 1126 | +8 | .467 | 2 | | 73–76; 99-131 | 70–84; 65-61 | 78–63 | 64–71 | — | 71–82; 76-57 |
| 6 | Danang Dragons | 15 | 5 | 10 | 1055 | 1169 | −114 | .333 | 4 | | 87–86; 79-74 | 62–70 | 60–67; 71-75 | 75–70; 66-83 | 72–75 | — |

Updated to match(es) played on 18 August 2019. Source: vba.vn

== Playoffs ==
Semifinals
1 Cantho Catfish | 73 | 87 | 81
4 Thang Long Warriors | 81 | 82 | 79
2 Saigon Heat | 66 | 74
3 Hochiminh City Wings | 45 | 71

Finals
1 Cantho Catfish | 78 | 74 | 74 | 49 | 68
2 Saigon Heat | 75 | 84 | 68 | 66 | 69

== Awards ==
=== Yearly awards ===
- Fans of the year: Cantho Catfish
- Assist of the year: DeAngelo Hamilton (Cantho Catfish)
- Buzzer beater of the year: Lê Hiếu Thành (Cantho Catfish)
- Handle of the year: Nguyễn Phú Hoàng (Cantho Catfish)
- Block of the year: DeAngelo Hamilton (Cantho Catfish)
- Dunk of the year: Tam Dinh (Cantho Catfish)
- Favorite player of the year: Tam Dinh (Cantho Catfish)
- Rookie of the year: Trương Thái Nam (Hochiminh City Wings)
- Most improved player of the year: Sơn Minh Tâm (Danang Dragons)
- Sportsmanship of the year: Nguyễn Văn Hùng (Danang Dragons)
- Sixth man of the year: Hồng Gia Lân (Thang Long Warriors)
- Defensive player of the year: Mike Bell (Hanoi Buffaloes)
- Local referee of the year: Triệu Chí Thành
- Coach of the year: Predrag Lukic (Hochiminh City Wings)
- Local player of the year: Dư Minh An (Saigon Heat)
- Heritage of the year: Vincent Nguyen (Hochiminh City Wings)
- Most valuable player of the year: Tam Dinh (Cantho Catfish)

=== MVP of the Week ===
| For week ending | Player | Team | Ref. |
|---|---|---|---|
| 9 June 2019 | Vincent Nguyen (1/1) | Hochiminh City Wings | 1 |
| 16 June 2019 | Wayne Martin (1/1) | Hochiminh City Wings | 2 |
| 23 June 2019 | Mike Bell (1/2) | Hanoi Buffaloes | 3 |
| 30 June 2019 | Anthony January (1/1) | Danang Dragons | 4 |
| 7 July 2019 | Michael Soy (1/1) | Hochiminh City Wings | 5 |
| 14 July 2019 | Tam Dinh (1/2) | Cantho Catfish | 6 |
| 21 July 2019 | Tam Dinh (2/2) | Cantho Catfish | 7 |
| 28 July 2019 | Mike Bell (2/2) | Hanoi Buffaloes | 8 |
| 4 August 2019 | Jaywuan Hill (1/1) | Thang Long Warriors | 9 |
| 11 August 2019 | Tavarion Nix (1/2) | Saigon Heat | 10 |
| 18 August 2019 | Tavarion Nix (2/2) | Saigon Heat | 11 |
