= 2024 VBA season =

Vietnam Basketball Association season

Vietnam Basketball Association
- Season: 2024
- Duration: 19 June – 11 September (Regular season); 15 – 28 September (Playoffs)
- Games played: 20
- Teams: 6
- TV partner(s): Vietnam: On Sports; Online: Facebook Watch; TikTok; YouTube

Regular season
- Top seed: Saigon Heat

Finals
- Champions: Saigon Heat
- Runners-up: Cantho Catfish
- Finals MVP: Elijah Weaver (Saigon)

Statistical leaders
Points	Chrishon Briggs (HCMC)	26.2
Rebounds	Ruot Monyyong (Hanoi)	14.3
Assists	Devin Peterson (Hanoi)	8.3

The 2024 VBA season (Vietnamese: VBA mùa giải 2024) was the ninth season of the Vietnam Basketball Association. The regular season began on 19 June and ended on 11 September. The playoffs then began on 15 September, and ended on 28 September with the Saigon Heat clinching their 5th straight title after sweeping the Cantho Catfish in the Finals.

The league lost a team after the Thang Long Warriors announced that they would sit out the season due to financial issues. In a move to help other teams dealing with financial woes, the league moved the operations for the Cantho Catfish, Danang Dragons and Nha Trang Dolphins to Ho Xuan Huong Arena in Ho Chi Minh City.

== Teams ==
The league consists of 6 teams, after the Thang Long Warriors announced that they would sit out the season due to financial issues.

=== Locations, venues and personnel ===
Team	Home city	Arena	Head coach
Hanoi Buffaloes	Hanoi	Tay Ho Sports Complex	(United States) Erik Rashad
Cantho Catfish	Ho Chi Minh City	Ho Xuan Huong Arena	(Vietnam) Le Tran Minh Nghia
Danang Dragons	Ho Chi Minh City	Ho Xuan Huong Arena	(United States) Todd Purves
Hochiminh City Wings	Ho Chi Minh City	Ho Xuan Huong Arena	(United States) Lee Tao Dana
Nha Trang Dolphins	Ho Chi Minh City	Ho Xuan Huong Arena	(United States) Chris Daleo
Saigon Heat	Ho Chi Minh City	CIS Arena	(England) David Grice

=== Coaching Transactions ===
Coaching changes
Team	2023 season	2024 season
Off-season
Saigon Heat	(United States) Matt Van Pelt	(England) David Grice
Nha Trang Dolphins	(Serbia) Predrag Lukic	(United States) Chris Daleo
Hochiminh City Wings	(United States) Erik Olson	(United States) Lee Tao Dana
Cantho Catfish	(United States) Jordan Collins	(Vietnam) Le Tran Minh Nghia

== Foreign players ==
Teams are allowed to register two foreign players and one heritage player. Heritage players are designated players who have Vietnamese heritage or have been naturalized. They do not count against the teams allotted foreign player slots.

Team	Player 1	Player 1	Heritage Player	Replaced
Cantho Catfish	(Ukraine) Yevgen Sakhniuk	(United States) Dakota Zinser	(United States) Tam Dinh	(United States) Joshua Keyes
Danang Dragons	(United States) Max Allen	(United States) Marquis Davison	(United States) Bryan Nguyen	
Hanoi Buffaloes	(United States) Ruot Monyyong	(United States) Devin Peterson	(United States) Hassan Thomas	(United States) Eric Frederick
Hochiminh City Wings	(United States) Chrishon Briggs	(United States) Maurice Gordon	(United States) Khoa Tran	
Nha Trang Dolphins	(United States) Mykal Jenkins	(England) Joe Mvuezolo	(United States) Dominique Tham	
Saigon Heat	(Canada) Jevonnie Scott	(United States) Elijah Weaver		

== Regular season ==
The regular season began on 11 June 2024. The regular season came to an end on 11 September 2024 with the Saigon Heat finishing top of the league, claiming their 4th straight Supporters' Cup.

=== Standings ===
Pos	Team	Pld	W	L	PF	PA	PD	Qualification or relegation
1	Saigon Heat	20	15	5	1680	1536	+144	Qualification to playoffs
2	Hanoi Buffaloes	20	13	7	1678	1679	−1	Qualification to playoffs
3	Cantho Catfish	20	11	9	1555	1563	−8	Qualification to playoffs
4	Nha Trang Dolphins	20	11	9	1687	1599	+88	Qualification to playoffs
5	Danang Dragons	20	7	13	1636	1692	−56	
6	Ho Chi Minh City Wings	20	3	17	1672	1839	−167	

Source: VBA

=== Results ===
==== Games 1–30 ====
Home \ Away	CTC	DND	HNB	HCM	NTD	SGH
Cantho Catfish		90–101	74–68	93–74	85–72	62–83
Danang Dragons	83–66		89–98	91–80	68–85	80–88
Hanoi Buffaloes	88–77	60–88		102–79	85–83	72–95
Hochiminh City Wings	81–82	82–85	91–102		99–95	81–85
Nha Trang Dolphins	73–91	90–86	113–81	97–74		60–89
Saigon Heat	72–62	88–84	87–84	89–82	84–75	

Source: Results
Legend: Blue = home team win; Red = away team win.
Matches with lighter background shading were decided after overtime.

==== Games 31–60 ====
Home \ Away	CTC	DND	HNB	HCM	NTD	SGH
Cantho Catfish		84–76	82–89	87–78	72–58	68–78
Danang Dragons	70–84		69–78	96–93	69–95	74–69
Hanoi Buffaloes	60–82	91–82		96–83	72–100	82–74
Hochiminh City Wings	80–81	97–88	91–111		73–84	107–108
Nha Trang Dolphins	82–64	94–79	80–81	92–68		94–91
Saigon Heat	97–69	80–78	60–78	75–79	88–65	

Source: Results
Legend: Blue = home team win; Red = away team win.
Matches with lighter background shading were decided after overtime.

== Playoffs ==
The playoffs began on 15 September.

=== Bracket ===
Semifinals
1 Saigon Heat	2
4 Nha Trang Dolphins	0
2 Hanoi Buffaloes	0
3 Cantho Catfish	2

Finals
1 Saigon Heat	3
3 Cantho Catfish	0

==== Semifinals ====
Team 1	Series	Team 2	Game 1	Game 2	Game 3
(1) Saigon Heat	2–0	(4) Nha Trang Dolphins	84–82	86–81	–
(2) Hanoi Buffaloes	0–2	(3) Cantho Catfish	59–75	74–81	–

==== Finals ====
Team 1	Series	Team 2	Game 1	Game 2	Game 3	Game 4	Game 5
(1) Saigon Heat	3–0	(3) Cantho Catfish	98–89	97–86	95–83	–	–

== Statistics ==
=== Individual statistic leaders ===
Category	Player	Team	Statistic
Points per game	Chrishon Briggs	Hochiminh City Wings	26.2
Assists per game	Devin Peterson	Hanoi Buffaloes	8.3
Rebounds per game	Ruot Monyyong	Hanoi Buffaloes	14.3
Steals per game	Bryan Nguyen	Danang Dragons	3.1
Blocks per game	Ruot Monyyong	Hanoi Buffaloes	2.3
Field goal percentage	Mykal Jenkins	Nha Trang Dolphins	61.4%
Three point FG percentage	Max Allen	Danang Dragons	35.2%

== Awards ==
=== Yearly awards ===
2024 VBA Awards
Award	Recipient	Team
Most Valuable Player	Yevgen Sakhniuk	Cantho Catfish
Most Valuable Local Player	Nguyễn Huỳnh Phú Vinh	Saigon Heat
Most Valuable Heritage Player	Hassan Thomas	Hanoi Buffaloes
Most Popular Player of the Year	Đặng Thái Hưng	Cantho Catfish
Defensive Player of the Year	Yevgen Sakhniuk	Cantho Catfish
Rookie of the Year	Tim De Kok	Ho Chi Minh City Wings
Sixth Man of the Year	Đặng Thái Hưng	Cantho Catfish
Most Improved Player	Huỳnh Trực Nhân	Danang Dragons
Coach of the Year	Lê Trần Minh Nghĩa	Cantho Catfish

== Notable occurrences ==
- On 20 August 2024, Tam Dinh became the first player to register 2,500 career points in league history.
