= Anthony January =

American basketball player

Anthony Denell January Jr.
Free agent
- Position: Forward

Personal information
- Born: June 16, 1993 Los Angeles, California, U.S.
- Listed height: 205 cm (6 ft 9 in)
- Listed weight: 220 lb (100 kg)

Career information
- High school: Compton (Compton, California); William Howard Taft (Woodland Hills, California)
- College: Cerritos College (2013–2014); New Mexico State (2014–2015); Cal State San Bernardino (2015–2016)
- NBA draft: 2016: undrafted
- Playing career: 2016–present

Career history
- 2017: PEA
- 2018: Cactus Tbilisi
- 2019: Ereliai
- 2019: Danang Dragons
- 2019–2020: Ferro Carril Oeste
- 2020: Ostioneros de Guaymas
- 2021: Team Cali
- 2022: Chernomorets Burgas
- 2022: Club los Pepines
- 2022: Tijuana Zonkeys
- 2023: Hanoi Buffaloes
- 2024: Amartha Hangtuah
- 2024: Paisas Basketball
- 2025: V Islanders

Anthony Denell January Jr. (born June 16, 1993) is an American professional basketball player who last played for the V Islanders of the Vietnam Basketball Association (VBA). He last played college basketball for the Cal State San Bernardino Coyotes.

== Early life ==
January was born in Los Angeles to Anthony January Sr. and Pamela Green.

== High school and college career ==
January played his first three years of high school basketball at Compton High School. He played his final season at William Howard Taft High School, during which he earned West Valley League MVP, and CIF Los Angeles City Section Player of the year award averaging 22 points and 13 rebounds after gaining eligibility following his transfer from Compton.

== Professional career ==
January has played for PEA of the Thailand Basketball League, Cactus Tbilisi of the Georgian Superliga, and BC Mažeikiai of the National Basketball League of Lithuania. In 2019 January signed with the Danang Dragons. In 2021, he played for Team Cali of the Colombian league, averaging 16.5 points, 8.5 rebounds, and 1.0 assist per game. On October 4, 2021, he signed with Khaneh Basketball Khuzestan of the Iranian Basketball Super League.

On 27 November 2023, January joined Pacific Caesar of the Indonesian Basketball League (IBL).
