= John Fields (basketball) =

American basketball player (born 1988)

Nha Trang Dolphins
- Position: Center
- League: VBA

Personal information
- Born: March 30, 1988 (age 37) Woodbridge, Virginia, U.S
- Listed height: 6 ft 8 in (2.03 m)
- Listed weight: 245 lb (111 kg)

Career information
- High school: Jack Britt (Fayetteville, North Carolina)
- College: East Carolina (2006–2008); UNC Wilmington (2009–2010); Tennessee (2010–2011)
- NBA draft: 2012: undrafted
- Playing career: 2011–present

Career history
- 2011–2012: Vilpas Vikings
- 2012: Giessen 46ers
- 2012–2013: Levharti Chomutov
- 2013–2014: Lille Métropole
- 2014–2015: Liège
- 2015–2016: Mons-Hainaut
- 2016–2017: Liège
- 2017: Maccabi Hod HaSharon
- 2017–2018: APOEL
- 2018: Trikala Aries
- 2018: Columbian Dyip
- 2018: Indios de San Francisco de Macorís
- 2018–2019: Singapore Slingers
- 2019: Magnolia Hotshots
- 2019: Hi-Tech
- 2019–2020: Oliveirense
- 2020–2021: Sporting CP
- 2021–2023: Tokyo Hachioji Bee Trains
- 2023: Taiwan Beer
- 2023: Yulon Luxgen Dinos
- 2023: Thang Long Warriors
- 2023: Colegio Los Leones de Quilpué
- 2024: Taiwan Beer
- 2024: RANS Simba Bogor
- 2024: Hi-Tech
- 2024: Lobos Plateados de la BUAP
- 2024–2025: Changhua Pauian BLL
- 2025–present: Nha Trang Dolphins

Career highlights
- Portuguese League champion (2021); Portuguese Cup champion (2021); Portuguese League Cup champion (2019); Portuguese Super Cup champion (2018)

Johnathan Bailey Fields (born March 30, 1988) is an American professional basketball player for the Nha Trang Dolphins of the Vietnam Basketball Association (VBA). He played college basketball for the Tennessee Volunteers.

== Honours ==
Oliveirense

- Portuguese League Cup: 2020
