= Tam Dinh =

Vietnamese-American basketball player

No. 23 – Hanoi Buffaloes
- Position: Shooting guard / small forward
- League: VBA

Personal information
- Born: April 10, 1990 (age 36) Boston, Massachusetts
- Listed height: 6 ft 4 in (1.93 m)
- Listed weight: 181 lb (82 kg)

Career information
- High school: Cypress Creek (Houston, Texas)
- NBA draft: 2008: undrafted
- Playing career: 2016–present

Career history
- 2016–2020: Cantho Catfish
- 2021: Team Vietnam
- 2022–2023: Hanoi Buffaloes
- 2024: Cantho Catfish
- 2025–present: Hanoi Buffaloes

Career highlights
- VBA Season MVP (2019); VBA champion (2018); VBA Heritage MVP (2017); All-VBA First Team (2016)
Medals
Men's basketball
Representing Vietnam
Southeast Asian Games
| Bronze medal – third place | 2019 Philippines | Team |
Men's 3x3 basketball
Representing Vietnam
Southeast Asian Games
| Bronze medal – third place | 2019 Philippines | Team |
| Silver medal – second place | 2021 Vietnam | Team |

Tam Dinh (Vietnamese: Đinh Thanh Tâm; born April 10, 1990) is a Vietnamese-American professional basketball player for the Hanoi Buffaloes of the VBA.

== Pro career ==
=== Cantho Catfish (2016–2019) ===
In 2016, Dinh joined the Cantho Catfish of the VBA prior to the league's inaugural season. At the conclusion of the season, he was named to the All-VBA First Team, finishing with averages of 19.5 points, 5.8 rebounds, and 2.9 assists per game.

=== Saigon Heat (2019–present) ===
In 2019, Dinh signed a contract for the Saigon Heat of the ASEAN Basketball League.

== International career ==
In 2017, Dinh received a Vietnamese passport. He made his debut for the Vietnam national team at the 2017 SEA Games in Kuala Lumpur.

== Career statistics ==
Legend
| GP | Games played | GS | Games started | MPG | Minutes per game |
| FG% | Field goal percentage | 3P% | 3-point field goal percentage | FT% | Free throw percentage |
| RPG | Rebounds per game | APG | Assists per game | SPG | Steals per game |
| BPG | Blocks per game | PPG | Points per game | **Bold** | Career high |

=== VBA ===
==== Regular season ====
| Year | Team | GP | GS | MPG | FG% | 3P% | FT% | RPG | APG | SPG | BPG | PPG |
|---|---|---|---|---|---|---|---|---|---|---|---|---|
| 2016 | Cantho | 16 | 14 | 37.2 | .498 | .338 | .671 | 6.1 | 2.8 | 1.8 | **.3** | 19.6 |
| 2017 | Cantho | 13 | 13 | 35.9 | .462 | .313 | .643 | 6.3 | 2.8 | 1.6 | **.3** | 19.8 |
| 2018 | Cantho | 15 | 15 | 33.9 | .449 | .362 | .737 | **8.4** | 2.9 | 2.3 | .1 | 16.1 |
| 2019 | Cantho | 15 | 14 | **38.9** | **.548** | **.366** | .795 | 7.8 | 2.7 | 1.8 | **.3** | 24.5 |
| 2020 | Cantho | 12 | 12 | **38.9** | .454 | .360 | .771 | 6.5 | **3.4** | 1.8 | .1 | **24.7** |
| 2021 | Vietnam | 3 | 3 | 31.7 | .412 | .294 | **1.000** | 6.3 | 2.0 | 1.3 | .0 | 12.7 |
| 2022 | Hanoi | 12 | 12 | 37.3 | .401 | .289 | .759 | 6.6 | 3.1 | 1.3 | .1 | 16.0 |
| 2023 | Hanoi | 18 | 18 | 34.1 | .451 | .333 | .776 | 5.6 | 2.5 | **2.8** | .1 | 10.6 |
| 2024 | Cantho | **19** | **19** | 35.1 | .399 | .328 | .848 | 6.4 | 1.5 | 1.3 | .2 | 11.8 |
| Career | | 123 | 120 | 36.2 | .463 | .336 | .745 | 6.7 | 2.6 | 1.8 | .2 | 17.3 |

==== Playoffs ====
| Year | Team | GP | GS | MPG | FG% | 3P% | FT% | RPG | APG | SPG | BPG | PPG |
|---|---|---|---|---|---|---|---|---|---|---|---|---|
| 2016 | Cantho | 1 | 1 | 40.0 | **.545** | **.500** | .667 | 7.0 | **5.0** | 2.0 | **2.0** | 17.0 |
| 2017 | Cantho | 7 | 7 | **40.5** | .342 | .246 | .600 | 6.9 | 2.4 | 2.0 | .4 | 15.4 |
| 2018 | Cantho | 5 | 5 | 39.4 | .500 | .333 | .941 | 6.2 | 2.8 | 1.0 | .2 | 22.6 |
| 2019 | Cantho | **8** | **8** | 34.9 | .379 | .434 | .750 | 4.5 | 2.5 | 1.8 | .0 | 12.6 |
| 2020 | Cantho | 2 | 2 | 40.0 | .378 | .200 | **1.000** | **8.0** | 1.5 | .5 | .0 | **25.5** |
| 2022 | Hanoi | 5 | 5 | 39.1 | .424 | .333 | .615 | 4.0 | 2.4 | 1.4 | .0 | 14.4 |
| 2023 | Hanoi | 2 | 2 | 35.3 | .333 | .444 | .000 | 4.5 | 1.0 | 1.0 | .0 | 9.0 |
| 2024 | Cantho | 5 | 5 | 39.5 | .368 | .333 | .900 | 5.2 | 2.6 | **3.0** | .2 | 13.0 |
| Career | | 35 | 35 | 38.4 | .398 | .330 | .779 | 5.5 | 2.5 | 1.7 | .2 | 15.6 |

== Awards and honors ==
=== VBA ===
- VBA champion: 2018
- All-VBA First Team: 2016
- VBA Heritage MVP: 2017
- Most Favorite Player of The Year: 2017
- VBA Season MVP: 2019
