= Vincent Nguyen (basketball) =

Vietnamese-Dutch basketball player

No. 9 – Attacus Veghel
- Position: Point guard
- League: Promotiedivisie

Personal information
- Born: February 24, 1995 (age 31) Schijndel, Netherlands
- Listed height: 5 ft 11 in (1.80 m)
- Listed weight: 154 lb (70 kg)

Career information
- College: Tilburg University

Career history
- 2014–2016: Den Bosch
- 2017–2018: Hanoi Buffaloes
- 2019–2024: Hochiminh City Wings
- 2019–2020: Saigon Heat (ABL)
- 2024–present: Attacus Veghel

Career highlights
- VBA Heritage MVP (2019); VBA assists leader (2017)

Vincent Nguyen (Vietnamese: Nguyễn Quang Vinh; born 24 February 1995) is a Vietnamese-Dutch professional basketball player for Attacus Veghel of the Promotiedivisie.

== Career ==
Nguyen was born in the Netherlands to a Vietnamese father and a Dutch mother. He began his youth career in 2007. He played for Den Bosch for two years.

=== Hanoi Buffaloes (2017-present) ===
Nguyen was selected by the Hanoi Buffaloes with the second overall pick in the 2017 VBA draft.

== Career statistics ==
Legend
GP	Games played	GS	Games started	MPG	Minutes per game
FG%	Field goal percentage	3P%	3-point field goal percentage	FT%	Free throw percentage
RPG	Rebounds per game	APG	Assists per game	SPG	Steals per game
BPG	Blocks per game	PPG	Points per game	**Bold**	Career high

=== VBA ===
Year	Team	GP	GS	MPG	FG%	3P%	FT%	RPG	APG	SPG	BPG	PPG
2017	Hanoi Buffaloes	17	17	**36**	.380	.260	**.880**	5.4	**5.6**	2.2	**.2**	13.7
2018	Hanoi Buffaloes	**20**	**20**	29	.390	.280	.740	5.1	3	1.4	.1	10.4
2019	Hochiminh City Wings	15	14	34	.410	.250	.700	**7.1**	4.1	**3.1**	.0	15.1
2020	Hochiminh City Wings	12	12	34	**.440**	**.350**	.810	6.0	4.1	2.5	.0	**15.4**
Career		64	63	33	.410	.290	.780	5.9	4.2	2.3	.1	13.7

== Awards and honors ==
=== VBA ===
- VBA assists leader: 2017
- VBA Heritage MVP: 2019
