= C. J. Jackson =

American basketball player

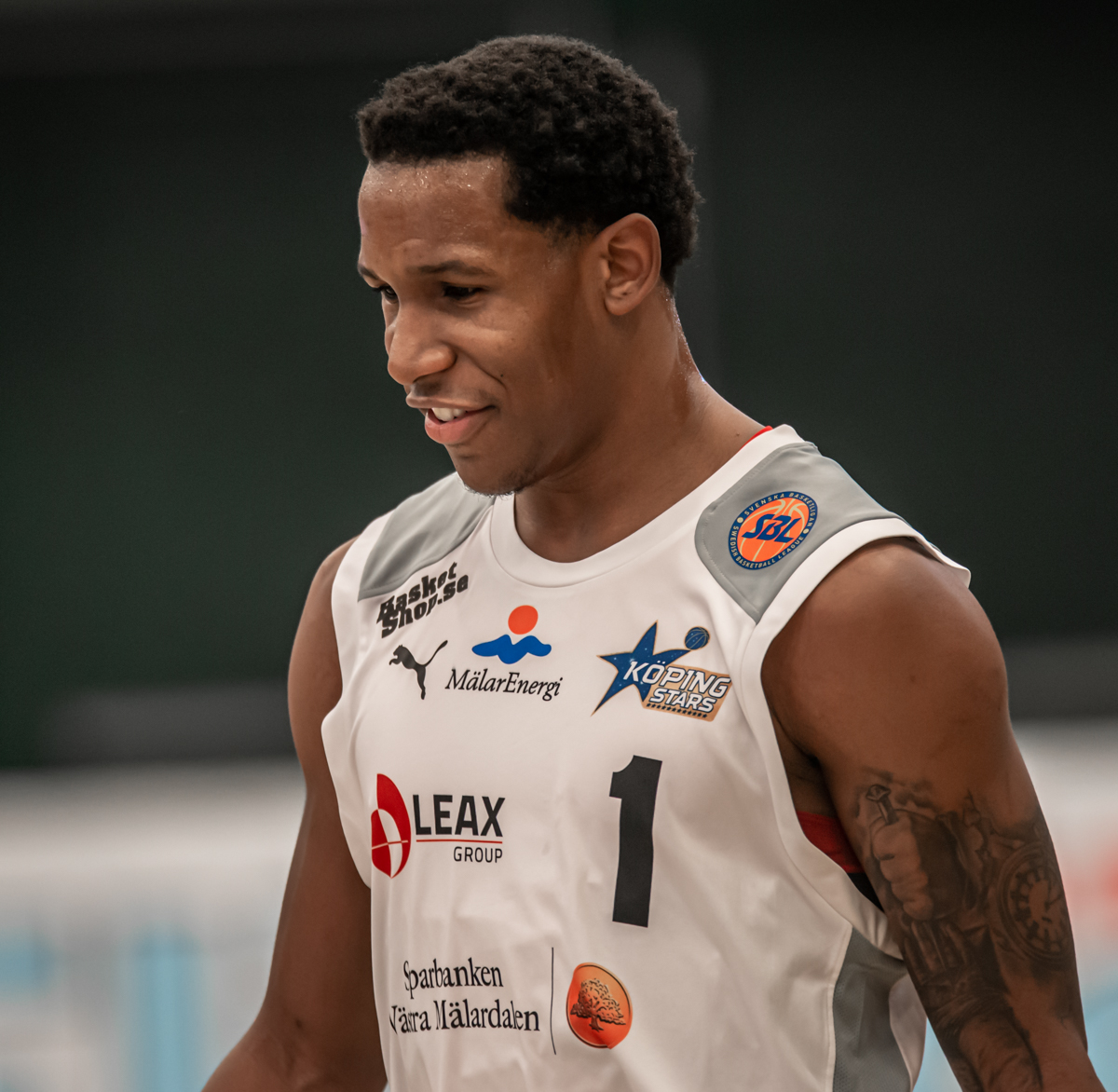
- Jackson with the Köping Stars in 2021

Jämtland Basket
- Position: Point guard
- League: Swedish Basketball League

Personal information
- Born: May 9, 1996 (age 30)
- Listed height: 6 ft 1 in (1.85 m)
- Listed weight: 175 lb (79 kg)

Career information
- High school: Olympic (Charlotte, North Carolina); Montverde Academy (Montverde, Florida)
- College: Eastern Florida State (2015–2016); Ohio State (2016–2019)
- NBA draft: 2019: undrafted
- Playing career: 2019–present

Career history
- 2019–2021: Köping Stars
- 2021: Hapoel Migdal/Jezreel
- 2022–2022: Bisons Loimaa
- 2022–2022: Nha Trang Dolphins
- 2022–2022: Leicester Riders
- 2022–present: Jämtland Basket

Career highlights
- Second-team NJCAA Division I All-American (2016)

Cleveland Alan Jackson Jr., better known as C.J. Jackson (born May 9, 1996), is an American professional basketball player for Jämtland Basket of the Swedish Basketball League. He played college basketball for Ohio State University.

== Early life ==
Jackson was born in Georgia, the son of Cleveland and Shawn Jackson. He is the oldest of three children. CJ has two younger sisters, Camiya and Camryn. He moved to Los Angeles at a young age so his father could coach at a high school, then back to Georgia where the elder Jackson became an assistant at Mercer.

After a high school career at Olympic High School in Charlotte, North Carolina, where he helped his team win a NCHSAA 4A state championship, Jackson did a postgraduate year at Montverde Academy in Montverde, Florida. He committed to George Mason, but after coach Paul Hewitt was fired, Jackson committed to Eastern Florida State College.

== College career ==
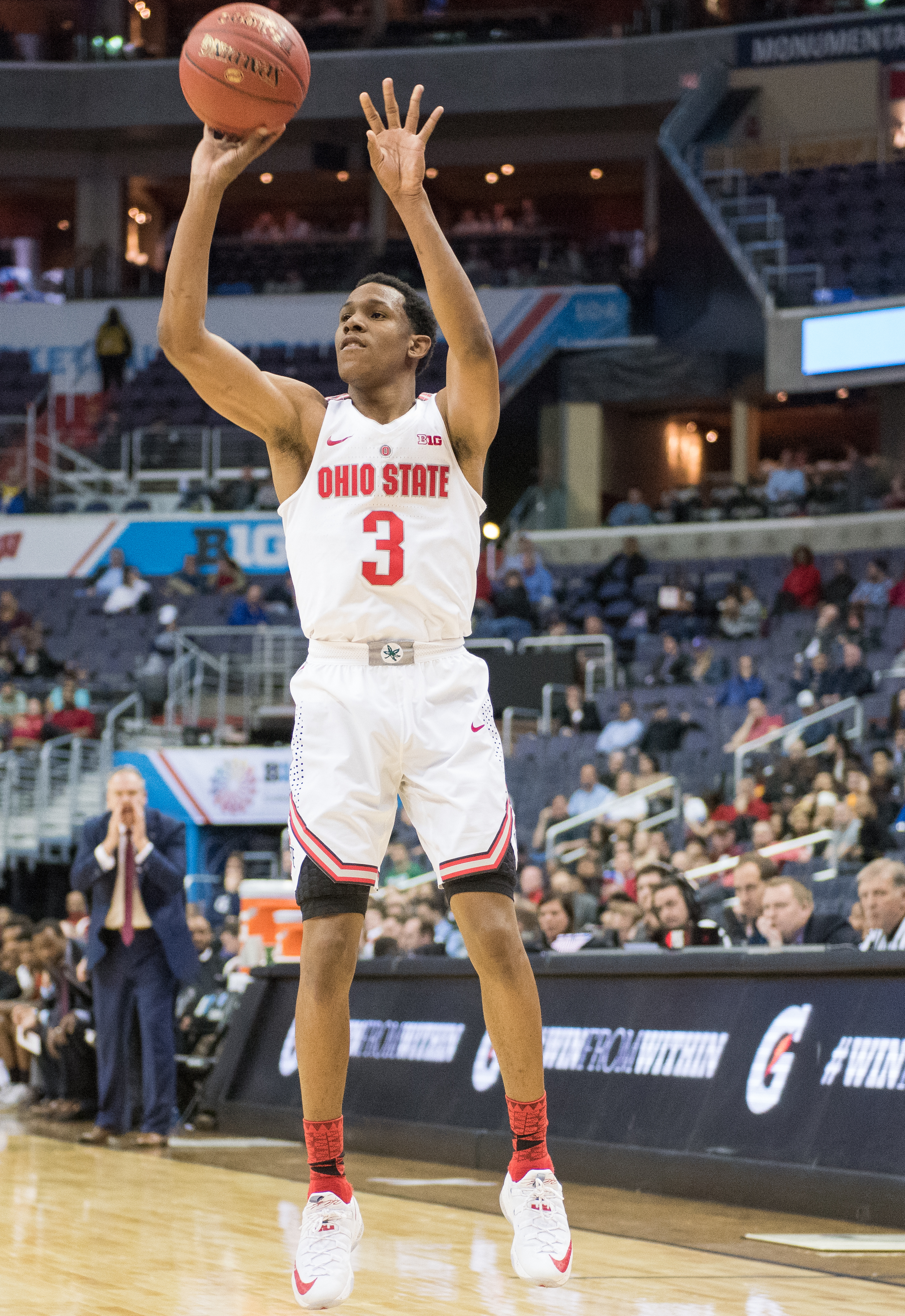
Jackson with Ohio State in 2017

In his lone season at Eastern Florida State College, Jackson averaged 16.9 points, 4.9 rebounds and 4.4 assists per game for the team. He was named to the NJCAA Division I Men's Basketball All-America Second Team. Jackson transferred to Ohio State University, choosing the Buckeyes over offers from UConn, Virginia Tech, and Missouri.

In his first season for the Buckeyes, where he was coached by Thad Matta, Jackson was the back-up point guard and averaged 5.5 points, 2.4 rebounds and 2.8 assists. The following season, the new head coach Chris Holtmann gave Jackson the starting position at the backcourt and Jackson improved his stats and averaged 12.5 points, 3.8 rebounds and 3.8 assists per game for the Buckeyes. He missed a game against Maryland on February 23, 2019 with a shoulder injury. In his last season for the team, Jackson averaged 12.0 points, 3.9 rebounds and 3.5 assists per game.

== Professional career ==
Following the close of his college career, Jackson competed with Team Big X in The Basketball Tournament.

In August 2019, Jackson signed with the Köping Stars of the Swedish Basketligan.

In his first game as a professional, on September 27, 2019, Jackson made the game-winning points when Köping defeated last year's silver medalist Borås Basket in the 2019–20 Basketligan premiere game. With 0.8 seconds left and down by two points, Jackson scored a layup to tie the game, was fouled in the act of shooting and got a bonus throw that he hit to make the game-ending score 91–90.

On November 18, 2019 Jackson got named to the SBL Team of the Week for the first time.

On January 27, 2020 the day after Kobe Bryant's death, Jackson played one of his best games in the Köping Stars shirt with 29 points in a 87–96 over time loss away against Jämtland Basket. Before the game, Jackson changed his jersey number from #1 to #8 to pay respect for the late Lakers legend.

In an interview with Sveriges Radio, a Swedish Radio station, Jackson told that he's been a Lakers fan forever, and that he till this day sleeps with a Lakers pillow. And once time he got courtside Lakers tickets to a game where Kobe Bryant scored over 40 points.

In March 2020 the Coronavirus-pandemic hit Sweden and the season got cancelled. With Köping Stars being on a third place, they received a bronze medal.

In October 2020, Jackson resigned with Köping for a second season with the Stars. In the press release, Jackson says "I’am deeply excited to be back in Köping and i am happy to be around the guys on the team again. The way last season ended i look at this year as unfinished business and i’m ready to make a push at a championship.".

In September 2021, Jackson started the season with Hapoel Migdal/Jezreel in the Liga Leumit. He left in November, after averaging 4 points and 2 rebounds per game. On March 16, 2022, Jackson signed with Bisons Loimaa of the Korisliiga.

== The Basketball Tournament ==
Jackson joined Big X, a team composed primarily of former Big Ten players in The Basketball Tournament 2020. He made the game-winning shot in a 79–74 win over alternate D2 in the first round.
