= AJ Bramah =

American basketball player (born 1999)

No. 2 – Hanoi Buffaloes
- Position: Power forward
- League: VBA

Personal information
- Born: 11 May 1999 (age 27) Oakland, California, U.S.
- Listed height: 6 ft 7 in (2.01 m)
- Listed weight: 205 lb (93 kg)

Career information
- High school: San Leandro (San Leandro, California)
- College: Sheridan College (2017–2019); Robert Morris (2019–2021); Nevada (2021–2022)
- Playing career: 2022–present

Career history
- 2022: Titanes del Distrito
- 2022–2024: Shinagawa City
- 2024: Gifu Swoops
- 2024–2025: Fribourg Olympic
- 2025–2026: Pacific Caesar
- 2026–present: Hanoi Buffaloes

Career highlights
- IBL scoring champion (2026); IBL All-Star MVP (2026); IBL Slam-dunk Contest champion (2025); 2× IBL All-Star (2025, 2026); Second-team All-NEC (2020)

Adonnecy Joshua "AJ" Bramah (born May 11, 1999) is an American professional basketball player for the Hanoi Buffaloes of the Vietnam Basketball Association (VBA). He previously played college basketball for the Sheridan Bruins, Robert Morris Colonials, and the Nevada Wolf Pack.

== College career ==
=== Sheridan College ===
As a freshman for Sheridan College, Bramah averaged 14 PPG, and 10.1 RPG. His career high was on a win against Williston State College, dropping 26 points in a 95–77 win.

=== Robert Morris ===
For the Generals, Bramah led them in the Northern Conference tournament, averaging 17.3 PPG, and 7 RPG. In his first season, Bramah received All-Team NEC honours.

== Professional career ==
On April 21, 2022, Bramah was drafted 1st overall pick in the 2022 LNB Draft by the Indios de San Francisco de Macorís.

On February 1, 2025, Pacific Caesar of the Indonesian Basketball League signed Bramah, replacing former forward, Alioune Tew. In his debut match against Satria Muda Pertamina on February 7, 2025, Bramah dropped 31 points and 12 rebounds.
