= Cantho Catfish =

- Leagues: VBA
- Founded: 2016
- Arena: Can Tho Arena
- Capacity: 4,000
- Location: Cần Thơ, Vietnam
- Team colours: Green, Yellow, Black
- Head coach: (United States) Jordan Collins
- Championships: 1 (2018)
- Website: www.vba.vn/catfish
Home	Away

The Cantho Catfish are a Vietnamese professional basketball team based in Cần Thơ, Vietnam. They play in the Vietnam Basketball Association.

== Season-by-season record ==
Season	Coach	Regular season				Postseason			
Season	Coach	Won	Lost	Win %	Finish	Won	Lost	Win %	Result
2016	David Singleton	5	11	.313	4th	0	1	.000	Wildcards
2017	Kevin Yurkus	9	6	.600	3rd	4	3	.571	Finals
2018	Kevin Yurkus	13	2	.867	1st	5	0	.1000	League Champions
2019	Jordan Collins	9	6	.600	1st	4	4	.500	Finals
2020	Jordan Collins	6	6	.500	4th	0	2	.000	Semifinals
2021	Martin Knežević	2	7	.222	7th	0	1	.000	Quarterfinals; Season cut short due to COVID-19
2022	Leonardo Pérez Armenteros	4	8	.333	6th	Did not qualify			
2023	Jordan Collins	6	12	.333	5th	Did not qualify			
2024	Lê Trần Minh Nghĩa	11	9	.550	3rd	2	3	.400	Finals
2025	Phan Thanh Canh	11	7	.611	3rd	1	2	.333	Semifinals
2026	Phan Thanh Canh	7	13	.350	5th	Did not qualify			
Totals		83	87	.488		16	16	.500	1 League Championship

== Roster ==
Note: Flags indicate national team eligibility at FIBA-sanctioned events. Players may hold other non-FIBA nationalities not displayed.

Cantho Catfish roster
Players
Coaches

Pos.	No.	Nat.	Name	Ht.	Wt.	DOB (YYYY-MM-DD)
G	22	(United States)	Brachon Griffin (IP)	1.85 m (6 ft 1 in)	173 kg (381 lb)	34 – 19 August 1992
F	17	(United States)	DeAngelo Hamilton (IP)	2.03 m (6 ft 8 in)	114 kg (251 lb)	36 – 17 February 1990
G	1	(Cuba)	Luís Bueno Castillo (IP)	1.80 m (5 ft 11 in)	70 kg (154 lb)	27 – 19 June 1999
G	3	(Canada)	Michael Soy (HP)	1.82 m (6 ft 0 in)	78 kg (172 lb)	29 – 15 April 1997
G	1	(Vietnam)	Huỳnh Thanh Tâm	1.70 m (5 ft 7 in)	77 kg (170 lb)	27 – 11 August 1999
G	5	(Vietnam)	Tô Quang Trung	1.80 m (5 ft 11 in)	80 kg (176 lb)	42 – 8 June 1984
SG	6	(Vietnam)	Đàm Huy Đại	1.80 m (5 ft 11 in)	79 kg (174 lb)	43 – 10 March 1983
G	7	(Vietnam)	Võ Lâm Hoàng Duy Hân	1.80 m (5 ft 11 in)	85 kg (187 lb)	26 – 17 October 1999
F	11	(Vietnam)	Lê Khắc Đăng Khoa	1.87 m (6 ft 2 in)	70 kg (154 lb)	24 – 24 March 2002
PG	79	(Vietnam)	Phạm Hiền Tài	1.86 m (6 ft 1 in)	76 kg (168 lb)	25 – 19 October 2000
SG	39	(Vietnam)	Bùi Quốc Tân	1.83 m (6 ft 0 in)	86 kg (190 lb)	34 – 8 April 1992
C	35	(Vietnam)	Đậu Trung Kiên	1.93 m (6 ft 4 in)	82 kg (181 lb)	26 – 30 July 2000
G	3	(Vietnam)	Cô Trần Cơ Nguyên	1.86 m (6 ft 1 in)	77 kg (170 lb)	28 – 14 July 1998
PG	33	(Vietnam)	Trần Vĩ Nghiệp	1.72 m (5 ft 8 in)	65 kg (143 lb)	31 – 27 February 1995
SG	15	(Vietnam)	Nguyễn Văn Vinh	1.85 m (6 ft 1 in)	84 kg (185 lb)	26 – 9 April 2000

Head coach

- (United States) Jordan Collins

Assistant coach(es)

Legend

- (C) Team captain
- (HP) Heritage player
- Injured

- Roster
Updated: 1 May 2019
