= Ho Chi Minh City Wings =

- Leagues: VBA
- Founded: 2016
- Arena: Ho Xuan Huong Sports Arena
- Capacity: 2,000
- Location: Ho Chi Minh City, Vietnam
- Team colours: Royal blue, Yellow
- President: Trần Anh Tú
- Head coach: (United States) Erik Olsen
- Website: www.vba.vn/wings
Home	Away

The Ho Chi Minh City Wings are a Vietnamese professional basketball team based in Ho Chi Minh City, Vietnam. They play in the Vietnam Basketball Association.

== History ==
During the offseason after their inaugural seam, the Wings announced that Finnish head coach Mika Turunen would not return for their sophomore season and named former Vietnam national basketball team head coach Rick Magallanes as his replacement.

== Season-by-season record ==
Season	Coach	Regular Season				Post Season			
Season	Coach	Won	Lost	Win %	Finish	Won	Lost	Win %	Result
2016	Mika Turunen	11	5	.688	2nd	2	3	.400	Finals
2017	Ricky Magallanes	5	10	.333	5th	Did not qualify			
2018	Hứa Phong Hảo	1	14	.067	6th	Did not qualify			
2019	Predrag Lukic	8	7	.533	3rd	0	2	.000	Semi-finals
2020	Gediminas Meiliunas	3	9	.250	7th	Did not qualify			
2021	Erik Olsen	4	3	.571	4th	1	1	.500	Quarterfinals; Season cut short due to COVID-19
2022	Erik Olsen	6	6	.500	4th	0	2	.000	Semi-finals
2023	Erik Olsen	6	12	.333	6th	Did not qualify			
2024	Lee Tao Dana	3	17	.150	6th	Did not qualify			
2025	Le Tran Minh Nghia	2	16	.111	6th	Did not qualify			
2026	Le Tran Minh Nghia	10	10	.500	4th	0	2	.000	Semifinals
Totals		59	109	.351		3	10	.231	

== Current roster ==
Note: Flags indicate national team eligibility at FIBA-sanctioned events. Players may hold other non-FIBA nationalities not displayed.

Ho Chi Minh City Wings roster
Players
Coaches

Pos.	No.	Nat.	Name	Ht.	Wt.
G	0	(United States)	Devon Thomas (IP)	1.83 m (6 ft 0 in)	77 kg (170 lb)	31 – 20 September 1994
F	13	(United States)	De'Sean Parsons (IP)	2.01 m (6 ft 7 in)	98 kg (216 lb)	31 – 3 February 1995
G	3	(Netherlands)	Vincent Nguyen (HP)	1.80 m (5 ft 11 in)	77 kg (170 lb)	30 – 29 September 1995
F	1	(Vietnam)	Chí Anh Mladenovik	1.89 m (6 ft 2 in)	84 kg (185 lb)	25 – 29 January 2001
G	4	(Vietnam)	Huỳnh Thanh Tâm	1.70 m (5 ft 7 in)	77 kg (170 lb)	27 – 11 August 1999
G	6	(Vietnam)	Nguyễn Thanh Tùng	1.83 m (6 ft 0 in)	75 kg (165 lb)	26 – 26 July 2000
G	7	(Vietnam)	Nguyễn Huỳnh Hải	1.75 m (5 ft 9 in)	74 kg (163 lb)	39 – 20 June 1987
F	14	(Vietnam)	Lê Ngọc Tú	1.83 m (6 ft 0 in)	83 kg (183 lb)	35 – 9 October 1990
G	15	(Vietnam)	Lê Trần Đăng Huỳnh	1.80 m (5 ft 11 in)	75 kg (165 lb)	29 – 6 March 1997
F	20	(Vietnam)	Tân Hải Đăng	1.84 m (6 ft 0 in)	75 kg (165 lb)	26 – 29 May 2000
F	21	(Vietnam)	Bùi Anh Khoa	1.86 m (6 ft 1 in)	84 kg (185 lb)	24 – 28 February 2002
F	23	(Vietnam)	Vũ Đoàn Minh Phương	1.87 m (6 ft 2 in)	90 kg (198 lb)	27 – 17 November 1998
F	33	(Vietnam)	Cao Đắc Luận	1.88 m (6 ft 2 in)	85 kg (187 lb)	27 – 4 October 1998
F	39	(Vietnam)	Nguyễn Tuấn Vinh	1.85 m (6 ft 1 in)	85 kg (187 lb)	28 – 16 October 1997
F	91	(Vietnam)	Nguyễn Thành Phát	1.86 m (6 ft 1 in)	80 kg (176 lb)	28 – 10 January 1998
F	98	(Vietnam)	Trần Văn Trung	1.86 m (6 ft 1 in)	66 kg (146 lb)	27 – 26 December 1998

Head coach

- (United States) Erik Olsen

Assistant coach(es)

Legend

- (C) Team captain
- (HP) Heritage player
- Injured

- Roster
Updated: 29 March 2019
