= Danang Dragons =

Basketball team in Vietnam

- Leagues: VBA
- Founded: 2016
- Arena: 5th Military Region Arena
- Capacity: 3,200
- Location: Danang, Vietnam
- Team colours: Orange, Black
- Head coach: (United States) Todd Purves
- Championships: 1 (2016)
- Website: www.vba.vn/dragons
Home	Away

The Danang Dragons are a Vietnamese professional basketball team based in Danang, Vietnam. They play in the Vietnam Basketball Association.

== Season-by-season record ==
Season	Coach	Regular Season				Post Season			
Season	Coach	Won	Lost	Win %	Finish	Won	Lost	Win %	Result
2016	Donte' Hill	4	12	.250	5th	5	0	1.000	League Champions
2017	Donte' Hill	2	13	.133	6th	Did not qualify			
2018	Donte' Hill	3	12	.200	5th	Did not qualify			
2019	Phan Thanh Canh	5	10	.333	6th	Did not qualify			
2020	Phan Thanh Canh	5	7	.417	5th	Did not qualify			
2021	Phan Thanh Canh	5	2	.714	3rd	1	0	1.000	Quarterfinals; Season cut short due to COVID-19
2022	Phan Thanh Canh	4	8	.333	7th	Did not qualify			
2023	Todd Purves	1	17	.055	7th	Did not qualify			
2024	Todd Purves	7	13	.350	5th	Did not qualify			
2025	Hoang The Vinh	8	10	.444	5th	Did not qualify			
2026	Hoang The Vinh	0	20	.000	6th	Did not qualify			
Totals		44	124	.262		6	0	1.000	1 League Championship

== Current roster ==
Note: Flags indicate national team eligibility at FIBA-sanctioned events. Players may hold other non-FIBA nationalities not displayed.

Danang Dragons roster
Players
Coaches

Pos.	No.	Nat.	Name	Ht.	Wt.	DOB (YYYY-MM-DD)
G	2	(United States)	Jermaine Marrow Jr. (IP)	1.83 m (6 ft 0 in)	82 kg (181 lb)	37 – 7 June 1989
F	15	(United States)	Jairus Holder (IP)	1.86 m (6 ft 1 in)	86 kg (190 lb)	41 – 9 March 1985
G	3	(Canada)	Michael Soy (HP)	1.82 m (6 ft 0 in)	78 kg (172 lb)	29 – 15 April 1997
G	0	(Vietnam)	Trần Xuân Hoài Bão	1.77 m (5 ft 10 in)	65 kg (143 lb)	28 – 8 January 1998
G/F	2	(Vietnam)	Nguyễn Văn Thành	1.82 m (6 ft 0 in)	75 kg (165 lb)	26 – 29 January 2000
F	5	(Vietnam)	Mai Phước Thịnh	1.93 m (6 ft 4 in)	75 kg (165 lb)	25 – 5 June 2001
G	12	(Vietnam)	Triệu Hùng Minh	1.78 m (5 ft 10 in)	73 kg (161 lb)	39 – 9 June 1987
G	14	(Vietnam)	Đào Lập Xuân	1.78 m (5 ft 10 in)	71 kg (157 lb)	31 – 27 January 1995
F/C	23	(Vietnam)	Phạm Đức Kiên	1.98 m (6 ft 6 in)	75 kg (165 lb)	28 – 5 February 1998
G/F	29	(Vietnam)	Dương Đức Trí	1.82 m (6 ft 0 in)	72 kg (159 lb)	24 – 29 January 2002
F	33	(Vietnam)	Võ Thái Cường	1.91 m (6 ft 3 in)	85 kg (187 lb)	29 – 1 January 1997
F	77	(Vietnam)	Nguyễn Kỳ Quan	1.88 m (6 ft 2 in)	85 kg (187 lb)	29 – 21 April 1997
G	98	(Vietnam)	Triệu Hán Minh (C)	1.78 m (5 ft 10 in)	73 kg (161 lb)	39 – 9 June 1987

Head coach

- (Vietnam) Phan Thanh Cảnh

Assistant coach(es)

- (Sweden) Stefan Nguyen

Legend

- (C) Team captain
- (HP) Heritage player
- Injured

- Roster
Updated: 15 May 2021
