= Nha Trang Dolphins =

Vietnamese professional basketball team

- Nickname: Beach City Boys
- Leagues: Vietnam Basketball Association
- Founded: 2020
- Arena: Nha Trang University Sports Arena
- Team colours: Sky blue, Yellow
- President: (Vietnam) Tran Thi Kim Ha
- Head coach: (United States) Christopher Daleo
- Website: www.vba.vn/dolphins

The Nha Trang Dolphins is a Vietnamese professional basketball team founded in 2020 and based in Nha Trang, Khanh Hoa, Vietnam. They play in the Vietnam Basketball Association.

== Season-by-season record ==
| Season | Coach | Regular Season | | | | Post Season | | | |
| Season | Coach | Won | Lost | Win % | Finish | Won | Lost | Win % | Result |
|---|---|---|---|---|---|---|---|---|---|
| 2020 | Ryan Marchand | 4 | 8 | .333 | 6th | Did not qualify | | | |
| 2021 | Robert Newson | Season canceled due to COVID-19 | | | | | | | |
| 2022 | Todd Purves | 7 | 5 | .583 | 3rd | 0 | 2 | .000 | Semi-finals |
| 2023 | Predrag Lukic | 12 | 6 | .667 | 3rd | 3 | 3 | .500 | Runner-up |
| 2024 | Chris Daleo | 11 | 9 | .550 | 4th | 0 | 2 | .000 | Semi-finals |
| 2025 | Todd Purves | 12 | 6 | .667 | 2nd | 2 | 4 | .333 | Runner-up |
| 2026 | Todd Purves | 12 | 8 | .600 | 3rd | 0 | 2 | .000 | Semi-finals |
| Totals | | 58 | 42 | .580 | | 5 | 13 | .278 | |

== Current roster ==
Note: Flags indicate national team eligibility at FIBA-sanctioned events. Players may hold other non-FIBA nationalities not displayed.

Nha Trang Dolphins roster
Players
Coaches

| Pos. | No. | Nat. | Name | Ht. | Wt. | DOB (YYYY-MM-DD) |
|---|---|---|---|---|---|---|
| F | 7 | (United States) | Mykal Daveon Jenkins | 2.02 m (6 ft 8 in) | 98 kg (216 lb) | 26 – 15 June 2000 |
| F | 23 | (England) | Joe-Junior Mvuezolo | 1.97 m (6 ft 6 in) | 86 kg (190 lb) | 30 – 1 June 1996 |
| F/C | 32 | (United States) (Vietnam) | Dominique Tham (HP) | 1.95 m (6 ft 5 in) | 109 kg (240 lb) | 29 – 3 November 1996 |
| G | 0 | (Vietnam) | Phùng Quốc Hưng | 1.85 m (6 ft 1 in) | 78 kg (172 lb) | 24 – 10 December 2001 |
| F/C | 1 | (Vietnam) | Đậu Trung Kiên | 1.90 m (6 ft 3 in) | 82 kg (181 lb) | 26 – 30 July 2000 |
| G/F | 2 | (Vietnam) | Võ Huy Hoàn | 1.83 m (6 ft 0 in) | 70 kg (154 lb) | 27 – 7 October 1998 |
| G | 11 | (Vietnam) | Nguyễn Thành Đạt | 1.75 m (5 ft 9 in) | 76 kg (168 lb) | 37 – 17 April 1989 |
| G/F | 12 | (Vietnam) | Hứa Kỳ Anh | 1.90 m (6 ft 3 in) | 90 kg (198 lb) | 23 – 12 February 2003 |
| G/F | 15 | (Vietnam) | Sơn Minh Tâm | 1.95 m (6 ft 5 in) | 85 kg (187 lb) | 26 – 28 November 1999 |
| G | 3 | (Vietnam) | Nguyễn Hoàng Phúc | 1.80 m (5 ft 11 in) | 67 kg (148 lb) | 23 – 11 April 2003 |
| G | 4 | (Vietnam) | Huỳnh Thanh Tâm | 1.70 m (5 ft 7 in) | 70 kg (154 lb) | 27 – 11 August 1999 |
| G | 8 | (Vietnam) | Phạm Nhật Thái Quang | 1.77 m (5 ft 10 in) | 72 kg (159 lb) | 20 – 31 May 2006 |
| G | 84 | (Vietnam) | Huỳnh Vĩnh Quang | 1.74 m (5 ft 9 in) | 70 kg (154 lb) | 27 – 11 January 1999 |

Head coach

- (United States) Christopher Daleo

Assistant coach(es)

- (Vietnam) Nguyễn Trần Minh Trí

Legend

- (C) Team captain
- (HP) Heritage player
- Injured

- Roster
Updated: 1 April 2019

== Head coach ==
- (United States) Ryan Marchand (2020)
- (England) Robert Newson (2021)
- (United States) Todd Purves (2022)
- (Serbia) Predrag Lukic (2023)
- (United States) Christopher Daleo (2024-now)
