= Hanoi Buffaloes =

- Leagues: VBA
- Founded: 2016
- Arena: HUST Arena
- Capacity: 3,500
- Location: Hanoi, Vietnam
- Team colours: Blue, orange, white
- President: Le Minh Thanh
- Head coach: Matt Van Pelt
- Ownership: Hanoi Buffaloes JSC
- Website: http://www.hnbuffaloes.com
Home	Away

The Hanoi Buffaloes are a Vietnamese professional basketball team based in Hanoi, the capital of Vietnam. They play in the Vietnam Basketball Association.

== Season-by-season record ==
Season	Coach	Regular season				Postseason			
Season	Coach	Won	Lost	Win %	Finish	Won	Lost	Win %	Result
2016	Todd Purves	9	7	.563	3rd	1	2	.333	Semi-finals
2017	Todd Purves	8	7	.533	4th	0	2	.000	Semi-finals
2018	Todd Purves	9	6	.600	3rd	2	3	.400	Finals
2019	Lee Tao Dana	7	8	.467	5th	Did not qualify			
2020	Eric Weissling	6	6	.500	3rd	0	2	.000	Semi-finals
2021	Eric Weissling	3	4	.429	5th	1	1	.500	Semi-finals; Season cut short due to COVID-19
2022	Eric Weissling	7	5	.583	2nd	2	3	.400	Finals
2023	Erik Rashad	13	5	.722	2nd	0	2	.000	Semi-finals
2024	Erik Rashad	13	7	.650	2nd	0	2	.000	Semi-finals
2025	Matt Van Pelt	17	1	.944	1st	5	0	1.000	Champions
2026	Matt Van Pelt	19	1	.950	1st	3	3	0.500	Finals
Totals		111	57	.661		11	17	.393	

== Current roster ==
Note: Flags indicate national team eligibility at FIBA-sanctioned events. Players may hold other non-FIBA nationalities not displayed.

Hanoi Buffaloes roster
Players
Coaches

Pos.	No.	Nat.	Name	Ht.
PF	2	(United States)	AJ Bramah (I)	1.98 m (6 ft 6 in)
F	25	(United States)	Udun Osakue (IP)	1.94 m (6 ft 4 in)	91 kg (201 lb)	33 – 14 December 1992
F	44	(United States)	Anthony January Jr. (IP)	2.05 m (6 ft 9 in)	100 kg (220 lb)	33 – 16 June 1993
F	23	(United States) (Vietnam)	Tam Dinh (HP)	1.91 m (6 ft 3 in)	90 kg (198 lb)	36 – 10 April 1990
F	1	(Vietnam)	Đinh Tiến Công	1.86 m (6 ft 1 in)	80 kg (176 lb)	30 – 10 January 1996
F	5	(Vietnam)	Vũ Ngọc Khánh	1.85 m (6 ft 1 in)	80 kg (176 lb)	24 – 21 May 2002
G	7	(Vietnam)	Nguyễn Tiến Dương	1.78 m (5 ft 10 in)	66 kg (146 lb)	36 – 13 March 1990
G	11	(Vietnam)	Phạm Công Minh	1.75 m (5 ft 9 in)	65 kg (143 lb)	24 – 2 November 2002
G	20	(Vietnam)	Tô Ngọc Khánh	1.78 m (5 ft 10 in)	74 kg (163 lb)	24 – 20 February 2002
F	25	(Vietnam)	Vũ Ngọc Khánh	1.85 m (6 ft 1 in)	80 kg (176 lb)	25 – 25 May 2001
F	29	(Vietnam)	Trần Minh Hiếu	1.86 m (6 ft 1 in)	100 kg (220 lb)	28 – 13 September 1998
G	30	(Vietnam)	Nguyễn Huy Hoàng	1.78 m (5 ft 10 in)	65 kg (143 lb)	25 – 21 November 2001
F	32	(Vietnam)	Đinh Toàn Quốc	1.95 m (6 ft 5 in)	86 kg (190 lb)	22 – 1 August 2004
F	34	(Vietnam)	Phạm Đức Kiên	1.98 m (6 ft 6 in)	80 kg (176 lb)	28 – 5 February 1998
G	81	(Vietnam)	Nguyễn Ngọc Sơn	1.84 m (6 ft 0 in)	75 kg (165 lb)	24 – 29 July 2002
G	86	(Vietnam)	Nguyễn Văn Thắng	1.83 m (6 ft 0 in)	80 kg (176 lb)	25 – 12 August 2001
F	88	(Vietnam)	Nguyễn Đường Quang Anh	1.83 m (6 ft 0 in)	78 kg (172 lb)	28 – 26 October 1998
F	99	(Vietnam)	Vũ Việt Hoàng	1.83 m (6 ft 0 in)	74 kg (163 lb)	27 – 21 February 1999

Head coach

- (Mexico) Eric Weissling

Assistant coach(es)

- (Vietnam) Hoàng Thế Vinh
- (Vietnam) Quý Di Tâm

Legend

- (C) Team captain
- (HP) Heritage player
- Injured

- Roster
Updated: 7 June 2023
