= Vietnam Basketball Association =

Professional men's basketball league in Vietnam

Vietnam Basketball Association (VBA)
- Current season, competition or edition: 2026 VBA season
- Sport: Basketball
- Founded: 2016; 10 years ago
- First season: 2016
- No. of teams: 6
- Country: Vietnam
- Continent: FIBA Asia
- Most recent champions: Saigon Heat (6th title)
- Most titles: Saigon Heat (6 titles)
- Broadcasters: FPT Play, YouTube (online streaming)
- Website: vba.vn

The Vietnam Basketball Association, abbreviated as VBA, is a Vietnamese national professional basketball league founded in 2016. It runs an annual tournament, the Vietnam Pro Basketball League (Vietnamese: Giải Bóng rổ Chuyên nghiệp Việt Nam).

== History ==
The formation of the VBA was announced by charter team Saigon Heat following their completion of the 2015–16 ASEAN Basketball League season. Leading up to the inaugural season, the VBA expected that six teams would compete in the new league. However, only five teams were officially unveiled. To oversee league operations, the VBA looked to the Philippines for personnel with extensive basketball experience. Tonichi Pujante was named the inaugural league commissioner.

== Teams ==
Locations of the VBA teams

The VBA started its inaugural season with five teams. The Thang Long Warriors was added as the sixth team in the 2017 season, followed by the Nha Trang Dolphins as the seventh in the 2020 season.

Team	Based in	Home venue	Founded	Joined	Head coach	Title(s)
Cantho Catfish	Ho Chi Minh City (Xuan Hoa)	Ho Xuan Huong Arena	2016		(Vietnam) Phan Thanh Canh	1
Danang Dragons	Da Nang	5th Military Region Arena	2016		(Vietnam) Hoang The Vinh	1
Hanoi Buffaloes	Hanoi	Xuan Dinh Arena	2016		(United States) Matt Van Pelt	1
Ho Chi Minh City Wings	Ho Chi Minh City (Xuan Hoa)	Ho Xuan Huong Arena	2016		(Vietnam) Le Tran Minh Nghia	0
Nha Trang Dolphins	Nha Trang	Khanh Hoa Provincial Gymnasium	2020		(United States) Todd Purves	0
Saigon Heat	Ho Chi Minh City (Tan My)	MLC Arena	2011	2016	(Vietnam) Vu The Cang	6

== Regular season and playoffs ==
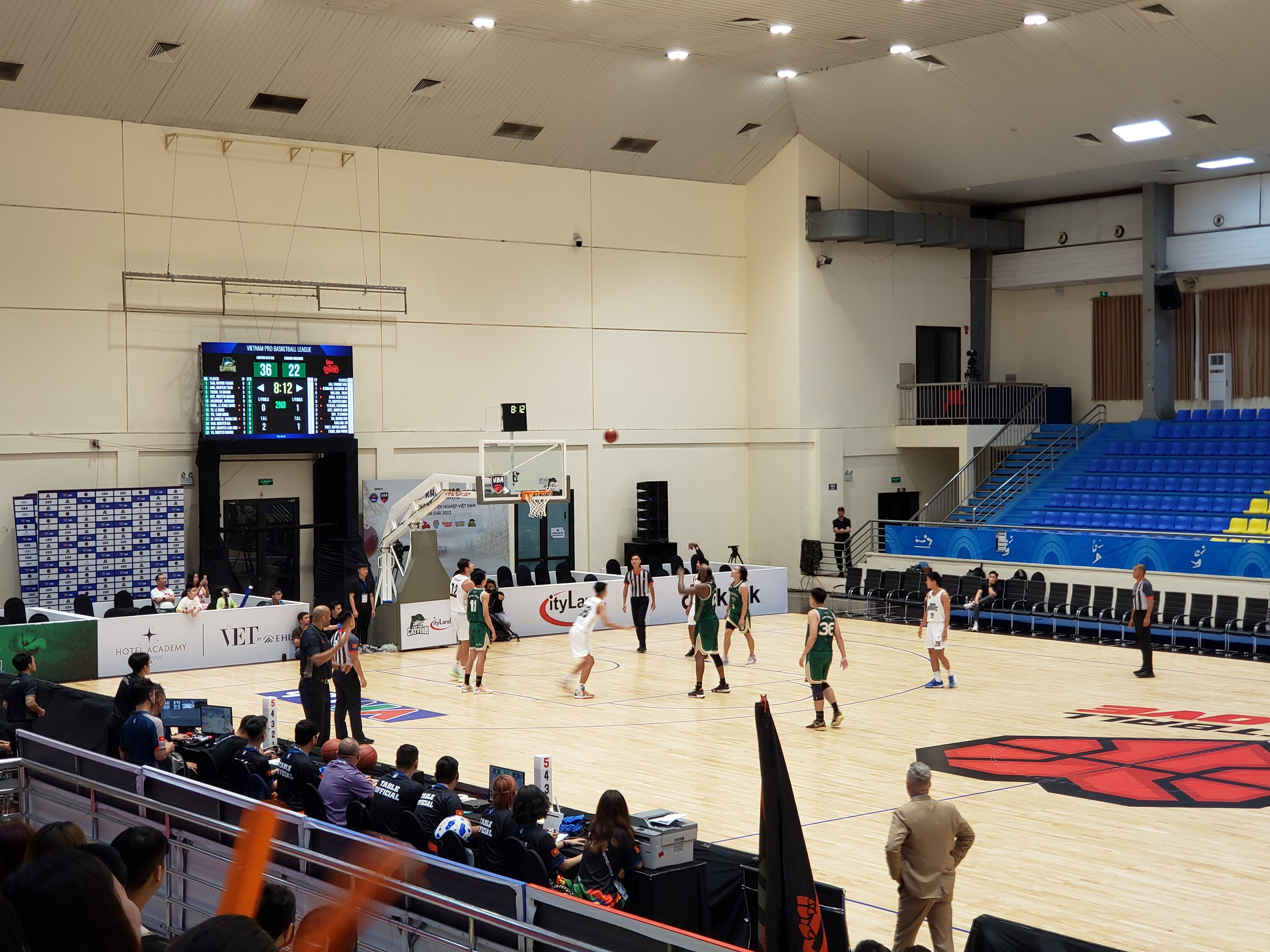
A VBA regular season match between Cantho Catfish and Danang Dragons, Hanoi, June 2023

Following the summer break, the preseason typically begins in May. During this period, the teams build their 13–16-man rosters, with each team allowed to carry one foreign, two overseas Vietnamese, and 10 to 13 local players. The VBA regular season begins at the start of June and runs until the end of September. Each team plays 12 games, divided between six home and six away matches. At the end of the regular season, the league's overall leader is awarded the Fans' Shield.

At the conclusion of the regular season, the playoffs begin. In the inaugural season, all teams are eligible for the tournament style playoffs. However, the teams that finish in the #4 and #5 seeds must meet each other in a wildcard game to proceed to the playoffs. The winner of the game meets the #1 seeded team. From the 2017 season onwards, there are six teams, and the wildcard game is scrapped. #1 will play #4 and the #2 seeded team meets the #3 seeded team in a best-of-three series. The winners then progress to the VBA finals.

== Results by year ==
Season	Finalists				Losing semi-finalists	
Season	Champions	Results		Runner-up	Losing semi-finalists	
2016	Danang Dragons	2	0	Ho Chi Minh City Wings	Saigon Heat	Hanoi Buffaloes
2017	Thang Long Warriors	3	2	Cantho Catfish	Saigon Heat	Hanoi Buffaloes
2018	Cantho Catfish	3	0	Hanoi Buffaloes	Saigon Heat	Thang Long Warriors
2019	Saigon Heat	3	2	Cantho Catfish	Ho Chi Minh City Wings	Thang Long Warriors
2020	Saigon Heat	3	1	Thang Long Warriors	Cantho Catfish	Hanoi Buffaloes
2022	Saigon Heat	3	0	Hanoi Buffaloes	Ho Chi Minh City Wings	Nha Trang Dolphins
2023	Saigon Heat	3	1	Nha Trang Dolphins	Hanoi Buffaloes	Thang Long Warriors
2024	Saigon Heat	3	0	Cantho Catfish	Hanoi Buffaloes	Nha Trang Dolphins
2025	Hanoi Buffaloes	3	0	Nha Trang Dolphins	Saigon Heat	Cantho Catfish
2026	Saigon Heat	3	1	Hanoi Buffaloes	Nha Trang Dolphins	Ho Chi Minh City Wings

=== Champions ===
Team	Champions	Runners-up	Total	Winning year(s)	Runner-up year(s)
Saigon Heat	6	0	6	2019, 2020, 2022, 2023, 2024, 2026	-
Cantho Catfish	1	3	4	2018	2017, 2019, 2024
Hanoi Buffaloes	1	3	4	2025	2018, 2022, 2026
Thang Long Warriors	1	1	2	2017	2020
Danang Dragons	1	0	1	2016	-
Ho Chi Minh City Wings	0	1	1	-	2016
Nha Trang Dolphins	0	1	1	-	2023, 2025

== See also ==
- Sport in Vietnam
- Vietnam national basketball team
- FIBA Asia Champions Cup
- ASEAN Basketball League
