= John Todd Purves =

American basketball coach (born 1972)

Personal information
- Born: June 7, 1972 (age 54) United States
- Position: Head coach
- Coaching career: 2005–present

Career history

Coaching
- 2005–2006: Cal State Northridge (assistant)
- 2011–2013: Indonesia Warriors
- 2013–2015: Petron/San Miguel (consultant)
- 2017–2018: Satria Muda Pertamina Jakarta
- 2019: Macau Wolf Warriors
- 2023–present: Vietnam
- 2024–2025: Pacific Caesar

Career highlights
- As head coach: ABL champion (2012); IBL champion (2018); As consultant: PBA champion (2014–15 Philippine)

John Todd Purves (June 7, 1972) is an American basketball coach. Purves won the ASEAN Basketball League title in the 2012 season with the Indonesia Warriors and the Indonesian Basketball League title in the 2018 season with Satria Muda Pertamina Jakarta.

== Career ==
Before entering Asian basketball scene, Purves held positions as director of basketball operations of the Sacramento State Hornets from 2001 to 2005, being an assistant coach at Cal State Northridge from 2005 to 2006, and being a video intern from 2006 to 2007 and video coordinator from 2007 to 2012 of the Sacramento Kings in the NBA.

He was even offered to be a Philadelphia 76ers' coaching staff member, but he declined to join Indonesia Warriors.

He worked in Asian leagues, including the Indonesia Warriors for the ABL in 2011, and won a championship for the team.

He served as active team consultant replacing Rajko Toroman for Petron Blaze Boosters from 2013. As team consultant, he helped his team to reach 2013 PBA Governors' Cup finals, but lost to eventual champion, San Mig Coffee Mixers. His role as an active consultant ended when Leo Austria was hired as head coach in 2014, and demoted as consultant with minimal role.

He returned to Indonesia in 2017 and served for the Satria Muda Pertamina Jakarta of the Indonesian Basketball League and won a championship for the team, but left after 2018.

He returned to the ABL and became the head coach of Macau Wolf Warriors.

In 2024, he again returned to Indonesia to become the head coach of Pacific Caesar Surabaya of the IBL.
