= Canadian International School Vietnam =

- Trường Quốc tế Canada
- Canadian International School Vietnam campus in Ho Chi Minh City

Location
- No.7 Road 23, Zone A – Phú Mỹ Hưng City Center; Tân Mỹ, Ho Chi Minh City, Vietnam; 10.7144°N 106.7298°E

Information
- Type: Private; International school
- Established: 2009; 17 years ago
- Status: Active
- Sister school: Sedbergh Vietnam - BCIS (SSV) Canadian International School (CIS) Einstein School.
- School board: The Canadian International School System
- School district: The River Park, Phú Mỹ Hưng
- Principal: Dr. Chandra McGowan
- Campus: Phú Mỹ Hưng Campus
- Accreditation: International Baccalaureate; Council of International Schools
- Website: cis.edu.vn

Canadian International School Vietnam (CIS; Vietnamese: Trường Quốc tế Canada) is a private international school based in Ho Chi Minh City, Vietnam. The school belongs to the Canadian International School System (CISS), along with 2 other campuses: Sedbergh Vietnam - BCIS Campus and Sedbergh Vietnam - CVK Campus (For Kindergarten)

Set up in 2009 by Khoi Nguyen Education Group (KNE Group), CIS was advised by the District School Board of Niagara, becoming the first international school in Vietnam to offer a Canadian curriculum. In 2010, a $21 million campus was launched in Bình Chánh district, serving 30 classes from kindergarten to grade 10. Established in 2014, the current campus in Phu My Hung (District 7) has a total area of 39,000 m^{2} with a total investment of $46 million. That same year, CIS began its partnership with Toronto District School Board, Canada's largest school board. CIS officially received investment from EQuest Education Group in December 2022, becoming the first international school in Vietnam to offer a Canadian curriculum.The Canadian International School (CIS) is also an official member of the Council of International Schools.

CIS is among international schools recognized by the Ministry of Education and Training (Vietnam). Canadian International School Vietnam offers an integrated curriculum that draws on the CIS Diploma, Growing Success assessment framework, and elements of the International Baccalaureate and Advanced Placement programmes. For Grades 11 and 12, the school offers International Baccalaureate Diploma Programme pathways, including the full IB Diploma, IB course certificates, and a CIS Diploma pathway. Since 2015, CIS has been an accredited International Baccalaureate school.

CIS has 41 sports teams as of 2021. Its stadium, named MLC Sports, has been the home field of Vietnamese professional basketball team Saigon Heat since the 2014 season, after removing from Tân Bình Gymnasium.

In September 2021, Excelsior Capital Vietnam Partners (ECVP), a fund that focuses on Vietnam and is part of the Hong Kong–based private equity firm Excelsior Capital Asia, announced that it had invested in KNE Group, the founder of CIS. A year later, Vietnam-based education group EQuest, which is backed by private equity firm KKR, acquired a controlling interest in KNE Group. According to DealStreetAsia, the investment values KNE Group at nearly $100 million and ECVP has exited the company.

In 2024, the Canadian International School was accredited by the Council of International Schools and Cognia.
