= 2017 VBA season =

Vietnam Basketball Association
- Season: 2017
- Duration: September 5, 2017 – November 5, 2017 (Regular season); November 8, 2017 – November 12, 2017 (Playoffs); November 19, 2017 – December 3, 2017 (Finals)
- Games played: 54
- Teams: 6

Finals
- Champions: Thang Long Warriors
- Runners-up: Cantho Catfish
- Semifinalists: Hanoi Buffaloes; Saigon Heat

Awards
- Domestic MVP: (Vietnam) Tô Quang Trung (Thang Long)
- International MVP: (United States) Jaywuan Hill (Thang Long)
- Heritage MVP: (United States) Tam Dinh (Cantho)

The 2017 VBA season was the second season of the Vietnam Basketball Association. The regular season began on September 5, 2017 and end on November 5, 2017. The playoffs began on November 8, 2017 and ended on December 3, 2017, with the Thang Long Warriors beating the Cantho Catfish in 5 games to clinch their first VBA title.

== Teams ==
=== Venues and locations ===
Locations of teams in 2017 VBA

Team	Home city	Arena	Capacity
Cantho Catfish	Cần Thơ	Da Nang Sports Arena	
Danang Dragons	Đà Nẵng	Quan Khu 5 Sports Arena	
Hanoi Buffaloes	Hà Nội	Bach Khoa Sports Arena	
Hochiminh City Wings	Ho Chi Minh City	Ho Xuan Huong Sports Arena	
Saigon Heat	Ho Chi Minh City	CIS Sports Arena	
Thang Long Warriors	Hà Nội	Su Pham Sports Arena	

=== Personnel and sponsorship ===
Team	Head coach	Captain	Kit manufacturer
Cantho Catfish	(United States) Kevin Yurkus	(Vietnam) Lê Hiếu Thành	
Danang Dragons	(United States) Donte' Hill	(United States) Horace Nguyen	
Hanoi Buffaloes	(United States) Todd Purves	(Vietnam) Nguyễn Thành Đạt	Alien Sports
Hochiminh Ciy Wings	(Philippines) Ricky Magallanes	(Vietnam) Triệu Hán Minh	
Saigon Heat	(United States) David Singleton	(United States) David Arnold	
Thang Long Warriors	(United States) Lee Tao Dana	(Canada) Ryan Le	

=== Managerial changes ===
Team	Outgoing manager	Position in table	Replaced with
Hochiminh City Wings	(Finland) Mika Turunen	Pre-season	(Philippines) Ricky Magallanes
Thang Long Warriors	Expansion	Pre-season	(United States) Lee Tao Dana
Saigon Heat	(United Kingdom) Anthony Garbelotto	Pre-season	(United States) David Singleton
Cantho Catfish	(United States) David Singleton	Pre-season	(United States) Kevin Yurkus

== Draft ==
The Thang Long Warriors selected Justin Young first in the inaugural VBA Heritage Player Draft.

Rnd.	Pick	Player	Nationality (Note: Nationality indicates the player's national team or representative nationality. If a player has not competed at the international level, then the nationality indicates the national team which the player is eligible to represent according to FIBA rules.)	Team	School / club team
1	1	Justin Young	United States	Thang Long Warriors	Hochiminh City Wings / Hanoi Buffaloes
1	2	Vincent Nguyen	Netherlands	Hanoi Buffaloes	Den Bosch
1	3	Henry Nguyen	United States	Hochiminh City Wings	
2	4	Anthony Vo	United States	Hochiminh City Wings	
2	5	Stefan Nguyen	Sweden	Danang Dragons	Danang Dragons / Saigon Heat
2	6	Sang Dinh	United States	Cantho Catfish	Cantho Catfish
2	7	Ryan Le	Canada	Thang Long Warriors	Saigon Heat
2	8	Ryan Arnold	United States	Hanoi Buffaloes	Hanoi Buffaloes
2	9	Jimmy Kien	Australia	Saigon Heat	Danang Dragons

== Import players ==
Each team is allowed 2 heritage players and 1 foreign player.

Team	Heritage 1	Heritage 2	Foreign
Cantho Catfish	(United States) Tam Dinh	(United States) Sang Dinh	(United States) DeAngelo Hamilton
Danang Dragons	(United States) Horace Nguyen	(United States) Khoa Tran	(Canada) Rudolphe Joly
Hanoi Buffaloes	(Netherlands) Vincent Nguyen		(United States) Jason Carter
Hochiminh City Wings	(United States) Henry Nguyen		(United States) Bilal Richardson
Saigon Heat	(United States) David Arnold	(United States) Anthony Vo	(United States) Darius Lewis
Thang Long Warriors	(United States) Justin Young	(Canada) Ryan Le	(United States) Jaywuan Hill

== Regular season ==
=== Standings ===
Pos	Team	Pld	W	L	PF	PA	PD	PCT	GB	Qualification	TLW	SGH	CTC	HNB	HCM	DND
1	Thang Long Warriors	15	12	3	1160	1058	+102	.800	—	Advance to Playoffs	—	69–66	79–67; 87-90	71–61; 80-69	56–67	96–65
2	Saigon Heat	15	9	6	1147	1084	+63	.600	3	Advance to Playoffs	86–78; 69-75	—	72–59; 62-78	84–77; 64-72	74–79	93–78
3	Cantho Catfish	15	9	6	1210	1151	+59	.600	3	Advance to Playoffs	72–74	80–85 (OT)	—	83–86 (OT)	85–71; 99-63	76–68; 105-99
4	Hanoi Buffaloes	15	8	7	1067	1049	+18	.533	4	Advance to Playoffs	66–71	71–72	71–79; 75-77	—	57–55; 65-60	66–60; 83-61
5	Hochiminh City Wings	15	5	10	1041	1116	−75	.333	7		71–79; 73-84	59–67; 63-102	85–67	74–81	—	84–63
6	Danang Dragons	15	2	13	1045	1212	−167	.133	10		64–79; 72-82	82–72; 64-79	74–93	58–67	74–77; 63-60	—

Source: vba.vn

== Playoffs ==
Semifinals
1 Thang Long Warriors	82	69
4 Hanoi Buffaloes	57	58
2 Saigon Heat	80	68
3 Cantho Catfish	85	76

Finals
1 Thang Long Warriors	78	73	74	79	95
3 Cantho Catfish	83	68	77	64	80

== Statistics ==
=== Team statistic leaders ===
Category	Team	Statistic
Points per game	Cantho Catfish	79.2
Rebounds per game	Cantho Catfish	41.0
Steals per game	Cantho Catfish	11.3
Blocks per game	Cantho Catfish	4.7
FG%	Cantho Catfish	0.480
FT%	Hanoi Buffaloes	0.650
3FG%	Saigon Heat	0.310

== Awards ==
=== Yearly awards ===
- Season MVP: Jaywuan Hill (Thang Long Warriors)
- Season Local MVP: Tô Quang Trung (Thang Long Warriors)
- Season Heritage MVP: Tam Dinh (Cantho Catfish)
- Defensive Player of the Year: DeAngelo Hamilton (Cantho Catfish)
- Youth Man of the Year: Nguyễn Hoàng Tuấn (Danang Dragons)
- Sixth Man of the Year: Nguyễn Huỳnh Hải (Saigon Heat)
- Coach of the Year: Kevin Yurkus (Cantho Catfish)

=== MVP of the Week ===
For week ending	Player	Team	Ref.
10 September 2017	Tam Dinh (1/1)	Cantho Catfish	1
17 September 2017	DeAngelo Hamilton (1/2)	Cantho Catfish	
24 September 2017	Lê Ngọc Tú (1/1)	Saigon Heat	3
1 October 2017	David Arnold (1/2)	Saigon Heat	4
8 October 2017	Vincent Nguyen (1/1)	Hanoi Buffaloes	5
15 October 2017	DeAngelo Hamilton (2/2)	Cantho Catfish	6
22 October 2017	David Arnold (2/2)	Saigon Heat	7
29 October 2017	Jaywuan Hill (1/2)	Thang Long Warriors	8
5 November 2017	Jaywuan Hill (2/2)	Thang Long Warriors	9

== Notable occurrences ==
- The VBA held their annual tryouts for players of Vietnamese heritage at Hope International University in Fullerton, CA on May 6–7, 2017.
- The Thang Long Warriors became the league's 6th franchise.
- On May 19, the Saigon Heat and head coach Anthony Garbelotto mutually agreed to terminate his contract after a disappointing season with the ASEAN Basketball League team.
- On June 14, the inaugural VBA Draft was held in HCMC for unsigned heritage players from the 2016 season and selects from the US tryouts.
- The first ever trade in league history happened on June 28 with the Hochiminh City Wings trading the draft rights for Jimmy Kien to the Saigon Heat for the draft rights for Anthony Vo.
