= Tô Quang Trung =

Vietnamese basketball player

No. 5 – Thang Long Warriors
- Position: Shooting guard
- League: VBA

Personal information
- Born: June 8, 1984 (age 40); Cần Thơ, Vietnam
- Listed height: 5 ft 11 in (1.80 m)
- Listed weight: 176 lb (80 kg)

Career information
- Playing career: 2011–present

Career history
- 2011–2013, 2015–2016: Saigon Heat
- 2016: Cantho Catfish
- 2017–present: Thang Long Warriors

Career highlights and awards
- VBA Local Most Valuable Player (2017); VBA Champion (2017)

Tô Quang Trung (born June 8, 1984) is a Vietnamese professional basketball player for the Thang Long Warriors of the Vietnam Basketball Association (VBA) and Saigon Heat of the ASEAN Basketball League (ABL).

== Pro career ==
Quang Trung joined the Heat before the start of the 2013 ABL season.

== Career statistics ==
Legend
GP	Games played	GS	Games started	MPG	Minutes per game
FG%	Field goal percentage	3P%	3-point field goal percentage	FT%	Free throw percentage
RPG	Rebounds per game	APG	Assists per game	SPG	Steals per game
BPG	Blocks per game	PPG	Points per game	**Bold**	Career high

=== VBA ===
Year	Team	GP	GS	MPG	FG%	3P%	FT%	RPG	APG	SPG	BPG	PPG
2016	Cantho	15	12	25.3	.310	.220	**.770**	**4.2**	**2.2**	.7	.1	7.4
2017	Thang Long	**21**	**16**	**30.1**	**.410**	**.340**	.730	2.9	2.1	**2.6**	.1	**14.5**
2018	Thang Long	16	3	19	.370	.300	.710	2.1	.9	1.2	.0	10.9
Career		52	31	25	.360	.290	.740	3.1	1.7	1.5	.0	10.9
