= 2020 VBA season =

Vietnam Basketball Association
- Season: 2020
- Duration: 15 October 2020 – 20 November 2020 (Regular season); 24 November 2020 - 27 November 2020 (Playoffs semi-finals); 2 December 2020 - 8 December 2020 (Finals)
- Games played: 50
- Teams: 7

Regular season
- Top seed: Saigon Heat
- Season MVP: (United States) Robert Crawford (Thang Long Warriors)

Finals
- Champions: Saigon Heat
- Runners-up: Thang Long Warriors
- Semifinalists: Cantho Catfish; Hanoi Buffaloes
- Finals MVP: (United States) Joshua Keyes (Saigon Heat)

Statistical leaders
| Points | (United States) Robert Crawford (Thang Long Warriors) | 26.6 |
| Rebounds | (United States) Leon Hampton (Cantho Catfish) | 22.2 |
| Assists | (United States) Christian Juzang (Saigon Heat) | 5.8 |

Records
- Biggest home win: 102-60
- Biggest away win: 59-90
- Winning streak: 7 (Saigon Heat)
- Losing streak: 5 (Hochiminh City Wings)

The 2020 VBA season was the fifth season of the Vietnam Basketball Association. The season was scheduled to start in May but was postponed due to the COVID-19 pandemic. The regular season began on 15 October 2020 and ended on 20 November. The playoffs semi-finals began on 24 November 2020 and ended on 28 November 2020. The Finals began on 2 December 2020 and ended on 8 December 2020 with the Saigon Heat defeating the Thang Long Warriors after 4 games.

== Teams ==
=== Venues and locations ===
Due to the COVID-19 pandemic, all games will be played in a bubble in Ho Chi Minh City. A stadium, nicknamed the VBA Arena, was constructed in Studio S4 on the campus of ZoOm Media.

=== Personnel and sponsorship ===
| Team | Head coach | Captain | Kit manufacturer |
|---|---|---|---|
| Cantho Catfish | (United States) Jordan Collins | | Actee |
| Danang Dragons | (Vietnam) Phan Thanh Cảnh | | Actee |
| Hanoi Buffaloes | (Mexico) Eric Weissling | | Actee |
| Hochiminh City Wings | (Lithuania) Gediminas Meiliunas | | Actee |
| Nha Trang Dolphins | (United States) Ryan Marchand | | Actee |
| Saigon Heat | (United States) Kevin Yurkus | | Hemero |
| Thang Long Warriors | (Serbia) Predrag Lukic | | Actee |

=== Heritage players ===
The following is the list of Vietnamese heritage players, which had played for their respective teams at least once. Each team can register 1 heritage player. Flags indicate the citizenship/s the player holds.

| Club | Heritage | Former Heritage |
|---|---|---|
| Cantho Catfish | (United States) Tam Dinh | |
| Danang Dragons | (United States) Richard Nguyen | (United States) Chris Dierker |
| Hanoi Buffaloes | (United States) Sang Dinh | |
| Hochiminh City Wings | (Netherlands) Vincent Nguyen | |
| Nha Trang Dolphins | (United States) Khoa Tran | |
| Saigon Heat | (United States) Christian Juzang | |
| Thang Long Warriors | (United States) Justin Young | |

=== Imports ===
The following is the list of imports, which had played for their respective teams at least once. Each team can register 1 import. Flags indicate the citizenship/s the player holds.

| Club | Import | Former Imports |
|---|---|---|
| Cantho Catfish | (United States) Leon Hampton | |
| Danang Dragon | (United States) Tyrell Williams | (United States) Darrell Miller |
| Hanoi Buffaloes | (United States) Mike Bell | |
| Hochiminh City Wings | (United States) Raheem Watts | |
| Nha Trang Dolphins | (United States) Lamontray Harris | |
| Saigon Heat | (United States) Joshua Keyes | |
| Thang Long Warriors | (United States) Robert Crawford | |

=== Managerial changes ===
| Team | Outgoing manager | Manner of departure | Date of vacancy | Position in table | Replaced with | Date of appointment |
|---|---|---|---|---|---|---|
| Hochiminh City Wings | (Serbia) Predrag Lukic | Contract expired | 18 September 2019 | Pre-season | (Lithuania) Gediminas Meiliunas | 20 January 2020 |
| Saigon Heat | (United States) David Singleton | Contract expired | 18 September 2019 | Pre-season | (United States) Kevin Yurkus | 11 June 2020 |
| Thang Long Warriors | (United States) Matt Juranek | Contract expired | 18 September 2019 | Pre-season | (Serbia) Predrag Lukic | 7 January 2020 |

== Regular season ==
=== Standings ===
| Pos | Team | Pld | W | L | PF | PA | PD | PCT | GB | Qualification | SGH | TLW | HNB | CTC | DND | NTD | HCM |
|---|---|---|---|---|---|---|---|---|---|---|---|---|---|---|---|---|---|
| 1 | Saigon Heat | 12 | 10 | 2 | 1037 | 815 | +222 | .833 | — | Advance to Playoffs | — | 62–79 | 81–62 | 102–60 | 93–60 | 88–64 | 85–68 |
| 2 | Thang Long Warriors | 12 | 8 | 4 | 905 | 832 | +73 | .667 | 2 | Advance to Playoffs | 78–76 | — | 60–73 | 81–87 | 74–84 | 63–62 | 67–64 |
| 3 | Hanoi Buffaloes | 12 | 6 | 6 | 934 | 933 | +1 | .500 | 4 | Advance to Playoffs | 71–97 | 52–79 | — | 97–86 | 72–79 | 81–62 | 72–62 |
| 4 | Cantho Catfish | 12 | 6 | 6 | 926 | 996 | −70 | .500 | 4 | Advance to Playoffs | 62–92 | 61–79 | 84–81 | — | 90–98 | 70–58 | 81–83 |
| 5 | Danang Dragons | 12 | 5 | 7 | 962 | 1030 | −68 | .417 | 5 | | 78–92 | 82–76 (OT) | 99–104 (OT) | 73–78 | — | 87–94 (OT) | 89–81 |
| 6 | Nha Trang Dolphins | 12 | 4 | 8 | 835 | 917 | −82 | .333 | 6 | | 59–90 | 63–80 | 79–77 | 68–80 | 86–56 | — | 77–67 |
| 7 | Hochiminh City Wings | 12 | 3 | 9 | 882 | 958 | −76 | .250 | 7 | | 74–79 | 66–89 | 65–92 | 84–87 | 90–77 | 78–63 | — |

Updated to match(es) played on 20 November 2020. Source: vba.vn

== Playoffs ==
=== Bracket ===
Semifinals
1 Saigon Heat | 77 | 93
4 Cantho Catfish | 67 | 80
2 Thang Long Warriors | 82 | 92
3 Hanoi Buffaloes | 78 | 76

Finals
1 Saigon Heat | 59 | 70 | 65 | 73
2 Thang Long Warriors | 55 | 74 | 53 | 54

=== Semifinals ===
Note: All times are ICT (UTC+7) as listed by the VBA. All games were played at the VBA Arena in Ho Chi Minh City.

==== (1) Saigon Heat vs. (4) Cantho Catfish ====
24 November
7:00pm

Box score

Saigon Heat 77, Cantho Catfish 67
Scoring by quarter: 22–16, 16–14, 21–16, 18–28
| Pts: Joshua Keyes 20; Rebs: Joshua Keyes 18; Asts: Joshua Keyes 7 | Pts: Dinh, Hampton 19 each Rebs: Leon Hampton 24; Asts: Leon Hampton 4 |
Saigon lead series, 1–0

VBA Arena, Ho Chi Minh City
Referees: Le Duc Anh, Francisco Olivar, Harry Santos

26 November
7:00pm

Box score

Cantho Catfish 80, Saigon Heat 93
Scoring by quarter: 29–26, 13–20, 24–23, 14–24
| Pts: Tam Dinh 32; Rebs: Leon Hampton 15; Asts: Le Hieu Thanh 6 | Pts: Joshua Keyes 29; Rebs: Joshua Keyes 22; Asts: Christian Juzang 9 |
Saigon wins series, 2–0

VBA Arena, Ho Chi Minh City
Referees: Dong Hyeon-lee, Le Duc Anh, Francisco Oivar

==== (2) Thang Long Warriors vs. (3) Hanoi Buffaloes ====
25 November
7:00pm

Box score

Thang Long Warriors 82, Hanoi Buffaloes 78
Scoring by quarter: 19–18, 23–19, 25–17, 15–24
| Pts: Robert Crawford 29; Rebs: Justin Young 12; Asts: Justin Young 7 | Pts: Mike Bell 21; Rebs: Mike Bell 26; Asts: Bell, Dinh 4 each |
Thang Long lead series, 1–0

VBA Arena, Ho Chi Minh City
Referees: Harry Santos, Khiem Nguyen Hoang, Dong Hyeon-lee

27 November
7:00pm

Box score

Hanoi Buffaloes 76, Thang Long Warriors 92
Scoring by quarter: 19–20, 13–23, 25–29, 19–20
| Pts: Mike Bell 24; Rebs: Mike Bell 24; Asts: Bell, Tien Cong 5 each | Pts: Robert Crawford 31; Rebs: Justin Young 20; Asts: Justin Young 9 |
Thang Long wins series, 2–0

VBA Arena, Ho Chi Minh City
Referees: Harry Santos, Le Truong Giang, Dong Hyeon-lee

=== Finals ===
Note: All times are ICT (UTC+7) as listed by the VBA. All games were played at the VBA Arena in Ho Chi Minh City.

==== (1) Saigon Heat vs. (2) Thang Long Warriors ====
2 December
7:00pm

Box score

Saigon Heat 59, Thang Long Warriors 55
Scoring by quarter: 23–12, 12–13, 13–18, 11–12
| Pts: Christian Juzang 21; Rebs: Joshua Keyes 25; Asts: Minh An, Phu Vinh 3 each | Pts: Dang Thai Hung 19; Rebs: Justin Young 13; Asts: Justin Young 6 |
Saigon lead series, 1–0

VBA Arena, Ho Chi Minh City
Referees: Francisco Olivar, Le Truong Giang, Harry Santos

4 December
7:00pm

Box score

Saigon Heat 70, Thang Long Warriors 74
Scoring by quarter: 21–13, 20–21, 11–21, 18–19
| Pts: Christian Juzang 30; Rebs: Joshua Keyes 15; Asts: Joshua Keyes 4 | Pts: Robert Crawford 28; Rebs: Robert Crawford 13; Asts: Justin Young 7 |
Series tied, 1–1

VBA Arena, Ho Chi Minh City
Referees: Dong Hyeon-lee, Le Truong Giang, Harry Santos

6 December
7:00pm

Box score

Thang Long Warriors 53, Saigon Heat 65
Scoring by quarter: 11–15, 13–14, 13–19, 16–17
| Pts: Dang Thai Hung 18; Rebs: Robert Crawford 12; Asts: Justin Young 4 | Pts: Johua Keyes 20; Rebs: Johua Keyes 21; Asts: Christian Juzang 5 |
Saigon lead series, 2–1

VBA Arena, Ho Chi Minh City
Referees: Harry Santos, Le Duc Anh, Francisco Olivar

8 December
7:00pm

Box score

Thang Long Warriors 54, Saigon Heat 73
Scoring by quarter: 10–23, 19–8, 11–20, 14–22
| Pts: Crawford, Van Hung 14 each Rebs: Robert Crawford 10; Asts: Nguyen Phu Hoang 5 | Pts: Vo Kim Ban 31; Rebs: Joshua Keyes 22; Asts: Christian Juzang 8 |
Saigon wins series, 3–1

VBA Arena, Ho Chi Minh City
Referees: Francisco Olivar, Le Truong Giang, Harry Santos

== Statistics ==
=== Individual statistic leaders ===
| Category | Player | Team | Statistic |
|---|---|---|---|
| Points per game | Robert Crawford | Thang Long Warriors | 26.6 |
| Rebounds per game | Leon Hampton | Cantho Catfish | 22.2 |
| Assists per game | Christian Juzang | Saigon Heat | 5.8 |
| Steals per game | Khoa Tran | Nha Trang Dolphins | 3.0 |
| Blocks per game | Leon Hampton | Cantho Catfish | 3.9 |
| Turnovers per game | Le Hieu Thanh | Cantho Catfish | 5.8 |
| Fouls per game | Nguyen Van Hung | Danang Dragons | 4.0 |
| Minutes per game | Tam Dinh | Cantho Catfish | 38.9 |
| FG% | Nguyen Huynh Phu Vinh | Saigon Heat | 56.3 |
| 3FG% | Le Quang | Saigon Heat | 52.9 |

=== Team statistic leaders ===
| Category | Team | Statistic |
|---|---|---|
| Points per game | Hanoi Buffaloes | 77.0 |
| Rebounds per game | Saigon Heat | 42.7 |
| Assists per game | Hanoi Buffaloes | 17.0 |
| Steals per game | Two teams | 9.5 |
| Blocks per game | Cantho Catfish | 4.5 |
| Turnovers per game | Hanoi Buffaloes | 18.5 |
| FG% | Thang Long Warriors | 38.6% |
| FT% | Saigon Heat | 74.4% |
| 3FG% | Hanoi Buffaloes | 30.0% |

== Awards ==
=== Yearly awards ===
- Moment of the Year: Phạm Quang Minh
- Handle of the Year: Christian Juzang (Saigon Heat)
- Assist of the Year: Sang Dinh (Hanoi Buffaloes)
- Buzzer Beater of the Year: Võ Huy Hoàn (Hochiminh City Wings)
- Block of the Year: Joshua Keyes (Saigon Heat)
- Dunk of the Year: Raheem Watts (Hochiminh City Wings)
- Favorite Player of the Year: Christian Juzang (Saigon Heat)
- Rookie of the Year: Lê Quang (Saigon Heat)
- Most Improved Player of the Year: Nguyễn Hoàng Tuấn (Danang Dragons)
- Sportsmanship of the Year: Mike Bell (Hanoi Buffaloes)
- Sixth Man of the Year: Nguyễn Tiến Dương (Hanoi Buffaloes)
- Defensive Player of the Year: Leon Hampton (Cantho Catfish)
- Local Player of the Year: Lê Ngọc Tú (Hochiminh City Wings)
- Heritage Player of the Year: Christian Juzang (Saigon Heat)
- Coach of the Year: Kevin Yurkus (Saigon Heat)
- Most Valuable Player of the Year: Robert Crawford (Thang Long Warriors)

=== MVP of the Week ===
| For week ending | Player | Team | Ref. |
|---|---|---|---|
| 28 October 2020 | Leon Hampton (1/1) | Cantho Catfish | 1 |
| 11 November 2020 | Joshua Keyes (1/1) | Saigon Heat | 2 |
| 18 November 2020 | Christian Juzang (1/1) | Saigon Heat | 3 |
