= 3x3 basketball at the 2016 Asian Beach Games =

- Venue: Biển Đông Park
- Dates: 26–29 September 2016

3x3 basketball competition at the 2016 Asian Beach Games was held in Da Nang, Vietnam from 26 to 29 September 2016 at Biển Đông Park.

== Medalists ==
Event	Gold	Silver	Bronze
Men	Qatar; Nedim Muslić; Tanguy Ngombo; Abdulrahman Saad; Erfan Ali Saeed	Mongolia; Gotovyn Tsengüünbayar; Olzvoin Nyambayar; Davaasambuugiin Delgernyam; Enkhtaivany Tserenbaatar	Iraq; Mustafa Jasim; Ali Muayad; Hassan Ali; Mohammed Salah
Women	China; Zhang Jiahe; Jin Weina; Dilana Dilixiati; Wang Siyu	Thailand; Penphan Yothanan; Thidaporn Maihom; Naruemol Banmoo; Pattrawadee Janthabut	Chinese Taipei; Huang Jou-chen; Lo Pin; Chen Wei-an; Tai I-ting

== Medal table ==
Rank	Nation	Gold	Silver	Bronze	Total
1	China (CHN)	1	0	0	1
1	Qatar (QAT)	1	0	0	1
3	Mongolia (MGL)	0	1	0	1
3	Thailand (THA)	0	1	0	1
5	Chinese Taipei (TPE)	0	0	1	1
5	Iraq (IRQ)	0	0	1	1
Totals (6 entries)		2	2	2	6

== Results ==
=== Men ===
==== Preliminary round ====
===== Group A =====
Pos	Team	Pld	W	L	PF	PA	PD	Pts
1	Mongolia	5	4	1	70	56	+14	9
2	Indonesia	5	3	2	63	50	+13	8
3	Iraq	5	3	2	62	59	+3	8
4	Turkmenistan	5	3	2	63	44	+19	8
5	Nepal	5	1	4	57	81	−24	6
6	Bangladesh	5	1	4	56	81	−25	6

Source: FIBA

26 September
15:40

Turkmenistan	19–4	Bangladesh
Pts: Otbozin 14		Pts: Biswas 2

Biển Đông Park, Da Nang
Referees: Glenn Cornelio (PHI)

26 September
16:20

Mongolia	13–11 (OT)	Iraq
Pts: Tsengüünbayar 8		Pts: Muayad 6

Biển Đông Park, Da Nang
Referees: Glenn Cornelio (PHI)

26 September
17:20

Indonesia	11–10	Turkmenistan
Pts: Wisnu 5		Pts: Paşkow, Otbozin 4

Biển Đông Park, Da Nang
Referees: Glenn Cornelio (PHI)

26 September
18:00

Nepal	10–18	Mongolia
Pts: Pradhan 5		Pts: Tserenbaatar 9

Biển Đông Park, Da Nang
Referees: Fatma Al-Harthi (OMA)

26 September
18:40

Mongolia	18–12	Bangladesh
Pts: Tsengüünbayar 9		Pts: Aziz 8

Biển Đông Park, Da Nang
Referees: Donald Francis Quinn (INA)

27 September
15:40

Iraq	15–13	Nepal
Pts: Ali 5		Pts: S. Shrestha 5

Biển Đông Park, Da Nang
Referees: Jontapa (THA), Kampoosiripan (THA)

27 September
16:20

Indonesia	10–11	Mongolia
Pts: Wisnu 4		Pts: Delgernyam, Tserenbaatar 4

Biển Đông Park, Da Nang
Referees: Cornelio (PHI), Jontapa (THA)

27 September
16:40

Nepal	18–17 (OT)	Bangladesh
Pts: Singh 7		Pts: Biswas 10

Biển Đông Park, Da Nang
Referees: Chu (MAS), Quinn (INA)

27 September
17:00

Iraq	10–13	Indonesia
Pts: Jasim 7		Pts: Indrawan, Wisnu 5

Biển Đông Park, Da Nang
Referees: Jontapa (THA), Al-Harthi (OMA)

27 September
17:20

Mongolia	10–13	Turkmenistan
Pts: Tsengüünbayar 4		Pts: Paşkow 6

Biển Đông Park, Da Nang
Referees: Cornelio (PHI), Kampoosiripan (THA)

27 September
17:40

Indonesia	19–7	Nepal
Pts: Wisnu 10		Pts: Pradhan 4

Biển Đông Park, Da Nang
Referees: Pomar (PHI), Jontapa (THA)

28 September
15:20

Turkmenistan	9–10	Iraq
Pts: Paşkow 5		Pts: Salah 4

Biển Đông Park, Da Nang
Referees: Cornelio (PHI), Kampoosiripan (THA)

28 September
15:40

Bangladesh	12–10	Indonesia
Pts: Aziz 6		Pts: Utomo, Indrawan, Wisnu 3

Biển Đông Park, Da Nang
Referees: Chu (MAS), Quinn (INA)

28 September
16:00

Nepal	9–12	Turkmenistan
Pts: S. Shrestha 6		Pts: Paşkow 4

Biển Đông Park, Da Nang
Referees: Jontapa (THA), Liu (MAS)

28 September
16:20

Bangladesh	11–16	Iraq
Pts: Biswas 5		Pts: Muayad 8

Biển Đông Park, Da Nang
Referees: Pomar (PHI), Leong (SGP)

===== Group B =====
Pos	Team	Pld	W	L	PF	PA	PD	Pts
1	Qatar	5	5	0	98	57	+41	10
2	China	5	4	1	87	56	+31	9
3	Thailand	5	3	2	81	55	+26	8
4	Vietnam	5	2	3	62	82	−20	7
5	Bhutan	5	1	4	58	94	−36	6
6	Laos	5	0	5	56	98	−42	5

Source: FIBA

26 September
15:40

Qatar	21–12	Laos
Pts: Ngombo, Saeed 7		Pts: Phongphoumy 7

Biển Đông Park, Da Nang
Referees: Donald Francis Quinn (INA)

26 September
16:40

Thailand	17–9	Vietnam
Pts: Klahan 6		Pts: Lê N. 5

Biển Đông Park, Da Nang
Referees: Donald Francis Quinn (INA)

26 September
16:40

Laos	16–19	Bhutan
Pts: Lothalath 9		Pts: Dorji 12

Biển Đông Park, Da Nang
Referees: Liu Chee Khun (MAS)

26 September
17:40

Qatar	17–16	China
Pts: Saad 7		Pts: Zhang 7

Biển Đông Park, Da Nang
Referees: Nattapong Jontapa (THA)

26 September
18:40

Vietnam	18–15	Bhutan
Pts: Triệu 12		Pts: Tshering, Dorji 6

Biển Đông Park, Da Nang
Referees: Glenn Cornelio (PHI)

27 September
15:40

Bhutan	7–18	Thailand
Pts: Chophel 3		Pts: Dasom 7

Biển Đông Park, Da Nang
Referees: Quinn (INA), Juma (QAT)

27 September
16:00

China	21–7	Laos
Pts: Teng 10		Pts: Sonenalad 5

Biển Đông Park, Da Nang
Referees: Cornelio (PHI), Leong (SGP)

27 September
16:40

Laos	8–22	Thailand
Pts: Lothalath 4		Pts: Ghogar 9

Biển Đông Park, Da Nang
Referees: Pomar (PHI), Juma (QAT)

27 September
17:00

Qatar	21–8	Vietnam
Pts: Ngombo 10		Pts: Lê N. 4

Biển Đông Park, Da Nang
Referees: Pomar (PHI), Liu (MAS)

28 September
15:00

Bhutan	9–21	Qatar
Pts: Chophel 4		Pts: Saeed 9

Biển Đông Park, Da Nang
Referees: Chu (MAS), Al-Harthi (OMA)

28 September
15:00

Thailand	12–13	China
Pts: Dasom 7		Pts: Zhang 7

Biển Đông Park, Da Nang
Referees: Pomar (PHI), Quinn (INA)

28 September
15:20

Vietnam	15–13	Laos
Pts: Lê N. 8		Pts: Lothalath 4

Biển Đông Park, Da Nang
Referees: Jontapa (THA), Liu (MAS)

28 September
15:40

China	21–8	Bhutan
Pts: Teng 9		Pts: Tshering 4

Biển Đông Park, Da Nang
Referees: Al-Harthi (OMA), Juma (QAT)

28 September
16:00

Qatar	18–12	Thailand
Pts: Saad 7		Pts: Klahan 6

Biển Đông Park, Da Nang
Referees: Cornelio (PHI), Leong (SGP)

28 September
16:20

Vietnam	12–16	China
Pts: Lê N. 4		Pts: Teng 9

Biển Đông Park, Da Nang
Referees: Kampoosiripan (THA), Juma (QAT)

==== Knockout round ====
Quarterfinals
29 September
Mongolia	14
Vietnam	11
29 September
China	10
Iraq (OT)	12
29 September
Indonesia	13
Thailand (OT)	15
29 September
Qatar	15
Turkmenistan	9

Semifinals
29 September
Mongolia	22
Iraq	7
29 September
Thailand	11
Qatar	21

Gold medal game
29 September
Mongolia	12
Qatar	15
Bronze medal game
29 September
Iraq	16
Thailand	15

===== Quarterfinals =====
29 September
15:20

Mongolia	14–11	Vietnam
Pts: Tsengüünbayar 6		Pts: Lê N. 5

Biển Đông Park, Da Nang
Referees: Cornelio (PHI), Jontapa (THA)

29 September
15:20

China	10–12 (OT)	Iraq
Pts: Teng 4		Pts: Salah 8

Biển Đông Park, Da Nang
Referees: Pomar (PHI), Juma (QAT)

29 September
16:00

Indonesia	13–15 (OT)	Thailand
Pts: Wisnu 6		Pts: Dasom 8

Biển Đông Park, Da Nang
Referees: Cornelio (PHI), Leong (SGP)

29 September
16:00

Qatar	15–9	Turkmenistan
Pts: Saad 6		Pts: Otbozin 4

Biển Đông Park, Da Nang
Referees: Quinn (INA), Jontapa (THA)

===== Semifinals =====
29 September
16:40

Mongolia	22–7	Iraq
Pts: Tsengüünbayar 11		Pts: Salah 4

Biển Đông Park, Da Nang
Referees: Kampoosiripan (THA), Juma (QAT)

29 September
16:40

Thailand	11–21	Qatar
Pts: Dasom 5		Pts: Ngombo, Saad 7

Biển Đông Park, Da Nang
Referees: Chu (MAS), Cornelio (PHI)

===== Bronze medal game =====
29 September
17:00

Iraq	16–15	Thailand
Pts: Ali 7		Pts: Klahan 8

Biển Đông Park, Da Nang
Referees: Kampoosiripan (THA), Juma (QAT)

===== Gold medal game =====
29 September
17:40

Mongolia	12–15	Qatar
Pts: Tsengüünbayar 8		Pts: Saad 6

Biển Đông Park, Da Nang
Referees: Quinn (INA), Cornelio (PHI)

=== Women ===
==== Preliminary round ====
===== Group A =====
Pos	Team	Pld	W	L	PF	PA	PD	Pts
1	China	4	4	0	84	24	+60	8
2	Turkmenistan	4	3	1	54	40	+14	7
3	Philippines	4	2	2	50	59	−9	6
4	Mongolia	4	1	3	42	55	−13	5
5	Laos	4	0	4	24	76	−52	4

Source: FIBA

26 September
15:00

Philippines	17–12	Laos
Pts: Borja 9		Pts: Khammany 7

Biển Đông Park, Da Nang
Referees: Fatma Al-Harthi (OMA)

26 September
15:20

Turkmenistan	14–5	Mongolia
Pts: Gokowa 7		Pts: Ganzul, Maijargal 2

Biển Đông Park, Da Nang
Referees: Abdulrahman Juma (QAT)

26 September
17:00

Laos	6–21	Turkmenistan
Pts: Khammany 4		Pts: Gokowa 13

Biển Đông Park, Da Nang
Referees: Nattapong Jontapa (THA)

26 September
17:20

China	21–9	Philippines
Pts: Dilana 10		Pts: Borja 4

Biển Đông Park, Da Nang
Referees: Leong Chuen Wing (SGP)

26 September
18:20

China	21–9	Mongolia
Pts: Dilana 10		Pts: Ganzul 6

Biển Đông Park, Da Nang
Referees: Nattapong Jontapa (THA)

27 September
15:00

Turkmenistan	4–21	China
Pts: Nagiýewa 3		Pts: Dilana 9

Biển Đông Park, Da Nang
Referees: Chu (MAS), Pomar (PHI)

27 September
15:00

Mongolia	17–4	Laos
Pts: Solongo 8		Pts: Thammavong, Khammany 2

Biển Đông Park, Da Nang
Referees: Leong (SGP), Juma (QAT)

27 September
16:00

Philippines	8–15	Turkmenistan
Pts: Mercado 4		Pts: Gokowa 12

Biển Đông Park, Da Nang
Referees: Chu (MAS), Al-Harthi (OMA)

27 September
16:20

Laos	2–21	China
Pts: Khammany 2		Pts: Jin 7

Biển Đông Park, Da Nang
Referees: Kampoosiripan (THA), Liu (MAS)

27 September
17:20

Mongolia	11–16	Philippines
Pts: Bayanjargal, Maijargal 5		Pts: Borja 8

Biển Đông Park, Da Nang
Referees: Quinn (INA), Leong (SGP)

===== Group B =====
Pos	Team	Pld	W	L	PF	PA	PD	Pts
1	Thailand	3	2	1	54	26	+28	5
2	Chinese Taipei	3	2	1	52	35	+17	5
3	Vietnam	3	2	1	45	45	0	5
4	Bhutan	3	0	3	14	59	−45	3

Source: FIBA

26 September
15:00

Chinese Taipei	20–3	Bhutan
Pts: Chen 10		Pts: S. Wangmo 2

Biển Đông Park, Da Nang
Referees: Nattapong Jontapa (THA)

26 September
15:20

Vietnam	7–21	Thailand
Pts: Huỳnh 3		Pts: Yothanan 9

Biển Đông Park, Da Nang
Referees: Donald Francis Quinn (INA)

26 September
17:00

Chinese Taipei	18–20	Vietnam
Pts: Chen 9		Pts: Huỳnh 8

Biển Đông Park, Da Nang
Referees: Liu Chee Khun (MAS)

26 September
17:40

Bhutan	5–21	Thailand
Pts: S. Wangmo, Kumutha 2		Pts: Maihom 16

Biển Đông Park, Da Nang
Referees: Dominique Pomar (PHI)

27 September
15:20

Thailand	12–14 (OT)	Chinese Taipei
Pts: Banmoo 7		Pts: Chen 7

Biển Đông Park, Da Nang
Referees: Quinn (INA), Liu (MAS)

27 September
15:20

Vietnam	18–6	Bhutan
Pts: Huỳnh, Nguyễn 7		Pts: S. Wangmo, D. Wangmo 2

Biển Đông Park, Da Nang
Referees: Cornelio (PHI), Al-Harthi (OMA)

==== Knockout round ====
Quarterfinals
29 September
China	21
Bhutan	1
29 September
Chinese Taipei	21
Philippines	6
29 September
Turkmenistan	12
Vietnam	10
29 September
Thailand	15
Mongolia	8

Semifinals
29 September
China	21
Chinese Taipei	12
29 September
Turkmenistan	5
Thailand	10

Gold medal game
29 September
China	15
Thailand	9
Bronze medal game
29 September
Chinese Taipei	21
Turkmenistan	9

===== Quarterfinals =====
29 September
15:00

China	21–1	Bhutan
Pts: Dilana 9		Pts: Bidha 1

Biển Đông Park, Da Nang
Referees: Kampoosiripan (THA), Al-Harthi (OMA)

29 September
15:00

Chinese Taipei	21–6	Philippines
Pts: Lo 9		Pts: Borja, Escoto, Mercado 2

Biển Đông Park, Da Nang
Referees: Quinn (INA), Liu (MAS)

29 September
15:40

Turkmenistan	12–10	Vietnam
Pts: Gokowa 8		Pts: Huỳnh, Trát 4

Biển Đông Park, Da Nang
Referees: Chu (MAS), Leong (SGP)

29 September
15:40

Thailand	15–8	Mongolia
Pts: Banmoo 6		Pts: Bayanjargal 4

Biển Đông Park, Da Nang
Referees: Al-Harthi (OMA), Liu (MAS)

===== Semifinals =====
29 September
16:20

China	21–12	Chinese Taipei
Pts: Zhang, Dilana 8		Pts: Lo 7

Biển Đông Park, Da Nang
Referees: Pomar (PHI), Kampoosiripan (THA)

29 September
16:20

Turkmenistan	5–10	Thailand
Pts: Gokowa 3		Pts: Maihom, Banmoo 4

Biển Đông Park, Da Nang
Referees: Chu (MAS), Quinn (INA)

===== Bronze medal game =====
29 September
17:00

Chinese Taipei	21–9	Turkmenistan
Pts: Chen 8		Pts: Gokowa 5

Biển Đông Park, Da Nang
Referees: Pomar (PHI), Leong (SGP)

===== Gold medal game =====
29 September
17:20

China	15–9	Thailand
Pts: Jin 6		Pts: Maihom 4

Biển Đông Park, Da Nang
Referees: Al-Harthi (OMA), Liu (MAS)
