= 2021 VBA season =

Sixth season of the Vietnam Basketball Association

Vietnam Basketball Association
- Season: 2021
- Duration: 10 July 2021 – 27 August 2021 (Regular season)
- Games played: 38
- Teams: 8
- TV partners: Vietnam: On Sports; Online: YouTube

Statistical leaders
Points	(United States) DeQuan Bracey (Heat)	36.3
Rebounds	(United States) Mike Bell (Buffaloes)	20.0
Assists	(United States) DeQuan Bracey (Heat)	8.2

The 2021 VBA season was the sixth season of the Vietnam Basketball Association. The regular season began on 10 July but was canceled on 27 August due to a new surge of the COVID-19 pandemic in Vietnam.

The season was scheduled to start on 4 June, with the regular season and postseason set to be played in bubbles in Hanoi and Ho Chi Minh City. However, the start was postponed due to a surge of the Delta variant of COVID-19.

== Teams ==
All seven teams from the 2020 season returned. The Vietnam national team was added as the eighth team to help prepare for the 2021 SEA Games.

=== Venues and locations ===
Due to the COVID-19 pandemic, all games were played in a bubble in Nha Trang on the campus of Nha Trang University.

=== Personnel and sponsorship ===
Team	Head coach	Captain	Kit manufacturer
Cantho Catfish	(United States) Martin Knezevic		Actee
Danang Dragons	(Vietnam) Phan Thanh Cảnh		Actee
Hanoi Buffaloes	(Mexico) Eric Weissling		Actee
Hochiminh City Wings	(Sweden) Erik Olson		Actee
Nha Trang Dolphins	(United States) Robert Newson		Actee
Saigon Heat	(United States) Matt Van Pelt		Hemero
Thang Long Warriors	(Serbia) Predrag Lukic		Actee
Vietnam NT	(United States) Kevin Yurkus		Hemero

== Regular season ==
=== Standings ===
Pos	Team	Pld	W	L	PF	PA	PD	PCT	GB	Qualification	SGH	TLW	DND	HCM	VIE	HNB	CTC	NTD
1	Saigon Heat	9	8	1	847	749	+98	.889	—	Advance to Semifinals	—	81-94			81-66	93-90	99-63; 104-82	
2	Thang Long Warriors	10	8	2	873	789	+84	.800	0.5	Advance to Semifinals		—		88-96	84-73	74-67		88-77; 94-67
3	Danang Dragons	9	6	3	781	745	+36	.667	2	Advance to Playoffs	93-103	88-89	—		74-83; 73-72		90-87	
4	Hochiminh City Wings	10	6	4	818	794	+24	.600	2.5	Advance to Playoffs	85-91		68-80	—		91-69; 67-71; 94-89	88-87	
5	Vietnam NT	9	4	5	665	703	−38	.444	4	Advance to Playoffs			71-97	82-51	—			92-80
6	Hanoi Buffaloes	10	4	6	853	801	+52	.400	4.5	Advance to Playoffs			91-97	72-76	96-54	—		110-71
7	Cantho Catfish	9	2	7	730	805	−75	.222	6			95-90 (OT); 74-92			67-72	84-98	—	
8	Nha Trang Dolphins	10	0	10	760	941	−181	.000	8.5		80-90; 96-105	71-80	81-89	65-102			72-91	—

Updated to match(es) played on 27 August 2021. Source: vba.vn

== Statistics ==
=== Individual statistic leaders ===
Category	Player	Team	Statistic
Points per game	DaQuan Bracey	Saigon Heat	36.3
Rebounds per game	Mike Bell	Hanoi Buffaloes	20.0
Assists per game	DaQuan Bracey	Saigon Heat	8.2
Steals per game	Akeem Scott	Danang Dragons	3.6
Blocks per game	Mike Bell	Hanoi Buffaloes	3.0

=== Team statistic leaders ===
Category	Team	Statistic
Points per game	Saigon Heat	95.1
Rebounds per game	Saigon Heat	64.6
Assists per game	Hanoi Buffaloes	19.5
Steals per game	Hanoi Buffaloes	10.0
Blocks per game	Hanoi Buffaloes	3.9
FG%	Hanoi Buffaloes	45.2%
FT%	Hochiminh City Wings	72.2%
