= Nguyễn Văn Hùng (martial artist) =

Vietnamese Taekwondo practitioner

No. 10 – Thang Long Warriors
- Position: Center
- League: VBA

Personal information
- Born: May 5, 1980 (age 45); Thanh Hóa, Vietnam
- Listed height: 6 ft 4 in (1.93 m)
- Listed weight: 199 lb (90 kg)

Career information
- Playing career: 2016–present

Career history
- 2016: Saigon Heat (VBA)
- 2017: Saigon Heat (ABL)
- 2017: Thang Long Warriors
- 2019: Danang Dragons
- 2020–present: Thang Long Warriors

Medal record

Men's taekwondo

Representing Vietnam

Asian Games
Silver medal – second place	2002 Busan	Heavyweight

Asian Championships
Gold medal – first place	2004 Seongnam	Heavyweight
Silver medal – second place	2008 Luoyang	Heavyweight
Silver medal – second place	2000 Hong Kong	Heavyweight
Bronze medal – third place	2006 Bangkok	Heavyweight

Nguyễn Văn Hùng (born 5 May 1980) is a Vietnamese martial artist, and professional basketball player for the Thang Long Warriors of the Vietnam Basketball Association (VBA) and the Saigon Heat of the ASEAN Basketball League (ABL). He is a three-time gold medalist in Taekwondo at the Southeast Asian Games. He also represented his country at the 2008 Beijing Olympics in taekwondo. For his accomplishments in sport, his government granted him the Honourable First Class Labour Order in January 2006.

Văn Hùng was a member of the Vietnam national basketball team that competed in the 2017 SEABA Championship.
