= David Arnold (basketball) =

Vietnamese-American basketball player (born 1990)

No. 33 – Saigon Heat
- Position: Shooting guard
- League: ABL / VBA

Personal information
- Born: November 10, 1990 (age 36) Highlands Ranch, Colorado
- Listed height: 6 ft 2 in (1.88 m)
- Listed weight: 181 lb (82 kg)

Career information
- High school: ThunderRidge (Highlands Ranch, Colorado)
- College: Northern Colorado (2009–2011); Montana State Billings (2011–2013)
- NBA draft: 2013: undrafted
- Playing career: 2013–2018

Career history
- 2014–2018: Saigon Heat
- 2016–2018: →Saigon Heat (VBA)

Career highlights
- All-VBA First Team (2016)

David Harrison Arnold (also known as Việt Arnold; born November 10, 1990) is a Vietnamese-American professional basketball player for the Saigon Heat of the ASEAN Basketball League. He played college basketball for the Northern Colorado Bears and the Montana State Billings Yellowjackets. He is also referred to as "Việt Arnold" in Vietnam.

Arnold shared in an ABL interview that he grew up a Celtic fan, watching Larry Bird, and is also a fan of Lebron James and Rajon Rondo.

== Early life ==
David Harrison Arnold was born on 10 November 1990 to Daron John Arnold and Mai Sheridan Arnold, in Santa Monica, California while his father attended UCLA Law School, then moved to Denver, Colorado when he was about 8 years old. His father is American and his mother is Vietnamese-American, born in Hanoi but immigrated when she was 8. Mai herself is a half-Vietnamese. David Arnold has an older brother, Sean Michael Arnold, and two younger brothers, Ryan John Arnold and Garrett Lawrence Arnold, who all graduated from ThunderRidge High School in Highlands Ranch, Colorado.

Although he initially played American football, David Arnold shares the passion for basketball with his brothers who all played for ThunderRidge Varsity Basketball team, giving credits to his father for introducing him to the game. Arnold continued his basketball career in college, playing as a guard. He spent two years at NCCA Division I Northern Colorado before transferring to Montana State University Billings in 2011 for another two years.

== Pro career ==
=== Saigon Heat ABL (2014–2018) ===
In 2014, Arnold made headlines by reconnecting with his Vietnamese heritage through professional basketball, thanks once again to Daron Arnold’s efforts. He joined the Saigon Heat of the ASEAN Basketball League prior to the 2014 season as a 'heritage' player and quickly became the face of the team.

=== Saigon Heat VBA (2016–2018) ===
With the formation for the Vietnam Basketball Association, Arnold joined the Saigon Heat side for the league's inaugural season. At the conclusion of the season, he was named to the All-VBA First Team, finishing with averages of 17.2 points, 3.0 rebounds, and 5.9 assists per game.

Soon after, Ryan Arnold joined his brother in the VBA in 2016. He was recruited by Hanoi Buffaloes, which set the stage for a highly anticipated face-off between the siblings. The Arnolds made one of the most iconic brother duos in the league. However, Ryan suddenly announced his retirement from VBA at the end of his second season due to personal matters.

In early 2018, Arnold became a resident of Vietnam, qualifying him as a local player, but he soon retired from both the Saigon Heat and the VBA in at the end of that season.

== Coaching career ==
As of 2022, Arnold is known to have joined the coaching staff of his boyhood team, the ThunderRidge Grizzlies, as varsity assistant.

== Career statistics ==
Legend
GP	Games played	GS	Games started	MPG	Minutes per game
FG%	Field goal percentage	3P%	3-point field goal percentage	FT%	Free throw percentage
RPG	Rebounds per game	APG	Assists per game	SPG	Steals per game
BPG	Blocks per game	PPG	Points per game	**Bold**	Career high

=== ABL ===
Year	Team	GP	RPG	APG	FG%	FT%	PPG
2014	Saigon	19	3.8	2.6	.419	.684	14.2
Career		19	3.8	2.6	.419	.684	14.2

=== VBA ===
Year	Team	GP	GS	MPG	FG%	3P%	FT%	RPG	APG	SPG	BPG	PPG
2016	Saigon	15	13	**34.1**	**.420**	.380	.700	3.0	**5.9**	.9	**.3**	**17.2**
2017	Saigon	**17**	**16**	28.4	.400	**.390**	**.750**	**4.8**	5.5	**1.4**	.2	14.4
Career		32	29	31.3	.410	.390	.720	3.9	5.7	1.2	.2	15.7

== Awards and honors ==
=== VBA ===
- All-VBA First Team: 2016
