= Triệu Hán Minh =

Vietnamese basketball player

No. 98 – Saigon Heat
- Position: Shooting guard
- League: VBA

Personal information
- Born: June 9, 1987 (age 37); Ho Chi Minh City, Vietnam
- Listed height: 5 ft 10 in (1.78 m)
- Listed weight: 161 lb (73 kg)

Career information
- Playing career: 2012–present

Career history
- 2012: Saigon Heat (ABL)
- 2016–2017: Hochiminh City Wings
- 2018–present: Saigon Heat (VBA)

Triệu Hán Minh (born June 9, 1987) is a Vietnamese professional basketball player who currently plays for the Saigon Heat of the Vietnam Basketball Association (VBA).

== Pro career ==
=== Saigon Heat (ABL) ===
In 2012, Hán Minh joined the Heat before the club's inaugural season in the ABL.

=== Hochiminh City Wings (2016–2017) ===
Hán Minh joined the Hochiminh City Wings for the VBA's inaugural season. He finished with averages of 10.9 points, 3.1 rebounds, and 2.5 assists per game.

== Career statistics ==
Legend
GP	Games played	GS	Games started	MPG	Minutes per game
FG%	Field goal percentage	3P%	3-point field goal percentage	FT%	Free throw percentage
RPG	Rebounds per game	APG	Assists per game	SPG	Steals per game
BPG	Blocks per game	PPG	Points per game	**Bold**	Career high

=== VBA ===
Year	Team	GP	GS	MPG	FG%	3P%	FT%	RPG	APG	SPG	BPG	PPG
2016	Hochiminh City	14	3	26.3	.370	.320	.790	3.1	**2.5**	1	.0	10.9
2017	Hochiminh City	15	13	29	.350	.260	**.800**	**4.3**	2.5	**1.3**	**.1**	10
2018	Saigon Heat	**17**	**16**	**32.4**	**.440**	**.430**	.770	3.8	2.3	.9	.0	**13**
Career		46	32	29.2	.390	.340	.790	3.7	2.4	1.	.0	11.3
