= Donte Hill =

American basketball coach

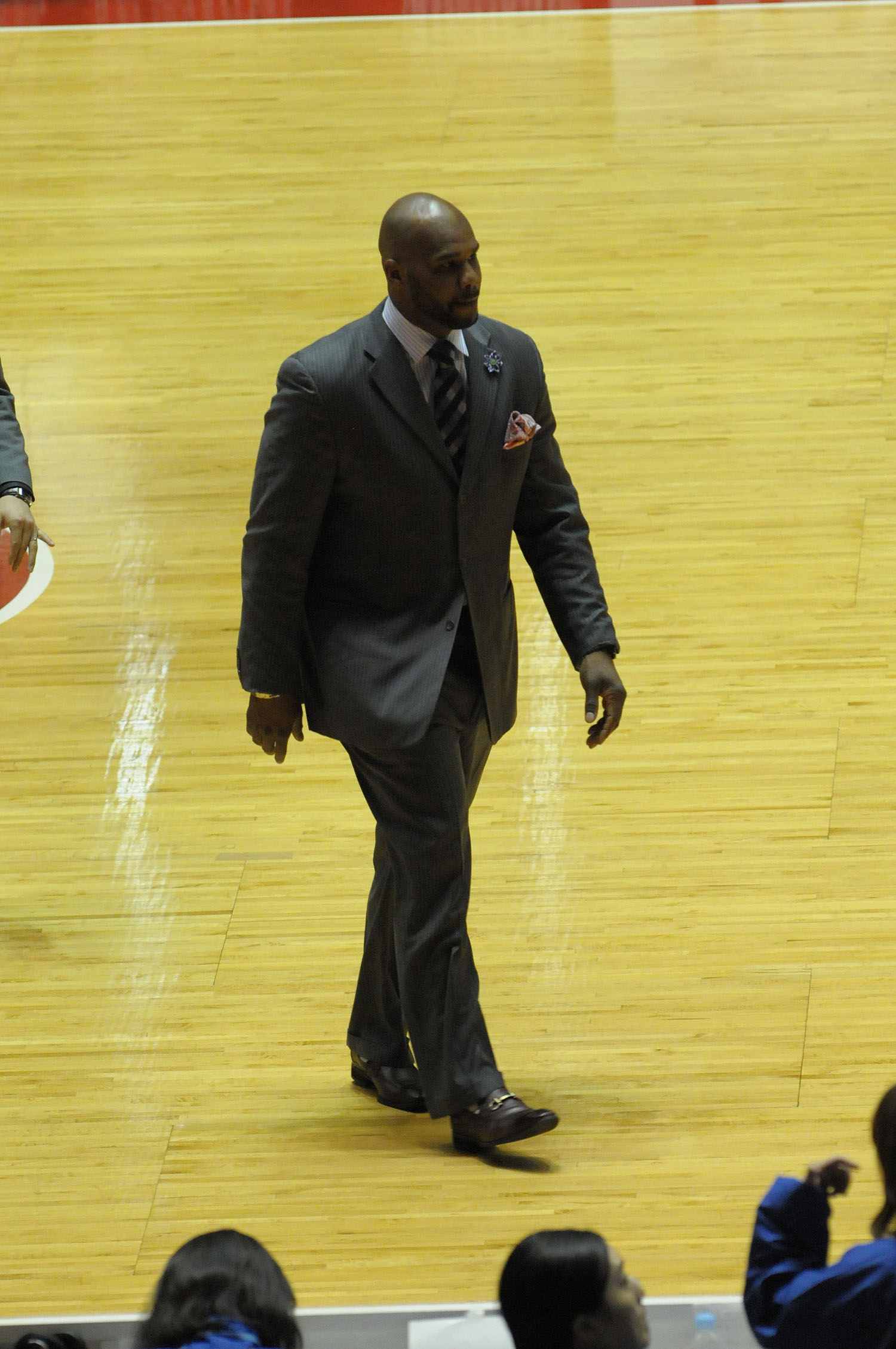

Personal information
- Born: October 4, 1978 (age 48)

Career information
- College: Ferris State (1997–2001)
- Position: Head coach

Career history

Coaching
- xxxx: Gainesville Galaxy
- 2013–2015: Tsukuba Robots
- 2016–2017: Danang Dragons
- 2017: Vietnam
- 2018: Iwate Big Bulls

Career highlights
- VBA Champion (2016)

Donte' Hill (born October 4, 1978) is an American basketball head coach who last coached for the Iwate Big Bulls of the Japanese B.League.

== Head coaching record ==
Legend
Regular season	G	Games coached	W	Games won	L	Games lost	W–L %	Win–loss %
Playoffs	PG	Playoff games	PW	Playoff wins	PL	Playoff losses	PW–L %	Playoff win–loss %

Team	Year	G	W	L	W–L%	Finish	PG	PW	PL	PW–L%	Result
Tsukuba Robots	2013–14	54	10	44	.185	4th in NBL Western	-	-	-	–	-
Tsukuba Robots	2014	16	0	16	.000	Fired	-	-	-	–	-
Danang Dragons	2016	16	4	12	.250	5th	5	5	0	1.000	League Champions
Danang Dragons	2017	15	2	13	.133	6th	-	-	-	–	Did not qualify
Iwate Big Bulls	2018	32	5	27	.156	6th in B2 Eastern	-	-	-	–	Relegated to B3
