= Rudolphe Joly =

Haitian-Canadian basketball player

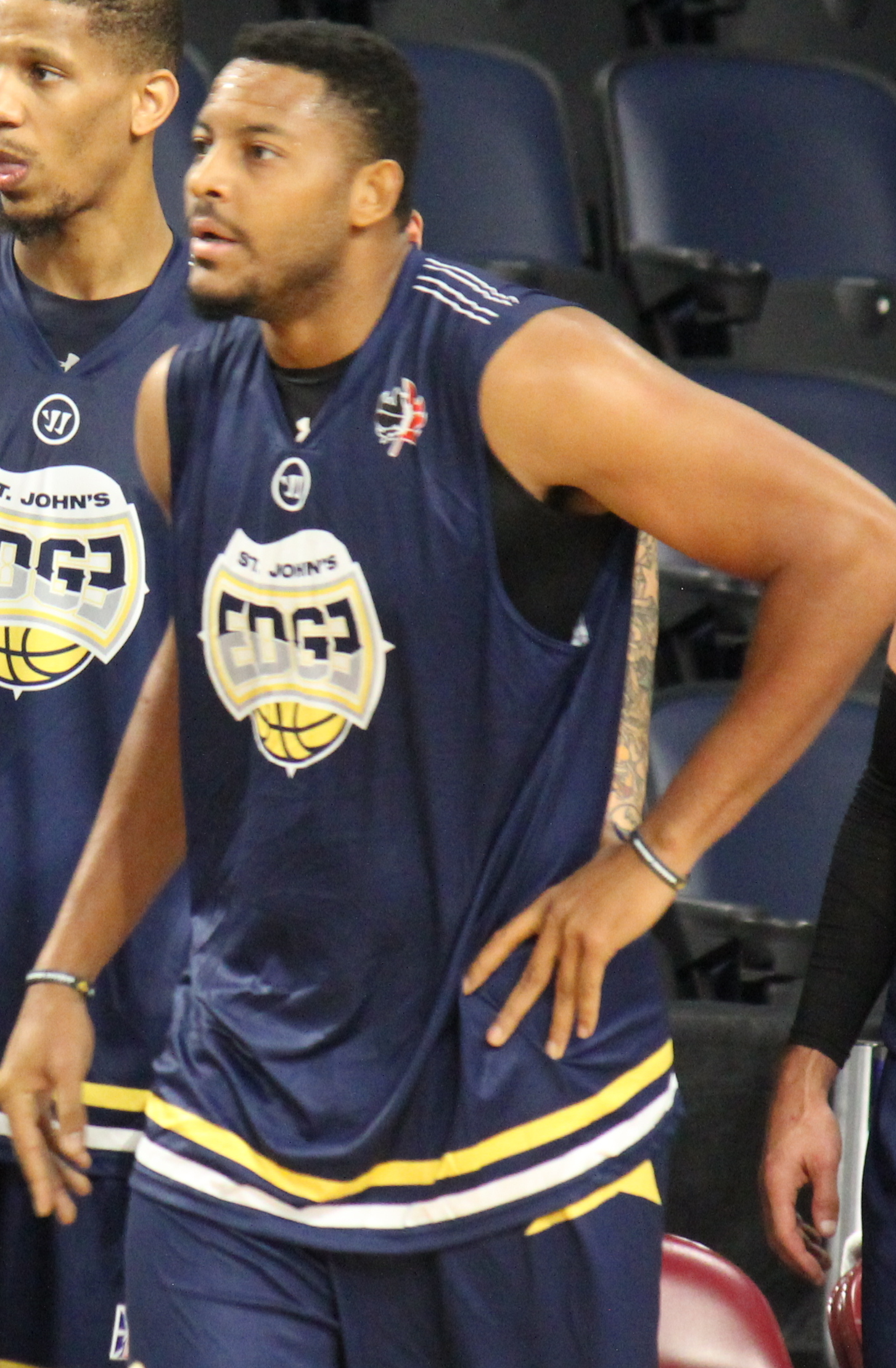
- Joly with the St. John's Edge in 2017

Personal information
- Born: September 11, 1992 (age 34) Haiti
- Listed height: 6 ft 10 in (2.08 m)
- Listed weight: 280 lb (127 kg)

Career information
- High school: Collège d'Alma (Alma, Quebec)
- College: Sheridan College (2013–2015); UQAM (2015–2016)
- NBA draft: 2016: undrafted
- Playing career: 2016–present
- Position: Center

Career history
- 2016: Windsor Express
- 2016: Danang Dragons
- 2017: Windsor Express
- 2017: St. John's Edge
- 2018: T-Rex
- 2018: Nakhon Pathom Mad Goat
- 2018: Rustavi
- 2018–2019: London Lightning
- 2019: Llaneros Gaiteros

Career highlights
- VBA International MVP (2016); VBA champion (2016); VBA scoring champion (2016)

Rudolphe "Rudy" Joly (born September 11, 1992) is a Haitian-Canadian professional basketball player. A Haiti native, he moved to Quebec City for school. Joly has competed at the college level in both the United States and Canada, with Sheridan College and Université du Québec à Montréal (UQAM). As a professional, he has played in both the NBL Canada and Vietnam Basketball Association (VBA), most notably winning the 2016 VBA championship and earning international MVP honors.

== Early life ==
Joly was born in Haiti, where he played basketball with current National Basketball Association (NBA) player Skal Labissière. He drew interest from schools in the United States for his basketball skills, but his family made him stay in Haiti, as they did not have any relatives in the country. At age 17, he moved to Quebec City with his mother and brother to go to school.

Joly attended College d'Alma in Alma, Quebec and was known as one of the best high school players in Canada. In his final year on the basketball team, he averaged eight points and 11 rebounds per game with a 60% field goal percentage. He guided the team to a 48–5 record and a win at the NSPAA & Canada Prep Championship. Joly, additionally, competed at the All-Canada Classic, featuring the top 24 players in the country.

== College career ==
In 2013, Joly began playing college basketball for Sheridan College, a junior college in Sheridan, Wyoming. Head coach, Steve Smiley, praised him: "One of the most common sayings in basketball is 'you can't teach size' and Rudolphe not only has unique size, but also good strength & mobility in the post." On November 6, 2013, Joly posted two points and a team-high 10 rebounds in 10 minutes to help defeat Rocky Mountain College.

Joly remained with Sheridan for his sophomore season as well. On November 29, 2014, he recorded a double-double of 11 points and 10 rebounds in a 110–68 win over Dakota College. He had another notable performance on February 13, 2015, with 12 points and 16 rebounds against Miles Community College, although his team lost in overtime.

In June 2015, it was announced that Joly would transfer to Université du Québec à Montréal (UQAM) for the 2015–16 season. In October, he won a gold medal with UQAM at a three-on-three basketball tournament held by the International University Sports Federation (FISU) in Xiamen, China and was voted most valuable player. In the following month, Joly was chosen to join UQAM at a FIBA 3x3 All-Stars competition in Doha, Qatar.

== Professional career ==
As a rookie, Joly played for the Windsor Express of the National Basketball League of Canada (NBLC) as the 2015–16 season came to a close. In his debut, he notched 10 points and nine rebounds in 22 minutes. After 14 games, Joly averaged 4.1 points, 3.7 rebounds, and 0.6 assists in 10.3 minutes per game.

Prior to the 2016–17 season, Joly was named to Windsor's protected list so that they retained his rights. In the summer of 2016, he signed a contract with the Danang Dragons of the Vietnam Basketball Association (VBA). On August 27, he led the Dragons to a win over the Cantho Catfish with 32 points, nine rebounds, and two assists, earning him game MVP honors. He helped the team win the VBA championship against Hochiminh City Wings, scoring a team-high 26 points in the final game. Joly was additionally named international MVP after averaging a team-best 24.2 points per game.

On March 7, 2017, Joly returned to the Windsor Express. Joining the team towards the end of the season, he was given limited playing time, averaging 2.1 points, 1.6 rebounds, and 0.1 assists per game in 4.2 minutes per game.

On October 24, 2017, Joly signed with the St. John's Edge, an expansion team in the NBL Canada.

In July 2019, Joly signed with Icelandic 1. deild karla club Ungmennafélagið Sindri. He was however no longer with the team when the regular season started.
