= Lê Ngọc Tú =

Vietnamese basketball player

No. 14 – Hochiminh City Wings
- Position: Shooting guard / small forward
- League: VBA

Personal information
- Born: October 9, 1990 (age 36) Ho Chi Minh City, Vietnam
- Listed height: 6 ft 0 in (1.83 m)
- Listed weight: 166 lb (75 kg)

Career information
- Playing career: 2016–present

Career history
- 2016: Hochiminh City Wings
- 2017–2018: Saigon Heat
- 2018–2019: Hanoi Buffaloes
- 2020–present: Hochiminh City Wings

Career highlights
- VBA Local Most Valuable Player (2016); All-VBA First Team (2016)

Lê Ngọc Tú (born October 9, 1990) is a Vietnamese professional basketball player who currently plays for the Hochiminh City Wings of the Vietnam Basketball Association (VBA).

== Pro career ==
=== Hochiminh City Wings (2016) ===
Ngọc Tú joined the Hochiminh City Wings for the VBA's inaugural season. At the conclusion of the season, he was named the VBA'S Local Most Valuable Player and to the All-VBA First Team, finishing with averages of 11.6 points, 3.7 rebounds, and 2.3 assists per game.

=== Saigon Heat (2017-2018) ===
Ngọc Tú began his tenure with the Saigon Heat after he was picked up from the City Wings in the offseason for the 2017 VBA season. There, he became one of the league's most improved players, raising his output from the previous season to 13.5 points, 5.3 rebounds, and 2.8 assists, while shooting 35 percent from beyond the arc.

=== Hanoi Buffaloes (2018-present) ===
Prior to the start of the 2018 season, Lê Ngọc Tú decided not to re-sign with the Saigon Heat. Instead, he took his chances elsewhere in the 2018 VBA draft. On 22 March, he was drafted by the Saigon Heat with the 11th overall pick in the 2018 draft only to be traded to Hanoi Buffaloes for the 9th pick (Huỳnh Khang) and 15th pick (Huỳnh Thanh Tâm).

== International career ==
Ngọc Tú made his debut for the Vietnam national team at the 2017 SEABA Championship in Quezon City. He finished the tournament averaging 7.7 points, 3.5 rebounds, and 2.3 assists per game.

He received his second call-up for the 2017 SEA Games in Kuala Lumpur.

== Career statistics ==
Legend
GP	Games played	GS	Games started	MPG	Minutes per game
FG%	Field goal percentage	3P%	3-point field goal percentage	FT%	Free throw percentage
RPG	Rebounds per game	APG	Assists per game	SPG	Steals per game
BPG	Blocks per game	PPG	Points per game	**Bold**	Career high

=== VBA ===
Year	Team	GP	GS	MPG	FG%	3P%	FT%	RPG	APG	SPG	BPG	PPG
2016	Hochiminh City	**21**	16	25.2	.440	.310	.520	3.7	2.3	1.2	.3	11.6
2017	Saigon Heat	17	17	**32.1**	**.480**	**.350**	.770	5.3	**2.8**	1.4	.1	13.5
2018	Hanoi Buffaloes	20	**20**	29	.430	.260	**.790**	4.4	1.3	**2**	**.4**	**13.6**
2019	Hanoi Buffaloes	15	15	27.4	.370	.230	.670	**6.1**	1.6	1.9	.1	11.8
Career		73	68	28.4	.430	.290	.690	4.8	2	1.6	.2	12.6

== Awards and honors ==
=== VBA ===
- VBA Local Most Valuable Player: 2016
- All-VBA First Team: 2016
