= 2016 VBA season =

Vietnam Basketball Association
- Season: 2016
- Duration: August 6, 2016 – October 23, 2016 (Regular season); October 26, 2016 – November 6, 2016 (Playoffs); November 11, 2016 – November 16, 2016 (Finals)
- Games played: 16
- Teams: 5

Regular season
- Top seed: Saigon Heat

Finals
- Champions: Danang Dragons (1st title)
- Runners-up: Hochiminh City Wings
- Semi-finalists: Hanoi Buffaloes; Saigon Heat

Awards
- Domestic MVP: (Vietnam) Lê Ngọc Tú
- International MVP: (Canada) Rudolphe Joly

Statistical leaders
Points	(Canada) Rudolphe Joly	24.2
Rebounds	(United States) Tavarion Nix	15.8
Assists	(United States) David Arnold	5.9

The 2016 VBA season is the inaugural season of the Vietnam Basketball Association. The regular season began on August 6, 2016, and ended on October 23, 2016. The playoffs began on October 26, 2016, and ended with the 2016 VBA Finals on November 16, 2016, with the Danang Dragons winning the inaugural VBA title after sweeping the Hochiminh City Wings in 2 games.

== Teams ==
=== Venues and locations ===
Locations of teams in 2017 VBA

Team	Home city	Arena	Capacity
Cantho Catfish	Cần Thơ	Da Nang Sports Arena	
Danang Dragons	Đà Nẵng	Quan Khu 5 Sports Arena	
Hanoi Buffaloes	Hà Nội	Bach Khoa Sports Arena	
Hochiminh City Wings	Ho Chi Minh City	Ho Xuan Huong Sports Arena	
Saigon Heat	Ho Chi Minh City	CIS Sports Arena	

=== Personnel and sponsorship ===
Team	Head coach	Captain	Kit manufacturer
Cantho Catfish	(United States) David Singleton	(United States) Tam Dinh	Hemero
Danang Dragons	(United States) Donte' Hill	(Sweden) Stefan Nguyen	Hemero
Hanoi Buffaloes	(United States) Todd Purves	(Vietnam) Nguyễn Thành Đạt	Hemero
Hochiminh City Wings	(Finland) Mika Turunen	(Vietnam) Triệu Hán Minh	Hemero
Saigon Heat	(United Kingdom) Tony Garbelotto	(United States) David Arnold	Hemero

== Import players ==
Each team is allowed 2 heritage players and 1 foreign player.

Team	Heritage 1	Heritage 2	Foreign
Cantho Catfish	(United States) Tam Dinh	(United States) Sang Dinh	(United States) Tavarion Nix
Danang Dragons	(United States) Horace Nguyen	(Australia) Jimmy Kien	(Canada) Rudolphe Joly
Hanoi Buffaloes	(United States) Anthony Phan	(United States) Ryan Arnold	(United States) Trevor Berkeley
Hochiminh City Wings	(United States) Justin Young	-	(United States) Jaywuan Hill
Saigon Heat	(United States) David Arnold	(United States) Khoa Tran	(United States) Darrell Miller

== Regular season ==
The regular season began on August 6 with the Hanoi Buffaloes hosting the Saigon Heat, and ended on October 23 with the Heat hosting the Buffaloes.

=== Standings ===
Pos	Team	Pld	W	L	PF	PA	PD	PCT	GB
1	Saigon Heat	16	11	5	0	0	0	.688	—
2	Hochiminh City Wings	16	11	5	0	0	0	.688	—
3	Hanoi Buffaloes	16	9	7	0	0	0	.563	2
4	Cantho Catfish	16	5	11	0	0	0	.313	6
5	Danang Dragons	16	4	12	0	0	0	.250	7

Source: vba.vn

==== Tiebreakers ====
The Heat clinched #1 seed over the Wings based on head-to-head record (3–1).

== Playoffs ==
The 2016 VBA playoffs began on October 26, 2016, and ended on November 12, 2016.

=== Bracket ===
Wildcard
4 Cantho Catfish	66
5 Danang Dragons	72

Semifinals
1 Saigon Heat	73	80
5 Danang Dragons	76	86
2 Hochiminh City Wings	64	77	74
3 Hanoi Buffaloes	84	66	71

Finals
5 Danang Dragons	69	85
2 Hochiminh City Wings	55	78

== Statistics ==
=== Individual statistic leaders ===
Category	Player	Team	Statistic
Points per game	Rudolphe Joly	Danang Dragons	24.2
Rebounds per game	Tavarion Nix	Cantho Catfish	15.8
Assists per game	David Arnold	Saigon Heat	5.9
Steals per game	Phạm Duy Hậu	Saigon Heat	2.0
Blocks per game	Darrell Miller	Saigon Heat	2.0
Turnovers per game	Rudolphe Joly	Danang Dragons	4.9
Fouls per game	Dmytri Guchko	Saigon Heat	4.0
Minutes per game	Trevor Berkeley	Hanoi Buffaloes	38.2
FG%	Ken Le	Danang Dragons	0.670
FT%	Lại Xương Thanh	Hochiminh City Wings	1.000
3P%	Hồng Gia Lân	Hochiminh City Wings	0.670

=== Team statistic leaders ===
Category	Team	Statistic
Points per game	Hochiminh City Wings	75.7
Rebounds per game	Hochiminh City Wings	36.4
Steals per game	Hanoi Buffaloes	9.7
Blocks per game	Hochiminh City Wings	3.4
FG%	Danang Dragons; Saigon Heat	0.440
FT%	Hochiminh City Wings; Cantho Catfish	0.570
3FG%	Hochiminh City Wings; Danang Dragons	0.300

== Awards ==
- Season MVP: Rudolphe Joly (Danang Dragons)
- Season Local MVP: Lê Ngọc Tú (Hochiminh City Wings)
- Defensive Player of the Year: Justin Young (Hochiminh City Wings)
- Rising Star: Khoa Tran (Saigon Heat)
- Sixth Man of the Year: Nguyễn Phú Hoàng (Hanoi Buffaloes)
- Coach of the Year: Todd Purves (Hanoi Buffaloes)
- Favorite Player of the Year: Nguyễn Phú Hoàng (Hanoi Buffaloes)
- All-VBA First Team
  - C Rudolphe Joly (Danang Dragons)
  - F Darrell Miller (Saigon Heat)
  - F Jaywuan Hill (Hochiminh City Wings)
  - G Tam Dinh (Cantho Catfish)
  - G David Arnold (Saigon Heat)
