= Tracy Thu Luong =

Vietnamese sports team owner

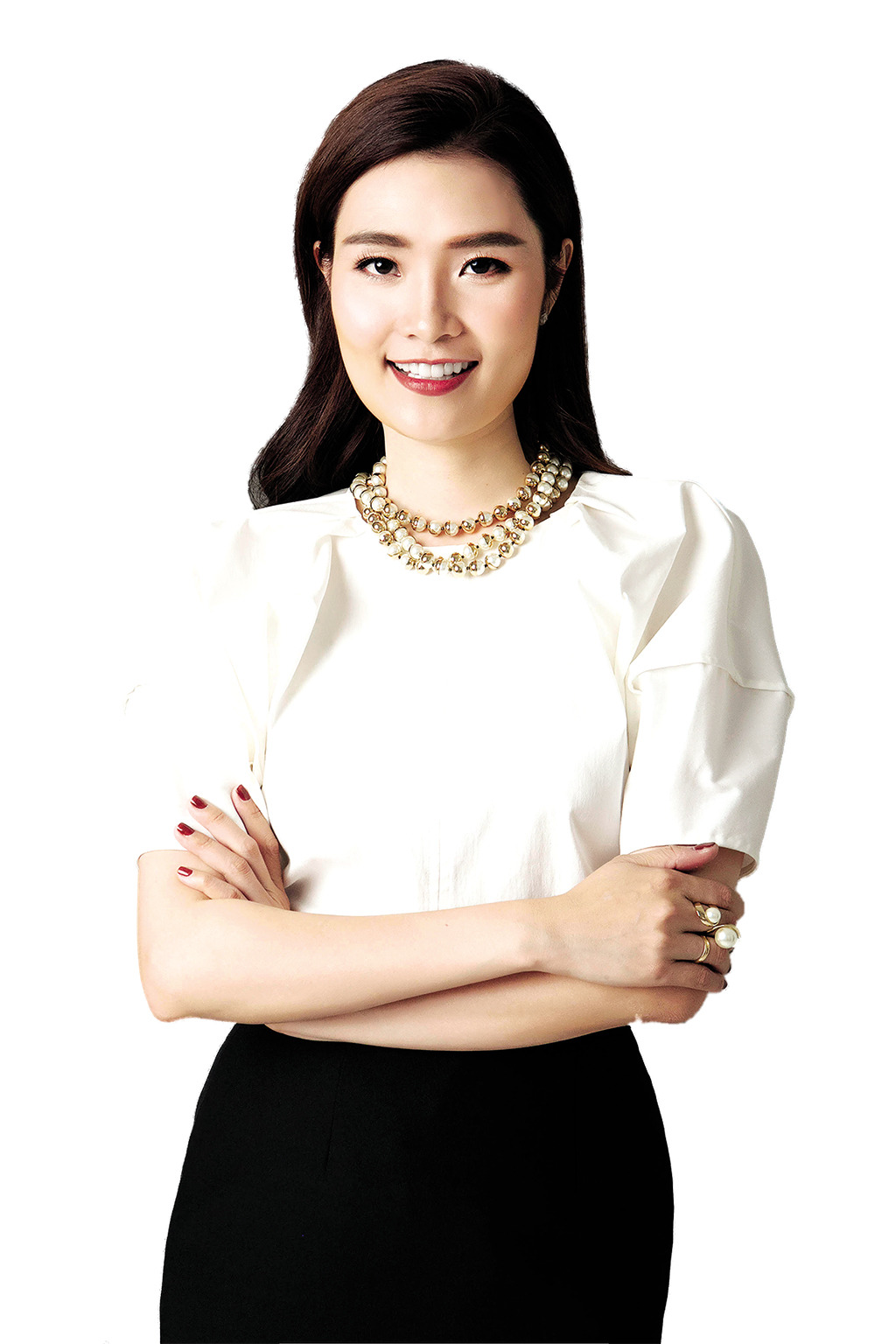
- Born: Lương Quỳnh Thư; 1987 (age 38–39); Ho Chi Minh City, Vietnam
- Education: Bachelor's degree in accounting and auditing, Ho Chi Minh City Open University
- Occupation: Owner - Thang Long Warriors Shareholder - Audi Vietnam Tracy Thu Luong on Instagram Tracy Thu Luong on Facebook

Tracy Thu Luong (Vietnamese: Lương Quỳnh Thư) is the first woman to own a team in the Vietnam Basketball Association (VBA).

== Career ==
In 2016, Audi Vietnam became one of VBA's sponsors. She then had the chance to work with the league's management and see their professionalism and much potential.

In 2017, she was given an opportunity to add a new team to VBA and immediately grabbed the chance. By that time, Ho Chi Minh City had already had two teams, so she chose Hanoi, which connected to a lot of her childhood memories, to be the home of VBA's sixth team. With all the ambition and preparation, her team, Thang Long Warriors, became the champion in 2017, right in the first season they joined the league.

In 2018, she established Thang Long Warriors Basketball Academy to train young players and enhance the sports culture in general and basketball culture specifically in Hanoi.

== Personal viewpoint ==
She is a feminist and supports gender equality.
