= Stefan Nguyen =

Vietnamese basketball player

Personal information
- Born: February 24, 1992 (age 34) Ängelholm, Sweden
- Listed height: 6 ft 4 in (1.93 m)
- Listed weight: 181 lb (82 kg)

Career information
- High school: Luleå Basketgymnasium
- Position: Point guard
- Number: 24

Career history
- 2011–2013: 08 Stockholm HR
- 2013–2015: Malbas
- 2015–2019: Saigon Heat
- 2016: Danang Dragons
- 2018–2019: Hanoi Buffaloes

Career highlights
- VBA champion (2016)
Medals
Men's basketball
Representing Vietnam
Southeast Asian Games
| Bronze medal – third place | 2019 Philippines | Team |

Stefan Nguyễn Tuấn Tú (born 24 February 1992) is a Vietnamese-Swedish basketball coach and former professional player. A point guard, he won the 2016 VBA title with the Danang Dragons and also played for the Saigon Heat and Hanoi Buffaloes.

== Early career ==
Stefan was born in Ängelholm to Vietnamese parents. He spent his high school years at the Luleå Riksbasket Gymnasium and also represented Sweden in various age groups internationally against the likes of Jonas Valančiūnas, Enes Kanter Freedom, Dario Šarić and Rudy Gobert.

== Pro career ==
After finishing up Highschool at the age of 18. He decided to go pro with 08 Stockholm. 2 years with 08 led to a move to Malbas Basket where he would be the key player to lead his team to the SBL in Sweden. After that successful season Stefan looked to play overseas and got in touch with Saigon Heat. Nguyen signed with the Saigon Heat prior to the 2015–16 ASEAN Basketball League.

== Coaching career ==
After retiring from professional basketball in 2020, he turned his attention to coaching full-time. He founded Next Level Basketball in 2018. He also serves as an assistant coach for the Danang Dragons of the VBA.

=== VBA statistics ===
| Year | Team | GP | GS | MPG | FG% | 3P% | FT% | RPG | APG | SPG | BPG | PPG |
|---|---|---|---|---|---|---|---|---|---|---|---|---|
| 2016 | Danang | 20 | 19 | 33 | .390 | .200 | .570 | 4.6 | 4.2 | 1.1 | .1 | 13.7 |
| 2018 | Hanoi Buffaloes | 17 | 17 | 32 | .440 | .310 | .620 | 4.4 | 2.5 | 1.7 | .1 | 15.2 |
| 2019 | Hanoi Buffaloes | 7 | 7 | 31 | .370 | .150 | .600 | 4 | 2.7 | 1.9 | .1 | 15.6 |
| Career | | 44 | 43 | 32 | .400 | .220 | .600 | 4.3 | 3.1 | 1.6 | .1 | 14.8 |
