= Gainesville Galaxy =

- Founded: 2011
- League: CBL (2011–present)
- Team history: Gainesville Galaxy (2011–present)
- Based in: Gainesville, Florida
- Arena: Martin Luther King, Jr. Recreation Center
- Colors: Orange, black
- Owner: Kristine Anderson
- Head coach: Donte Hill
- Website: Gainesville Galaxy's eteamz page.

The Gainesville Galaxy is a basketball team based in Gainesville, Florida. They began play in the Continental Basketball League (CBL) for the 2011–12 season. They play their games at the Martin Luther King, Jr. Recreation Center.

The team was founded as an expansion team in the CBL, a summer basketball league. The team's owner is Kristine Anderson, a Gainesville entrepreneur, educator, and former general manager of the Florida Makos, another Gainesville-based basketball team that played one season in the new American Basketball Association in 2010–2011. The Galaxy will retain former Makos players.
