= Collège d'Alma =

Public college in Alma, Quebec

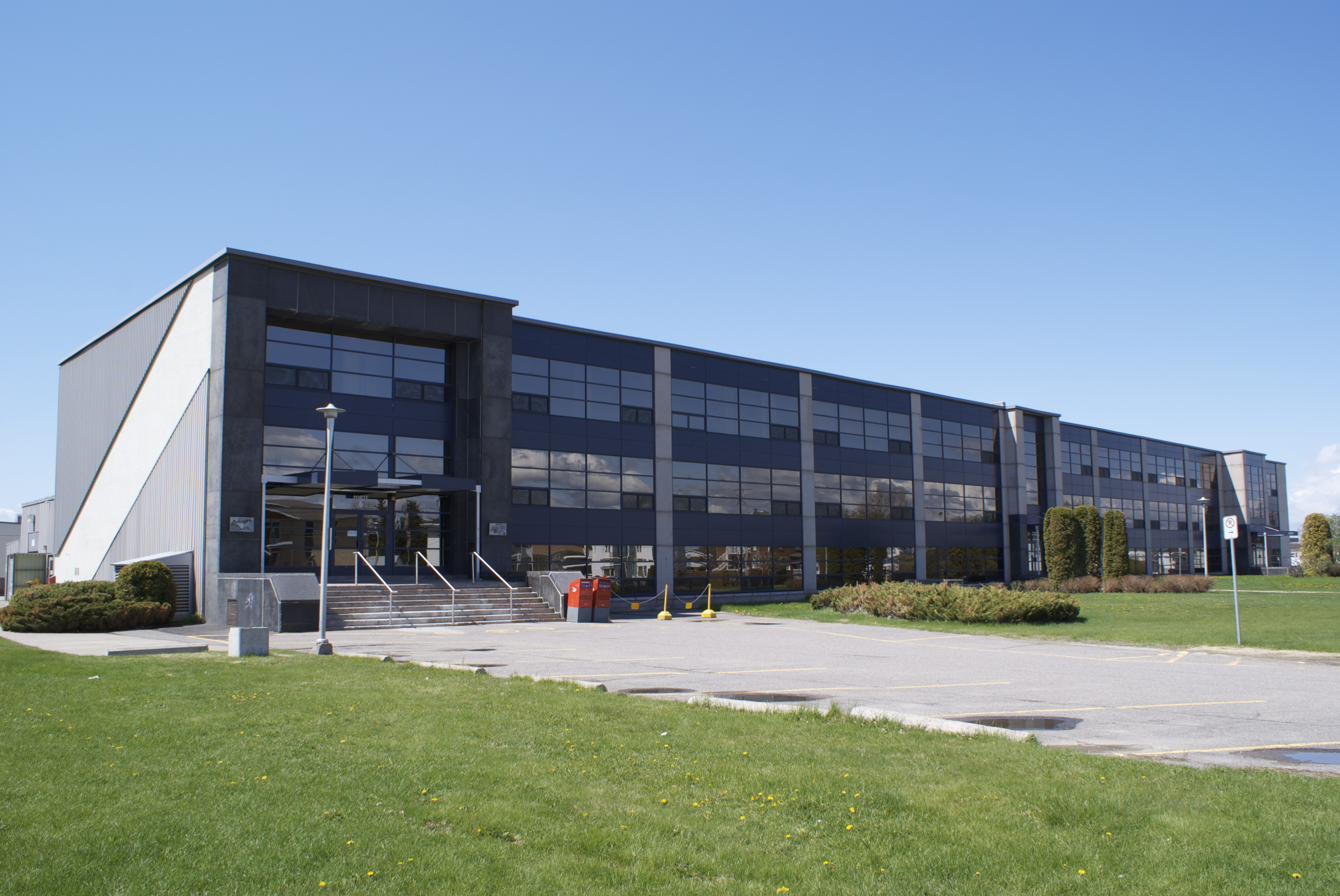
- Motto: Une vie stimulante (French)
- Motto in English: An interesting life
- Type: public CEGEP
- Established: 1968
- Academic affiliations: ACCC
- Academic staff: 150
- Students: 1200
- Location: Alma, Quebec, Canada; 48°32′42″N 71°39′17″W
- Campus: Urban
- Colours: Blue & red
- Nickname: Les Jeannois
- Sporting affiliations: CCAA
- Website: www.collegealma.ca

Collège d'Alma is a CEGEP in Alma, Quebec, Canada.

== History ==
The college traces its origins to the merger of several institutions which became public ones in 1967, when the Quebec system of CEGEPs was created. In 1970, l'Externat classique d'Alma was renamed le Collège du Lac-Saint-Jean and began delivering pre-university training. In 1972, Collège d'Alma was created on the campus du Collège régional du Saguenay-Lac-Saint-Jean. In 1980, the institution became autonomous.

== Programs ==
The CEGEP offers two types of programs: pre-university and technical. The pre-university programs, which take two years to complete, cover the subject matters which roughly correspond to the additional year of high school given elsewhere in Canada in preparation for a chosen field in university. The technical programs, which take three-years to complete, applies to students who wish to pursue a skill trade.

== Gallery ==
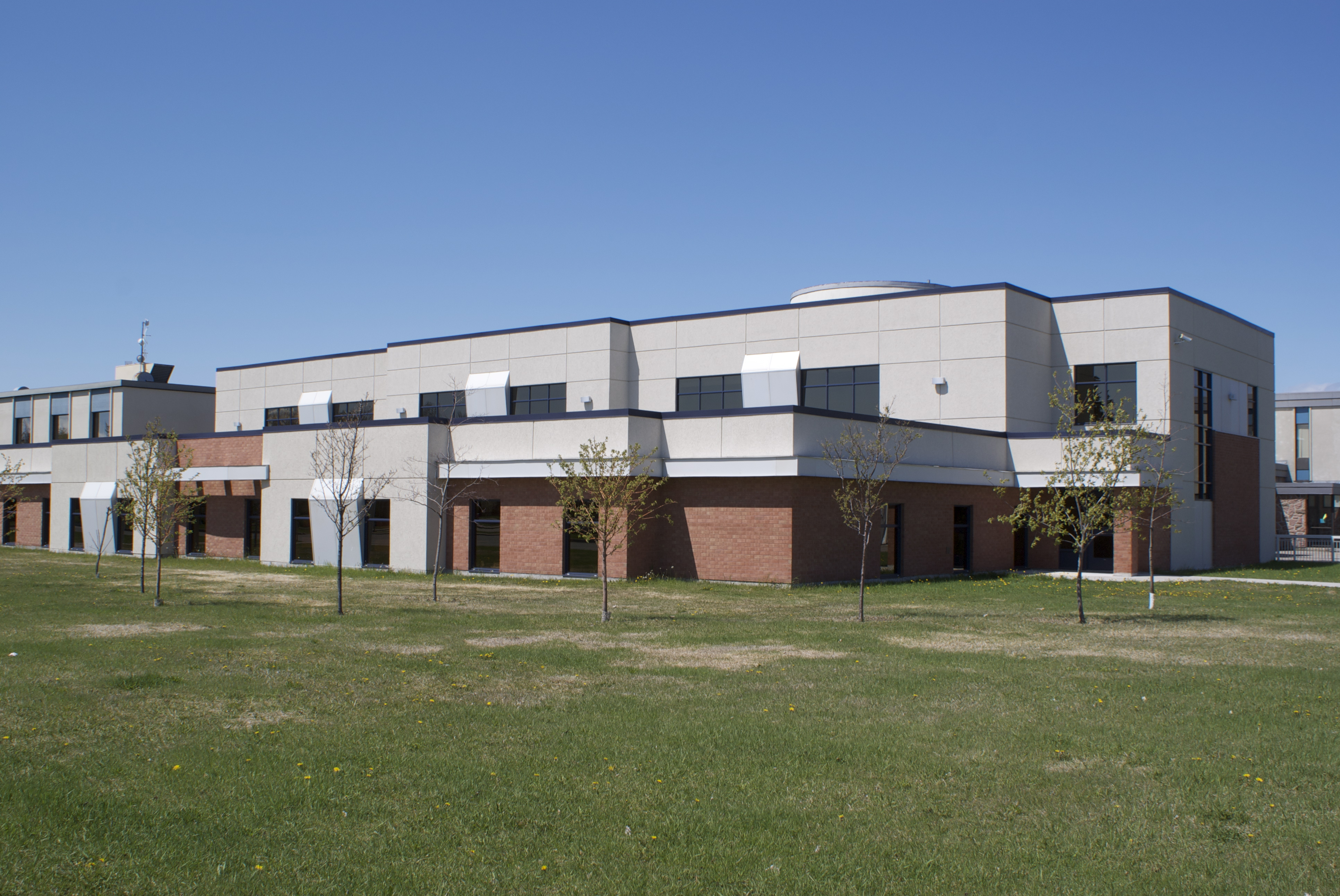
Collège d'Alma music pavilion

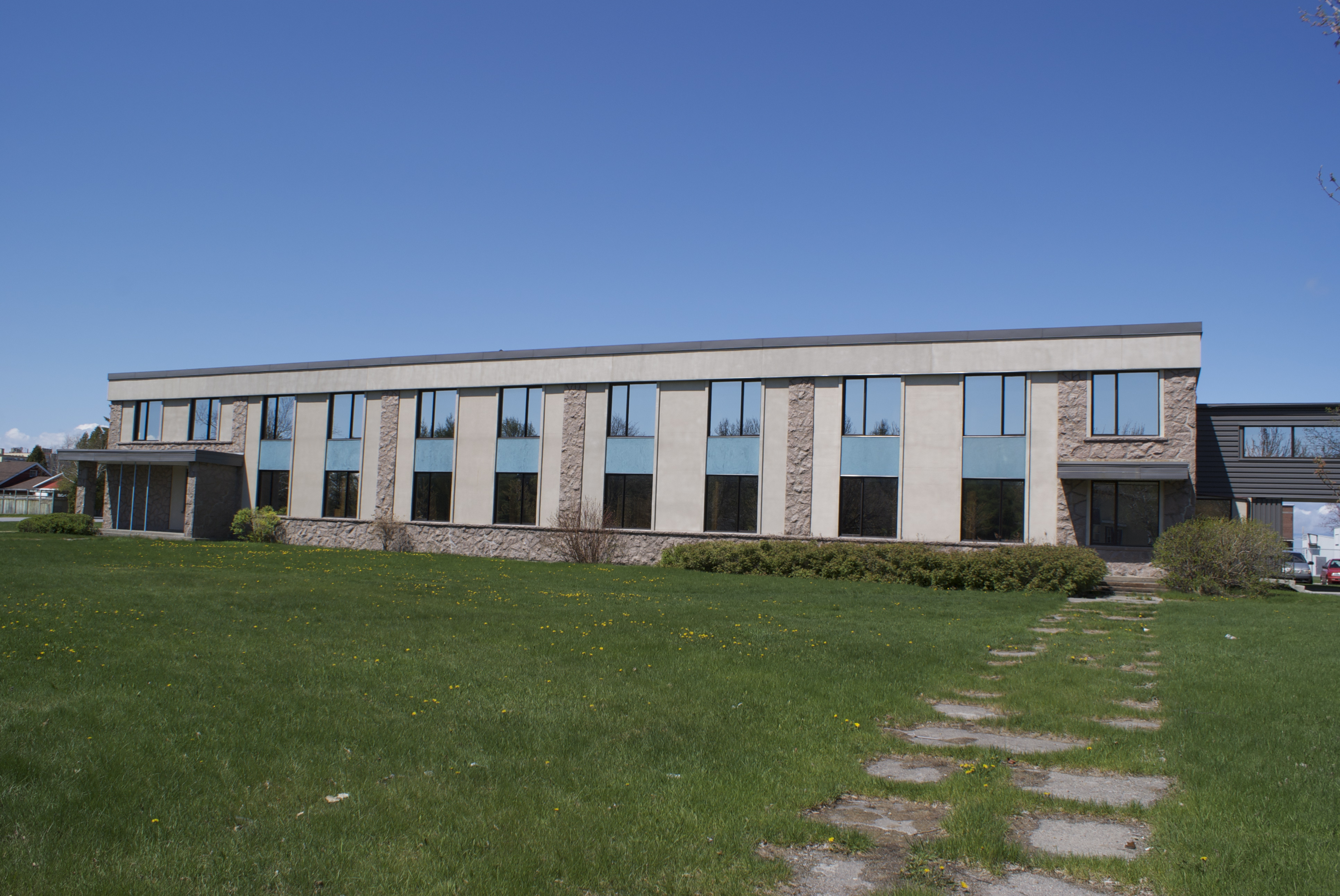
Collège d'Alma St Jude pavilion

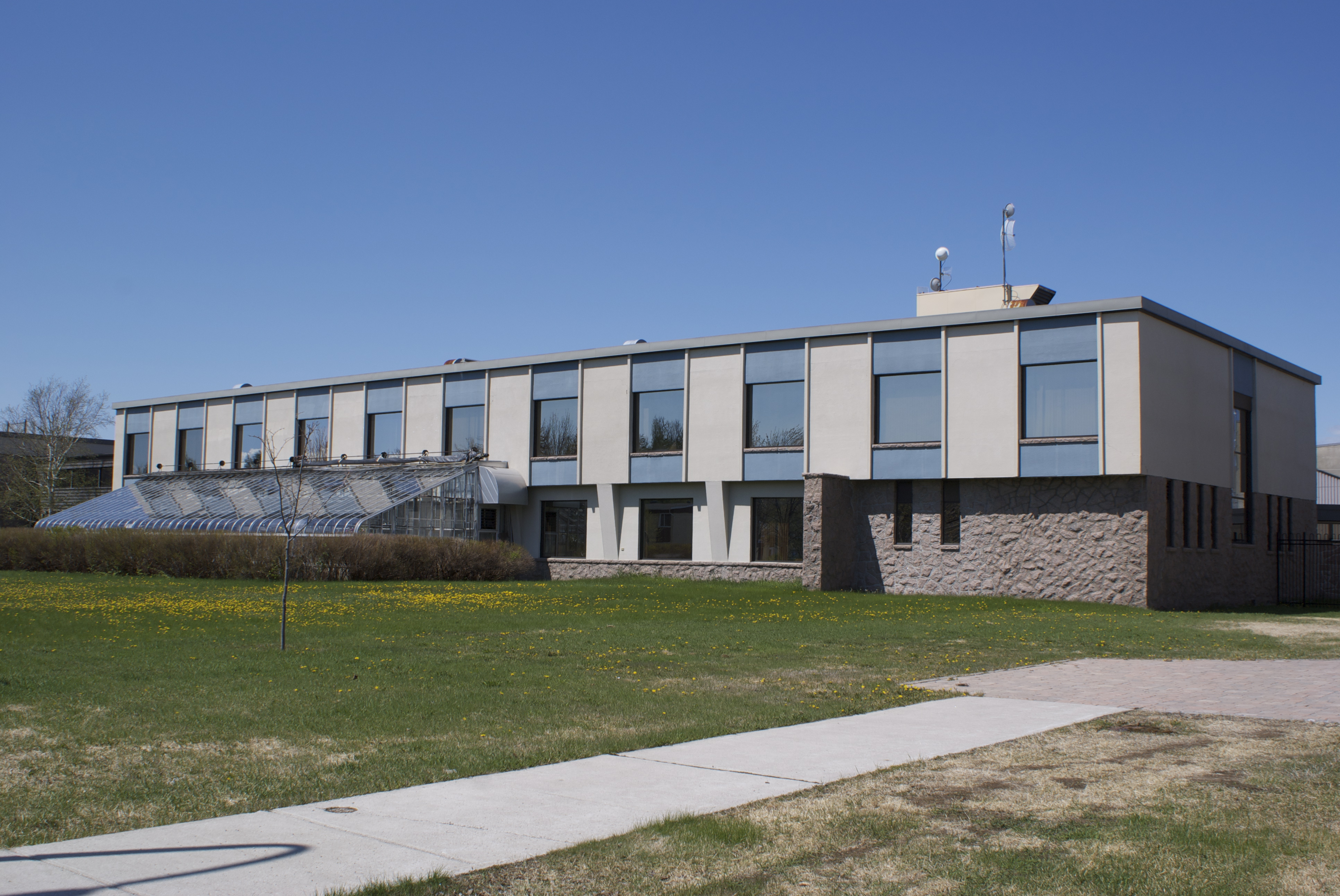
Collège d'Alma Curé-Lavoie pavilion

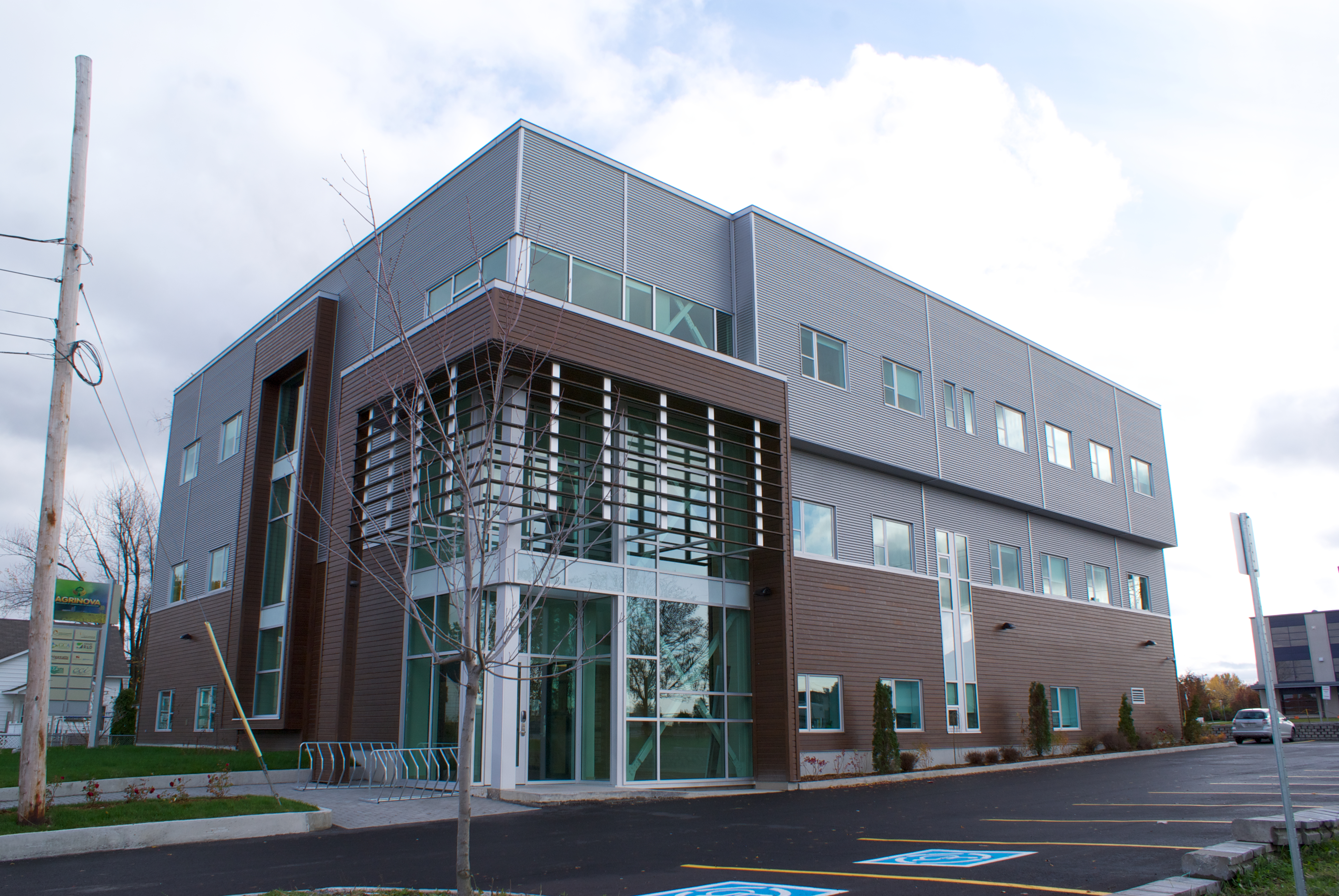
AGRINOVA Agriculture research centre

== See also ==
- List of colleges in Quebec
- Higher education in Quebec
