= Dilana Dilixiati =

Chinese basketball player (born 1997)

No. 17 – Guangdong Vermilion Birds
- Position: Center
- League: WCBA

Personal information
- Born: 7 January 1997 (age 29) Ürümqi, Xinjiang, China
- Listed height: 1.94 m (6 ft 4 in)

Career information
- Playing career: 2013–present

Career history
- 2013–2014: Shanxi Flame
- 2014–2015: Guangdong Dolphins
- 2015–2018: Xinjiang Magic Deer
- 2018–present: Guangdong Vermilion Birds

Dilana Dilixiati (uigur: دىلانا دىلشات; Chinese: 迪拉娜·迪里夏提; pinyin: Dílānà Dílǐxiàtí, born 7 January 1997) is a Chinese basketball player for the Guangdong Vermilion Birds of the Women's Chinese Basketball Association (WCBA) and the Chinese national team.

She played 3 on 3 basketball when young, and in 2014 was the flagbearer of the Chinese team in the Youth Olympic Games.

She also won a silver medal at the 2022 FIBA Women's Basketball World Cup.
