= Justin Young (basketball) =

Vietnamese-American basketball player

Personal information
- Born: March 9, 1993 (age 33) Monterey Park, California, U.S.
- Listed height: 6 ft 4 in (1.93 m)
- Listed weight: 205 lb (93 kg)

Career information
- High school: Mark Keppel (Alhambra, California)
- College: Chapman University (2011–2015)
- NBA draft: 2015: undrafted
- Playing career: 2016–present
- Position: Small forward / power forward

Career history
- 2016: Hochiminh City Wings
- 2017: Hanoi Buffaloes
- 2017–2023: Thang Long Warriors
- 2018: PEA

Career highlights
- VBA Defensive Player of the Year (2016); VBA Champion (2017)
Medals
Men's basketball
Representing Vietnam
Southeast Asian Games
| Bronze medal – third place | 2019 Philippines | Team |
Men's 3x3 basketball
Representing Vietnam
Southeast Asian Games
| Bronze medal – third place | 2019 Philippines | Team |
| Silver medal – second place | 2021 Vietnam | Team |

Justin Young Duong (Vietnamese: Dương Vĩnh Luân; born March 9, 1993) is a Vietnamese-American professional basketball player who last played for the Thang Long Warriors of the Vietnam Basketball Association (VBA).

== Professional career ==
=== Ho Chi Minh City Wings (2016) ===
In 2016, Young joined the Ho Chi Minh City Wings of the VBA prior to the league's inaugural season. At the conclusion of the season, he was named the Defensive Player of the Year, finishing with averages of 10.38 points, 10.52 rebounds, and 2 assists per game.

=== Thang Long Warriors (2017–2023) ===
Prior to the start of the 2017 season, Young decided not to re-sign with the Ho Chi Minh City Wings. Instead, he took his chances elsewhere in the 2017 VBA draft. On 14 June, he was selected by the Thang Long Warriors with the number one overall pick in the 2017 draft.

=== International ===
In 2018, Young received a Vietnamese passport, making him eligible for international play with the Vietnam men's national basketball team.

== Career statistics ==
Legend
| GP | Games played | GS | Games started | MPG | Minutes per game |
| FG% | Field goal percentage | 3P% | 3-point field goal percentage | FT% | Free throw percentage |
| RPG | Rebounds per game | APG | Assists per game | SPG | Steals per game |
| BPG | Blocks per game | PPG | Points per game | **Bold** | Career high |

=== VBA ===
| Year | Team | GP | GS | MPG | FG% | 3P% | FT% | RPG | APG | SPG | BPG | PPG |
|---|---|---|---|---|---|---|---|---|---|---|---|---|
| 2016 | Hochiminh City Wings | **21** | 17 | 33.7 | .390 | .110 | .410 | **10.5** | 2 | 1.9 | **1.4** | 10.4 |
| 2017 | Thang Long Warriors | 20 | **20** | **36.4** | .390 | **.240** | **.540** | 8 | **4.2** | 2 | .5 | 12.3 |
| 2018 | Thang Long Warriors | 17 | 16 | 36.3 | **.420** | .110 | .440 | 9.9 | 3.1 | **3.1** | .3 | **14.1** |
| Career | | 58 | 53 | 35.5 | .400 | .153 | .463 | 9.5 | 3.1 | 2.3 | .7 | 12.3 |

== Awards and honors ==
=== VBA ===
- Defensive Player of the Year: 2016
