= Kevin Yurkus =

American professional basketball coach

- Coaching career: 1994–present

Career history

Coaching
- 2016–2017: Nakhon Pathom Mad Goats
- 2017–2019: Cantho Catfish
- 2019–2020: Saigon Heat (VBA)
- 2019–2022: Saigon Heat
- 2019–2022: Vietnam National Basketball Team

Career highlights
- As a head coach: 2017, 2018 Vietnam Basketball Association Coach of the Year; 2018 Vietnam Basketball Association Champion; 2020 Vietnam Basketball Association Champion

Kevin Yurkus is an American professional basketball coach who was most recently head coach of Saigon Heat and the Vietnam national basketball team.

== Coaching career ==
=== Club coaching career ===
From 2016–2017, he coached the Nakhon Pathom Mad Goats in Thailand. After that, he came to Vietnam to coach Cantho Catfish from 2017–2019.

=== National team coaching career ===
From 2019 to 2022, Yurkus was the head coach of the senior Vietnamese national basketball team.
