= Thang Long Warriors =

- Nickname: Warriors
- Leagues: Vietnam Basketball Association
- Founded: 2017
- Arena: Tay Ho District Arena
- Team colours: Red, Black, White
- Main sponsor: Audi Vietnam
- President: Ms. Tracy Thu Luong
- Head coach: Chris Daleo
- Championships: VBA 2017
- Website: www.facebook.com/TLWarriors

The Thang Long Warriors is a Vietnamese professional basketball team founded in 2017 and based in Hanoi, Vietnam. They play in the Vietnam Basketball Association.

The Warriors won their first championship at the VBA 2017 and have never missed VBA Playoffs until 2022 when they finished 5-7 and missed the playoffs for first time ever.

Apart from playing pro, the Warriors also takes part in developing Vietnam basketball with their Thang Long Warriors Basketball Academy and their U19, U17 team.

== Season-by-season record ==
Season	Coach	Regular season				Postseason			
Season	Coach	Won	Lost	Win %	Finish	Won	Lost	Win %	Result
2017	Lee Tao Dana	12	3	.800	1st	5	2	.714	League Champions
2018	Predrag Lukic	10	5	.667	2nd	0	2	.000	Semi-finals
2019	Matt Juranek	7	8	.467	4th	1	2	.333	Semi-finals
2020	Predrag Lukic	8	4	.667	2nd	3	3	.500	Finals
2021	Predrag Lukic	Season canceled due to Covid-19							
2022	Predrag Lukic	5	7	.417	5th	Did not qualify			
2023	Chris Daleo	11	7	.611	4th	0	2	.000	Semi-finals
Totals		53	34	.609		9	11	.450	1 League Championship

== Current roster ==
Note: Flags indicate national team eligibility at FIBA-sanctioned events. Players may hold other non-FIBA nationalities not displayed.

Thang Long Warriors roster
Players
Coaches

Pos.	No.	Nat.	Name	Ht.	Wt.	DOB (YYYY-MM-DD)
G	0	(United States)	Sameen Swint (IP)	1.93 m (6 ft 4 in)	90 kg (198 lb)	31 – 28 January 1995
C	22	(United States)	John Fields III (IP)	2.06 m (6 ft 9 in)	110 kg (243 lb)	38 – 30 March 1988
F	12	(United States) (Vietnam)	Justin Young (HP)	1.93 m (6 ft 4 in)	95 kg (209 lb)	33 – 9 March 1993
G	8	(Vietnam)	Phạm Nhật Thái Quang	1.77 m (5 ft 10 in)	72 kg (159 lb)	19 – 31 May 2006
F/C	1	(Vietnam)	Đậu Trung Kiên	1.90 m (6 ft 3 in)	93 kg (205 lb)	25 – 30 July 2000
G	4	(Vietnam)	Nguyễn Anh Hào	1.81 m (5 ft 11 in)	79 kg (174 lb)	20 – 21 May 2005
G/F	5	(Vietnam)	Nguyễn Thành Công	1.85 m (6 ft 1 in)	87 kg (192 lb)	24 – 5 September 2001
G	6	(Vietnam)	Trương Hoàng Trung	1.75 m (5 ft 9 in)	74 kg (163 lb)	32 – 24 October 1993
F	7	(Vietnam)	Đặng Thái Hưng	1.87 m (6 ft 2 in)	83 kg (183 lb)	32 – 4 June 1993
F	11	(Vietnam)	Trần Phi Hoàng Long	1.83 m (6 ft 0 in)	78 kg (172 lb)	23 – 16 June 2002
C	14	(Vietnam)	Nguyễn Văn Hùng	1.95 m (6 ft 5 in)	90 kg (198 lb)	30 – 10 April 1995
G	9	(Vietnam)	Lê Hoàng Quân	1.85 m (6 ft 1 in)	78 kg (172 lb)	21 – 10 January 2005
G	30	(Vietnam)	Nguyễn Tuấn Anh	1.86 m (6 ft 1 in)	70 kg (154 lb)	24 – 13 August 2001
F	21	(Vietnam)	Hoàng Thế Hiển	1.87 m (6 ft 2 in)	80 kg (176 lb)	30 – 2 October 1995
G/F	65	(Vietnam)	Lê Hiếu Thành	1.80 m (5 ft 11 in)	83 kg (183 lb)	34 – 17 October 1991

Head coach

- (United States) Christopher Daleo

Assistant coach(es)

- (Vietnam) Nguyễn Việt Cường

Legend

- (C) Team captain
- (HP) Heritage player
- Injured

- Roster
Updated: 27 July 2022

== Head coach ==
- (United States) Lee Tao Dana (2017)
- (Serbia) Predrag Lukic (2018, 2020-2022)
- (United States) Matt Juranek (2019)
- (United States) Chris Daleo (2023)

== Uniforms ==
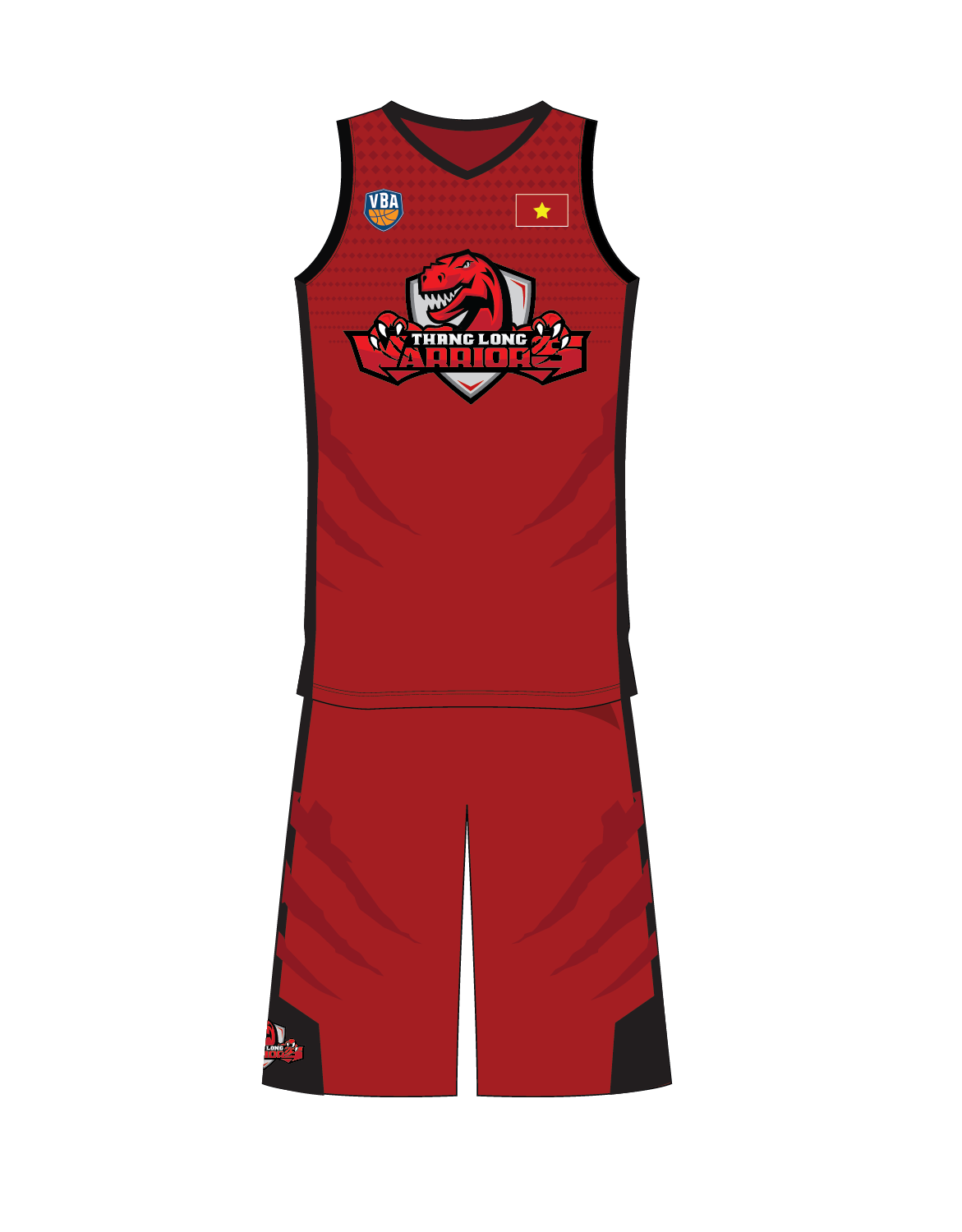
VBA 2017 - Home

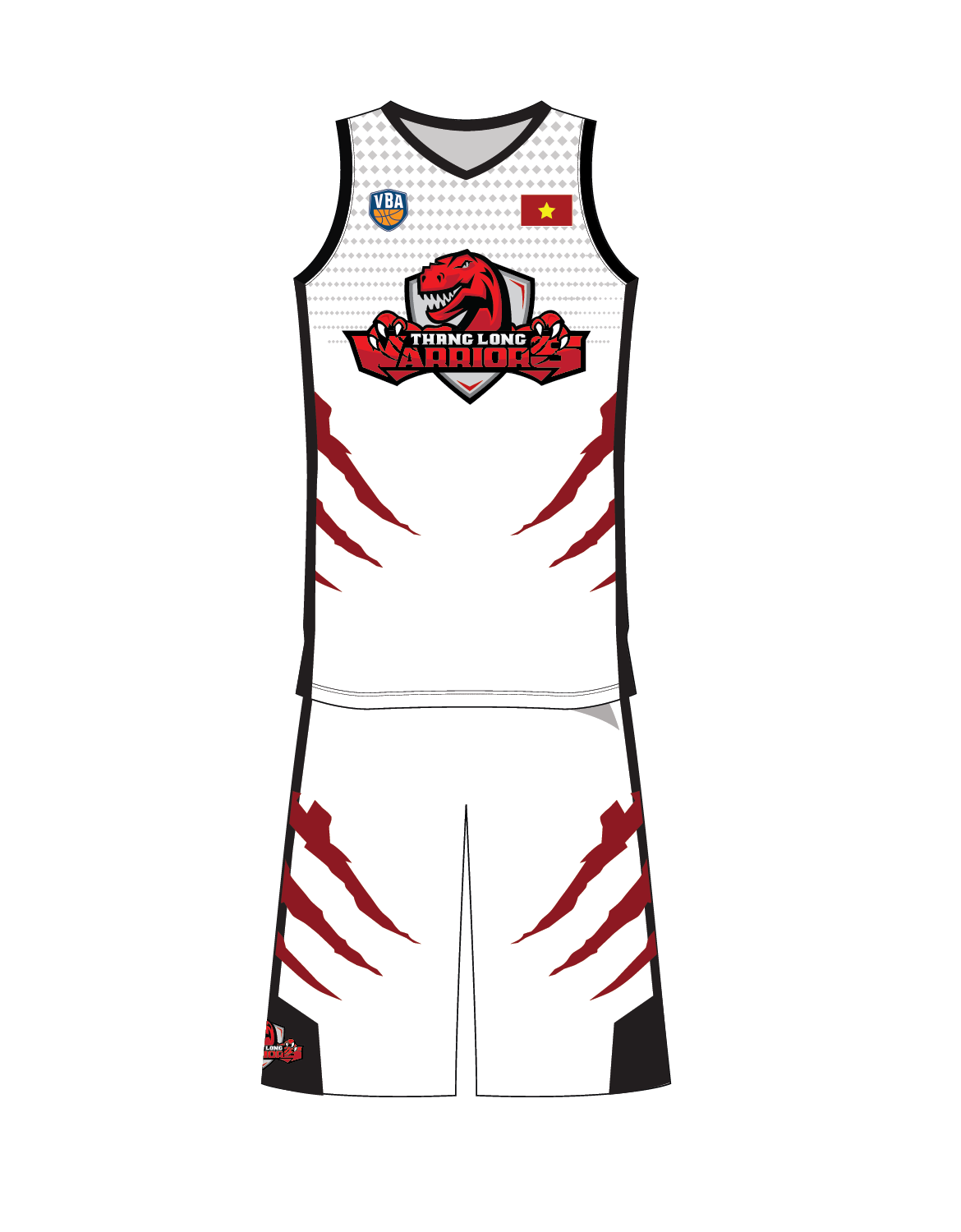
VBA 2017 - Away

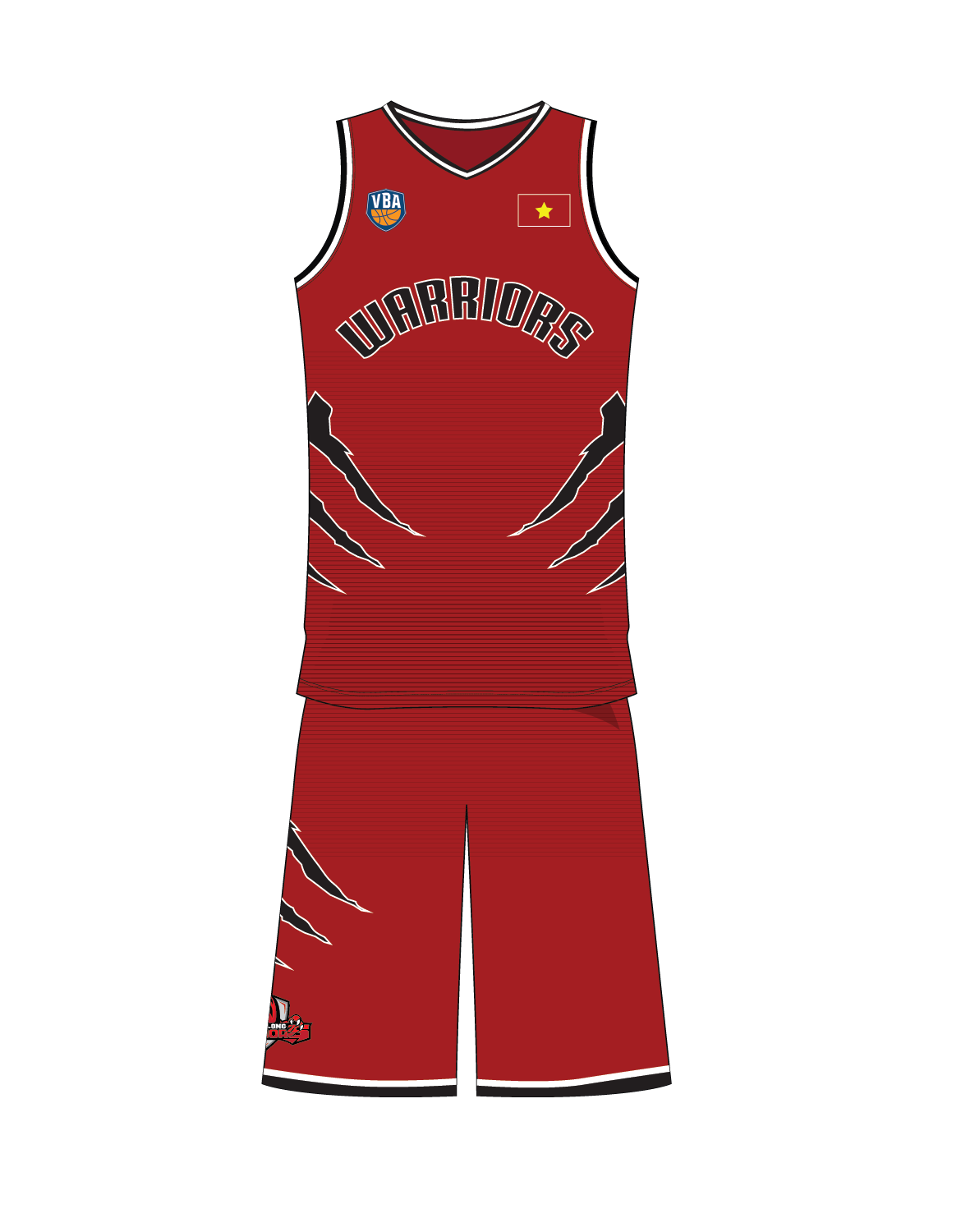
VBA 2018 - Home

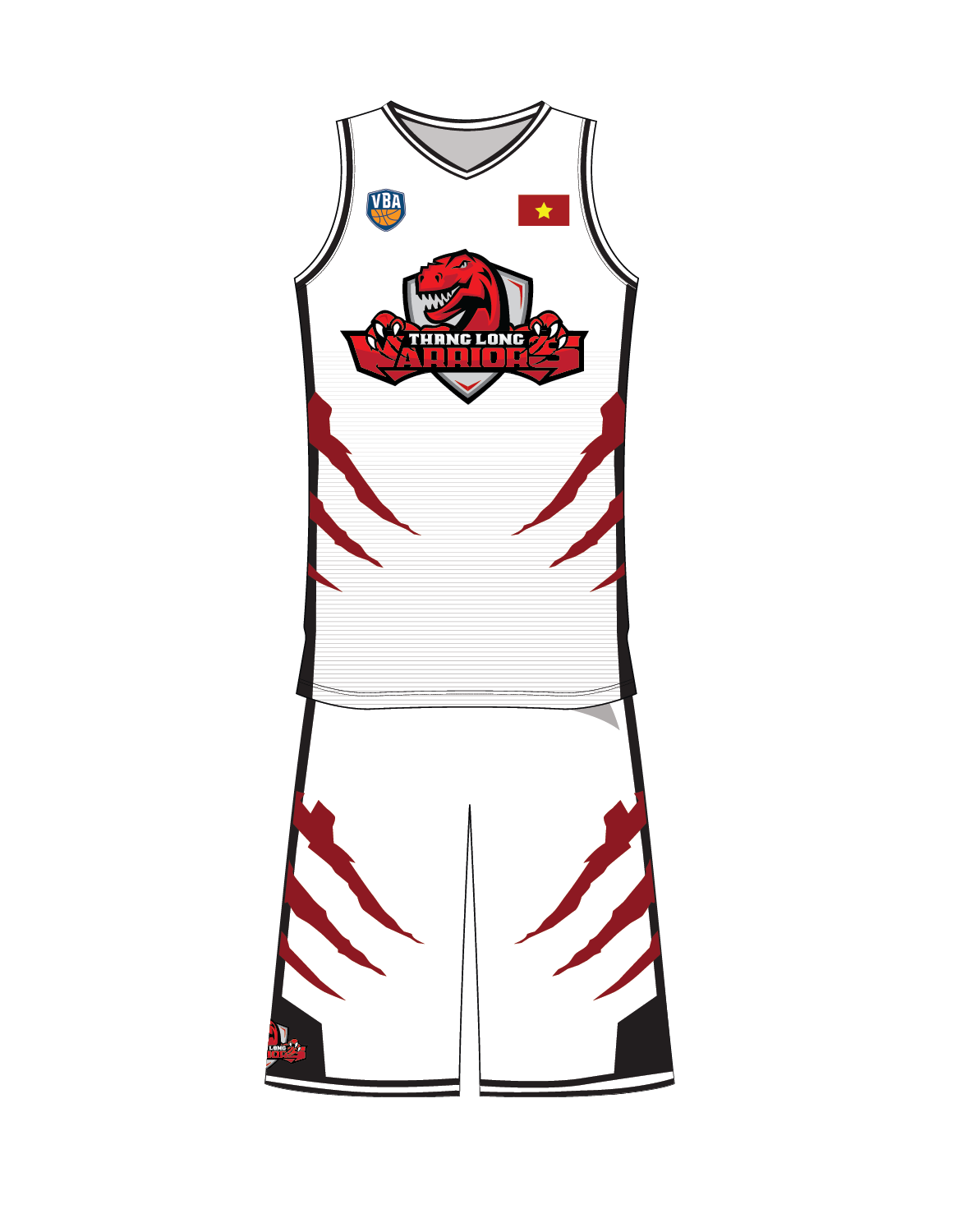
VBA 2018 - Away

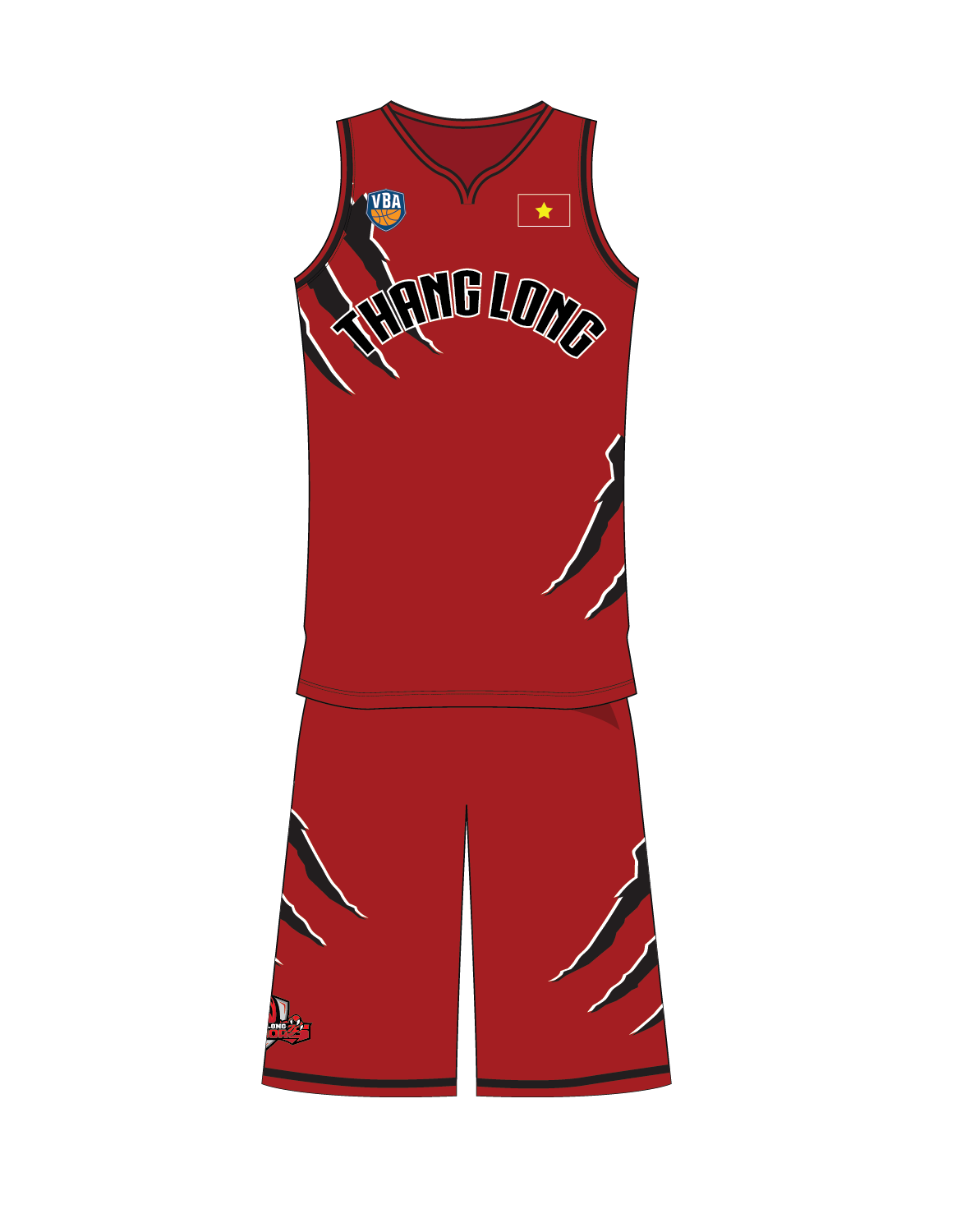
VBA 2019 - Home

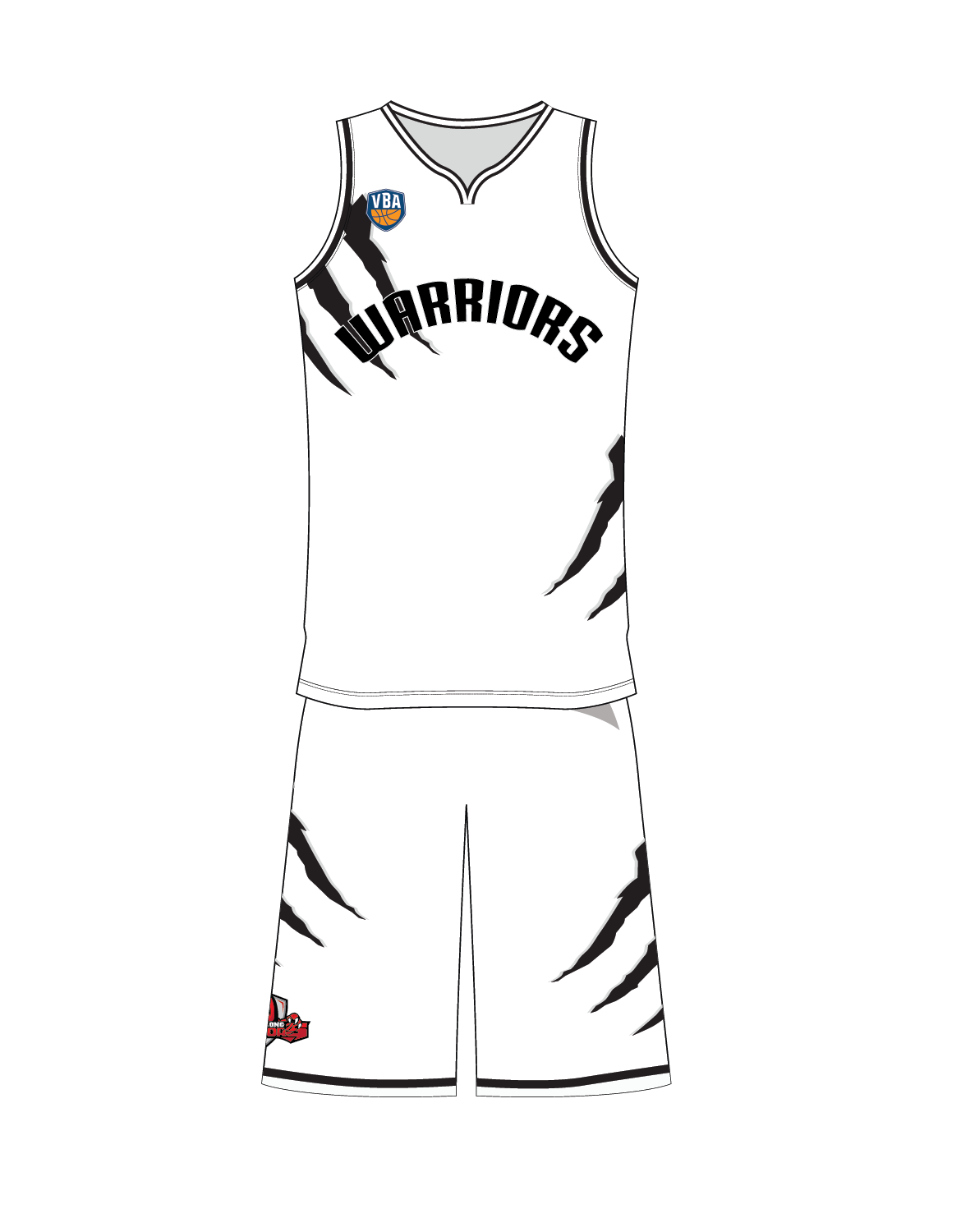
VBA 2019 - Away
