= Tony Garbelotto =

English basketball coach (b.1969)

Kesatria Bengawan Solo
- Position: Head coach
- League: IBL

Personal information
- Born: 2 January 1969 (age 57)
- Coaching career: 1992–present

Career history

Coaching
- 1992–1994: London Towers (Assistant)
- 1997: England (Assistant)
- 1998: England U-20 (Assistant)
- 1998–2000: KFÍ
- 2000–2002: Newcastle Eagles
- 2002–2003: Birmingham Bullets
- 2008–2012: Everton Tigers
- 2012–2014: MLP Academics Heidelberg
- 2014–2017: Saigon Heat
- 2014–2017: Vietnam
- 2017–2018: Glasgow Rocks
- 2017–2018: Great Britain
- 2017–2018: Scotland
- 2019–2020: Cyberdyne Ibaraki Robots
- 2021-2022: NSH Mountain Gold Timika
- 2022-2024: Bali United Basketball
- 2024-2025: RANS Simba Bogor
- 2025-present: Kesatria Bengawan Solo

Career highlights
- As coach: IBL Coach of the Year (2025); BBL Championship (2011); 2x BBL playoffs championship (2010, 2011); BBL Coach of the Year Award (2011); BBL Cup (2009); BBL Trophy (2011)

Anthony Garbelotto (born 2 January 1969) is an English basketball coach who coaches Kesatria Bengawan Solo of the Indonesian Basketball League (IBL).

== Coaching career ==
Garbelotto started his coaching career with hometown club London Towers in 1992, as an assistant coach, leaving the post just two years later. In 1997 he joined up with the England team set-up where he was again an assistant coach, before being promoted to head coach of the Under-23 team in 1998.

In 1998, Garbelotto accepted a job in Iceland, taking the reins of Úrvalsdeild club KFÍ, where he stayed for two years, also jointly coaching the Great Britain Students team in 1999. Upon his return to England in 2000, he was appointed head coach of fledgling British Basketball League club Newcastle Eagles where he immediately turned their fortunes. By the end of his first season at the club, Garbelotto's Eagles had reached the BBL Trophy final, while finishing 3rd place in the Northern Conference.

In 2002 he moved on to the Birmingham Bullets before settling with hometown club London United in 2006, upon their election to the BBL. From September 2003 to April 2008, Garbelotto was head coach of the Hackney Community College Basketball Academy programme. Alongside Sol Ayinla, he was instrumental in the programme's success, dominating national U19 competition.

He became head coach of Everton Tigers on 30 April 2008, and led the Tigers to five pieces of silverware including a 2010-11 treble.

In 2014 he signed on as an assistant coach to Jason Rabedeaux with the Saigon Heat. Thirteen games into the 2014 season, Rabedeaux died, leaving Garbelotto at the helm. The Heat finished the season in fourth place, clinching their first ever playoff berth. The Heat were swept 0-2 by the Westports Malaysia Dragons in the 2014 ABL playoffs.

In June 2017, Garbelotto was hired as the head coach of Scottish club Glasgow Rocks of the British Basketball League. In September 2017, took over as the head coach of the Scottish men's national basketball team for the 2018 Commonwealth Games, and the head coach of the Great Britain Men's national Team for the 2019 FIBA World Cup Qualifiers.

In February 2018, Garbelotto was fired as Scotland's head coach by basketballscotland and subsequently resigned from both the Great Britain National Team and the Glasgow Rocks.

== Head coaching record ==
Legend
Regular season	G	Games coached	W	Games won	L	Games lost	W–L %	Win–loss %
Playoffs	PG	Playoff games	PW	Playoff wins	PL	Playoff losses	PW–L %	Playoff win–loss %

Team	Year	G	W	L	W–L%	Finish	PG	PW	PL	PW–L%	Result
Ibaraki	2019-20	47	26	21	.553	3rd in B2 Eastern	-	-	-	–	-
