= Saigon Heat (VBA) =

- Leagues: Vietnam Basketball Association
- Founded: 2016
- Arena: CIS Arena
- Capacity: 2,500
- Location: Ho Chi Minh City, Vietnam
- Team colours: Red, Yellow, Black
- President: Connor Nguyen
- Head coach: Matthew Van Pelt
- Championships: 5 (2019, 2020, 2022, 2023, 2024)
- Website: vba.vn/heat
Home	Away

The Saigon Heat is a Vietnamese professional basketball team based in Ho Chi Minh City, Vietnam founded in 2016. It is the developmental team of the Saigon Heat. The team currently competes in the Vietnam Basketball Association, Vietnam's first professional basketball league.

== History ==
Following the completion of the 2015–16 season, the Heat announced the formation of Vietnam's first professional basketball league, the Vietnam Basketball Association, where they would field a developmental team. The Heat VBA team consists of local players, with several of the ABL side's players being distributed among the other VBA teams for league parity. In 2019, 2020, 2022 and 2023 they became the first team to win 4 consecutive Vietnam Basketball Association championship series.

== Season-by-season record ==
Season	Coach	Regular Season				Post Season			
Season	Coach	Won	Lost	Win %	Finish	Won	Lost	Win %	Result
2016	Tony Garbelotto	11	5	.688	1st	0	2	.000	Semi-finals
2017	David Singleton	9	6	.600	2nd	0	2	.000	Semi-finals
2018	David Singleton	9	6	.600	4th	0	2	.000	Semi-finals
2019	David Singleton	9	6	.600	2nd	5	2	.714	League Champions
2020	Kevin Yurkus	10	2	.833	1st	5	1	.833	League Champions
2021	Matthew Van Pelt	8	1	.888	1st	1	0	1.000	Quarterfinals; Season cut short due to COVID-19
2022	Matthew Van Pelt	9	3	.750	1st	5	0	1.000	League Champions
2023	Matthew Van Pelt	14	4	.778	1st	5	1	.833	League Champions
2024	David Grice	15	5	.750	1st	5	0	1.000	League Champions
2025	David Grice	11	7	.611	4th	0	2	.000	Semi-finals
2026	Vu The Cang	12	8	.600	2nd	5	1	.833	League Champions
Totals		117	53	.688		31	13	.704	6 League Championships

== Current roster ==
Note: Flags indicate national team eligibility at FIBA-sanctioned events. Players may hold other non-FIBA nationalities not displayed.

Saigon Heat roster
Players
Coaches

Pos.	No.	Nat.	Name	Ht.	Wt.	DOB (YYYY-MM-DD)
F	24	(United States)	Kentrell Barkley (IP)	1.98 m (6 ft 6 in)	93 kg (205 lb)	30 – 9 January 1996
G	0	(United States) (Vietnam)	Hassan Thomas (HP)	2.03 m (6 ft 8 in)	100 kg (220 lb)	30 – 11 June 1996
G	1	(Vietnam)	Lê Quang	1.75 m (5 ft 9 in)	72 kg (159 lb)	31 – 18 June 1995
G	3	(Vietnam)	Hoàng Tú	1.70 m (5 ft 7 in)	65 kg (143 lb)	25 – 19 January 2001
G	5	(Vietnam)	Đinh Quang Dương	1.86 m (6 ft 1 in)	86 kg (190 lb)	21 – 11 May 2005
G	7	(Vietnam)	Dư Minh An	1.78 m (5 ft 10 in)	80 kg (176 lb)	33 – 11 August 1993
G	10	(Vietnam)	Antony Sundberg	1.85 m (6 ft 1 in)	82 kg (181 lb)	24 – 11 August 2002
G/F	11	(Vietnam)	Võ Kim Bản	1.86 m (6 ft 1 in)	88 kg (194 lb)	26 – 24 March 2000
C	12	(Vietnam)	Nguyễn Huỳnh Phú Vinh	2.02 m (6 ft 8 in)	90 kg (198 lb)	28 – 7 May 1998
F	18	(Vietnam)	Nguyễn Phan Hồng Phúc	1.92 m (6 ft 4 in)	74 kg (163 lb)	20 – 18 January 2006
F	21	(Vietnam)	Nguyễn Hoàng Minh Tuấn	1.88 m (6 ft 2 in)	80 kg (176 lb)	19 – 8 January 2007
F	30	(Vietnam)	Tim Waale (C)	1.93 m (6 ft 4 in)	100 kg (220 lb)	28 – 22 September 1998
G	34	(Vietnam)	Võ Duy Linh	1.78 m (5 ft 10 in)	68 kg (150 lb)	27 – 7 June 1999
G	47	(Vietnam)	Huỳnh Trực Nhân	1.80 m (5 ft 11 in)	80 kg (176 lb)	24 – 24 August 2002

Head coach

- (United States) Matthew Van Pelt

Assistant coach(es)

- (United Kingdom) David Grice
- (Japan) Toshi Benson
- (Vietnam) Nguyễn Tùng Sơn

Legend

- (C) Team captain
- (HP) Heritage player
- Injured

- Roster
Updated: 7 June 2023
