= Saigon Heat =

Vietnamese professional basketball team

- 2024 Saigon Heat season
- Founded: 2011; 15 years ago
- Arena: CIS Arena
- Capacity: 1,300
- Location: Ho Chi Minh City, Vietnam
- Team colours: Red, Yellow, Black
- President: Connor Nguyen
- Head coach: Matthew Van Pelt
- Website: saigonheat.com
Home	Away

The Saigon Heat is a Vietnamese professional basketball team based in Ho Chi Minh City. Since the 2014 season, the Heat's home games are played at the CIS Arena on the campus of the Canadian International School in District 7. This is the first professional basketball team based in Vietnam.

The Heat currently plays in the VBA, Vietnam's first professional basketball league.

== History ==
The Saigon Heat are the first professional basketball team in Vietnam based in Ho Chi Minh City. They were officially announced as a member of the ASEAN Basketball League in October 2011. The team was formed by the Saigon Sports Academy, a multi-sports training academy launched in January 2009 and located in Ho Chi Minh City, Vietnam.

In their inaugural season, the Heat finished sixth in the ABL with a regular season record of 8–13. The Heat did not qualify in for the 2012 ABL playoffs. The Heat followed up their inaugural season with another disappointing sixth-place finish in an injury plagued 2013 season, highlighted by a twelve-game losing streak.

Thirteen games into the 2014 season, head coach Jason Rabedeaux suddenly died, the main cause of death was traumatic brain injury. Coach Rabedeaux's assistant Anthony Garbelotto was named the new head coach. The Heat finished the season in fourth place, clinching their first ever playoff berth. The Heat were swept 0–2 by the Westports Malaysia Dragons in the 2014 ABL playoffs.

Following the completion of the 2015–16 season, the Heat announced the formation of Vietnam's first professional basketball league, the Vietnam Basketball Association, where they would field a developmental team. The Heat VBA team consists of local players, with several of the ABL side's players being distributed among the other VBA teams for league parity purposes.

== Logos ==
2011–12 Original logo

2013 season logo

2014–present logo

== Season-by-season record ==
Season	Coach	Regular season				Postseason			
Season	Coach	Won	Lost	Win %	Finish	Won	Lost	Win %	Result
2012	Robert Newson	0	7	.000					
	Jason Rabedeaux	8	6	.571					
	Combined	8	13	.581	6th	Did not qualify			
2013	Jason Rabedeaux	4	18	.182	6th	Did not qualify			
2014	Jason Rabedeaux	6	7	.462					
	Tony Garbelotto	3	4	.429		0	2	.000	Semifinalists
	Combined	9	11	.450	4th				
2015–16	Tony Garbelotto	9	11	.450	4th	0	2	.000	Semifinalists
2016–17	Tony Garbelotto	8	12	.400	4th	0	2	.000	Semifinalists
2017–18	Kyle Julius	10	10	.500	6th	0	2	.000	Quarterfinalists
2018–19	Kyle Julius	14	12	.538	5th	1	2	.333	Quarterfinalists
2019–20	Kevin Yurkus	3	11	.214	10th	0	0	–	Season cut short due to COVID-19
2023	Matthew Van Pelt	11	3	.769	1st	3	3	.500	Runner-up
Totals		65	98	.399	-	4	13	.235	Best Results: Runner-up

== Home arenas ==
- Tân Bình Stadium (2012–2013)
- CIS Sports Arena (2014–present)

== 2023 roster ==
Note: Flags indicate national team eligibility at FIBA-sanctioned events. Players may hold other non-FIBA nationalities not displayed.

Saigon Heat roster
Players
Coaches

Pos.	No.	Nat.	Name	Ht.	Wt.	Age
F	0	(United States)	Jeremy Combs (WI)	2.01 m (6 ft 7 in)	82 kg (181 lb)	30 – 24 November 1995
G	1	(United States)	Evan Gilyard (WI)	1.77 m (5 ft 10 in)	77 kg (170 lb)	28 – 4 August 1998
G	3	(United States) (Vietnam)	Khoa Tran	1.84 m (6 ft 0 in)	75 kg (165 lb)	29 – 21 January 1997
F	6	(Vietnam)	Nguyễn Phúc Vinh	1.88 m (6 ft 2 in)	82 kg (181 lb)	24 – 11 September 2002
G	7	(Vietnam)	Dư Minh An	1.78 m (5 ft 10 in)	80 kg (176 lb)	33 – 11 August 1993
F	10	(United States) (Vietnam)	Hassan Thomas	2.03 m (6 ft 8 in)	98 kg (216 lb)	31 – 1 January 1995
G	11	(Vietnam)	Võ Kim Bản	1.86 m (6 ft 1 in)	80 kg (176 lb)	26 – 24 March 2000
C	12	(Vietnam)	Nguyễn Huỳnh Phú Vinh	2.02 m (6 ft 8 in)	90 kg (198 lb)	28 – 7 May 1998
G	13	(Vietnam)	Nguyễn Anh Kiệt	1.80 m (5 ft 11 in)	82 kg (181 lb)	24 – 24 February 2002
F	15	(United States)	Jarius Holder (WI)	2.01 m (6 ft 7 in)	82 kg (181 lb)	32 – 24 August 1994
F/C	30	(Denmark) (Vietnam)	Tim Waale (C)	1.93 m (6 ft 4 in)	100 kg (220 lb)	28 – 30 July 1998
G	47	(Vietnam)	Huỳnh Trực Nhân	1.78 m (5 ft 10 in)	82 kg (181 lb)	24 – 24 August 2002

Head coach

- (United States) Matthew Van Pelt

Assistant coach(es)

- (United Kingdom) David Grice
- (Vietnam) Vũ Thế Cang

Athletic trainer(s)

Legend

- (C) Team captain
- (WI) World import
- (AI) ASEAN heritage import
- Injured

=== Depth chart ===
Pos.	Starting 5	Bench 1	Bench 2
C	(United States) Jeremy Combs	(Vietnam) Nguyễn Huỳnh Phú Vinh
PF	(United States) Jarius Holder	(Denmark) (Vietnam) Tim Waale	(Vietnam) Nguyễn Phúc Vinh
SF	(United States) (Vietnam) Hassan Thomas	(Vietnam) Võ Kim Bản	(Vietnam) Nguyễn Anh Kiệt
SG	(United States) (Vietnam) Khoa Tran	(Vietnam) Huỳnh Trực Nhân
PG	(United States) Evan Gilyard	(Vietnam) Dư Minh An

== Head coaches ==
- (England) Robert Newson (2012)
- (United States) Jason Rabedeaux † (2012–2014)
- (England) Anthony Garbelotto (2014–2017)
- (Canada) Kyle Julius (2017–2019)
- (United States) Kevin Yurkus (2019–2022)
- (United States) Matthew Van Pelt (2022–present)

== See also ==
- Vietnam Basketball Association
