= 2020 Indonesian Basketball League =

- League: Indonesian Basketball League
- Sport: Basketball
- Duration: 20 – 24 November 2019 (Pre-season); 10 January – 8 March 2020 (originally until 22 March 2020 (regular season), 27 March until 19 April 2020 (plan A) and 13 until 27 October 2020 (plan B) (post season))
- TV partner(s): TVRI (Indonesia) (IBL); NET. (Indonesia) (President's Cup); Telkom Indonesia; YouTube (Worldwide)

2019 IBL Draft
- Top draft pick: Nikholas Mahesa
- Picked by: Louvre Surabaya

Regular season
- Top seed: not awarded
- Season MVP: Abraham Damar Grahita
- Top scorer: Mike Glover

Playoffs
- Finals champions: not awarded
- Finals MVP: not awarded

IBL Indonesia seasons
- ← 2019 2021 →

The 2020 Indonesian Basketball League was the fifth season of the Indonesian Basketball League since its re-branding by Starting5. The regular season began on 10 January 2020 and was suspended from 13 March until 23 June 2020, then both remaining series at the regular season in Yogyakarta (UNY) and Malang, as well as the post season in Jakarta have been cancelled as a result of the COVID-19 pandemic. The season originally resumed and concluded directly with the playoffs from 13 until 27 October 2020 at Mahaka Square, Jakarta. Originally, the playoffs were scheduled to begin on 27 March until 12 April 2020, and end with the Finals in 17 and 18 or 19 April 2020. The All-Star game was played on 9 February 2020, at the GOR UNY, Yogyakarta, and was won by IBL All-Stars, 157–155. There was no official Pre-Season held for this season, however 2019 Indonesia President's Cup that was held from 20 November to 24 November 2019 in Solo, Indonesia was treated as the pre-season.

== Teams ==
Teams	Head Coach	Captain	Home	Club City
Satya Wacana Salatiga	(Indonesia) Efri Meldi	(Indonesia) Cassiopea Manuputty	GOR Sahabat, Semarang	Salatiga
Bimaperkasa Yogyakarta	(United States) David Singleton	(Indonesia) Yanuar Dwi Priasmoro	GOR UNY (3000)	Yogyakarta
Amartha Hangtuah	(Indonesia) Rastafari Horongbala	(Indonesia) Abraham Wenas	Cilandak Arena	Palembang
NSH Jakarta	(Indonesia) A.F Rinaldo	(Indonesia) Widyantaputra Teja		Jakarta
Louvre Surabaya	(Indonesia) Andika Saputra	(Indonesia) Daniel Wenas	DBL Arena, Surabaya(3,000)	Surabaya
Prawira Bandung	(Indonesia) Andre Yuwadi	(Indonesia) Diftha Pratama	C-Tra Arena (2,500)	Bandung
Pacific Caesar Surabaya	(Indonesia) Aries Herman	(Indonesia) Yerikho Tausela	GOR Pacific Caesar (2,000)	Surabaya
Indonesia Patriots	(Serbia) Rajko Toroman	(Indonesia) Arki Wisnu	Hall A Senayan (4,000)	Jakarta
Pelita Jaya Jakarta	(Indonesia) Octaviarro Romely Tamtelahitu	(Indonesia) Adhi Pratama	Soemantri Brodjonegoro Stadium (5,000)	Jakarta
Satria Muda Pertamina Jakarta	(Serbia) Miloš Pejić	(Indonesia) Christian Gunawan	Mahaka Square (4,000)	Jakarta

== Schedule ==
Phase	Round	Date	Arena
Pre-season		20–24 November 2019	Sritex Arena, Solo
Regular season	Series I	10–12 January 2020	GOR Sahabat, Semarang
Regular season	Series II	17–19 January 2020	C-Tra Arena, Bandung
Regular season	Series III	31 January – 2 February 2020	Mahaka Square, Jakarta
Regular season	Series IV	6–8 February 2020	GOR Amongrogo, Yogyakarta
All Star		9 February 2020	GOR Amongrogo, Yogyakarta
Regular season	Series V	28 February 2020 – 1 March 2020	GOR Jayabaya, Kediri
Regular season	Series VI	6–8 March 2020	DBL Arena, Surabaya
Regular season	~~Series VII~~	~~13–15 March 2020~~	~~GOR Bimasakti, Malang~~
Regular season	~~Series VIII~~	~~20–22 March 2020~~	~~GOR UNY, Yogyakarta~~
~~Playoffs~~	~~First round~~	~~13-TBD October 2020~~	~~Mahaka Square, Jakarta (originally will be held at GOR Bimasakti, Malang (first round) and C-Tra Arena, Bandung (semi-finals))~~
~~Playoffs~~	~~Semi-finals~~	~~TBD October 2020~~	~~Mahaka Square, Jakarta (originally will be held at GOR Bimasakti, Malang (first round) and C-Tra Arena, Bandung (semi-finals))~~
~~Playoffs~~	~~Finals~~	~~TBD October 2020~~	~~Mahaka Square, Jakarta (originally will be held at GOR Bimasakti, Malang (first round) and C-Tra Arena, Bandung (semi-finals))~~

== Transactions ==
Name	Old club	New club
(Indonesia) Andakara Prastawa	Pelita Jaya Jakarta	Indonesia Patriots
(Indonesia) Abraham Damar Grahita	Stapac Jakarta	Indonesia Patriots
(Indonesia) Kaleb Gemilang	Stapac Jakarta	Indonesia Patriots
(Indonesia) Mei Joni	Stapac Jakarta	Indonesia Patriots
(Indonesia) Vincent Rivaldi Kosasih	Stapac Jakarta	Indonesia Patriots
(Indonesia) Muhammad Hardian Wicaksono	Pacific Caesar Surabaya	Indonesia Patriots
(Indonesia) Arki Wisnu	Satria Muda Pertamina Jakarta	Indonesia Patriots
(Indonesia) Hardianus Lakudu	Satria Muda Pertamina Jakarta	Indonesia Patriots
(Indonesia) Laurentius Steven Oei	Satria Muda Pertamina Jakarta	Indonesia Patriots
(Indonesia) Kevin Yonas Sitorus	Satria Muda Pertamina Jakarta	Indonesia Patriots
(United States) (Indonesia) Brandon Jawato	CLS Knights Indonesia/Louvre Surabaya	Indonesia Patriots
(Indonesia) Galank Gunawan	Bimaperkasa Yogyakarta	Louvre Surabaya
(Indonesia) Samuel Benedict Pamelay	Bimaperkasa Yogyakarta	Louvre Surabaya
(Indonesia) Wendha Wijaya	NSH Jakarta	Louvre Surabaya
(Indonesia) Daniel Wenas	Siliwangi Bogor	Louvre Surabaya
(Indonesia) Kevin Moses Poetiray	Siliwangi Bogor	Louvre Surabaya
(Indonesia) Luthfianes Gunawan	Prawira Bandung	Louvre Surabaya
(Indonesia) Yurifan Hosen	Satya Wacana Salatiga	Louvre Surabaya
(Indonesia) Dimaz Muharri	Free agent	Louvre Surabaya
(Indonesia) Gusti Putu Suputra	Free agent	Louvre Surabaya
(Indonesia) Dio Tirta Saputra	Free agent	Louvre Surabaya
(Indonesia) Leonardo Effendy	Free agent	Louvre Surabaya
(United States) (Indonesia) Jamarr Johnson	Satria Muda Pertamina Jakarta	Louvre Surabaya
(Indonesia) Tri Hartanto	NSH Jakarta	Pelita Jaya Jakarta
(Indonesia) Teddy Apriyana Romadonsyah	Siliwangi Bogor	Pelita Jaya Jakarta
(Indonesia) Katon Adjie	CLS Knights Indonesia	Pelita Jaya Jakarta
(Indonesia) Bima Riski Ardiansyah	CLS Knights Indonesia	Satria Muda Pertamina Jakarta
(Indonesia) Ngurah Wisnu Saputra	CLS Knights Indonesia	Satria Muda Pertamina Jakarta
(Indonesia) Arif Hidayat	CLS Knights Indonesia	Prawira Bandung
(Indonesia) Firman Dwi Nugroho	CLS Knights Indonesia	Prawira Bandung
(Indonesia) Muhammad Dhiya Ulhaq	Satria Muda Pertamina Jakarta	Prawira Bandung
(Indonesia) Widyanta Putra Teja	Stapac Jakarta	NSH Jakarta
(Indonesia) Rizky Effendi	Stapac Jakarta	NSH Jakarta
(Indonesia) Jan Misael Panagan	CLS Knights Indonesia	NSH Jakarta
(Indonesia) Randika Aprilian	Free agent	NSH Jakarta
(Indonesia) Muhammad Yugie	Siliwangi Bogor	NSH Jakarta
(Indonesia) Fadlan Minallah	Siliwangi Bogor	Satria Muda Pertamina Jakarta
(Indonesia) Fisyaiful Amir	Siliwangi Bogor	Amartha Hangtuah
(Indonesia) Kelly Purwanto	Siliwangi Bogor	Amartha Hangtuah
(Indonesia) Muhammad Surya Jayadiwangsa	Satria Muda Pertamina Jakarta	Amartha Hangtuah
(Indonesia) Gunawan	Satria Muda Pertamina Jakarta	Amartha Hangtuah
(Indonesia) Raja Anugerah	Free agent*^{Undrafted Rookie}	Pacific Caesar Surabaya
(Indonesia) Yoseph Wijaya	NSH Jakarta	Pacific Caesar Surabaya
(Indonesia) Donny Ristanto	Pacific Caesar Surabaya/Free agent*^{Retired}	Pacific Caesar Surabaya
(Indonesia) Dicky Satria Wibisono	Pacific Caesar Surabaya/Free agent*^{Retired}	Pacific Caesar Surabaya
(Indonesia) Nuke Tri Saputra	Pacific Caesar Surabaya/Free agent*^{Retired}	Bimaperkasa Yogyakarta
(Indonesia) Vincent Sanjaya	Satya Wacana Salatiga	Bimaperkasa Yogyakarta

== Foreign players ==
Each club in the first divisions will be allowed up to three registered foreign players, excluding one foreign-born player who has become a naturalized Indonesian citizen. Two foreign players will be allowed on the court. Naturalized players can play as Indonesian citizens and have no limitations. Each club will be allowed one naturalized player.

Teams	Foreign 1	Foreign 2	Foreign 3	Former Players
Louvre Surabaya	(United States) Savon Goodman	(United States) Martavious Irving	(United States) Michael Ayodele Kolawole	
Satya Wacana Salatiga	(United States) Daniel Hurtt	(United States) Montreal Williams	(United States) Christopher Sterling	(United States) Hal Shane Heyward
Amartha Hangtuah	(United States) Emilio park	(United States) Dakota Zinser	(United States) Laquavius Cotton	(United States) Darnell Aaron Martin Jr. (United States) Charles Lowell Jackson Jr. (United States) Thurron Steven Malloy Jr.
Pacific Caesar Surabaya	(United States) Denarius Odell	(United States) (Dominican Republic) Luis Jacobo	(United States) Anton Davon Waters	(United States) Decorey Aaron Jones (United States) Taylor Statham
Prawira Bandung	(United States) Marquel Beasley	(United States) William Tinsley	(United States) Glen Thomas Burns	(United States) Jared Harper (United States) (Uganda) Jordin Mayes (United States) David Samuel (United States) Dimitri Cook
Satria Muda Pertamina Jakarta	(United States) Gary Jacobs Jr.	(United States) Elijah Foster	(United States) Shawntez Patterson	(United States) Tyquan Scott
Bimaperkasa Yogyakarta	(Serbia) Filip Pejovic	(United States) David Marsellas Lawson	(Mali) Mamadou Diakite	(United States) David Seagers (United States) Blake Ty Truman (United States) Devin Gilligan
Pelita Jaya Basketball	(United States) Dior Lowhorn	(United States) Michael Adam Murray	(United States) Kevin Kardell Bridgewaters	(United States) Stephen Deangelo Battle
NSH Jakarta	(United States) Dashaun Wiggins	(United States) Jordan Madrid-Andrews	(United States) Michael Edward Glover	

== IBL Draft Local Player ==
=== 1st round ===
Round	Pick	Name	Pos	Age	Height	Club	University
1	1	Nikholas Mahesa	PG	23	1.69 m	Louvre Surabaya	(Indonesia) Harapan Bangsa Institute of Technology
1	2	Alexander Franklin	SG		1.80 m	Satya Wacana Salatiga	(Indonesia) Satya Wacana Christian University
1	3	Firman Yohanes	SF	23	1.85 m	Amartha Hangtuah	(Indonesia) Bengkulu
1	4	Arisandra Satya	C	24	1.95 m	Pacific Caesar Surabaya	(Indonesia) 17 August 1945 Jakarta University
1	5	Alba Pedro	PG	23	1.83 m	Prawira Bandung	(Indonesia) 17 August 1945 Jakarta University
1	6	Aris Rinaldi	F/C	22	1.86 m	Satria Muda Pertamina Jakarta	(Indonesia) Bengkulu
1	7	Reza Arfah Roediana	G	32	1.78 m	Bimaperkasa Yogyakarta	(Indonesia) West Java
1	8	Erick Wibowo Prawitra				Pelita Jaya Basketball	(Indonesia) Bali
1	9	PASS				NSH Jakarta	

=== 2nd round ===
Round	Pick	Name	Pos	Age	Height	Club	University
1	1	Dio Syahputra	SF	22	1.79 m	Louvre Surabaya	(Indonesia) STIE Kesatuan
1	2	PASS				Satya Wacana Salatiga	
1	3	PASS				Amartha Hangtuah	
1	4	PASS				Pacific Caesar Surabaya	
1	5	PASS				Prawira Bandung	
1	6	PASS				Satria Muda Pertamina Jakarta	
1	7	PASS				Bimaperkasa Yogyakarta	
1	8	PASS				Pelita Jaya Basketball	
1	9	Fachrul Asyam	PF	22	1.85 m	NSH Jakarta	(Indonesia) 17 August 1945 Jakarta University

=== Recommended Player round ===
Round	Pick	Name	Pos	Age	Height	Club	University
RP	Special	Leonardo Effendy	C	21	1.89 m	Louvre Surabaya	Sebelas Maret University
RP	Special	Dio Tirta Saputra	G	21	1.95 m	Louvre Surabaya	Universitas Negeri Malang
RP	Special	Gusti Putu Suputra	G	27	1.80 m	Louvre Surabaya	Bali
RP	1	Antoni Erga	PG	19	1.80 m	Satya Wacana Salatiga	Satya Wacana Christian University
RP	2	Muhammad Lakha Kurniawan	F	22	1.89 m	Amartha Hangtuah	STIE Bhakti Pembangunan
RP	3	Gabriel Senduk	F/C	22	1.92 m	Pacific Caesar Surabaya	Pelita Harapan University
RP	4	Andrian Danny Christianto	G/F	21	1.85 m	Prawira Bandung	Pelita Harapan University
RP	5	Rivaldo Tandra Pangesthio	SG/SF	23	1.90 m	Satria Muda Pertamina Jakarta	Pelita Harapan University
RP	6	Tifan Eka Pradita	F	21	1.78 m	Bimaperkasa Yogyakarta	Central Java
RP	7	None				Pelita Jaya Basketball	
RP	8	William Beckham Mamahi Pontoh	SF	19	1.80 m	NSH Jakarta	North Sulawesi

== Preseason ==
All games were held in Sritex Arena, Solo

=== Preliminary round ===
All times are local (UTC+7).

=== Group A ===
Pos	Team	Pld	W	L	Pts	
1	Amartha Hangtuah	2	1	1	3	Advance to semi-finals
2	Satya Wacana Salatiga	2	1	1	3	Advance to semi-finals
3	Pacific Caesar Surabaya	2	0	2	2	Advance to 7th–8th place round

=== Group B ===
Pos	Team	Pld	W	L	Pts	
1	Pelita Jaya Jakarta	2	2	0	4	Advance to semi-finals
2	Bimaperkasa Yogyakarta	2	1	1	3	Advance to 5th–6th place round
3	NSH Jakarta	2	0	2	2	9th place

=== Group C ===
Pos	Team	Pld	W	L	Pts	
1	Satria Muda Pertamina Jakarta	2	1	1	3	Advance to semi-finals
2	Prawira Bandung	2	1	1	3	Advance to 5th–6th place round
3	Louvre Surabaya	2	1	1	3	Advance to 7th–8th place round

=== Classification round ===
==== 7th–8th place round ====
23 November 2019
Louvre Surabaya	71–56	Pacific Caesar Surabaya

==== 5th–6th-place game ====
24 November 2018
Bimaperkasa Yogyakarta	55–70	Prawira Bandung

=== Finals round ===
Semi-finals
November 23
Amartha Hangtuah	65
Satya Wacana Salatiga	57
November 23
Pelita Jaya Jakarta	51
Satria Muda Pertamina Jakarta	62

Final
November 24
Satria Muda Pertamina Jakarta	51
Amartha Hangtuah	43
Third place
November 24
Satya Wacana Salatiga	65
Pelita Jaya Jakarta	82

==== Semi-finals ====
23 November 2019
Amartha Hangtuah	65–57	Satya Wacana Salatiga

23 November 2019
Pelita Jaya Jakarta	51–62	Satria Muda Pertamina Jakarta

==== 3rd–4th-place game ====
24 November 2019
Satya Wacana Salatiga	65–82	Pelita Jaya Jakarta

==== Final ====
24 November 2019
Satria Muda Pertamina Jakarta	51–43	Amartha Hangtuah

==== Individual awards ====
MVP	Club
(Indonesia) Arki Wisnu	Satria Muda Pertamina Jakarta

== Regular season ==
Pos	Team	W	L	Pld	Pts	Qualification
1	Indonesia Patriots*	11	2	13	24	
2	NSH Jakarta	10	4	14	24	Play-offs
3	Pelita Jaya Jakarta	10	3	13	23	Play-offs
4	Satria Muda Pertamina Jakarta	9	4	13	22	Play-offs
5	Louvre Surabaya	7	7	14	21	Play-offs
6	Pacific Caesar Surabaya	5	8	13	18	
7	Amartha Hangtuah	4	10	14	18	
8	Prawira Bandung	4	9	13	17	
9	Bimaperkasa Yogyakarta	3	10	13	16	
10	Satya Wacana Salatiga	3	9	12	15	

* Indonesia Patriots is the national team, so the team is not able qualified for the play-offs

== Championship Series ==
=== ~~First Round~~ ===
~~Pos~~	~~Team~~	~~W~~	~~L~~	~~Pld~~	~~Pts~~	~~Qualification~~
~~1~~	~~Pacific Caesar Surabaya~~					~~Play-offs~~
~~2~~	~~Amartha Hangtuah~~					~~Play-offs~~
~~3~~	~~Prawira Bandung~~					~~Play-offs~~
~~4~~	~~Bimaperkasa Yogyakarta~~					~~Play-offs~~
~~5~~	~~Satya Wacana Salatiga~~					

== Players of the Series ==
Local Players of the Series
Nationality	Name	Club	Series
Indonesia	Sandy Ibrahim	Satria Muda Pertamina Jakarta	Series I
Indonesia	Abraham Damar Grahita	Indonesia Patriots*	Series II
Indonesia	Daniel Wenas	Louvre Surabaya	Series III
Indonesia	Brandon Jawato	Indonesia Patriots*	Series IV

Rookie Players of the Series
Nationality	Name	Club	Series
Indonesia	Dio Tirta Saputra	Louvre Surabaya	Series I
Indonesia	Antoni Erga	Satya Wacana Salatiga	Series II
Indonesia	Rivaldo Tandra	Satria Muda Pertamina Jakarta	Series III
Indonesia	Antoni Erga (2)	Satya Wacana Salatiga	Series IV

Import Players of the Series
Nationality	Name	Club	Series
United States	Savon Goodman	Louvre Surabaya	Series I
United States	Taylor Statham	Pacific Caesar Surabaya	Series II
United States	Michael Edward Glover	NSH Jakarta	Series III
United States	Dior Lowhorn	Pelita Jaya	Series IV

== Statistics ==
=== Individual game highs ===
Name	Club	Category	Statistic
(United States) Laquavious Cotton	Amartha Hangtuah	Point	44
(United States) Charles Jackson Jr	Amartha Hangtuah	Assist	8
(United States) Dior Lowhorn	Pelita Jaya Bakrie	Rebounds	24
(Indonesia) Andre Adriano	Satya Wacana Salatiga	Steals	5
(United States) Hal Heyward	Satya Wacana Salatiga	Blocks	9
(United States) Christopher Sterling	Satya Wacana Salatiga	Three Pointers	6

=== Individual statistics ===
Points per game
Name	Club	PPG
(United States) Dior Lowhorn	Pelita Jaya Bakrie	28.33
(United States) Mike Glover	NSH Mountain Gold Timika	23.36
(United States) Savon Goodman	Louvre Surabaya	22.9
(United States) Laquavious Qotton	Amartha Hangtuah	22.7
(United States) (Dominican Republic) Luis Jacobo III	Pacific Caesar Surabaya	21.8

Rebounds per game
Name	Club	RPG
(United States) Dior Lowhorn	Pelita Jaya Bakrie	13.5
(Dominican Republic) (Indonesia) Lester Prosper	Indonesia Patriots	13.3
(United States) Savon Goodman	Louvre Surabaya	12.9
(United States) Hal Heyward	Satya Wacana Saints	12.8
(United States) David Samuels	Prawira Bandung	11.8

Assists per game
Name	Club	APG
(United States) Gary Jacobs Jr.	Satria Muda Pertamina	5.3
(Indonesia) Andakara Prastawa	Indonesia Patriots	4.8
(Indonesia) Widyanta Teja	NSH Jakarta	4.1
(United States) Kevin Bridgewaters	Pelita Jaya Bakrie	3.8
(United States) Dashaun Wiggins	NSH Jakarta	3.6

Steals per game
Name	Club	SPG
(United States) Leshirom Williams	Satya Wacana Saints	2.3

== Individual awards ==
Most Valuable Player : Abraham Damar Grahita (Indonesia Patriots)

Foreign Player of the Year : Mike Glover (NSH Jakarta)

Rookie of the Year : Rivaldo Tandra (Satria Muda Pertamina Jakarta)

Coach of the Year : Antonius Ferry Rinaldo (NSH Jakarta)

Defensive Player of the Year : Indra Muhamad (Pacific Caesar Surabaya)

Sixthman of the Year : Arki Wisnu (Indonesia Patriots)

Most Improve Player of the Year :Sandy Ibrahim Aziz (Satria Muda Pertamina Jakarta)

Best Referee of the Year :Harja Jaladri

2020 All-Indonesian First Team

1. G: Andakara Prastawa (Indonesia Patriots)
2. G: Abraham Damar Grahita (Indonesia Patriots)
3. F: Daniel Wenas (Louvre Surabaya)
4. F: Kaleb Gemilang (Indonesia Patriots)
5. C: Henry Cornelis Lakay (Satya Wacana Salatiga)

2020 All-Indonesian Second Team

1. G: Widyanta Putra Teja (NSH Jakarta)
2. G: Abraham Wenas (Amartha Hangtuah)
3. F: Sandy Ibrahim Aziz (Satria Muda Pertamina Jakarta)
4. F: Govinda Julian Saputra (Pelita Jaya Jakarta)
5. F: Arki Wisnu (Indonesia Patriots)

2020 All-Indonesian Third Team

1. G: Yerikho Tuasela (Pacific Caesar Surabaya)
2. G: Nuke Tri Saputra (Bima Perkasa Jogja)
3. F: Diftha Pratama (Prawira Bandung)
4. F: Indra Muhamad (Pacific Caesar Surabaya)
5. F: Juan Laurent Kokodiputra (Satria Muda Pertamina Jakarta)

2020 All-Indonesian Defensive Team

2020 All-Rookie Team

1. PG
2. SG
3. SF
4. SG/SF
5. C

== All-Star Games ==
=== Pre-game ===
Skill-challenge champion : (Indonesia) Team 4: Dimaz Muharri, Mei Joni, Antoni Erga

Three-point contest champion : (United States) Christopher V. Sterling | Satya Wacana Salatiga

Slam-dunk contest champion : (United States) Laquavious Kashaka Cotton | Amartha Hangtuah

=== Game ===
==== Indonesia Patriots ====
Pos	Name	Club	No. of selections
Starters
F	(Indonesia) Arki Dikania Wisnu	Indonesia Patriots	4
F	(Indonesia) Kaleb Ramot Gemilang	Indonesia Patriots	2
G	(Indonesia) Mei Joni	Indonesia Patriots	2
F	(Indonesia) Kevin Sitorus	Indonesia Patriots	2
C	(Dominican Republic) (Indonesia) Lester Prosper	Indonesia Patriots	1
Reserves
G	(Indonesia) Abraham Damar Grahita	Indonesia Patriots	2
F	(United States) (Indonesia) Brandon Jawato (Did Not Play)	Indonesia Patriots	1
G	(Indonesia) Hardianus Lakudu (Injury)	Indonesia Patriots	1
C	(Indonesia) Vincent Kosasih	Indonesia Patriots	1
G	(Indonesia) Andakara Prastawa	Indonesia Patriots	3
F	(Indonesia) Muhammad Hardian Wicaksono	Indonesia Patriots	1
F	(Indonesia) Laurentius Steven Oei	Indonesia Patriots	1
G	(Indonesia) David Nuban (Replaced)	Satya Wacana Salatiga	1
Coach
	(Serbia) Rajko Toroman	Indonesia Patriots	1

==== IBL All Star ====
Pos	Name	Club	No. of selections
Starters
G	(Indonesia) Nuke Tri Saputra	Bima Perkasa Yogyakarta	1
G	(United States) Montrell Williams	Satya Wacana Salatiga	1
C	(Indonesia) Galank Gunawan	Louvre Surabaya	1
G	(Indonesia) Respati Ragil	Pelita Jaya Jakarta	2
F	(United States) Laquavius Cotton	Amartha Hangtuah	1
Reserves
G	(Indonesia) Kelly Purwanto	Amartha Hangtuah	3
G	(United States) Gary Jacobs Jr	Satria Muda Pertamina Jakarta	2
F	(Indonesia) Daniel Wenas	Louvre Surabaya	2
C	(United States) Savon Goodman	Louvre Surabaya	2
C	(Indonesia) Adhi Pratama	Pelita Jaya Jakarta	3
Coach
	(Indonesia) Octaviarro Romely Tamtelahitu	Pelita Jaya Jakarta	1

February 9, 2020
4:00 pm WIB

Indonesia Patriots 102, IBL All Star 108
Scoring by quarter: 22–19, 21–32, 34–38, 25–19

GOR Amongrogo, Yogyakarta
Attendance: 2,000

==== All-Star MVP ====
Country	MVP	Team
(United States)	Savon Goodman	Louvre Surabaya

== Playoffs ==
=== MVP ===
not awarded
