= 2018–19 Indonesian Basketball League =

- League: Indonesian Basketball League
- Sport: Basketball
- Duration: 14–21 October 2018 (pre-season); 30 November – 17 February 2019 (regular season); 1–23 March 2019 (playoffs)
- TV partner(s): tvOne (Indonesia); Usee TV (Indonesia); Telkomsel (Indonesia) iflix (Indonesia); Laola1.TV (worldwide, exclude Indonesia)

2018 IBL Draft
- Top draft pick: Sabdayegra Ahessa
- Picked by: Bogor Siliwangi

Regular season
- Top seed: Stapac Jakarta
- Season MVP: Kaleb Ramot Gemilang
- Top scorer: Madarious Gibbs

Playoffs
- Finals champions: Stapac Jakarta
- Runners-up: Satria Muda Pertamina Jakarta
- Finals MVP: Savon Goodman

IBL Indonesia seasons
- ← 2018 2020 →

The 2018–19 Indonesian Basketball League was the fourth season of the Indonesian Basketball League with Starting5 as a promoter of the league. The regular season began on 30 November 2018 until 17 February 2019, with the Playoffs starting on 1 until 23 March 2019. The Pre-Season was held on 14 until 21 October 2018.

== Teams ==
| Teams | Head Coach | Captain | Home | City |
|---|---|---|---|---|
| Satya Wacana Salatiga | (Indonesia) Efri Meldi | (Indonesia) Andre Adriano | | Salatiga |
| Bimaperkasa Yogyakarta | (Indonesia) Raoul Miguel | (Indonesia) Yanuar Dwi Priasmoro | GOR UNY (3000) | Yogyakarta |
| Hangtuah Sumatera Selatan | (Indonesia) Andika Saputra | (Indonesia) Abraham Wenas | | Palembang |
| NSH Jakarta | (Indonesia) Wahyu Widayat Jati | (Indonesia) Wendha Wijaya | | Jakarta |
| Bogor Siliwangi | (Indonesia) Paul Mario Sanggor | (Indonesia) Teddy Apriyana Romadonsyah | | Bogor |
| Prawira Bandung | (Indonesia) Andre Yuwadi | (Indonesia) Diftha Pratama | C-Tra Arena (2,500) | Bandung |
| Pacific Caesar Surabaya | (Indonesia) Kencana Wukir | (Indonesia) Muhammad Hardian Wicaksono | DBL Arena, Surabaya(3,000) GOR Pacific Caesar (2,000) | Surabaya |
| Stapac Jakarta | (Lithuania) Giedrius Zibenas | (Indonesia) Oki Wira Sanjaya | | Jakarta |
| Pelita Jaya Jakarta | (Indonesia) Fictor Roring | (Indonesia) Xaverius Prawiro | Soemantri Brodjonegoro Stadium | Jakarta |
| Satria Muda Pertamina Jakarta | (Indonesia) Youbel Sondakh | (Indonesia) Arki Dikania Wisnu | Mahaka Square (4,000) | Jakarta |

== Schedule ==
| Phase | Round | Date | Arena |
|---|---|---|---|
| Pre-season | | 14–21 October 2018 | Sritex Arena, Solo |
| Regular season | Series I | 30 November – 2 December 2018 | GOR Sahabat, Semarang |
| Regular season | Series II | 7–9 December 2018 | Mahaka Square, Jakarta |
| Regular season | Series III | 14–16 December 2018 | GOR Merpati, Denpasar |
| Regular season | Series IV | 10–12 January 2019 | Sritex Arena, Solo |
| All Star | | 13 January 2019 | Sritex Arena, Solo |
| Regular season | Series V | 25–27 January 2019 | C-Tra Arena, Bandung |
| Regular season | Series VI | 1–3 February 2019 | GOR Pacific, Surabaya |
| Regular season | Series VII | 8–10 February 2019 | GOR Bimasakti, Malang |
| Regular season | Series VIII | 15–17 February 2019 | GOR UNY, Yogyakarta |
| Playoffs | First round | 1–2 March 2019 | Hi-Test Arena, Batam |
| Playoffs | Semi-finals | 8–10 March 2019 | Soemantri Brodjonegoro Indoor Stadium, Jakarta |
| Playoffs | Finals | 21 March 2019 | Mahaka Square, Jakarta |
| Playoffs | Finals | 23 and 24 March 2019 | C-Tra Arena, Bandung |

== Transactions ==
| Name | Old club | New club |
|---|---|---|
| (Indonesia) Andakara Prastawa | Stapac Jakarta | Pelita Jaya Jakarta |
| (Indonesia) Alkristian Chandra | Bimaperkasa Yogyakarta | Pelita Jaya Jakarta |
| (Indonesia) Kaleb Gemilang | CLS Knights Indonesia | Stapac Jakarta |
| (Indonesia) Galank Gunawan | Prawira Bandung | Bimaperkasa Yogyakarta |
| (Indonesia) Hengki Infandi | Prawira Bandung | NSH Jakarta |
| (Indonesia) Yogi Da Silva | Bimaperkasa Yogyakarta | Free Agent |
| (Indonesia) Nuke Tri Saputra | Pacific Caesar Surabaya | Free Agent |
| (Indonesia) Yan Steven Pattikawa | Hangtuah Sumatera Selatan | |
| (Indonesia) Riony Rahangmetan | Satya Wacana Salatiga | Prawira Bandung |
| (Indonesia) Fendi Yudha Pratama | Siliwangi Bandung | Prawira Bandung |
| (Indonesia) R. Azzaryan Pradhitya | Siliwangi Bandung | Bimaperkasa Yogyakarta |
| (Indonesia) Airlangga Sabara | Hangtuah Sumatera Selatan | Bimaperkasa Yogyakarta |
| (Indonesia) Muhammad Surya Jayadiwangsa | NSH Jakarta | Satria Muda Pertamina Jakarta |
| (Indonesia) Daniel Wenas | Pelita Jaya Jakarta | Siliwangi Bogor |
| (Indonesia) Andrey Rido Mahardika | Pelita Jaya Jakarta | Siliwangi Bogor |
| (Indonesia) Kelly Purwanto | Hangtuah Sumatera Selatan | Siliwangi Bogor |
| (Indonesia) Melki Sedek Basik | Bimaperkasa Yogyakarta | Siliwangi Bogor |

== Foreign Players ==
Each club in the first divisions will be allowed up to three registered foreign players, excluding one foreign-born player who has become a naturalized Indonesian citizen. Two foreign players will be allowed on the court. Naturalized players can play as Indonesian citizens and have no limitations. Each club will be allowed one naturalized player.

| Teams | Foreign 1 | Foreign 2 | Naturalization | Former Players |
|---|---|---|---|---|
| Satya Wacana Salatiga | (United States) Madarious Gibbs | (United States) Raymond Edward Miller Jr | | (United States) Ronald Whitaker |
| Bimaperkasa Yogyakarta | (United States) David Seagers | (United States) David Tanner Atkinson | | (United States) Zachary David Allman (United States) Leshaun Murphy |
| Hangtuah Sumatera Selatan | (United States) Martez Harrison | (United States) Jarad Lee Scott | | (United States) Gary Jacobs (United States) Bryquis Perine |
| NSH Jakarta | (United States) Anthony Simpson | (United States) Dashaun Wiggins | | |
| Bogor Siliwangi | (United States) Michael Vigilance Jr | (United States) Martavious Irving | | |
| Prawira Bandung | (United States) (Germany) Brachon Griffin | (United States) Dalarian Williams | | (United States) Jamal Ray |
| Pacific Caesar Surabaya | (United States) Qa'rraan Aleem Calhoun | (United States) Jjuan Hadnot | | (United States) Anthony Denell January (United States) Matthew Douglas van Pelt |
| Stapac Jakarta | (United States) Savon Goodman | (United States) Kendal Lee Yancy | | (United States) Jordin Mayes (United States) Keenan Allah Peterson |
| Pelita Jaya Energi Mega Persada | (United States) Carlton Hurst | (United States) Nate Barfield | | (United States) Wayne Bradford (United States) Kore White |
| Satria Muda Pertamina Jakarta | (United States) Dior Lowhorn | None | (United States) Jamarr Johnson | |

== IBL Draft Local Player ==
=== 1st round ===
| Round | Pick | Name | Pos | Age | High | Club | University |
|---|---|---|---|---|---|---|---|
| 1 | 1 | Sabdayegra Ahessa | F | 22 | 1.93 m | Siliwangi Bandung | University of Notre Dame Australia |
| 1 | 2 | Rizky Agung Pratana | G | 20 | 1.88 m | NSH Jakarta | STIE Bakti Pembangunan |
| 1 | – | PASS | | | | Bimaperkasa Yogyakarta | |
| 1 | 3 | Daniel Anggoro | G | 24 | 1.75 m | Satya Wacana Salatiga | Harapan Bangsa Institute of Technology |
| 1 | – | PASS | | | | Hangtuah Sumatera Selatan | |
| 1 | 5 | Ananda Syahputra Caesar | G | 23 | 1.81 m | Pacific Caesar Surabaya | Widyatama University |
| 1 | 6 | Irwanto | G | 21 | 1.80 m | Prawira Bandung | University Muhammadiyah Malang |
| 1 | – | PASS | | | | Stapac Jakarta | |
| 1 | – | PASS | | | | Satria Muda Pertamina Jakarta | |
| 1 | 7 | Muhammad Basit Ravi | G | 21 | 1.70 m | Pelita Jaya Energi Mega Persada | Perbanas Institute |

=== 2nd round ===
| Round | Pick | Name | Pos | Age | High | Club | University |
|---|---|---|---|---|---|---|---|
| 2 | 8 | Gustav Leopold | F | 29 | 1.83 m | Siliwangi Bandung | PSKD 1 High Schools |
| 2 | 9 | Dio Freedo | G | 21 | 1.73 m | NSH Jakarta | Ma Chung University |
| 2 | 10 | Faried Andy Brata | F | 22 | 1.88 m | Bimaperkasa Yogyakarta | University Muhammadiyah Malang |
| 2 | – | PASS | | | | Satya Wacana Salatiga | |
| 2 | 11 | Syechfi Nuzula Ramadhan | G | 24 | 1.70 m | Hangtuah Sumatera Selatan | Harapan Bangsa Institute of Technology |
| 2 | – | PASS | | | | Pacific Caesar Surabaya | |
| 2 | – | PASS | | | | Prawira Bandung | |
| 2 | 12 | Billal Al Naufal | F | 19 | 1.87 m | Stapac Jakarta | University Pendidikan Indonesia |
| 2 | 13 | Kelvin Tirta Sanjaya | G | 21 | 1.82 m | Satria Muda Pertamina Jakarta | Tarumanagara University |
| 2 | – | PASS | | | | Pelita Jaya Energi Mega Persada | |

=== Undrafted Players ===
| Name | Pos | Age | High | Club | University |
|---|---|---|---|---|---|
| Samuel Bennedick | G | 23 | 1.80 m | Bimaperkasa Yogyakarta | University Dharma Persada |
| Fernando Tanoto | F | 22 | 1.85 m | Stapac Jakarta | IBMT International University |

== Preseason ==
All games held in Sritex Arena, Solo

=== Preliminary round ===
All times are local (UTC+7).

=== Red Group ===
| Pos | Team | Pld | W | L | Pts | |
|---|---|---|---|---|---|---|
| 1 | Satria Muda Pertamina Jakarta | 4 | 4 | 0 | 8 | Advance to semi-finals |
| 2 | Prawira Bandung | 4 | 3 | 1 | 7 | Advance to semi-finals |
| 3 | NSH Jakarta | 4 | 2 | 2 | 6 | Classification round |
| 4 | Bogor Siliwangi | 4 | 1 | 3 | 5 | Classification round |
| 5 | Satya Wacana Salatiga | 4 | 0 | 4 | 4 | |

=== White Group ===
| Pos | Team | Pld | W | L | Pts | |
|---|---|---|---|---|---|---|
| 1 | Pelita Jaya Jakarta | 4 | 4 | 0 | 8 | Advance to semi-finals |
| 2 | Stapac Jakarta | 4 | 3 | 1 | 7 | Advance to semi-finals |
| 3 | Bimaperkasa Yogyakarta | 4 | 2 | 2 | 6 | Classification round |
| 4 | Pacific Caesar Surabaya | 4 | 1 | 3 | 5 | Classification round |
| 5 | Hangtuah Sumsel | 4 | 0 | 4 | 4 | |

=== Classification round ===
==== 7th–8th-place game ====
20 October 2018
| Bogor Siliwangi | 54–70 | Pacific Caesar Surabaya |

==== 5th–6th-place game ====
21 October 2018
| NSH Jakarta | 49–71 | Bimaperkasa Yogyakarta |

=== Finals round ===
Semi-finals
October 20
Prawira Bandung | 54
Pelita Jaya Jakarta | 80
October 20
Satria Muda Pertamina Jakarta | 63
Stapac Jakarta | 70

Final
October 21
Pelita Jaya Jakarta | 56
Stapac Jakarta | 62
Third place
October 21
Garuda Bandung | 60
Satria Muda Pertamina Jakarta | 79

==== Semi-finals ====
20 October 2018
| Prawira Bandung | 54–80 | Pelita Jaya Jakarta |

20 October 2018
| Satria Muda Pertamina Jakarta | 63–70 | Stapac Jakarta |

==== 3rd–4th-place game ====
21 October 2018
| Prawira Bandung | 60–79 | Satria Muda Pertamina Jakarta |

==== Final ====
| 21 October 2018 |
| Pelita Jaya Jakarta | 56–62 | Stapac Jakarta |

==== Individual awards ====
| MVP | Club |
|---|---|
| (Indonesia) Mei Joni | Stapac Jakarta |

== Regular season ==
All times are local (UTC+7).

=== Red Division ===
| Pos | Team | Pld | W | L | Pts | |
|---|---|---|---|---|---|---|
| 1 | NSH Jakarta | 18 | 12 | 6 | 30 | Advance to semi-finals |
| 2 | Bimaperkasa Yogyakarta | 18 | 11 | 7 | 29 | Play-off first round |
| 3 | Satria Muda Pertamina Jakarta | 18 | 9 | 9 | 27 | Play-off first round |
| 4 | Prawira Bandung | 18 | 8 | 10 | 26 | |
| 5 | Hangtuah Sumsel | 18 | 6 | 12 | 24 | |

=== White Division ===
| Pos | Team | Pld | W | L | Pts | |
|---|---|---|---|---|---|---|
| 1 | Stapac Jakarta | 18 | 17 | 1 | 35 | Advance to semi-finals |
| 2 | Pelita Jaya Jakarta | 18 | 11 | 7 | 29 | Play-off first round |
| 3 | Pacific Caesar Surabaya | 18 | 7 | 11 | 25 | Play-off first round |
| 4 | Bogor Siliwangi | 18 | 5 | 13 | 23 | |
| 5 | Satya Wacana Salatiga | 18 | 4 | 14 | 22 | |

== Statistics ==
=== Individual game highs ===
| Name | Club | Category | Statistic |
|---|---|---|---|
| (United States) Madarious Gibbs | Satya Wacana Salatiga | Point | 53 |
| (United States) Madarious Gibbs | Satya Wacana Salatiga | Assist | 15 |
| (United States) Raymond Miller Jr. | Satya Wacana Salatiga | Rebounds | 27 |
| (United States) Dashaun Wiggins | NSH Jakarta | Steals | 7 |
| (United States) Dalarian Williams | Prawira Bandung | Steals | 7 |
| (United States) Qa'rraan Calhoun | Pacific Caesar Surabaya | Blocks | 8 |
| (United States) Madarious Gibbs | Satya Wacana Salatiga | Three Pointers | 6 |
| (United States) Dashaun Wiggins | Prawira Bandung | Three Pointers | 6 |
| (United States) David Atkinson | Bima Perkasa Jogja | Three Pointers | 6 |

=== Individual statistic ===
Point Per Games
| Name | Club | PPG | Games |
|---|---|---|---|
| (United States) Madarious Gibbs | Satya Wacana Salatiga | 29.67 | 18 |
| (United States) David Atkinson | Bima Perkasa Jogja | 28.61 | 18 |
| (United States) Dior Lowhorn | Satria Muda Pertamina Jakarta | 28.00 | 18 |
| (United States) Dashaun Wiggings | NSH Jakarta | 23.00 | 18 |
| (United States) Gary Jacobs | Hangtuah Sumatera Selatan | 23.00 | 13 |

Rebounds Per Games
| Name | Club | RPG | Games |
|---|---|---|---|
| (United States) Michael Vigilance Jr. | Bogor Siliwangi | 18.71 | 17 |
| (United States) Raymond Miller Jr. | Satya Wacana Salatiga | 16.20 | 15 |
| (United States) Jarad Scott | Hangtuah Sumatera Selatan | 12.39 | 18 |
| (United States) Qa'rraan Calhoun | Pacific Caesar Surabaya | 12.23 | 17 |
| (United States) Anthony Simpson | NSH Jakarta | 11.67 | 18 |

Assists Per Games
| Name | Club | APG | Games |
|---|---|---|---|
| (United States) Matthew Van Pelt | Pacific Caesar Surabaya | 8.38 | 8 |
| (United States) Madarious Gibbs | Satya Wacana Salatiga | 7.39 | 18 |
| (United States) Brachon Griffin | Prawira Bandung | 7.09 | 11 |
| (United States) David Seagers | Bima Perkasa Jogja | 6.09 | 11 |
| (United States) Gary Jacobs | Hangtuah Sumatera Selatan | 5.38 | 13 |

Steals Per Games
| Name | Club | SPG | Games |
|---|---|---|---|
| (United States) Dashaun Wiggins | NSH Jakarta | 3.61 | 18 |
| (United States) Anthony Simpson | NSH Jakarta | 2.67 | 18 |
| (United States) David Atkinson | Bima Perkasa Jogja | 2.44 | 18 |
| (United States) Dalarian Williams | Prawira Bandung | 2.39 | 18 |
| (United States) David Seagers | Bima Perkasa Jogja | 2.27 | 11 |

== Individual awards ==
MVP Player : Kaleb Ramot Gemilang (Stapac Jakarta)

Foreign Player of the Year : Madarious Gibbs (Satya Wacana Salatiga)

Most Inspiration Young Player of the Year :

Rookie of the Year : Agassi Goantara (Stapac Jakarta)

Coach of the Year : Wahyu Widayat Jati (NSH Jakarta)

Defensive Player of the Year : Michael Vigilance Jr. (Bogor Siliwangi)

Sixthman of the Year : Abraham Damar Grahita (Stapac Jakarta)

Most Improve Player of the Year : Widyanta Putra Teja (Stapac Jakarta)

2018–19 All-Indonesian Team

1. Andre Rorimpandey PG (NSH Jakarta)
2. Abraham Damar Grahita SG (Stapac Jakarta)
3. Kaleb Ramot Gemilang SF (Stapac Jakarta)
4. Muhammad Hardian Wicaksono PF (Pacific Caesar Surabaya)
5. Yanuar Dwi Priasmoro C (Bima Perkasa Jogja)

2018–19 All-Rookie Team

1. Daniel Anggoro PG (Satya Wacana Salatiga)
2. Samuel Pelmelay SG (NSH Jakarta)
3. Agassi Goantara SF (Stapac Jakarta)
4. SG/SF ()
5. C ()

== All-Star Games ==
=== Pre-game ===
Skill-challenge champion : (Indonesia) Kaleb Ramot Gemilang (Stapac Jakarta)

Three-point contest champion : (Indonesia) Andakara Prastawa (Pelita Jaya)

Slam-dunk contest champion : (United States) Savon Goodman (Stapac Jakarta)

=== Game ===
==== Red Team ====
| Pos | Name | Club | No. of selections |
Starters
| G | (Indonesia) Abraham Wenas | Hangtuah Sumsel | 1 |
| G | (United States) (Indonesia) Jamarr Johnson | Satria Muda Pertamina Jakarta | 2 |
| F | (Indonesia) Arki Dikania Wisnu | Satria Muda Pertamina Jakarta | 3 |
| F | (Indonesia) Galank Gunawan | Bimaperkasa Yogyakarta | 1 |
| C | (United States) Dior Lowhorn | Satria Muda Pertamina Jakarta | 2 |
Reserves
| G | (United States) Gary Jacobs | Hangtuah Sumsel | 2 |
| F | (Indonesia) Yanuar Dwi Priasmoro | Bimaperkasa Yogyakarta | 2 |
| F/C | (Indonesia) Muhammad Reza Guntara | Prawira Bandung | 1 |
| F | (United States) Anthony Simpson | NSH Jakarta | 1 |
| G | (Indonesia) Hardianus Lakudu | Satria Muda Pertamina Jakarta | 2 |
Coach
| | (Indonesia) Wahyu Widayat Jati | NSH Jakarta | 1 |

==== White Team ====
| Pos | Name | Club | No. of selections |
Starters
| G | (United States) Madarious Gibbs | Satya Wacana Salatiga | 1 |
| G | (Indonesia) Andakara Prastawa | Pelita Jaya | 2 |
| F | (Indonesia) Abraham Damar Grahita | Stapac Jakarta | 3 |
| F | (United States) Kore White | Pelita Jaya | 1 |
| C | (Indonesia) Adhi Pratama | Pelita Jaya | 2 |
Reserves
| C | (United States) Savon Goodman | Stapac Jakarta | 1 |
| F | (Indonesia) Kaleb Ramot Gemilang | Stapac Jakarta | 1 |
| G | (Indonesia) Mei Joni | Stapac Jakarta | 1 |
| G | (United States) Wayne Bradford (Injury) | Pelita Jaya | 2 |
| G | (Indonesia) Kelly Purwanto | Bogor Siliwangi | 1 |
| G | (United States) Martavious Irving | Bogor Siliwangi | 1 |
Coach
| | (Lithuania) Giedrius Zibenas | Stapac Jakarta | 1 |

January 13, 2019
4:00 pm WIB

Team Red 109, Team White 112
Scoring by quarter: 25–30, 22–22, 26–38, 36–22

Sritex Arena, Solo
Attendance: 2,000

==== All-Star MVP ====
| Country | MVP | Team |
|---|---|---|
| (United States) | Savon Goodman | Stapac Jakarta |

== Playoffs ==
=== Bracket ===
The whole playoffs are in a best-of-three series.

First-round
(R2) Bima Perkasa Jogja | 0
(R3) Satria Muda Pertamina Jakarta | 2
(W2) Pelita Jaya Jakarta | 0
(W3) Pacific Caesar Surabaya | 2

Semi-finals
(R1) NSH Jakarta | 1
(R3) Satria Muda Pertamina Jakarta | 2
(W1) Stapac Jakarta | 2
(W3) Pacific Caesar Surabaya | 0

Finals
(R3) Satria Muda Pertamina Jakarta | 0
(W1) Stapac Jakarta | 2

=== First round ===
All games held from 1 and 2 March 2019, in Hi-Test Arena, Batam

==== Bima Perkasa Jogja vs. Satria Muda Pertamina Jakarta ====
1 March
08:00 pm

| Bima Perkasa Jogja | 69–81 | Satria Muda Pertamina Jakarta |
Scoring by quarter: 21–22, 12–17, 13–22, 23–20
| Pts: D. Seagers 23; Rebs: G. Gunawan 10; Asts: D. Seagers 7 | | Pts: D. Lowhorn 24; Rebs: J. Johnson 14; Asts: A. Dikania Wisnu 9 |
Satria Muda Pertamina Jakarta leads series, 1–0

2 March
06:00 pm

| Satria Muda Pertamina Jakarta | 85–76 | Bima Perkasa Jogja |
Scoring by quarter: 20–22, 17–16, 24–25, 24–13
| Pts: D. Lowhorn 26; Rebs: D. Lowhorn 11; Asts: A. Dikania Wisnu 7 | | Pts: D. Seagers 23; Rebs: D. Seagers 11; Asts: D. Seagers 10 |
Satria Muda Pertamina Jakarta wins series, 2–0

==== Pelita Jaya Jakarta vs. Pacific Caesar Surabaya ====
1 March
06:00 pm

| Pelita Jaya Jakarta | 67–68 | Pacific Caesar Surabaya |
Scoring by quarter: 19–20, 12–16, 16–18, 20–14
| Pts: N. Barfield 22; Rebs: N. Barfield 16; Asts: V. Wuwungan 6 | | Pts: Q. A. Calhoun 22; Rebs: J. Hadnot 12; Asts: J. Hadnot 8 |
Pacific Caesar Surabaya leads series, 1–0

2 March
08:00 pm

| Pacific Caesar Surabaya | 67–66 | Pelita Jaya Jakarta |
Scoring by quarter: 18–19, 15–16, 17–10, 17–21
| Pts: Q. A. Calhoun 20; Rebs: Q. A. Calhoun 16; Asts: J. Hadnot 5 | | Pts: N. Barfield, C. Hurst 17; Rebs: N. Barfield 16; Asts: M. Indarji, R. Mononimbar 3 |
Pacific Caesar Surabaya wins series, 2–0

=== Semi finals ===
All games held from 8 to 10 March 2019, in Soemantri Brodjonegoro Indoor Stadium, Jakarta

==== NSH Jakarta vs. Satria Muda Pertamina Jakarta ====
8 March
06:00 pm

| NSH Jakarta | 62–81 | Satria Muda Pertamina Jakarta |
Scoring by quarter: 25–23, 21–18, 6–19, 10–21
| Pts: D. Wiggins 26; Rebs: M. Irman 6 Asts: D. Wiggins 5 | | Pts: D. Lowhorn 28; Rebs: J. Johnson 12; Asts: H. Hardianus 6 |
Satria Muda Pertamina Jakarta leads series, 1–0

9 March
08:00 pm

| Satria Muda Pertamina Jakarta | 73–81 | NSH Jakarta |
Scoring by quarter: 16–29, 18–13, 14–20, 25–19
| Pts: D. Lowhorn 33; Rebs: D. Lowhorn 19; Asts: A. Dikania Wisnu, H. Hardianus 6 | | Pts: D. Wiggins 27; Rebs: D. Wiggins 11; Asts: M. Irman 7 |
Series tied, 1–1

10 March
06:00 pm

| NSH Jakarta | 48–72 | Satria Muda Pertamina Jakarta |
Scoring by quarter: 16–26, 7–14, 14–16, 11–16
| Pts: A. Simpson 11; Rebs: A. Simpson 13; Asts: D. Riansyah 6 | | Pts: A. Dikania Wisnu 15; Rebs: D. Lowhorn 8 Asts: H. Hardianus 6 |
Satria Muda Pertamina Jakarta wins series, 2–1

==== Stapac Jakarta vs. Pacific Caesar Surabaya ====
8 March
08:00 pm

| Stapac Jakarta | 87–66 | Pacific Caesar Surabaya |
Scoring by quarter: 20–22, 27–10, 24–11, 16–23
| Pts: S. Goodman 26; Rebs: S. Goodman 9 Asts: K. Gemilang, W. Teja 4 | | Pts: Q. A. Calhoun 27; Rebs: Q. A. Calhoun 13; Asts: J. Hadnot 3 |
Stapac Jakarta leads series, 1–0

9 March
06:00 pm

| Pacific Caesar Surabaya | 75–81 | Stapac Jakarta |
Scoring by quarter: 17–20, 21–21, 21–20, 16–20
| Pts: Q. A. Calhoun 34; Rebs: Q. A. Calhoun 18; Asts: A. Wismaya 4 | | Pts: K. Yancy 27; Rebs: K. Yancy, S. Goodman 10; Asts: K. Yancy, W. Teja 5 |
Stapac Jakarta wins series, 2–0

== Finals ==
=== Stapac Jakarta vs. Satria Muda Pertamina Jakarta ===
21 March
19.00

| Satria Muda Pertamina Jakarta | 68–79 | Stapac Jakarta |
Scoring by quarter: 18–21, 10–14, 11–19, 27–25
| Pts: H. Hardianus 17; Rebs: D. Lowhorn 15; Asts: A. Dikania Wisnu 2 | | Pts: S. Goodman 21; Rebs: S. Goodman 12; Asts: K. Yancy 7 |
Stapac Jakarta leads series, 1–0

Mahaka Square, Jakarta

23 March
18.00

| Stapac Jakarta | 74–56 | Satria Muda Pertamina Jakarta |
Scoring by quarter: 17–14, 11–14, 28–22, 18–6
| Pts: S. Goodman 20; Rebs: S. Goodman 19; Asts: A. Grahita 7 | | Pts: D. Lowhorn 25; Rebs: D. Lowhorn 20; Asts: H. Hardianus 5 |
Stapac Jakarta wins series, 2–0

C-Tra Arena, Bandung

=== Finals MVP ===
| MVP | Team |
|---|---|
| (United States) Savon Goodman | Stapac Jakarta |
