= 2021 Indonesian Basketball League =

2021 IBL Pertamax
- League: Indonesian Basketball League
- Sport: Basketball
- Duration: 10 March – 10 April 2021 (first phase); 23 May – 6 June 2021 (second phase)
- TV partner(s): TVRI (free-to-air); Usee Sports (IPTV); YouTube and Facebook (streaming)

2020 IBL Draft
- Top draft pick: Davide Simone Lavi
- Picked by: Bank BPD DIY Bima Perkasa

Regular season
- Top seed: Pelita Jaya
- Season MVP: Jamarr Johnson
- Top scorer: Jamarr Johnson

Playoffs
- Finals champions: Satria Muda Pertamina
- Runners-up: Pelita Jaya
- Finals MVP: Hardianus Lakudu

IBL Indonesia seasons
- ← 2020 2022 →

The 2021 Indonesian Basketball League (known as IBL Pertamax for sponsorship reasons) was the sixth season of the Indonesian Basketball League since the re-branding by Starting5. The regular season began on 10 March 2021 and was ended with the Finals in June 2021. In this season there would be no official preseason tournament and all-star games, while throughout the season would be played inside a bubble in Bogor and Jakarta due to the ongoing COVID-19 pandemic. In addition, every player, staff, and official must follow the strict health protocols implemented by the organizers.

== Schedule and location ==
| Phase | Round | Date | Arena |
|---|---|---|---|
| Pre-season | | before 10 March 2021 | Held independently by each team |
| First phase | Series I | 10-15 March 2021 | Robinson Cisarua Resort, Bogor (IBL Bubble) |
| First phase | Series II | 18-23 March 2021 | Robinson Cisarua Resort, Bogor (IBL Bubble) |
| First phase | Series III | 26-31 March 2021 | Robinson Cisarua Resort, Bogor (IBL Bubble) |
| First phase | Series IV | 5-10 April 2021 | Robinson Cisarua Resort, Bogor (IBL Bubble) |
| Second phase | Playoffs | 23 until 25 May 2021 | Mahaka Square (IBL Camp) |
| Second phase | Semi-finals | 27 until 29 May 2021 | Mahaka Square (IBL Camp) |
| Second phase | Finals (Best of three) | 3 until 4 or 6 June 2021 | Mahaka Square (IBL Camp) |

Locations of 2021 IBL season.
Red: Red Region; White: White Region; Blue: Camp and Bubble location;

=== Homebase ===
| Teams | Home | Club City |
|---|---|---|
| Amartha Hangtuah | Margasatwa Basketball Court | Jakarta |
| Bali United Basketball | GOR Praja Raksaka Kepaon | Denpasar |
| Bank BPD DIY Bima Perkasa | GOR Klebengan | Yogyakarta |
| Indonesia Patriots | Hall A Senayan | Jakarta |
| Louvre Dewa United | DBL Arena | Surabaya |
| NSH Mountain Gold | GOR MSC | Timika |
| Pacific Caesar | GOR Pacific Caesar | Surabaya |
| Pelita Jaya Bakrie | GOR Soemantri Brodjonegoro | Jakarta |
| Prawira | C-Tra Arena | Bandung |
| Satria Muda Pertamina | The BritAma Arena | Jakarta |
| Satya Wacana Saints | GOR Sahabat | Salatiga |
| West Bandit Chombiphar Solo | Sritex Arena | Solo |

== Teams ==
Twelve teams competing throughout the season - 8 teams from last season and 2 new teams joined from the expansion process.

=== New teams ===
- Bali United Basketball joined the league after being granted a IBL licence.
- West Bandits Solo also joined the league throughout the expansion process.

=== Name changes ===
- NSH Jakarta would be known as NSH Mountain Gold Timika from the 2021 season after merged with Mountain Gold Basketball Club.
- Louvre Surabaya would be known as Louvre Dewa United Surabaya from the 2021 season after being sponsored.
- Satya Wacana Basketball would be known as Satya Wacana Saints Salatiga from the 2021 season after being sponsored.

=== Personnel and Kits ===
| Teams | Manager | Head Coach | Captain | Kit manufacturer |
|---|---|---|---|---|
| Amartha Hangtuah | (Indonesia) Leonardo Niki | (Indonesia) Rastafari Horongbala | (Indonesia) Abraham Wenas | (Indonesia) Injers |
| Bali United Basketball | (Indonesia) Sigit Sugiantoro | (North Macedonia) Aleksandar Stefanovski | (Indonesia) Ponsianus Nyoman | (Indonesia) Mills |
| Bank BPD DIY Bima Perkasa | (Indonesia) Dyah Ayu Pratiwi | (United States) David R. Singleton | (Indonesia) Azzaryan Pradhitya | (Indonesia) Runster |
| Indonesia Patriots | (Indonesia) Andy Poedjakesuma | (Indonesia) Youbel Sondakh | (Indonesia) Muhammad Arighi | (Indonesia) Nuraga |
| Louvre Dewa United | (Indonesia) Giovanni Andrea | (Indonesia) Andika S. Saputra | (Indonesia) Kevin Moses Poetiray | (Indonesia) Motion |
| NSH Mountain Gold | (Indonesia) Yusuf Arlan Ruslim | (Indonesia) Antonius F. Rinaldo | (Indonesia) Randika Aprilian | (Indonesia) Injers |
| Pacific Caesar | (Indonesia) Ade Nopriansyah | (Indonesia) R. Aries Herman | (Indonesia) Aga Siedarta Wismaya | (Indonesia) Terra |
| Pelita Jaya Bakrie | (Indonesia) Nugroho Budi Cahyono | (Indonesia) Octaviarro R. Tamtelahitu | (Indonesia) Andakara Dhyaksa | (Indonesia) Injers |
| Prawira | (Indonesia) Syarel Hasan | (Indonesia) Andre Yuwadi | (Indonesia) Diftha Pratama | (Indonesia) Sportama |
| Satria Muda Pertamina | (Indonesia) Riska Natalia Dewi | (Serbia) Miloš Pejić | (Indonesia) Arki Wisnu | (China) Li-Ning |
| Satya Wacana Saints | (Indonesia) Zaki Iskandar | (Indonesia) Efri Meldi | (Indonesia) David Liberty Nuban | (Indonesia) A-Plus |
| West Bandits | (Indonesia) Cesar W.H. Christian | (Indonesia) Raoul M. Hadinoto | (Indonesia) Widyanta Putra Teja | (Indonesia) Rolo |

== Transactions ==
| Name | Old club | New club |
|---|---|---|
| (Indonesia) Sabdayagra Ahessa | Free agent | Amartha Hangtuah |
| (Indonesia) Oki Wira Sanjaya | Free agent | Amartha Hangtuah |
| (Indonesia) Daniel Wenas | Louvre Surabaya | Bali United Basketball |
| (Indonesia) Yerikho Tuasela | Pacific Caesar Surabaya | Bali United Basketball |
| (Indonesia) Ponsianus Nyoman Indrawan | Retired | Bali United Basketball |
| (Indonesia) Lutfi Eka Koswara | NSH Jakarta | Bali United Basketball |
| (Indonesia) Tri Hartanto | Pelita Jaya Bakrie | Bali United Basketball |
| (Indonesia) Surliyadin | Prawira Bandung | Bali United Basketball |
| (Indonesia) Yo Sua | CLS Knights | Bali United Basketball |
| (Indonesia) Rico Suharno Putra | CLS Knights | Bali United Basketball |
| (Indonesia) Galank Gunawan | Louvre Surabaya | Bank BPD DIY Bima Perkasa |
| (Indonesia) Indra Muhammad | Pacific Caesar Surabaya | Bank BPD DIY Bima Perkasa |
| (Indonesia) Isman Thoyib | Retired | Bank BPD DIY Bima Perkasa |
| (Indonesia) Rachmad Febri Utomo | CLS Knights | Bank BPD DIY Bima Perkasa |
| (Indonesia) Luca Rimba Lioteza | Amartha Hangtuah | Free agent |
| (Indonesia) Lucky Abdi Pasondok | Amartha Hangtuah | Free agent |
| (Indonesia) Aditya Reynaldi Rumanauw | Amartha Hangtuah | Free agent |
| (Indonesia) Vincent Sanjaya | Bank BPD DIY Bima Perkasa | Free agent |
| (Indonesia) Yanuar Dwi Priasmoro | Bank BPD DIY Bima Perkasa | Free agent |
| (Indonesia) Dimaz Muharri | Louvre Surabaya | Free agent |
| (Indonesia) Oki Indra Hidayat | Pacific Caesar Surabaya | Free agent |
| (Indonesia) Doni Ristanto | Pacific Caesar Surabaya | Free agent |
| (Indonesia) Dicky Satria Wibisono | Pacific Caesar Surabaya | Free agent |
| (Indonesia) Raja Anugerah | Pacific Caesar Surabaya | Free agent |
| (Indonesia) M. Basith Ravi | Pelita Jaya Bakrie | Free agent |
| (Indonesia) Fendi Yudha Pratama | Prawira Bandung | Free agent |
| (Indonesia) Alba Pedro | Prawira Bandung | Free agent |
| (Indonesia) Daniel Anggoro | Satya Wacana Salatiga | Free agent |
| (Indonesia) Reza Farid Azizi | Satya Wacana Salatiga | Free agent |
| (Senegal) Dame Diagne | Free agent | Indonesia Patriots |
| (Senegal) Serigne Modou Kane | Free agent | Indonesia Patriots |
| (Indonesia) Ikram Fadhil | CLS Knights | Indonesia Patriots |
| (Indonesia) (United States) Jamarr Johnson | Satria Muda Pertamina | Louvre Dewa United |
| (Indonesia) Sandy Febriansyakh | CLS Knights | Louvre Dewa United |
| (Indonesia) (Philippines) Ebrahim Enguio Lopez | (Philippines) Muntinlupa Cagers | NSH Mountain Gold |
| (Indonesia) Ruslan | Free agent | NSH Mountain Gold |
| (Indonesia) Melki Sedek | Bank BPD DIY Bima Perkasa | NSH Mountain Gold |
| (Indonesia) Muhammad Hardian Wicaksono | Indonesia Patriots | Pelita Jaya Bakrie |
| (Indonesia) Vincent Rivaldi Kosasih | Indonesia Patriots | Pelita Jaya Bakrie |
| (Indonesia) Agassi Goantara | (Spain) C.B. Alhama | Pelita Jaya Bakrie |
| (Indonesia) Andakara Prastawa | Indonesia Patriots | Pelita Jaya Bakrie |
| (Indonesia) Abraham Damar Grahita | Indonesia Patriots | Prawira Bandung |
| (Indonesia) Adhi Pratama | Pelita Jaya Bakrie | Retired |
| (Indonesia) Tengku Ryan Febriyan | NSH Jakarta | Retired |
| (Indonesia) Frida Aris Susanto | Bank BPD DIY Bima Perkasa | Retired |
| (Indonesia) Hardianus Lakudu | Indonesia Patriots | Satria Muda Pertamina |
| (Indonesia) Arki Wisnu | Indonesia Patriots | Satria Muda Pertamina |
| (Indonesia) Kevin Sitorus | Indonesia Patriots | Satria Muda Pertamina |
| (Indonesia) Laurentius Oei | Indonesia Patriots | Satria Muda Pertamina |
| (Indonesia) Andre Adrianno | Satya Wacana Salatiga | West Bandits Solo |
| (Indonesia) Cassiopeia Manuputty | Satya Wacana Salatiga | West Bandits Solo |
| (Indonesia) Widyanta Putra Teja | NSH Jakarta | West Bandits Solo |
| (Indonesia) Mei Joni | Indonesia Patriots | West Bandits Solo |
| (Indonesia) Fadlan Minallah | Satria Muda Pertamina | West Bandits Solo |
| (Indonesia) M. Alan As'adi | Bank BPD DIY Bima Perkasa | West Bandits Solo |
| (Indonesia) Pringgo Regowo | Retired | West Bandits Solo |
| (Indonesia) M. Saroni | CLS Knights | West Bandits Solo |

== IBL Draft Local Player ==
=== 1st round ===
| Round | Pick | Name | Pos | Age | Height | Club | Academy |
|---|---|---|---|---|---|---|---|
| 1 | 1 | David Simeone Lavi | SG | 26 | 1.78 m | Bank BPD DIY Bima Perkasa | (Indonesia) PB Kumala Jaya |
| 1 | 2 | Franciscus Bryan Prasetio | SG | 20 | 1.83 m | Satya Wacana Saints | (Indonesia) BMNL |
| 1 | 3 | M. Arief Febri Setiawan | G | 21 | 1.84 m | Satria Muda Pertamina | (Indonesia) Bogor |
| 1 | 4 | Rioga Deswara | PG | 23 | 1.73 m | West Bandits Solo | (Indonesia) West Bandits |
| 1 | 5 | I Putu Yudiantara | PF/C | 19 | 1.90 m | Bali United Basketball | (Indonesia) Elite Bali |
| 1 | 6 | Argus Sanyudy | C | 20 | 1.93 m | Amartha Hangtuah | (Indonesia) Gebbos |
| 1 | 7 | Richnel Rainders Loupatty | SF | 24 | 1.86 m | Louvre Dewa United | (Indonesia) Ambon |
| 1 | 8 | Teemo | PG | 22 | 1.73 m | Prawira Bandung | (Indonesia) Sutomo Alumni |
| 1 | 9 | Timotius Ray Sutanie | PG | 25 | 1,75 m | Pacific Caesar Surabaya | (Indonesia) Tunas Bandung |
| 1 | 10 | Abiyyu Ramadhan | PF/C | 22 | 1.96 m | Pelita Jaya Bakrie | (Indonesia) Scorpio Bogor |
| 1 | 11 | Achmad Jufri Abdu | SG | 22 | 1.83 m | NSH Mountain Gold | (Indonesia) Mountain Gold |

=== 2nd round ===
| Round | Pick | Name | Pos | Age | Height | Club | Academy |
|---|---|---|---|---|---|---|---|
| 1 | 1 | Ferdian Ravanelli | PF | 21 | 1.81 m | Bank BPD DIY Bima Perkasa | (Indonesia) Yogyakarta |
| 1 | 2 | Rian Sanjaya | SG | 22 | 1.78 m | Satya Wacana Saints | (Indonesia) PPKB |
| 1 | 3 | PASS | | | | Satria Muda Pertamina | |
| 1 | 4 | PASS | | | | West Bandits Solo | |
| 1 | 5 | PASS | | | | Bali United Basketball | |
| 1 | 6 | PASS | | | | Amartha Hangtuah | |
| 1 | 7 | PASS | | | | Louvre Dewa United | |
| 1 | 8 | PASS | | | | Prawira Bandung | |
| 1 | 9 | Calvin Chrissler | G | 22 | 1,75 m | Pacific Caesar Surabaya | (Indonesia) Prabumulih |
| 1 | 10 | Esha Ezra J. Lapian | PG | 19 | 1.90 m | Pelita Jaya Bakrie | (Indonesia) Ananda SC |
| 1 | 11 | Imanuel Onawame | PG | 20 | 1.65 m | NSH Mountain Gold | (Indonesia) Mountain Gold |

=== Recommended Player round ===
| Round | Pick | Name | Pos | Age | Height | Club | Academy |
|---|---|---|---|---|---|---|---|
| RP | Special | Samuel Devin | PF/C | 19 | 1.90 m | Bank BPD DIY Bima Perkasa | (Indonesia) Central Java |
| RP | Special | Randy Ady Prasetya | C | 23 | 2.02 m | Satya Wacana Saints | (Indonesia) Satya Wacana |
| RP | Special | Winston Swenjaya | PG | 21 | 1.75 m | Bali United Basketball | (Indonesia) Elite Bali |
| RP | Special | Andreas Kristian Vieri | PF/C | 21 | 1.90 m | Pacific Caesar Surabaya | (Indonesia) Surabaya |
| RP | Special | Agung Jaya Kusuma | C | 22 | 1.95 m | Pacific Caesar Surabaya | (Indonesia) Surabaya |
| RP | Special | Muhamad Arighi | PG/SG | 21 | 1.80 m | Pelita Jaya Bakrie | (Indonesia) South Kalimantan |
| RP | 1 | Avin Kurniawan | SF | 23 | 1.78 m | Bank BPD DIY Bima Perkasa | (Indonesia) SSS Yogyakarta |
| RP | 2 | Mas Kahono A.B. Firmansyah | C | 19 | 1.92 m | Satya Wacana Saints | (Indonesia) Satya Wacana |
| RP | 3 | Kelvin Sanjaya | PF/C | 20 | 1.99 m | Satria Muda Pertamina | (Indonesia) Hangtuah Pekanbaru |
| RP | 4 | Habib Tito Aji | SF | 22 | 1.87 m | West Bandits Solo | (Indonesia) Sahabat Semarang |
| RP | 5 | I.P.B. Arya Chandra Putra | SF | 21 | 1.85 m | Bali United Basketball | (Indonesia) Elite Bali |
| RP | 6 | N/A | | | | Amartha Hangtuah | |
| RP | 7 | N/A | | | | Louvre Dewa United | |
| RP | 8 | Yudha Saputera | PG | 22 | 1.68 m | Prawira Bandung | (Indonesia) GMC |
| RP | 9 | Gregorio Claude Wibowo | SF/PF | 25 | 1,82 m | Pacific Caesar Surabaya | (Indonesia) Sidoarjo |
| RP | 10 | Alfredo Tanujaya Julianto | PF/C | 22 | 1.94 m | Pelita Jaya Bakrie | (Indonesia) Rodatama |
| RP | 11 | Luis Jovan Anugerah Golung | PG | 19 | 1.75 m | NSH Mountain Gold | (Indonesia) Harlex |

== Regular season ==
=== Table ===
==== Red Division ====
| Pos | Team | Pld | W | L | PF | PA | PD | Pts | Qualification |
|---|---|---|---|---|---|---|---|---|---|
| 1 | Pelita Jaya Bakrie (Q) | 16 | 15 | 1 | 1233 | 972 | +261 | 31 | Advance to Semifinal |
| 2 | Louvre Dewa United (A) | 16 | 10 | 6 | 1134 | 1104 | +30 | 26 | Advance to Playoffs |
| 3 | Bank BPD DIY Bima Perkasa (A) | 16 | 9 | 7 | 1033 | 1014 | +19 | 25 | Advance to Playoffs |
| 4 | Bali United Basketball | 16 | 9 | 7 | 1165 | 1095 | +70 | 25 | |
| 5 | Satya Wacana Saints | 16 | 4 | 12 | 1083 | 1236 | −153 | 20 | |
| 6 | Pacific Caesar Surabaya | 16 | 1 | 15 | 846 | 1268 | −422 | 17 | |

Updated to match(es) played on 9 April 2021. Source: IBL Indonesia
(A) Advance to a further round; (Q) Qualified for the phase indicated

==== White Division ====
| Pos | Team | Pld | W | L | PF | PA | PD | Pts | Qualification |
|---|---|---|---|---|---|---|---|---|---|
| 1 | Satria Muda Pertamina (Q) | 16 | 14 | 2 | 1177 | 904 | +273 | 30 | Advance to Semifinal |
| 2 | Prawira Bandung (A) | 16 | 10 | 6 | 1159 | 1078 | +81 | 26 | Advance to Playoffs |
| 3 | Indonesia Patriots | 16 | 10 | 6 | 1146 | 1076 | +70 | 26 | |
| 4 | West Bandits Solo (A) | 16 | 8 | 8 | 1121 | 1095 | +26 | 24 | Advance to Playoffs |
| 5 | NSH Mountain Gold | 16 | 4 | 12 | 1005 | 1143 | −138 | 20 | |
| 6 | Amartha Hangtuah | 16 | 2 | 14 | 1074 | 1200 | −126 | 18 | |

Updated to match(es) played on 9 April 2021. Source: IBL Indonesia
(A) Advance to a further round; (Q) Qualified for the phase indicated

=== Results ===
| Home \ Away | AHT | BBC | BPJ | INA | LDU | NMG | PCC | PJB | PWR | SMP | SWS | WBS |
|---|---|---|---|---|---|---|---|---|---|---|---|---|
| Amartha Hangtuah | — | | | 60–70 | | 62–64 | | 58–63 | 77–82 | 62–84 | 99–104 | 52–75 |
| Bali United Basketball | 75–67 | — | 75–70 | 77–89 | 77–65 | 78–74 | 75–47 | 64–75 | | 55–59 | 78–71 | |
| Bank BPD DIY Bima Perkasa | 69–64 | 61–53 | — | | 57–52 | | 71–45 | 56–75 | | 70–76 | 69–60 | 71–86 |
| Indonesia Patriots | 84–57 | | 74–62 | — | 68–74 | 78–68 | 77–46 | | 78–73 | 66–70 | | 73–60 |
| Louvre Dewa United | 81–74 | 86–76 | 59–66 | | — | | 80–60 | 70–77 | 73–61 | | 83–69 | 80–82 |
| NSH Mountain Gold | 71–73 | | 66–70 | 44–55 | 62–68 | — | 57–59 | | 64–58 | 47–74 | | 56–85 |
| Pacific Caesar Surabaya | 58–90 | 45–87 | 53–69 | | 52–82 | | — | 69–94 | | 36–84 | 56–64 | 60–83 |
| Pelita Jaya Bakrie | | 83–73 | 71–63 | 75–70 | 100–45 | 100–73 | 80–49 | — | 81–79 | | 105–69 | 88–67 |
| Prawira | 86–73 | 67–66 | 44–50 | 85–75 | | 75–56 | 97–56 | | — | 57–74 | 88–55 | 66–69 |
| Satria Muda Pertamina | 73–50 | | | 82–51 | 64–68 | 80–57 | | 76–54 | 72–73 | — | 78–56 | 61–54 |
| Satya Wacana Saints | | 68–83 | 61–59 | 73–74 | 59–68 | 56–70 | 78–55 | 61–89 | | | — | |
| West Bandits | 61–56 | 68–73 | | 70–64 | | 72–76 | | | 62–65 | 48–70 | 82–79 | — |

Updated to match(es) played on 9 April 2021. Source: IBL Indonesia
Legend: Blue = home team win; Red = away team win.

== Play-offs ==
The whole playoffs are in a best-of-three series.

First-round
(R2) Louvre Dewa United Surabaya | 2
(R3) Bank BPD DIY Bima Perkasa | 1
(W2) Prawira Bandung | 1
(W4) West Bandits Solo | 2

Semi-finals
(R1) Pelita Jaya Bakrie Jakarta | 2
(R2) Louvre Dewa United Surabaya | 0
(W1) Satria Muda Pertamina Jakarta | 2
(W4) West Bandits Solo | 0

Finals
(R1) Pelita Jaya Bakrie Jakarta | 1
(W1) Satria Muda Pertamina Jakarta | 2

=== First round ===
All games held from 23 May until 6 June 2021, in The BritAma Arena, North Jakarta

==== Louvre Dewa United Surabaya vs. Bank BPD DIY Bima Perkasa ====
23 May
03:45 pm

| Louvre Dewa United Surabaya | 63–79 | Bank BPD DIY Bima Perkasa |
Scoring by quarter: 5–26, 17–20, 19–18, 22–15
| Pts: J. Johnson 21; Rebs: J. Johnson 13; Asts: W. Wijaya 3 | | Pts: I. Muhammad 25; Rebs: G. Gunawan 13; Asts: R. Utomo 5 |
Bank BPD DIY Bima Perkasa leads series, 1–0

24 May
07:00 pm

| Bank BPD DIY Bima Perkasa | 63–67 () | Louvre Dewa United Surabaya |
Scoring by quarter: 24–13, 14–20, 18–12, 2–13, Overtime: 5-9
| Pts: R. Pradhitya 18; Rebs: G. Gunawan 23; Asts: R. Purnomo 3 | | Pts: J. Johnson 19; Rebs: J. Johnson 23; Asts: K. Poetiray 5 |
series tied, 1–1

25 May
04:00 pm

| Louvre Dewa United Surabaya | 67–56 | Bank BPD DIY Bima Perkasa |
Scoring by quarter: 19–13, 18–13, 12–24, 18–6
| Pts: J. Johnson 20; Rebs: J. Johnson 9 Asts: J. Johnson 5 | | Pts: R. Pradhitya 13; Rebs: G. Gunawan 11; Asts: R. Pradhitya 3 |
Louvre Dewa United Surabaya leads series, 2–1

=== Prawira Bandung vs. West Bandits Solo ===
23 May
07:00 pm

| Prawira Bandung | 85–68 | West Bandits Solo |
Scoring by quarter: 20–11, 19–21, 24–14, 22–22
| Pts: A. Grahita 28; Rebs: P. Wiguna 8 Asts: A. Hidayat 7 | | Pts: W. Teja 6 Rebs: H. Aji 5 Asts: W. Teja 5 |
Prawira Bandung leads series, 1–0

24 May
04:00 pm

| West Bandits Solo | 79–69 | Prawira Bandung |
Scoring by quarter: 21–20, 26–14, 14–19, 18–16
| Pts: H. Aji 21; Rebs: H. Aji 7 Asts: C. Manuputty 5 | | Pts: A. Hidayat 15; Rebs: A. Grahita 6 Asts: J. Kuntara 5 |
series tied, 1–1

25 May
07:00 pm

| Prawira Bandung | 70–80 | West Bandits Solo |
Scoring by quarter: 7–21, 20–18, 22–20, 21–21
| Pts: A. Grahita 26; Rebs: D. Pratama 8 Asts: A. Hidayat 4 | | Pts: P. Nikolas 17; Rebs: P. Nikolas 10; Asts: W. Teja 6 |
West Bandits Solo leads series, 2–1

== Statistics ==
=== Individual statistic ===
Point Per Games
| Name | Club | PPG | Games |
|---|---|---|---|
| (Indonesia) Jamarr Johnson | Louvre Dewa United | 20.21 | 15 |
| (Indonesia) Kevin Moses Poetiray | Louvre Dewa United | 16.56 | 16 |
| (Indonesia) Abraham Damar Grahita | Prawira Bandung | 15.88 | 16 |
| (Indonesia) Yerikho Christphor Tuasela | Bali United Basketball | 15.31 | 16 |
| (Indonesia) Azzaryan Pradhitya | Bank BPD DIY Bima Perkasa | 14.86 | 14 |

Rebounds Per Games
| Name | Club | RPG | Games |
|---|---|---|---|
| (Indonesia) Jamarr Johnson | Louvre Dewa United | 11.93 | 15 |
| (Indonesia) Bryan Adha Praditya | Satya Wacana Saints | 8.87 | 16 |
| (Indonesia) Surliyadin | Bali United Basketball | 8.86 | 16 |
| (Indonesia) Ponsianus Nyoman Indrawan | Bali United Basketball | 7.94 | 16 |
| (Indonesia) Yonatan Yonatan | Pacific Caesar Surabaya | 7.56 | 16 |

Assists Per Games
| Name | Club | APG | Games |
|---|---|---|---|
| (Indonesia) Widyanta Putra Teja | West Bandits Solo | 5.63 | 16 |
| (Indonesia) Yudha Saputera | Indonesia Patriots | 4.67 | 15 |
| (Indonesia) Hardianus Lakudu | Satria Muda Pertamina Jakarta | 4.67 | 16 |
| (Indonesia) Andakara Prastawa | Pelita Jaya Bakrie | 4.53 | 15 |
| (Indonesia) Jan Misael Panagan | NSH Mountain Gold | 4.50 | 16 |

Steals Per Games
| Name | Club | SPG | Games |
|---|---|---|---|
| (Indonesia) Andakara Prastawa | Pelita Jaya Bakrie | 2.73 | 16 |
| (Indonesia) Andre Rorimpandey | NSH Mountain Gold | 2.29 | 14 |
| (Indonesia) Yudha Saputera | Indonesia Patriots | 2.00 | 15 |
| (Indonesia) Indra Muhammad | Bank BPD DIY Bima Perkasa | 1.94 | 16 |
| (Indonesia) Azzaryan Pradhitya | Bank BPD DIY Bima Perkasa | 1.93 | 14 |

Blocks Per Games
| Name | Club | BPG | Games |
|---|---|---|---|
| (Indonesia) Jamarr Johnson | Louvre Dewa United | 1.50 | 15 |
| (Indonesia) Kelvin Sanjaya | Indonesia Patriots | 1.47 | 16 |
| (Indonesia) Ruslan Ruslan | NSH Mountain Gold | 1.40 | 10 |
| (Indonesia) Bryan Adha Praditya | Satya Wacana Saints | 1.33 | 16 |
| (Indonesia) Vincent Rivaldi Kosasih | Pelita Jaya Bakrie Jakarta | 1.33 | 15 |

== Individual awards ==
Most Valuable Player : Jamarr Johnson, (Louvre Surabaya)

Foreign Player of the Year : None

Rookie of the Year : Samuel Devin Susanto, (Bank BPD DIY Bima Perkasa)

Coach of the Year : David Singleton, (Bank BPD DIY Bima Perkasa)

Defensive Player of the Year : Jamarr Johnson, (Louvre Surabaya)

Sixthman of the Year : Andre Adriano, (West Bandits Solo)

Most Improve Player of the Year : Kevin Moses Poetiray, (Louvre Surabaya)

Most Inspiring Young Player : Yudha Saputera, (Indonesia Patriots)

Best Referee of the Year : Sedyo Mukti Wibowo

Best Waterboy of the Year : Kherubine Mercurio

2021 All-Indonesian First Team

1. G: Azzaryan Pradhitya (Bank BPD DIY Bima Perkasa)
2. G: Abraham Damar Grahita (Prawira Bandung)
3. F: Arki Wisnu (Satria Muda Pertamina Jakarta)
4. F: Jamarr Johnson (Louvre Surabaya)
5. C: Ponsianus Indrawan (Bali United)

2021 All-Indonesian Second Team

1. G: Andakara Prastawa ( Pelita Jaya Bakrie)
2. G: Agassi Goantara ( Pelita Jaya Bakrie)
3. F: Juan Laurent (Satria Muda Pertamina Jakarta)
4. F: Laurentius Oei (Satria Muda Pertamina Jakarta)
5. C: Surliyadin (Bali United)

2022 All-Indonesian First Defensive Team

1. F: Jamarr Johnson (Louvre Surabaya)
2. C: Ponsianus Indrawan (Bali United)
3. F: Surliyadin (Bali United)
4. F: Sandy Ibrahim Aziz (Satria Muda Pertamina)
5. F: Indra Muhamad (Bank BPD DIY Bima Perkasa)

2022 All-Indonesian Second Defensive Team

1. G: Widyanta Putra Teja (West Bandits Solo)
2. G: Andakara Prastawa ( Pelita Jaya Bakrie)
3. F: Ali Mustofa (Bank BPD DIY Bima Perkasa)
4. F: Laurentinus Oei (Satria Muda Pertamina)
5. C: Vincent Rivaldi Kosasih ( Pelita Jaya Bakrie)

2021 All-Rookie Team

1. G: Yudha Saputera (Indonesia Patriots)
2. G: Muhamad Arighi (Indonesia Patriots)
3. F: Ali Bagir (Indonesia Patriots)
4. F: Aldy Izzatur (Indonesia Patriots)
5. C: Kelvin Sanjaya (Indonesia Patriots)

== Finals ==
=== Finals MVP ===
| MVP | Team |
|---|---|
| (Indonesia) Hardianus Lakudu | Satria Muda Pertamina |
