= List of IBL Indonesia annual scoring leaders =

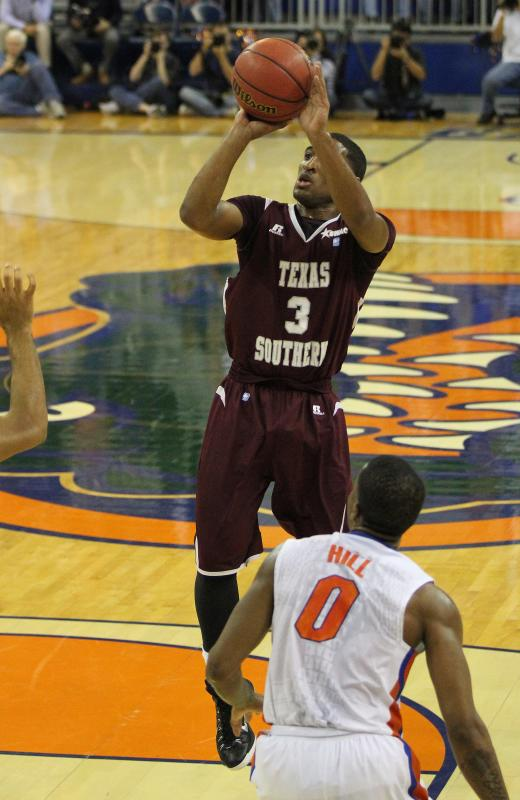
Madarious Gibbs won the award in 2019 and 2018

The Indonesian Basketball League (IBL) scoring champion title is awarded to the player with the highest points per game average in a given season.

== Scoring leaders ==
Season	League	Name	Club	PPG
2011	NBL	(Indonesia) Ary Chandra	Pelita Jaya Energi Mega Persada	14.1
2012	NBL	(Indonesia) Yanuar Dwi Priasmoro	Bimasakti Nikko Steel Malang	17.3
2013	NBL	(Indonesia) Bima Riski Ardiansyah	Bimasakti Nikko Steel Malang	16.5
2014	NBL	(Indonesia) Merio Ferdiansyah	Stadium Jakarta	18.1
2015	NBL	(Indonesia) Respati Ragil	Satya Wacana Salatiga	19.5
2016	IBL	(United States) (Indonesia) Jamarr Johnson	CLS Knights Surabaya	15.2
2017	IBL	(United States) Gary Jacobs Jr.	NSH Jakarta	27.5
2018	IBL	(United States) Madarious Gibbs	Satya Wacana Salatiga	27.1
2019	IBL	(United States) Madarious Gibbs	Satya Wacana Salatiga	29.7
2020	IBL	(United States) Dior Lowhorn	Pelita Jaya Bakrie	28.3
2021	IBL	(United States) (Indonesia) Jamarr Johnson	Louvre Dewa United	20.2
2022	IBL	(United States) Tyree Robinson	Satya Wacana Saints	21.5
2023	IBL	(United States) Ronnie Boyce III	Amartha Hangtuah	24.1
2024	IBL	(United States) Michael Qualls	Borneo Hornbills	27.1
2025	IBL	(United States) Quintin Dove	Rajawali Medan	29.2
2026	IBL	(United States) (Dominican Republic) AJ Bramah	Pacific Caesar	30.3
