= Vincent Rivaldi Kosasih =

Indonesian basketball player

Vincent Kosasih
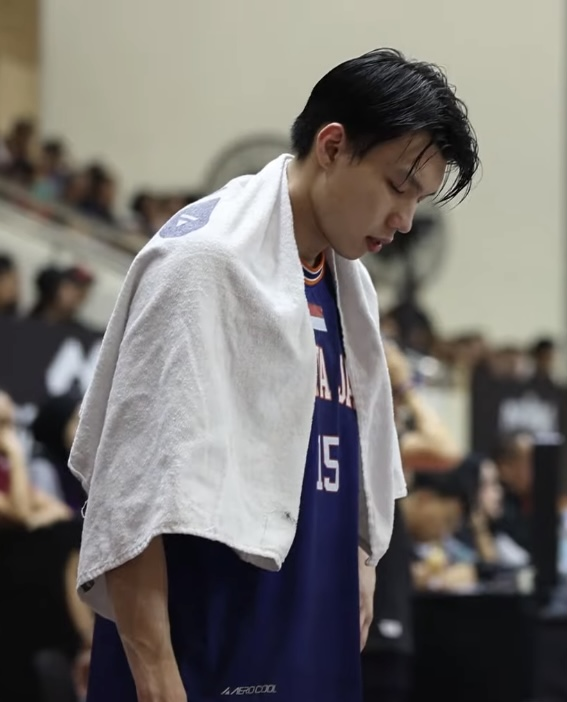
- Kosasih with Pelita Jaya in 2024

No. 15 – Pelita Jaya
- Position: Center / power forward
- League: IBL

Personal information
- Born: 17 June 1996 (age 30) Madiun, Indonesia
- Listed height: 201 cm (6 ft 7 in)
- Listed weight: 100 kg (220 lb)

Career information
- High school: BPK Penabur (Jakarta, Indonesia)
- College: Zhejiang University of Science and Technology
- Playing career: 2016–present

Career history
- 2016–2019: Aspac/Stapac Jakarta
- 2020–2021: Indonesia Patriots
- 2021–present: Pelita Jaya

Career highlights
- 2× IBL champion (2019, 2024); 6× IBL All-Star (2020, 2022-2026); IBL Indonesia Cup champion (2022); All-IBL Indonesian First Team (2022); All-IBL Indonesian First Defensive Team (2022); All-IBL Indonesian Second Defensive Team (2021)
Medals
Men's basketball
Representing Indonesia
SEA Games
Gold medal – first place	2021 Vietnam	Team
Silver medal – second place	2017 Kuala Lumpur	Team
SEABA Under-18 Championship
Silver medal – second place	2012 Singapore	Team
SEABA Under-16 Championship
Bronze medal – third place	2011 Banting	Team

Vincent Rivaldi Kosasih (born June 17, 1996) is an Indonesian professional basketball player who plays for the Pelita Jaya Bakrie of the Indonesian Basketball League (IBL) and is the main center for the Indonesia national team.

== Early and personal life ==
Born in Madiun, Kosasih grew up in Surabaya. His dad, Lie Tjuk Tek was a center for the Indonesia National Team. And his mom, Tjinggawati Halim was also an Indonesia National Team player for the 1987 SEA Games, his brother William is also a basketball player playing for Rajawali Medan. Later on he moved to Jakarta while he attended high school. Afterwards, he continued his studies abroad at the Zhejiang University of Science and Technology located in Hangzhou, Zhejiang, China. He finished his studies there in 2017.

Kosasih is married to Nita Vior, the brand ambassador of ONIC Esports.

== Club career ==
Vincent Kosasih started out his professional career with Satria Muda where he was roommate with Christian Sitepu. Kosasih recalls that Sitepu provided him with much valuable input.

In 2016, Kosasih joined Stapac Jakarta where he stayed until 2019.

In his two matches at the 2017 IBL Indonesia, Vincent averaged 6.5 points, 7 rebounds and 1 block in around 11 minutes per game.

In early 2021, he signed with his former club's local competitor Pelita Jaya Bakrie Jakarta to replace Adhi Pratama who retired.

== National team ==
Vincent Kosasih suited up for both Indonesia men's national under-16 basketball team and Indonesia men's national under-18 basketball team. He was part of the youth national team squads which appeared at the 2011 SEABA Under-16 Championship in Banting, Malaysia and 2012 SEABA Under-18 Championship in Singapore. Then he also appeared at the 2012 FIBA Asia Under-18 Championship in Ulan Bator, Mongolia.

He was a member of the Indonesian national basketball team squad that won the silver medal at the 2017 Southeast Asian Games. He joined the team after Adhi Pratama and Kristian Liem had to withdraw due to injury. He became one of the few Indonesian Centers (and forwards) available for the national team.

== Player profile ==
Kosasih's game has been influenced by several coaches from Eastern Europe. When he and Stapac won the 2019 IBL, he was coached by the Lithuanian Giedrius Žibėnas aka Coach Ghibi. Then in 2020 he joined the Indonesian national team and was trained by the Serbian coach Rajko Toroman.

Wahyu Widayat Jati, 2017 head coach of Indonesia's national team stated that he values Kosasih's defense and rebounding ability.

== Career statistics ==
Legend
GP	Games played	GS	Games started	MPG	Minutes per game
FG%	Field goal percentage	3P%	3-point field goal percentage	FT%	Free throw percentage
RPG	Rebounds per game	APG	Assists per game	SPG	Steals per game
BPG	Blocks per game	PPG	Points per game	**Bold**	Career high

†	Denotes seasons in which Grahita won an IBL championship
*	Led the league

=== IBL ===
==== Regular season ====
Years	Teams	GP	Min	FG%	3P%	FT%	APG	RPG	SPG	BPG	PPG
2016-17	Aspac Jakarta	2	10.9	**60.0**	0.0	**100.0**	0.0	7.0	0.0	1.0	6.5
2017-18	Stapac Jakarta	9	21.5	43.9	0.0	51.9	0.4	5.0	0.4	1.1	6.8
2018-19	Stapac Jakarta	9	9.4	34.7	0.0	49.4	0.1	2.8	0.5	0.3	2.2
2019-20	Indonesia Patriots	12	7.4	52.1	0.0	29.3	0.1	2.6	0.1	0.5	2.1
2020-21	Pelita Jaya	15	**22.2**	57.2	0.0	66.9	**0.9**	**7.8**	**0.6**	**1.4**	**8.9**
2021-22	Pelita Jaya	**21**	19.4	44.9	0.0	59.2	0.8	6.2	0.5	1.0	4.4

==== Playoffs ====
Years	Teams	GP	Min	FG%	3P%	FT%	APG	RPG	SPG	BPG	PPG
2018	Stapac Jakarta	3	**26.9**	30.4	**50.0**	50.0	0.7	6.5	0.7	0.5	5.6
2019	Stapac Jakarta	3	7.2	50.0	0.0	49.2	0.3	2.0	0.0	0.0	1.0
2021	Pelita Jaya	5	26.8	**57.5**	0.0	**63.6**	0.6	**9.0**	0.6	0.6	**10.4**
2022	Pelita Jaya	**7**	18.7	52.0	0.0	55.0	**0.8**	5.4	**1.5**	**0.8**	5.1
