= Kaleb Ramot Gemilang =

Indonesian basketball player

Kaleb Gemilang
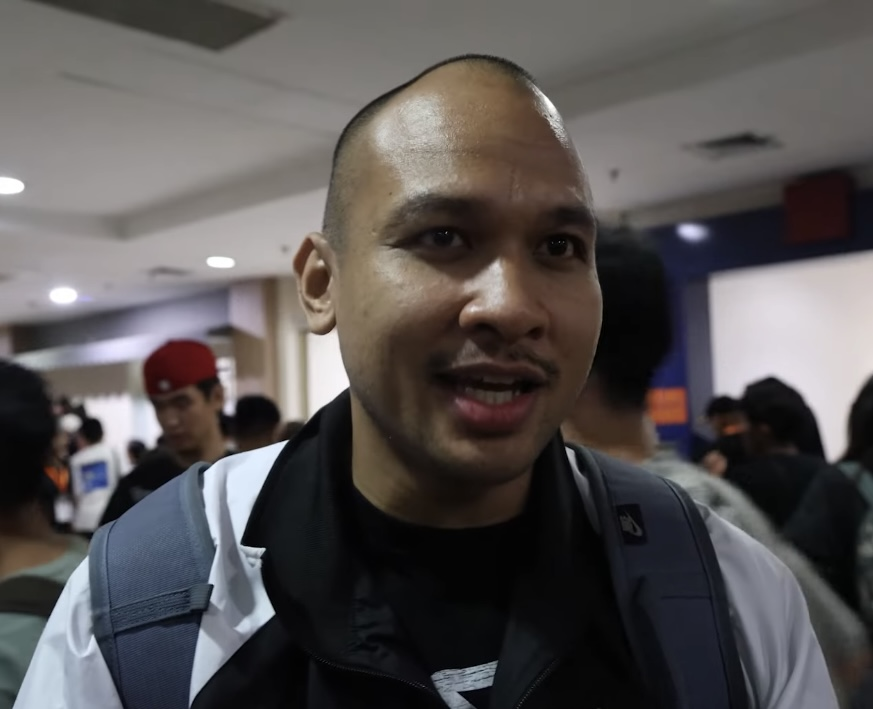
- Gemilang in 2024

No. 13 – Dewa United Banten
- Position: Small forward / shooting guard
- League: IBL

Personal information
- Born: 30 May 1991 (age 35) Bandung, Indonesia
- Listed height: 183 cm (6 ft 0 in)
- Listed weight: 93 kg (205 lb)

Career information
- High school: SMAN 9 (Bandung, Indonesia)
- College: ITHB (2009–2014) Narotama (2015-2018)
- Playing career: 2013–present

Career history
- 2013–2014: Satya Wacana Salatiga
- 2015–2018: CLS Knights Indonesia
- 2018–2021: Stapac Jakarta
- 2020–2021: Indonesia Patriots
- 2022–Present: Dewa United Banten

Career highlights
- 3× IBL champion (2016, 2019, 2025); 2× IBL Most Valuable Player (2019, 2023); All-IBL Second Team (2025); 5× All-IBL Indonesian First Team (2019, 2022-2025); 6× IBL All-Star (2019, 2020, 2022-2025); IBL Skill-challenge champion (2019)

Kaleb Ramot Gemilang (born May 30, 1991), is an Indonesian professional basketball player for the Dewa United Banten club of the Indonesian Basketball League (IBL). During his time with the CLS Knights, he was part of the Indonesian Basketball League Championship team of 2016. Nicknamed"Mr 100 Percent" due to his every shot decision being correct.

He has been a member of Indonesia's national basketball team at several occasions.

== Career statistics ==
Legend
GP	Games played	GS	Games started	MPG	Minutes per game
FG%	Field goal percentage	3P%	3-point field goal percentage	FT%	Free throw percentage
RPG	Rebounds per game	APG	Assists per game	SPG	Steals per game
BPG	Blocks per game	PPG	Points per game	**Bold**	Career high

†	Denotes seasons in which Gemilang won an IBL championship
*	Led the league

=== NBL/IBL ===
==== Regular season ====
Year	Team	GP	MPG	FG%	3P%	FT%	RPG	APG	SPG	BPG	PPG
2013-14	Satya Wacana Salatiga	13	-	44.9	30.0	63.1	**7.4**	**2.1**	**2.1**	**0.9**	14.4
2014-15	CLS Knights Surabaya	31	-	49.6	29.4	68.1	2.8	0.9	0.8	0.2	5.2
2015-16	CLS Knights Surabaya	**33**	18.2	51.0	37.0	55.0	4.9	1.1	0.8	0.4	8.0
2016-17	CLS Knights Surabaya	13	14.2	45.0	38.0	86.0	3.5	1.6	0.5	0.1	7.6
2018-19	Stapac Jakarta	16	27.4	56.0	**46.0**	81.0	4.4	1.4	1.1	0.2	12.7
2019-20	Indonesia Patriots	13	21.2	**59.2**	42.4	**100.0**	2.8	1.6	0.3	0.0	8.1
2021-22	Dewa United Surabaya	22	**31.2**	47.3	38.0	80.0	5.4	1.7	1.1	0.1	**15.5**

==== Playoffs ====
Year	Team	GP	MPG	FG%	3P%	FT%	RPG	APG	SPG	BPG	PPG
2015	CLS Knights Surabaya	**6**	-	30.7	0.0	60.0	2.8	0.8	0.1	0.0	1.8
2016	CLS Knights Surabaya	**6**	11.0	38.0	33.0	75.0	1.7	0.3	0.5	0.5	2.3
2017	CLS Knights Surabaya	2	4.6	33.0	0.0	**100.0**	1.5	0.0	0.0	0.0	3.0
2019	Stapac Jakarta	4	25.1	32.1	0.0	58.3	5.2	**2.5**	1.5	0.2	6.2
2022	Dewa United Surabaya	3	**35.8**	**53.1**	**66.6**	78.9	**6.3**	2.3	**1.6**	**0.6**	**17.6**

=== ABL ===
==== Regular season ====
Year	Team	GP	MPG	FG%	3P%	FT%	RPG	APG	SPG	BPG	PPG
2017-18	CLS Knights Surabaya	13	10.9	39.0	21.0	60.0	1.5	0.3	0.3	0.1	4.1
