= Jamarr Johnson =

American-born Indonesian basketball player (born 1988)

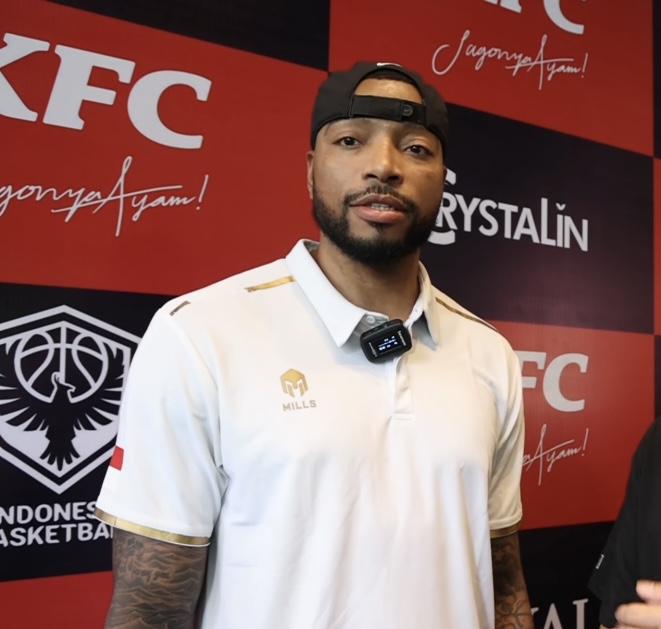
- Johnson in 2022

No. 71 – Pacific Caesar
- Position: Power forward / small forward
- League: IBL

Personal information
- Born: June 20, 1988 (age 38) Pittsgrove Township, New Jersey, U.S.
- Listed height: 6 ft 5 in (1.96 m)
- Listed weight: 210 lb (95 kg)

Career information
- High school: Schalick (Pittsgrove, New Jersey)
- College: Widener (2006–2011)
- NBA draft: 2010: undrafted
- Playing career: 2015–present

Career history
- 2015–2017: CLS Knights Surabaya
- 2017: Dunkin Raptors
- 2017: BBM Pontianak
- 2017–2019: Satria Muda Pertamina
- 2019–2023: Louvre Surabaya
- 2023–2024: Borneo Hornbills
- 2024-2025: Prawira Bandung
- 2026-present: Pacific Caesar

Career highlights
- 2× IBL champion (2016, 2018); 2× IBL All-Star (2017, 2019); 2× IBL Finals MVP (2016, 2018); All-IBL Indonesian First Team (2021); 2× IBL Most Valuable Player (2016, 2021); IBL Defensive Player of The Year (2021); IBL Rookie of the Year (2016); 2× IBL scoring champion (2016, 2021); IBL rebouding leader (2021); IBL blocks leader (2021)
Medals
Men's basketball
Representing Indonesia
SEABA Championship
Silver medal – second place	2017 Manila	Team
2021 FIBA Asia Cup SEABA Pre-Qualifier
Gold medal – first place	2018 Nonthaburi	Team
Test Event Asian Games
Gold medal – first place	2018 Jakarta	Team

Jamarr Andre Johnson (born June 20, 1988) is an American-born Indonesian professional basketball player who plays for Pacific Caesar of the Indonesian Basketball League (IBL). He is Indonesia's first American naturalized basketball player. He played college basketball for the Widener Pride.

A native of Pittsgrove Township, New Jersey, Johnson graduated from Arthur P. Schalick High School, and went on to play college basketball for Widener University.

== Professional career ==
=== Bay Area Schuckers (2011) ===
Johnson played for the Schuckers at the APBL, a semi-professional men's minor basketball league where he showed his versatility as a player and averaged 17.5 points, 9 rebounds and 4 assists.

==== Moving to and settling in Indonesia (2012–14) ====
In 2012, despite not having a team to play for and working full-time as a salesman, Johnson continued to work on his game. Eventually in 2012, he got the opportunity to come to Indonesia to teach the children of Indonesia on how to play basketball. Together with his team from Athletes in Action, Johnson flew over and began coaching there. He also had the opportunity to coach for the prestigious Pelita Harapan University men's basketball team.

=== CLS Knights Surabaya (2014–17) ===
In 2014, Johnson met with the owner of CLS Knights Surabaya whilst playing basketball, whom invited him to join his team and play in the IBL, the professional league in Indonesia. As the league then still prohibited the use of foreign players, Johnson decided to become a naturalized citizen of Indonesia. After going through one year long process of converting his citizenship, he was finally granted Indonesia's citizenship.

==== MVP and Championship Season (2015–16) ====
Johnson made an immediate impact during the pre-season and finishing the pre-season with an average of 15.67 points, 13.3 rebounds and 4 assists to go with his 2 steals and 1.3 blocks average. Johnson and CLS were eliminated in the semi-final of the preseason in an overtime lost to Aspac Jakarta despite a 37 points, 13 rebounds and 9 assist performance from him. Despite losing in the pre-season, CLS Knight was still viewed as the favorite to win the 2016 championship. Jamarr made his official debut in Indonesia, on January 10, 2016. Johnson dominated the league and ended the season with a league-leading record of 31 wins and only 2 defeats. He also led the league in points with an average of 15.25 points per game and won the MVP and Rookie of the Year award. Johnson helped CLS to win the regular season IBL title, by defeating Pelita Jaya in 3 games and winning the Finals MVP award.

==== Departure from Indonesia (2016–17) ====
There was a major rule change during his second season at the IBL. At the 2016-17 off-season, IBL announced that the league will now allow each team to draft 2 foreign players. Despite Johnson's Indonesian citizenship, he was still considered a foreign player and thus immediately took up one of the foreign player space for CLS Knights. In exchange, CLS was granted the first overall pick for the 2016 IBL Foreign Draft and used it to pick DeChriston McKinney. However, during the mid-season of 2017 Johnson was cut from the team and was replaced by Duke Crews as he was performing below expectation. There were also reports that he clashed with CLS' star point guard, Mario Wuysang and nearly gotten into an altercation during one of the practice. He ended the season averaging 11.5 points, 8.6 rebounds and 2.3 assists.

=== Dunkin Raptors (2017) ===
Johnson signed with the Dunkin Raptors of the Thailand Basketball League. In his debut, he scored 12 points and grabbed 9 rebounds to help the Raptors win against OSK R.Airline.

=== Satria Muda Pertamina Jakarta (2018–19) ===
==== Return to Indonesia and second championship (2017–18) ====
In January 2018, Johnson signed with SM Pertamina of the Indonesian Basketball League, replacing Kevin Bridgewaters as the other foreign player for the remainder of the 2017-18 IBL season. Due to his Indonesian citizenship, the height restriction for foreign player did not apply for Johnson and Satria Muda was allowed to have two big foreign import in their team to complement their talented guard lineup. He made his debut for SM with 8 points, 8 rebounds and 3 assists against NSH Jakarta on January 4, 2018. He finished the season averaging 14 points, 8.8 rebounds, 3.8 assists, 1.3 steal and 1.2 block. This season, despite not having a noticeable difference in his stats, Jamarr actually changed his playing style from the more explosive, high-flying forward to a more team-oriented, passing forward with an ability to shoot from the three point lines. He entered the 2018 IBL Playoffs as the first seed in the Red Division and faced Hangtuah Sumsel in the divisional final. After beating Hangtuah in 3 games, Johnson and Satria Muda met Pelita Jaya in the final; which so happen to be the team that defeated Satria Muda in the previous year's final, albeit without having Johnson in the team. This year however, Satria Muda came out victorious after defeating Pelita Jaya in 3 games and Johnson won the Finals MVP award.

==== First all-star with Satria Muda & Torn Achilles Injury (2018–19) ====
Johnson returned to Satria Muda for the 2018–19 season together with Dior Lowhorn. On January 5, 2019, he was selected as an all-star starter for the red division. He finished the season as the third seed with 9 wins and 9 losses while averaging a career-high in points and rebounds. On 2 February 2019, Johnson suffered an Achilles injury during Game 01 of the Red Division's semifinal against NSH Jakarta. He underwent surgery the very next day and was ruled out for the rest of the playoff.

=== Louvre Surabaya (2019–23) ===
In mid-November, Louvre Surabaya announced that they will be adding Jamarr to their official roster, however Jamarr will not be available for the upcoming 2020 IBL season while still recovering from injury. It was clarified by the owner that Jamarr, along with Brandon Jawato whom also happen to be a naturalized player will not participate in the 2020 season and their addition to the team is for the long-term plan of the team beyond 2020.

=== Borneo Hornbills (2023–present) ===
On December 4, 2023, Johnson comes back to the Indonesian Basketball League, playing for the Borneo Hornbills who recently changed their name from Bumi Borneo Pontianak.

== International career ==
Johnson was initially declared ineligible to play for the Indonesia national basketball team at the SEABA 2017 due to complication on his citizenship status of his passport. On May 16, 2017, Johnson was cleared to play the final 2 remaining games. He made his national team debut against Myanmar by scoring 17 points and led Indonesia to a blowout victory. Johnson and Indonesia were then matched up and lost against a powerhouse team, the Gilas from Philippines in the gold-medal match. During the match, Johnson was outplayed by Andray Blatche and only managed to score 4 points.

Despite high hopes and rumors, Johnson was unfortunately not selected for SEA Games 2017 that was held from 20 to 26 August 2017 at Kuala Lumpur as Indonesia opted to go with Ebrahim Enguio Lopez instead for their naturalized player spot.

Johnson was called to play for the national team for the 2018 Test Event Asian Games in February 2018. There, he led his team to win the gold medal for Indonesia.

Johnson was again selected to represent Indonesia for the 2018 Asian Games. As Indonesia was the country host, they were expected to perform and enter the elimination round. Indonesia nearly missed the elimination round after being upset by Mongolia and managed to enter the elimination round through point-differential. However, they were matched up against China that was led by then NBA player, Zhou Qi in the opening round and was defeated 98 to 63. Indonesia ended up finishing 8th, the highest finish the country has ever achieved in its history

== IBL career statistics ==
Legend
GP	Games played	GS	Games started	MPG	Minutes per game
FG%	Field goal percentage	3P%	3-point field goal percentage	FT%	Free throw percentage
RPG	Rebounds per game	APG	Assists per game	SPG	Steals per game
BPG	Blocks per game	PPG	Points per game	**Bold**	Career high

†	Denotes seasons in which Johnson won an IBL championship
*	Led the league

=== Regular season ===
Years	Country	Teams	League	GP	Min	FG%	3P%	FT%	APG	RPG	SPG	BPG	PPG
2015–16	Indonesia	CLS Knights	IBL	**28**	35.0	**47.0**	**37.0**	71.0	2.9	9.8	**1.9**	1.1	15.3
2016–17	Indonesia	CLS Knights	IBL	12	26.0	35.0	19.0	73.0	2.3	8.6	1.0	0.7	11.5
2017–18	Indonesia	Satria Muda Pertamina Jakarta	IBL	10	36.0	44.0	35.0	58.0	**3.8**	8.8	1.3	1.2	14.0
2018–19	Indonesia	Satria Muda Pertamina Jakarta	IBL	18	32.5	43.0	36.0	71.0	3.6	10.0	1.7	0.9	17.4
2019–20	Indonesia	Louvre Surabaya	IBL	DID NOT PLAY: TORN ACHILLES									
2020–21	Indonesia	Louvre Surabaya	IBL	15	**36.1**	44.8	36.0	**77.6**	2.9	**11.9**	1.5	**1.6**	**20.2**

=== Playoffs ===
Years	Country	Teams	League	GP	Min	FG%	3P%	FT%	APG	RPG	SPG	BPG	PPG
2016	Indonesia	CLS Knights	IBL	**6**	34.1	36%	25%	63%	3.0	9.7	**2.8**	1.8	17.2
2018	Indonesia	Satria Muda Pertamina Jakarta	IBL	**6**	34.3	39%	26.0%	**74%**	**4.5**	9.3	1.7	1.0	14.5
2019	Indonesia	Satria Muda Pertamina Jakarta	IBL	3	32.6	**47%**	21%	72%	4.3	12.0	1.0	1.3	17.3
2021	Indonesia	Louvre Surabaya	IBL	5	**38.68**	42%	**47%**	58%	3.0	**14.0**	1.4	**2.4**	**20.6**

== TBL career statistics ==
Legend
GP	Games played	GS	Games started	MPG	Minutes per game
FG%	Field goal percentage	3P%	3-point field goal percentage	FT%	Free throw percentage
RPG	Rebounds per game	APG	Assists per game	SPG	Steals per game
BPG	Blocks per game	PPG	Points per game	**Bold**	Career high

†	Denotes seasons in which Johnson won a TBL Championship
*	Led the league

=== Regular season ===
Years	Country	Teams	League	GP	Min	FG%	3P%	FT%	APG	RPG	SPG	BPG	PPG
2017	Thailand	Dunkin' Raptors	TBL	9	37.3	37.0	21.0	63.0	5.2	11.6	2.6	1.1	15.8

== International career statistics ==
Year	Competition	GP	Min	FG%	3P%	FT%	APG	RPG	SPG	BPG	PPG
2017	**Southeast Asia Basketball Association Championship**	2	19.7	55.6	0.00	25.0	2.0	4.5	1.0	0.5	10.5
2018	Test Event Asian Games 2018	4	???	???	???	???	2.3	11.3	???	???	14.3
2018	2021 FIBA Asia Cup SEABA Pre-Qualifier	5	28.2	45.5	33.3	87.9	3.4	8.8	0.8	0.8	16.6
2018	2018 Asian Games	6	33.72	40.22	31.81	80.95	3.33	11.16	1.66	0.83	18.5
2018	2021 FIBA Asia Cup East Region Pre-Qualifiers	5	30.1	37.1	26.3	77.3	1.4	9.8	1.8	0.6	13.6
Career		22	?	?	?	?	2.7	9.7	?	?	15.8
