= Randy Ady Prasetya =

Indonesian basketball player

Randy Prasetya
No. 14 – Kesatria Bengawan Solo
- Position: Center / power forward
- League: IBL

Personal information
- Born: 31 October 1999 (age 27) Padang, Indonesia
- Listed height: 202 cm (6 ft 8 in)
- Listed weight: 77 kg (170 lb)

Career information
- College: Satya Wacana Christian University
- Playing career: 2021–present

Career history
- 2021-2025: Satya Wacana Saints
- 2025-present: Kesatria Bengawan Solo

Career highlights
- All-IBL Indonesian First Team (2023); IBL All-Star (2023)

Randy Ady Prasetya (born October 31, 1999) is an Indonesian professional basketball player for the Kesatria Bengawan Solo of the Indonesian Basketball League (IBL). He was drafted in the recommended round of the 2021 IBL Draft.

== National team career ==
Prasetya was a part of the Indonesia Patriots, the team led by Youbel Sondakh that played in the International Basketball Invitational in 2023 that was held by the Indonesian Basketball Association (PERBASI).
