= Respati Ragil =

Indonesian basketball player

Free agent
- Position: Shooting guard / point guard

Personal information
- Born: 3 April 1991 (age 35) Banjarnegara, Indonesia
- Listed height: 5 ft 11 in (1.80 m)
- Listed weight: 75 kg (165 lb)

Career information
- High school: SMAN 1 (Banjarnegara, Indonesia); SMA Theresiana 1 (Semarang, Indonesia)
- College: Satya Wacana Christian University
- Playing career: 2010–present

Career history
- 2010-2016: Satya Wacana Saints
- 2016-2021: Pelita Jaya
- 2021-2022: West Bandits Solo
- 2022-2024: Evos Thunder Bogor / Rajawali Medan
- 2024-2025: Borneo Hornbills / Bogor Basketball

Career highlights
- IBL champion (2017); 2× IBL All-Star (2018, 2020); All-IBL Indonesian First Team (2018); NBL Indonesia scoring champion (2015)

Respati Ragil Pamungkas (born April 3, 1991) is an Indonesian professional basketball player who last played for the Borneo Hornbills of the Indonesian Basketball League (IBL).

Ragil represented Indonesia's national basketball team at the 2015 SEABA Championship in Singapore.
