= Madarious Gibbs =

American basketball player

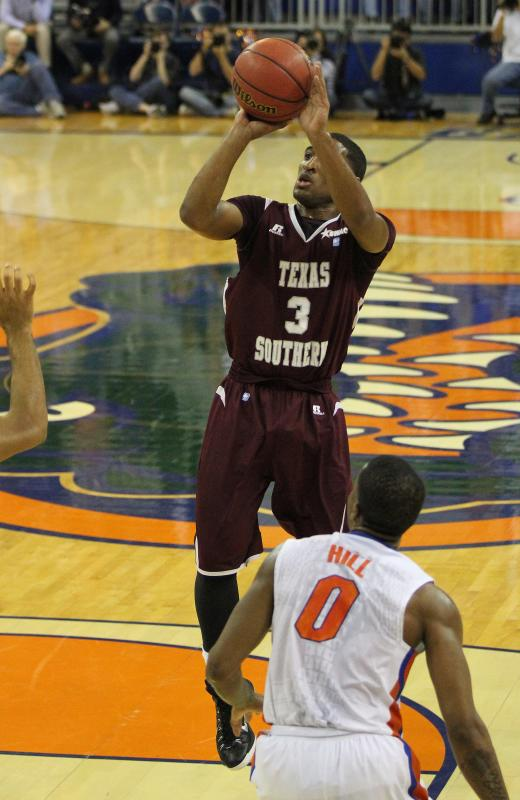
- Gibbs playing for Texas Southern

Personal information
- Born: May 7, 1993 (age 33) Newnan, Georgia, U.S.
- Listed height: 6 ft 0 in (1.83 m)
- Listed weight: 190 lb (86 kg)

Career information
- High school: East Coweta (Sharpsburg, Georgia)
- College: Texas Southern (2011–2015)
- NBA draft: 2015: undrafted
- Playing career: 2015–present
- Position: Point guard
- Number: 3

Career history
- 2016–2017: Monopoli Italy
- 2017–2021: Satya Wacana Salatiga
- 2023: Nha Trang Dolphins

Career highlights
- IBL Foreign Player of the Year (2019); 2× IBL scoring champion (2018, 2019); IBL All-Star (2019); AP honorable mention All-American (2015); SWAC Player of the Year (2015); First-team All-SWAC (2015); SWAC Tournament MVP (2015)

Madarious Jaquil Gibbs (born May 7, 1993) is an American basketball player who last played for the Nha Trang Dolphins of the Vietnam Basketball Association (VBA). He played college basketball for Texas Southern Tigers.

Gibbs, a point guard from Newnan, Georgia, played four seasons for TSU, leading the team to back-to-back Southwestern Athletic Conference (SWAC) titles in 2014 and 2015. As a senior in the 2014–15 season, Gibbs was named SWAC Player of the Year and an honorable mention All-American by the Associated Press. Gibbs led the Tigers to the 2015 SWAC Tournament title, earning MVP honors.

Gibbs went undrafted in the 2015 NBA draft. As a means to increase his chances of securing a free agent deal, Gibbs joined his former TSU teammates on a playing tour of China in the Summer of 2015.

== College career (2011–15) ==
Gibbs attended Texas Southern University and played under coach, Tony Harvey during his freshman year for Texas Southern Tigers basketball. That year, he started 9 out of the 33 games as his team finished with a 15–18 record and missed the NCAA tournament. The

== Professional career ==
=== Monopoli Italy ===
In Season 2016–17 he play in Serie C Italy for Monopoli Italy. He averaged 24.7 points, 6 rebounds, 4 assists with 58.0% FG, 37.0% 3FG and 72.0% FT in 27 games.

=== Satya Wacana Salatiga (2017–present) ===
Gibbs was selected in the 2nd round of 2017 Indonesian Basketball League Draft by Satya Wacana Salatiga. Gibbs played extremely well in his first year with Satya Wacana as he averaged league-leading 27.56 points along with 5.7 rebounds, 5.4 assists and 1.7 steals. His team however only won 5 games and missed the playoff. Gibbs was retained by Satya Wacana for the 2018–19 season. On December 9, 2018, Gibbs scored a career-high 53 points as he and his team upset a powerhouse team in Pelita Jaya.

== Career statistics ==
Legend
GP	Games played	GS	Games started	MPG	Minutes per game
FG%	Field goal percentage	3P%	3-point field goal percentage	FT%	Free throw percentage
RPG	Rebounds per game	APG	Assists per game	SPG	Steals per game
BPG	Blocks per game	PPG	Points per game	**Bold**	Career high

†	Denotes seasons in which Gibbs won an IBL championship
*	Led the league

=== Regular season ===
Years	Country	Teams	League	GP	Min	FG%	3P%	FT%	APG	RPG	SPG	BPG	PPG
2017–18	Indonesia	Satya Wacana	IBL	16	36.2	**.470**	**.360**	.550	5.4	5.7	**1.7**	0.1	27.6
2018–19	Indonesia	Satya Wacana	IBL	**18**	**38.2**	.420	.310	**.670**	**7.4**	**7.1**	1.4	**0.4**	**29.7**
