= Henry Cornelis Lakay =

Indonesian basketball player

Henry Lakay
No. 12 – Satya Wacana Saints
- Position: Center / power forward
- League: IBL

Personal information
- Born: 12 May 1998 (age 28) Merauke, Indonesia
- Listed height: 196 cm (6 ft 5 in)
- Listed weight: 96 kg (212 lb)

Career information
- High school: John XXIII (Merauke, Indonesia)
- College: Satya Wacana Christian University
- Playing career: 2017–present

Career history
- 2017-present: Satya Wacana Saints

Career highlights
- IBL All-Star (2023); All-IBL Indonesian First Team (2020); IBL Most Inspiration Young Player of the Year (2018)

Henry "Hengky" Cornelis Lakay (born May 12, 1998) is an Indonesian professional basketball player for the Satya Wacana Saints of the Indonesian Basketball League (IBL).

== High school career ==
In his senior year, Henry was selected as a DBL All-Star in 2015 that was held at California.

== National team career ==
He has represented the Indonesia men's national 3x3 team at several occasions.
