= Serhii Pavlov =

Ukrainian basketball player

No. 23 – Satya Wacana Saints
- Position: Power forward
- League: IBL

Personal information
- Born: 18 July 1997 (age 29) Makiivka, Ukraine
- Listed height: 2.04 m (6 ft 8 in)
- Listed weight: 229 lb (104 kg)

Career information
- NBA draft: 2019: undrafted
- Playing career: 2013–present

Career history
- 2013–2014: BC Donetsk
- 2015–2019: BC Khimik
- 2019: BC Pieno žvaigždės
- 2019–2021: Kyiv-Basket
- 2021–2022: BC Dnipro
- 2022: Club Melilla Baloncesto
- 2022: BC Pärnu Sadam
- 2023–2025: Śląsk Wrocław
- 2025-present: Satya Wacana Saints

Serhii Pavlov (born 18 July 1997) is a Ukrainian professional basketball player for Satya Wacana Saints of the Indonesian Basketball League (IBL).

== Professional career ==
Pavlov joined BC Dnipro in 2021 and averaged 10.5 points, 5.1 rebounds, and 1.1 assists per game. On March 12, 2022, he signed with Club Melilla Baloncesto of the LEB Oro. In September 2022 he signed with BC Pärnu Sadam.

On January 17, 2023, he signed with Śląsk Wrocław of the PLK.

== National team ==
He represented Ukraine at multiple international tournaments at both junior and senior level. He took part in the 2019 FIBA Basketball World Cup qualification and the 2013 FIBA Europe Under-16 Championship.

He also played at the 2019 Summer Universiade where he helped win the silver medal.

== Personal ==
Pavlov is originally from Donetsk. He started basketball in the second grade. He hails from a famity of athletes as his mother is a basketball player while his father practices pentathlon.
