= Louvre Surabaya =

- Founded: 2019
- Folded: 2019
- History: Louvre Surabaya (2019–2023); Louvre Dewa United Surabaya (2021)
- Team colors: Green, Red, White, Black

Louvre Surabaya is an Indonesian professional basketball team based in Surabaya, East Java. Founded in 2019, the team made its debut in the 2023 season of the ASEAN Basketball League. Home games of Louvre are played at the Hi-Test Arena.

The club was founded by former national team player Denny Sumargo and initially played in the Indonesian Basketball League (IBL). In the 2021 season, they reached the league semi-finals. For the 2023 season, after their application was rejected, they entered the ABL in 2023, becoming the fourth team from Indonesia to play in the league. Louvre's head coach was the Filipino Gino Enriquez in Singapore series, the American Brian Rowsom in Batam series and Filipino Jomar Tierra in Malaysia and Vietnam series.

== Season by season ==
| Season | Tier | League | Regular season | | | | | Playoffs | Head coach |
| Season | Tier | League | Finish | Played | Wins | Losses | Win% | Playoffs | Head coach |
|---|---|---|---|---|---|---|---|---|---|
| 2020 | 1 | IBL | 5th | 14 | 7 | 7 | .500 | Cancelled | Andika Saputra |
| 2021 | 1 | IBL | 2nd | 16 | 10 | 6 | .625 | Semi-finalist | Andika Saputra |
| 2023 | – | ABL | 7th | 14 | 1 | 13 | .071 | Did not qualify | Gino Enriquez; Brian Rowsom; Jomar Tierra |

== 2023 roster ==
Louvre Surabaya roster
Players
Coaches

| Pos. | No. | Nat. | Name | Ht. | Wt. | DOB (YYYY-MM-DD) | From |
|---|---|---|---|---|---|---|---|
| PG | 7 | (Indonesia) | Samuel Pelmelay | 1.80 m (5 ft 11 in) | 66 kg (146 lb) | 31 – 10 November 1994 |
| SF | 8 | (United States) | Marcus Hammonds (WI) | 1.96 m (6 ft 5 in) | 91 kg (201 lb) | 38 – 11 August 1987 | Texas A&M–Corpus Christi |
| PG | 9 | (Indonesia) | Yerikho Tuasela | 1.80 m (5 ft 11 in) | 80 kg (176 lb) | 28 – 27 December 1997 |
| SF | 11 | (Indonesia) | Richnel Loupatty | 1.86 m (6 ft 1 in) | 74 kg (163 lb) | 30 – 9 December 1995 |
| SG | 14 | (Indonesia) | James Marshall | 1.82 m (6 ft 0 in) | | 24 – 19 November 2001 |
| G | 17 | (Indonesia) | Francisco Da Silva | 1.90 m (6 ft 3 in) | | 35 – 17 April 1991 |
| G/F | 21 | (Indonesia) | Muhamad Islamy | 1.86 m (6 ft 1 in) | 70 kg (154 lb) | 34 – 11 October 1991 |
| F | 29 | (Indonesia) | Raylly Pratama | 1.94 m (6 ft 4 in) | 91 kg (201 lb) | 35 – 22 May 1990 |
| SG | 31 | (Indonesia) (Philippines) | Ebrahim Enguio (AI) | 1.83 m (6 ft 0 in) | 80 kg (176 lb) | 38 – 31 March 1988 | UE |
| PF | 33 | (Indonesia) | Luthfianes Gunawan | 1.94 m (6 ft 4 in) | 90 kg (198 lb) | 36 – 22 September 1989 |
| SG | 69 | (Indonesia) | Gusti Saputra | 1.82 m (6 ft 0 in) | | 33 – 28 November 1992 |
| SF | 71 | (Indonesia) (United States) | Jamarr Johnson (WI) | 1.96 m (6 ft 5 in) | 94 kg (207 lb) | 37 – 20 June 1988 | Widener |
| C | 92 | (France) | Alioune Tew (WI) | 2.06 m (6 ft 9 in) | 98 kg (216 lb) | 34 – 7 April 1992 | Niagara |

Head coach

- (Philippines) Jomar G Tierra

Legend

- (C) Team captain
- (WI) World import
- (AI) ASEAN heritage import
- Injured

This is the lineup of the Louvre for the 2023 ABL season.

== Coaches ==
- (Philippines) Gino Enriquez (2023)
- (United States) Brian Rowsom (2023)
- (Philippines) Jomar G Tierra (2023)
