= Teddy Apriyana Romadonsyah =

Indonesian basketball player

Teddy Romadonsyah
Free agent
- Position: Shooting guard / small forward

Personal information
- Born: April 9, 1990 (age 36) Bandung, Indonesia
- Listed height: 1.90 m (6 ft 3 in)
- Listed weight: 187 lb (85 kg)

Career information
- College: ITHB (2009-2015)
- Playing career: 2014–present

Career history

Playing
- 2014–2019: JNE Bandung Utama
- 2019-2022: Pelita Jaya
- 2022-2024: Tangerang Hawks
- 2024-2025: Prawira Bandung

Coaching
- 2025-present: Akademi Bandung Utama

Teddy Apriyana Romadonsyah (born April 9, 1990), is an Indonesian professional basketball player who last played for Prawira Bandung of the Indonesian Basketball League (IBL).

== National team career ==
He represented Indonesia's national basketball team at the 2016 SEABA Cup.
