= Dior Lowhorn =

American basketball player (born 1987)

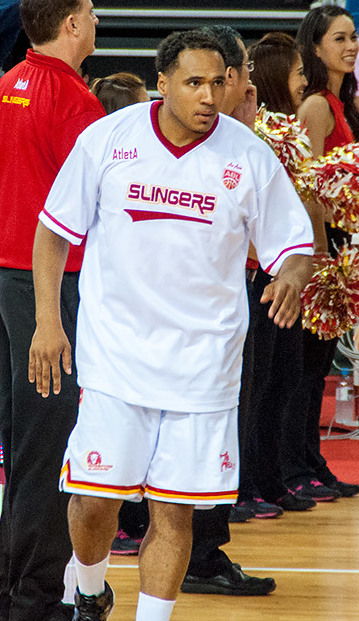
- Lowhorn with the Singapore Slingers in 2014

Personal information
- Born: April 15, 1987 (age 39) San Francisco, California
- Listed height: 6 ft 7 in (2.01 m)
- Listed weight: 230 lb (104 kg)

Career information
- High school: Berkeley (Berkeley, California)
- College: Texas Tech (2005–2006); San Francisco (2007–2010)
- NBA draft: 2010: undrafted
- Playing career: 2010–2023
- Position: Small forward / power forward

Career history
- 2010–2011: Leuven Bears
- 2011: Dnipro-Azot
- 2011–2012: Astrum Levice
- 2011–2012: →Onyx Levice
- 2012: Gaiteros del Zulia
- 2012–2013: Saigon Heat
- 2013: Barangay Ginebra San Miguel
- 2013–2014: Wydad Casablanca
- 2014: Hamamatsu Higashimikawa Phoenix
- 2014: GlobalPort Batang Pier
- 2014: Singapore Slingers
- 2014–2015: Club La Unión
- 2016: Rain or Shine Elasto Painters
- 2017–2019: Satria Muda Pertamina
- 2019–2020: Pelita Jaya
- 2020: Plateros de Fresnillo
- 2021: Abejas de León
- 2021–2022: Pelita Jaya
- 2022-2023: Bali United Basketball

Career highlights
- IBL champion (2018); IBL scoring champion (2020); IBL All-Star (2018); 3× First-team All-WCC (2008–2010)

Dior Alexandros Lowhorn (born April 15, 1987) is an American former professional basketball player. He played college basketball for Texas Tech and San Francisco.

== High school career ==
Lowhorn attended International Studies Academy in San Francisco his freshman year of high school, where he was a standout in basketball. At ISA, Lowhorn averaged 15 pts, 8 rbs and was named Second Team All AAA. His sophomore year he attended Archbishop Riordan High School in San Francisco, where he was named First Team All WCAL and First Team All State. On December 16, 2002, Lowhorn led his Riordan team to the Burlingame Tournament Championship, breaking the school's single-game scoring record with 48 points. In 2003 Lowhorn transferred to Berkeley High School, where he was honored both his junior and senior year with numerous accolades including ACCAL Player of the Year, NorCal Player of the Year and First Team All State. His senior year Berkeley captured their first NCS Title since 1978.

== College career ==
Lowhorn attended Texas Tech University, where he averaged 7.6 ppg and 3.2 rpg while playing for coach Bob Knight.

In 2006, Lowhorn transferred to the University of San Francisco, where he red-shirted his first year due to NCAA rules.

In 2007, Lowhorn averaged 20.5 ppg and 7.2 rpg. He was named First Team All WCC. He ended his sophomore year with a total of 636 points, the fourth-most points a USF Don has ever scored in a single season. Due to a coaching change, he finished that season under coach Eddie Sutton.

In 2008, Lowhorn averaged 20.1 ppg and 6.9 rpg. He was named First Team All WCC. After the 2008–2009 season, Lowhorn was invited for a pre-draft workout with the Portland Trail Blazers and the Sacramento Kings. In 2009, Lowhorn averaged 18.9 ppg and 6.2 rpg. He was yet again named First Team All WCC. Due to another university coaching change, Lowhorn played under former NBA player Rex Walters. During Lowhorn's senior year he broke the fastest to 1,000 points record previously held by USF Hall of Famer and ten-time NBA champion Bill Russell. After the 2009–2010 season, Lowhorn was invited to pre-draft workouts with the Portland Trail Blazers, Sacramento Kings and Golden State Warriors.

== Professional career ==
Between 2010 and 2015, Lowhorn played in Europe, Morocco, Southeast Asia and South America.

On November 2, 2015, Lowhorn was acquired by the Santa Cruz Warriors of the NBA Development League. However, he was waived on November 10, before playing a game for the Warriors.

Lowhorn spent the 2019-20 season with Pelita Jaya Bakrie of the Indonesian Basketball League (IBL). He averaged 28.3 points, 13.6 rebounds, 1.3 assists, and 1.2 blocks per game. On August 25, 2020, Lowhorn signed with Plateros de Fresnillo of the LNBP. He averaged 6.6 points, 4.0 rebounds, and 1.0 assist per game. On October 9, 2021, Lowhorn signed with Abejas de León.

== Personal life ==
Lowhorn has one son, Dior Alejandro Lowhorn, born September 17, 2015. Lowhorn's parents are April Chandler and Walter Lowhorn. He has one brother, Paris Lowhorn. Lowhorn graduated from the University of San Francisco with an Environmental Studies major. Played AAU basketball with Bay Area Blast, Oakland Soldiers, Next Level, Frisco Finest, Oakland Rebels, Mission Rec, SF Boys club, Hamilton Park, H-Squad, and Belmont Shores. Starred in Baseball as a kid before growing and playing basketball.
