= Adhi Pratama =

Indonesian basketball player

Pelita Jaya
- Title: Team manager
- League: IBL

Personal information
- Born: 31 January 1993 (age 33) Jakarta, Indonesia
- Listed height: 197 cm (6 ft 6 in)
- Listed weight: 100 kg (220 lb)

Career information
- College: STIE Bhakti Pembangunan
- Playing career: 2010–2020
- Position: Center
- Number: 14

Career history
- 2010-2014: Muba Hangtuah
- 2014-2020: Pelita Jaya

Career highlights
- IBL champion (2017); All-NBL Indonesia First Team (2015); NBL Indonesia Most Valuable Player (2015); As general manager: IBL champion (2024)
Medals
Men's basketball
Representing Indonesia
Southeast Asian Games
Silver medal – second place	2015 Singapore	Team
Test Event Asian Games
Gold medal – first place	2018 Jakarta	Team

Adhi Pratama Prasetyo Putra (born January 31, 1993) is an Indonesian former professional basketball player, and currently the general manager for Pelita Jaya Bakrie of the Indonesian Basketball League (IBL). He has won two championships, as a player, and a manager for Pelita Jaya, he also formerly played center for the Indonesia national basketball team.

== Career ==
Adhi's knee injury influenced his decision to retire from basketball.

== National team career ==
Adhi represented the Indonesia national basketball team. He won the silver medal in the 2015 Southeast Asian Games that was held in Singapore, and he also played in the 2018 Asian Games that was held in their country.
