= Jawa Pos Arena =

Indoor sporting arena

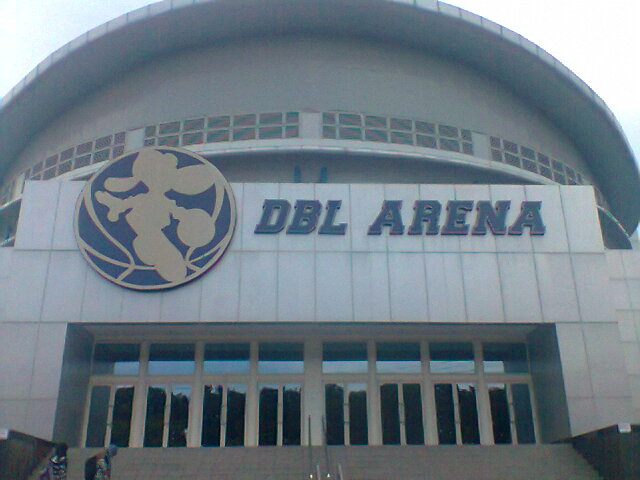
- Interactive map of Jawa Pos Arena
- Location: Jalan Ahmad Yani 88; Surabaya, East Java, Indonesia
- Coordinates: 7.3205°S 112.7322°E
- Owner: Jawa Pos Group
- Operator: DBL Indonesia
- Capacity: 5,000

Construction
- Groundbreaking: 17 December 2007
- Opened: 26 July 2008

Website
- grahapenajawapos.com/jawaposarena

Jawa Pos Arena, previously DBL Arena, is an indoor sporting arena located in Surabaya, East Java, Indonesia. Located in the suburb of Surabaya, adjacent to the Graha Pena building, it is renowned as one of the Indonesia's main venue for basketball matches. It is also home for the Development Basketball League, a basketball competition between junior and senior high schools formerly named DetEksi Basketball League (DBL). It is owned by Jawa Pos Group, and operated by DBL Indonesia.

== See also ==
- List of indoor arenas
- Mata Elang International Stadium
- Istora Gelora Bung Karno
- The BritAma Arena
- Palembang Sport and Convention Center
