= GOR Sahabat =

Indonesian sports arena

- Location in Semarang
- Full name: Gelanggang Olahraga Sahabat
- Location: Jl. Sendangsari Utara XIII, Semarang
- Coordinates: 6.996300199999999°S 110.4541397°E
- Capacity: 1,500

Construction
- Cost: 3 Billion IDR

Tenant
- Sahabat Semarang (Women Indonesian Basketball League)

GOR Sahabat is a multifunctional sports arena in Semarang, Indonesia. The arena is home to the Sahabat Semarang basketball team from WIBL. It can also accommodate basketball, karate, taekwondo and other events. GOR Sahabat usually becomes one of the match venues for IBL and WIBL.
