= GOR C-Tra Arena =

Sport Arena

Bandung Arena
- Location: Bandung, Indonesia
- Owner: PT Persib Bandung Bermartabat
- Capacity: 5,000

Construction
- Groundbreaking: 1989
- Opened: 1999

Tenants
- Prawira Bandung (Indonesian Basketball League) 2015-2025; Satria Muda Bandung (Indonesian Basketball League) 2025-present

Bandung Arena formerly known as GOR C-Tra Arena, is a multifunction sport arena in Bandung, Indonesia. This arena is home for the Satria Muda Bandung of the Indonesian Basketball League (IBL). This arena can be used as basketball, volleyball, or futsal venues.
