= Satya Wacana Salatiga =

Indonesian basketball team

Satya Wacana Saints Salatiga ꦱꦠꦾꦮꦕꦤꦱꦻꦤ꧀ꦱꦭꦠꦶꦒ
- 2026 IBL Indonesia
- Leagues: Indonesian Basketball League
- Founded: 2007
- Arena: GOR Basket Susilo Wibowo
- Location: Salatiga, Indonesia
- Team colors: White, Yellow, Cyan
- President: Yafet Y.W Rissy
- Head coach: Jerry Lolowang
- Website: satyawacana.profile
Home uniform	Away uniform

Satya Wacana Saints Salatiga is an Indonesian professional basketball club based in Salatiga, Central Java. Formerly known as Angsapura Evalube Medan, it changed its name to Satya Wacana Angsapura Salatiga for the 2010-11 season of NBL Indonesia. Satya Wacana is based on Satya Wacana Christian University, making them the only IBL team that is based from a university.

== Record NBL/IBL ==
Season	W	L	Pos	Play-off	W	L
2010-11	2	25	9th Place	-	-	-
2011-12	4	29	11th Place	-	-	-
2012-13	9	24	9th Place	-	-	-
2013-14	9	24	10th Place	-	-	-
2014-15	10	23	10th Place	-	-	-
2015-16	13	20	8th Place	Round 1	0	1
2016-17	1	14	11th Place	-	-	-
Total	48	159	192	Total	0	1

== Roster ==
Satya Wacana Saints roster
Players
Coaches

Pos.	No.	Nat.	Name	Ht.	Wt.
PG	0	(Canada)	Kevin Kangu (I)	1.93 m (6 ft 4 in)	84 kg (185 lb)
SG	1	(Indonesia)	Rendy Wijaya	1.90 m (6 ft 3 in)	72 kg (159 lb)
SF	3	(United States)	Leon Gilmore III (I)	1.96 m (6 ft 5 in)	90 kg (198 lb)
SG	4	(Indonesia)	Raden Nathaniq Sardy	1.95 m (6 ft 5 in)	80 kg (176 lb)
PG	5	(Indonesia)	Henry Sualang (R)	1.69 m (5 ft 7 in)	69 kg (152 lb)
SG	8	(Indonesia)	Kevin Immanuel Mendita	1.92 m (6 ft 4 in)	94 kg (207 lb)
SG	11	(Indonesia)	Mochammad Nabizar Taqwa (R)	1.87 m (6 ft 2 in)	80 kg (176 lb)
F/C	12	(Indonesia)	Henry Cornelis Lakay (C)	1.96 m (6 ft 5 in)	96 kg (212 lb)
PG	13	(Indonesia)	Yehezkiel Mahesvara	1.80 m (5 ft 11 in)	76 kg (168 lb)
PF	18	(Indonesia)	Immanuel Mailensun	1.88 m (6 ft 2 in)	88 kg (194 lb)
F/C	23	(Ukraine)	Serhii Pavlov (I)	2.09 m (6 ft 10 in)	104 kg (229 lb)
PG	25	(Indonesia)	Teemo Teemo	1.78 m (5 ft 10 in)	75 kg (165 lb)
C	27	(Indonesia)	Serigne Modou Kane	1.97 m (6 ft 6 in)	90 kg (198 lb)
F/C	77	(Indonesia)	Mas Kahono Alif Bintang	1.92 m (6 ft 4 in)	79 kg (174 lb)

Head coach

- (Indonesia) Jerry Lolowang

Assistant coach(es)

- (Indonesia) Revan Jonathan
- (Indonesia) Musthofa Ramadhan

Legend

- (C) Team captain
- (I) Import player
- (R) Rookie
- Injured

- Roster
Updated: 2026-01-13

=== Depth chart ===
Pos.	Starting 5	Bench
C	Serhii Pavlov	Serigne Modou Kane
PF	Leon Gilmore III	Immanuel Mailensun
SF	Kevin Kangu	Mas Kahono Alif Bintang
SG	Kevin Immanuel	Yehezkiel Mahesvara
PG	Teemo Teemo	Henry Sualang

== Notable players ==
- (United States) Nate Maxey (2016–17)
- (United States) Jarron Crump (2016–17)
- (Indonesia) Valentino Wuwungan (2010–11)
- (Indonesia) Respati Ragil (2011–16)
- (Indonesia) Tri Hartanto (2012–14)
- (Indonesia) Firman Dwi Nugroho (2013–16)
- (Indonesia) Yo Sua (2011–15)
- (Indonesia) Kaleb Gemilang (2013-14)
- (Indonesia) Januar Kuntara (2013-14)
- (Indonesia) Yoppie Fance Giay (2010–15)
- (Indonesia) Cassiopeia Manuputty (2017-20)
- (United States) Madarious Gibbs (2017-21)
- (Indonesia) Randy Ady Prasetya (2021-25)
- (Democratic Republic of the Congo) Gracin Bakumanya (2025)
- (Ukraine) Serhii Pavlov (2025-26)
- (Indonesia) Teemo (2025-26)
- (Indonesia) Henry Cornelis Lakay (2017-26)
