= Harapan Bangsa Institute of Technology =

Private university in West Java, Indonesia

- Institut Teknologi Harapan Bangsa
- Type: Private
- Established: 17 May 2002
- Location: Bandung, West Java, Indonesia; 6.8893488°S 107.6160988°E
- Nickname: ITHB
- Sporting affiliations: LIMA
- Website: www.ithb.ac.id

Harapan Bangsa Institute of Technology (Indonesian: Institut Teknologi Harapan Bangsa, ITHB) is a private university in Bandung, West Java, Indonesia. It was established by 'Yayasan Petra Harapan Bangsa' on 17 May 2002. , with a vision to educate future leaders who make difference .

== History ==
- 2002 : ITHB was founded with the goal of Educating Future Leaders Who Make a Difference
- 2005 : Introducing SAP certification and international programs
- 2006 : Accreditation by BAN-PT, Establisment of Harapan Bangsa Business School
- 2008 : Joint program with Raffles College of Design and Commerce Sydney
- 2010 : Alumni recruited by Accenture Malaysia (the world's largest IT Consulting firm)
- 2012 : Development of graduate profiles, curriculum, lecturer performance management, student performance system, and parent-teacher reporting system
- 2016: Establishment of the Supply Chain Management Study Program; the only IT-based Supply Chain study program in Indonesia
- 2017: Establishment of the Fashion Apparel Design Study Program, Pioneering the formation of the Indonesian Christian Student Fellowship Network (JPMKI)
- 2018: Establishment of the Online Business Study Program
- 2022: Establishment of the Magister Management Program

== Management ==
- Dr. Bersih Tarigan - Ketua Yayasan Petra Harapan Bangsa
- Dr. Ir. Samuel Tarigan, M.B.A. - Rektor
- Dr. Ir. Roland Y. H. Silitonga, M.T - Direktur Akademik
- Maclaurin Hutagalung, B.E, M.Sc, Ph.D - Direktur Pengembangan Bisnis
- Anggoro Prasetyo Utomo, M.T.. - Direktur Operasi dan Sumberdaya
- Yoyok Gamaliel MT - Direktur Kemahasiswaan & CRC

== Board of Advisors ==
- Prof. Dr. The Houw Liong (ITB) - Ketua Dewan Pembina
- Prof. Dr. Ir. Soelarso, MSME
- R K Sembiring, Ph.D (Profesor Emeritus)

== Faculties & Study program ==
ITHB has an undergraduate & postgraduate Study Programs.

Undergraduate Program

- Informatics Engineering
- Information System
- Industrial Engineering
- Visual Communication Design
- Accounting
- Management
- Online Business

Postgraduate program

- Magister Management

== Profesional Certification ==
- SAP University Alliance Program Diarsipkan 2014-06-19 di Wayback Machine.
- Oracle Workforce Development Program
- Cisco
- Microsoft Software Developer Network
- ACCA[1]
- Adobe Certified Associate

== Partner Company ==
- Accenture
- Anabatic Technologies
- Astra Graphia IT
- Astra Honda Motor
- Balicamp Depkominfo
- Dexa Medica Group
- Dian Mentari Pratama Advertising Dongyang Electronic
- Elnusa (Pertamina)
- Ernst & Young
- Euro RSCG Adwork
- Hewlett Packard
- Huawei
- Hyperintel Solution
- iComm International Diarsipkan 2014-05-17 di Wayback Machine.
- Indosat Matahari Indonesia Diarsipkan 2007-11-24 di Wayback Machine.
- Make Great Things Happen International (Bakrie Group) Metrodata
- Mitrais Diarsipkan 2014-06-19 di Wayback Machine.
- Nestle Indonesia Diarsipkan 2014-07-14 di Wayback Machine.
- Nokia Siemens Indonesia Diarsipkan 2014-07-04 di Wayback Machine.
- OCBC NISP
- Orang Tua Group Diarsipkan 2014-06-25 di Wayback Machine.
- Plasmedia
- Prima Sistem Terpadau (SAP Consultant)
- Telkom
- Sigma Cipta Caraka
- Sinar Mas Group
- (SAP Consultant) Diarsipkan 2016-08-11 di Wayback Machine.
- Telkomsel
- ZTE Indonesia
