= Basketball at the 2015 SEA Games – Men's tournament =

Basketball – Men's tournament at the 2015 SEA Games
- Venue: OCBC Arena Hall 1
- Dates: 9–15 June 2015
- Competitors: 88 from 9 nations

Medalists
gold medal	Philippines
silver medal	Indonesia
bronze medal	Singapore

The men's basketball tournament at the 2015 SEA Games was held in Kallang, Singapore at the OCBC Arena Hall 1 from 9 to 15 June.

Timor-Leste made their international debut, after being accepted to FIBA in 2013.

The Philippines defended its gold medal for the tenth straight time.

The official detailed schedule for the tournament was announced on 30 April 2015.

== Draw ==
The draw was held on 30 April 2015 at the OCBC Arena Hall 1 during the 2015 SEABA Championship. First seed Philippines were grouped with Malaysia, Indonesia and Timor-Leste. Second seed Thailand and third seed Singapore were grouped with Cambodia, Myanmar and Vietnam. The groups were determined via the teams' performance in the 2013 games; the only teams that did not participate in 2013, Vietnam and Timor-Leste, were put to a draw. Singapore coach Neo Beng Siang was satisfied with the draw, pointing out that they avoided the Philippines and Malaysia until the knockout round.

Pot 1	Pot 2
Vietnam	Timor-Leste

== Team rosters ==
At the start of tournament, all nine participating countries had up to 12 players on their rosters.

- Cambodia
- Indonesia
- Singapore
- Philippines
- Malaysia
- Myanmar
- Timor-Leste
- Thailand
- Vietnam

== Competition format ==
- The preliminary round will be composed of two groups of either four or five teams each. Each team will play the teams within their group. The top two teams per group will advance to the knockout round. The other teams qualify to the classification round.
- Classification round:
  - 5th place: Third place teams play for fifth place.
  - 7th place: Fourth place teams play for seventh place.
  - 8th place: Fifth place team in Group B play for ninth place against the loser of the seventh place match.
- The knockout round is a single-elimination tournament, with a consolation game for the semifinals losers. In the knockout round, the winner of the third place game wins the bronze medal; the loser in the final is awarded the silver medal, while the winner wins the gold medal.

== Results ==
All times are Singapore Standard Time (UTC+8)

=== Preliminary round ===
==== Group A ====
The Philippines won all three preliminary round games, including a 105-point victory against debutants Timor-Leste. The game between Indonesia and Malaysia determined the other semifinalist from this group, a game where Indonesia came from behind to win handily.

Pos	Team	Pld	W	L	PF	PA	PD	Pts	Qualification
1	Philippines	3	3	0	307	121	+186	6	Advance to knockout round
2	Indonesia	3	2	1	254	161	+93	5	Advance to knockout round
3	Malaysia	3	1	2	184	195	−11	4	Qualification to 5th place match
4	Timor-Leste	3	0	3	70	338	−268	3	Qualification to 7th place match

Source: 28th Seagames 2015
Rules for classification: (1) Tournament points, (2) Head-to-head tournament points, (3) Head-to-head goal average, (4) Overall goal average, (5) Drawing of lots

9 June 2015
16:00

Report

Indonesia	135–21	Timor-Leste
Scoring by quarter: 32–4, 36–5, 31–8, 36–4
Pts: Sanjaya 20; Rebs: G. Gunawan 15; Asts: Dhyaksa 10		Pts: Pereira 10; Rebs: Pereira 5 Asts: Pereira 2

OCBC Arena Hall 1, Kallang
Referees: Goh Poh Seng (SIN), Win Naing Phyo (MYA), Yang Xiaoguang (CHN)

10 June 2015
13:00

Report

Indonesia	52–81	Philippines
Scoring by quarter: 4–14, 20–21, 10–25, 18–21
Pts: Sanjaya 9 Rebs: Enguio Lopez 7 Asts: Wisnu, R. Gunawan, Sitepu 2		Pts: Ravena 16; Rebs: Rosario 11; Asts: Amer, Douthit 3

OCBC Arena Hall 1, Kallang
Referees: Leong Chuen Wing (SIN), Thongchai Thaweewutsophon (THA), Chuang Chih Chun (TPE)

11 June 2015
16:00

Report

Philippines	100–48	Malaysia
Scoring by quarter: 20–9, 28–11, 27–15, 25–13
Pts: Vosotros 21; Rebs: Torres, Douthit 8 Asts: Ravena 6		Pts: Yeo 10; Rebs: Tian 5 Asts: Wen 3

OCBC Arena Hall 1, Kallang
Referees: Jontapa Nattapong (THA), Wu Xin (SIN), Yang Xiaoguang (CHN)

12 June 2015
14:00

Report

Malaysia	59–67	Indonesia
Scoring by quarter: 13–10, 11–7, 17–30, 18–20
Pts: Yeo 19; Rebs: Kuek 8 Asts: Tong 5		Pts: Dhyaksa 14; Rebs: Enguio Lopez 8 Asts: Dhyaksa, Sitepu, Wuysang 2

OCBC Arena Hall 1, Kallang
Referees: Win Naing Phyo (MYA), Thongchai Thaweewutsophon (THA), Yang Xiaoguang (CHN)

12 June 2015
18:00

Report

Philippines	126–21	Timor-Leste
Scoring by quarter: 40–3, 23–8, 36–5, 27–5
Pts: Rivero 24; Rebs: Thompson 9 Asts: Khobuntin 6		Pts: Miranda 6 Rebs: Da Silva Ribeiro 6 Asts: Pereira 2

OCBC Arena Hall 1, Kallang
Referees: Leong Chuen Wing (SIN), Jontapa Nattapong (THA), Lwin Htoo Wai (MYA)

13 June 2015
18:00

Report

Timor-Leste	28–77	Malaysia
Scoring by quarter: 4–27, 3–20, 8–16, 13–14
Pts: Pereira 8 Rebs: Pereira 15; Asts: Pereira 3		Pts: Liaw 12; Rebs: Choong, Koh 8 Asts: Tong 8

OCBC Arena Hall 1, Kallang
Referees: Wu Xin (SIN), Lwin Htoo Wai (MYA), Yuen Chun Yip (CHN)

==== Group B ====
Singapore won all four games to top the group, including the game against Thailand where Singapore closed out the third quarter with a 5–0 run to seal the win. The game determined which team will top the group. Cambodia, Vietnam and Myanmar were all eliminated from contention.

Pos	Team	Pld	W	L	PF	PA	PD	Pts	Qualification
1	Singapore (H)	4	4	0	357	201	+156	8	Advance to knockout round
2	Thailand	4	3	1	341	236	+105	7	Advance to knockout round
3	Cambodia	4	2	2	314	275	+39	6	Qualification to 5th place match
4	Vietnam	4	1	3	244	332	−88	5	Qualification to 7th place match
5	Myanmar	4	0	4	215	417	−202	4	Qualification to 8th place match

Source: 28th Seagames 2015
Rules for classification: (1) Tournament points, (2) Head-to-head tournament points, (3) Head-to-head goal average, (4) Overall goal average, (5) Drawing of lots
(H) Hosts

9 June 2015
11:00

Report

Cambodia	66–78	Thailand
Scoring by quarter: 12–21, 13–19, 19–18, 22–20
Pts: Toun 23; Rebs: Pek 7 Asts: Toun 5		Pts: Kongkum; Rebs: Chanthachon 12; Asts: Muangboon 5

OCBC Arena Hall 1, Kallang
Referees: Budi Marfan (INA), Joenard Garcia (PHI), Chuang Chih-Chun (TPE)

9 June 2015
20:00

Report

Singapore	131–33	Myanmar
Scoring by quarter: 41–10, 36–10, 25–6, 29–7
Pts: Low, Goh 17; Rebs: Lim S. 13; Asts: Oh 7		Pts: Min 12; Rebs: Justin 4 Asts: Myint 3

OCBC Arena Hall 1, Kallang
Referees: Donald Francis Quinn (INA), Tee Yong Sern (MAS), Yuen Chun Yip (CHN)

10 June 2015
11:00

Report

Myanmar	54–103	Cambodia
Scoring by quarter: 8–19, 23–21, 16–29, 7–34
Pts: Myint 17; Rebs: Myint, Min 9 Asts: Min 3		Pts: Pek 30; Rebs: Toun 26; Asts: Toun, Som 5

OCBC Arena Hall 1, Kallang
Referees: Donald Francis Quinn (INA), Tee Yong Sern (MAS), Ricor Buaron (PHI)

10 June 2015
20:00

Report

Vietnam	43–78	Singapore
Scoring by quarter: 9–23, 6–24, 12–20, 16–11
Pts: Triệu 12; Rebs: Tô 6 Asts: Triệu 4		Pts: Oh 17; Rebs: Low 10; Asts: Liew 4

OCBC Arena Hall 1, Kallang
Referees: Yang Xiaoguang (CHN), Joenard Garcia (PHI), Chu Wei Chuen (MAS)

11 June 2015
11:00

Report

Vietnam	45–108	Thailand
Scoring by quarter: 6–39, 17–21, 12–25, 10–23
Pts: Nguyen T. 18; Rebs: Nguyen T. 9 Asts: Ngô 2		Pts: Ghogar 19; Rebs: Chanthachon, Ghogar 9 Asts: Kruatiwa, Samerjai 3

OCBC Arena Hall 1, Kallang
Referees: Tee Yong Sern (MAS), Ricor Buaron (PHI), Yuen Chun Yip (CHN)

11 June 2015
20:00

Report

Singapore	83–67	Cambodia
Scoring by quarter: 31–19, 21–15, 21–15, 10–18
Pts: Liew, Ng 15; Rebs: Low 9 Asts: Liew 5		Pts: Pek 20; Rebs: Toun 15; Asts: Pek 2

OCBC Arena Hall 1, Kallang
Referees: Chu Wei Chuen (MAS), Budi Marfan (INA), Chuang Chih-Chun (TPE)

12 June 2015
10:00

Report

Myanmar	68–96	Vietnam
Scoring by quarter: 16–30, 14–20, 18–22, 20–24
Pts: Justin 24; Rebs: Myint 11; Asts: Myint 3		Pts: Triệu 33; Rebs: Nguyen T. 11; Asts: Ngô 8

OCBC Arena Hall 1, Kallang
Referees: Donald Francis Quinn (INA), Tee Yong Sern (MAS), Joenard Garcia (PHI)

12 June 2015
20:00

Report

Thailand	58–65	Singapore
Scoring by quarter: 12–23, 16–9, 16–17, 14–16
Pts: Apiromvilaichai 13; Rebs: Ghogar 9 Asts: Ghogar 4		Pts: Oh 16; Rebs: Low 9 Asts: Low 4

OCBC Arena Hall 1, Kallang
Referees: Chuang Chih-Chun (TPE), Ricor Buaron (PHI), Yuen Chun Yip (CHN)

13 June 2015
12:00

Report

Cambodia	78–60	Vietnam
Scoring by quarter: 17–15, 20–11, 24–18, 17–16
Pts: Ratana 20; Rebs: Ratana 8 Asts: Dar 6		Pts: Nguyen T., Triệu 17; Rebs: Nguyen T. 16; Asts: Ngô 3

OCBC Arena Hall 1, Kallang
Referees: Donald Francis Quinn (INA), Tee Yong Sern (MAS), Ricor Buaron (PHI)

13 June 2015
14:00

Report

Thailand	97–60	Myanmar
Scoring by quarter: 28–13, 30–17, 19–12, 20–18
Pts: Dasom 22; Rebs: Chanthachon 16; Asts: Samerjai 8		Pts: Justin 17; Rebs: Myint 7 Asts: Myint, Justin, Wai 3

OCBC Arena Hall 1, Kallang
Referees: Budi Marfan (INA), Chu Wei Chuen (MAS), Leong Chuen Wing (SIN)

=== Classification round ===
==== 7th place match ====
14 June 2015
10:00

Timor-Leste	29–80	Vietnam
Scoring by quarter: 8–21, 3–20, 8–18, 10–21
Pts: Da Silva Ribeiro 14; Rebs: Soares 10; Asts: Da Costa Martins 1		Pts: Triệu 23; Rebs: Pham, Triệu 8 Asts: Triệu 6

OCBC Arena Hall 1, Kallang
Referees: Thongcai Thaweewutsophon (THA), Donald Francis Quinn (INA), Chuen Wing Leong (SIN)

==== 5th–6th place match ====
14 June 2015
12:00

Report

Malaysia	62–56	Cambodia
Scoring by quarter: 11–10, 19–20, 10–14, 22–12
Pts: Kuek 11; Rebs: Yeo 10; Asts: Kuek, Kwaan 2		Pts: Em 14; Rebs: Toun 9 Asts: Pek, Ratana 2

OCBC Arena Hall 1, Kallang
Referees: Poh Seng Goh (INA), Budi Marfan (INA), Nattapong Jontapa (THA)

==== 8th–9th place match ====
15 June 2015
10:00

Report

Myanmar	83–57	Timor-Leste
Scoring by quarter: 23–14, 9–16, 15–7, 36–20
Pts: Myint 26; Rebs: Myint 16; Asts: Myint 5		Pts: Da Silva Ribeiro 16; Rebs: Das Dores 10; Asts: Pereira 6

OCBC Arena Hall 1, Kallang
Referees: Joenard Garcia (PHI), Ricor Buaron (PHI), Leong Chuen Wing (SIN)

=== Knockout round ===
Semi-finals
14 June – OCBC Arena Hall 1
Philippines	80
Thailand	75
14 June – OCBC Arena Hall 1
Singapore	74
Indonesia	87

Gold medal match
15 June – OCBC Arena Hall 1
Philippines	72
Indonesia	64
Bronze medal match
15 June – OCBC Arena Hall 1
Thailand	49
Singapore	54

==== Semifinals ====
The Thais opened the semifinals against the Philippines with an 11-point lead at halftime, the first time in the tournament that the Filipinos found themselves trailing at that point. Almond Vosotros scored on several three-pointers to help the Philippines trim the deficit. Kiefer Ravena scored on a three-point shot of his own with 16.5 seconds remaining in the game to advance to the gold medal game.

In their semifinal, Mario Wuysang led indonesia to a 12-point lead at halftime. The Singaporeans were frustrated by poor shooting. At the start of the third quarter, Indonesia lead increased to 19 points. However, Desmond Oh was taken out of the game due to a suspected concussion, and Singapore never had a fourth quarter run that saw Indonesia winning the game to face the Philippines for the gold medal.

14 June 2015
18:00

Report

Philippines	80–75	Thailand
Scoring by quarter: 14–22, 19–21, 26–13, 21–19
Pts: Rosario 27; Rebs: Rosario 12; Asts: Ferrer 4		Pts: Kruatiwa, Muangboon 15; Rebs: Apiromvilachai 5 Asts: Ghogar, Klahan 4

OCBC Arena Hall 1, Kallang
Referees: Yong Sern Tee (MAS), Naing Phyo Win (MYA), Yang Xiaoguang (CHN)

14 June 2015
20:00

Report

Singapore	74–87	Indonesia
Scoring by quarter: 17–24, 13–18, 19–20, 25–25
Pts: Liew 16; Rebs: Lim, Low, Ng, Goh 6 Asts: Wong 4		Pts: Santosa 16; Rebs: Wuysang, Enguio Lopez, Sitepu 5 Asts: Wuysang, R. Gunawan 3

OCBC Arena Hall 1, Kallang
Referees: Chuang Chih-Chun (TPE), Wei Chuen Chu (MAS), Yuen Chun Yip (CHN)

==== Bronze medal match ====
In the bronze medal game, the game started with both teams deadlocked after the first period. Thailand outscored the hosts in the second quarter to lead by six at the half. Singapore caught up with the Thais tying the game anew early in the fourth quarter at 41-all. The teams traded baskets, but Singapore converted several free-throws to seize a 5-point lead. Singapore maintained the lead until the end of the game to win the bronze medal.

15 June 2015
18:00

Report

Thailand	49–54	Singapore
Scoring by quarter: 14–14, 17–11, 10–13, 8–16
Pts: Ghogar 10; Rebs: Ghogar 9 Asts: Muangboon, Samerjai 2		Pts: Liew 18; Rebs: Low 9 Asts: Wong 6

OCBC Arena Hall 1, Kallang
Referees: Chuang Chih-Chun (TPE), Yuen Chun Yip (CHN), Budi Marfan (INA)

==== Gold medal match ====
Earlier in the tournament, the Philippines defeated Indonesia 81–52. The Filipinos started the game with a 7-point lead in the first quarter, and controlled the game until Indonesia had a 9–1 run midway through the fourth quarter to cut the lead to three. Ravena scored on a dunk to restore the five-point lead, and Mark Belo converted a couple of free-throws late in the fourth quarter to win the country's 29th gold medal in 2015 games, and the 17th gold medal out of 18 men's basketball tournaments.

15 June 2015
20:00

Report

Philippines	72–64	Indonesia
Scoring by quarter: 22–15, 17–11, 19–21, 14–17
Pts: Belo 22; Rebs: 4 players 5 Asts: Ravena 3		Pts: Kurniawan 16; Rebs: Wisnu, R. Gunawan 5 Asts: Wuysang 5

OCBC Arena Hall 1, Kallang
Referees: Poh Seng Goh (SIN), Yong Sern Tee (MAS), Yang Xiaoguang (CHN)

== Final standings ==
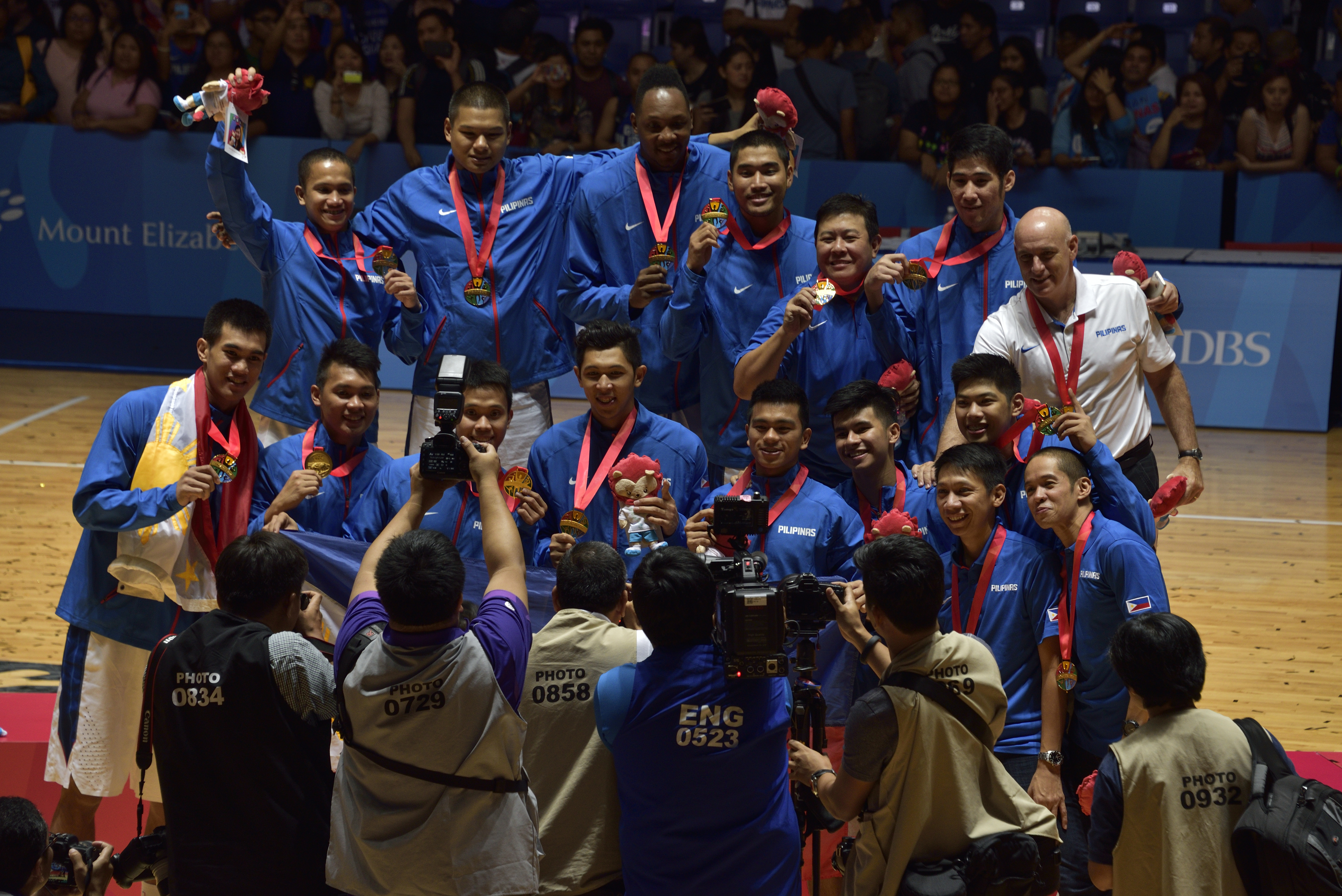
The Philippine national team – Champions of the men's basketball tournament

Rank	Team
1st place, gold medalist(s)	Philippines
2nd place, silver medalist(s)	Indonesia
3rd place, bronze medalist(s)	Singapore
4	Thailand
5	Malaysia
6	Cambodia
7	Vietnam
8	Myanmar
9	Timor-Leste

== See also ==
- Women's tournament
