= Basketball at the 2013 SEA Games =

19th SEA Games Basketball Tournament
- Naypyidaw 2013

Tournament details
- SEA Games: 2013 SEA Games
- Host nation: Myanmar
- City: Naypyidaw
- Venue: Zayar Thiri Indoor Stadium
- Duration: 8–16 December 2013

Men's tournament
- Teams: 7
Medals
Gold medalists	Philippines
Silver medalists	Thailand
Bronze medalists	Singapore

Women's tournament
- Teams: 5
Medals
Gold medalists	Thailand
Silver medalists	Philippines
Bronze medalists	Malaysia

Official website
- www.27seagames2013.com/sports/type/basketball

Tournaments
← 2011	2015 →

Basketball contests at the 2013 SEA Games were held from 8 December to 16 December 2013. This edition of the tournament featured both men's and women's tournaments. All matches took place at Zayyar Thiri Indoor Stadium in Naypyidaw.

Both men's and women's tournaments were in a round robin format; the team with the best record wins the gold medal. With a game to spare, the Philippines successfully defended the title for the men's competition. Thailand also defended their title as they win the women's division.

== Setting ==
All games took place at the Zayyar Thiri Indoor Stadium (near Zayarthiri Stadium) located in Naypyidaw. The stadium's capacity is about 3,000 with a dimension of 91,809 square feet.

== Competition format ==
Result	Points
Win	2
Loss	1
Loss via default*	1
Loss via forfeiture**	0

*The team has less than two players available to play on the court.
**A team cannot present five players at the start of the game, or its actions prevent play from being resumed.

In case teams are tied on points, the tiebreaking criteria are, in order of first application:

1. Results of the games involving the tied teams (head-to-head records)
2. Goal average of the games involving the tied teams
3. Goal average of all of the games played
4. Points scored
5. Drawing of lots

== Men's tournament ==
Team	W	L	PF	PA	PD	Pts
Philippines	6	0	580	351	+229	12
Thailand	5	1	448	423	+25	11
Singapore	4	2	455	367	+88	10
Malaysia	3	3	395	381	+14	9
Indonesia	2	4	379	369	+10	8
Cambodia	1	5	348	503	−155	7
Myanmar	0	6	306	517	−211	6

8 December 2013
Thailand	69 – 59	Singapore
Indonesia	53 – 61	Malaysia
Myanmar	60 – 75	Cambodia
9 December 2013
Cambodia	58 – 73	Malaysia
Singapore	75 – 88	Philippines
Indonesia	83 – 40	Myanmar
10 December 2013
Philippines	107 – 57	Cambodia
Malaysia	67 – 71	Singapore
Thailand	75 – 59	Indonesia
12 December 2013
Cambodia	67 – 80	Malaysia
Indonesia	48 – 62	Singapore
Myanmar	43 – 118	Philippines
13 December 2013
Singapore	99 – 43	Cambodia
Philippines	100 – 68	Thailand
Malaysia	69 – 42	Myanmar
14 December 2013
Indonesia	52 – 83	Philippines
Thailand	73 – 69	Malaysia
Myanmar	52 – 89	Singapore
15 December 2013
Cambodia	48 – 84	Indonesia
Malaysia	56 – 84	Philippines
16 December 2013
Myanmar	69 – 83	Thailand

== Women's tournament ==
Team	W	L	PF	PA	PD	Pts
Thailand	4	0	312	189	+123	8
Philippines	3	1	236	210	+26	7
Malaysia	2	2	304	217	+87	6
Indonesia	1	3	249	241	+8	5
Myanmar	0	4	134	378	−244	4

8 December 2013
Myanmar	39 – 104	Indonesia
9 December 2013
Malaysia	59 – 65	Philippines
10 December 2013
Philippines	36 – 75	Thailand
12 December 2013
Myanmar	32 – 95	Malaysia
13 December 2013
Indonesia	48 – 81	Malaysia
14 December 2013
Thailand	99 – 32	Myanmar
15 December 2013
Indonesia	45 – 55	Philippines
Malaysia	69 – 72	Thailand
16 December 2013
Thailand	66 – 52	Indonesia
Philippines	80 – 31	Myanmar

== Medal summary ==
=== Medal tally ===
Rank	Nation	Gold	Silver	Bronze	Total
1	Philippines	1	1	0	2
1	Thailand	1	1	0	2
3	Malaysia	0	0	1	1
3	Singapore	0	0	1	1
Totals (4 entries)		2	2	2	6

=== Medal winners ===
Division	Gold	Silver	Bronze
Men's Division	Philippines Kevin Alas; Matthew Ganuelas; Ronald Pascual; Jake Pascual; Bobby Ray Parks Jr. Jericho Cruz; Mac Belo; Marcus Douthit; Roi Sumang; Garvo Lanete; Kevin Ferrer; Kiefer Ravena	Thailand Anasawee Klaewnarong; Wattana Suttisin; Danai Kongkum; Kannawat Lertlaokul; Darongpan Apiromvilaichai; Darunpong Apiromvilaichai; Mana Jantuma; Wutipong Dasom; Ratdech Kruatiwa; Chanachon Klahan; Chaiwat Kaedum; Sukhdave Ghogar	Singapore Wong Wei Long; Ng Han Bin; Wu Qingde; Desmond Oh; Chase Tan; Hong Weijian; Larry Liew; Shengyu Lim; Yeong Wooi Khaw; Delvin Goh; Russel Low
Women's Division	Thailand Supavadee Kunchuan; Chalisa Chamnarnwaree; Penphan Yothanan; Nomjit Tunsaw; Kloyjai Phetsaenkha; Juthamas Jantakan; Suwimon Sangtad; Chonticha Chirdpetcharat; Pattrawadee Janthabut; Thidaporn Maihom; Juthathip Mathuros; Naruemol Banmoo	Philippines Joan Grajales; Chovi Borja; Merenciana Arayi; Camille Sambile; Melissa Jacob; Bernadette Mercado; Angeli Gloriani; Cindy Resultay; Cassandra Tioseco; Analyn Almazan; Denise Tiu	Malaysia Choo Sook Ping; Yong Shin Min; Ang Siew Teng; Yaakob Nur Izzati; Pang Hui Pin; Lee Siew Fun; Kew Suik May; Ting Eugene Chiau Teng; Goh Beng Fong; Hee Shook Ying; Yap Ching Yee

Preceded by 2011	Basketball at the SEA Games; 2013	Succeeded by 2015
