= Basketball Association of Singapore =

- Sport: Basketball
- Abbreviation: BAS
- Affiliation: FIBA
- Regional affiliation: FIBA Asia
- Affiliation date: 1961

Official website
- bas.org.sg
- (Singapore)

The Basketball Association of Singapore (BAS) is the governing body of basketball in Singapore.

== History ==
Basketball was introduced to Singapore as early as 1925 and was played in schools. The Singapore Basketball and Volleyball Association was established in 1934 to further promote the sport and the organization was responsible for organizing the Malaysia and Singapore Basketball Championship. The association was later replaced in 1939 by the Chinese Sports Improvement Council, which was considered by the Basketball Association of Singapore to be the first instance of its organization.

After the resolution of the World War II in 1946 which affected the promotion of basketball, Goh Chye Hin set up the Singapore Amateur Basketball Association (SABA). It's men's national team participated in the 1956 Summer Olympics.

SABA became a member of FIBA Asia in 1961 and its men's team began participating in the ABC Championship (now FIBA Asia Cup). It renamed itself as the Basketball Association of Singapore (BAS) in 1967.

== Tournaments organised ==
- National Basketball League
- Women's National Basketball League
- National Basketball Developmental League
- Merlion Cup
- Junior Basketball Championships Boys (U-18, U-17, U-16, U-15)
- Junior Basketball Championships Girls (U-18, U-17, U-16, U-15)
- ActiveSG-BAS National Masters

== National team ==
- Men's (Senior)

=== Current roster ===
Roster for the 2019 SEA Games.

Singapore National Basketball Team roster
Players
Coaches

Pos.	No.	Name	Age – Date of birth	Height	Club
C	0	V Lavin Raj	19 – 27 June 2000	2.00 m (6 ft 7 in)	Xin Hua Sports Club	(Singapore)
G	2	Isaac Jui Kwang Low	25 – 5 March 1994	1.91 m (6 ft 3 in)		(Singapore)
G	5	Wei Long Wong	31 – 18 August 1988	1.74 m (5 ft 9 in)	Adroit	(Singapore)
G/F	7	Xing Yuan Han	23 – 31 May 1996	1.89 m (6 ft 2 in)	Xin Hua Sports Club	(Singapore)
G	9	Vignesh Rengarajan	21 – 8 November 1998	1.83 m (6 ft 0 in)	Siglap Basketball Club	(Singapore)
G/F	10	Leon Kwek	23 – 19 August 1996	1.88 m (6 ft 2 in)	SAFSA	(Singapore)
G	11	Larry Liew	26 – 7 May 1993	1.91 m (6 ft 3 in)	Adroit	(Singapore)
F	22	Kelvin Lim	23 – 28 September 1996	1.90 m (6 ft 3 in)	SBPHK Hornets	(Singapore)
C	23	Delvin Goh	24 – 14 April 1995	2.00 m (6 ft 7 in)	Siglap Basketball Club	(Singapore)
G	24	Qing Huang Toh	24 – 16 January 1995	1.83 m (6 ft 0 in)	Adroit	(Singapore)
G	30	Zhong Han Wong	22 – 11 August 1997	1.83 m (6 ft 0 in)	Adroit	(Singapore)
F	83	Chase Tan	29 – 1 April 1990	1.86 m (6 ft 1 in)	SBPHK Hornets	(Singapore)

Head coach

Hsu Tung Ching

- (Singapore) -

Assistant coach(es)

Koh Meng Koon

- (Singapore) -

Legend

- (C) Team captain
- Club field describes current pro club

=== Past roster ===
Roster for the 2017 SEABA Championship.

Singapore National Basketball Team roster
Players
Coaches

Pos.	No.	Name	Age – Date of birth	Height	Club
G	01	Jun Yuan Lim	19 – 15 January 1997	1.77 m (5 ft 10 in)	Siglap Basketball Club	(Singapore)
G	04	Johrathon Cheok	20 – 17 April 1996	1.81 m (5 ft 11 in)	Siglap Basketball Club	(Singapore)
G	05	Wei Long Wong	28 – 18 August 1988	1.74 m (5 ft 9 in)	Adroit	(Singapore)
G/F	09	John Jing Lun Ng	22 – 4 September 1994	1.90 m (6 ft 3 in)	Xin Hua Sports Club	(Singapore)
F	10	Leon Kwek	20 – 19 August 1996	1.88 m (6 ft 2 in)	Adroit	(Singapore)
G	11	Hua Sen Larry Liew	23 – 7 May 1993	1.91 m (6 ft 3 in)	Adroit	(Singapore)
F	14	Lyon Chia	20 – 7 December 1996	1.88 m (6 ft 2 in)	Xin Hua Sports Club	(Singapore)
F	17	Han Bin Ng	27 – 13 January 1989	1.94 m (6 ft 4 in)	Adroit	(Singapore)
C	23	Delvin Goh	21 – 14 April 1995	2.02 m (6 ft 8 in)	SAFSA	(Singapore)
C	26	Justin Lim	22 – 17 November 1994	1.94 m (6 ft 4 in)	Siglap Basketball Club	(Singapore)
C	34	V Lavin Raj	16 – 27 June 2000	2.00 m (6 ft 7 in)	Kai Xuan	(Singapore)
F	83	Chase Tan	26 – 1 April 1990	1.87 m (6 ft 2 in)	SBPHK Hornets	(Singapore)

Head coach

Frank Arsego (Aus)

Assistant coach(es)

Joe So / Neo Nam Kheng

- (Singapore) -

Legend

- (C) Team captain
- Club field describes current pro club

=== Depth chart ===
Pos.	Starting 5	Bench 1	Bench 2
C	Russel Low	Delvin Goh	Raj V Lavin
PF	Wu qingde	Lim Shengyu	Lim Kelvin Hong Da
SF	Ng Han Bin	Leon Kwek
SG	Hong Weijian	Desmond Oh
PG	Wei Long Wong	Liew Larry Hua Sen

Roster at the FIBA Asia Cup 2021 Pre-Qualifiers (Eastern Region).

Singapore National Basketball Team roster
Players
Coaches

Pos.	No.	Name	Age – Date of birth	Height	Club
C	0	V Lavin Raj	18 – 27 June 2000	2.00 m (6 ft 7 in)	Xin Hua Sports club	(Singapore)
G	1	Jin Kai Au	26 – 13 November 1992	1.74 m (5 ft 9 in)
G/F	7	Xing Yuan Han	22 – 31 May 1996	1.89 m (6 ft 2 in)	Xin Hua Sports Club	(Singapore)
G/F	10	Leon Kwek	22 – 19 August 1996	1.88 m (6 ft 2 in)	SAFSA	(Singapore)
G	11	Larry Liew	25 – 7 May 1993	1.91 m (6 ft 3 in)	Adroit	(Singapore)
G	13	Zhen Qiang Zhou	25 – 11 March 1993	1.77 m (5 ft 10 in)	Adroit	(Singapore)
F	22	Kelvin Lim	22 – 28 September 1996	1.90 m (6 ft 3 in)	SBPHK Hornets	(Singapore)
C	23	Delvin Goh	23 – 14 April 1995	2.00 m (6 ft 7 in)	Siglap Basketball Club	(Singapore)
G	24	Qing Huang Toh	23 – 16 January 1995	1.83 m (6 ft 0 in)	Adroit	(Singapore)
G	30	Zhong Han Wong	21 – 11 August 1997	1.83 m (6 ft 0 in)	Adroit	(Singapore)
C	33	Bing Hong Kenneth Low	28 – 7 May 1990	1.93 m (6 ft 4 in)	Xin Hua Sports Club	(Singapore)
F	83	Chase Tan	28 – 1 April 1990	1.86 m (6 ft 1 in)	SBPHK Hornets	(Singapore)

Head coach

- (Singapore) Hsu Tung Ching

Legend

- (C) Team captain
- Club field describes current pro club

(U18/U19, U16/U17, 3x3)

- Women's (Senior, U18/U19, U16/U17, 3x3)
