= Basketball at the 2013 SEA Games – Men's tournament =

Tournament details
- Host country: Myanmar
- Dates: 8–16 December
- Teams: 7 (from 1 federation)
- Venue: 1 (in 1 host city)

Final positions
- Champions: Philippines (16th title)

Tournament statistics
- Top scorer: (Cambodia) Dominic Dar (19.5)
- Top rebounds: (Cambodia) Ratana (11.7)
- Top assists: (Malaysia) Ban Sin (5.0)

The men's tournament in Basketball at the 2013 SEA Games in Naypyidaw began on 8 December and ended on 16 December. All games were held in the Zayar Thiri Indoor Stadium which hosted both men's and women's tournaments. The Philippines successfully defended the title for the sixteenth time as they went undefeated in the competition.

== Venue ==
The Zayar Thiri Indoor Stadium is located in Naypyidaw. It was the host stadium of the tournament for both men's and women's basketball. The stadium's capacity is about 3,000 with an area of 8,529.3 square metres (91,809 ft^{2}). It was also the hosts of volleyball, judo, vovinam and pencak silat of the games.

== Competition format ==
All seven teams will play their opponents once. Unlike the past Southeast Asian Games, there were no knockout stages in the tournament. The team that finishes the best record will win the title.

Result	Points
Win	2
Loss	1
Loss via default*	1
Loss via forfeiture**	0

*The team has fewer than two players available to play on the court at some point during the game.
**A team cannot put forward at least five players at the start of the game, or its own actions prevent play from being resumed.

In case teams are tied on points, the tiebreaking criteria are used, in order of first application:

1. Results of the games involving the tied teams (head-to-head records)
2. Goal average of the games involving the tied teams
3. Goal average of all of the games played
4. Points scored
5. Drawing of lots

== Results ==
All times are Myanmar Standard Time (+6:30).

Pos	Team	Pld	W	L	PF	PA	PD	Pts	Final Result
1	Philippines	6	6	0	580	351	+229	12	Gold medal
2	Thailand	6	5	1	448	423	+25	11	Silver medal
3	Singapore	6	4	2	455	367	+88	10	Bronze medal
4	Malaysia	6	3	3	395	381	+14	9	
5	Indonesia	6	2	4	379	369	+10	8	
6	Cambodia	6	1	5	348	503	−155	7	
7	Myanmar (H)	6	0	6	306	517	−211	6	

Rules for classification: (1) Tournament points, (2) Head-to-head tournament points, (3) Head-to-head goal average, (4) Overall goal average, (5) Drawing of lots
(H) Hosts

8 December 2013
10:00

Report PDF

Thailand	69–59	Singapore
Scoring by quarter: 14–16, 23–13, 14–10, 18–20
Scoring by half: 37–29, 32–30
Pts: Kongkum 21; Rebs: Suttisin 2 Asts: D.A. Apiromvilaichai 5		Pts: Hanbin 13; Rebs: four players 2 Asts: W.L. Wong 3

Zayar Thiri Indoor Stadium, Naypyidaw
Referees: Ceciline Michael Vino (IND), Mr. Herman (INA), Linn Muang (MYA)

8 December 2013
12:00

Report PDF

Indonesia	53–61	Malaysia
Scoring by quarter: 9–18, 6–15, 22–6, 16–22
Scoring by half: 15–33, 38–28
Pts: Prastawa 24; Rebs: Gemilang 7 Asts: Gemilang 7		Pts: Fai 17; Rebs: Fai 7 Asts: two players 4

Zayar Thiri Indoor Stadium, Naypyidaw
Referees: Yuji Higashi (JPN), Sim Siong Chuan (SIN), Dominique Pomar (PHI)

8 December 2013
16:00

Report PDF

Myanmar	60–75	Cambodia
Scoring by quarter: 11–42, 18–12, 18–12, 13–9
Scoring by half: 29–54, 31–21
Pts: Jia 22; Rebs: S.M. Min 8 Asts: three players 4		Pts: Ratana 32; Rebs: Boroth 16; Asts: three players 6

Zayar Thiri Indoor Stadium, Naypyidaw
Referees: Yeung Ying Wai (HKG), Thongchai Thaweewutsophon (THA), Chang Yee Chuan (MAS)

9 December 2013
12:00

Report PDF

Cambodia	58–73	Malaysia
Scoring by quarter: 11–7, 17–28, 13–17, 17–21
Scoring by half: 28–35, 30–38
Pts: Ratana 22; Rebs: Boroth 20; Asts: Boroth 5		Pts: Fai 16; Rebs: two players 10; Asts: Ban Sin 8

Zayar Thiri Indoor Stadium, Naypyidaw
Referees: Yu Jung (TPE), Haryanto Sutaryo (INA), Naing Phyo Win (MYA)

9 December 2013
14:00

Report PDF

Singapore	75–88	Philippines
Scoring by quarter: 22–13, 11–20, 25–31, 17–24
Scoring by half: 33–33, 42–55
Pts: W.L. Wong 23; Rebs: Liew 8 Asts: W.L. Wong 6		Pts: Belo 16; Rebs: three players 10; Asts: Parks 5

Zayar Thiri Indoor Stadium, Naypyidaw
Referees: Yuji Higashi (JPN), Preeda Muongmee (THA), Htoo Wai Lwin (MYA)

9 December 2013
16:00

Report PDF

Indonesia	83–40	Myanmar
Scoring by quarter: 31–9, 16–12, 21–4, 15–15
Scoring by half: 47–21, 36–19
Pts: five players 11; Rebs: Pamungkas 11; Asts: four players 4		Pts: Jia 10; Rebs: Jia 11; Asts: Kyaw 4

Zayar Thiri Indoor Stadium, Naypyidaw
Referees: Ceciline Michael Vino (IND), Chang Yee Chuan (MAS), Ting Pick Kieng (MAS)

10 December 2013
12:00

Report PDF

Philippines	107–57	Cambodia
Scoring by quarter: 25–16, 19–9, 32–14, 31–18
Scoring by half: 44–25, 63–32
Pts: Belo 17; Rebs: Parks 11; Asts: two players 5		Pts: Dominic Dar 27; Rebs: Boroth 17; Asts: three players 2

Zayar Thiri Indoor Stadium, Naypyidaw
Referees: Ceciline Michael Vino (IND), Sim Siong Chuan (SIN), Thongchai Thaweewutsophon (THA)

10 December 2013
14:00

Report PDF

Malaysia	67–71	Singapore
Scoring by quarter: 19–19, 13–19, 19–20, 16–13
Scoring by half: 32–38, 35–33
Pts: Koh Wei 16; Rebs: Kwaan 7 Asts: Ban Sin 6		Pts: W.L. Wong 17; Rebs: W.L. Wong 4 Asts: two players 3

Zayar Thiri Indoor Stadium, Naypyidaw
Referees: Chan Kin Pong (MAC), Yeung Ying Wai (HKG), Maung Linn (MYA)

10 December 2013
16:00

Report PDF

Thailand	75–59	Indonesia
Scoring by quarter: 17–11, 19–14, 21–17, 18–17
Scoring by half: 36–25, 39–34
Pts: Kruatiwa 16; Rebs: Ghogar 16; Asts: Kongkum 5		Pts: Gemilang 14; Rebs: three players 5 Asts: two players 3

Zayar Thiri Indoor Stadium, Naypyidaw
Referees: Yuji Higashi (JPN), Yu Jung (TPE), Chang Yee Chuan (MAS)

12 December 2013
10:00

Report PDF

Cambodia	67–80	Malaysia
Scoring by quarter: 16–20, 11–24, 17–20, 23–16
Scoring by half: 27–45, 40–35
Pts: Dominic Dar 41; Rebs: Ratana 8 Asts: Phatara 4		Pts: Kongkum 16; Rebs: Klahan 9 Asts: D.A. Apiromvilaichai 5

Zayar Thiri Indoor Stadium, Naypyidaw
Referees: Kin Pong Chan (MAC), Pick Kieng Ting (MAS), Naing Phyo Win (MYA)

12 December 2013
12:00

Report PDF

Indonesia	48–62	Singapore
Scoring by quarter: 12–11, 6–20, 19–17, 11–14
Scoring by half: 18–31, 30–31
Pts: three players 9 Rebs: Bonanza Sitepu 6 Asts: Febri Utomo 4		Pts: W.L. Wong 14; Rebs: Wenqiang 7 Asts: Liew 4

Zayar Thiri Indoor Stadium, Naypyidaw
Referees: Ying Wai Yeung (HKG), Ceciline Michael Vino (IND), Dominique Pomar (PHI)

12 December 2013
16:00

Report PDF

Myanmar	43–118	Philippines
Scoring by quarter: 14–34, 13–28, 10–26, 6–30
Scoring by half: 27–62, 16–56
Pts: Than Aung 11; Rebs: Than Aung 7 Asts: Tun Tun 6		Pts: R. Pascual 20; Rebs: three players 5 Asts: Sumang 6

Zayar Thiri Indoor Stadium, Naypyidaw
Referees: Jung Yu (TPE), Mr. Herman (INA), Preeda Muongmee (THA)

13 December 2013
12:00

Report PDF

Singapore	99–43	Cambodia
Scoring by quarter: 16–14, 23–9, 22–11, 38–9
Scoring by half: 39–23, 60–20
Pts: Liew 21; Rebs: two players 9 Asts: W.L. Wong 5		Pts: Dominic Dar 15; Rebs: Ratana 6 Asts: two players 2

Zayar Thiri Indoor Stadium, Naypyidaw
Referees: Kin Pong Chan (MAC), Yee Chuan Chang (MAS), Htoo Wai Lwin (MYA)

13 December 2013
14:00

Report PDF

Philippines	100–68	Thailand
Scoring by quarter: 29–17, 25–16, 31–9, 15–26
Scoring by half: 54–33, 46–35
Pts: Ferrer 23; Rebs: J. Pascual 10; Asts: Sumang 6		Pts: Ghogar 11; Rebs: three players 5 Asts: two players 2

Zayar Thiri Indoor Stadium, Naypyidaw
Referees: Yuji Higashi (JPN), Linn Maung (MYA), Haryanto Sutaryo (INA)

13 December 2013
16:00

Report PDF

Malaysia	69–42	Myanmar
Scoring by quarter: 16–7, 18–8, 16–18, 19–9
Scoring by half: 34–15, 35–27
Pts: Kuek 13; Rebs: Kuek 6 Asts: two players 4		Pts: Jia 8 Rebs: Jia 10; Asts: two players 2

Zayar Thiri Indoor Stadium, Naypyidaw
Referees: Dominique Pomar (PHI), Thongchai Thaweewutsophon (THA), Siong Chuan Sim (SIN)

14 December 2013
10:00

Report PDF

Indonesia	52–83	Philippines
Scoring by quarter: 18–18, 16–22, 9–27, 9–16
Scoring by half: 34–40, 18–43
Pts: Prawiro 14; Rebs: Gunawan 5 Asts: Prawiro 4		Pts: Douthit 11; Rebs: Douthit 11; Asts: Sumang 3

Zayar Thiri Indoor Stadium, Naypyidaw
Referees: Ceciline Michael Vino (IND), Naing Phyo Win (MYA), Pick Kieng Ting (MAS)

14 December 2013
12:00

Report PDF

Thailand	73–69	Malaysia
Scoring by quarter: 20–16, 25–16, 15–15, 13–22
Scoring by half: 45–32, 28–37
Pts: Kruatiwa 24; Rebs: Jantuma 10; Asts: Jantuma 6		Pts: Fai 27; Rebs: Kuek 11; Asts: Ban Sin 3

Zayar Thiri Indoor Stadium, Naypyidaw
Referees: Ying Wai Yeung (HKG), Yuji Higashi (JPN), Mr. Herman (INA)

14 December 2013
16:00

Report PDF

Myanmar	52–89	Singapore (bronze)
Scoring by quarter: 10–34, 11–19, 14–20, 17–16
Scoring by half: 21–53, 31–36
Pts: Jia 17; Rebs: two players 6 Asts: three players 2		Pts: Hanbin 20; Rebs: Hanbin 8 Asts: W.L. Long 5

Zayar Thiri Indoor Stadium, Naypyidaw
Referees: Jung Yu (TPE), Haryanto Sutaryo (INA), Bohui Kim (KOR)

15 December 2013
14:00

Report PDF

Cambodia	48–84	Indonesia
Scoring by quarter: 13-23, 11-21, 18-17, 6-23
Scoring by half: 24-44, 24-40
Pts: Ratana 24; Rebs: Ratana 10; Asts: Ratana 3		Pts: Prawiro 19; Rebs: two players 9 Asts: Gemilang 5

Zayar Thiri Indoor Stadium, Naypyidaw
Referees: Ceciline Michael Vino (IND), Preeda Muongmee (THA), Htoo Wai Lwin (MYA)

15 December 2013
16:00

Report PDF

Malaysia	56–84	Philippines (gold)
Scoring by quarter: 15-21, 19-22, 15-25, 7-16
Scoring by half: 34-43, 22-41
Pts: Khee Ong 11; Rebs: Kuek 7 Asts: Ban Sin 5		Pts: Parks 18; Rebs: Douthit 7 Asts: Ravena 6

Zayar Thiri Indoor Stadium, Naypyidaw
Referees: Kin Pong Chan (MAC), Haryanto Sutaryo (INA), Linn Maung (MYA)

16 December 2013
16:00

Report PDF

Myanmar	69–83	Thailand (silver)
Scoring by quarter: 14-24, 14-27, 16-18, 25-14
Scoring by half: 28-51, 41-32
Pts: Than Aung 14; Rebs: Than Aung 9 Asts: Htwe 5		Pts: Dasom 14; Rebs: Klaewnarong 10; Asts: two players 4

Zayar Thiri Indoor Stadium, Naypyidaw
Referees: Ying Wai Yeung (HKG), Dominique Pomar (PHI), Mr. Herman (INA)

== Statistical leaders ==
These are some statistics from the tournament which are top ten averages in points, rebounds and assists. Anthony Dominic Dar from Cambodia led the average points table due to his 117-point performance in 6 games. His teammate Sak Ratana, became first in the tournament's rebounds per game. Malaysia's Ooi Ban Sin led the assists per game with a total of 30, and an average of five.

In other statistics, Anthony Dominic Dar led the free throws percentage at 95%. Ratdech Kruatiwa became number one in outside shooting as he shot 54.8% beyond the three-point line. Sak Ratana also led in offensive and defensive rebounding made, steals and in turnovers. Adhi Pratama Prasetyo Putra and Thach Boroth were both tied at 19, as they made the most fouls in the competition. Marcus Douthit from the Philippines has made the most blocks in the tourney at seven.

Points

Pos.	Name	G	Pts.	PPG
1	(Cambodia) Anthony Dominic Dar	6	117	19.5
2	(Cambodia) Sak Ratana	6	116	19.3
3	(Singapore) Wei Long Wong	6	79	13.2
4	(Thailand) Ratdech Kruatiwa	5	65	13.0
5	(Malaysia) Shee Fai Loh	6	76	12.7
6	(Myanmar) Wang Jia	6	74	12.3
7	(Philippines) Mac Belo	6	72	12.0
7	(Indonesia) Xaverius Prawiro	6	72	12.0
8	(Thailand) Danai Kongkum	6	70	11.7
8	(Philippines) Kevin Ferrer	6	70	11.7
9	(Singapore) Ng Han Bin	6	65	10.8
10	(Philippines) Bobby Ray Parks Jr.	6	60	10.0

Rebounds

Pos.	Name	G	Reb.	RPG
1	(Cambodia) Sak Ratana	6	70	11.7
2	(Cambodia) Thach Boroth	6	64	10.7
3	(Philippines) Marcus Douthit	6	44	7.3
4	(Cambodia) Anthony Dominic Dar	6	42	7.0
4	(Myanmar) Thein Than Aung	6	42	7.0
4	(Myanmar) Wang Jia	6	42	7.0
5	(Indonesia) Galank Gunawan	4	25	6.3
6	(Philippines) Mac Belo	6	35	5.8
7	(Malaysia) Tian Yuan Kuek	6	34	5.7
8	(Thailand) Sukhdave Ghogar	6	33	5.5
9	(Indonesia) Chrismas Bonanza Sitepu	6	32	5.3
10	(Philippines) Ronald Pascual	6	31	5.2

Assists

Pos.	Name	G	Ast.	APG
1	(Malaysia) Ooi Ban Sin	6	30	5.0
2	(Philippines) Roi Sumang	6	24	4.0
3	(Singapore) Wei Long Wong	6	23	3.8
4	(Philippines) Bobby Ray Parks Jr.	6	20	3.3
5	(Indonesia) Kaleb Ramot Gemilang	6	19	3.2
6	(Thailand) Mana Jantuma	6	18	3.0
7	(Philippines) Kiefer Ravena	6	17	2.8
8	(Malaysia) Eng Heng Soo	6	16	2.7
8	(Philippines) Marcus Douthit	6	16	2.7
8	(Cambodia) Sak Ratana	6	16	2.7
8	(Cambodia) Thach Boroth	6	16	2.7
8	(Singapore) Desmond Oh	6	16	2.7
9	(Thailand) Darongpan Apiromvilaichai	6	15	2.5
9	(Philippines) Kevin Alas	6	15	2.5
9	(Myanmar) Sei Thu Tun Tun	6	15	2.5
10	(Singapore) Larry Liew	6	14	2.3
10	(Myanmar) Kyi Htwe	6	14	2.3
10	(Indonesia) Xaverius Prawiro	6	14	2.3

== Medal winners ==
The Philippines had clinched a gold place finish when Malaysia lost to Thailand, but even so, they won all their games. Thailand grabbed their eighth silver medal with a win over Malaysia which replaced them in second place. After 34 years, since the 1979 Southeast Asian Games, the Singaporeans got their second medal in history with a victory over the host nation.

Med
NOC/Names
Med
NOC/Names
Med
NOC/Names

Philippines

Thailand

Singapore

Kevin Alas
Matthew Ganuelas
Ronald Pascual
Bobby Ray Parks Jr.
Jericho Cruz
Mac Belo
Marcus Douthit
Roi Sumang
Garvo Lanete
Kevin Ferrer
Kiefer Ravena

Anasawee Klaewnarong
Wattana Suttisin
Danai Kongkum
Kannawat Lertlaokul
Darongpan Apiromvilaichai
Darunpong Apiromvilaichai
Mana Jantuma
Wutipong Dasom
Ratdech Kruatiwa
Chanachon Klahan
Chaiwat Kaedum
Sukhdave Ghogar

Wong Wei Long
Hanbin Ng
Wu Qingde
Desmond Oh
Tan Chin Hong
Hong Weijian
Larry Liew
Lim Shengyu
Yeong Wooi Khaw
Delvin Goh Kok Chiang
Russel Low Wenqiang

== See also ==
- Women's tournament
