= Basketball at the 2013 SEA Games – Women's tournament =

Tournament details
- Host country: Myanmar
- Dates: 8 – 16 December
- Teams: 5 (from 1 federation)
- Venue: 1 (in 1 host city)

Final positions
- Champions: Thailand (4th title)

Tournament statistics
- Top scorer: (Thailand) Jantakan (15.8)
- Top rebounds: (Philippines) Almazan (10.5)
- Top assists: (Malaysia) Pang (4.3) (Thailand) Mathuros (4.3)
- PPG (Team): Thailand (78.0)

Official website
- 27th Southeast Asian Games

The women's tournament in Basketball at the 2013 SEA Games in Naypyidaw began on 8 December and ended on 16 December. All games were held in the Zayar Thiri Indoor Stadium which for both men's and women's tournaments.

== Venue ==
The Zayar Thiri Indoor Stadium is located in Naypyidaw. It was the host stadium of the tournament for both men's and women's basketball. The stadium's capacity is about 3,000 with a dimension of 91,809 square feet. It was also the hosts of volleyball, judo, vovinam and pencak silat of the games.

== Competition format ==
All seven teams will play their opponents once. Unlike, the past Southeast Asian Games, there has been no knockout stages in the tournament. The team that finishes the best record will win the title.

Result	Points
Win	2
Loss	1
Loss via default*	1
Loss via forfeiture**	0

*The team has fewer than two players available to play on the court at some point during the game.
**A team cannot put forward at least five players at the start of the game, or its own actions prevent play from being resumed.

In case teams are tied on points, the tiebreaking criteria are used, in order of first application:

1. Results of the games involving the tied teams (head-to-head records)
2. Goal average of the games involving the tied teams
3. Goal average of all of the games played
4. Points scored
5. Drawing of lots

== Results ==
All times are Myanmar Standard Time (UTC+06:30).

Pos	Team	Pld	W	L	PF	PA	PD	Pts	Final Result
1	Thailand	4	4	0	312	189	+123	8	Gold medal
2	Philippines	4	3	1	236	210	+26	7	Silver medal
3	Malaysia	4	2	2	304	217	+87	6	Bronze medal
4	Indonesia	4	1	3	249	241	+8	5	
5	Myanmar (H)	4	0	4	134	378	−244	4	

Rules for classification: (1) Tournament points, (2) Head-to-head tournament points, (3) Head-to-head goal average, (4) Overall goal average, (5) Drawing of lots
(H) Hosts

8 December 2013
14:00

Report PDF

Myanmar	39–104	Indonesia
Scoring by quarter: 9–26, 6–25, 11–26, 13–27
Scoring by half: 15–51, 24–53
Pts: Thwe 11; Rebs: Thwe 13; Asts: Tin Yee 4		Pts: Ayuningrum 19; Rebs: Ibo 7 Asts: Tsarine 7

Zayar Thiri Indoor Stadium, Naypyidaw
Referees: Yoko Tomita (JPN), Jung Yu (TPE), Bohui Kim (KOR)

9 December 2013
10:00

Report PDF

Malaysia	59–65	Philippines
Scoring by quarter: 6-19, 17-9, 15-19, 21-18
Scoring by half: 23-28, 36-37
Pts: Goh 14; Rebs: two players 5 Asts: Pang 6		Pts: Arayi 14; Rebs: Almazan 6 Asts: three players 3

Zayar Thiri Indoor Stadium, Naypyidaw
Referees: Kim Bo-Hui (KOR), Yoko Tomita (JPN), Watcharin Padungratchadakit (THA)

10 December 2013
10:00

Report PDF

Philippines	36–75	Thailand
Scoring by quarter: 4-18, 9-17, 11-18, 12-22
Scoring by half: 13-35, 23-40
Pts: Almazan 9 Rebs: Almazan 15; Asts: two players 2		Pts: Jantakan 22; Rebs: Yothanan 13; Asts: Mathuros 6

Zayar Thiri Indoor Stadium, Naypyidaw
Referees: Yoko Tomita (JPN), Ho Shuet Mei (SIN), Soe Soe Lwin (MYA)

12 December 2013
14:00

Report PDF

Myanmar	32–95	Malaysia
Scoring by quarter: 13-30, 2-29, 10-15, 7-21
Scoring by half: 15-59, 17-36
Pts: Thwe 13; Rebs: Lin 7 Asts: Thwe 3		Pts: two players 14; Rebs: two players 9 Asts: Yaakob 7

Zayar Thiri Indoor Stadium, Naypyidaw
Referees: Bohui Kim (KOR), Shuet Mei Ho (SIN), Editha Botecario (PHI)

13 December 2013
10:00

Report PDF

Indonesia	48–81	Malaysia
Scoring by quarter: 15-16, 15-21, 7-18, 11-26
Scoring by half: 30-37, 18-44
Pts: Ibo 14; Rebs: Ibo 12; Asts: Ayuningrum 3		Pts: two players 16; Rebs: Yong 8 Asts: Pang 8

Zayar Thiri Indoor Stadium, Naypyidaw
Referees: Yoko Tomita (JPN), Bohui Kim (KOR), Lwin Soe Soe (MYA)

14 December 2013
14:00

Report PDF

Thailand	99–32	Myanmar
Scoring by quarter: 22-9, 25-6, 29-4, 23-13
Scoring by half: 47-15, 52-17
Pts: three players 14; Rebs: Mathuros 8 Asts: two players 5		Pts: Thwe 10; Rebs: Thwe 11; Asts: three players 1

Zayar Thiri Indoor Stadium, Naypyidaw
Referees: Yoko Tomita (JPN), Editha Botecario (PHI), Shuet Mei Ho (SIN)

15 December 2013
10:00

Report PDF

Indonesia	45–55	Philippines
Scoring by quarter: 15-15, 12-17, 11-10, 7-13
Scoring by half: 27-32, 18-23
Pts: Anggraeni 20; Rebs: Ayuningrum 5 Asts: three players 2		Pts: Tioesco 12; Rebs: Almazan 9 Asts: Arayi 4

Zayar Thiri Indoor Stadium, Naypyidaw
Referees: Yoko Tomita (JPN), Watcharin Padungratchadakit (THA), Jung Yu (TPE)

15 December 2013
12:00

Report PDF

Malaysia	69–72	Thailand
Scoring by quarter: 9-20, 21-18, 18-26, 21-8
Scoring by half: 30-38, 39-34
Pts: Pang 22; Rebs: Pang 10; Asts: two players 4		Pts: Banmoo 20; Rebs: two players 6 Asts: Chirdpetcharat 5

Zayar Thiri Indoor Stadium, Naypyidaw
Referees: Bohui Kim (KOR), Yuji Higashi (JPN), Editha Botecario (PHI)

16 December 2013
12:00

Report PDF

Thailand	66–52	Indonesia
Scoring by quarter: 13-22, 25-4, 13-11, 15-15
Scoring by half: 38-26, 28-26
Pts: Banmoo 16; Rebs: Yothanan 10; Asts: Mathuros 7		Pts: two players 9 Rebs: Ayuningrum 6 Asts: Rahmawati 6

Zayar Thiri Indoor Stadium, Naypyidaw
Referees: Jung Yu (TPE), Kin Pong Chan (MAC), Lwin Soe Soe (MYA)

16 December 2013
14:00

Report PDF

Philippines	80–31	Myanmar
Scoring by quarter: 21-8, 16-8, 31-10, 12-5
Scoring by half: 37-16, 43-15
Pts: Sambile 22; Rebs: Almazan 12; Asts: Resultay 5		Pts: Tin Yee 11; Rebs: two players 6 Asts: Thwe 2

Zayar Thiri Indoor Stadium, Naypyidaw
Referees: Bohui Kim (KOR), Yee Chuan Chang (MAS), Shuet Mei Ho (SIN)

== Medal winners ==
Med
NOC/Names
Med
NOC/Names
Med
NOC/Names

Thailand

Philippines

Malaysia

Supavadee Kunchuan
Chalisa Chamnarnwaree
Penphan Yothanan
Nomjit Tunsaw
Kloyjai Phetsaenkha
Juthamas Jantakan
Suwimon Sangtad
Chonticha Chirdpetcharat
Pattrawadee Janthabut
Thidaporn Maihom
Juthathip Mathuros
Naruemol Banmoo

Joan Grajales
Chovi Borja
Merenciana Arayi
Camille Sambile
Melissa Jacob
Bernadette Mercado
Angeli Gloriani
Cindy Resultay
Cassandra Tioseco
Analyn Almazan
Denise Tiu

Choo Sook Ping
Yong Shin Min
Ang Siew Teng
Yaakob Nur Izzati
Pang Hui Pin
Lee Siew Fun
Kew Suik May
Ting Eugene Chiau Teng
Goh Beng Fong
Hee Shook Ying
Yap Ching Yee

== See also ==
- Men's tournament
