= List of Break Free episodes =

Break Free (Chinese: 曙光) is a Malaysian television drama series. It stars Tay Ping Hui, Terence Cao, Zhang Zhen Huan, Andie Chen, Yvonne Lim and Kate Pang as the main characters in the story. The story revolves around four men from different backgrounds who were convicted to jail and their aftermaths when they were released.

It was broadcast on MediaCorp Channel 8 in Singapore from 18 March 2013 to 26 April 2013, and on ntv7 in Malaysia from 27 March 2013 to 16 May 2013. A total of 30 episodes were aired during this period.

== Episodes ==
No.	Title	Original release date
1	"Episode One"	March 18, 2013 PG Some Violence (Singapore); March 27, 2013 P13 (Malaysia)
2	"Episode Two"	March 19, 2013 PG (Singapore); March 28, 2013 P13 (Malaysia)
3	"Episode Three"	March 20, 2013 PG (Singapore); April 1, 2013 P13 (Malaysia)
4	"Episode Four"	March 21, 2013 PG (Singapore); April 2, 2013 P13 (Malaysia)
5	"Episode Five"	March 22, 2013 PG (Singapore); April 3, 2013 P13 (Malaysia)
6	"Episode Six"	March 25, 2013 PG (Singapore); April 4, 2013 P13 (Malaysia)
7	"Episode Seven"	March 26, 2013 PG (Singapore); April 8, 2013 P13 (Malaysia)
8	"Episode Eight"	March 27, 2013 PG (Singapore); April 9, 2013 P13 (Malaysia)
9	"Episode Nine"	March 28, 2013 PG (Singapore); April 10, 2013 P13 (Malaysia)
10	"Episode Ten"	March 29, 2013 PG (Singapore); April 11, 2013 P13 (Malaysia)
11	"Episode Eleven"	April 1, 2013 PG (Singapore); April 15, 2013 P13 (Malaysia)
12	"Episode Twelve"	April 2, 2013 PG (Singapore); April 16, 2013 P13 (Malaysia)
13	"Episode Thirteen"	April 3, 2013 PG Some Violence (Singapore); April 17, 2013 P13 (Malaysia)
14	"Episode Fourteen"	April 4, 2013 PG (Singapore); April 18, 2013 P13 (Malaysia)
15	"Episode Fifteen"	April 5, 2013 PG (Singapore); April 22, 2013 P13 (Malaysia)
16	"Episode Sixteen"	April 8, 2013 PG (Singapore); April 23, 2013 P13 (Malaysia)
17	"Episode Seventeen"	April 9, 2013 PG (Singapore); April 24, 2013 P13 (Malaysia)
18	"Episode Eighteen"	April 10, 2013 PG (Singapore); April 25, 2013 P13 (Malaysia)
19	"Episode Nineteen"	April 11, 2013 PG (Singapore); April 29, 2013 P13 (Malaysia)
20	"Episode Twenty"	April 12, 2013 PG (Singapore); April 30, 2013 P13 (Malaysia)
21	"Episode Twenty-one"	April 15, 2013 PG Some Sexual References (Singapore); May 1, 2013 P13 (Malaysia)
22	"Episode Twenty-two"	April 16, 2013 PG Some Violence (Singapore); May 2, 2013 P13 (Malaysia)
23	"Episode Twenty-three"	April 17, 2013 PG (Singapore); May 6, 2013 P13 (Malaysia)
24	"Episode Twenty-four"	April 18, 2013 PG Some Violence (Singapore); May 7, 2013 P13 (Malaysia)
25	"Episode Twenty-five"	April 19, 2013 PG (Singapore); May 8, 2013 P13 (Malaysia)
26	"Episode Twenty-six"	April 22, 2013 PG Some Violence (Singapore); May 9, 2013 P13 (Malaysia)
27	"Episode Twenty-seven"	April 23, 2013 PG (Singapore); May 13, 2013 P13 (Malaysia)
28	"Episode Twenty-eight"	April 24, 2013 PG Some Violence (Singapore); May 14, 2013 P13 (Malaysia)
29	"Episode Twenty-nine"	April 25, 2013 PG Some Violence (Singapore); May 15, 2013 P13 (Malaysia)
30	"Episode Thirty (Finale)"	April 26, 2013 PG Some Violence (Singapore); May 16, 2013 P13 (Malaysia)

== See also ==
- Break Free
- List of MediaCorp Channel 8 Chinese Drama Series (2010s)
