= Chase Tan =

Singaporean basketball player and actor (born 1990)

- Born: 1 April 1990 (age 36); Singapore
- Occupations: Basketball player; actor
- Years active: 2014–present
- Basketball career

No. 83 – SBPHK Hornets
- Position: Shooting guard
- League: National Basketball League

Personal information
- Born: Singapore
- Listed height: 6 ft 1 in (1.85 m)

Career information
- Playing career: 2010–present

Career history
- 2010–2015: Singapore Slingers
Medals
Men's basketball
Representing Singapore
Southeast Asian Games
| Bronze medal – third place | 2013 Naypyidaw | Team |
| Bronze medal – third place | 2015 Singapore | Team |
SEABA Cup
| Bronze medal – third place | 2016 Bangkok | Team |

Chinese name
- Traditional Chinese: 陳錦宏
- Simplified Chinese: 陈锦宏
- Hanyu Pinyin: Chén Jǐnhóng

Chase Tan Chin Hong (born 1 April 1990) is a Singaporean actor and basketball player who plays for the SBPHK Hornets in the Singapore National Basketball League and the Singapore national basketball team.

== Early life and education ==
Chase Tan was born on 1 April 1990. He studied in Princess Elizabeth Primary School and Jurongville Secondary School. He started playing basketball while studying in secondary school, and was selected for his school team. Tan graduated from SIM University.

== Career ==
=== Basketball career ===
When Tan was 19, he was spotted by Singapore's national coach Neo Beng Siang and was invited to be part of the Singapore Slingers. Tan played for the Singapore Slingers in the Asean Basketball League (ABL) from 2010 to 2015. As of 2019, he plays for the SBPHK Hornets in the National Basketball League.

Tan represented Singapore in major competitions such as the Southeast Asian Games. He took part in 2013, 2015 and 2019. He won bronze in the 2013 and 2015 edition.

=== Acting career ===
Tan was talent-spotted in 2013 when he emerged as one of the top 12 finalist for Hey Gorgeous (season 2). In 2014, Tan made his film debut in Meeting the Giant, directed by Tay Ping Hui. Tan made his Mediacorp acting debut in a drama series produced by Channel 8, Blessings.

== Controversy ==
Chase Tan was cast as one of the characters in My Guardian Angels, a 2020 Singaporean Chinese-language drama about three mothers struggling to raise their children alone. The fictional drama depicts Tan as Bai Shande, a paedophile basketball coach with sexually transmitted diseases who molested teenage boys. Bai was sentenced to jail and caning after his being arrested for his crimes.

The appearance of the character sparked controversy for its alleged discrimination against the LGBTQ community in Singapore, to which Mediacorp and also Tan himself made official apologies for the feature and assured the LGBTQ public that they had no intent to discriminate the LGBTQ in Singapore.

== Filmography ==
=== Television series ===
| Year | Title | Role | Ref |
|---|---|---|---|
| 2014 | Blessings | Hai | |
| 2015 | You Can Be an Angel Too | Ace | |
| 2016 | You Can Be an Angel 2 | Ace | |
| 2017 | Have A Little Faith | | |
| 2017 | The Lead | Assistant producer Chase | |
| 2018 | A Million Dollar Dream | Shawn | |
| 2019 | Old Is Gold (老友万岁) | Peter Goh | |
| 2019 | Hello Miss Driver (下一站，遇见) | Di Sheng | |
| 2019 | Heart To Heart (心点心) | Joe | |
| 2020 | My Guardian Angels (单翼天使) | Mr Peh Shande | |
| 2020 | Super Dad (男神不败) | Tan Zhenting | |
| 2020 | A Jungle Survivor (森林生存记) | Adam | |
| 2021 | The Heartland Hero | Xiaoshuai | |
| 2022 | You Can Be an Angel 4 | Albert | |

=== Film ===
| Year | Title | Role | Ref |
|---|---|---|---|
| 2014 | Meeting the Giant | Rongqiang | |

== Awards and accolades ==
Legend : Gold Silver Bronze QR: Qualifying Round

| Event | Results | Date | Competition |
|---|---|---|---|
| Men's Tournament | | 15 June 2015 | 2015 Southeast Asian Games |
| SEABA Cup | | 22 May 2014 | 2014 SEABA Cup |
| Men's Tournament | | 8 December 2013 | 2013 Southeast Asian Games |
| Top 20 Finalist | 12th | 15 July 2013 | Hey Gorgeous Season 2 |
