= Pinay Ballers League =

Filipino women's basketball league

Pinay Ballers League (PBL)
- Sport: Basketball
- Founded: August 2014
- First season: 2014
- Folded: 2022
- President: Ewon Arayi
- Commissioner: Manny Ignacio
- No. of teams: 7 teams (2022 Elite)
- Country: Philippines
- Continent: Asia
- Last champion: Philippine Army - Altama (2022 Elite)

Pinay Ballers League (PBL) is a women's basketball league based in the Philippines. It was formed in 2014 by Ewon's Sports Association, Inc., a group of local women's basketball stakeholders, They were led by former Adamson Falcons player Merenciana "Ewon" Arayi, captain of the Philippines women's national basketball team in the 2015 Southeast Asian Games. The PBL aims to give women basketball players, who have played on the national team or in collegiate leagues, a chance to play after college and start a semi-professional career.

== History ==
The PiBaLeague was part of an attempt to form a professional women's basketball league in the Philippines, following the defunct WPBL, the counterpart of the men's league, the Philippine Basketball League.

The league had two divisions, the Elite Division for players who have finished their collegiate careers, and the Developmental Division for players who work for BPOs. The PiBALeague also conducted clinics and outreach programs in the provinces for girls who seek a basketball career. The Philippine Sports Commission supported the League through the Women-in-Sports program.

The funding and operational costs of the league (including officiating, venues, and security) come from the entrance fee of the league's teams and from the league's sponsors, which are small and medium-sized companies.
