= Timor-Leste men's national basketball team =

Basketball team representing Timor-Leste

Timor-Leste
- FIBA ranking: NR (1 September 2026)
- Joined FIBA: 2013
- FIBA zone: FIBA Oceania
- National federation: National Basketball Federation of Timor-Leste
- Coach: Leandro Dos Santos

FIBA World Cup
- Appearances: None

FIBA Oceania Championship
- Appearances: None

FIBA Oceania Youth Tournament
- Appearances: None
Home	Away

The Timor-Leste national basketball team represents Timor-Leste in international basketball competitions and is managed by the National Basketball Federation of Timor-Leste abbreviated as FNBTL (Portuguese: Nacional de Basquetebol de Timor-Leste).

== History ==
Prior to the team's national federation admission to FIBA in 2013, the national team participated at the 2006 Lusophony Games. The team lost its five games against Angola, Cape Verde, Guinea-Bissau, and Portugal with an average score of 166–39. East Timor did not score more than 39 points against all opposition except against Portugal, whom they scored 69 points against.

Timor-Leste's first tournament as part of FIBA was the 2015 Southeast Asian Games facing Indonesia, Malaysia and the Philippines in the group stage.

Timor-Leste was initially assigned to FIBA Asia; on 2015, it was reassigned to FIBA Oceania "to facilitate the development of the game in the country and the participation of its athletes in international competitions."

== Results ==
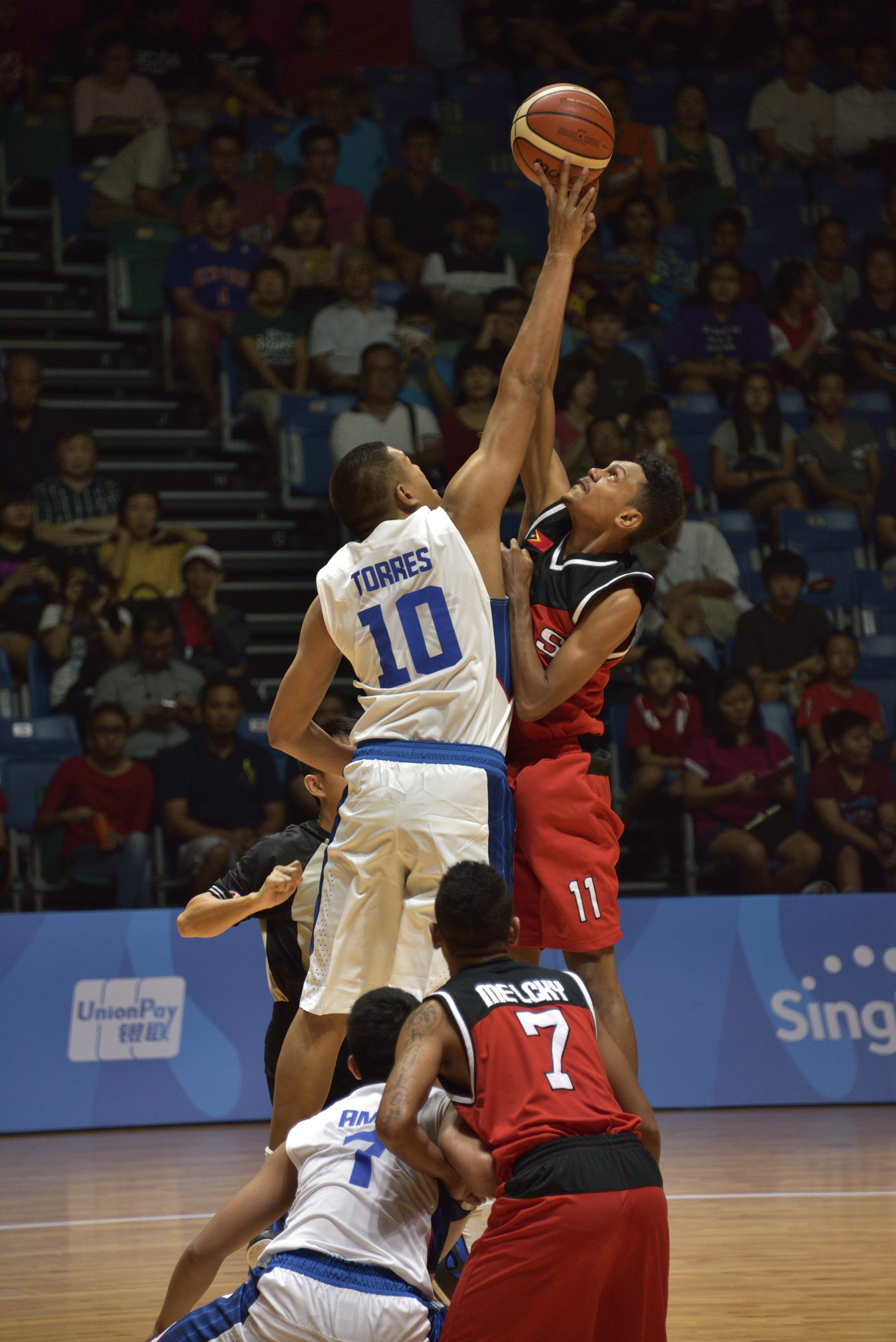
Filipino player, Norbert Torres (left) against Paulo das Dores (right) on tip off; June 12, 2015 at the 2015 Southeast Asian Games

=== Summer Olympics ===
yet to qualify

=== FIBA World Cup ===
yet to qualify

=== FIBA Oceania Championship ===
never participated

=== Oceania Basketball Tournament ===
never participated

=== Lusophony Games ===
- 2006 – 6th place
- 2009–2014 – Did not participate

=== Southeast Asian Games ===
- 2015 – 9th

== Current roster ==
At the 2015 Southeast Asian Games: (incomplete)

Timor-Leste men's national basketball team roster
Players
Coaches

Pos.	No.	Name	Age – Date of birth	Height	Club	Ctr.
		Melchior Pereira	–
		Ivo Miranda	–
		Baptista da Silva Ribeiro	–
		R. P. João Soares	–
		Roberto da Costa Martins	–
		Paulo das Dores	–
		Ke'esh Obadiah Mitchell	–

Head coach

Assistant coaches

Legend

- Club – describes last
  club before the tournament
- Age – describes age
  on 9 June 2015

== Coaches ==
- (Portugal) Leandro Dos Santos (2015– )
