= The Lead =

Singaporean TV series

- 第一主角
- Genre: Drama; Media Industry; Romance; Period
- Written by: Phang Kai Yee 彭凯毅; Lim Gim Lan 林锦兰
- Directed by: Loo Yin Yam 卢燕金; Oh Liang Cai 胡凉财; Lin Mei Na 林美娜; Wong Foong Hwee 黄芬菲
- Starring: Rebecca Lim; Shaun Chen; Andie Chen; Julie Tan
- Opening theme: 初衷 by Tay Ping Hui
- Ending theme: 1) 谈到爱 by Ling Kai; 2) 记得 by JJ Lin; 3) 亲密爱人 by 王芳
- Country of origin: Singapore
- Original language: Mandarin
- No. of episodes: 30

Production
- Executive producer: Winnie Wong 王尤红
- Production locations: Singapore; Indonesia
- Running time: approx. 45 minutes (excluding advertisements)

Original release
- Network: Mediacorp Channel 8
- Release: 22 May – 30 June 2017

The Lead (Chinese: 第一主角) is a 30-episode Singaporean drama produced and telecast on Mediacorp Channel 8. The show is Channel 8's mid-year blockbuster for 2017 to remember Mediacorp at Caldecott Hill and to celebrate 35 years of television dramas. It stars Rebecca Lim, Shaun Chen, Andie Chen and Julie Tan as main cast.

== Plot ==
Ah Zhen (Rebecca Lim) has three childhood friends, Guang Hui (Shaun Chen), De Ping (Andie Chen) and An Ya (Julie Tan). Like Ah Zhen, they also love watching drama, and yearned to be seen on the TV screen. The four friends even made a pact together: To make it big in the drama scene, to play the lead character in a drama someday!

After graduating from secondary school, the four friends joined the TV station's acting classes, and all of them, except Ah Zhen, were selected to join the TV station as actors. Even though she was disappointed, Ah Zhen refused to give up, and began a journey full of hardships in the local drama scene.

Initially Ah Zhen worked alongside her father Xiao Hu (Chen Hanwei), who was a martial art stuntman. Unfortunately she was clumsy and always got injured, so she had to switch to being an extra. But even as an extra, she always somehow got in the way and was disliked and shunned by the production team. But Ah Zhen refused to leave the TV station, and found herself a job in the Costume department.

Childhood friend Guang Hui clinched his first lead role, and An Ya and De Ping had also taken up supporting roles, yet Ah Zhen was still struggling to survive. She switched from department to department: make-up, Props, Radio... trying to find a path for herself, but it seems like she was drifting further from her original dream of becoming an actress. Luckily at that time, she met her savior, the then “Ah-jie” of local drama scene, Chen Xiang Rong (Xiang Yun), a woman whom Ah Zhen saw as her own mother. Under the help of Xiang Rong, Ah Zhen managed to get a small supporting role in her first ever drama debut.

Since then, Ah Zhen began her career as a freelance actor, taking part in a number of classic productions. But Ah Zhen was insistent in her own method of acting, which many others could not agree to. By then, Guang Hui was already a popular rising star, and An Ya was radiant and eye catching after her cosmetic procedure, so the two co-starred in a few dramas, and they became the best on screen couple of their time. Ah Zhen was happy for her friends’ achievements, but she couldn't help but feel a little heartbroken. Actually, Ah Zhen has always been fond of Guang Hui since her teenage years, but Guang Hui never really noticed her.

At the lowest point in Ah Zhen's life, and she felt like she was abandoned by the entire world. But with encouragement from her friends, she eventually got up on her feet again. This time, Ah Zhen decided to focus on her job behind the scenes instead!

Working as the assistant producer was the turning point of Ah Zhen's life. As she had worked in various departments previously, she had contacts everywhere in the production team, making life as an AP easier. She took part in various popular dramas, and with a brush of luck, she always managed to accidentally create epic scenes in the dramas. Eventually, she worked her way up to a director.

As the years go by, many things were no longer what they used to be. The TV station separated into two competing stations, and the friendship between the four broke down. Guang Hui was leading a wasted life, gambling and drinking away, and losing money in unsuccessful investments, eventually leading to a broken family. After separating from Guang Hui, An Ya took to the international screen, but was faced with aftereffects of excessive cosmetic surgery, threatening her acting career. De Ping was involved in a sex scandal and was fired by the TV station, and even ended up in jail for 2 months.

Seeing that their friendship was severely challenged, Ah Zhen, the only one who has not changed, tried very hard to bring the other three back together. After all these ups and downs, will the perseverance of Ah Zhen eventually recover the lost friendship between them?

Ah Zhen has always been secretly loving Guang Hui, but she always misses the opportunity to bring their friendship to another level. How will their relationship end up? An Ya and Guang Hui were the promising couple, but love grew into hate, and they went separate ways, though they never truly forgotten each other. Will they ever reconcile? Ah Zhen and De Ping are friends in times of need, supporting each other faithfully through all these times. Will their relationship eventually bear fruit?

Will this complicated four-sided relationship finally come to a happy ending?

== Cast ==
=== Main cast ===
- Rebecca Lim as Lin Meizhen 林美真
  - Isabel Yamada as a younger Lim
- Shaun Chen as Xie Guanghui 谢光辉, an actor
  - Damien Teo as a younger Xie
- Andie Chen as Hong Deping 洪德平, an actor and taxi driver
  - Ivan Lo as a younger Hong
- Julie Tan as Fang Anya 方安雅, an actress
  - Toh Xin Hui as a younger Fang

=== Supporting cast ===
Cast	Character	Description	Episode Appeared
Xiang Yun	Chen Xiangrong 陈湘蓉	Liu Xinyu's best friend; Lin Xiaohu's girlfriend; TV station's actress	1–10, 17–25, 30
Chen Hanwei 陈汉玮	Lin Xiaohu 林小虎	Liu Xinyu's husband; Lin Meizhen's father; Chen Xiangrong's boyfriend; TV station's stuntman, calefare and substitute	1–6, 9-25, 30
Terence Cao 曹国辉	Guo Liwei 郭立威	Main Villain: TV station's actor; Pretends to like Lin Meizhen to make use of her; Befriends Xie Guanghui to exploit him of his money; Likes Huang Mei Na and secretly has an affair with her	10-22
Jasmine Sim 沈家玉	Huang Mei Na 黄美娜	Supporting Villain; Na Na (娜娜): TV station's Ah Jie/actress; Likes Guo Liwei and secretly has an affair with him; Pretends to like Xie Guanghui to exploit him of money; Xie Guanghui's Ex-Wife	14–16, 18-22
Cynthia Koh 许美珍	Chen Qiulian 陈秋莲	TV station's director ~> Head of Drama producer and director; Resigned from TV Station	16, 18–20, 22–23, 25, 27-28
Kym Ng 钟琴	Liu Xinyu 刘心雨	Lin Xiaohu's wife; Chen Xiangrong's best friend; Lin Meizhen and Deng Yongkang's mother	19-25
Zheng Geping 郑各评	Fang Guodong 方国栋	Uncle Curly Hair (卷毛叔): TV station canteen boss; Zhao Meili's husband; Fang Anya's father	1–2, 4, 6–7, 9–10, 12–15, 17–21, 26-30
Cassendra See 薛淑珊	Zhao Meili 赵美丽	Auntie Fang (方姨): TV station canteen lady boss; Fang Guodong's wife; Fang Anya's mother	1, 7, 10, 13–15, 17, 19, 21, 26-30
Jin Yinji 金银姬	Fang Yahua 方亚华	Guanghui's Grandmother (光辉的阿嬷): Xie Guanghui's paternal grandmother; Lin Bixia's mother-in-law; Died from stroke; (Deceased ~ Episode 26)	1-6, 8–12, 14–15, 18, 21–23, 25-26; 26-27, 30 (flashback)
He Yingying 何盈莹	Jing Jing 晶晶	Villain but repented: TV station's actress/ future Ah Jie; Disliked and envied by Fang Anya	19–23, 29-30
Michael Huang 黄仲昆	Ma Xinghai 马兴海	TV Station's Head of Drama producer and director; Retired from the TV Station in Episode 18	1–8, 12, 15-18

=== TV Station's Celebrities/ Extras ===
Cast	Character	Description	Episode Appeared
Elizabeth Lee 李巧儿	Xue Bing 雪冰	TV station's actress	7-9
Li Wenhai 李文海	Zheng Jiang 郑将	Hong Kong actor	16-17
Alvin Tho 卓汉隆		TV Station's actor	
		TV Station's freelance actress; Been raped by Hong Deping that was set up by Guo Liwei	17
Eugene Tay 郑建龙		TV Station's freelance actor	5,16
Fang Rong 符芳榕	Yao Yao 瑶瑶	TV station's actress	19-20

=== TV Station's Heads ===
Cast	Character	Description	Episode Appeared
Marcus Mok 莫健发	Adam	TV Station's Overall In-Charge	17–18, 25
Wang Yuqing 王昱清		TV Station's Head of drama script/ story writer	1, 28
Michelle Tay 郑荔分		TV Station's Head of Wardrobe	8-10
Wallace Ang 洪圣安	Qiang-Ge 强哥	TV Station's make up department in-charge	10–11, 16, 18
Uncredited		TV Station's stylist; Hong Deping's passenger	28
Uncredited	Mr Soh	Head of TV's Station departments	28

=== TV Station's Instructors Directors/ Reporters/ Producers ===
Cast	Character	Description	Episode Appeared
Rebecca Lim 林慧玲	Lin Meizhen 林美真	See Main Cast	
Guo Liang 郭亮	Li Wei 李伟	TV station's acting class instructor	1-2
Louis Wu 伍洛毅	Ken	TV Station's director	4-5
Ryan Lian 廖永谊	No Role	TV Station's director	7
Tay Ping Hui 郑斌辉	Himself	Star Awards' emcee	13-14
Chase Tan 陈锦宏	Chase	TV Station's assistant director; Lin Meizhen's assistant	18–19, 21-24
Kenneth Chung 钟坤华	No Role	TV station's director	19
CKay Lim 林志强	Xu Zhiguang 许志光	TV Station's Executive Producer; Been resigned from TV Station	19–22, 27-28
Bukoh Mary 巫许玛莉	Mary	TV Station's reporter	27
Fraser Tiong 张家奇	No Role	TV Station's director	

=== Others ===
Cast	Character	Description	Episode Appeared
Zhu Xiufeng 朱秀凤	Sister E 鹅姐	Chen Xiangrong's friend	3-4
Jaslyn Theen 汤妙玲	Lin Bixia 林碧霞	Villain: Gambler; Xie Guanghui's mother; Fang Yahua's daughter-in-law; Used to be Lin Xiaohu's love interest; Steals away Xie Guanghui valuables but was caught by Lin Xiaohu	10-16
Hu Wensui 胡问遂		Villain: Loanshark; Lin Bixia's subordinate	12-15
Benjamin Tan 陈俊铭	Eric Hong	Villain: Boss of Hollywood Movie Company; Cheated Fang Anya all this while because he is unhappy to know that she only have feelings for Xie Guanghui	12–13, 22, 26-28
Charlie Goh 吴清樑	Jack	Villain: Loanshark	20-26
Dylan Quek 郭景豪	Jay	Villain: Loanshark	20-26
Teo Sili 张思丽	Auntie Hong 洪婶	Hong Deping's aunt	22, 27
Hoong Kuo Juey 洪国锐	Uncle Hong 洪叔	Hong Deping's uncle	22, 27
Larry Low 刘龙伟	Xiao Ma 小马	Film/movie film crew	23
Nick Teo	Deng Yongkang 邓永康	Liu Xinyu's son; Lin Meizhen's half younger brother	25
Uncredited	Mr Li 李先生	Been knocked by Hong Deping's car and hospitalized	26-28
Uncredited	No Role	Helped Xie Guanghui at a shore and escort him find a place to stay in Tanjungpinang (Indonesia)	27-28
Alston Yeo 杨峻毅	No Role	Helped Xie Guanghui at a shore and escort him find a place to stay in Tanjungpinang (Indonesia)	27

== Original Sound Track (OST) ==
No.	Song title	Singer(s)
1)	初衷 (Main Song for the series)	Tay Ping Hui
2)	谈到爱	Ling Kai
3)	记得	JJ Lin 林俊杰
4)	亲密爱人	王芳

== Accolades ==
Organisation	Year	Category	Nominee(s)	Result	Ref.
Star Awards	2018	Best Director	Loo Yin Yam	Nominated	
Star Awards	2018	Best Theme Song	"初衷" by Tay Ping Hui	Nominated	
Star Awards	2018	Young Talent Award	Damien Teo	Nominated	
Star Awards	2018	Young Talent Award	Isabel Yamada	Won	
Star Awards	2018	Best Supporting Actor	Chen Hanwei	Won	
Star Awards	2018	Best Actress	Rebecca Lim	Won	

== Development ==
- Filming began in November 2016 and wraps in March 2017

== See also ==
- List of MediaCorp Channel 8 Chinese drama series (2010s)
