= Break Free (TV series) =

- 曙光
- Story by: Koh Teng Liang 许声亮; Ding Yun 丁云
- Starring: Tay Ping Hui; Terence Cao; Zhang Zhen Huan; Andie Chen; Yvonne Lim; Kate Pang
- Opening theme: 想飞 by Kelvin Tan
- Countries of origin: Malaysia; Singapore
- Original language: Mandarin
- No. of episodes: 30

Production
- Producer: Joe Ma 马家骏

Original release
- Network: Mediacorp Channel 8 (Singapore)
- Release: 18 March – 26 April 2013

Break Free (Chinese: 曙光) is a television series and the eighth Malaysian production by MediaCorp Studios Malaysia. The series is about four men (Tay Ping Hui, Terence Cao, Zhang Zhen Huan, Andie Chen) from different backgrounds who were convicted to jail and their aftermaths when they were released.

Filming began in July 2012 and took place in Kuala Lumpur, Malaysia. The drama was announced to premiere in November 2012, however, it was delayed to March 2013 instead. It made its debut in Singapore on 18 March 2013. It airs on Malaysia on 27 March 2013. It broadcasts on Sunday at 12pm.

== Synopsis ==
Four men leave prison, each facing an uncertain future. The first one, Li Tianming, is a hot headed and emotional man who owns a moving company. He originally led a happy and contented life, not knowing that his wife, Huang Hai Tang, was having an affair with her qigong master, Wang Xiao Tian. His younger sister, Li Chun Li, ganged up with her husband, Xiong Zhenghui, to cheat their mother of her life savings. Thus the siblings became bitter enemies. Once, in a fight, Tianming chopped Zheng Hui’s hand, and was sentenced to jail. Just before he was released, he received news that his mother had died, and that his wife was asking for a divorce. Tianming had suddenly lost everything, including his house, son and daughter, to Wang Xiao Tian.

At this point in time, Tian Shi Shi, a social worker, got to know the four prisoners. She was kind hearted and helpful, but ended up embroiled in the lives and relationships of the four men.

Jin Yongcheng used to be an alcoholic gambler, who hit his wife. Thus, his wife took his daughter, Jin Hui Chen, and attempted suicide. Luckily Jin Yong Cheng arrived in time to rescue his daughter, but was too late to save his wife. As he was guilt ridden and drank even more, he killed Ye Zhi Bin’s cousin while drink-driving and was sentenced to prison. With her mother dead and father in prison, Jin Hui Chen became rebellious with a hatred for her father. Her father was in no position to discipline her, and she had a reputation for being a wild and problematic child.

Ye Zhi Bin was the chief financial officer of a finance company owned by his uncle. He was timid, hardworking and lacked ambition. However, he had a greedy wife, Wang Zi Yu, who was very materialistic. As Zhibin had to satisfy her demands, he embezzled from his company and was sentenced to 5 years in prison.

Xu Hao Long came from a wealthy family, but his parents had divorced and lived abroad. His grandfather had raised him up, and he had been thrown into jail for violence. Just before he was sentenced, he had a girlfriend, Liu Shu Yuan, with whom he wanted to marry. However, they broke off after that. Haolong is also a HIV positive patient, who was infected after a prostitute with AIDS pricked him with a contaminated needle after a quarrel, when he was working as a nurse. He hit her back in anger and was thus sentenced to prison. In prison, he worked hard to accumulate legal knowledge and improve himself.

Upon release, Tianming brought Yongcheng into his moving company. He also started his divorce proceedings with his wife. With Shishi’s help, he managed to convince the judge into letting him have custody of both his son and daughter, and won the court case for the return of his money that his wife had taken from him. However, his wife fled overseas with his children and money. Initially he had promised to invest the money recovered from his wife into Ye Zhi Bin’s company, but could not keep his word as his wife fled. Thus Wang Zi Yu wanted to sue him. Over this issue, Ye Zhi Bin and his wife quarrelled bitterly, and Wang Zi Yu kept nagging him, forbidding him from having any further contact with the other three men.

Later, Haolong got to know a shampoo girl named Ni Qing Qing at the hair salon. He thought she was arrogant with a bad attitude, and had a bad impression of her. However, later when he got to know her better, he realised that she was a good person, and learnt that she was Ye Zhi Bin’s cousin. Although she seemed very arrogant and hard to get along with, she was actually trying to protect herself after years of being sexually abused by relatives because she had been an orphan. She could not trust any man after her ordeal. As Xu Hao Long helped Ni Qing Qing, they started to develop feelings for each other. However Xu Hao Long’s medical condition suddenly deteriorated, so he began to get cold feet about dating again.

Zhi Bin and Wang Zi Yu’s marriage was on the rocks with their constant bickering, so Ziyu stopped respecting him and insisted on a divorce. As Haolong felt that Zhibin was a reliable man, he decided to match make him with Qingqing instead.

Meanwhile, Huichen kept causing trouble, such that Yongcheng neglected his job and his health. Coincidentally, the young man that he had killed while drink-driving was Qingqing's brother. With Hao Long’s counselling, Qing Qing was finally able to forgive Yong Cheng, and move on in her life.

To help Jin Yong Cheng, Li Tian Ming let Jin Hui Chen work in his company. Jin Hui Chen was grateful for the opportunity, and worked hard to change her attitude, thus her relationship with her father started improving as well. However, her ex-boyfriend’s henchmen still kept creating trouble for her. As Tianming saved her many times, she developed a crush on him. Yongcheng objected, and they fell out with each other again. Huichen was devastated to be rejected by Li Tian Ming, and became depressed. Thus, Jin Yong Cheng was worried sick over his daughter. As Tian Shi Shi also showed care for Jin Yong Cheng, Li Tian Ming misunderstood that she had fallen for him.

With his son’s encouragement, Li Tian Ming finally mustered up the courage to make his feelings known to Tian Shi Shi, who seemed like perfect angel. However, she confessed her own past to him, and told him her reasons for not wanting to be in a relationship again. She used to be in a stable relationship with a man named Yu Hao Song. However, he had a stalker named Li Li who was crazy about him. Once, Li Li and Shi Shi got into a fight, and Li Li fell down a flight of steps, becoming crippled. As Tian Shi Shi was guilt ridden, she left Yu Hao Song, and buried herself in work to forget her troubles and to avoid being embroiled in relationships.

When Ye Zhi Bin knew that his wife had a miscarriage, he left to work in a plant nursery. However, just then Wang Zi Yu’s business venture failed, and thus she wanted to be back by his side. Thinking that she had repented, he returned, but she became worse, dabbling in illegal activities. When she was found out, she fled, putting the blame on her husband. As a result, Ye Zhi Bin became mentally disturbed.

When she realized that her willfulness had caused her father to be hospitalized, Jin Hui Chen finally turned over a new leaf. In the hospital, Li Tian Ming saw an injured Huang Hai Tang, who had broken off with Wang Xiao Tian. Then, his son, Li Zhong Wei, felt that something was amiss with his sister, and was told by Tian Shi Shi that his sister had drowned in Hong Kong. Li Tian Wei was filled with grief.

When Li Tian Ming tried to ask Huang Hai Tang why his daughter had drowned, she would not tell him and threatened suicide. Thus, Tian Shi Shi took up qigong to draw near to Wang Xiao Tian, in a bid to find out the truth, but Li Tian Ming misunderstood her again. She found out that Wang Xiao Tian had abandoned Huang Hai Tang because he found a rich woman named Cen Hai Ling. Moreover, Huang Hai Tang had developed cancer. Shishi hears that Wang Xiao Tian had caused Li Mei Mei’s death by abandoning her in a pool, while having a tryst with Hai Ling. When Tianming found out the truth, he swore vengeance.

After discussing the matter with Jin Yong Cheng, they decided to confront Wang Xiao Tian. As Jin Yong Cheng felt that Li Tian Ming still had a bright future, he secretly went to confront Wang Xiao Tian himself. He stabbed Wang Xiao Tian’s back, and went to turn himself in to the police. After Tian Shi Shi arrived to the scene of the crime, she quickly went with Xu Hao Long to report the matter to the police. However, after the police investigated, they found that he was drowned, and made Tian Shi Shi a suspect, because of her footprints, which were left behind at the crime scene.

Later the police found another set of DNA on the deceased and freed Shishi. Then, Huang Hai Tang turned herself in and admitted that she had drowned Wang Xiao Tian after finding him maimed on that fateful day. In the end, Li Tian Ming forgave Huang Hai Tang as she had gotten her just deserts. Jin Yongcheng was sentenced to prison again, and Wang Zi Yu was caught and tried. As the four of them looked at the dawning sun, they knew that despite all that had happened in one’s life, with hope, one would always have the courage to face their daily trials.

== Cast and characters ==
- Tay Ping Hui as Li Tian Ming (黎天明):
  A hot headed and emotional man who owned a moving company.
- Terence Cao as Jin Yong Cheng (金勇诚):
  A former alcoholic gambler who abuses his wife
- Zhang Zhen Huan as Ye Zhi Bin (叶志斌):
  A timid, hardworking person who is the chief financial officer of a finance company but lacked ambition.
- Andie Chen as Xu Hao Long (徐浩龙):
  A former nurse who is HIV-infected.
- Yvonne Lim as Tian Shi Shi (田诗诗):
  A social worker who befriended the 4 former convicts.
- Kate Pang as Ni Qing Qing (倪青青):
  Zhi Bin's cousin
- Felina Cheah as Huang Hai Tang (黄海棠):
  Tian Ming's former wife.
- Chen Hao Yan as Li Zhongwei (黎仲维):
  Tian Ming's son.
- Akit Tay as Wang Ziyu (王紫瑜):
  Zhi Bin's wife.
- Wu Jiale as Jin Huichen (金慧辰):
  Yongcheng's daughter.
- Nick Chung as Yu Haosong (俞浩松):
  Shi Shi's former boyfriend.
- Steve Yap as Wang Xiao Tian (王孝添):
  Hai Tang's former lover.

== Reception ==
The series is one of three drama serials to tie-in for 3rd-highest-rated drama serial in 2013 (with It's a Wonderful Life and The Journey: A Voyage), behind C.L.I.F. 2 (with 901,000) and later The Dream Makers (with 885,000). It is also, so far, the highest-rated series for MediaCorp Studios Malaysia, with an average viewership of 835,000.

== Awards and nominations ==
The Star Awards are presented by Mediacorp.

Star Awards – Acting Awards
Nominees	Accolades	Category	Result
Zhang Zhen Huan 张振寰	Star Awards 2014 Show 2	Best Supporting Actor 最佳男配角	Nominated

== See also ==
- List of programmes broadcast by Mediacorp Channel 8
- List of Break Free episodes
