= Meeting the Giant =

2014 Singaporean-Chinese film

- Chinese theatrical release poster
- Traditional Chinese: 再見巨人
- Simplified Chinese: 再见巨人
- Hanyu Pinyin: Zàijiàn jùrén
- Directed by: Tay Ping Hui
- Screenplay by: Tay Ping Hui; Zhu Houren; Danny Yeo
- Produced by: Zhu Houren; Lim Teck
- Starring: Delvin Goh; Chua Seng Jin; Michael Lee; Lim Shengyu; Ian Fang; Ng Han Bin
- Cinematography: Chiu Wai Yin
- Edited by: Yim Mun Chong; Neo Rui Xin
- Music by: Zheng Kai Hua; Matthew Teng
- Production companies: G & J Creation; Clover Films; Stellar Mega Films
- Distributed by: Clover Films
- Release date: 19 June 2014 (Singapore)
- Running time: 104 minutes
- Countries: Singapore; China
- Language: Mandarin

Meeting the Giant (Chinese: 再见巨人) is a 2014 Singaporean-Chinese coming-of-age sports drama film directed by Tay Ping Hui in his directorial debut. Co-producing the film, Zhu Houren also serves as an executive producer and co-writer whilst making a special appearance in the film. The film features real-life professional basketball players and began filming in early August 2013. It was released in theatres on 19 June 2014.

== Plot ==
The film follows a young teenager's encounter with a group of young Chinese basketball talents who are brought to Singapore and groomed to play to win. After his initial resentment, the teen begins to look beyond the players' nationality and understand their personal struggles as well as the sacrifices their families had to make to give them a chance at a better life. As the young players gradually integrate and adapt to the local culture, the teen forms a friendship with them.

== Cast ==
=== Main and supporting ===
- Delvin Goh as Chen Hang
- Chua Seng Jin as Wu Junhui
- Michael Lee as Wang Shaohua
- Lim Shengyu as He Dadi
- Ian Fang as He Xiaodi
- Ng Han Bin as Gao Ming
- Zhuyan Manzi as Zhang Fang
- Gu Shiqi as Grandpa Chen
- Alvin Chiam as Li Qiang
- Wang Yan Bing as Xiong
- Patrick Tan as Gao Ming's father
- Tan Pai Pai as Gao Ming's mother
- Pan Ning as Chen Hang's mother
- Ron Teh as Zhilong
- Chase Tan as Rongqiang
- Aeson Rao as Li Jie
- Rayner Lim as Wang Mao
- Zhai Siming as Jiangyi
- Lim Weiren as Jiaqiang
- Wesley Wong as Weiwen

=== Special appearances ===
- Zhu Houren as Mr. Long
- Wang Shuo as Coach Zhang Jiang
- Jason Oh as Wu Yongde
- Bernard Tan as Coach Hong
- Na Guangzi as Bai Na
- H K Choo as Principal
- Huang Jiaqiang as Jiaqiang's father
- Sia Chuan as Junhui's grandpa
- Tay Ping Hui as Eagles player

== Reception ==
Hon Jing Yi of Today felt that Tay had a "pretty steady hand for a first-time director" and the story told "in a fairly clumsy manner" and "lacks focus, and becomes trite and superficial.".
