= National Basketball League (Singapore) =

Basketball league in Singapore

- Current season, competition or edition: 2026
- Sport: Basketball
- Founded: 2011
- Founder: Basketball Association of Singapore (BAS)
- First season: 2011
- Subdivision: National Basketball Developmental League
- No. of teams: 10
- Countries: Singapore
- Continent: FIBA Asia
- Most recent champions: Influence Magic K-Star/IMG Kstar (1st title)
- Most titles: SBPHK Hornets/Engtat Hornets/Allinton Eng Tat Hornets (4 titles)
- Broadcaster: BAS TV (YouTube)
- International cup: Basketball Champions League Asia
- Website: http://bas.org.sg/

The National Basketball League (BAS NBL), formerly known as BAS Cup which took on an extended league format in the 1980s, is the main tournament series organised annually by the Basketball Association of Singapore (BAS). This refers to the men's league which includes a system of promotion and relegation, and currently has 3 divisions. Newly-formed clubs that field teams must start in the lowest division.

The Women's National Basketball League (known as WNBL), follows a similar format but currently has only two divisions. All matches are played at the Singapore Basketball Centre in Aljunied.

The top-tier league, known as NBL Division 1 (previously known as BAS 'A' Division), currently consists of ten teams. The champions of each season are eligible to play in the qualifying rounds of the Basketball Champions League Asia, while the bottom teams are relegated to Division 2, with the top 2 Division 2 teams being promoted to Division 1. The Division 2 tournament is currently limited to 12 teams, while Division 3 serves as a qualifying tournament, saw over 30 teams compete for promotion to Division 2 in the 2025 edition of the tournament.

Between 2011 to 2025, Eng Tat Hornets won the most Division 1 titles (total of four), while Siglap Basketball and Adroit tie for second with three titles won each.

== Division 1 teams (2026 season) ==
- Influence Magic K-Star
- Allinton Eng Tat Hornets
- SG Basketball
- Siglap Basketball Club
- Tagawa
- Tong Whye
- Chong Ghee
- SBA
- Tung San
- Xin Hua Sports Club

== Division 1 teams (2025 season) ==
- Adroit
- Allinton Eng Tat Hornets
- SG Basketball
- Siglap Basketball Club
- Tagawa
- Tong Whye
- Chong Ghee
- SBA
- Tung San
- Xin Hua Sports Club

== Results ==
Year	NBL Division I		
Year	Champions	Runners-up	Third place
2011	Siglap (1)	SAFSA	Eng Tat Hornets
2012	Min Yi (1)	SAFSA	Siglap
2013	Siglap (1)	Adroit	SAFSA
2014	Adroit (1)	SBPHK Hornets	Home United
2015	SBPHK Hornets (1)	Adroit	Home United
2016	SBPHK Hornets (2)	Adroit	Siglap
2017	Xin Hua (1)	SAFSA	SBPHK Hornets
2018	SAFSA (1)	Adroit	SBPHK Hornets
2019	Siglap (3)	Xin Hua Sports Club	Adroit
2022	Engtat Hornets (3)	Adroit	Siglap
2023	Adroit (2)	Engtat Hornets	Tong Whye
2024	Adroit (3)	Engtat Hornets	Tagawa
2025	Allinton Eng Tat Hornets (4)	Siglap	SG Basketball
2026	IMG Kstar (1)	Allinton Eng Tat Hornets	Siglap

== Prize money ==
As of the 2025–26 season.

- Champion: $4,000
- Runner-up: $2,000
- Third place: $1,000

== Incident ==
In August 2025, Corrupt Practices Investigation Bureau arrested nine people for suspected involvement in fixing matches in the league. Players were among those arrested. The match between Tagawa and Tong Whye held on 1 August was among several matches that were allegedly fixed.

== See also ==
- Asean Basketball League (ABL)
- Pro-Am Singapore Basketball League (Pro-Am SBL)
