= Jurongville Secondary School =

Secondary school in Singapore

Coordinates: 1.35162°N 103.72911°E

Jurongville Secondary School (JVSS) (Chinese: 丰嘉中学) located at Jurong East Avenue 1 was established on 15 December 1993.

The pioneer group of 9 teachers, with the addition of 15 more teachers later in the year, formed the nucleus of the new school. The first Principal was Sun Huey Min, who was also the incumbent Principal of Commonwealth Secondary School (CSS) at that time. She served as the school's principal from December 1993 to December 1995.

In January 1994, JVSS, housed within Commonwealth Secondary itself, opened its doors to 507 Secondary One pupils, spread over 14 classes - 6 Express, 5 Normal Academic and 3 Normal Technical. In December 1995, Mohd Khairunan took over as the next Principal. However, it bid farewell to CSS which was to be relocated to new premises. JVSS was to remain on the same site and officially take over the location as their home. In July 1997, the school was officially opened. The Guest of Honour was Kenneth Chen Koon Lap, Member of Parliament for Hong Kah Group Representation Constituency. Later on, a new extension block was built. This was officially opened by Ms Ho Peng, Deputy Director Schools 2, Ministry of Education, on 17 April 1999.

In December 2000, Khairunan left the school with Ong Kock Hua taking over as the third Principal of JVSS. It was under his tenure that the Cluster Science Learning Centre was officially opened on 19 April 2002. The Guest of Honour was Professor Leo Tan, Director, National Institute of Education. It was also during his tenure that the school celebrated its 10th anniversary. The celebrations were launched by Lim Boon Heng, Minister in the Prime Minister's Office and Member of Parliament for Jurong Group Representation Constituency, during the Speech and Prize-Giving Day on 9 May 2003.

== Merger with Hong Kah Secondary School ==
In 2019, JVSS merged with Hong Kah Secondary School; however, the Chinese name of the school bears Hong Kah's name. The merged school is located at the current Jurongville campus. The new Principal, Mr Chan Yew Wooi, was the former Director of Professional Development at the Academy of Singapore Teachers.

Hong Kah Secondary School started operation in 1994 with 14 Secondary One classes. There were 6 Express, 5 Normal (Academic) and 3 Normal (Technical) classes. It was the holding school for Pioneer Secondary School.
