= Mac Belo =

Filipino basketball player (born 1993)

FEU Tamaraws
- Position: Assistant Coach

Personal information
- Born: February 12, 1993 (age 33) Midsayap, Cotabato, Philippines
- Listed height: 6 ft 4 in (1.93 m)
- Listed weight: 185 lb (84 kg)

Career information
- High school: St. Mary's Academy of Midsayap (Midsayap, Cotabato); Notre Dame of Midsayap College (Midsayap, Cotabato)
- College: FEU (2012–2015)
- PBA draft: 2016: Special draft
- Drafted by: Blackwater Elite
- Playing career: 2016–2024
- Coaching career: 2026–present

Career history

Playing
- 2016–2020: Blackwater Elite
- 2021–2023: Meralco Bolts
- 2023–2024: Rain or Shine Elasto Painters

Coaching
- 2026–present: FEU (assistant)

Career highlights
- 3× PBA All-Star (2017–2019); UAAP champion (2015); UAAP Finals MVP (2015); UAAP Mythical Five (2014); 2x PBA D-League Champions (2016 Aspirants' Cup, 2016 Foundation Cup); PBA D-League MVP (2016 Aspirants' Cup)

Rey Mark G. "Mac" Belo (born February 12, 1993) is a Filipino professional basketball player who is the current assistant coach for the FEU Tamaraws of the University Athletic Association of the Philippines (UAAP).

== Early life ==
Hailing from Midsayap, Cotabato, Belo was born on February 12, 1993. His father is from Panay, Capiz and migrated to Cotabato. He attended St. Mary's Academy of Midsayap and Notre Dame of Midsayap College for his high school education.

Belo's brother was in the military. He taught Mac how to play basketball and the discipline needed to become a basketball athlete. They often played without shoes. He joined the varsity team of Saint Mary's Academy of Midsayap only during his senior year.

When he was 19 years old, Belo played in the CHED National Games, and caught the eye of some scouts, including Bert Flores, who was the head coach of the FEU Tamaraws back then. JRU was also interested in him. Some time after the games, when JRU didn't call him back, he decided to text Flores. Coach Flores immediately offered him the chance to try out with FEU.

== College career ==
During his college years, Belo played for his college's basketball team, the FEU Tamaraws which competes at the UAAP.

He was known for his buzzer beating 3-point winning shot against the De La Salle Green Archers in UAAP Season 77 that brought the FEU Tamaraws back to the finals for the first time since 2011 but eventually lost in 3 games to the NU Bulldogs. He was also a member of the Mythical Five for that season.

In UAAP Season 78, he was known for his second buzzer beating winning shot against the Ateneo Blue Eagles 76–74 that brought FEU back to the finals for the second straight year. He was named the Finals MVP in Game 3 in their win against the UST Growling Tigers. He had cramps that game, yet finished with 23 points and 8 boards, finishing the finals with 17.3 points and 10.3 rebounds a game. Belo was also honored as the Player of the Year in the UAAP-NCAA Collegiate Basketball Awards.

Belo decided to skip UAAP Season 79 on his last year with FEU to focus with his career with the Philippines national basketball team.

== Amateur career ==
At the PBA D-League, he played for the Boracay Rum Waves and later with Phoenix-FEU Accelarators.

With Phoenix, Belo led his team to the finals of the 2016 PBA D-League Aspirant's Cup and was named MVP of the tournament. He also broke a league record when he scored 41 points in a game against Caida Tile Masters.

== Professional career ==
=== Blackwater Elite (2016–2020) ===
Belo was selected by the Blackwater Elite in the special 2016 PBA draft. He scored 17 points, 9 rebounds and 2 assists in his debut. That week, he received his first Player of the Week after the Elite went 2–0 in the Philippine Cup. He was also part of the Mindanao All-Stars in the PBA All-Star Week, but didn't play because of a meniscus tear on his left knee. This injury kept him out for most of the Commissioner's Cup. He returned to playing for them after four months in a 93–118 loss to the San Miguel Beermen in the Governor's Cup.

The next season, Belo was able to play in all three All-Star games, first for Mindanao, then the last two for Gilas Pilipinas. The Elite were able to qualify for the Governor's Cup playoffs that season with the 5th seed, but lost to Magnolia in the first round.

In the 2019 season, he was included in his third All-Star game. The Elite did not qualify for the Philippine Cup playoffs, but made the playoffs for the Commissioner's Cup as the third seed. They lost Game 1 of the best-of three quarterfinals against the Rain or Shine Elasto Painters, but staved off elimination by winning Game 2 with Belo scoring 14 points. Rain or Shine won the third game, knocking off the elite. That would be the highlight of their season as the Elite failed to make the playoffs again for the Governor's Cup. They finished the season with an 11–22 elimination record.

Belo was injured before the start of the 2020 Philippine Cup with a knee injury, but was able to recover during the lockdowns. In their first game, Belo scored 16 points for their first win of the season. They got their second win against the NLEX Road Warriors. He missed a game due to back spasms, but played through it the rest of their games. The Elite ended their season with eight straight losses, finishing 2–9.

=== Meralco Bolts (2021–2023) ===
On February 4, 2021, Belo was traded to Meralco Bolts for Baser Amer and Bryan Faundo. Belo debuted with a career high 27 points with 9 rebounds. He then scored 22 points in a win over Magnolia. He helped Meralco secure a twice-to-beat advantage for the 2021 Philippine Cup playoffs with 16 points, seven rebounds, and five assists in a win over NLEX. Meralco finished the elimination round as the #2 seed for the playoffs. They made it to the semis, where they were eliminated by Magnolia.

However, because Meralco had depth at his position, especially in import conferences, Belo saw less playing time. After the 2022–23 PBA season, Belo became a restricted free agent.

=== Rain or Shine Elasto Painters (2023–2024) ===
On May 18, 2023, Belo's playing rights was traded to the Rain or Shine Elasto Painters for Norbert Torres. On May 30, Belo signed a one-year contract with the Elasto Painters. Coming off the bench, he helped Rain or Shine make its first semifinals appearance in five years during the 2024 Philippine Cup. On June 24, 2024, he was released by the team, as Rain or Shine was leaning toward its younger players.

=== Zamboanga Valientes ===
Later that year, Belo signed with the Zamboanga Valientes for The Asian Tournament.

== Career statistics ==
Legend
GP	Games played	MPG	Minutes per game
FG%	Field-goal percentage	3P%	3-point field-goal percentage	FT%	Free-throw percentage
RPG	Rebounds per game	APG	Assists per game	SPG	Steals per game
BPG	Blocks per game	PPG	Points per game	**Bold**	Career high

As of the end of 2023–24 season

=== PBA season-by-season averages ===
Year	Team	GP	MPG	FG%	3P%	FT%	RPG	APG	SPG	BPG	PPG
2016–17	Blackwater	24	25.7	.381	.296	.867	5.2	1.3	**1.0**	.3	10.4
2017–18	Blackwater	31	24.5	.419	.310	.721	4.1	1.5	.9	**.4**	10.7
2019	Blackwater	**36**	**26.2**	**.442**	.329	.741	**5.9**	**2.0**	**1.0**	**.4**	**12.3**
2020	Blackwater	10	23.2	.382	**.341**	.750	5.3	1.0	.8	.1	11.4
2021	Meralco	33	15.0	.413	.265	.709	3.5	.8	.4	**.4**	6.5
2022–23	Meralco	9	3.9	.273	.000	**1.000**	1.0	—	—	—	.9
2023–24	Rain or Shine	18	9.8	.344	.308	.688	2.5	.5	.1	.2	3.6
Career		161	20.2	.411	.305	.761	4.4	1.2	.7	.3	8.8

=== College ===
==== Elimination Rounds ====
Year	Team	GP	MPG	FG%	3P%	FT%	RPG	APG	SPG	BPG	PPG
2012–13	FEU	12	11.7	.500	**.500**	.632	3.2	.5	.2	.8	4.1
2013–14	FEU	**14**	21.	.452	.368	.667	**7.6**	1.1	.4	.7	9.1
2014–15	FEU	**14**	**26.3**	**.515**	.292	.696	7.1	**2.5**	.4	.8	**16.1**
2015–16	FEU	**14**	25.0	.431	.326	**.702**	6.2	2.3	**.5**	**.9**	12.7
Career		54	21.4	.472	.330	.686	6.1	1.6	.4	.8	10.7

==== Playoffs ====
Year	Team	GP	MPG	FG%	3P%	FT%	RPG	APG	SPG	BPG	PPG
2013–14	FEU	2	21.0	.429	.250	.000	4.0	**1.5**	.0	.0	7.0
2014–15	FEU	**6**	**29.0**	.411	**.407**	**.793**	7.5	1.3	**.8**	.7	**18.7**
2015–16	FEU	4	24.9	**.450**	.000	.756	**10.3**	0.3	.0	**1.3**	16.8
Career		12	26.3	.423	.342	.761	7.8	1.0	.4	.8	16.1

== National team career ==
Belo has played for the Philippines national basketball team in various international basketball tournaments such as the 2013 and 2015 Southeast Asian Games, the 2015 SEABA Championship, the 2016 SEABA Cup, and the 2016 FIBA Asia Challenge. He could have been a part of the Gilas roster for the 2017 SEABA Championship if not for a meniscus tear on his left knee. He was also played for the Philippines in the 2017 Jones Cup.

Belo was also part of the Philippine squad that participated at the 2016 FIBA 3x3 World Championships.
