= Ngô Tuấn Trung =

Vietnamese basketball player

Thang Long Warriors
- Position: Point guard
- League: VBA

Personal information
- Born: February 10, 1985 (age 40); Ho Chi Minh City, Vietnam
- Listed height: 5 ft 9 in (1.75 m)
- Listed weight: 161 lb (73 kg)

Career information
- Playing career: 2012–present

Career history
- 2012–2015: Saigon Heat
- 2016–2017: Hochiminh City Wings
- 2018-present: Thang Long Warriors

Ngô Tuấn Trung (born february 10, 1985) is a Vietnamese professional basketball player for the Thang Long Warriors of the Vietnam Basketball Association (VBA).

== Pro career ==
Ngô joined the Heat in their second season of the ABL.

== Career statistics ==
Legend
GP	Games played	GS	Games started	MPG	Minutes per game
FG%	Field goal percentage	3P%	3-point field goal percentage	FT%	Free throw percentage
RPG	Rebounds per game	APG	Assists per game	SPG	Steals per game
BPG	Blocks per game	PPG	Points per game	**Bold**	Career high

=== VBA ===
Year	Team	GP	GS	MPG	FG%	3P%	FT%	RPG	APG	SPG	BPG	PPG
2016	Hochiminh City	**20**	**14**	**25.6**	**.460**	**.350**	.560	3.0	**5.7**	1.4	**.3**	**3.1**
2017	Hochiminh City	8	6	20.1	.280	.180	.560	**3.4**	3.4	**1.8**	.1	2.5
Career		28	20	23.3	.370	.270	.560	3.2	4.6	1.6	.2	2.8
