= Ng Han Bin =

Singaporean basketball player (born 1989)

No. 17 – Singapore Adroit
- Position: Shooting guard
- League: NBL Singapore

Personal information
- Born: 13 January 1989 (age 37) Singapore

Career information
- Playing career: 2010–present

Career history
- 2010–2023: Singapore Slingers
- 2023-present: Adroit Club
Medals
Men's basketball
Representing Singapore
Southeast Asian Games
| Bronze medal – third place | 2013 Naypyidaw | Team |
| Bronze medal – third place | 2015 Singapore | Team |

Ng Han Bin (born 13 January 1989) is a Singaporean basketball player who plays for the Singapore Slingers in the Asean Basketball League (ABL).

== Career ==
=== Singapore Slingers ===
On 1 September 2010, Ng was one of the four new rookies, together with Shengyu Lim, Teo Chin Hoe and Chase Tan that signed with the Singapore Slingers in the team's attempt to booster a bigger and taller line-up as compared to previous seasons.

=== Singapore National Team ===
Ng is also a member of the men's Singapore national basketball team. He won the Bronze medals for both 2013 Naypyidaw and 2015 Singapore.

== Filmography ==
| Year | Title | Role | Notes | Ref |
|---|---|---|---|---|
| 2014 | Meeting the Giant | Gao Ming | | |

== See also ==
- FIBA Asia Championship
- Singapore national basketball team
- ASEAN Basketball League
- Singapore Slingers
