= Pro-Am Singapore Basketball League =

Singaporean basketball league

PRO-AM Singapore Basketball League
- Sport: Basketball
- Founded: October 10, 2013; Delta Sports and Recreation Centre
- First season: 2014
- CEO: Zoran Vasiljev
- Motto: "Grassroots to Glory"
- No. of teams: 12
- Countries: Singapore
- Continent: FIBA Asia
- Most recent champion: Singapore Supras Basketball Club (1st title)
- Most titles: Adroit Sports Association; Falcons Basketball Club; Singapore Supras (1 title each)
- Broadcaster: VoxTV

The PRO-AM Singapore Basketball League (PRO-AM SBL) was the preeminent men's pro–am basketball league in Singapore.

Twelve clubs participated in the league's inaugural season in 2014, which culminated with Adroit Sports Association emerging as the first PRO-AM SBL champions on 29 June 2014 after they beat the LJE Bobcats with an 81–79 scoreline.

== History ==
The idea of a Pro-Am basketball league was first sparked off by Zoran Vasiljev, the founder and CEO of Affinitiv Capital LLP, a Singapore-based equity firm. The Serbian-born Singaporean, a former cager who played college basketball in the U.S as well as professionally in Europe, envisioned a local basketball league which provided opportunities for personal growth and development of youth athletes while also reinforcing positive influences, self-confidence, self-esteem and the ability to excel on and off the court.

The formation of a new Pro-Am league was announced on 22 December 2013. In order to fulfill this, Sportfolio Group LLP was incorporated by Vasiljev for the purpose of managing the new league.

The league tipped off officially on 12 January 2013, kick-starting a five-month competition that saw 132 games played between the 12 founding teams across multiple venues around Singapore. The inaugural season was seen by over 24,000 fans and featured 285 players from 26 countries, and was covered by most of the local media (Channel News Asia, The Straits Times, The New Paper, Today, 93.8 Live Radio and Liahne Zabao).

== Teams ==
The Pro-Am SBL originated with 12 teams in 2013 with the initial founding teams spread across Singapore. The teams included players from all communities, including expats and import guest players.

The inaugural season was a great success, and besides receiving recognition by the FIBA and the regional basketball fraternity, the league has clearly differentiated from any other recreational or minor-league basketball organization in Singapore.

Team	Location	Joined
Adroit Sports Association	Woodlands, Singapore	2013
AMK Bravehearts	Ang Mo Kio, Singapore	2014
Falcons Basketball Club	Central, Singapore	2014
Eunos United Basketball Club	Eunos, Singapore	2015
GHUB Basketball Club	Queenstown, Singapore	2015
Zeagues Basketball Academy	Orchard, Singapore	2014
Tagawa Basketball Club	Singapore	2015
Singapore Supras	Singapore	2013
SinKee Basketball	Joo Chiat, Singapore	2013
SG Basketball Club	Singapore	2015
SAFSA	Singapore	2014
PROFORM Basketball Club	Singapore	2014

== See also ==
- Sport in Singapore
- National Basketball League
