= Ewon Arayi =

Filipino basketball player

San Sebastian Stags
- Position: Assistant coach
- League: NCAA PH

Personal information
- Born: November 5, 1985 (age 41) Bolinao, Pangasinan, Philippines
- Listed height: 5 ft 5 in (1.65 m)

Career information
- College: Adamson
- Playing career: 2001–2015

Career history

Playing
- 2025: Philippine Navy Lady Sailors

Coaching
- 2025: Philippine Navy Lady Sailors
- 2026–present: San Sebastian

Career highlights
- UAAP MVP (2004)
Medals
Women's basketball
Representing Philippines
SEABA Championship
Gold medal – first place	2010 Manila	Team
Women's 3x3 basketball
Bronze medal – third place	2012 Haiyang	Team

Merenciana Ewonritseorlagha Arayi (born November 5, 1985) is a Filipino basketball and netball player, who has served as the longest-tenured player and team captain of the Philippines women's national basketball team (Perlas Pilipinas, formerly Discovery Perlas) since the SEABA Championships in 2007. She is also the founder and president of the pioneering women's basketball league in the Philippines, the Pinay Ballers League.She currently served as the assistant coach for the San Sebastian Stags of the National Collegiate Athletic Association (NCAA).

== Playing career ==
Arayi was five months old when her father Gabriel, a criminology graduate went to Lagos to become a policeman. He returned to the Philippines when she was 16 years old.

Fresh from high school from Bolinao, Arayi's father brought her to Manila in 2001 to try-out with the Adamson Falcons women's basketball team led by coach Emelia Vega, who been stayed as a player and one of the team's constant performers in the UAAP during her collegiate career.

After her collegiate stint, she worked in a call center company. In 2007, Coach Haydee Ong of the Perlas Pilipinas national team recruited Arayi to join the national team. From then on, she was a many-time national team member of Perlas Pilipinas, having represented the country in different international competitions such as the Southeast Asian Games and the SEABA Championship, the latest of which is the 2015 FIBA Asia Women's Championship, when the Philippines received Level II ranking in the 2017 FIBA Asia Championship for Women. She was set to enlist as a member of the Philippine Navy.

In 2015, Arayi announced that she would retire after the 2015 Southeast Asian Games, where the Philippine team ended at 4th place, but didn't push through after her stint as the Point Guard of the team in the FIBA Asia Women's Championship.

== Basketball Coaching ==
In 2017, Arayi was tapped by Jubilee Christian Academy to coach its Girls’ team where she has led the team to the top of the Filipino-Chinese league. She has also conducted basketball clinics in the far-flung provinces.

In 2025, Arayi became a playing coach for the Philippine Navy Lady Sailors of the Women's Maharlika Pilipinas Basketball League.

In January 2026, Arayi was announced as part of Tony Tan's coaching staff for the San Sebastian Stags.

== Pinay Ballers League ==
In 2014, she formed the Pinay Ballers League (PiBa League), a women's basketball league that aiming to have contributions to the national team. Her experience playing internationally was one of the reasons why she formed the league. The league is an avenue for former collegiate players and members of the national team to play in the professional ranks and to continue playing the sport.

== Netball ==
In 2022, Arayi was part of the Philippines national netball team which won silver at the International Netball Event in Jeonju, South Korea. She was also part of the Siklab team that won the netball bronze medal in the 2025 SEA Games.

== Personal life ==
Arayi is a member of Athletes in Action Christian ministry.
