= Tay Ping Hui =

Singaporean actor (born 1970)

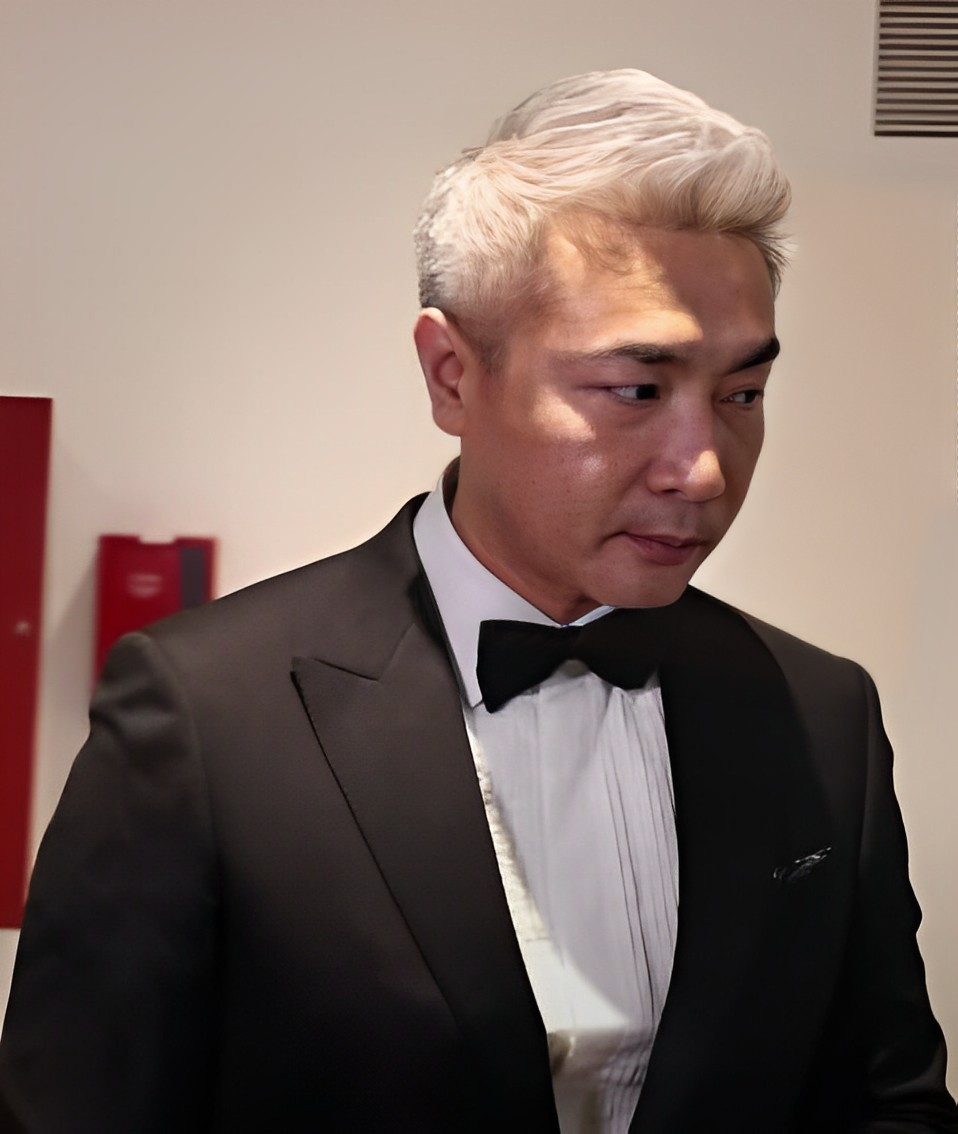
- Tay at the Star Awards 2017
- Born: 10 November 1970 (age 56); Singapore
- Education: Catholic High School; Catholic Junior College
- Alma mater: National University of Singapore
- Occupations: Actor; film director
- Years active: 1998−present
- Agent(s): GHY Culture & Media
- Spouse: Edna Lim (m. 2010)
- Awards: Full list

Chinese name
- Traditional Chinese: 鄭斌輝
- Simplified Chinese: 郑斌辉
- Hanyu Pinyin: Zhèng Bīnhuī
- Hokkien POJ: Tēⁿ Pin-hui

Tay Ping Hui (born 10 November 1970) is a Singaporean actor and director, known for starring in many Chinese-language television dramas in Singapore and mainland China. In 2014, Tay made his directorial debut with the basketball film Meeting the Giant.

Widely regarded as an "Ah-Ge" (阿哥, "big brother") of Caldecott Hill for being one of the most successful actors in Singapore's Chinese-language entertainment industry, Tay won his first Star Awards for Best Actor, after being nominated in that category eight times.

== Early life and education ==
Tay attended Catholic High School (Primary and Secondary) and Catholic Junior College. He was conferred a Bachelor of Arts degree with a double major in Economics and Political Science from the Faculty of Arts and Social Sciences of the National University of Singapore.

== Career ==
=== Rise to fame ===
At 18, Tay was scouted by top Singaporean model Seraphina Fong on the streets to model, which he took as a way to pay for his university education. After he graduated from university, Tay was a general manager for Subway for five years and was planning to pursue an MBA at Harvard University before he was scouted to join Television Corporation of Singapore.

Barely a year after his debut in On the Edge - Mr Personality, Tay won the "Best Supporting Actor" award at the 1999 Star Awards for his portrayal of a gang leader in Stepping Out.

=== Established Leading Man ===
Following his Star Award "Best Supporting Actor" win, Tay quickly established himself as one of Singapore's most prominent actors, playing leading roles in both English and Mandarin productions. Tay was also recognised in Lianhe Zaobao's " Top 50 Most Popular Asian Idol" for five consecutive years.

While Tay was often cast in policeman roles in dramas such as C.I.D., Honour and Passion and C.L.I.F., it was his role as a crude Ah beng-turned-chef in Bountiful Blessings that earned him his first Star Awards for Best Actor, after being nominated in that category eight times.

In addition to his starring roles in Singapore productions, Tay also acted in Hong Kong film productions such as Summer Holiday directed by Jingle Ma, starring with Hong Kong actress Sammi Cheng, and Infernal Affairs II alongside Anthony Wong and Francis Ng. Tay also performed in stage play Butterflies are Free, handpicked by Hong Kong film director Clifton Ko as well as the mandarin stage musical Don't Forget to Say Good Bye (记得说再见).

Tay made his mainland Chinese production debut as Huang Feihu in the China -produced supernatural fantasy television series The Legend and the Hero alongside China Megastar Fan Bing Bing, Liu De Kai and Taiwanese Star Ma Jing Tao.

In 2013, Tay made his feature film directorial debut with a Singapore-China co-production Meeting the Giant, first of its kind in such collaboration in the local movie industry. The movie was screened in Singapore and China.

In 2018, Tay left Mediacorp and shifted his focus to acting in China. Tay signed on with Perfect World Pictures (Singapore) in 2018, a China-based agency that was subsequently renamed to GHY Culture & Media. During his time in China, Tay played prominent roles, including the roles of Genghis Khan in The Legend of the Condor Heroes and Yan Nantian in Handsome Siblings.

While Tay mostly acted in mainland Chinese productions, he still returned to Singapore to film sporadically. In March 2023, Tay joined the cast in the second season of Titoudao, a televised drama adaptation of a stageplay with the same title.

=== Becoming A Freelance Actor ===
In 2024, Tay made a significant career move by parting ways with his China-based agency GHY Culture & Media to pursue freelance acting opportunities. Expressing his aspirations for Hollywood, he unveiled his ambition to explore new horizons in the entertainment industry. Tay revealed that he had previously auditioned for a role in The Brothers Sun, but was unsuccessful.

=== Other ===
Tay has also performed live numerous times on stage for events such as National Day and New Year's Day countdown and has performed alongside Taiwanese stars Wu Bai and Harlem Yu. He has also performed the theme songs of several MediaCorp series such as The Unbeatables III and Double Happiness I. His recording of Follow Me (跟着我一起) from Honour and Passion was named the Best Drama Theme Song at the Star Awards 2007.

== Personal life ==
In 2010, Tay married Edna Lim, a university lecturer.

== Filmography ==
=== Television series ===
Year	Title	Role	Notes	Ref.
1999	Are You My Brother? (错体双宝)	Liu Dongcheng		
1999	Stepping Out	Liu Mei	Won - Best Supporting Actor, Star Awards 1999	
2000	My Home Affairs (家事)	Hong Guoren		
2000	As You Like It (随心所遇)	Pierre		
2000	The Stratagem(世纪攻略)	Zhuo Lingfeng		
2001	A War Diary	Lim Teck Meng		
2001	The Reunion	Liu Yazhou		
2001	The Hotel	Bill Fong		
2002	Fantasy (星梦情真)	Song Ziqian		
2002	The Unbeatables III	Luo Shenfeng/ Luo Yifeng		
2002	Health Matters (一切由慎开始)	Jeffrey		
2003	Love is Beautiful (美丽家庭)	Zheng Liheng		
2003	A Child's Hope	Huang Junsheng		
2003	Always on my Mind (无炎的爱)	Tiger Li Xiaohu		
2003	Brothers 4			
2004	Spice Siblings	Wen He		
2004	The Ties that Bind (家财万贯)	Ma Yucai		
2004	My Mighty In-Laws (野蛮亲家)	Simon		
2004	Devil Blues (叛逆战队)	Di Jun		
2005	A Life of Hope	Su Dongping		
2005	Destiny	Shen Jingwen		
2006	C.I.D.	Chen Long (Sean)		
2007	Mars vs Venus	Liu Yifan (Steven)		
2007	Honour and Passion	Bao Wenjing		
2007	The Golden Path	Huang Kaijie		
2008	The Truth	Lu Zhiwei		
2008	La Femme	Huang Quanhe		
2008	Crime Busters x 2	Lü Daxiong		
2009	The Dream Catchers	Wang Zhiwei		
2009	The Ultimatum	Sun Jie		
2009	Baby Bonus	Li Jiacheng		
2010	New Beginnings	Li Zihao		
2010	Unriddle	Zhang Yuze		
2010	The Family Court	Shen Xiping		
2011	C.L.I.F.	Zhong Yida		
2011	Bountiful Blessings	Xie Donghai	Won - Best Actor, Star Awards 2012	
2012	Rescue 995	Huang Yixun		
2012	Unriddle 2	Zhang Yuze	Won - Best Supporting Actor, Star Awards 2013	
2012	Keong Saik Street	Kelvin		
2013	Break Free	Li Tianming		
2013	Start-Up! 创！	Fang Qicai		
2013	96°C Café	Lao Jingfeng		
2013	Love at Risk	Wu Qishan		
2014	World at Your Feet	Hong Canghai		
2015	Love? (限量爱情)	Tay		
2015	Mind Game	Liang Wenjie		
2015	Tanglin	Peter Tay		
2015	Crescendo	Jiang Chufan		
2016	Soul Reaper (勾魂使者)	Chen Haotian		
2016	Hero	Rice King		
2017	The Lead	Himself		
2017	The Legend of the Condor Heroes	Genghis Khan		
2018	Babies On Board	Sun Zhihui		
2019	Mind's Eye (心眼)	Yiwei		
2020	Handsome Siblings	Yan Nantian		
2021	Crouching Tiger Hidden Ghost (卧虎藏鬼)	Ralph Lee		

=== Film ===
Year	Title	Role	Notes	Ref.
2014	Meeting the Giant	Eagles player	Also director and writer	
2020	Precious Is the Night	A mysterious man		
2025	Magik Rompak	Tan Sri Hamdan Tan		
2026	Luck My Life	Gu Lei		

=== Web series ===
Year	Title	Role	Notes	Ref.
TBA	Miss Tanya		Douyin miniseries	

=== Variety and reality show ===
Year	Title	Notes	Ref.
2023	Chu Fa Ba! Shan Guang De Ni (出发吧！闪光的你)	Guest appearance	

== Discography ==
=== Drama soundtrack ===
Year	Song title	Drama	Other artist(s)	Ref
2002	灰色地带	The Unbeatables III		
2004	有家是福}	喜临门	Jeff Wang, Huang Shi Yu	
2007	跟着我一起	宝家卫国		
2017	初衷	第一主角		
2018	爱以外的意外	新生	Lin Si Tong	

== Awards and nominations ==
Year	Ceremony	Category	Nominated work	Result	Ref
1998	Star Awards	Best Newcomer	On the Edge: Mr Personality	Nominated	
1999	Star Awards	Best Supporting Actor	Stepping Out (as Liu Mei)	Won	
1999	Star Awards	Top 10 Most Popular Male Artistes	—N/a	Nominated	
1999	The New Paper Flame Award	Turn-off of the Year	—N/a	Nominated	
2000	Star Awards	Best Actor	My Home Affairs (as Hong Guoren)	Nominated	
2000	Star Awards	Top 10 Most Popular Male Artistes	—N/a	Won	
2001	Star Awards	Top 10 Most Popular Male Artistes	—N/a	Won	
2002	Star Awards	Top 10 Most Popular Male Artistes	—N/a	Nominated	
2003	Star Awards	Best Actor	Love Is Beautiful (as Zheng Liheng)	Nominated	
2003	Star Awards	Best Theme Song	The Unbeatables III	Nominated	
2003	Star Awards	Top 10 Most Popular Male Artistes	—N/a	Won	
2004	Star Awards	Top 10 Most Popular Male Artistes	—N/a	Won	
2005	Star Awards	Best Actor	A Life of Hope (as Su Dongping)	Nominated	
2005	Star Awards	Top 10 Most Popular Male Artistes	—N/a	Won	
2006	Star Awards	Best Actor	C.I.D. (as Cheng Long Sean)	Nominated	
2006	Star Awards	Top 10 Most Popular Male Artistes	—N/a	Won	
2007	Star Awards	Best Actor	Mars VS Venus (as Liu Yifan Steven)	Nominated	
2007	Star Awards	Best Theme Song	Honour and Passion	Won	
2007	Star Awards	Top 10 Most Popular Male Artistes	—N/a	Won	
2009	Star Awards	Top 10 Most Popular Male Artistes	—N/a	Won	
2009	Star Awards	Best Actor	The Golden Path	Nominated	
2010	Star Awards	Best Actor	The Ultimatum (as Sun Jie)	Nominated	
2010	Star Awards	Top 10 Most Popular Male Artistes	—N/a	Won	
2011	Star Awards	Best Actor	The Family Court (as Shen Xiping)	Nominated	
2011	Star Awards	Top 10 Most Popular Male Artistes	—N/a	Won	
2012	Star Awards	Best Actor	Bountiful Blessings (as Xie Donghai)	Won	
2012	Star Awards	All-Time Favourite Artiste	—N/a	Won	
2012	Star Awards	Favourite Male Character	—N/a	Nominated	
2013	Star Awards	Best Supporting Actor	Unriddle 2 (as Zhang Yuze)	Won	
2014	Star Awards	Star Awards for Most Popular Regional Artiste (China)	—N/a	Nominated	
2014	Star Awards	Star Awards for Most Popular Regional Artiste (Indonesia)	—N/a	Nominated	
2014	Star Awards	Star Awards for Most Popular Regional Artiste (Malaysia)	—N/a	Nominated	
2014	Star Awards	Star Awards for Most Popular Regional Artiste (Cambodia)	—N/a	Nominated	
2015	Star Awards	Star Awards for Most Popular Regional Artiste (Indonesia)	—N/a	Nominated	
2015	Star Awards	Star Awards for Most Popular Regional Artiste (China)	—N/a	Nominated	
2015	Star Awards	Star Awards for Most Popular Regional Artiste (Cambodia)	—N/a	Nominated	
2016	Star Awards	Favourite Onscreen Couple	Crescendo (as Jiang Chufan)	Nominated	
2018	Star Awards	Best Theme Song	The Lead	Nominated	
