= Ratdech Kruatiwa =

Thai basketball player

Personal information
- Born: May 18, 1985 (age 41) Angthong, Thailand
- Listed height: 6 ft 3 in (1.91 m)
- Listed weight: 182 lb (83 kg)

Career information
- Playing career: 2003–2020
- Position: Shooting guard / small forward

Career history
- 2007–2008: Maryland Nighthawks
- 2009: Rochester RazorSharks
- 2009–2010: Thailand Tigers
- 2011–2012: Bangkok Cobras
- 2012-2013: Thew Charoen Aksorn
- 2013–2015: Nakhon Pathom Mad Goat
- 2015–2018: Mono Vampire

Career highlights
- 2x TBSL champion (2017,2018); 5x TBL champion (2012, 2014–2017)
Medals
Men's basketball
Representing Thailand
SEA Games
Silver medal – second place	2013 Naypyidaw	Team
Bronze medal – third place	2017 Malaysia	Team

Ratdech Kruatiwa (Thai: รัชเดช เครือทิวา; born May 18, 1985, in Angthong, Thailand) is a Thai professional basketball player. He currently plays for the Mono Vampire Basketball Club in the ASEAN Basketball League (ABL). Kruatiwa is arguably one of Thailand's most prominent basketball players.

Kruatiwa is the first Thai basketball player to play in a basketball league in the United States after he was signed by the Maryland Nighthawks of the Premier Basketball League.
