= Swimming at the 2009 SEA Games =

Swimming at the 2009 SEA Games was held in Vientiane, Laos from 10 to 14 December 2009. In this edition, the sport consisted of 32 events, swum in a long course (50m) pool.

== Results ==
=== Men's events ===
Event	Gold		Silver		Bronze	
50 m freestyle	Daniel Coakley; Philippines	22.62; GR	Arwut Chinnapasaen; Thailand	22.75	Russell Ong; Singapore	22.98
100 m freestyle	Daniel Bego; Malaysia	50.16; GR	Charles Walker; Philippines	50.96	Russell Ong; Singapore	51.05
200 m freestyle	Daniel Bego; Malaysia	1:49.22; GR	Miguel Molina; Philippines	1:51.71	Joshua Lim; Singapore	1:51.76
400 m freestyle	Daniel Bego; Malaysia	3:53.99; GR	Ryan Arabejo; Philippines	3:56.06	Sarit Tiewong; Thailand	3:57.79
1500 m freestyle	Ryan Arabejo; Philippines	15:37.75; GR	Kevin Yeap; Malaysia	15:51.80	Punyawee Sontana; Thailand	16:02.21
100 m backstroke	Glenn Victor Sutanto; Indonesia	56.42	Rainer Ng; Singapore	56.73	Zach Ong; Singapore	56.89
200 m backstroke	Zach Ong; Singapore	2:03.27	Ryan Arabejo; Philippines	2:04.36	Rainer Ng; Singapore	2:06.10
100 m breaststroke	Nguyễn Hữu Việt; Vietnam	1:01.60; GR	Indra Gunawan; Indonesia	1:01.92	Vorrawuti Aumpiwan; Thailand	1:02.60
200 m breaststroke	Nuttapong Ketin; Thailand	2:13.42; GR	Nguyễn Hữu Việt; Vietnam	2:15.25	Indra Gunawan; Indonesia	2:17.09
100 m butterfly	Daniel Bego; Malaysia	53.82; GR	Donny Utomo; Indonesia	55.53	Hoàng Quý Phước; Vietnam	55.65
200 m butterfly	Daniel Bego; Malaysia	2:00.61	Donny Utomo; Indonesia	2:00.90	Võ Thái Nguyên; Vietnam	2:01.34
200 m individual medley	Miguel Molina; Philippines	2:03.68	Nuttapong Ketin; Thailand	2:04.17	Joshua Lim; Singapore	2:05.33
400 m individual medley	Miguel Molina; Philippines	4:27.00	Nuttapong Ketin; Thailand	4:27.57	Võ Thái Nguyên; Vietnam	4:30.78
4 × 100 m freestyle relay	Singapore; Russell Ong; Joshua Lim; Danny Yeo; Zach Ong	3:23.22; GR	Philippines; Kendrick Uy; Charles Walker; Daniel Coakley; Miguel Molina	3:24.35	Indonesia; Triady Fauzi Sidiq; Glenn Victor Sutanto; Guntur Pratama; Brian Howard Ho	3:25.34
4 × 200 m freestyle relay	Singapore; Marcus Cheah; Joshua Lim; Clement Lim; Zach Ong	7:30.73; GR	Philippines; Charles Walker; Jessie Lacuna; Ryan Arabejo; Miguel Molina	7:31.10	Malaysia; Foo Jian Beng; Kevin Yeap; Kevin Lim; Daniel Bego	7:36.89
4 × 100 m medley relay	Indonesia; Guntur Pratama Putra; Indra Gunawan; Glenn Victor Sutanto; Triady Fauzi Sidiq	3:41.72; GR	Singapore; Rainer Ng; Ng Jia Hao; Clement Lim; Russell Ong	3:44.15	Philippines; Ryan Arabejo; Miguel Molina; James Walsh; Charles Walker	3:46.32

=== Women's events ===
Event	Gold		Silver		Bronze	
50 m freestyle	Amanda Lim; Singapore	25.82; GR	Quah Ting Wen; Singapore	25.88	Chui Lai Kwan; Malaysia	26.22
100 m freestyle	Quah Ting Wen; Singapore	56.03; GR	Natthanan Junkrajang; Thailand	56.33	Amanda Lim; Singapore	56.60
200 m freestyle	Quah Ting Wen; Singapore	2:00.57; GR	Natthanan Junkrajang; Thailand	2:01.65	Rutai Santadvatana; Thailand	2:03.90
400 m freestyle	Khoo Cai Lin; Malaysia	4:10.75; GR	Lynette Lim; Singapore	4:11.24	Quah Ting Wen; Singapore	4:17.85
800 m freestyle	Lynette Lim; Singapore	8:35.41; GR	Khoo Cai Lin; Malaysia	8:45.36	Rutai Santadvatana; Thailand	8:50.50
100 m backstroke	Tao Li; Singapore	1:02.96; GR	Shana Lim; Singapore	1:03.56	Chui Lai Kwan; Malaysia	1:03.91
200 m backstroke	Tao Li; Singapore	2:17.12	Chavisa Thaveesupsoonthorn; Thailand	2:19.87	Shana Lim; Singapore	2:20.98
100 m breaststroke	Siow Yi Ting; Malaysia	1:09.82; GR, NR	Roanne Ho; Singapore	1:12.54	Erika Kong; Malaysia	1:13.18
200 m breaststroke	Siow Yi Ting; Malaysia	2:30.35; GR	Cheryl Lim; Singapore	2:34.73	Phạm Thị Huệ; Vietnam	2:35.79
100 m butterfly	Tao Li; Singapore	59.24; GR	Marellyn Liew; Malaysia	1:01.04	Natnapa Prommuenwai; Thailand	1:01.79
200 m butterfly	Tao Li; Singapore	2:13.49; GR	Khoo Cai Lin; Malaysia	2:14.30	Kittiya Patarawadee; Thailand	2:14.64
200 m individual medley	Siow Yi Ting; Malaysia	2:14.57; GR	Natthanan Junkrajang; Thailand	2:18.98	Koh Hui Yu; Singapore	2:20.71
400 m individual medley	Natthanan Junkrajang; Thailand	4:55.07	Quah Ting Wen; Singapore	4:56.32	Koh Hui Yu; Singapore	4:56.73
4 × 100 m freestyle relay	Singapore; Mylene Ong (56.61); Amanda Lim (56.31); Lynette Lim (56.62); Quah Ting Wen (56.19)	3:45.73; GR	Thailand; Natthanan Junkrajang (56.22); Jiratida Phinyosophon (56.29); Natsaya Susuk (57.32); Benjaporn Sriphanomtorn (58.26)	3:48.09	Malaysia; Leung Chii Lin (58.23); Chui Lai Kwan (57.55); Siow Yi Ting (58.55); Khoo Cai Lin (57.07)	3:51.40
4 × 200 m freestyle relay	Singapore; Quah Ting Wen (2:02.13); Lynette Lim (2:00.83); Amanda Lim (2:05.26); Mylene Ong (2:03.53)	8:11.75; GR	Thailand; Benjaporn Sriphanomtorn (2:04.53); Rutai Santadvatana (2:02.41); Jiratida Phinyosophon (2:05.46); Natthanan Junkrajang (2:05.60)	8:18.00	Malaysia; Siow Yi Ting (2:08.99); Lai Wei Li (2:07.87); Hii Siew Siew (2:08.65); Khoo Cai Lin (2:03.61)	8:29.12
4 × 100 m medley relay	Singapore; Shana Lim (1:03.37); Roanne Ho (1:11.74); Tao Li (59.05); Quah Ting Wen (56.22)	4:10.38; GR	Malaysia; Chui Lai Kwan (1:04.03); Siow Yi Ting (1:10.40); Marellyn Liew (1:01.86); Khoo Cai Lin (56.89)	4:13.18	Thailand; Chavisa Thaveesupsoonthorn (1:06.73); Phiangkhwan Pawapotako (1:13.82); Natnapa Prommuenwai (1:01.85); Natthanan Junkrajang (57.49)	4:19.89

=== Medal standings ===
Rank	Nation	Gold	Silver	Bronze	Total
1	Singapore	14	8	11	33
2	Malaysia	9	5	6	20
3	Philippines	4	6	1	11
4	Thailand	2	9	8	19
5	Indonesia	2	3	2	7
6	Vietnam	1	1	4	6
Totals (6 entries)		32	32	32	96
