= Swimming at the 2009 SEA Games – Men's 50 metre freestyle =

Swimming – Men's 50 metre freestyle at the 2009 SEA Games
- Date: 13 December 2009
- Winning time: 22.62 GR

Medalists
| gold medal | Daniel Coakley | Philippines |
| silver medal | Arwut Chinnapasaen | Thailand |
| bronze medal | Russell Ong | Singapore |

The Men's 50 Freestyle swimming event at the 2009 SEA Games was held on December 13, 2009. Daniel Coakley of the Philippines won the event.

== Results ==
=== Final ===
| Place | Lane | Swimmer | Nation | Time | Notes |
|---|---|---|---|---|---|
| 1st place, gold medalist(s) | 4 | Daniel Coakley | Philippines | 22.62 | GR, NR |
| 2nd place, silver medalist(s) | 6 | Arwut Chinnapasaen | Thailand | 22.75 | NR |
| 3rd place, bronze medalist(s) | 5 | Russell Ong | Singapore | 22.98 | |
| 4 | 3 | Omar Suryaatmadja | Indonesia | 23.27 | |
| 5 | 7 | Foo Jian Beng | Malaysia | 23.48 | |
| 6 | 2 | Kendrick Uy | Philippines | 23.55 | |
| 7 | 1 | Jeffrey Su | Singapore | 23.89 | |
| 8 | 8 | Brian Howard Ho | Indonesia | 24.32 | |

=== Preliminary heats ===
| Rank | Heat | Swimmer | Nation | Time | Notes |
|---|---|---|---|---|---|
| 1 | H2 | Daniel Coakley | Philippines | 22.89 | Q |
| 2 | H1 | Russell Ong | Singapore | 23.05 | Q |
| 3 | H2 | Omar Suryaatmadja | Indonesia | 23.37 | Q |
| 4 | H1 | Arwut Chinnapasaen | Thailand | 23.54 | Q |
| 5 | H2 | Kendrick Uy | Philippines | 23.74 | Q |
| 6 | H2 | Foo Jian Beng | Malaysia | 23.88 | Q |
| 7 | H1 | Jeffrey Su Shirong | Singapore | 23.93 | Q |
| 8 | H1 | Brian Howard Ho | Indonesia | 24.07 | Q |
| 9 | H2 | Voon Lee Chen | Malaysia | 24.71 | |
| 10 | H1 | Thanyanant Phadungkiatwatana | Thailand | 24.76 | |
| 11 | H2 | Quy Phuoc Huang | Vietnam | 24.83 | |
| 12 | H1 | Zaw Phyo Aung | Myanmar | 26.73 | |
| 13 | H2 | Hem Thonponloeu | Cambodia | 27.50 | |
| 14 | H2 | Soulasane Phommasane | Laos | 27.92 | |
| 15 | H1 | Kun Narak | Cambodia | 29.06 | |
| 16 | H1 | Sonemina Phamixay | Laos | 29.57 | |
