= Malaysia at the 2009 SEA Games =

Malaysia at the 2009 Southeast Asian Games
- IOC code: MAS
- NOC: Olympic Council of Malaysia
- Website: www.olympic.org.my (in English)

in Vientiane
- Competitors: 348 in 21 sports
- Flag bearer: Yeoh Ken Nee (diving)
- Officials: 121
- Medals Ranked 4th: Gold 40 Silver 40 Bronze 59 Total 139

Southeast Asian Games appearances (overview)
- 1959; 1961; 1965; 1967; 1969; 1971; 1973; 1975; 1977; 1979; 1981; 1983; 1985; 1987; 1989; 1991; 1993; 1995; 1997; 1999; 2001; 2003; 2005; 2007; 2009; 2011; 2013; 2015; 2017; 2019; 2021; 2023; 2025; 2027; 2029

Malaysia competed in the 2009 Southeast Asian Games held in Vientiane, Laos from 8 to 18 December 2009. Malaysia competed in 21 of the 25 sports consisting 197 male and 151 female athletes, 154 male officers and 28 female officers. Dr. Ramlan Abdul Aziz, the Director General of National Sports Institute was the Chef de Mission of Malaysia. The contingent won 40 gold medals, 40 silver and 59 bronze to finish fourth in the medal standings. Excellent performance was shown by the men football team whom won the gold medal after 20 years and women's badminton team in team event after 34 years. Daniel Bego has been selected as the Best Male Athlete of the 25th SEA Games winning five gold medals and one bronze medal.

== Medal summary ==
=== Medals by sport ===
Sport	Gold	Silver	Bronze	Total	Rank
Archery	1	3	2	6	2
Athletics	6	6	4	16	5
Badminton	2	2	5	9	2
Billiards and snooker	0	2	1	3	6
Boxing	2	0	1	3	3
Cycling	0	1	2	3	4
Diving	6	1	2	9	1
Football	1	0	0	1	2
Golf	0	0	2	2	
Judo	0	1	3	4	
Karate	5	6	2	13	
— Pencak silat	4	0	6	10	
Pétanque	0	2	1	3	
Sepak takraw	0	1	1	2	
Shooting	0	6	5	11	
Swimming	9	5	6	20	2
Table tennis	0	0	3	3	4
Taekwondo	1	0	6	7	7
Tennis	0	0	1	1	4
Volleyball	0	0	1	1	4
Weightlifting	0	3	2	5	6
Wushu	3	1	3	7	3
Total	40	40	59	139	4

=== Medallists ===
Medal	Name	Sport	Event	Date
Gold	Cheng Chu Sian	Archery	Men's individual recurve	15 Dec
Gold	Mohd Zafril Mohd Zuslaini	Athletics	Men's 400 metres	17 Dec
Gold	Teoh Boon Lim	Athletics	Men's 20 kilometres road walk	15 Dec
Gold	Lee Hup Wei	Athletics	Men's high jump	17 Dec
Gold	Noraseela Mohd Khalid	Athletics	Women's 400 metres hurdles	
Gold	Roslinda Samsu	Athletics	Women's pole vault	17 Dec
Gold	Tan Song Hwa	Athletics	Women's hammer throw	15 Dec
Gold	Chin Eei Hui; Wong Pei Tty	Badminton	Women's doubles	17 Dec
Gold	Malaysia national badminton team: Chin Eei Hui; Wong Pei Tty; Wong Mew Choo; Goh Liu Ying; Lydia Cheah Li Ya; Chong Sook Chin; Woon Khe Wei	Badminton	Women's team	13 Dec
Gold	Mohammad Farkhan Mohd Haron	Boxing	Men's middleweight (75 kg)	17 Dec
Gold	Muhd Fairus Azwan Abdullah	Boxing	Men's light heavyweight (81 kg)	17 Dec
Gold	Yeoh Ken Nee	Diving	Men's 3 metre springboard	12 Dec
Gold	Bryan Nickson Lomas	Diving	Men's 10 metre platform	11 Dec
Gold	Bryan Nickson Lomas; Yeoh Ken Nee	Diving	Men's synchronised 3 metre springboard	13 Dec
Gold	Pandelela Rinong	Diving	Women's 10 metre platform	12 Dec
Gold	Leong Mun Yee; Ng Yan Yee	Diving	Women's synchronised 3 metre springboard	14 Dec
Gold	Leong Mun Yee; Pandelela Rinong	Diving	Women's synchronised 10 metre platform	13 Dec
Gold	Malaysia national under-23 football team: Ahmad Fakri Saarani; Baddrol Bakhtiar; Mohd Safiq Rahim; Norshahrul Idlan Talaha; Abdul Manaf Mamat; Mohd Aidil Zafuan Abdul Radzak; Mohd Amar Rohidan; Mohd Amirul Hadi Zainal; Mohd Nasriq Baharom; Mohd Zaquan Adha Abdul Radzak; S. Kunanlan	Football	Men's tournament	17 Dec
Gold	Puvaneswaran Ramasamy	Karate	Men's individual kumite 55 kg	12 Dec
Gold	Mohd Hatta Mahamut	Karate	Men's individual kumite 84 kg	11 Dec
Gold	Yamini Gopalasamy	Karate	Women's individual kumite 68 kg	12 Dec
Gold	Jamalliah Jamaluddin	Karate	Women's individual kumite +68 kg	11 Dec
Gold	Vasantha Marial Anthony; Vathana Gopalasamy; Jamalliah Jamaluddin	Karate	Women's team kumite	12 Dec
Gold	Mohd Hafiz Mahari	Pencak silat	Men's 45-50 kg	17 Dec
Gold	Mohd Fauzi Khalid	Pencak silat	Men's 70-75 kg	17 Dec
Gold	Faizal Abdullah	Pencak silat	Men's 80-85 kg	17 Dec
Gold	Emy Latip	Pencak silat	Women's 55-60 kg	17 Dec
Gold	Daniel Bego	Swimming	Men's 100 metre freestyle	11 Dec
Gold	Daniel Bego	Swimming	Men's 200 metre freestyle	
Gold	Daniel Bego	Swimming	Men's 400 metre freestyle	12 Dec
Gold	Daniel Bego	Swimming	Men's 100 metre butterfly	12 Dec
Gold	Daniel Bego	Swimming	Men's 200 metre butterfly	
Gold	Khoo Cai Lin	Swimming	Women's 400 metre freestyle	11 Dec
Gold	Siow Yi Ting	Swimming	Women's 100 metre breaststroke	11 Dec
Gold	Siow Yi Ting	Swimming	Women's 200 metre breaststroke	
Gold	Siow Yi Ting	Swimming	Women's 200 metre individual medley	10 Dec
Gold	Che Chew Chan	Taekwondo	Women's 67-73 kg	10 Dec
Gold	Loh Jack Chang	Wushu	Men's taijiquan and taijijian	16 Dec
Gold	Diana Bong Siong Lin	Wushu	Women's nanquan and nandao	15 Dec
Gold	Chai Fong Ying	Wushu	Women's taijiquan and taijijian	16 Dec
Silver	Arif Farhan Ibrahim Putra; Cheng Chu Sian; Fadzli Hisham Fauzi; Wan Khalmizam	Archery	Men's team recurve	16 Dec
Silver	Anbarasi Subramaniam	Archery	Women's individual recurve	
Silver	Fatin Nurfatehah Mat Salleh; Nurhidayah Abdul Latip; Saritha Cham Nong	Archery	Women's team compound	
Silver	Mohd Jironi Riduan	Athletics	Men's 800 metres	
Silver	Mohd Jironi Riduan	Athletics	Men's 1500 metres	17 Dec
Silver	Mohd Robani Hassan	Athletics	Men's 110 metres hurdles	16 Dec
Silver	Muhammad Idris Zakaria; Mohd Zafril Mohd Zuslaini; Muhammad Zaiful Zainal Abidin; Yuvaraj Panerselvam	Athletics	Men's 4 × 400 metres relay	
Silver	Adi Aliffuddin Hussin	Athletics	Men's shot put	
Silver	Ganthi Kumarasamy	Athletics	Women's 800 metres	
Silver	Koo Kien Keat; Tan Boon Heong	Badminton	Men's doubles	17 Dec
Silver	Malaysia national badminton team: Koo Kien Keat; Tan Boon Heong; Mohd Fairuzizuan Mohd Tazari; Chan Peng Soon; Mohd Zakry Abdul Latif; Liew Daren; Muhammad Hafiz Hashim	Badminton	Men's team	13 Dec
Silver	Thor Chuan Leong	Billiards and snooker	Men's snooker singles	
Silver	Lai Chee Wei; Thor Chuan Leong	Billiards and snooker	Men's snooker doubles	
Silver	Noor Azian Alias	Cycling	Women's 116.1 kilometres massed start	14 Dec
Silver	Traisy Vivien Tukiet	Diving	Women's 10 metre platform	12 Dec
Silver	Marjan Abdullah	Judo	Men's lightweight (66-73 kg)	
Silver	Tan Chee Sheng	Karate	Men's individual kata	10 Dec
Silver	Tan Chee Sheng; Leong Tze Wai; Kam Kah Sam	Karate	Men's team kata	10 Dec
Silver	Kunasilan Lakanathan	Karate	Men's individual kumite 60 kg	12 Dec
Silver	Puvaneswaran Ramasamy; Shaharudin Jamaludin; Mohd Hatta Mahamut; Kunasilan Lakanathan; Loganeshaa Rao Ramarow	Karate	Men's team kumite	12 Dec
Silver	Lim Lee Lee; Thoe Ai Poh; Chong Chew Teng	Karate	Women's team kata	10 Dec
Silver	Vathana Gopalasamy	Karate	Women's individual kumite 61 kg	11 Dec
Silver	Mohamad Nuzul Azwan Ahmad Temizi	Petanque	Men's shooting	
Silver	Mohd Firdaus Adli	Pétanque	Men's singles	
Silver	Hamikhairi Roslan; Norshahruddin Mad Ghani; Noor Azman Abdul Hamid; Syazwan Husin	Sepak takraw	Men's team	12 Dec
Silver	Hasli Izwan Amir Hasan	Shooting	Men's individual 25 metre rapid fire pistol	10 Dec
Silver	Hafiz Adzha; Hasli Izwan Amir Hasan; Khalel Abdullah	Shooting	Men's team 25 metre rapid fire pistol	
Silver	Mohd Hadafi Jaafar; Mohd Nurrahimin Abd Halim; Muhammad Zubair Mohammad	Shooting	Men's team 50 metre rifle prone three position	
Silver	Bibiana Ng Pei Chin	Shooting	Women's individual 25 metre pistol	17 Dec
Silver	Bibiana Ng Pei Chin	Shooting	Women's individual 10 metre air pistol	
Silver	Nur Ayuni Farhana Abdul Halim; Nur Suryani Taibi; Shahera Rahim Raja	Shooting	Women's team 10 metre air rifle	10 Dec
Silver	Kevin Yeap Soon Choy	Swimming	Men's 1500 metre freestyle	
Silver	Khoo Cai Lin	Swimming	Women's 800 metre freestyle	12 Dec
Silver	Marellyn Liew	Swimming	Women's 100 metre butterfly	12 Dec
Silver	Khoo Cai Lin	Swimming	Women's 200 metre butterfly	
Silver	Chui Lai Kwan; Khoo Cai Lin; Marellyn Liew; Siow Yi Ting	Swimming	Women's 4 × 100 metre medley relay	
Silver	Zulkifli Che Ros	Weightlifting	Men's 77 kg	
Silver	Mohd Faiz Musa	Weightlifting	Men's 94 kg	
Silver	Raihan Yusoff	Weightlifting	Women's 53 kg	10 Dec
Silver	Ang Eng Chong	Wushu	Men's changquan and gunshu	16 Dec
Bronze	Arif Farhan Ibrahim Putra	Archery	Men's individual recurve	
Bronze	Noor Aziera Taip	Archery	Women's individual recurve	
Bronze	Mathialagan Subramaniam	Athletics	Men's 800 metres	
Bronze	Mahendran Vadivellan	Athletics	Men's 1500 metres	17 Dec
Bronze	Muhd Hafizuddin	Athletics	Men's pole vault	
Bronze	Noraseela Mohd Khalid	Athletics	Women's 400 metres	17 Dec
Bronze	Wong Mew Choo	Badminton	Women's singles	17 Dec
Bronze	Lydia Cheah Li Ya	Badminton	Women's singles	17 Dec
Bronze	Mohd Fairuzizuan Mohd Tazari; Mohd Zakry Abdul Latif	Badminton	Women's singles	17 Dec
Bronze	Chan Peng Soon; Goh Liu Ying	Badminton	Mixed doubles	17 Dec
Bronze	Koo Kien Keat; Wong Pei Tty	Badminton	Mixed doubles	17 Dec
Bronze	Beh Shun Ting; Luk Teck Hua	Beach volleyball	Women's doubles	17 Dec
Bronze	Esther Kwan Suet Yee	Billiards and snooker	Women's eight-ball pool singles	
Bronze	Mohammad Ali Abdul Karim	Boxing	Men's bantamweight (54 kg)	
Bronze	Mohamed Zamri Salleh	Cycling	Men's 160.3 kilometres massed start	14 Dec
Bronze	Masziyaton Mohd Radzi	Cycling	Women's cross country	
Bronze	Muhammad Fakhrul Izzat Md Zain	Diving	Men's 3 metre springboard	12 Dec
Bronze	Leong Mun Yee	Diving	Women's 3 metre springboard	11 Dec
Bronze	Kelly Tan	Golf	Women's individual	14 Dec
Bronze	Ainil Johani Abu Bakar; Kelly Tan; Michelle Koh	Golf	Women's team	14 Dec
Bronze	Chong Wai Keat	Judo	Men's half middleweight (73-81 kg)	
Bronze	Noor Maizura Zainon	Judo	Women's extra lightweight (45-48 kg)	
Bronze	Nik Nor Baizura Nik Azman	Judo	Women's lightweight (52-57 kg)	
Bronze	Shaharudin Jamaludin	Karate	Men's individual kumite 75 kg	11 Dec
Bronze	Lim Lee Lee	Karate	Women's individual kata	10 Dec
Bronze	Mohamad Hafiz Mohamad Ariff; Muhammad Helmi Abd Aziz	Pencak silat	Men's artistic doubles	
Bronze	Shuhairi Chin	Pencak silat	Men's 50-55 kg	
Bronze	Mohd Islahidayat	Pencak silat	Men's 55-60 kg	
Bronze	Noor Farahana Ismail	Pencak silat	Women's 45-50 kg	
Bronze	Malini Mohamad	Pencak silat	Women's 50-55 kg	
Bronze	Siti Rahmah Mohamed Nasir	Pencak silat	Women's 65-70 kg	
Bronze	Mohd Faiza Mohamad; Shaari Hasan	Petanque	Men's doubles	
Bronze	Hamikhairi Roslan; Noor Azman Abdul Hamid; Syazwan Husin	Sepak takraw	Men's regu	
Bronze	Nur Ayuni Farhana Abdul Halim	Shooting	Women's individual 10 metre air rifle	10 Dec
Bronze	Bibiana Ng Pei Chin; Joseline Cheah Lee Yean; Siti Nur Masitah Mohd Badrin	Shooting	Women's team 10 metre air pistol	
Bronze	Bibiana Ng Pei Chin; Joseline Cheah Lee Yean; Siti Nur Masitah Mohd Badrin	Shooting	Women's team 25 metre pistol	17 Dec
Bronze	Muslifah Zulkifli; Nur Suryani Taibi; Shahera Rahim Raja	Shooting	Women's team 50 metre air rifle three position	
Bronze	Nor'ain Ibrahim; Nur Suryani Taibi; Shahera Rahim Raja	Shooting	Women's team 50 metre rifle prone	
Bronze	Daniel Bego; Foo Jian Beng; Kevin Lim; Kevin Yeap	Swimming	Men's 4 × 200 metre freestyle relay	10 Dec
Bronze	Chui Lai Kwan	Swimming	Women's 50 metre freestyle	
Bronze	Chui Lai Kwan	Swimming	Women's 100 metre backstroke	12 Dec
Bronze	Erika Kong Chia Chia	Swimming	Women's 100 metre breaststroke	
Bronze	Chui Lai Kwan; Khoo Cai Lin; Leung Chii Lin; Siow Yi Ting	Swimming	Women's 4 × 100 metre freestyle relay	11 Dec
Bronze	Hii Siew Siew; Khoo Cai Lin; Lai Wei Li; Siow Yi Ting	Swimming	Women's 4 × 200 metre freestyle relay	10 Dec
Bronze	Beh Lee Wei	Table tennis	Women's singles	
Bronze	Muhd Shakirin Ibrahim; Beh Lee Wei	Table tennis	Mixed doubles	
Bronze	Beh Lee Wei; Chiu Soo Jiin; Fan Xiao Jun; Ho Ying	Table tennis	Women's team	
Bronze	Harith Feizal Mat Nor	Taekwondo	Men's finweight (under 54 kg)	
Bronze	Mohd Afifuddin Omar Sidek	Taekwondo	Men's featherweight (63-68 kg)	
Bronze	Elaine Toe Shueh Fhern	Taekwondo	Women's flyweight (46-49 kg)	
Bronze	Nurul Nadia Mahamat	Taekwondo	Women's bantamweight (49-53 kg)	
Bronze	Lee Wan Yuen	Taekwondo	Women's heavyweight (+73 kg)	10 Dec
Bronze	Lee Jeng Yen	Taekwondo	Women's individual poomsae	9 Dec
Bronze	Jawairiah Noordin; Neesha Thirumalaichelvam; Adelle Chia Yan Boey; Choo Lyn Yee	Tennis	Women's team	
Bronze	Amirul Hamizan Ibrahim	Weightlifting	Men's 56 kg	10 Dec
Bronze	Zaira Zakaria	Weightlifting	Women's 48 kg	10 Dec
Bronze	Ng Say Yoke	Wushu	Men's changquan and gunshu	16 Dec
Bronze	Ng Say Yoke; Yeap Wai Kin	Wushu	Men's duilian with weapon	
Bronze	Diana Bong Siong Lin; Tai Cheau Xuen	Wushu	Women's duilian barehand	

== Aquatics ==
=== Diving ===
Men

Athlete	Event	Preliminary		Final	
Athlete	Event	Score	Rank	Score	Rank
Muhammad Fakhrul Izzat Md Zain	3 m springboard	—N/a		423.75	3rd place, bronze medalist(s)
Yeoh Ken Nee	3 m springboard	—N/a		450.45	1st place, gold medalist(s)
Abdul Rashid Muhammad	10 m platform	—N/a		308.15	6
Bryan Nickson Lomas	10 m platform	—N/a		476.15	1st place, gold medalist(s)
Bryan Nickson Lomas; Yeoh Ken Nee	3 m synchronized springboard	—N/a		406.32	1st place, gold medalist(s)

Women

Athlete	Event	Preliminary		Final	
Athlete	Event	Score	Rank	Score	Rank
Cheong Jun Hoong	3 m springboard	—N/a		258.25	5
Leong Mun Yee	3 m springboard	—N/a		279.30	3rd place, bronze medalist(s)
Pandelela Rinong	10 m platform	—N/a		362.95	1st place, gold medalist(s)
Traisy Vivien Tukiet	10 m platform	—N/a		334.65	2nd place, silver medalist(s)
Leong Mun Yee; Ng Yan Yee	3 m synchronized springboard	—N/a		294.72	1st place, gold medalist(s)
Leong Mun Yee; Pandelela Rinong	10 m synchronized platform	—N/a		300.84	1st place, gold medalist(s)

=== Swimming ===
Men

Athlete	Event	Heats		Final	
Athlete	Event	Time	Overall rank	Time	Rank
Chen Voon Lee	50 m freestyle	24.71	9	did not advance	
Foo Jian Beng	50 m freestyle	23.88	6 Q	23.48	5
Daniel Bego	100 m freestyle	51.63	1 Q	50.16 GR, NR	1st place, gold medalist(s)
Foo Jian Beng	100 m freestyle	54.33	7 Q	51.22	4
Daniel Bego	200 m freestyle	1:56.74	3 Q	1:49.22 GR, NR	1st place, gold medalist(s)
Kevin Yeap Soon Choy	200 m freestyle	1:59.56	8 Q	1:54.49	7
Daniel Bego	400 m freestyle	4:07.98	5 Q	3:53.99 GR, NR	1st place, gold medalist(s)
Kevin Yeap Soon Choy	400 m freestyle	4:06.71	2 Q	4:01.36	5
Kevin Lim Kar Meng	1500 m freestyle	—N/a		16:09.09	4
Kevin Yeap Soon Choy	1500 m freestyle	—N/a		15:51.80	2nd place, silver medalist(s)
Ian James Barr	100 m backstroke	59.51	2 Q	58.28	7
Melvin Chua	100 m backstroke	1:01.82	9	did not advance	
Ian James Barr	200 m backstroke	2:15.15	7 Q	2:11.06	7
Yap See Tuan	100 m breaststroke	1:05.16	6 Q	1:04.94	6
Yap See Tuan	200 m breaststroke	2:27.60	8 Q	2:23.08	7
Daniel Bego	100 m butterfly	57.04	5 Q	53.82 GR, NR	1st place, gold medalist(s)
Kevin Lim Kar Meng	100 m butterfly	58.52	7 Q	56.87	7
Daniel Bego	200 m butterfly	2:05.17	3 Q	2:00.61 NR	1st place, gold medalist(s)
Kevin Lim Kar Meng	200 m butterfly	2:08.25	7 Q	2:06.07	7
Ian James Barr	200 m individual medley	2:15.05	11	did not advance	
Melvin Chua	200 m individual medley	2:10.80	8 Q	2:09.68	7
Melvin Chua	400 m individual medley	—N/a		4:35.39	6
	4 × 100 m freestyle relay	—N/a		3:27.87 NR	4
Daniel Bego; Foo Jian Beng; Kevin Lim Kar Meng; Kevin Yeap Soon Choy	4 × 200 m freestyle relay	—N/a		7:36.89 NR	3rd place, bronze medalist(s)
	4 × 100 m medley relay	—N/a		3:48.93	4

Women

Athlete	Event	Heats		Final	
Athlete	Event	Time	Overall rank	Time	Rank
Chui Lai Kwan	50 m freestyle	26.22	1 Q	26.22	3rd place, bronze medalist(s)
Leung Chii Lin	50 m freestyle	27.15	6 Q	26.62	6
Chui Lai Kwan	100 m freestyle	58.25	5 Q	57.59 NR	6
Leung Chii Lin	100 m freestyle	58.75	7 Q	58.21	7
Heidi Gan	200 m freestyle	2:08.36	5 Q	2:07.79	7
Lai Wei Li	200 m freestyle	2:09.33	8 Q	2:06.36	6
Khoo Cai Lin	400 m freestyle	4:27.50	1 Q	4:10.75 GR, NR	1st place, gold medalist(s)
Lai Wei Li	400 m freestyle	4:29.71	6 Q	4:28.20	6
Khoo Cai Lin	800 m freestyle	—N/a		8:45.36 NR	2nd place, silver medalist(s)
Koh Hui Yu	800 m freestyle	—N/a		9:04.67	5
Chui Lai Kwan	100 m backstroke	1:05.84	3 Q	1:03.91 NR	3rd place, bronze medalist(s)
Karmen Cheng	100 m backstroke	1:09.27	10	did not advance	
Chan Kah Yan	200 m backstroke	2:28.71	8 Q	2:32.72	8
Karmen Cheng	200 m backstroke	2:34.52	10	did not advance	
Erika Kong Chia Chia	100 m breaststroke	1:15.04	8 Q	1:13.18	3rd place, bronze medalist(s)
Siow Yi Ting	100 m breaststroke	1:11.70	1 Q	1:09.82 GR, NR	1st place, gold medalist(s)
Christina Loh Yen Ling	200 m breaststroke	2:38.04	4 Q	2:41.03	6
Siow Yi Ting	200 m breaststroke	2:35.89	1 Q	2:30.35 GR	1st place, gold medalist(s)
Hii Siew Siew	100 m butterfly	1:04.05	8 Q	1:03.51	7
Marellyn Liew	100 m butterfly	1:03.69	3 Q	1:01.04 NR	2nd place, silver medalist(s)
Hii Siew Siew	200 m butterfly	2:19.70	2 Q	2:18.65	6
Khoo Cai Lin	200 m butterfly	2:22.09	7 Q	2:14.30	2nd place, silver medalist(s)
Erika Kong Chia Chia	200 m individual medley	2:31.01	6 Q	2:28.24	8
Siow Yi Ting	200 m individual medley	2:21.16	1 Q	2:14.57 GR, NR	1st place, gold medalist(s)
Lai Wei Li	400 m individual medley	5:27.23	9	did not advance	
Siow Yi Ting	400 m individual medley	5:11.21	2 Q	5:05.45	6
Chui Lai Kwan; Khoo Cai Lin; Leung Chii Lin; Siow Yi Ting	4 × 100 m freestyle relay	—N/a		3:51.40 NR	3rd place, bronze medalist(s)
Hii Siew Siew; Khoo Cai Lin; Lai Wei Li; Siow Yi Ting	4 × 200 m freestyle relay	—N/a		8:29.12	3rd place, bronze medalist(s)
Chui Lai Kwan; Khoo Cai Lin; Marellyn Liew; Siow Yi Ting	4 × 100 m medley relay	—N/a		4:13.18 NR	2nd place, silver medalist(s)

== Football ==
=== Men's tournament ===
Group A

Team	Pld	W	D	L	GF	GA	GD	Pts
Vietnam	4	3	1	0	14	3	+11	10
Malaysia	4	3	0	1	18	4	+14	9
Thailand	4	2	1	1	15	3	+12	7
Cambodia	4	1	0	3	5	15	−10	3
Timor-Leste	4	0	0	4	1	28	−27	0

2 December 2009
15:00

Malaysia	11 – 0	Timor-Leste
Talaha 3', 30'; Baddrol 12'; Zaquan 15'; Safiq 28'; Fakri 40', 70', 76'; Aidil 57'; Amirul Hadi 80'; Amar 90+2'	Report

New Laos National Stadium, Vientiane

6 December 2009
15:00

Vietnam	3 – 1	Malaysia
Thanh Bình 13'; Tiến Thành 25'; Trọng Hoàng 45+3'	Report	Hoàng Quảng 26' (o.g.)

New Laos National Stadium, Vientiane

8 December 2009
17:45

Cambodia	0 – 4	Malaysia
	Report	Manaf 36'; Talaha 77'; Kunalan 82'; Safiq 86'

Laos National Stadium, Vientiane

11 December 2009
15:00 UTC+7

Malaysia	2 – 1	Thailand
Nasriq 81'; Fakri 90+2'	Report	Sunthornpit 53'

New Laos National Stadium, Vientiane

Semifinal

14 December 2009
19:00

Laos	1 – 3	Malaysia
Sysomvang 74'		Baddrol 14', 78'; Safiq 85'

New Laos National Stadium, Vientiane

Gold medal match

17 December 2009
17:00

Vietnam	0 – 1	Malaysia
		Xuân Hợp 85' (o.g.)

New Laos National Stadium, Vientiane
Referee: Pratap Singh (India)

=== Women's tournament ===
Group stage

Team	Pld	W	D	L	GF	GA	GD	Pts
Thailand	4	2	2	0	22	5	+17	8
Vietnam	4	2	2	0	14	3	+11	8
Myanmar	4	1	3	0	11	5	+6	6
Laos	4	1	1	2	7	8	−1	4
Malaysia	4	0	0	4	1	34	−33	0

4 December 2009
13:30 UTC+7

Malaysia	0 – 14	Thailand
	Report	Supaporn 15', 34', 70'; Nisa 18', 42'; Thanatta 21'; Pitsamai 28', 56', 85'; Naphat 33'; Kanjana 39'; Kwanruethai 51'; Sunisa 77'; Orathai 81'

National University of Laos Stadium, Vientiane

6 December 2009
15:45 UTC+7

Malaysia	0 – 8	Vietnam
	Report	Đoàn Thị Kim Chi 17', 85'; Nguyễn Thị Muôn 21', 68'; Trần Thị Kim Hồng 29'; Nguyễn Thị Minh Nguyệt 51', 63'; Văn Thị Thanh 73'

National University of Laos Stadium, Vientiane

11 December 2009
13:30 UTC+7

Laos	5 – 0	Malaysia
Souphavanh Phayvanh 47', 74'; Sochitta Phonhalath 60', 68'; Khouanhta Syhanouvong 83'	Report

National University of Laos Stadium, Vientiane

13 December 2009
18:00 UTC+7

Myanmar	7 – 1	Malaysia
Khin Marlar Tun 19'; Moe Moe War 25'; Aye Nandar Hlang 33'; Thu Zar Htwe 35'; My Nilar Htwe 65'; Margret Marri 81'; Khin Moe Wai 88'	Report	Norhanisa Yasa 44'

Chao Anouvong Stadium, Vientiane

== Volleyball ==
=== Men's tournament ===
Group B

Pos	Team	Pld	W	L	Pts	SPW	SPL	SPR	SW	SL	SR
1	Indonesia	2	2	0	4	151	112	1.348	6	0	MAX
2	Vietnam	2	1	1	3	156	163	0.957	3	4	0.750
3	Malaysia	2	0	2	2	144	176	0.818	1	6	0.167

Date		Score		Set 1	Set 2	Set 3	Set 4	Set 5	Total
10 Dec	Malaysia	0–3	Indonesia	11–25	24–26	21–25			56–76
12 Dec	Indonesia	3–0	Vietnam	25–20	25–22	25–15			75–56
14 Dec	Vietnam	3–1	Malaysia	25–21	25–23	25–27	25–17		

Fifth and sixth place match

15 December 2009; 14:00 UTC+7	Laos	3–2	Malaysia	Gymnasium 2 National Sport Complex
15 December 2009; 14:00 UTC+7	(22–25, 22–25, 25–19, 25–16, 15–13)			Gymnasium 2 National Sport Complex
