= Swimming at the 2009 SEA Games – Women's 100 metre freestyle =

Swimming – Women's 100 metre freestyle at the 2009 SEA Games
- Date: 10 December 2009
- Winning time: 56.03 GR

Medalists
gold medal	Quah Ting Wen	Singapore
silver medal	Natthanan Junkrajang	Thailand
bronze medal	Amanda Lim	Singapore

The Women's 100 Freestyle swimming event at the 25th SEA Games was held on December 10, 2009.

== Results ==
=== Final ===
Place	Lane	Swimmer	Nation	Time	Notes
1st place, gold medalist(s)	4	Quah Ting Wen	Singapore	56.03	GR
2nd place, silver medalist(s)	5	Natthanan Junkrajang	Thailand	56.33	
3rd place, bronze medalist(s)	6	Amanda Lim	Singapore	56.60	
4	7	Jasmine Paler Alkhaldi	Philippines	57.43	
5	3	Jiratida Phinyosophon	Thailand	57.46	
6	2	Chui Lai Kwan	Malaysia	57.59	
7	1	Leung Chii Lin	Malaysia	58.21	
8	8	Enny Susilowati Margono	Indonesia	59.64	

=== Preliminary heats ===
Rank	Heat/Lane	Swimmer	Nation	Time	Notes
1	H2 L4	Quah Ting Wen	Singapore	56.95	Q
2	H2 L5	Natthanan Junkrajang	Thailand	57.28	Q
3	H2 L3	Jiratida Phinyosophon	Thailand	57.58	Q
4	H1 L4	Amanda Lim	Singapore	57.96	Q
5	H2 L6	Chui Lai Kwan	Malaysia	58.25	Q
5	H1 L6	Jasmine Paler Alkhaldi	Philippines	58.25	Q
7	H1 L5	Leung Chii Lin	Malaysia	58.75	Q
8	H1 L3	Enny Susilowati Margono	Indonesia	59.50	Q
9	H1 L2	Heidi Gem Chua Ong	Philippines	59.79	
10	H2 L2	Tran Tam Nguyen	Vietnam	1:00.02	
11	H2 L1	Nguyen Thi Ngoc Yen	Vietnam	1:00.51	
12	H2 L7	Ressa Kania Dewi	Indonesia	1:01.39	
13	H1 L7	Hemthon Vitiny	Cambodia	1:08.71	
14	H1 L1	Thepaksone Chindavong	Laos	1:14.64	
15	H1 L8	Napha Xinsaivolavong	Laos	1:22.18	
