= Swimming at the 2009 SEA Games – Men's 100 metre freestyle =

Swimming – Men's 100 metre freestyle at the 2009 SEA Games
- Date: 11 December 2009
- Winning time: 50.16 GR

Medalists
gold medal	Daniel Bego	Malaysia
silver medal	Charles Walker	Philippines
bronze medal	Russell Ong	Singapore

The Men's 100 Freestyle swimming event at the 2009 SEA Games was held on December 11, 2009. Daniel Bego of Malaysia won the event.

== Results ==
=== Final ===
Place	Swimmer	Nation	Time	Notes
1st place, gold medalist(s)	Daniel Bego	Malaysia	50.16	GR
2nd place, silver medalist(s)	Charles Walker	Philippines	50.96	NR
3rd place, bronze medalist(s)	Russell Ong	Singapore	51.05	
4	Foo Jian Beng	Malaysia	51.22	
5	Traiady Fauzi	Indonesia	51.24	
6	Guntur Pratama	Indonesia	51.29	
7	Daniel Coakley	Philippines	51.45	
8	Thanyanant P.	Thailand	52.73	

=== Preliminary heats ===
Rank	Heat	Swimmer	Nation	Time	Notes
1	H2	Daniel Bego	Malaysia	51.63	Q
2	H2	Daniel Coakley	Philippines	51.63	Q
3	H2	Traiady Fauzi	Indonesia	51.75	Q
4	H1	Guntur Pratama	Indonesia	51.75	Q
5	H1	Russell Ong	Singapore	51.93	Q
6	H1	Charles Walker	Philippines	52.30	Q
7	H2	Foo Jian Beng	Malaysia	54.33	Q
8	H1	Thanyanant P	Thailand	52.61	Q
9	H1	Thanh Hai Nguyen	Vietnam	53.25	
10	H2	Quy Phuoc Hoang	Vietnam	1:04.36	
11	H2	S Soulasane	Laos	1:04.36	
12	H2	Sao Sedarath	Cambodia	1:05.61	
13	H1	S Saylom	Laos	1:07.70	
