= Swimming at the 2009 SEA Games – Men's 200 metre backstroke =

Swimming – Men's 200 metre backstroke at the 2009 SEA Games
- Date: 10 December 2009
- Winning time: 2:03.27

Medalists
gold medal	Zach Ong	Singapore
silver medal	Ryan Arabejo	Philippines
bronze medal	Rainer Ng	Singapore

The Men's 200 Backstroke swimming event at the 2009 SEA Games was held on December 10, 2009. Zach Ong from Singapore won the event.

== Results ==
=== Final ===
Place	Swimmer	Nation	Time	Notes
1st place, gold medalist(s)	Zach Ong	Singapore	2:03.27	
2nd place, silver medalist(s)	Ryan Arabejo	Philippines	2:04.36	
3rd place, bronze medalist(s)	Rainer Ng	Singapore	2:06.10	
4	Puttiping H	Thailand	2:06.92	
5	Huy Long Do	Vietnam	2:07.15	
6	Glenn Victor	Indonesia	2:08.81	
7	Ian James Barr	Malaysia	2:11.06	
8	Nithipanya A	Thailand	2:25.94	

=== Preliminary heats ===
Rank	Heat	Swimmer	Nation	Time	Notes
1	H2	Ryan Arabejo	Philippines	2:09.86	Q
2	H2	Zach Ong	Singapore	2:10.28	Q
3	H1	Glenn Victor	Indonesia	2:10.45	Q
4	H1	Rainer Ng	Singapore	2:12.27	Q
5	H2	Puttiping H	Thailand	2:13.45	Q
6	H2	Huy Long Do	Vietnam	2:14.80	Q
7	H1	Ian James Barr	Malaysia	2:15.15	Q
8	H1	Jessie Lacuna	Philippines	2:19.05	scratched finals
9	H2	Nithipanya A	Thailand	2:26.29	
10	H2	Maximov Chamraen Y	Cambodia	2:48.63	
11	H1	P Pathana	Laos	3:07.24	
