= Swimming at the 2009 SEA Games – Women's 200 metre freestyle =

Swimming – Women's 200 metre freestyle at the 2009 SEA Games
- Date: 10 December 2009
- Winning time: 2:00.57 GR

Medalists
gold medal	Quah Ting Wen	Singapore
silver medal	Natthanan Junkrajang	Thailand
bronze medal	Rutai Santadvatana	Thailand

The Women's 200 Freestyle swimming event at the 25th SEA Games was held on December 13, 2009.

== Results ==
=== Final ===
Place	Lane	Swimmer	Nation	Time	Notes
1st place, gold medalist(s)	4	Quah Ting Wen	Singapore	2:00.57	GR
2nd place, silver medalist(s)	5	Natthanan Junkrajang	Thailand	2:01.65	
3rd place, bronze medalist(s)	6	Rutai Santadvatana	Thailand	2:03.90	
4	3	Erica Totten	Philippines	2:03.97	
5	7	Amanda Lim	Singapore	2:04.09	
6	8	Wei Li Lai	Malaysia	2:06.36	
7	2	Heidi Gan	Malaysia	2:07.79	
8	1	Tam Nguyen Tran	Vietnam	2:08.51	

=== Preliminary heats ===
Rank	Heat/Lane	Swimmer	Nation	Time	Notes
1	H2 L4	Quah Ting Wen	Singapore	2:05.90	Q
2	H1 L4	Natthanan Junkrajang	Thailand	2:07.48	Q
3	H1 L3	Erica Totten	Philippines	2:08.20	Q
4	H1 L5	Rutai Santadvatana	Thailand	2:08.26	Q
5	H2 L3	Heidi Gan	Malaysia	2:08.36	Q
6	H2 L5	Amanda Lim	Singapore	2:09.12	Q
7	H1 L2	Tam Nguyen Tran	Vietnam	2:09.19	Q
8	H2 L6	Wei Li Lai	Malaysia	2:09.33	Q
9	H2 L2	Fibriani R Marita	Indonesia	2:11.97	
10	H1 L6	Enny Susilowati M	Indonesia	2:12.57	
