= Swimming at the 2009 SEA Games – Women's 50 metre freestyle =

Swimming – Women's 50 metre freestyle at the 2009 SEA Games
- Date: 14 December 2009
- Winning time: 25.82 GR

Medalists
gold medal	Amanda Lim	Singapore
silver medal	Quah Ting Wen	Singapore
bronze medal	Chui Lai Kwan	Malaysia

The Women's 50 Freestyle swimming event at the 25th SEA Games was held on December 14, 2009.

The Games Record at the start of the event was: 26.13 by Singapore's Joscelin Yeo at the 2005 Games (December 3). Amanda Lim (Lim Xiang Qi) from Singapore won the event.

== Results ==
=== Final ===
Place	Swimmer	Nation	Time	Notes
1st place, gold medalist(s)	Amanda Lim	Singapore	25.82	GR
2nd place, silver medalist(s)	QUAH Ting Wen	Singapore	25.88	
3rd place, bronze medalist(s)	Chui Lai Kwan	Malaysia	26.22	
4	Natthanan J.	Thailand	26.29	
5	Jasmine Al-Khaldi	Philippines	26.56	
6	Chii Lin Leung	Malaysia	26.62	
7	Natsaya Susuk	Thailand	26.74	
8	Heidi Ong	Philippines	27.01	

=== Preliminary heats ===
Rank	Swimmer	Nation	Time	Notes
1	Chui Lai Kwan	Malaysia	26.22	
2	Amanda Lim	Singapore	26.27	
3	QUAH Ting Wen	Singapore	26.28	
4	Natthanan J.	Thailand	26.64	
5	Jasmine Alkhaldi	Philippines	26.66	
6	Chii Lin Leung	Malaysia	27.15	
7	Natsaya Susuk	Thailand	27.25	
8	Heidi Ong	Philippines	27.45	
9	Enny Susilowati	Indonesia	27.56	
10	Tam Nguyen Tran	Vietnam	27.92	
11	Ressa Ressa	Indonesia	28.89	
12	Hem Thon Vitiny	Cambodia	31.35	
13	T. Thepaksone	Laos	32.20	
14	Seng Sam Phors	Cambodia	32.63	
15	V. Veomany	Laos	33.95	
