= Swimming at the 2009 SEA Games – Men's 100 metre butterfly =

Swimming – Men's 100 metre butterfly at the 2009 SEA Games
- Date: 11 December 2009
- Winning time: 53.82 GR

Medalists
gold medal	Daniel Bego	Malaysia
silver medal	Donny Utomo	Indonesia
bronze medal	Quy Phuoc Hoang	Vietnam

The Men's 100 Butterfly swimming event at the 2009 SEA Games was held on December 11, 2009. Daniel Bego of Malaysia won the event.

== Results ==
=== Final ===
Place	Swimmer	Nation	Time	Notes
1st place, gold medalist(s)	Daniel Bego	Malaysia	53.82	GR
2nd place, silver medalist(s)	Donny Utomo	Indonesia	55.53	
3rd place, bronze medalist(s)	Quy Phuoc Hoang	Vietnam	55.65	
4	Thai Nguyen Vo	Vietnam	55.77	
5	James Walsh	Philippines	56.16	
6	Chatmongkon N	Thailand	56.21	
7	Kevin Lim	Malaysia	56.87	
8	Jessie Lacuna	Philippines	59.43	

=== Preliminary heats ===
Rank	Heat	Swimmer	Nation	Time	Notes
1	H2	Chatmongkon N	Thailand	55.87	Q
2	H2	James Walsh	Philippines	56.63	Q
3	H1	Donny Utomo	Indonesia	56.74	Q
4	H1	Thai Nguyen Vo	Vietnam	56.76	Q
5	H2	Daniel Bego	Malaysia	57.04	Q
6	H2	Quy Phuoc Hoang	Vietnam	57.66	Q
7	H1	Kevin Lim	Malaysia	58.52	Q
8	H2	Jessie Lacuna	Philippines	58.87	Q
9	H1	Zaw Phyo Aung	Myanmar	1:03.26	
10	H1	Glenn Victor	Indonesia	1:09.41	
11	H2	Kun Narak	Cambodia	1:12.88	
12	H1	T Thepphitack	Laos	1:23.08	
