= Swimming at the 2009 SEA Games – Men's 400 metre freestyle =

Swimming – Men's 400 metre freestyle at the 2009 SEA Games
- Date: 12 December 2009
- Winning time: 3:53.99 GR

Medalists
gold medal	Daniel Bego	Malaysia
silver medal	Ryan Arabejo	Philippines
bronze medal	Sanit Tiewong	Thailand

The Men's 400 Freestyle swimming event at the 2009 SEA Games was held on December 12, 2009. Daniel Bego from Malaysia won the event.

== Results ==
=== Final ===
Place	Swimmer	Nation	Time	Notes
1st place, gold medalist(s)	Daniel Bego	Malaysia	3:53.99	GR
2nd place, silver medalist(s)	Ryan Arabejo	Philippines	3:56.06	
3rd place, bronze medalist(s)	Sanit Tiewong	Thailand	3:57.79	
4	Marcus Cheah	Singapore	3:59.44	
5	Kevin Yeap	Malaysia	4:01.36	
6	Akbar Nasution	Indonesia	4:05.32	
7	Triady Fauzi	Indonesia	4:07.99	
8	Jessie Lacuna	Philippines	4:08.90	

=== Preliminary heats ===
Rank	Heat	Swimmer	Nation	Time	Notes
1	H1	Ryan Arabejo	Philippines	4:05.73	Q
2	H1	Kevin Yeap	Malaysia	4:06.71	Q
3	H1	Akbar Nasution	Indonesia	4:07.74	Q
4	H2	Marcus Cheah	Singapore	4:07.90	Q
5	H2	Daniel Bego	Malaysia	4:07.98	Q
6	H2	Sanit Tiewong	Thailand	4:08.91	Q
7	H2	Triady Fauzi	Indonesia	4:10.10	Q
8	H2	Jessie Lacuna	Philippines	4:10.30	Q
9	H1	Nithipanya A.	Thailand	4:14.08	
10	H1	Danny Yeo	Singapore	4:34.77	
11	H1	Maximov Chamraen Y	Cambodia	5:02.66	
12	H2	Hem Thonponloeu	Cambodia	5:06.42	
13	H2	M. Mitpaserth	Laos	6:19.09	
14	H1	S. Sergey	Laos	6:23.57	
