= Swimming at the 2009 SEA Games – Men's 100 metre backstroke =

Swimming – Men's 100 metre backstroke at the 2009 SEA Games
- Date: 12 December 2009
- Winning time: 56.42

Medalists
gold medal	Glenn Sutanto	Indonesia
silver medal	Rainer Ng	Singapore
bronze medal	Zach Ong	Singapore

The Men's 100 Backstroke swimming event at the 2009 SEA Games was held on December 12, 2009. Glenn Sutanto of Indonesia won the event.

== Results ==
=== Final ===
Place	Swimmer	Nation	Time	Notes
1st place, gold medalist(s)	Glenn Sutanto	Indonesia	56.42	
2nd place, silver medalist(s)	Rainer Ng	Singapore	56.73	
3rd place, bronze medalist(s)	Zach Ong	Singapore	56.89	
4	Charles Walker	Philippines	57.43	
5	Guntur Pratama	Indonesia	57.58	
6	Huy Long Do	Vietnam	58.07	
7	Ian James Barr	Malaysia	58.28	
8	Puttiping H.	Thailand	59.09	

=== Preliminary heats ===
Rank	Heat	Swimmer	Nation	Time	Notes
1	H1	Charles Walker	Philippines	59.31	Q
2	H2	Ian James Barr	Malaysia	59.51	Q
3	H2	Rainer Ng	Singapore	59.72	Q
4	H2	Puttiping H.	Thailand	1:00.27	Q
5	H1	Glenn Sutanto	Indonesia	1:00.50	Q
6	H2	Zach Ong	Singapore	1:00.55	Q
7	H2	Guntur Pratama	Indonesia	1:00.76	Q
8	H2	Huy Long Do	Vietnam	1:01.18	Q
9	H1	Melvin Chua	Malaysia	1:01.82	
10	H1	Radomyos Matjiur	Thailand	1:03.01	
11	H1	Ryan Arabejo	Philippines	1:07.14	
12	H1	N. Nilaphon	Laos	1:18.49	
13	H2	S. Saylom	Laos	1:21.59	
