= Swimming at the 2009 SEA Games – Men's 200 metre freestyle =

Swimming – Men's 200 metre freestyle at the 2009 SEA Games
- Date: 14 December 2009
- Winning time: 1:49.22 GR

Medalists
gold medal	Daniel Bego	Malaysia
silver medal	Miguel Molina	Philippines
bronze medal	Joshua Lim	Singapore

The Men's 200 Freestyle swimming event at the 2009 SEA Games was held on December 14, 2009. Daniel Bego from Malaysia won the event.

== Results ==
=== Final ===
Place	Swimmer	Nation	Time	Notes
1	Daniel Bego	Malaysia	1:49.22	GR
2	Miguel Molina	Philippines	1:51.71	
3	Joshua Lim	Singapore	1:51.76	
4	Sanit Tiewong	Thailand	1:51.88	NR
5	Jessie Lacuna	Philippines	1:52.22	
6	Triady Fauzi	Indonesia	1:52.42	
7	Kevin Yeap	Malaysia	1:54.49	
8	Thanh Hai Nguyen	Vietnam	1:54.85	

=== Preliminary heats ===
Rank	Swimmer	Nation	Time	Notes
1	Triady Fauzi	Indonesia	1:54.01	Q
2	Jessie Lacuna	Philippines	1:55.15	Q
3	Daniel Bego	Malaysia	1:56.74	Q
4	Joshua Lim	Singapore	1:57.30	Q
5	Thanh Hai Nguyen	Vietnam	1:57.59	Q
6	Miguel Molina	Philippines	1:59.20	Q
7	Sanit Tiewong	Thailand	1:59.30	Q
8	Kevin Yeap	Malaysia	1:59.56	Q
9	Marcus Cheah	Singapore	1:59.59	
10	Tharnawat T.	Thailand	2:15.80	
11	Hem Thonponloeu	Cambodia	2:21.17	
12	Maximov Chamraen	Cambodia	2:23.13	
13	S. Soukshathaphone	Laos	2:28.35	
14	M. Mitpaseth	Laos	3:04.38	
