= Swimming at the 2009 SEA Games – Men's 200 metre butterfly =

Swimming – Men's 200 metre butterfly at the 2009 SEA Games
- Date: 14 December 2009
- Winning time: 2:00.61

Medalists
gold medal	Daniel Bego	Malaysia
silver medal	Donny Utomo	Indonesia
bronze medal	Võ Thái Nguyên	Vietnam

The Men's 200 Butterfly swimming event at the 2009 SEA Games was held on December 14, 2009. Daniel Bego from Malaysia won the event.

== Results ==
=== Final ===
Place	Swimmer	Nation	Time	Notes
1st place, gold medalist(s)	Daniel Bego	Malaysia	2:00.61	
2nd place, silver medalist(s)	Donny Utomo	Indonesia	2:00.90	
3rd place, bronze medalist(s)	Võ Thái Nguyên	Vietnam	2:01.34	
4	James Walsh	Philippines	2:02.86	
5	Arkom Anuchat-o-Larn	Thailand	2:03.34	
6	Wei Ming Ho	Singapore	2:05.76	
7	Kevin Lim	Malaysia	2:06.07	
8	Robert Walsh	Philippines	2:09.35	

=== Preliminary heats ===
Rank	Heat	Swimmer	Nation	Time	Notes
1	H2	Rainer Ng	Singapore	2:03.14	scratched finals
2	H2	Donny Utomo	Indonesia	2:04.91	Q
3	H2	Daniel Bego	Malaysia	2:05.17	Q
4	H1	Võ Thái Nguyên	Vietnam	2:06.50	Q
5	H1	James Walsh	Singapore	2:06.54	Q
6	H1	Arkom Anuchat-o-Larn	Thailand	2:06.68	Q
7	H2	Kevin Lim	Malaysia	2:08.25	Q
8	H1	Robert Walsh	Philippines	2:08.69	Q
9	H2	Wei Ming Ho	Singapore	2:10.58	
