= Swimming at the 2009 SEA Games – Men's 100 metre breaststroke =

Swimming – Men's 100 metre breaststroke at the 2009 SEA Games
- Date: 11 December 2009
- Winning time: 1:01.60 GR

Medalists
gold medal	Nguyễn Hữu Việt	Vietnam
silver medal	Indra Gunawan	Indonesia
bronze medal	Vorrawuti Aumpiwan	Thailand

The Men's 100 Breaststroke swimming event at the 2009 SEA Games was held on December 11, 2009. Nguyễn Hữu Việt of Vietnam won the event.

== Results ==
=== Final ===
Place	Swimmer	Nation	Time	Notes
1st place, gold medalist(s)	Nguyễn Hữu Việt	Vietnam	1:01.60	GR
2nd place, silver medalist(s)	Indra Gunawan	Indonesia	1:01.92	
3rd place, bronze medalist(s)	Vorrawuti Aumpiwan	Thailand	1:02.60	
4	Jia Hao Ng	Singapore	1:04.14	
5	Nicko Biondi	Indonesia	1:04.51	
6	Yap See Tuan	Malaysia	1:04.94	
7	Mark Tan	Singapore	1:04.96	
8	Nuttapong Ketin	Thailand	1:05.16	

=== Preliminary heats ===
Rank	Heat	Swimmer	Nation	Time	Notes
1	H1	Indra Gunawan	Indonesia	1:02.59	Q, GR
2	H2	Nguyễn Hữu Việt	Vietnam	1:03.77	Q
3	H1	Jia Hao Ng	Singapore	1:04.48	Q
4	H1	Vorrawuti Aumpiwan	Thailand	1:04.57	Q
5	H2	Nicko Biondi	Indonesia	1:04.96	Q
6	H2	Yap See Tuan	Malaysia	1:05.16	Q
7	H1	Mark Tan	Singapore	1:05.32	Q
8	H2	Nuttapong Ketin	Thailand	1:05.86	Q
9	H1	Banjo Borja	Philippines	1:08.26	
10	H2	Hem Thonponloeu	Cambodia	1:13.96	
11	H1	A Anulack	Laos	1:19.39	
12	H2	N Nilaphon	Laos	1:20.63	
13	H1	Kun Narak	Cambodia	1:22.84	
