= Karate at the 2009 SEA Games =

Karate at the SEA Games

Karate at the 2009 SEA Games was held at Chao Anouvong Gymnasium from 10 to 12 December 2009 in Vientiane, Laos.

== Medal summary ==
* Host nation (Laos)

Rank	Nation	Gold	Silver	Bronze	Total
1	Vietnam	6	4	1	11
2	Malaysia	5	6	2	13
3	Indonesia	3	3	6	12
4	Laos*	2	0	7	9
5	Philippines	1	2	3	6
6	Myanmar	0	1	2	3
7	Singapore	0	1	1	2
8	Thailand	0	0	7	7
9	Brunei	0	0	4	4
10	Timor-Leste	0	0	1	1
Totals (10 entries)		17	17	34	68

== Medalists ==
=== Kata ===
Event	Gold	Silver	Bronze
Men's individual	Faizal Zainuddin; Indonesia	Tan Chee Sheng; Malaysia	Inthanousone Vilaysouk; Laos
Men's individual	Faizal Zainuddin; Indonesia	Tan Chee Sheng; Malaysia	Noel Espinosa; Philippines
Men's team	Indonesia; Faizal Zainuddin; Fidelys Lolobua; Aswar	Malaysia; Tan Chee Sheng; Leong Tze Wai; Kam Kah Sam	Myanmar; Than Htike; Kyaw Kyaw Tun; Aung Khant
Men's team	Indonesia; Faizal Zainuddin; Fidelys Lolobua; Aswar	Malaysia; Tan Chee Sheng; Leong Tze Wai; Kam Kah Sam	Vietnam; Nguyễn Thanh Long; Thạch Văn Thành; Tô Hải Nam
Women's individual	Nguyễn Hoàng Ngân; Vietnam	Ng Pei Yi; Singapore	Yanisa Torrattanawathana; Thailand
Women's individual	Nguyễn Hoàng Ngân; Vietnam	Ng Pei Yi; Singapore	Lim Lee Lee; Malaysia
Women's team	Vietnam; Nguyễn Hoàng Ngân; Đỗ Thị Thu Hà; Nguyễn Thị Hằng	Malaysia; Lim Lee Lee; Thoe Ai Poh; Chong Chew Teng	Indonesia; Dewi Yulianti; Yuli Eka Yanti; Alit Tresna
Women's team	Vietnam; Nguyễn Hoàng Ngân; Đỗ Thị Thu Hà; Nguyễn Thị Hằng	Malaysia; Lim Lee Lee; Thoe Ai Poh; Chong Chew Teng	Laos; Thaviphone; Orlaphan; Chanthamaly

=== Kumite ===
==== Men ====
Event	Gold	Silver	Bronze
55 kg	Puvaneswaran Ramasamy; Malaysia	Phạm Hoài Long; Vietnam	Ace Pediongo Eso; Philippines
55 kg	Puvaneswaran Ramasamy; Malaysia	Phạm Hoài Long; Vietnam	Hirannithishatphol Saratham; Thailand
60 kg	Xaysavath Oupalavanh; Laos	Kunasilan Lakanathan; Malaysia	Donny Dharmawan; Indonesia
60 kg	Xaysavath Oupalavanh; Laos	Kunasilan Lakanathan; Malaysia	Aung Pyae; Myanmar
67 kg	Nguyễn Ngọc Thanh; Vietnam	Jintar Simanjuntak; Indonesia	Fadilah Sanif; Brunei
67 kg	Nguyễn Ngọc Thanh; Vietnam	Jintar Simanjuntak; Indonesia	Tay Qing Yuan; Singapore
75 kg	Inkathep; Laos	Rolando Lagman; Philippines	Shaharudin; Malaysia
75 kg	Inkathep; Laos	Rolando Lagman; Philippines	Yuttana Klamprabud; Thailand
84 kg	Mohd Hatta; Malaysia	Hendro Salim; Indonesia	Mainudin Mohamad; Brunei
84 kg	Mohd Hatta; Malaysia	Hendro Salim; Indonesia	Soukphansa; Laos
+84 kg	Umar Syarief; Indonesia	Phạm Quang Duy; Vietnam	Sengpheng; Laos
+84 kg	Umar Syarief; Indonesia	Phạm Quang Duy; Vietnam	Jamil Hj Abd Majid; Brunei
Team	Vietnam (VIE); Nguyễn Ngọc Thanh; Phạm Hoài Long; Nguyễn Hoàng Hiệp; Nguyễn Minh Phụng; Dương Hoàng Long	Malaysia (MAS)	Indonesia (INA)
Team	Vietnam (VIE); Nguyễn Ngọc Thanh; Phạm Hoài Long; Nguyễn Hoàng Hiệp; Nguyễn Minh Phụng; Dương Hoàng Long	Malaysia (MAS)	Philippines (PHI)

==== Women ====
Event	Gold	Silver	Bronze
50 kg	Vu Thi Nguyet Anh; Vietnam	Martinel Prihastut; Indonesia	Masdianah Hj Tengah; Brunei
50 kg	Vu Thi Nguyet Anh; Vietnam	Martinel Prihastut; Indonesia	Chansouda; Laos
55 kg	Marna Pabillore; Philippines	Nguyen Thi Hai Yen; Vietnam	Nur Hadiyanti; Indonesia
55 kg	Marna Pabillore; Philippines	Nguyen Thi Hai Yen; Vietnam	Yanisa Torrattanawathana; Thailand
61 kg	Bui Thi Trieu; Vietnam	Vathana; Malaysia	Puspita Triana; Indonesia
61 kg	Bui Thi Trieu; Vietnam	Vathana; Malaysia	Soarescorreia; Timor-Leste
68 kg	Yamini; Malaysia	Ni Ni Cho The; Myanmar	Nongkhan; Laos
68 kg	Yamini; Malaysia	Ni Ni Cho The; Myanmar	Piyanan Ratbandit; Thailand
>68 kg	Jamalliah; Malaysia	Lutche Metante; Philippines	Sengdaly; Laos
>68 kg	Jamalliah; Malaysia	Lutche Metante; Philippines	Surapee Intarajang; Thailand
Team	Malaysia (MAS)	Vietnam (VIE)	Indonesia (INA)
Team	Malaysia (MAS)	Vietnam (VIE)	Thailand (THA)
