= Swimming at the 2009 SEA Games – Women's 200 metre butterfly =

The Women's 200 Butterfly swimming event at the 2009 SEA Games was held in December 2009.

The Games Record at the start of the event was 2:14.11 by Singapore's TAO Li swum at the 2005 SEA Games (on December 3, 2005).

== Results ==
=== Final ===
Place	Swimmer	Nation	Time	Notes
1	Tao Li	Singapore	2:13.49	GR
2	Cai Lin Khoo	Malaysia	2:14.30	
3	Kittiya Patarawadee	Thailand	2:14.64	
4	Erica Totten	Philippines	2:15.76	
5	T Kim Tuyen Nguyen	Vietnam	2:16.33	
6	Hii Siew Siew	Malaysia	2:18.65	
7	Raina Saumi	Indonesia	2:21.05	
8	Koh Ting Ting	Singapore	2:23.92	

=== Preliminary heats ===
Rank	Swimmer	Nation	Time	Notes
1	Erica Totten	Philippines	2:19.61	
2	Hii Siew Siew	Malaysia	2:19.70	
3	T Kim Tuyen Nguyen	Vietnam	2:20.41	
4	Kittiya Patarawadee	Thailand	2:20.92	
5	Tao Li	Singapore	2:21.36	
6	Raina Saumi	Indonesia	2:21.58	
7	Cai Lin Khoo	Malaysia	2:22.09	
8	Koh Ting Ting	Singapore	2:24.69	
9	Maria Gandionco	Singapore	2:25.41	
10	Natnapa P.	Thailand	2:41.09	
