= Swimming at the 2009 SEA Games – Women's 200 metre backstroke =

Swimming – Women's 200 metre backstroke at the 2009 SEA Games
- Date: 10 December 2009
- Winning time: 2:17.12

Medalists
gold medal	Tao Li	Singapore
silver medal	Chavisa Thaveesupsoonthorn	Thailand
bronze medal	Shana Lim	Singapore

The Women's 200 Backstroke swimming event at the 25th SEA Games was held on December 10, 2009.

== Results ==
=== Final ===
Place	Lane	Swimmer	Nation	Time	Notes
1st place, gold medalist(s)	6	Tao Li	Singapore	2:17.12	
2nd place, silver medalist(s)	4	Chavisa Thaveesupsoonthorn	Thailand	2:19.87	
3rd place, bronze medalist(s)	5	Shana Lim	Singapore	2:20.98	
4	3	Tiffani Sudharma	Indonesia	2:23.25	
5	7	Dorothy Hong	Philippines	2:26.58	
6	1	Thi Thom Duong	Vietnam	2:27.68	
7	2	Navarat Thongkaew	Thailand	2:27.69	
8	8	Kah Yan Chan	Malaysia	2:32.72	

=== Preliminary heats ===
Rank	Heat/Lane	Swimmer	Nation	Time	Notes
1	H1 L5	Chavisa Thaveesupsoonthorn	Thailand	2:20.82	Q
2	H1 L4	Shana Lim	Singapore	2:21.97	Q
3	H1 L3	Tiffani Sudharma	Indonesia	2:25.20	Q
4	H2 L4	Tao Li	Singapore	2:26.12	Q
5	H2 L6	Navarat Thongkaew	Thailand	2:26.73	Q
6	H2 L2	Dorothy Hong	Philippines	2:26.78	Q
7	H1 L6	Thi Thom Duong	Vietnam	2:27.15	Q
8	H1 L2	Kah Yan Chan	Malaysia	2:28.71	Q
9	H2 L3	T Kim Tuyen Nguyen	Vietnam	2:28.91	
10	H2 L5	Karmen Cheng	Malaysia	2:34.52	
11	H1 L7	D Doheuang	Laos	3:03.60	
