= Swimming at the 2009 SEA Games – Men's 1500 metre freestyle =

Swimming – Men's 1500 metre freestyle at the 2009 SEA Games
- Date: 13 December 2009
- Winning time: 15:37.75 GR

Medalists
gold medal	Ryan Arabejo	Philippines
silver medal	Kevin Yeap	Malaysia
bronze medal	Punyawee Sontana	Thailand

The Men's 1500 Freestyle swimming event at the 2009 SEA Games was held on December 13, 2009. It was a timed-final event. Ryan Arabejo from the Philippines won the event.

== Results ==
=== Final ===
Place	Swimmer	Nation	Time	Notes
1st place, gold medalist(s)	Ryan Arabejo	Philippines	15:37.75	GR
2nd place, silver medalist(s)	Kevin Yeap	Malaysia	15:51.80	
3rd place, bronze medalist(s)	Punyawee Sontana	Thailand	16:02.21	
4	Kevin Lim	Malaysia	16:09.09	
5	Jose Gonzales	Philippines	16:49.75	
6	Maximov Chamraen	Cambodia	19:29.16	
