= Shooting at the 2009 SEA Games =

Shooting was contested at the 2009 SEA Games in Vientiane, Laos from December 10 to December 18. Men's and women's competition were held in Air Pistol, Air Rifle, Running Target, Pistol, Prone, Skeet, and Trap. All competition took place at Shooting Range, National Sports Complex.

== Medal summary ==
* Host nation (Laos)

Rank	Nation	Gold	Silver	Bronze	Total
1	Vietnam (VIE)	11	12	8	31
2	Thailand (THA)	10	8	12	30
3	Singapore (SIN)	6	5	5	16
4	Laos (LAO)*	3	1	1	5
5	Myanmar (MYA)	2	1	0	3
6	Indonesia (INA)	1	1	3	5
7	Philippines (PHI)	1	0	0	1
8	Malaysia (MAS)	0	6	5	11
Totals (8 entries)		34	34	34	102

== Medalists ==
=== Men ===
Event	Gold	Silver	Bronze
10 m air pistol	Hoàng Xuân Vinh; Vietnam	Poh Lip Meng; Singapore	Adisak Saleenosak; Thailand
10 m air pistol team	Singapore; Gai Bin; Nigel Lim; Poh Lip Meng	Vietnam; Hoàng Xuân Vinh; Nguyễn Mạnh Tường; Trần Quốc Cường	Thailand; Adisak Saleenosak; Kanitpong Gongkum; Noppadon Sutiviruch
25 m center fire pistol	Nguyễn Mạnh Tường; Vietnam	Phạm Cao Sơn; Vietnam	Prakarn Karndee; Thailand
25 m center fire pistol team	Vietnam; Hoàng Xuân Vinh; Nguyễn Mạnh Tường; Phạm Cao Sơn	Thailand; Opas Ruengpanyawut; Prakarn Karndee; Pruet Sriyaphan	Singapore; Gai Bin; On Shaw Ming; Poh Lip Meng
25 m rapid fire pistol	Nathaniel Padilla; Philippines	Hasli Izwan; Malaysia	Phạm Cao Sơn; Vietnam
25 m rapid fire pistol team	Vietnam; Hà Minh Thành; Phạm Anh Đạt; Phạm Cao Sơn	Malaysia; Hafiz Salih; Hasli Izwan; Khalel Abdullah	Thailand; Pongpol Kulchairattana; Pruet Sriyaphan; Vorapol Kulchairattana
25 m standard pistol	Prakarn Karndee; Thailand	Gai Bin; Singapore	Phạm Cao Sơn; Vietnam
25 m standard pistol team	Thailand; Prakarn Karndee; Pongpol Kulchairattana	Vietnam; Nguyễn Mạnh Tường; Phạm Anh Đạt; Phạm Cao Sơn	Singapore; Gai Bin; On Shaw Ming; Poh Lip Meng
50 m pistol	Pongpol Kulchairattana; Thailand	Gai Bin; Singapore	Nguyễn Mạnh Tường; Vietnam
50 m pistol team	Singapore; Poh Lip Meng; Gai Bin; Nigel Lim	Vietnam	Thailand
10 m air rifle	Zhang Jin; Singapore	Jonathan Koh; Singapore	Varavut Majchacheep; Thailand
10 m air rifle team	Singapore; Zhang Jin; Jonathan Koh; Ong Jun Hong	Thailand; Pongsakorn Kaewja; Thanaphat Thananchai; Varavut Majchacheep	Vietnam; Phạm Ngọc Thanh; Nguyễn Duy Hoàng; Trần Văn Thảo
50 m rifle prone	Linn Aung; Myanmar	Aung Nyein Ni; Myanmar	Phạm Ngọc Thanh; Vietnam
50 m rifle prone team	Myanmar; Aung Nyein Ni; Aung Thuya; Linn Aung	Vietnam; Nguyễn Duy Hoàng; Phạm Ngọc Thanh; Vũ Thành Hưng	Singapore; Kasmijan Kimin; Ong Jun Hong; Zhang Jin
50 m rifle 3 position	Phạm Ngọc Thanh; Vietnam	Vũ Thành Hưng; Vietnam	Tevarit Majchacheep; Thailand
50 m rifle 3 position team	Vietnam; Nguyễn Duy Hoàng; Phạm Ngọc Thanh; Vũ Thành Hưng	Malaysia; Mohd Hadafi; Mohd Nurrahimin; Muhamad Zubair	Thailand; Komkrit Kongnamchok; Tevarit Majchacheep; Varavut Majchacheep
10 m running target	Ngô Hữu Vượng; Vietnam	Nguyễn Văn Tùng; Vietnam	Yoshie Augusta Akbar; Indonesia^{1}
10 m running target team	Vietnam; Đỗ Đức Hùng; Ngô Hữu Vượng; Nguyễn Văn Tùng	Thailand; Mongkonchai Meechu; Saramon Jareangchit; Witsanu Klomjai	Indonesia; Gunawan; Masruri; Yoshie Augusta Akbar
10 m running target mixed	Ngô Hữu Vượng; Vietnam	Nguyễn Văn Tùng; Vietnam	Witsanu Klomjai; Thailand
10 m running target mixed team	Vietnam; Đỗ Đức Hùng; Ngô Hữu Vượng; Nguyễn Văn Tùng	Thailand; Mongkonchai Meechu; Saramon Jareangchit; Witsanu Klomjai	Indonesia; Gunawan; Masruri; Yoshie Augusta Akbar

Note:
1. Đỗ Đức Hùng of Vietnam finished in third place, however, the bronze medal was awarded to Yoshie Augusta of Indonesia as no country is allowed to win all three medals on offer.

=== Women ===
Event	Gold	Silver	Bronze
10 m air pistol	Tanyaporn Prucksakorn; Thailand	Bibiana Ng; Malaysia	Wanwarin Yusawat; Thailand
10 m air pistol team	Thailand; Nerissa Yoksuwan; Tanyaporn Prucksakorn; Wanwarin Yusawat	Vietnam; Bùi Thị Thuý Hạnh; Đặng Lê Ngọc Mai; Phạm Thị Hà	Malaysia; Bibiana Ng; Joseline Cheah; Masitah
25 m pistol	Tanyaporn Prucksakorn; Thailand	Bibiana Ng; Malaysia	Phạm Thị Hà; Vietnam
25 m pistol team	Thailand; Nerissa Yoksuwan; Piyathip Ruengpanyawut; Tanyaporn Prucksakorn	Vietnam; Bùi Thị Thuý Hạnh; Đặng Lê Ngọc Mai; Phạm Thị Hà	Malaysia; Bibiana Ng; Joseline Cheah; Masitah
10 m air rifle	Goh Jia Yi; Singapore	Thanyalak Chotphibunsin; Thailand	Nur Ayuni Farhana; Malaysia
10 m air rifle team	Thailand; Thanyalak Chotphibunsin; Sirijit Khongnil; Sasithorn Hongprasert	Malaysia; Shahera Rahim Raja; Nur Ayuni Farhana Halim; Nur Suryani Taibi	Singapore; Goh Jia Yi; Haw Siew Peng; Aqilah Sudhir
50 m rifle prone	Erlinawati Chalid; Indonesia	Vitchuda Pichitkanjanakul; Thailand	Đàm Thị Nga; Vietnam
50 m rifle prone team	Thailand; Sununta Majchacheep; Thanyalak Chotphibunsin; Vitchuda Pichitkanjanakul	Indonesia; Erlinawati Chalid; Maharani Ardy; Rachma Saraswati	Malaysia; Muslifah Zulkifli; Nor Ain Ibrahim; Nur Suryani Taibi
50 m rifle 3 position	Jasmine Ser; Singapore	Sununta Majchacheep; Thailand	Aqilah Sudhir; Singapore
50 m rifle 3 position team	Thailand; Sasithorn Hongprasert; Sirijit Khongnil; Sununta Majchacheep	Singapore; Aqilah Sudhir; Jasmine Ser; Lim Chea Rong	Malaysia; Muslifah Zulkifli; Nur Suryani Taibi; Shahera Rahim Raja
10 m running target	Khamlar Xaiyavong; Laos	Thidarat Attakit; Thailand	Nguyên Thị Lệ Quyên; Vietnam
10 m running target team	Laos; Hongkham Xayyalath; Khamlar Xaiyavong; Phoutsady Phommachan	Vietnam; Cù Thị Thanh Tú; Đặng Hồng Hà; Nguyên Thị Lệ Quyên	Thailand; Chutima Aramruang; Rinlaphat Phatthanachaicharat; Thidarat Attakit
10 m running target mixed	Khamlar Xaiyavong; Laos	Đặng Hồng Hà; Vietnam	Hongkham Xayyalath; Laos
10 m running target mixed team	Vietnam; Cù Thị Thanh Tú; Đặng Hồng Hà; Nguyên Thị Lệ Quyên	Laos; Hongkham Xayyalath; Khamlar Xaiyavong; Phoutsady Phommachan	Thailand; Manassanant M Rinlaphat Phatthanachaicharat; Thidarat Attakit

Preceded by 2007	Shooting at the SEA Games; 2009 SEA Games	Succeeded by 2011
