= Swimming at the 2009 SEA Games – Women's 100 metre butterfly =

The Women's 100 Butterfly swimming event at the 2009 SEA Games was held on December 12, 2009, in Vientiane, Laos.

== Results ==
=== Final ===
Place	Lane	Swimmer	Nation	Time	Notes
1	1	Tao Li	Singapore	59.24	GR
2	3	Marellyn Liew	Malaysia	1:01.04	
3	2	Natnapa Prommuenwai	Thailand	1:01.79	
4	6	T Kim Tuyen Nguyen	Vietnam	1:02.11	
5	5	Jasmine Alkhaldi	Philippines	1:02.16	
6	7	Maria Gandionco	Philippines	1:02.42	
7	8	Hii Siew Siew	Malaysia	1:03.51	
8	4	Koh Ting Ting	Singapore	1:03.78	

=== Preliminary heats ===
Rank	Heat/Lane	Swimmer	Nation	Time	Notes
1	H1 L3	Koh Ting Ting	Singapore	1:03.47	Q
2	H1 L2	Jasmine Alkhaldi	Philippines	1:03.50	Q
3	H1 L4	Marellyn Liew	Malaysia	1:03.69	Q
4	H2 L5	T Kim Tuyen Nguyen	Vietnam	1:03.74	Q
5	H1 L5	Natnapa Prommuenwai	Thailand	1:03.87	Q
6	H2 L4	Tao Li	Singapore	1:03.88	Q
6	H2 L6	Maria Gandionco	Philippines	1:03.88	Q
8	H2 L3	Hii Siew Siew	Malaysia	1:04.05	Q
9	H1 L6	Ressa Ressa	Indonesia	1:05.41	
10	H2 L7	T Ngor Yen Nguyen	Vietnam	1:07.77	
11	H2 L2	Tiffani Sudharma	Indonesia	1:08.10	
12	H1 L7	V Veomany	Laos	1:29.25	
