= Swimming at the 2009 SEA Games – Men's 200 metre breaststroke =

Swimming – Men's 200 metre breaststroke at the 2009 SEA Games
- Date: 13 December 2009
- Winning time: 2:13.42 GR

Medalists
gold medal	Nuttapong Ketin	Thailand
silver medal	Nguyễn Hữu Việt	Vietnam
bronze medal	Indra Gunawan	Indonesia

The Men's 200 Breaststroke swimming event at the 2009 SEA Games was held on December 13, 2009. Nuttapong Ketin from Thailand won the event.

== Results ==
=== Final ===
Place	Swimmer	Nation	Time	Notes
1st place, gold medalist(s)	Nuttapong Ketin	Thailand	2:13.42	GR
2nd place, silver medalist(s)	Nguyễn Hữu Việt	Vietnam	2:15.25	
3rd place, bronze medalist(s)	Indra Gunawan	Indonesia	2:17.09	
4	Miguel Molina	Philippines	2:17.64	
5	Vorrawuti Aumpiwan	Thailand	2:17.72	
6	Idham Dasuki	Indonesia	2:19.56	
7	Yap See Tuan	Malaysia	2:23.08	
8	Mark Tan	Singapore	2:23.45	

=== Preliminary heats ===
Rank	Heat	Swimmer	Nation	Time	Notes
1	H1	Nguyễn Hữu Việt	Vietnam	2:20.31	Q
2	H1	Idham Dasuki	Indonesia	2:20.38	Q
3	H1	Nuttapong Ketin	Thailand	2:20.51	Q
4	H1	Vorrawuti Aupiwan	Thailand	2:21.12	Q
5	H2	Miguel Molina	Philippines	2:22.84	Q
6	H2	Mark Tan	Singapore	2:23.19	Q
7	H2	Indra Gunawan	Indonesia	2:24.26	Q
8	H2	Yap See Tuan	Malaysia	2:27.60	Q
9	H2	Banjo Borja	Philippines	2:28.83	
10	H1	A Anulack	Laos	2:57.09	
11	H2	S Soutsada	Laos	3:46.99	
-		Jia Hao Ng	Singapore	DQ	
