= Wushu at the 2009 SEA Games =

- Dates: 13-17 November 2009

Wushu was both a men's and women's event at the 2009 SEA Games in Vientianne, Laos held from December 13 to December 17, 2009.

== Medal summary ==
* Host nation (Laos)

Rank	Nation	Gold	Silver	Bronze	Total
1	Vietnam (VIE)	7	6	1	14
2	Laos (LAO)*	5	2	4	11
3	Malaysia (MAS)	3	1	3	7
4	Indonesia (INA)	2	6	3	11
5	Philippines (PHI)	2	2	4	8
6	Singapore (SIN)	1	1	0	2
7	Thailand (THA)	1	0	6	7
8	Myanmar (MYA)	0	3	4	7
9	Brunei (BRU)	0	1	1	2
10	Cambodia (CAM)	0	0	2	2
Totals (10 entries)		21	22	28	71

== Medalists ==
=== Men's taolu ===
Event	Gold	Silver	Bronze
Changquan	Aldy Lukman; Indonesia	Ang Eng Chong; Malaysia	Ng Say Yoke; Malaysia
Nanquan	Phạm Quốc Khánh; Vietnam	Heriyanto; Indonesia	Soe Kyaw; Myanmar
Taijiquan / Taijijian	Loh Jack Chang; Malaysia	Nguyen Thanh Tung; Vietnam	Parantac Daniel; Philippines
Duilian (Barehand)	Vietnam (VIE); Nguyen Huy Thanh; Tran Duc Trong; Tran Xuan Hiep	Singapore (SIN); Fung Jin Jie; Samuel Seah; Jaryl Tay	Thailand (THA); Baramee Kulsawadmongkol; Pitaya Sae Yang
Duilian (Weapon)	Laos (LAO); Anousone Sasabo; Bountang Soong; Siamphone Kongmary	Indonesia (INA); Aldy Lukman; Johannes Bie	Brunei (BRU); Isa Bin Bismi; Ismi Bin Bismi
Duilian (Weapon)	Laos (LAO); Anousone Sasabo; Bountang Soong; Siamphone Kongmary	Indonesia (INA); Aldy Lukman; Johannes Bie	Malaysia (MAS); Say Yoke; Yeap Wai Kin

=== Men's sanshou ===
Event	Gold	Silver	Bronze
48 kg	Tran Van Kien; Vietnam	Zulfahmi Fitria; Indonesia	Sengthavyxay Chanthasone; Laos
48 kg	Tran Van Kien; Vietnam	Zulfahmi Fitria; Indonesia	Aligaga Jessie; Philippines
52 kg	Khamla Soukaphone; Laos	Phan Van Hau; Vietnam	Tan Narith; Cambodia
52 kg	Khamla Soukaphone; Laos	Phan Van Hau; Vietnam	Gunawan; Indonesia
56 kg	Phoxay Aphailath; Laos	Benjie Rivera; Philippines	Sin Saksunnara; Cambodia
56 kg	Phoxay Aphailath; Laos	Benjie Rivera; Philippines	Apisak Rongpichai; Thailand
60 kg	Bouapha Valasith; Laos	Junaidi Sukamto Rahmat; Indonesia	Wai Lin Oo; Myanmar
60 kg	Bouapha Valasith; Laos	Junaidi Sukamto Rahmat; Indonesia	Labador Denver; Philippines
65 kg	Mark Eddiva; Philippines	Tin Lin Aung; Myanmar	Jefri T. Sinambela; Indonesia
65 kg	Mark Eddiva; Philippines	Tin Lin Aung; Myanmar	Nguyen Van Tuan; Vietnam
70 kg	Nguyen Dinh Khanh; Vietnam	Xayvong Sommay; Laos	Yong Yuthnoo; Thailand

=== Women's taolu ===
Event	Gold	Silver	Bronze
Changquan	Susyana Tjhan; Indonesia	Sandi Oo; Myanmar	That That Naing; Myanmar
Nanquan	Diana Bong Siong Lin; Malaysia	Vu Thuy Linh; Vietnam	Aint Mi Mi; Myanmar
Taijiquan / Taijijian	Chai Fong Ying; Malaysia	Lindswell; Indonesia	Wilai Ratanawongsaro; Thailand
Duilian (Barehand)	Laos (LAO); Soudaphone Chanlapheng; Ketsuda Vongphakdy	Myanmar (MYA); Sandy OO; That That Naing; Aint Mi Mi	Malaysia (MAS); Diana Bong Siong Lin; Tai Cheau Xuen
Duilian (Weapon)	Singapore (SIN); Khor Poh Chin; Tao Yi Jun; Tay Yu Juan	Vietnam (VIE); Vu Tra My; Vu Thuy Linh	Brunei (BRU); Faustina Woo Wai Sii; Lee Ying Shi

=== Women's Sanshou ===
Event	Gold	Silver	Bronze
45 kg	Do Thi Nhan; Vietnam	Kindala Phomemathang; Laos	Friska Ria Wibowo; Indonesia
45 kg	Do Thi Nhan; Vietnam	Kindala Phomemathang; Laos	Naree Pimpa; Thailand
48 kg	Chutdao Chaimala; Thailand	Tran Duy Phuong; Vietnam	Khamai Lathsavong; Laos
48 kg	Chutdao Chaimala; Thailand	Tran Duy Phuong; Vietnam	Rhea May Rifani; Philippines
52 kg	Nguyen Thuy Ngan; Vietnam	Estimar Mary Jane; Philippines	Toy; Laos
56 kg	Than Thi Ly; Vietnam	Moria Manalu; Indonesia	Phannipha Lukchanthuek; Thailand
60 kg	Mariano Marianne; Philippines	Nguyen Thi Oanh; Vietnam	Douangchay Thalengliep; Laos

== Events ==
=== Men ===
==== Changquan ====
- December 14 – Changquan
- December 16 – Gunshu

Rank	Name	NOC	Changquan	Gunshu	Points
1	Aldy Lukman	(Indonesia)	9.69	9.70	19.39
2	Ang Eng Chong	(Malaysia)	9.70	9.67	19.37
3	Ng Say Yoke	(Malaysia)	9.68	9.65	19.33
4	Tran Xuan Hiep	(Vietnam)	9.45	9.61	19.06
5	David Hendrawan	(Indonesia)	9.32	9.58	18.90
6	Poramet D.	(Thailand)	9.27	9.40	18.67
7	Sujinda Sae Yang	(Thailand)	8.51	9.35	17.86
8	Nguyen Manh Quyen	(Vietnam)	9.37	0.00	9.37
9	Aung Sithu	(Myanmar)	0.00	0.00	0.00

==== Nanquan ====
- December 15 – Nanquan
- December 16 – Nangun

Rank	Name	NOC	Changquan	Gunshu	Points
1	Pham Quoc Khanh	(Vietnam)	9.70	9.70	19.40
2	Heriyanto	(Indonesia)	9.65	9.66	19.31
3	Soe Kyaw	(Myanmar)	9.62	9.56	19.18
4	Kevan Cheah	(Malaysia)	9.61	9.51	19.12
5	Johannes Bie	(Indonesia)	9.60	9.33	18.93
6	Mun Hua	(Malaysia)	9.56	9.60	19.16
7	Harris Adli	(Brunei)	9.10	9.12	18.22
8	Brendan Goh	(Singapore)	8.86	9.50	18.36
9	Somdej Srisuk	(Thailand)	8.57	9.26	17.83
10	Panuwat Hnuyong	(Thailand)	7.97	8.67	16.64

==== Taijiquan ====
- December 14 – Taijiquan
- December 16 – Taijijian

Rank	Name	NOC	Taijiquan	Taijijian	Points
1	Loh Jack Chang	(Malaysia)	9.70	9.69	19.39
2	Nguyen Thanh Tung	(Vietnam)	9.64	9.65	19.29
3	Parantac Daniel	(Philippines)	9.60	9.62	19.22
4	Lee Yang	(Malaysia)	9.61	9.60	19.21
5	Soe Win Thein	(Myanmar)	9.52	9.60	19.12
6	Seet Wee Key	(Singapore)	9.63	9.40	19.03
7	Freddy	(Indonesia)	9.10	9.55	18.65
8	Yuttaphol S.	(Thailand)	8.97	9.35	18.32

==== Duilian (Barehand) ====
- December 13 – Final

Rank	Name	NOC	Points
1	Nguyen Huy Thanh; Tran Duc Trong; Tran Xuan Hiep	(Vietnam)	9.50
2	Fung Jin Jie; Samuel Seah; Jaryl Tay	(Singapore)	9.40
3	Baramee Kulsawadmongkol; Pitaya Sae Yang	(Thailand)	9.20

==== Duilian (Weapon) ====
- December 13 – Final

Rank	Name	NOC	Points
1	Anousone Sasabo; Bountang Soong; Siamphone Kongmary	(Laos)	9.50
2	Aldy Lukman; Johannes Bie	(Indonesia)	9.40
3	Is Bin Bismi; Ismi Bin Bismi	(Brunei)	9.20
3	Say Yoke; Yeap Wai Kin	(Malaysia)	9.20
5	Aung Sithu; Soe Kyaw	(Myanmar)	

==== Sanshou – 48 Kg ====
- Quartel Final – December 13

Aligaga Jessie (Philippines)	2–0	Bye
Tran Van Kien (Vietnam)	1.000–0.000	(Myanmar) Yar Zan Tun
Sengthavyxay (Laos)	1.000–0.000	(Thailand) Tom Suepsangat
Bye	-–-	(Indonesia) Zulfahmi Fitria

- Semi Final – December 15

Aligaga Jessie (Philippines)	0–2	(Vietnam) Tran Van Kien
Sengthavyxay (Laos)	0.000–1.000	(Indonesia) Zulfahmi Fitria

- Final – December 17

Tran Van Kien (Vietnam)	2–0	(Indonesia) Zulfahmi Fitria

==== Sanshou – 52 Kg ====
- Quartel Final – December 13

Gunawan (Indonesia)	-–-	Bye
Khamla (Laos)	1.000–0.000	(Thailand) Khwanyuen Chanthra
Phan Van Hau (Vietnam)	1.000–0.000	(Myanmar) Kyaw Naing Oo
Bye	-–-	(Cambodia) Tan Narith

- Semi Final – December 16

Gunawan (Indonesia)	0–2	(Laos) Khamla Soukaphone
Phan Van Hau	KO–	(Cambodia) Tan Narith

- Final – December 17

Khamla Soukaphone (Laos)	2–0	(Vietnam) Phan Van Hau

==== Sanshou – 56 Kg ====
- Semi Final – December 14

Sin Saksunnara (Cambodia)	0.000–1.000	(Philippines) Benjie Rivera
Apisak Rongpichai (Thailand)	0.000–1.000	(Laos) Phoxay Aphailath

- Final – December 17

Benjie Rivera (Philippines)	0–2	(Laos) Phoxay Aphailath

==== Sanshou – 60 Kg ====
- Quartel Final – December 13

Labador Denver (Philippines)	-–-	Bye
Phan Anh Yen (Vietnam)	0.000–1.000	(Laos) Bouapha Valasith
Junaidi Sukamto Rahmat (Indonesia)	-–-	Bye
Bye	-–-	(Myanmar) Wai Lin Oo

- Semi Final – December 15

Labador Denver (Philippines)	0–2	(Laos) Bouapha Valasith
Junaidi Sukamto Rahmat (Indonesia)	2–1	(Myanmar) Wai Lin Oo

- Final – December 17

Bouapha Valasith (Laos)	2–0	(Indonesia) Junaidi Sukamto Rahmat

==== Sanshou – 65 Kg ====
- Semi Final – December 14

Nguyen Van Tuan (Vietnam)	0.000–1.000	(Philippines) Mark Eddiva
Jefri T. Sinambela (Indonesia)	0.000–1.000	(Myanmar) Tin Lin Aung

- Final – December 17

Mark Eddiva (Philippines)	2–0	(Myanmar) Tin Lin Aung

==== Sanshou – 70 Kg ====
- December 14

Nguyen Dinh Khanh (Vietnam)	2–0	(Thailand) Yong Yuthnoo

- December 16

Nguyen Dinh Khanh (Vietnam)	2–0	(Laos) Xayvong Sommay

- December 17

Xayvong Sommay (Laos)	2–0	(Thailand) Yong Yuthnoo

=== Women ===
==== Changquan ====
- December 14 – Jianshu
- December 15 – Changquan

Rank	Name	NOC	Jianshu	Changquan	Points
1	Susyana Tjhan	(Indonesia)	9.68	9.69	19.37
2	Sandi Oo	(Myanmar)	9.53	9.64	19.17
3	That That Naing	(Myanmar)	9.54	9.50	19.04
4	Khaw Jing Yee	(Malaysia)	9.50	9.50	19.00
5	Fong Chui Theng	(Malaysia)	9.46	9.49	18.95
6	Duong Thuy Vi	(Vietnam)	9.56	9.37	18.93
7	Khor Poh Chin	(Singapore)	9.35	9.45	18.80
8	Vu Tra My	(Vietnam)	9.67	8.75	18.42
9	Suvanant Choowong	(Thailand)	8.90	7.22	16.12
10	Sirivimol Pinchan	(Thailand)	8.60	6.75	15.35

==== Nanquan ====
- December 14 – Nanquan
- December 15 – Nandao

Rank	Name	NOC	Nanquan	Nandao	Points
1	Diana Bong	(Malaysia)	9.70	9.66	19.38
2	Vu Thuy Linh	(Vietnam)	9.66	9.67	19.33
3	Aint Mi Mi	(Myanmar)	9.35	9.61	18.96
4	Tai Cheau Xuen	(Malaysia)	9.05	9.61	18.66
5	Ivana Ardelia	(Indonesia)	8.70	9.40	18.10
6	Pham Hong Ngoc	(Vietnam)	8.56	9.50	18.06
7	Faustina Woo Wai	(Brunei)	0.00	0.00	0.00

==== Taijiquans/Taijijian ====
- December 15 – Taijiquan
- December 16 – Taijijian

Rank	Name	NOC	Taijiquan	Taijijian	Points
1	Chai Fong Ying	(Malaysia)	9.66	9.70	19.32
2	Lindswell	(Indonesia)	9.60	9.70	19.30
3	Wilai R.	(Thailand)	9.60	9.61	19.21
4	Ng Shin Yii	(Malaysia)	9.55	9.60	19.15
5	Stephanie Agbay	(Philippines)	9.55	9.54	19.09
5	Tao Yi Jun	(Singapore)	9.53	9.56	19.09
5	Trant T Minh Huyen	(Vietnam)	9.50	9.59	19.09

==== Duilian (Barehand) ====
- December 13 – Final

Rank	Name	NOC	Points
1	Soudaphone Chanlapheng; Ketsuda Vongphakdy	(Laos)	9.46
2	Sandy OO; That That Naing; Aint Mi Mi	(Myanmar)	9.45
3	Diana Bong; Tai Cheau Xuen	(Malaysia)	9.40
4	Amara Suntornyard; Benjawan Wiranuwat; Rattana Mayudee	(Thailand)	9.25

==== Duilian (Weapon) ====
- December 13 – Final

Rank	Name	NOC	Points
1	Khor Poh Chin; Tao Yi Jun; Tay Yu Juan	(Singapore)	9.46
2	Vu Tra My; Vu Thuy Linh	(Vietnam)	9.45
2	Faustina Woo Wai; Lee Ying Shi	(Brunei)	9.45
4	Vania Rosalin Irmanto; Felicia Alverina Monindra; Cindy Sutanto	(Indonesia)	9.37
5	Fong Chui Theng; Chai Fong Wei	(Malaysia)	9.22

==== Sanshou – 45 Kg ====
- Semi Final – December 16

Do Thi Nhan (Vietnam)	2–0	(Thailand) Naree Pimpa
Friska Ria Wibowo (Indonesia)	1–2	(Laos) Kindala Phomemathang

- Final –

Do Thi Nhan (Vietnam)	2–1	(Laos) Kindala Phomemathang

==== Sanshou – 48 Kg ====
- Quartel Final – December 13

Tran Duy Phuong (Vietnam)	-–-	Bye
Khammai Lathsavong (Laos)	1.000–0.000	(Myanmar) Hla Hla Win
Hotma Dearma Purba (Indonesia)	0.000–1.000	(Philippines) Rhea May Rifani
Bye	-–-	(Thailand) Chutdao Chaimala

- Semi Final – December 15

Tran Duy Phuong (Vietnam)	2–0	(Laos) Khamai Lathsavong
Rhea May Rifani (Philippines)	–KO	(Thailand) Chutdao Chaimala

- Final –

Tran Duy Phuong (Vietnam)	0–2	(Thailand) Chutdao Chaimala

==== Sanshou – 52 Kg ====
- December 14

Nguyen Thuy Ngan (Vietnam)	2–0	(Laos) Toy

- December 15

Nguyen Thuy Ngan (Vietnam)	2–0	(Philippines) Estimar Mary Jane

- December 17

Toy (Laos)	0–2	(Philippines) Estimar Mary Jane

==== Sanshou – 56 Kg ====
- December 14

Than Thi Ly (Vietnam)	2–0	(Indonesia) Moria Manalu

- December 16

Than Thi Ly (Vietnam)	2–0	(Thailand) Phannipha Lukchanthuek

- December 17

Moria Manalu (Indonesia)	2–0	(Thailand) Phannipha Lukchanthuek

==== Sanshou – 60 Kg ====
- December 14

Mariano Marianne (Philippines)	2–1	(Laos) Douangchay Thalengliep

- December 16

Mariano Marianne (Philippines)	2–0	(Vietnam) Nguyen Thi Oanh

- December 17

Douangchay Thalengliep (Laos)	0–2	(Vietnam) Nguyen Thi Oanh
