= Archery at the 2009 SEA Games =

Archery at the 2009 SEA Games was held at the archery range at the National Sports Complex in Vientiane, Laos from 12 to 16 December 2009.

== Medal summary ==
Rank	Nation	Gold	Silver	Bronze	Total
1	Indonesia (INA)	3	1	1	5
2	Malaysia (MAS)	1	3	2	6
3	Myanmar (MYA)	1	2	2	5
4	Thailand (THA)	1	0	2	3
5	Philippines (PHI)	1	0	1	2
6	Vietnam (VIE)	1	0	0	1
7	Singapore (SIN)	0	2	0	2
Totals (7 entries)		8	8	8	24

== Results ==
=== Recurve ===
Event	Gold	Silver	Bronze
Men's individual	Cheng Chu Sian; Malaysia	Zaw Win Htike; Myanmar	Arif Farhan Ibrahim Putra; Malaysia
Women's individual	Novia Nuraini; Indonesia	Anbrasi Subramaniam; Malaysia	Noor Aziera Taip; Malaysia
Men's team	Thailand (THA); Denchai Thepna; Khomkrit Duangsuwan; Witthaya Thamwong	Malaysia (MAS); Fazli Hisham; Arif Farhan Ibrahim Putra; Cheng Chu Sian	Myanmar (MYA); Yan Aung Soe; Zaw Win Htike; Nay Myo Aung
Women's team	Indonesia (INA); Ika Yuliana Rochmawati; Novia Nuraini; Rina Dewi Puspitasari	Singapore (SIN); Vanessa Loh Tze Rong; Wendy Tan Liu Jie; Samantha Wong Sook Wai	Myanmar (MYA); San Yu Thwe; Thazin Aung; Thin Thin Khaing

=== Compound ===
Event	Gold	Silver	Bronze
Men's individual	I Gusti Nyoman Puruhito; Indonesia	Adriel Chua Boon Rong; Singapore	Earl Benjamin Yap; Philippines
Women's individual	Jennifer Dy Chan; Philippines	Aung Ngeain; Myanmar	Narisara Tinbua; Thailand
Men's team	Vietnam (VIE); Nguyen Tien Cuong; Nguyen Thanh Tuan; Vu Viet Anh	Indonesia (INA); Kuswantoro; Hendra Setijawan; I Gusti Nyoman Puruhito	Thailand (THA); Chakrit Thong Wattana; Jitti Keanthonglang; Pramuk Suwannapatip
Women's team	Myanmar (MYA); Aung Ngeain; Hla Hla San; Khin Lay Nu	Malaysia (MAS); Fatin Nurfatehah Mat Salleh; Nur Hidayah Abdul Latif; Saritha Cham Nong	Indonesia (INA); Lilies Heliarti; Dellie Threesyadinda; Foury Akadiani Kusumaniyah
