= Boxing at the 2009 SEA Games =

This is the Summary of the Boxing event at the 2009 SEA Games in Vientiane, Laos.

== Medal table ==
* Host nation (Laos)

Rank	Nation	Gold	Silver	Bronze	Total
1	Thailand	7	0	3	10
2	Philippines	5	1	3	9
3	Malaysia	2	0	1	3
4	Laos*	1	4	5	10
5	Vietnam	0	5	3	8
6	Indonesia	0	3	6	9
7	Cambodia	0	1	4	5
8	Myanmar	0	1	3	4
9	Singapore	0	0	1	1
9	Timor-Leste	0	0	1	1
Totals (10 entries)		15	15	30	60

== Medalists ==
=== Men ===
Event	Gold	Silver	Bronze
Pinweight; 45 Kg	Vicera Bill; Philippines	Sikham Vongpakhoun; Laos	Huỳnh Ngọc Tân; Vietnam
Pinweight; 45 Kg	Vicera Bill; Philippines	Sikham Vongpakhoun; Laos	Ven Diaman; Cambodia
Light flyweight 48 Kg	Kaeo Pongprayoon; Thailand	Harry Tañamor; Philippines	Htet Aung; Myanmar
Light flyweight 48 Kg	Kaeo Pongprayoon; Thailand	Harry Tañamor; Philippines	Oriando Dos Santos; Timor-Leste
Flyweight; 51 Kg	Amnat Ruenroeng; Thailand	Xayyaphone Chanthasone; Laos	Saludar Rey; Philippines
Flyweight; 51 Kg	Amnat Ruenroeng; Thailand	Xayyaphone Chanthasone; Laos	Julio Bria; Indonesia
Bantamweight; 54 Kg	Chatchai Butdee; Thailand	Matius Mandiangan; Indonesia	Muhammad Ali Abdul Karim; Malaysia
Bantamweight; 54 Kg	Chatchai Butdee; Thailand	Matius Mandiangan; Indonesia	Trần Quốc Việt; Vietnam
Featherweight; 57 Kg	Charly Suarez; Philippines	Phal Sophat; Cambodia	Arenaldo; Indonesia
Featherweight; 57 Kg	Charly Suarez; Philippines	Phal Sophat; Cambodia	Wuttichai Masuk; Thailand
Lightweight; 60 Kg	Saylom Ardee; Thailand	Pyae Phyo Hein; Myanmar	Khairul Hamid; Singapore
Lightweight; 60 Kg	Saylom Ardee; Thailand	Pyae Phyo Hein; Myanmar	Khounthavisak Moneboudsady; Laos
Light welterweight 64 Kg	Vilasak Khouandy; Laos	Pham Son Tung; Vietnam	Svay Ratha; Cambodia
Light welterweight 64 Kg	Vilasak Khouandy; Laos	Pham Son Tung; Vietnam	Joegin Landon; Philippines
Welterweight; 69 Kg	Apichet Saensit; Thailand	Chanthachone Keoudone; Laos	Hin Saiheng; Cambodia
Welterweight; 69 Kg	Apichet Saensit; Thailand	Chanthachone Keoudone; Laos	Trương Đình Hoàng; Vietnam
Middleweight; 75 Kg	Muhammad Farkhan; Malaysia	Cao Văn Trọng; Vietnam	Aung Ko Ko; Myanmar
Middleweight; 75 Kg	Muhammad Farkhan; Malaysia	Cao Văn Trọng; Vietnam	Nasruddin; Indonesia
Light heavyweight 81 Kg	Muhd Fairus Azwa; Malaysia	Achmad Amri; Indonesia	Sisuphanh Lavilaiseng; Laos
Light heavyweight 81 Kg	Muhd Fairus Azwa; Malaysia	Achmad Amri; Indonesia	Eh Phouthong; Cambodia

=== Women ===
Event	Gold	Silver	Bronze
Pinweight; 46 Kg	Josie Gabuco; Philippines	Nguyễn Thị Hoa; Vietnam	Phaisavane Nok; Laos
Pinweight; 46 Kg	Josie Gabuco; Philippines	Nguyễn Thị Hoa; Vietnam	Kyu Kyu Thin; Myanmar
Light flyweight 48 Kg	Alice Aparri; Philippines	Milvady Hongfa; Laos	Selly Wanimbo; Indonesia
Light flyweight 48 Kg	Alice Aparri; Philippines	Milvady Hongfa; Laos	Dueannapha Ngamlam; Thailand
Flyweight; 51 kg	Albania Annie; Philippines	Indri Sambaimana; Indonesia	Somphone Keosila; Laos
Flyweight; 51 kg	Albania Annie; Philippines	Indri Sambaimana; Indonesia	Sopida Satumrum; Thailand
Bantamweight; 54 kg	Thassamalee Thongjan; Thailand	Đoàn Thị Liên; Vietnam	Welmi Pariama; Indonesia
Bantamweight; 54 kg	Thassamalee Thongjan; Thailand	Đoàn Thị Liên; Vietnam	Manivone Phimsomphou; Laos
Featherweight; 57 Kg	Peamwilai Laopeam; Thailand	Ngô Thị Chung; Vietnam	Yunike Busira; Indonesia
Featherweight; 57 Kg	Peamwilai Laopeam; Thailand	Ngô Thị Chung; Vietnam	Mitchel Matinez; Philippines

== Results ==
=== Men's Events ===
==== Pin Weight - 45 Kilograms ====
Quarterfinals; 11 December
(Malaysia) Muhamad Fuad	5
(Philippines) Vicera Bill	7

Semifinals; 15 December
(Laos) Sikham Vongpakhoun
(Vietnam) Huynh Ngoc Tan	RET
(Cambodia) Ven Diaman	2
(Philippines) Vicera Bill	13

Final; 17 December
(Laos) Sikham Vongpakhoun	3
(Philippines) Vicera Bill	6

==== Light Fly Weight - 48 Kilograms ====
Quarterfinals	Semifinals; 13 December		Final; 17 December
	(Timor-Leste) Oriando Dos Santos
	(Thailand) Kaeo Pongprayoon	RSCOS
			(Thailand) Kaeo Pongprayoon	3
			(Philippines) Harry Tanamor	1
	(Philippines) Harry Tanamor	12
	(Myanmar) Htet Aung	4

==== Fly Weight - 51 Kilograms ====
Quarterfinals; 11 December
(Vietnam) Nguyen Van Hai	2
(Thailand) Amnat Ruenroeng	6
(Indonesia) Julio Bria	11
(Cambodia) Long Lamda	2

Semifinals; 15 December
(Philippines) Saludar Rey	4
(Laos) Xayyaphone Chanthasone	9
(Thailand) Amnat Ruenroeng	5
(Indonesia) Julio Bria	2

Final; 17 December
(Laos) Xayyaphone Chanthasone	1
(Thailand) Amnat Ruenroeng	1+

==== Bantam Weight - 54 Kilograms ====
Quarterfinals; 11 December
(Philippines) Joan Tipon	4
(Thailand) Chatchai Buddee	9

Semifinals; 15 December
(Malaysia) Muhammad Ali Abdul Karim	4
(Indonesia) Matius Mandingan	11
(Vietnam) Tran Quoc Viet	1
(Thailand) Chatchai Buddee	6

Final; 17 December
(Indonesia) Matius Mandingan	2
(Thailand) Chatchai Buddee	11

==== Feather Weight - 57 Kilograms ====
Quarterfinals; 11 December
(Laos) Xayyalak Chantasone	5
(Indonesia) Arenaldo	8
(Cambodia) Phal Sophat	14
(Malaysia) Eddey Kalai	7
(Philippines) Charly Suarez	KO
(Timor-Leste) Manuel Batisia
(Singapore) Ridhwan Ahmad	4
(Thailand) Wuttichai Masuk	16

Semifinals; 15 December
(Indonesia) Arenaldo	5
(Cambodia) Phal Sophat	6
(Philippines) Charly Suarez	13
(Thailand) Wuttichai Masuk	5

Final; 17 December
(Cambodia) Phal Sophat
(Philippines) Charly Suarez	KO

==== Light Weight - 60 Kilograms ====
Quarterfinals	Semifinals; 13 December		Final; 17 December
	(Singapore) Khairul Hamid	2
	(Myanmar) Pyae Phyo Hein	22
			(Myanmar) Pyae Phyo Hein	1
			(Thailand) Saylom Ardee	9
	(Laos) Khounthavisak Moneboudsady
	(Thailand) Saylom Ardee	RSC

==== Light Welter Weight - 64 Kilograms ====
Quarterfinals; 11 December
(Cambodia) Svay Ratha	5+
(Malaysia) Paunandes	5
(Timor-Leste) Hendromartins	0
(Vietnam) Pham Son Tung	7

Semifinals; 15 December
(Philippines) Joegin Landon	2
(Laos) Vilasak Khouandy	8
(Cambodia) Svay Ratha	4
(Vietnam) Pham Son Tung	6

Final; 17 December
(Laos) Vilasak Khouandy	5
(Vietnam) Pham Son Tung	0

==== Welter Weight - 69 Kilograms ====
Quarterfinals	Semifinals; 13 December		Final; 17 December
	(Thailand) Apichet Saensit	11
	(Vietnam) Truong Ding Hoang	1
			(Thailand) Apichet Saensit	RSC
			(Laos) Chanthachone Keoudone
	(Laos) Chanthachone Keoudone	6
	(Cambodia) Hin Saiheng	0

==== Middle Weight - 75 Kilograms ====
Quarterfinals	Semifinals; 13 December		Final; 17 December
	(Myanmar) Aung Ko Ko	1
	(Vietnam) Cao Van Trong	10
			(Vietnam) Cao Van Trong	1
			(Malaysia) Muhamad Farkhan	4
	(Malaysia) Muhamad Farkhan	15
	(Indonesia) Nasruddin	4

==== Light Heavy Weight - 81 Kilograms ====
Quarterfinals	Semifinals; 13 December		Final; 17 December
	(Cambodia) Eh Phouthong	3
	(Malaysia) Muhd Fairus Azwa	9
			(Malaysia) Muhd Fairus Azwa	11
			(Indonesia) Achmad Amri	3
	(Laos) Sisuphanh Lavilaiseng	8
	(Indonesia) Achmad Amri	12

=== Women's Events ===
==== Pin Weight - 46 Kilograms ====
Quarterfinals	Semifinals; 12 December		Final; 16 December
	(Vietnam) Nguyen Thi Hoa	9
	(Laos) Nok Phaisavane	0
			(Vietnam) Nguyen Thi Hoa	5
			(Philippines) Josie Gabuco	6
	(Philippines) Josie Gabuco	6
	(Myanmar) Kyu Kyu Thin	1

==== Light Fly Weight - 48 Kilograms ====
Quarterfinals; 12 December
(Vietnam) Ngo Thi Phuong
(Philippines) Alice Apparri	RSCH

Semifinals; 14 December
(Laos) Milvady Hongfa	15
(Indonesia) Selly Wanimbo	8
(Thailand) Dueannapha Ngamlam	2
(Philippines) Alice Apparri	2+

Final; 16 December
(Laos) Milvady Hongfa	4
(Philippines) Alice Apparri	15

==== Fly Weight - 51 Kilograms ====
Quarterfinals; 12 December
(Myanmar) Hnin Moh Mo Nain	0
(Philippines) Albania Annie	7

Semifinals; 14 December
(Indonesia) Indri Sambaimana	3
(Laos) Somphone Keosila	0
(Thailand) Sopida Satumrum	4
(Philippines) Albania Annie	6

Final; 16 December
(Indonesia) Indri Sambaimana
(Philippines) Albania Annie	RSC

==== Bantam Weight - 54 Kilograms ====
Quarterfinals	Semifinals; 14 December		Final; 16 December
	(Thailand) Thassamalee Thongjan	5
	(Laos) Manivone Phimsomphou	0
			(Thailand) Thassamalee Thongjan	7
			(Vietnam) Doan Thi Lien	1
	(Vietnam) Doan Thi Lien	10
	(Indonesia) Welmi Pariama	2

==== Feather Weight - 57 Kilograms ====
Quarterfinals; 12 December
(Myanmar) Kyu Kyu Hlaing	1
(Thailand) Peamwilai Laopeam	14

Semifinals; 14 December
(Indonesia) Yunike Busira
(Vietnam) Ngo Thi Chung	RSC(INJ)
(Philippines) Mitchel Matinez	4
(Thailand) Peamwilai Laopeam	7

Final; 16 December
(Vietnam) Ngo Thi Chung	4
(Thailand) Peamwilai Laopeam	6

==== Light Weight - 60 Kilograms ====
- Canceled Event

Preceded by 2007	Boxing at the SEA Games; 2009 SEA Games	Succeeded by 2011
