= Swimming at the 2009 SEA Games – Women's 400 metre individual medley =

The Women's 400 Individual Medley (or "I.M.") swimming event at the 2009 SEA Games was held in December 2009.

The Games Record at the start of the event was 4:51.87, swum by Joscelin Yeo at the 1999 SEA Games (on August 13).

== Results ==
=== Final ===
Place	Swimmer	Nation	Time	Notes
1	Natthanan J.	Thailand	4:55.07	
2	QUAH Ting Wen	Singapore	4:56.32	
3	Hui Yu Koh	Singapore	4:56.73	
4	Fibriani Marita	Indonesia	4:57.16	
5	Chavisa T.	Thailand	4:58.30	
6	SIOW Yi Ting	Malaysia	5:05.45	
7	T Kim Tuyen Nguyen	Vietnam	5:05.45	
8	Ressa Ressa	Indonesia	5:17.78	

=== Preliminary heats ===
Rank	Swimmer	Nation	Time	Notes
1	Fibriani Marita	Indonesia	5:09.82	Q
2	SIOW Yi Ting	Malaysia	5:11.21	Q
3	Chavisa T.	Thailand	5:13.84	Q
4	Natthanan J.	Thailand	5:18.71	Q
5	Ressa Ressa	Indonesia	5:19.18	Q
6	QUAH Ting Wen	Singapore	5:19.06	Q
7	Hui Yu Koh	Singapore	5:20.33	Q
8	T Kim Tuyen Nguyen	Vietnam	5:27.06	Q
9	Wei Li Lai	Malaysia	5:27.23	
