= Swimming at the 2009 SEA Games – Women's 100 metre backstroke =

Swimming – Women's 100 metre backstroke at the 2009 SEA Games
- Date: 12 December 2009
- Winning time: 1:02.96 GR

Medalists
gold medal	Tao Li	Singapore
silver medal	Shana Lim	Singapore
bronze medal	Chui Lai Kwan	Malaysia

The Women's 100 Backstroke swimming event at the 25th SEA Games was held on December 12, 2009.

== Results ==
=== Final ===
Place	Lane	Swimmer	Nation	Time	Notes
1st place, gold medalist(s)	1	Tao Li	Singapore	1:02.96	GR
2nd place, silver medalist(s)	3	Shana Lim	Singapore	1:03.56	
3rd place, bronze medalist(s)	2	Chui Lai Kwan	Malaysia	1:03.91	
4	6	Tiffani Sudharma	Indonesia	1:05.10	
5	5	Dorothy Hong	Philippines	1:05.95	
6	7	Chavisa Thaveesupsoonthorn	Thailand	1:06.45	
7	8	Thi Thom Duong	Vietnam	1:06.87	
8	4	Navarat Thongkaew	Thailand	1:07.87	

=== Preliminary heats ===
Rank	Heat/Lane	Swimmer	Nation	Time	Notes
1	H1 L5	Tiffani Sudharma	Indonesia	1:05.37	Q
2	H1 L4	Shana Lim	Singapore	1:05.82	Q
3	H2 L5	Chui Lai Kwan	Malaysia	1:05.84	Q
4	H2 L4	Tao Li	Singapore	1:06.11	Q
5	H1 L3	Dorothy Hong	Philippines	1:06.80	Q
6	H2 L3	Chavisa Thaveesupsoonthorn	Thailand	1:06.90	Q
7	H1 L2	Navarat Thongkaew	Thailand	1:07.82	Q
8	H1 L6	Thi Thom Duong	Vietnam	1:07.94	Q
9	H2 L6	Fibriani R Marita	Indonesia	1:08.44	
10	H2 L2	Karmen Cheng	Malaysia	1:09.27	
11	H2 L7	Hemthon Vitiny	Cambodia	1:16.27	
12	H1 L7	Seng Sam Phors	Cambodia	1:19.24	
13	H2 L1	D Daoheuang	Laos	1:22.18	
14	H1 L1	N Napha	Laos	1:32.33	
