= Swimming at the 2009 SEA Games – Men's 4 × 100 metre medley relay =

The Men's 4x100 Medley Relay swimming event at the 2009 SEA Games was held in December 2009. The team from Indonesia won the event.

== Results ==
=== Final ===
Place	Lane	Nation	Swimmers	Time	Notes
1		Indonesia	Guntur Pratama Putra; Indra Gunawan; Glenn Victor Sutanto; Triady Fauzi Sidiq	3:41.72	GR
2		Singapore		3:44.15	
3		Philippines		3:46.32	
4		Malaysia		3:48.93	
5		Thailand		3:49.45	
6		Vietnam		3:51.70	
7		Laos		5:03.54	
