= Swimming at the 2009 SEA Games – Women's 100 metre breaststroke =

The Women's 100 Breaststroke swimming event at the 2009 SEA Games was held on December 11, 2009.

== Results ==
=== Final ===
Place	Lane	Swimmer	Nation	Time	Notes
1	4	Yi Ting Siow	Malaysia	1:09.82	GR, NR
2	5	Roanne Ho	Singapore	1:12.54	
3	8	Erika Kong	Malaysia	1:13.18	
4	7	Thi Hue Pham	Vietnam	1:13.49	
5	1	Cheryl Lim	Singapore	1:13.60	
6	2	Phiangkhwan P	Thailand	1:13.88	
7	3	Panward Jitpairoj	Thailand	1:14.39	
8	6	Afi Noviandri	Indonesia	1:14.50	

=== Preliminary heats ===
Rank	Heat/Lane	Swimmer	Nation	Time	Notes
1	H1 L4	Yi Ting Siow	Malaysia	1:11.70	Q
2	H1 L4	Roanne Ho	Singapore	1:13.18	Q
3	H2 L2	Panward Jitpairoj	Thailand	1:14.35	Q
4	H2 L6	Afi Noviandri	Indonesia	1:14.37	Q
5	H1 L2	Phiangkhwan P	Thailand	1:14.52	Q
6	H2 L5	Thi Hue Pham	Vietnam	1:14.83	Q
7	H1 L3	Cheryl Lim	Singapore	1:14.86	Q
8	H1 L5	Erika Kong	Malaysia	1:15.04	Q
9	H2 L6	Thi Thuan Tran	Vietnam	1:15.71	
10	H2 L3	KP Margaretha	Indonesia	1:16.30	
11	H2 L7	Hem Thon Vitiny	Cambodia	1:29.17	
12	H1 L1	T Thepaksone	Laos	1:38.51	
13	H2 L1	C Chansamone	Laos	1:41.28	
14	H1 L7	Yin Davin	Cambodia	1:44.78	
