= Swimming at the 2009 SEA Games – Women's 200 metre breaststroke =

The Women's 200 Breaststroke swimming event at the 2009 SEA Games was held on December 13, 2009. Yi Ting Siow of Malaysia won the event.

== Results ==
=== Final ===
Place	Lane	Swimmer	Nation	Time	Notes
1	4	Yi Ting Siow	Malaysia	2:30.35	GR
2	5	Cheryl Lim	Singapore	2:34.73	
3	2	Thi Hue Pham	Vietnam	2:35.79	
4	3	Samantha Yeo	Singapore	2:36.04	
5	7	Phiangkhwan P	Thailand	2:40.83	
6	6	Christina Loh	Malaysia	2:41.03	
7	1	Afi Noviandri	Indonesia	2:41.79	
8	8	KP Margaretha	Indonesia	2:48.57	

=== Preliminary heats ===
Rank	Heat/Lane	Swimmer	Nation	Time	Notes
1	H2 L4	Yi Ting Siow	Malaysia	2:35.89	Q
2	H1 L5	Cheryl Lim	Singapore	2:37.51	Q
3	H2 L3	Samantha Yeo	Singapore	2:37.98	Q
4	H1 L3	Christina Loh	Malaysia	2:38.04	Q
5	H1 L4	Thi Hue Pham	Vietnam	2:38.48	Q
6	H1 L2	Phiangkhwan P	Thailand	2:44.84	Q
7	H2 L5	Afi Noviandri	Indonesia	2:45.91	Q
8	H2 L2	KP Margaretha	Indonesia	2:49.01	Q
9	H1 L6	Thi Thuan Tran	Vietnam	2:53.93	
10	H2 L6	Panward Jitpairoj	Thailand	2:34.52	
11	H2 L7	Hemthon Vitiny	Cambodia	3:13.80	
