= Swimming at the 2009 SEA Games – Women's 4 × 200 metre freestyle relay =

The Women's 4x200 Freestyle Relay swimming event at the 2009 SEA Games was held in December 2009. The team from Singapore won the event.

== Results ==
=== Final ===
Place	Lane	Nation	Swimmers	Time	Notes
1		Singapore	Lynette Lim; Amanda Lim; Mylene Ong; Quah Ting Wen	8:11.75	GR
2		Thailand	Benjaporn Sriphanomtorn; Rutai Santadvatana; Jiratida Phinyosophon; Natthanan Junkrajang	8:18.00	
3		Malaysia		8:29.12	

Note: Results appear to be incomplete (i.e. there were most likely more than 3 teams in the final).
