= Swimming at the 2009 SEA Games – Women's 800 metre freestyle =

Swimming – Women's 800 metre freestyle at the 2009 SEA Games
- Date: 12 December 2009
- Winning time: 8:35.41 GR

Medalists
gold medal	Lynette Lim	Singapore
silver medal	Khoo Cai Lin	Malaysia
bronze medal	Rutai Santadvatana	Thailand

The Women's 800 Freestyle swimming event at the 25th SEA Games was held on December 12, 2009.

== Results ==
The women's 800 Free at was swum as a timed final event, meaning that each swimmer only swam the race once and all times were aggregated together for final placing.

Place	Heat/Lane	Swimmer	Nation	Time	Notes
1st place, gold medalist(s)	H2 L4	Lynette Lim	Singapore	8:35.41	GR
2nd place, silver medalist(s)	H2 L5	Khoo Cai Lin	Malaysia	8:45.36	
3rd place, bronze medalist(s)	H2 L6	Rutai Santadvatana	Thailand	8:50.50	
4	H2 L3	Erica Rotten	Philippines	8:54.96	
5	H1 L4	Hui Yu Koh	Malaysia	9:04.67	
6	H2 L2	Wei Li Lai	Thailand	9:09.16	
7	H2 L7	Patarawadee K	Singapore	9:08.58	
8	H1 L5	Raina Saumi	Indonesia	9:15.65	
9	H1 L3	Jasmine Ong	Philippines	9:50.63	
