= Swimming at the 2009 SEA Games – Women's 400 metre freestyle =

Swimming – Women's 400 metre freestyle at the 2009 SEA Games
- Date: 11 December 2009
- Winning time: 4:00.75 GR

Medalists
gold medal	Khoo Cai Lin	Malaysia
silver medal	Lynette Lim	Singapore
bronze medal	Quah Ting Wen	Singapore

The Women's 400 Freestyle swimming event at the 25th SEA Games was held on December 11, 2009.

== Results ==
=== Final ===
Place	Lane	Swimmer	Nation	Time	Notes
1st place, gold medalist(s)	4	Khoo Cai Lin	Malaysia	4:10.75	GR
2nd place, silver medalist(s)	5	Lynette Lim	Singapore	4:11.24	
3rd place, bronze medalist(s)	6	Quah Ting Wen	Singapore	4:17.85	
4	3	Rutai Santadvatana	Thailand	4:19.10	
5	7	Erica Totten	Philippines	4:21.70	
6	8	Wei Li Lai	Malaysia	4:28.20	
7	2	Benjaporn Sriphanomtorn	Thailand	4:30.48	
8	1	Raina Saumi	Indonesia	4:30.74	

=== Preliminary heats ===
Rank	Heat/Lane	Swimmer	Nation	Time	Notes
1	H2 L5	Khoo Cai Lin	Malaysia	4:27.50	Q
2	H1 L4	Lynette Lim	Singapore	4:27.78	Q
3	H1 L5	Erica Totten	Philippines	4:28.00	Q
4	H2 L4	Quah Ting Wen	Singapore	4:28.07	Q
5	H1 L3	Rutai Santadvatana	Thailand	4:28.10	Q
6	H2 L6	Wei Li Lai	Malaysia	4:29.71	Q
7	H1 L6	Raina Saumi	Indonesia	4:29.95	Q
8	H2 L3	Benjaporn Sriphanomtorn	Thailand	4:33.56	Q
9	H2 L2	Ressa Ressa	Indonesia	4:36.85	
