= Swimming at the 2009 SEA Games – Men's 4 × 100 metre freestyle relay =

The Men's 4x100 Free Relay swimming event at the 2009 SEA Games was held in December 2009. The team from Singapore won the event.

== Results ==
=== Final ===
| Place | Lane | Nation | Swimmers | Time | Notes |
|---|---|---|---|---|---|
| 1 | | Singapore | Lim Wen Hao Joshua; Lim Yong En Clement; Ong Kai Yi Russel; Su Shirong Jeffrey | 3:23.22 | GR |
| 2 | | Philippines | | 3:24.35 | |
| 3 | | Indonesia | | 3:25.34 | |
| 4 | | Malaysia | | 3:27.87 | |
| 5 | | Thailand | | 3:31.72 | |
| 6 | | Cambodia | | 4:12.76 | |
| 7 | | Laos | | 4:16.53 | |
