= Swimming at the 2009 SEA Games – Women's 200 metre individual medley =

The Women's 200 Individual Medley (or "I.M.") swimming event at the 2009 SEA Games was held on December 10, 2009.

== Results ==
=== Final ===
Place	Lane	Swimmer	Nation	Time	Notes
1	4	Yi Ting Siow	Malaysia	2:14.57	GR
2	8	Natthanan Junkrajang	Thailand	2:18.98	
3	2	Hui Yu Koh	Singapore	2:20.71	
4	3	Fibriani R Marita	Indonesia	2:21.00	
5	1	Chavisa T	Thailand	2:21.57	
6	5	Koh Ting Ting	Singapore	2:25.71	
7	6	Ressa Ressa	Indonesia	2:26.34	
8	7	Erika Kong	Malaysia	2:28.24	

=== Preliminary heats ===
Rank	Heat/Lane	Swimmer	Nation	Time	Notes
1	H2 L4	Yi Ting Siow	Malaysia	2:21.16	Q
2	H2 L3	Koh Ting Ting	Singapore	2:26.42	Q
3	H2 L5	Fibriani R Marita	Indonesia	2:26.63	Q
4	H1 L3	Ressa Ressa	Indonesia	2:27.05	Q
5	H2 L6	Hui Yu Koh	Singapore	2:27.55	Q
6	H1 L6	Erika Kong	Malaysia	2:31.01	Q
6	H1 L5	Chavisa T	Thailand	2:32.17	Q
8	H1 L4	Natthanan Junkrajang	Thailand	2:32.42	Q
