= Mylene Ong =

Singaporean swimmer (born 1991)

Personal information
- Full name: Ong Chui Bin
- Nationality: SIN
- Born: 23 July 1991 (age 34) Singapore
- Height: 1.70 m (5 ft 7 in)
- Weight: 55 kg (121 lb)

Sport
- Sport: Swimming
- Strokes: Freestyle
Medal record
Women's swimming
Representing Singapore
Southeast Asian Games
Gold medal – first place	2009 Vientiane	4×100m freestyle
Gold medal – first place	2009 Vientiane	4×200 m freestyle
Gold medal – first place	2011 Palembang	4×100m freestyle
Gold medal – first place	2011 Palembang	4×200m freestyle
Silver medal – second place	2007 Nakhon Ratchasima	4×200m freestyle
Silver medal – second place	2011 Palembang	50m freestyle
Silver medal – second place	2011 Palembang	100m freestyle
Silver medal – second place	2013 Naypyidaw	4×100m freestyle
Bronze medal – third place	2011 Palembang	50m butterfly

Mylene Ong Chui Bin (Ong Chui Bin, Chinese: 王翠彬, born 23 July 1991) is a Singaporean swimmer. At the 2012 Summer Olympics, she competed in the Women's 100-metre freestyle, finishing in 29th place overall in the heats, failing to qualify for the semifinals.

Ong won medals at the 2007, 2009, and 2011 Southeast Asian Games. She also competed at the 2006 and 2010 Asian Games, and the 2006 Commonwealth Games.
