= Swimming at the 2009 SEA Games – Men's 4 × 200 metre freestyle relay =

The Men's 4x200 Free Relay swimming event at the 2009 SEA Games was held in December 2009. The team from Singapore won the event.

== Results ==
=== Final ===
Place	Lane	Nation	Swimmers	Time	Notes
1		Singapore	Cheah Mingzhe Marcus; Lim Wen Hao Joshua; Lim Yong En Clement; Ong Wei Shien Zach	7:30.73	
2		Philippines		7:31.10	
3		Malaysia		7:36.89	
4		Thailand		7:44.36	
5		Indonesia		7:44.51	
6		Laos		10:22.72	
