= Brunei at the 2009 SEA Games =

Brunei at the 2009 Southeast Asian Games
- IOC code: BRU
- NOC: Brunei Darussalam National Olympic Council
- Website: www.bruneiolympic.org (in English)

in Vientiane
- Flag bearer: Norleyermay Haji Raya (Pencak Silat)
- Medals Ranked 10th: Gold 1 Silver 1 Bronze 8 Total 10

Southeast Asian Games appearances (overview)
- 1977; 1979; 1981; 1983; 1985; 1987; 1989; 1991; 1993; 1995; 1997; 1999; 2001; 2003; 2005; 2007; 2009; 2011; 2013; 2015; 2017; 2019; 2021; 2023; 2025; 2027; 2029

Brunei participated in the 2009 Southeast Asian Games in the city of Vientiane, Laos, from 9 December 2009 to 18 December 2009.

== Medal table ==
Sport	Gold	Silver	Bronze	Total
Pencak silat	1	0	3	4
Wushu	0	1	1	2
Karate	0	0	4	4
Total	1	1	8	10

== Medalists ==
Medal	Name	Sport	Event
Gold	Hj Khairul Bahrin	Pencak silat	Men's single artistic
Silver	Faustina Woo Wai Sii; Lee Ying Shi	Wushu	Women's taolu duilian (with weapon)
Bronze	Fadilah Sanif	Karate	Men's kumite 67 kg
Bronze	Mainudin Mohamad	Karate	Men's kumite 84 kg
Bronze	Jamil Hj Abd Majid	Karate	Men's kumite >84 kg
Bronze	Masdianah Hj Tengah	Karate	Women's kumite 50 kg
Bronze	Amirul Bin Ahat	Pencak silat	Men's tarung 45–50 kg
Bronze	Khuzaiman Ahmad	Pencak silat	Men's tarung 60–65 kg
Bronze	Freddy Ashrol Choo	Pencak silat	Men's tarung 75–80 kg
Bronze	Isa Bin Bismi; Ismi Bin Bismi	Wushu	Men's taolu duilian (with weapon)
