= Swimming at the 2009 SEA Games – Women's 4 × 100 metre freestyle relay =

The Women's 4x100 Freestyle Relay swimming event at the 2009 SEA Games was held on December 11, 2009. Of note, in the event's final, the top-3 teams all swam faster than the then-Games Record in the event. The team from Singapore won the event.

== Results ==
=== Final ===
Place	Lane	Nation	Swimmers	Time	Notes
1	4	Singapore	Lynette Lim; Amanda Lim; Mylene Ong; Quah Ting Wen	3:45.73	GR
2	7	Thailand		3:48.09	
3	5	Malaysia		3:51.40	
4	6	Philippines		3:56.20	
5	3	Indonesia		3:59.75	
6	2	Laos		5:12.91	
