= Swimming at the 2009 SEA Games – Women's 4 × 100 metre medley relay =

Women's 4x100 swimming game

The Women's 4x100 Medley Relay swimming event at the 2009 SEA Games was held on December 13, 2009. The team from Singapore won the event.

== Results ==
=== Final ===
Place	Lane	Nation	Swimmers	Time	Notes
1	4	Singapore	Roanne Ho; Shana Lim; Quah Ting Wen; Tao Li	4:10.38	GR
2		Malaysia		4:13.18	
3		Thailand	Chavisa Thaveesupsoonthorn; Phiangkhwan Pawapotako; Natnapa Prommuenwai; Natthanan Junkrajang	4:19.89	

Note: Results appear to be incomplete (i.e. there were most likely more than 3 teams in the final).
