= Chui Lai Kwan =

Malaysian swimmer (born 1990)

Personal information
- Full name: Chui Lai Kwan
- Born: 3 June 1990 (age 36) Sabah, Malaysia
- Height: 5 ft 6 in (168 cm)
- Weight: 152 lb (69 kg)

Sport
- Sport: Swimming
- Strokes: Freestyle
- Coach: Marilyn Chua
Medal record
Women's swimming
Representing Malaysia
SEA Games
Gold medal – first place	2007 Nakhon Ratchasima	50 m freestyle
Silver medal – second place	2005 Laguna	100 m backstroke
Silver medal – second place	2009 Vientiane	4×100 m medley
Bronze medal – third place	2003 Hanoi	50 m freestyle
Bronze medal – third place	2009 Vientiane	50 m freestyle
Bronze medal – third place	2009 Vientiane	100 m backstroke
Bronze medal – third place	2009 Vientiane	4×100 m freestyle

Chui Lai Kwan (born 3 June 1990) is a former competitive swimmer on the national Malaysian swim team.

She left the Malaysian national team in 2011 after a dispute with the Amateur Swimming Union of Malaysia (ASUM), after the 2011 Summer Universiade in Shenzhen.

== Swimming career ==
At the 2014 Commonwealth Games in Glasgow, Scotland, Kwan ranked fifteenth in the 50-meter freestyle with a time of 26:00. She also placed seventeenth in the 50-meter freestyle (57:60).
