= James Walsh (swimmer) =

American-born competition swimmer (born 1986)

James Walsh OLY
Personal information
- Full name: James Bernard Remandaban Walsh
- Nickname: "J.B."
- National team: Philippines
- Born: December 23, 1986 (age 39) Virginia Beach, Virginia, United States
- Height: 5 ft 8 in (1.73 m)
- Weight: 154 lb (70 kg)

Sport
- Sport: Swimming
- Strokes: Butterfly
- Club: Tidewater Aquatic Club
- College team: University of Florida (U.S.)
Medal record
Southeast Asian Games
| Gold medal – first place | 2007 Nakhon Ratchasima | 200m butterfly |
| Gold medal – first place | 2007 Nakhon Ratchasima | 4x100m medley relay |
| Silver medal – second place | 2005 Manila | 200m butterfly |
| Silver medal – second place | 2007 Nakhon Ratchasima | 100m butterfly |
| Silver medal – second place | 2007 Nakhon Ratchasima | 4x100m freestyle relay |
| Bronze medal – third place | 2005 Manila | 4x100m medley relay |
| Bronze medal – third place | 2009 Vientiane | 4x100m medley relay |

James Bernard "J.B." Remandaban Walsh (born December 23, 1986) is an American-born competition swimmer who represented the Philippines in the 2004 and 2008 Summer Olympics.

Walsh accepted an athletic scholarship to attend the University of Florida in Gainesville, Florida, where he swam for coach Gregg Troy's Florida Gators swimming and diving team in National Collegiate Athletic Association (NCAA) competition from 2004 to 2008. Walsh graduated from the University of Florida with a bachelor's degree in exercise and sports science in 2008.

Walsh is the Filipino national record holder in the 200-meter butterfly.

== See also ==
- Florida Gators
- List of University of Florida alumni
- List of University of Florida Olympians
