= Heidi Gan =

Malaysian swimmer (born 1988)

Personal information
- Full name: Heidi Gan
- Nationality: Malaysia
- Born: 8 October 1988 (age 38) Adelaide, South Australia, Australia
- Height: 5 ft 5 in (1.65 m)
- Weight: 121 lb (55 kg)

Chinese name
- Simplified Chinese: 颜海蒂
- Traditional Chinese: 顏海蒂
- Hanyu Pinyin: Yán Hǎidì
- Hokkien POJ: Gân Háitì

Sport
- Sport: Swimming
- Strokes: Long distance
Medal record
Representing Malaysia
SEA Games
Gold medal – first place	2017 Kuala Lumpur	10km open water
Silver medal – second place	2007 Nakhon Ratchasima	4x100m freestyle relay
Bronze medal – third place	2007 Nakhon Ratchasima	4x200m freestyle relay

Heidi Gan (born 8 October 1988) is a Malaysian distance swimmer. At the 2012 Summer Olympics, she competed in the Women's marathon 10 kilometre, finishing in 16th place. In the same event, she finished in 21st place at the 2016 Summer Olympics.
