= Russell Ong =

Singaporean swimmer

Personal information
- Height: 178 cm (5 ft 10 in)

Sport
- Sport: Swimming
Medal record
Representing Singapore
SEA Games
Gold medal – first place	2007 Nakhon Ratchasima	4x100m freestyle relay
Gold medal – first place	2009 Vientiane	4x100m freestyle relay
Gold medal – first place	2011 Palembang	4x100m freestyle relay
Silver medal – second place	2009 Vientiane	4x100m medley relay
Silver medal – second place	2013 Naypyidaw	50m freestyle
Bronze medal – third place	2007 Nakhon Ratchasima	50m freestyle
Bronze medal – third place	2009 Vientiane	50m freestyle
Bronze medal – third place	2009 Vientiane	100m freestyle
Bronze medal – third place	2011 Palembang	50m freestyle

Russell Ong is a former competitive swimmer, actor and businessman from Singapore. Ong won a total of nine medals at the Southeast Asian Games and was Captain of Team Singapore Swimming. After retirement from swimming, Ong acted for Mediacorp's Channel 5 and hosted a Channel NewsAsia travelogue. Ong later co-founded a Shanghai-based tech start-up and became its Chief Financial Officer.

== Education ==
Ong studied at Anglo-Chinese School (Independent). He previously studied at University of Melbourne but gave up his studies there after returning to Singapore. Ong resumed his studies in Singapore Management University.

== Career ==
=== Swimming career ===
Ong won bronze medals in the 50m freestyle event at the 2007, 2009 and the 2011 Southeast Asian Games, as well as a silver at the 2013 Southeast Asian Games.

In 2014, Ong became the chairman of the Athletes' Commission of the Singapore Swimming Association.

In August 2015, Ong announced retirement from swimming after failing to qualify for the 2015 Southeast Asian Games.

=== Media career ===
In 2012, Ong starred in a Singaporean horror film, Ghost Child.

Ong starred in Mediacorp's Channel 5's drama series Lion Moms, and hosted Channel NewsAsia travelogue, Luxe Asia 4, showing lifestyles of Asia’s rich and famous people and expensive locations.

=== Financial career ===
Ong is also the co-founder and Chief Financial Officer of a Shanghai-based tech start-up.
