= Daniel Coakley (swimmer) =

Filipino-American swimmer (born 1989)

Personal information
- Full name: Daniel Kailikoa Coakley
- Nickname: Zane
- Nationality: Filipino-American
- Born: December 13, 1989 (age 36) Hilo, Hawaii, United States
- Height: 1.85 m (6 ft 1 in)
- Weight: 79 kg (174 lb)

Sport
- Sport: Swimming
- Club: General Santos Warrior Aquatics (Philippines), Warrior Aquatics (USA)
Medal record
Representing Philippines
Southeast Asian Games
| Gold medal – first place | 2007 Nakhon Ratchasima | 50 m freestyle |
| Gold medal – first place | 2007 Nakhon Ratchasima | 4×100 m medley |
| Silver medal – second place | 2007 Nakhon Ratchasima | 4×100 m freestyle |

Daniel Zane Coakley (born December 13, 1989) is a Filipino-American swimmer who won two gold medals and a silver medal at the 2007 Southeast Asian Games. He competed in the 50 m freestyle at the 2008 Olympics, but failed to reach the final. Coakley is a great-grandson of Olympic medalist in swimming Teófilo Yldefonso.
