= Leung Chii Lin =

Malaysian swimmer

Personal information
- Full name: Eileen Nicole Leung Chii Lin
- National team: Malaysia
- Born: 11 February 1991 (age 35) Sabah, Malaysia
- Height: 1.60 m (5 ft 3 in)
- Weight: 50 kg (110 lb)

Sport
- Sport: Swimming
- Strokes: Freestyle
- Club: University of Malaya
Medal record
Women's swimming
Representing Malaysia
Southeast Asian Games
Silver medal – second place	2007 Bangkok	50 m freestyle
Silver medal – second place	2007 Bangkok	4×100 m freestyle
Bronze medal – third place	2009 Vientiane	4×100 m freestyle

Chinese name
- Traditional Chinese: 梁綺冷
- Simplified Chinese: 梁绮冷
- Hanyu Pinyin: Liáng Qǐlěng
- Pha̍k-fa-sṳ: Liòng Khí-lâng
- Jyutping: Loeng4 Ji2 Laang5
- Hokkien POJ: Niô͘ Khí-léng
- Tâi-lô: Niôo Khí-líng

Eileen Nicole Leung Chii Lin (born 11 February 1991) is a Malaysian retired competitive swimmer, who specialised in sprint freestyle events. She represented Malaysia at the 2008 Summer Olympics, and has won a career total of three medals (two silver and one bronze) in an international competition, spanning two editions of the Southeast Asian Games (2007 and 2009).

Leung competed as a member of the Malaysian swimming squad in the women's 50 m freestyle at the 2008 Summer Olympics in Beijing. Leading up to the Games, she smashed a national record and a FINA B-cut time of 26.18 seconds at the Malaysian Open Championships in Bukit Jalil. Leung rounded out the field in heat eight out of twelve to last place and forty-eighth overall with a 26.75, just 0.57 seconds off her entry standard. Besides that, Leung has also held the 4 × 100 m Freestyle Relay Malaysia national records of 3.51.40 seconds.

Leung successes have earned her Sabah Most Promising Sportswomen Award in 2005, and Sabah Sport Women Award in 2008.

== Personal life ==
Leung was born in Kota Kinabalu, Sabah. She began swimming at the age of 4 and began her training at the age of 7. Leung was pursuing her high school at SMK Lok Yuk, Kota Kinabalu, and during the same time, she was representing the state swimmer team and won a lot of states and even national award. After her high school, Leung was invited to join the national swimming team and offer her to continue her study at National Sports School, KL, and she began to represent the country to participates in a variety of national and international competition. Leung was continuing her study at University Malaya, KL after completed her pre-u, and she was appointed as the University Malaya Swimming Team's Coach in 2013 to 2014. Leung success graduated as the first-class honor of her Degree in Sport Management in 2016. During 2013, Leung begins her coach journey, she been appointing as a swimming team coach for Royal Selangor Golf Club and Garden International School, Kuala Lumpur. Besides that, Leung is also the founder and head coach of Trinity Swimming Academy and Swim Splash Academy.

In December 2018, she married fellow Malaysian Olympian Yu Peng Kean. The couple's first child, a daughter, was born in September 2020.

== Swimming achievements ==
- Pre-2008: Gold medalist and meet record holder in SUKMA year 2006; overall champion in MSSM year 2002, 2005, 2007; overall champion in National Age Group in year 2003
- 2008: Competed in Olympic Games, Beijing;
- 2009: Medallist in SEA Games, Vientiane; competed in World Swimming Championship, Barcelona
- 2010: Competed in Asian Games, Guangzhou; competed in Commonwealth Games, New Delhi
- 2011: Competed in World Summer Universiade Games, Shenzhen; medallist in SEA Games, Palembang
- 2013: Competed in World Summer Universiade Games, Kazan

== Honors and awards ==
Personal Award

2008: Sabah Sport Women Award

2005: Sabah Most Promising Sportswomen Award

Personal Best: Malaysia National Record

2009: 4 × 100 m Freestyle Relay 3.51.40s

2008: 50m Freestyle 26.18s
