= Ryan Arabejo =

Filipino swimmer (born 1989)

Ryan Arabejo OLY
Personal information
- Full name: Ryan Paolo Aguinalde Arabejo
- National team: Philippines
- Born: October 30, 1989 (age 36)

Sport
- Sport: Swimming
- Strokes: backstroke, freestyle
- College team: Drury University (USA) (2010–2013)
Medal record
Southeast Asian Games
Gold medal – first place	2007 Thailand	200 back
Gold medal – first place	2007 Thailand	1500m free
Gold medal – first place	2007 Thailand	4x100 medley relay
Gold medal – first place	2009 Vientiane	1500m free
Silver medal – second place	2009 Vientiane	200m back
Silver medal – second place	2009 Vientiane	4x200m free relay
Silver medal – second place	2009 Vientiane	400m free
Bronze medal – third place	2005 Philippines	1500m free
Bronze medal – third place	2007 Thailand	400m free
Bronze medal – third place	2009 Vientiane	4x100 medley relay
Bronze medal – third place	2011 Indonesia	4x200 free relay
Bronze medal – third place	2011 Indonesia	1500m free

Ryan Paolo Aguinalde Arabejo (born October 30, 1989) is a swimmer and coach from the Philippines. He swam for the Philippines at the 2008 Olympics.

He has swum for the Philippines at the:

- Olympics: 2008
- World Championships: 2007
- Asian Games: 2006, 2010
- Southeast Asian Games (SEA Games): 2005, 2007, 2009, 2011

Beginning in the 2010–11 school year, Arabejo attends and swims for the USA's Drury University in Springfield, Missouri.
