= Hem Thon Ponleu =

Olympic swimmer

Personal information
- Born: January 26, 1990 (age 36) Phnom Penh, Cambodia

Sport
- Sport: Swimming

Hem Thon Ponleu (born 26 January 1990) is a Cambodian freestyle swimmer. He competed at the 2008 Summer Olympics and 2012 Summer Olympics. His niece Hem Thon Vitiny also swam in both Olympics.

== See also ==
- Cambodia at the 2012 Summer Olympics
