= Vietnam at the 2009 SEA Games =

Vietnam at the 2009 Southeast Asian Games
- IOC code: VIE
- NOC: Vietnam Olympic Committee
- Website: www.voc.org.vn (in Vietnamese and English)

in Vientiane
- Flag bearer: Nguyen Trong Cuong (Taekwondo)
- Medals Ranked 2nd: Gold 83 Silver 75 Bronze 57 Total 215

Southeast Asian Games appearances (overview)
- 1989; 1991; 1993; 1995; 1997; 1999; 2001; 2003; 2005; 2007; 2009; 2011; 2013; 2015; 2017; 2019; 2021; 2023; 2025; 2027; 2029

Vietnam participated in the 2009 Southeast Asian Games in the city of Vientiane, Laos, from 9 December 2009 to 18 December 2009. They won 83 gold, 75 silver, and 57 bronze medals. They came second overall in Nation Ranking.
