= Swimming at the 2009 SEA Games – Men's 200 metre individual medley =

Swimming – Men's 200 metre individual medley at the 2009 SEA Games
- Date: 11 December 2009
- Winning time: 2:03.68

Medalists
gold medal	Miguel Molina	Philippines
silver medal	Nuttapong Ketin	Thailand
bronze medal	Joshua Lim	Singapore

The Men's 200 Individual Medley (or "I.M.") swimming event at the 2009 SEA Games was held on December 11, 2009. Miguel Molina of the Philippines won the event.

== Results ==
=== Final ===
Place	Swimmer	Nation	Time	Notes
1st place, gold medalist(s)	Miguel Molina	Philippines	2:03.68	
2nd place, silver medalist(s)	Nuttapong Ketin	Thailand	2:04.17	
3rd place, bronze medalist(s)	Joshua Lim	Singapore	2:05.33	
4	Sheng Jun Pang	Singapore	2:06.60	
5	Akbar Nasution	Indonesia	2:06.97	
6	Robert Walsh	Philippines	2:08.41	
7	Melvin Chua	Malaysia	2:09.68	
8	Radomyos Matjiur	Thailand	2:10.97	

=== Preliminary heats ===
Rank	Heat/Lane	Swimmer	Nation	Time	Notes
1	H2 L?	Nuttapong Ketin	Thailand	2:08.68	Q
2	H2 L?	Sheng Jun Pang	Singapore	2:09.08	Q
3	H2 L?	Robert Walsh	Philippines	2:09.80	Q
4	H1 L?	Miguel Molina	Philippines	2:09.60	Q
5	H1 L?	Joshua Lim	Singapore	2:09.80	Q
6	H1 L?	Radomyos Matjiur	Thailand	2:09.86	Q
7	H1 L?	Akbar Nasution	Indonesia	2:10.17	Q
8	H2 L?	Melvin Chua	Malaysia	2:10.80	Q
9	H1 L?	Nguoc Quang Bao N	Vietnam	2:12.56	
10	H2 L?	Idham M Dasuki	Indonesia	2:12.97	
11	H2 L?	Ian James Barr	Malaysia	2:15.05	
12	H1 L?	Hem Thonponloeu	Cambodia	2:33.01	
13	H1 L?	Van Ty Nguyen	Vietnam	2:34.83	
14	H2 L?	Maximov Chamraen Y	Cambodia	2:37.66	
15	H2 L?	T Thepphitack	Laos	2:49.53	
16	H1 L?	S Sergey	Laos	2:59.09	
