= Swimming at the 2009 SEA Games – Men's 400 metre individual medley =

Swimming – Men's 400 metre individual medley at the 2009 SEA Games
- Date: 10 December 2009
- Winning time: 4:27.00

Medalists
gold medal	Miguel Molina	Philippines
silver medal	Nuttapong Ketin	Thailand
bronze medal	Võ Thái Nguyên	Vietnam

The Men's 400 Individual Medley swimming event at the 25th SEA Games was held on December 10, 2009. This even was swum as a timed-final (i.e. swimmers only swam the race once). Miguel Molina of the Philippines won the event.

== Results ==
=== Final ===
Place	Swimmer	Nation	Time	Notes
1st place, gold medalist(s)	Miguel Molina	Philippines	4:27.00	
2nd place, silver medalist(s)	Nuttapong Ketin	Thailand	4:27.57	
3rd place, bronze medalist(s)	Võ Thái Nguyên	Vietnam	4:30.78	
4	Sheng Jun Pang	Singapore	4:32.44	
5	Akbar Nasution	Indonesia	4:34.24	
6	Melvin Chua	Malaysia	4:35.39	
7	Jose Gonzales	Philippines	4:39.00	
8	Wei Ming Ho	Singapore	4:44.97	
9	Idham Dasuki	Indonesia	4:48.29	
10	Nithipanya A	Thailand	5:28.92	
-	Van Ty Nguyen	Vietnam	DQ	
