= Billiards and snooker at the 2009 SEA Games =

Billiards and Snooker at the 2009 SEA Games

Billiards and snooker were held at the 2009 SEA Games at Convention Hall, Don Chan Palace, Vientiane, Laos.

== Medal tally ==
Rank	Nation	Gold	Silver	Bronze	Total
1	Philippines (PHI)	3	1	2	6
2	Vietnam (VIE)	3	1	0	4
3	Singapore (SIN)	2	1	2	5
4	Thailand (THA)	2	0	3	5
5	Indonesia (INA)	0	3	2	5
6	Malaysia (MAS)	0	2	1	3
7	Myanmar (MYA)	0	2	0	2
Totals (7 entries)		10	10	10	30

== Medalists ==
=== Men ===
Event	Gold	Silver	Bronze
8-ball pool singles	Ronato Alcano; Philippines	Gandy Valle; Philippines	Ricky Yang; Indonesia
9-ball pool singles	Nguyễn Phúc Long; Vietnam	Ricky Yang; Indonesia	Dennis Orcollo; Philippines
9-ball pool doubles	Vietnam; Đỗ Hoàng Quân; Lương Chí Dũng	Indonesia; Muhammad Zulfikri; Ricky Yang	Singapore; Chan Keng Kwang; Toh Lian Han
Snooker singles	Supoj Saenla; Thailand	Thor Chuan Leong; Malaysia	Noppadon Noppachor; Thailand
Snooker doubles	Singapore; Ang Bon Chin; Lim Chun Kiat	Malaysia; Thor Chuan Leong; Chee Wei Lai	Thailand; Issara Kachaiwong; Phaitoon Phonbun
Carom cushion	Đặng Đình Tiến; Vietnam	Cao Thành Trúc; Vietnam	Tan Kiong An; Indonesia
English billiards singles	Peter Gilchrist; Singapore	Kyaw Oo; Myanmar	Thawat Surajitthurakarn; Thailand
English billiards doubles	Thailand; Praput Chaithanasakun; Thawat Surajitthurakarn	Myanmar; Kyaw Oo; Aung Htay	Singapore; Peter Gilchrist; Lim Chun Kiat

=== Women ===
Event	Gold	Silver	Bronze
8-ball pool singles	Rubilen Amit; Philippines	Angeline Magdalena Ticoalu; Indonesia	Esther S.Y. Kwan; Malaysia
9-ball pool singles	Rubilen Amit; Philippines	Charlene Chai; Singapore	Iris Ranola; Philippines

== Men's events ==
=== Singles snooker ===
Preliminary round
(Singapore) Lim Chun Kiat	4
(Myanmar) Ye Zaw Htut	2
(Vietnam) Nguyen Anh Tuan	4
(Philippines) Alex Pagulayan	0
(Laos) Daophachan	2
(Thailand) Noppadon Noppachorn	4
(Malaysia) Chee Wei Lai	4
(Philippines) Carlo Biado	0
(Laos) Sidthidead	4
(Myanmar) Arkar Soe Yun	1
(Vietnam) Pham Hoai Nam	1
(Singapore) Ang Bon Chin	4

Quarterfinals
(Malaysia) Thor Chuan Leong	4
(Singapore) Lim Chun Kiat	0
(Vietnam) Nguyen Anh Tuan	0
(Thailand) Noppadon Noppachorn	4
(Malaysia) Chee Wei Lai	2
(Laos) Sidthidead	4
(Singapore) Ang Bon Chin	1
(Thailand) Supoj Saenla	4

Semifinals
(Malaysia) Thor Chuan Leong	4
(Thailand) Noppadon Noppachorn	2
(Laos) Sidthidead	3
(Thailand) Supoj Saenla	4

Gold medal game
(Malaysia) Thor Chuan Leong	3
(Thailand) Supoj Saenla	4
Bronze medal game
(Laos) Sidthidead	2
(Thailand) Noppadon Noppachorn	4

=== Doubles snooker ===
Quarterfinals
(Vietnam) Do Hoang Quan/Luong Chi Duong	2
(Singapore) Ang Bon Chin/Lim Chun Kiat	3
(Philippines) Roberto Gomez/Carlo Biado	3
(Laos) Sidthidead/Khamsai Deathavong	2
(Myanmar) Ye Zaw Htut/Arkar Soe Yin	1
(Malaysia) Thor Chuan Leong/Chee Wei Lai	3

Semifinals
(Thailand) Issara Kachaiwong/Phaithoon Phonbun	0
(Singapore) Ang Bon Chin/Lim Chun Kiat	3
(Philippines) Roberto Gomez/Carlo Biado	0
(Malaysia) Thor Chuan Leong/Chee Wei Lai	3

Gold medal game
(Singapore) Ang Bon Chin/Lim Chun Kiat	3
(Malaysia) Thor Chuan Leong/Chee Wei Lai	0
Bronze medal game
(Thailand) Issara Kachaiwong/Phaithoon Phonbun	3
(Philippines) Roberto Gomez/Carlo Biado	1

=== Single English billiards ===
Preliminary round
(Vietnam) Nguyen Thanh Long	2
(Myanmar) Pauk Sa	3
(Singapore) Peter Gilchrist	3
(Laos) Phaibun Sisurad	1
(Philippines) Efren Reyes	1
(Malaysia) Moh Loon Hong	3
(Laos) Suleya	3
(Malaysia) Yew Wah Chooi	2
(Vietnam) Nguyen Trung Kien	3
(Philippines) Reynaldo Grandea	0

Quarterfinals
(Thailand) Praput Chaithansakun	3
(Myanmar) Pauk Sa	2
(Singapore) Peter Gilchrist	3
(Malaysia) Moh Loon Hong	1
(Myanmar) Kyaw Oo	3
(Laos) Suleya	1
(Vietnam) Nguyen Trung Kien	1
(Thailand) Thawat Surajitthurakarn	3

Semifinals
(Thailand) Praput Chaithansakun	2
(Singapore) Peter Gilchrist	3
(Myanmar) Kyaw Oo	3
(Thailand) Thawat Surajitthurakarn	0

Gold medal game
(Singapore) Peter Gilchrist	3
(Myanmar) Kyaw Oo	1
Bronze medal game
(Thailand) Praput Chaithansakun	2
(Thailand) Thawat Surajitthurakarn	3

=== Doubles English billiards ===
Quarterfinals
(Singapore) Peter Gilchrist/Lim Chun Kiat	3
(Vietnam) Nguyen Thanh Long/Nguyen Trung Kien	1
(Thailand) Praput Chaithansakun/Thawat Surajitthurakarn	3
(Philippines) Reynaldo Grandea/Warren Kiamco	0
(Laos) Phaibun Sisurad/Suleya	2
(Malaysia) Moh Loon Hong/Yew Wah Chooi	3

Semifinals
(Myanmar) Kyaw Oo/Aung Htay	3
(Singapore) Peter Gilchrist/Lim Chun Kiat	3
(Thailand) Praput Chaithansakun/Thawat Surajitthurakarn	3
(Malaysia) Moh Loon Hong/Yew Wah Chooi	0

Gold medal game
(Myanmar) Kyaw Oo/Aung Htay	1
(Thailand) Praput Chaithansakun/Thawat Surajitthurakarn	3
Bronze medal game
(Singapore) Peter Gilchrist/Lim Chun Kyat	3
(Malaysia) Moh Loon Hong/Yew Wah Chooi	0

=== Singles cushion caroms ===
Preliminary round
(Laos) Bunhead Tanvan	36
(Myanmar) Aunh Htay	63
(Thailand) Udon Khaimuk	26
(Laos) Somxav Xaisanan	36
(Philippines) Reynaldo Grandea	85
(Myanmar) Aung San Oo	39

Quarterfinals
(Vietnam) Dang Dinh Tien	100
(Thailand) Praput Chaithansakun	44
(Myanmar) Aung Htay	50
(Philippines) Rodolfo Luat	60
(Indonesia) Tan Kiong An	67
(Laos) Somxav Xaisanan	26
(Vietnam) Cao Tranh Truc	100
(Philippines) Reynaldo Grandea	49

Semifinals
(Vietnam) Dang Dinh Tien	100
(Philippines) Rodolfo Luat	50
(Indonesia) Tan Kiong An	72
(Vietnam) Cao Tranh Truc	100

Gold medal game
(Vietnam) Dang Dinh Tien	100
(Vietnam) Cao Tranh Truc	59
Bronze medal game
(Philippines) Rodolfo Luat	94
(Indonesia) Tan Kiong An	99

=== Singles 8-ball ===
Preliminary round
(Vietnam) Phan Hoang	7
(Malaysia) Lee Poh Soon	4
(Indonesia) Ricky Yang	7
(Laos) Hongsavade	0
(Singapore) Toh Lian Han	2
(Thailand) Surathep Phoochalam	7
(Malaysia) Ibrahim Amir	7
(Indonesia) Wieto Siauw	4
(Philippines) Ronato Alcano	7
(Laos) Phonpased	2
(Thailand) Dechawat Poomjaeng	7
(Vietnam) Lim Leng	4

Quarterfinals
(Philippines) Gandy Valle	7
(Vietnam) Phan Hoang	5
(Indonesia) Ricky Yang	7
(Thailand) Surathep Phoochalam	0
(Malaysia) Ibrahim Amir	5
(Philippines) Ronato Alcano	7
(Thailand) Dechawat Poomjaeng	7
(Singapore) Tey Chun Kiat	3

Semifinals
(Philippines) Gandy Valle	7
(Indonesia) Ricky Yang	1
(Philippines) Ronato Alcano	7
(Thailand) Dechawat Poomjaeng	3

Gold medal game
(Philippines) Gandy Valle	1
(Philippines) Ronato Alcano	7
Bronze medal game
(Indonesia) Ricky Yang	7
(Thailand) Dechawat Poomjaeng	1

=== Singles 9-ball ===
Preliminary round
(Indonesia) Ricky Yang	9
(Singapore) Toh Lian Han	6
(Laos) Phonpadid	9
(Brunei) Al-Muhtadee Billah	6
(Vietnam) Do Hoang Quan	5
(Malaysia) Ibrahim Amir	7
(Thailand) Nitiwat Kanjansari	9
(Philippines) Ramil Gallego	6
(Singapore) Chan Keng Kwang	7
(Laos) Hongsavade	9
(Vietnam) Nguyen Phuc Long	9
(Thailand) Surathep Phoochalam	6
(Malaysia) Lee Poh Soon	1
(Indonesia) Muhammad Bewi Simanjuntak	9
(Brunei) Teo Chee Soon	5
(Philippines) Dennis Orcollo	9

Quarterfinals
(Indonesia) Ricky Yang	9
(Laos) Phonpadid	1
(Malaysia) Ibrahim Amir	9
(Thailand) Nitiwat Kanjansari	6
(Laos) Hongsavade	4
(Vietnam) Nguyen Phoc Long	9
(Indonesia) Muhammad Bewi Simanjuntak	3
(Philippines) Dennis Orcollo	9

Semifinals
(Indonesia) Ricky Yang	9
(Malaysia) Ibrahim Amir	6
(Vietnam) Nguyen Phoc Long	9
(Philippines) Dennis Orcollo	8

Gold medal game
(Indonesia) Ricky Yang	1
(Vietnam) Nguyen Phuc Long	9
Bronze medal game
(Malaysia) Ibrahim Amir	3
(Philippines) Dennis Orcollo	9

=== Doubles 9-ball ===
Quarterfinals
(Philippines) Francisco Bustamante/Efren Reyes	4
(Thailand) Nitiwat Kanjansari/Surathep Phoochalam	7
(Brunei) Al-Muhtadee Billah/Teo Chee Soon	3
(Vietnam) Do Hoang Quan/Luong Chi Dung	7
(Malaysia) Ibrahim Amir/Lee Poh Soon	2
(Indonesia) Ricky Yang/Muhammad Zulfikri	7
(Laos) Hongsavade/Phopadid	4
(Singapore) Chan Keng Kwang/Toh Lian Han	7

Semifinals
(Thailand) Nitiwat Kanjansari/Surathep Phoochalam	4
(Vietnam) Do Hoang Quan/Luong Chi Dung	7
(Indonesia) Ricky Yang/Muhammad Zulfikri	7
(Singapore) Chan Keng Kwang/Toh Lian Han	4

Gold medal game
(Vietnam) Do Hoang Quan/Luong Chi Dung	7
(Indonesia) Ricky Yang/Muhammad Zulfikri	3
Bronze medal game
(Thailand) Nitiwat Kanjansari/Surathep Phoochalam	2
(Singapore) Chan Keng Kwang/Toh Lian Han	7

== Women's events ==
=== Singles 8-ball ===
Preliminary round
(Vietnam) Vuong Thi Thu Binh	5
(Laos) Suvanid Saedoude	4
(Thailand) Kampa Tala	4
(Philippines) Mary Ann Basas	5
(Malaysia) Esther S. Y. Kwan	5
(Singapore) Charlene Chai	2
(Malaysia) Joanne Suhana	5
(Laos) Viensavan	3
(Indonesia) Sri Wahyuni	0
(Vietnam) Duong Thuy Vi	5

Quarterfinals
(Indonesia) Angeline M. Ticoal	5
(Vietnam) Vuong Thi Thu Binh	2
(Philippines) Mary Ann Basas	4
(Malaysia) Esther S.Y. Kwan	5
(Philippines) Rubilen Amit	5
(Malaysia) Joanna Suhana	4
(Vietnam) Duong Thuy Vi	5
(Thailand) Santhinee Jaisuekul	4

Semifinals
(Indonesia) Angeline M. Ticoal	5
(Malaysia) Esther S.Y. Kwan	2
(Philippines) Rubilen Amit	5
(Vietnam) Duong Thuy Vi	2

Gold medal game
(Indonesia) Angeline M. Ticoal	1
(Philippines) Rubilen Amit	5
Bronze medal game
(Malaysia) Eshter S.Y. Kwan	5
(Vietnam) Duong Thuy Vi	4

=== Singles 9-ball ===
Preliminary round
(Malaysia) Esther S.Y. Kwan	7
(Thailand) P. Nicha	5
(Laos) Viensavan	7
(Indonesia) Panny Lestari	6
(Vietnam) Duong Thuy Vi	4
(Singapore) Charlene Chai	7
(Philippines) Rubilen Amit	7
(Laos) Suvanid Saedoude	1
(Vietnam) Doan Thu Ngoc Le	7
(Malaysia) Joanna Suhana	5

Quarterfinals
(Philippines) Iris Ranola	7
(Malaysia) Esther S.Y. Kwan	5
(Laos) Viensavan	5
(Singapore) Charlene Chai	7
(Thailand) Santhinee Jaisuekul	1
(Philippines) Rubilen Amit	7
(Vietnam) Doan Thi Ngoc Le	5
(Indonesia) Angeline M. Ticoal	7

Semifinals
(Philippines) Iris Ranola	6
(Singapore) Charlene Chai	7
(Philippines) Rubilen Amit	7
(Indonesia) Angeline M. Ticoal	3

Gold medal game
(Singapore) Charlene Chai	3
(Philippines) Rubilen Amit	7
Bronze medal game
(Philippines) Iris Ranola	7
(Indonesia) Angeline M. Ticoal	2
