= Pencak silat at the 2009 SEA Games =

Pencak Silat at the 2009 SEA Games was held at Hall 3, Lao international Trade Exhibition and Convention Center, Vientiane, Laos between December 12 and 17, 2009.

== Medal summary ==
* Host nation (Laos)

Rank	Nation	Gold	Silver	Bronze	Total
1	Vietnam (VIE)	6	4	1	11
2	Malaysia (MAS)	4	0	6	10
3	Thailand (THA)	2	4	4	10
4	Indonesia (INA)	2	3	3	8
5	Singapore (SIN)	1	2	5	8
6	Laos (LAO)*	1	2	4	7
7	Brunei (BRU)	1	0	3	4
8	Myanmar (MYA)	0	1	1	2
8	Philippines (PHI)	0	1	1	2
Totals (9 entries)		17	17	28	62

== Medalists ==
The results of individual competitions at the games are as follows:

=== Artistic ===
Event	Gold	Silver	Bronze
Men's singles	Khairul Bahrin Duraman; Brunei	Sarawut Comepoon; Thailand	Youthisinh Phoutthalaksa; Laos
Women's singles	Rabiatul Adawiyah Yusak; Singapore	Vũ Thị Thảo; Vietnam	Ni Luh Putu Spyanawati; Indonesia
Men's doubles	Indonesia; Hamdani; Mochamad Yusuf Effendi	Vietnam; Nguyễn Thanh Tùng; Trần Đức Nghĩa	Malaysia; Mohamad Hafiz Ariff; Muhamad Helmi Abd Aziz

=== Tarung ===
==== Men ====
Event	Gold	Silver	Bronze
Class A 45–50 kg	Mohd Hafiz Mahari; Malaysia	Okhe Botsavang; Laos	Amirul Ahat; Brunei
Class A 45–50 kg	Mohd Hafiz Mahari; Malaysia	Okhe Botsavang; Laos	Niphon Jantaro; Thailand
Class B 50–55 kg	Nanthachai Khansakhon; Thailand	Trần Văn Toàn; Vietnam	Thitsaphone; Laos
Class B 50–55 kg	Nanthachai Khansakhon; Thailand	Trần Văn Toàn; Vietnam	Shuhairi Chin; Malaysia
Class C 55–60 kg	Nguyễn Bá Trình; Vietnam	Pujo Janoko; Indonesia	Mohd Islahidayat Ismail; Malaysia
Class C 55–60 kg	Nguyễn Bá Trình; Vietnam	Pujo Janoko; Indonesia	Prasit Warlam; Thailand
Class D 60–65 kg	Chaiwat Nimma; Thailand	Muhammad Sodik; Indonesia	Khuzaiman Ahmad; Brunei
Class D 60–65 kg	Chaiwat Nimma; Thailand	Muhammad Sodik; Indonesia	Saifullah Julaimi; Singapore
Class E 65–70 kg	I Komang Wahyu Purbayasari; Indonesia	Min Swe; Myanmar	Saifuddin Julaimi; Singapore
Class E 65–70 kg	I Komang Wahyu Purbayasari; Indonesia	Min Swe; Myanmar	Sanchai Chomphupuang; Thailand
Class F 70–75 kg	Mohd Fauzi bin Khalid; Malaysia	Trương Văn Mạo; Vietnam	Marniel Dimla; Philippines
Class F 70–75 kg	Mohd Fauzi bin Khalid; Malaysia	Trương Văn Mạo; Vietnam	El Yasak Said; Singapore
Class G 75–80 kg	Vũ Thế Hoàng; Vietnam	Muhammad Shakir Juanda; Singapore	Freddy Ashrol Choo; Brunei
Class H 80–85 kg	Faizal Abdullah; Malaysia	Chanon Untakool; Thailand	Shafiq Saiful; Singapore
Class H 80–85 kg	Faizal Abdullah; Malaysia	Chanon Untakool; Thailand	Nguyễn Thanh Quyền; Vietnam
Class I 85–90 kg	Pheumthavy Vongphackdy; Laos	Nur Habir Isnani; Philippines	not awarded

==== Women ====
Event	Gold	Silver	Bronze
Class A 45–50 kg	Lê Thị Phi Nga; Vietnam	Boutsady Soudavong; Laos	Noor Farahana Ismail; Malaysia
Class A 45–50 kg	Lê Thị Phi Nga; Vietnam	Boutsady Soudavong; Laos	Nyein Nyein Aung; Myanmar
Class B 50–55 kg	Huỳnh Thị Thu Hồng; Vietnam	Dinniyati Julaimi; Singapore	Kesone; Laos
Class B 50–55 kg	Huỳnh Thị Thu Hồng; Vietnam	Dinniyati Julaimi; Singapore	Malini Mohamad; Malaysia
Class C 55–60 kg	Emy Latip; Malaysia	Jutarat Noytapa; Thailand	Anissa Pangestina; Indonesia
Class C 55–60 kg	Emy Latip; Malaysia	Jutarat Noytapa; Thailand	Saiedah Said; Singapore
Class D 60–65 kg	Nguyễn Thị Phương Thuý; Vietnam	Ni Nyoman Suparniti; Indonesia	Bouaphay Vongkhamsone; Laos
Class D 60–65 kg	Nguyễn Thị Phương Thuý; Vietnam	Ni Nyoman Suparniti; Indonesia	Jongdee Hemkaeo; Thailand
Class E 65–70 kg	Lê Thị Hồng Ngoan; Vietnam	Monruthai Bangsalad; Thailand	Sofani Rakhmawati; Indonesia
Class E 65–70 kg	Lê Thị Hồng Ngoan; Vietnam	Monruthai Bangsalad; Thailand	Siti Rahmah Nasir; Malaysia
