= Wrestling at the 2009 SEA Games =

Wrestling was contested at the 2009 SEA Games in Vientiane, Laos from December 15 to December 17 at the Booyong Gymnasium.

== Medal summary ==
* Host nation (Laos)

Rank	Nation	Gold	Silver	Bronze	Total
1	Vietnam (VIE)	7	6	0	13
2	Philippines (PHI)	3	2	4	9
2	Thailand (THA)	3	2	4	9
4	Indonesia (INA)	2	4	6	12
5	Laos (LAO)*	2	0	5	7
6	Cambodia (CAM)	1	3	3	7
7	Singapore (SIN)	0	1	0	1
Totals (7 entries)		18	18	22	58

== Medalists ==
=== Men ===
==== Freestyle ====
Event	Gold	Silver	Bronze
<50 kg	Pham Duc Khang; Vietnam	Paulodelos Santos; Philippines	Vansalong; Laos
<50 kg	Pham Duc Khang; Vietnam	Paulodelos Santos; Philippines	Eko Roni Saputra; Indonesia
50–55 kg	Nguyen Huy Ha; Vietnam	M Ricky Fajar; Indonesia	Jerry Angana; Philippines
50–55 kg	Nguyen Huy Ha; Vietnam	M Ricky Fajar; Indonesia	Chatchai Saensung; Thailand
55–60 kg	Nguyen The Anh; Vietnam	Muh Badrriansyah; Indonesia	Roque Mana-ay; Philippines
60–66 kg	Jimmy Angana; Philippines	Bui Tuan Anh; Vietnam	Ardiansyah Darmawa; Indonesia
66–74 kg	Fahriansyah; Indonesia	Sulaiman Yusoff; Singapore	Phonexay; Laos
74–84 kg	Jason Balabal; Philippines	Surachet Kwannai; Thailand	Dorn Saov; Cambodia
96–120 kg	Ha Van Hieu; Vietnam	Chum Chivinn; Cambodia	Sengtavanh; Laos

==== Greco-Roman ====
Event	Gold	Silver	Bronze
50 kg	Ardiansyah; Indonesia	Kritsada Kongsrichai; Thailand	Thammavongsa; Laos
55 kg	Margarito Angana; Philippines	Ho Quang Hai; Vietnam	Arbainsyah; Indonesia
55 kg	Margarito Angana; Philippines	Ho Quang Hai; Vietnam	Jeerawat Wichain; Thailand
60 kg	Ta Ngoc Tan; Vietnam	Muhamad Aliansyah; Indonesia	Melchor Tumasis; Philippines
66 kg	Sutep Oomchompoo; Thailand	Khong Vam Khoa; Vietnam	Ngabdi; Indonesia
74 kg	Man Ba Xuan; Vietnam	Michael Baletin; Philippines	Dorn Saov; Cambodia
84 kg	Inthanousone; Laos	Duong Van Tung; Vietnam	Suandiwiraala; Indonesia
120 kg	Khonekeo; Laos	Chum Chivinn; Cambodia	Puris Kaewkoed; Thailand

=== Women ===
Event	Gold	Silver	Bronze
<45 kg	Chov Sotheara; Cambodia	Vu Thi Mai; Vietnam	Maribel Jambora; Philippines
48–51 kg	Pham Thi Hue; Vietnam	Sulis Yuliani; Indonesia	Chey Channreaksmey; Cambodia
48–51 kg	Pham Thi Hue; Vietnam	Sulis Yuliani; Indonesia	Amornrat Thanuthong; Thailand
51–55 kg	Darunee Ora-in; Thailand	Try Sothavy; Cambodia	Oday; Laos
55–60 kg	Wilaywan Thongkam; Thailand	Luong Thi Quyen; Vietnam	Ridah Wahdaniyati; Indonesia
