= Taekwondo at the 2009 SEA Games =

Taekwondo at the 2009 SEA Games were held in the Booyong Gymnasium National University Center, Vientiane, Laos

== Medal summary ==
* Host nation (Laos)

Rank	Nation	Gold	Silver	Bronze	Total
1	Thailand (THA)	6	3	4	13
2	Vietnam (VIE)	5	4	2	11
3	Philippines (PHI)	4	4	4	12
4	Laos (LAO)*	3	3	4	10
5	Indonesia (INA)	1	3	6	10
6	Myanmar (MYA)	1	1	5	7
7	Malaysia (MAS)	1	0	6	7
8	Cambodia (CAM)	0	3	4	7
9	Singapore (SIN)	0	0	2	2
10	Timor-Leste (TLS)	0	0	1	1
Totals (10 entries)		21	21	38	80

== Men ==
Event	Gold	Silver	Bronze
54 kg.	Jerranat Nakaviroj; Thailand	Lizardo John Paul; Philippines	Harith Feizal; Malaysia
54 kg.	Jerranat Nakaviroj; Thailand	Lizardo John Paul; Philippines	Tan Junwei Jason; Singapore
58 kg.	Phouthavong Outhasak; Laos	Chhoy Bouthorn; Cambodia	Pen Ek Karaket; Thailand
58 kg.	Phouthavong Outhasak; Laos	Chhoy Bouthorn; Cambodia	Leonel Alves Almelda; Timor-Leste
60 kg.	Mery Wanda; Indonesia	Nacha Phunthong; Thailand	Figueroa Jeffrey; Singapore
60 kg.	Mery Wanda; Indonesia	Nacha Phunthong; Thailand	Kaung Zaw Tun; Myanmar
68 kg.	Go Tshomlee; Philippines	Le Huynh Chau; Vietnam	Mohd Afifuddin Bin Omar; Malaysia
68 kg.	Go Tshomlee; Philippines	Le Huynh Chau; Vietnam	Xaysana Vanhnavong; Laos
74 kg.	Patiwat Thongsalap; Thailand	Sawatvilay Phimmasone; Laos	Yulius Fernando; Indonesia
74 kg.	Patiwat Thongsalap; Thailand	Sawatvilay Phimmasone; Laos	Wanna Ko Ko; Myanmar
Men's 80 kg.	(Vietnam) Luong Minh Dat	(Philippines) Avenido Marlon	(Thailand) Dam Srichan (Myanmar) Zar Ni Htun
Men's 87 kg.	(Vietnam) Nguyen Trong Cuong	(Cambodia) So Naro	(Indonesia) Rizal Samsir
Men's Over 87 kg.	(Philippines) Alexander Briones	(Cambodia) Seon Elit	(Vietnam) Dinh Quang Toan

== Women ==
Category	Gold	Silver	Bronze
Women's 46 kg.	(Thailand) Buttree Puedpong	(Indonesia) Fransisca Valentina	(Laos) Phouthasone Kanthonglat (Myanmar) Thiri Tint Lwin
Women's 49 kg.	(Thailand) Worawong Pongpanit	(Vietnam) Van Thi Kim Thu	(Philippines) Lizardo Jyra (Malaysia) Elaine Toe Shuen Fhern
Women's 53 kg.	(Thailand) Sarita Phongsri	(Philippines) Alora Kathleen Eunice	(Malaysia) Nurul Nadia Mahamat
Women's 57 kg.	(Vietnam) Nguyen Thi Hoai Thu	(Indonesia) Nurul Fadlilah	(Laos) Phonevilay Xaykaexeng (Cambodia) Chieung Puthearim
Women's 62 kg.	(Laos) Tikdaphone Chamnyard	(Indonesia) Rahadewineta	(Cambodia) Cheang Bunna (Thailand) Chonnapas Premwaew
Women's 67 kg.	(Philippines) Rivero Mary Antoinette	(Vietnam) Nguyen Thi Duong	(Laos) Valy Mathmanisone
Women's 73 kg.	(Malaysia) Che Chew Chan	(Vietnam) Ha Thi Nguyen	(Singapore) Quek Jie Lin Jaqueline (Cambodia) Sorn Davin
Women's Over 73 kg.	(Thailand) Rapatkorn Prasopsuk	(Philippines) Alora Kirstie Elaine	(Indonesia) Catur Yuni Riyaningsihi (Malaysia) Lee Wan Yuen

== Poomsae ==
Event	Gold	Silver	Bronze
Individual Men	Soukthavy Panyasith; Laos	(Myanmar) San Shein Thet	(Indonesia) Daniel Danny (Cambodia) Cheat Khemara
Individual Women	Ya Min KKhine; Myanmar	Kidavone; Laos	Lee Jeng Yen; Malaysia
Individual Women	Ya Min KKhine; Myanmar	Kidavone; Laos	Lessitra; Indonesia
Mixed Pair	(Vietnam) Nguyen Dunh Toan; Nguyen Minh Tu	(Thailand) Hassamard Rujirarotchanakorn; Naravich Rujirarotchanakorn	(Philippines) Jean Sabido; Rani Ann Ortega (Myanmar) Chaw Kalayar Win; Thaw Zin Han
Team Men	(Vietnam) Le Trung Anh; Nguyen Dinh Toan; Vu Thanh Duong	(Laos) Soukthavy Panyasith; Bounheng Panyasit; Soukthavone Manirard	(Philippines) Anthony Ray Castillo Matias; Brian Alan Lozano Sabido; Jean Pierre Lozano Sabido (Thailand) Attarnont Wongkittimapron; Noppol Pitukwongdeengam; Suttisri Maneerattanasopit
Team Women	Philippines (PHI); Janice Lagman; Camille Alarilla; Rani Ann Ortega	Thailand (THA); Panida; Pichchapha; Salisa Amnuaychai	Vietnam (VIE); Chau Tuyet Van; Duong Huynh Mai; Nguyen Thi Thu Ngan
Team Women	Philippines (PHI); Janice Lagman; Camille Alarilla; Rani Ann Ortega	Thailand (THA); Panida; Pichchapha; Salisa Amnuaychai	Indonesia (INA); Domas Ayu Kirana; Laras Fitriana; Lessitra

=== Individual Men ===
Rank	Name	NOC	Point Poomsae 1	Point Poomsae 2	Total Points
1st place, gold medalist(s)	Soukthavy Panyasith	(Laos)	8.30	8.33	16.63
2nd place, silver medalist(s)	San Shein Thet	(Myanmar)	8.04	8.06	16.10
3rd place, bronze medalist(s)	Daniel Danny	(Indonesia)	8.00	8.07	16.07
3rd place, bronze medalist(s)	Cheat Khemara	(Cambodia)	7.80	8.07	15.87
5	Anantha Rajan	(Malaysia)	7.37	8.10	15.47

=== Mixed Pair ===
Rank	Name	NOC	Point Poomsae 1	Point Poomsae 2	Total Points
1st place, gold medalist(s)	Nguyen Dunh Toan; Nguyen Minh Tu	(Vietnam)	8.60	8.80	17.40
2nd place, silver medalist(s)	Hassamard Rujirarotchanakorn; Naravich Rujirarotchanakorn	(Thailand)	8.60	8.56	17.16
3rd place, bronze medalist(s)	Jean Sabido; Rani Ann Ortega	(Philippines)	8.36	8.40	16.76
3rd place, bronze medalist(s)	Chaw Kalayar Win; Thaw Zin Han	(Myanmar)	8.40	8.23	16.63
5	Ban Khemara; Ngy Sreyvin	(Cambodia)	8.16	8.10	16.26
6	Lee Pay En; Raffique Hashimi	(Malaysia)	8.17	8.03	16.20

=== Team Men ===
Rank	Name	NOC	Point Poomsae 1	Point Poomsae 2	Total Points
1st place, gold medalist(s)	Le Trung Anh; Nguyen Dinh Toan; Vu Thanh Duong	(Vietnam)	8.73	8.20	16.93
2nd place, silver medalist(s)	Soukthavy Panyasith; Bounheng Panyasit; Soukthavone Manirard	(Laos)	8.50	8.30	16.80
3rd place, bronze medalist(s)	Anthony Ray Castillo Matias; Brian Alan Lozano Sabido; Jean Pierre Lozano Sabido	(Philippines)	8.44	8.30	16.74
3rd place, bronze medalist(s)	Attarnont Wongkittimapron; Noppol Pitukwongdeengam; Suttisri Maneerattanasopit	(Thailand)	8.34	8.36	16.70
