= Kritsada Kongsrichai =

Thai mixed martial arts fighter

- Born: Kritsada Kongsrichai; 8 August 1991 (age 35); Sichon district, Nakhon Si Thammarat, Thailand
- Other names: Dream Man
- Nationality: Thai
- Height: 161 cm (5 ft 3 1/2 in)
- Weight: 57 kg (126 lb; 9.0 st)
- Division: Strawweight; Flyweight; Bantamweight
- Style: Wrestling
- Fighting out of: Thailand
- Team: WildCard MMA; DNA Thailand; Team Hunter
- Trainer: Tommy Hayden
- Wrestling: Greco-Roman wrestling
- Years active: 2014–Present

Mixed martial arts record
- Total: 15
- Wins: 7
- By knockout: 4
- By submission: 2
- By decision: 1
- Losses: 8
- By knockout: 5
- By submission: 2
- By disqualification: 1

Other information
- Mixed martial arts record from Sherdog

Medal record

Men's Greco-Roman wrestling

Representing Thailand

Southeast Asian Games
Silver medal – second place	2009 Vientiane	50 kg
Bronze medal – third place	2013 Naypyidaw	55 kg
Silver medal – second place	2021 Hanoi	60 kg

Kritsada Kongsrichai (Thai: กฤษดา คงศรีชาย; born 8 August 1991) is a Thai mixed martial artist who most recently fought for ONE Championship, competing in their Strawweight division. He made his ONE debut in 2016. He has also competed for DEEP, making his debut in 2020. Kongsrichai is also a Greco-Roman wrestler who has won a silver medal and a bronze medal at the 2009 Southeast Asian Games and 2013 Southeast Asian Games respectively, in addition to multiple national championships.

As a mixed martial artist from Thailand, Kongsrichai has distinguished himself from other Thai fighters with his extensive wrestling background that makes up most of his fighting style. Prior to turning to MMA, he was trained in both freestyle wrestling and Greco-Roman wrestling, competing in over 200 combined matches, in addition to participating in the Southeast Asian Games and Asian Games as a Greco-Roman wrestler.

== Early life and background ==
Kritsada Kongsrichai was born in Nakhon Si Thammarat in the South of Thailand on 1991.

At an early age he was eager to learn Muay Thai, as many of his neighbors were practicing the sport. However, his mother was hesitant in letting him get involved. In the beginning, he would train and fight in secret. Eventually, he'd amassed 200 Muay Thai fights and was later crowned Southern Thailand Muay Thai Champion.

== Wrestling career ==
Kongsrichai's interest in Muay Thai was short-lived, however, and he began to seek out other sporting endeavors. With the help of his cousin, who was a wrestler, he went to the Srisaket Sports School to learn wrestling.

At the age of 15, he was selected to the Thailand national wrestling team. He started out with only freestyle wrestling but later picked up Greco-Roman wrestling, where he would channel his focus on training and competing in the latter style.

Kritsada Kongsrichai would go on to represent Thailand in Greco-Roman wrestling at the 2009 SEA Games, competing in the 50 kg event. He would finish second and won the silver medal in the men's 50 kg Greco-Roman wrestling event.

Kongsrichai was one of 5 Thai wrestlers selected to participate in the 2010 Asian Games in Guangzhou, China. However, he would only make it to the tournament quarterfinals, losing to Japan's Kohei Hasegawa, and did not win any medals.

Kritsada Kongsrichai returned at the 2013 SEA Games to compete in Greco-Roman wrestling, where he finished in third place to win the bronze medal.

Kongsrichai resumed competing at the SEA Games when he appeared at the 2021 Southeast Asian Games in Hanoi, Vietnam. He made it to the finals of the men's 60 kg Greco-Roman tournament, losing to Angana Jandog Margarito Jr. of the Philippines to win the silver medal.

In total, Kongsrichai has been the Thailand national wrestling champion for 13 times and has a combined wrestling record of 180–20.

== Mixed martial arts career ==
=== Full Metal Dojo ===
Kongsrichai made his mixed martial arts debut for the Thai promotion Full Metal Dojo.

On 23 August 2014, Kritsada Kongsrichai made his debut at Full Metal Dojo 2: Protect Your Neck, where he lost to Kichong Tran by second-round submission via rear-naked choke.

He would pick up his first professional victory on 22 November 2014 at Full Metal Dojo 3: No Sleep 'Til Bangkok with a first-round submission of Manachai Promsawad via rear-naked choke.

On 6 March 2015, he lost to Caleb Lally by TKO at Sena Combat: Pattaya Fight Night.

On 22 August 2015, he defeated Detchadin Sorsirisuphathin by TKO at Full Metal Dojo 6: For Those About to Rock... to capture the vacant FMD Bantamweight Championship.

Kongsrichai would then defeat Pakorn Isarat by submission via rear-naked choke in the first round at Full Metal Dojo 10: To Live and Die in Bangkok on 19 March 2016.

=== ONE Championship ===
With his success and title win on Full Metal Dojo, Kongsrichai was eventually contacted and signed by ONE Championship.

Kritsada Kongsrichai made his ONE Championship debut on 27 May 2016 at ONE Championship: Kingdom of Champions, where he defeated Kev Hemmorlor by first-round TKO.

His next fight saw him facing future ONE Strawweight World Champion Joshua Pacio at ONE Championship: Heroes of the World on 13 August 2016. Kongsrichai lost the fight by submission via rear-naked choke.

On 11 March 2017, Kongsrichai faced Adrian Mattheis at ONE Championship: Warrior Kingdom, where he won via first-round TKO after dominating with his wrestling-based grappling.

On 9 December 2017, Kongsrichai defeated Rabin Catalan by first-round TKO at ONE Championship: Warriors of the World.

Next, Kongsrichai was matched up with Robin Catalan, Rabin Catalan's brother. On 24 March 2018, the two faced off at ONE Championship: Iron Will. Kritsada Kongsrichai appeared to win the fight by TKO after executing a suplex on Catalan. However, after the fight, reviews determined that the suplex was illegal and the result was reversed to a disqualification loss for Kongsrichai.

On 29 June 2018, Kritsada Kongsrichai faced Jeremy Miado at ONE Championship: Spirit of a Warrior. After the fight went the distance for three rounds, Kongsrichai was awarded the unanimous decision victory.

=== Post-ONE ===
After over a year away from mixed martial arts action, Kongsrichai was scheduled to return to face Kosuke Terashima at DEEP 94 Impact on 1 March 2020. He lost by second-round TKO via submission to strikes.

Kongsrichai was scheduled to return to mixed martial arts against John Shink at Fairtex Fight: Descendants of the Empire II, to be held in Lumpinee Stadium, on 12 March 2022. He lost by first-round knockout.

He faced Kim Kyu Sung at Fairtex Fight: Domination on 11 June 2022. Kongsrichai lost by second-round technical knockout.

== Fighting style ==
Like most Thais trying their hand in mixed martial arts, Kritsada Kongsrichai has some experience in Muay Thai, which is considered to be the foundational martial art for many Thai MMA fighters.

However, Kongsrichai's style is primarily rooted in wrestling. Kongsrichai has a Greco-Roman wrestling pedigree, having competed in the Asian Games and Southeast Asian Games. He often uses his high-class wrestling to dominate his opponents before implementing strikes in order to go for a finish. He oftentimes combines his Muay Thai and wrestling styles in his fights with great effectiveness, taking his opponents down with his wrestling before attempting to finish them off with ground-and-pound. While competing in Full Metal Dojo, Kongsrichai also proved capable of using submissions on the ground, particularly the rear naked choke.

== Titles and accomplishments ==
=== Greco-Roman wrestling ===
- Southeast Asian Games
  - (silver) 2009 Southeast Asian Games Men's Greco-Roman 50 kg – second place
  - (bronze) 2013 Southeast Asian Games Men's Greco-Roman 55 kg – third place
  - (silver) 2021 Southeast Asian Games Men's Greco-Roman 60 kg – second place
- Thailand National Games
  - (gold) 41st Thailand National Games in Chiang Mai (2012) – Men's Greco-Roman 55 kg – first place
  - (gold) 42nd Thailand National Games in Suphan Buri (2013) – Men's Greco-Roman 55 kg – first place
  - (gold) 43rd Thailand National Games in Nakhon Ratchasima (2014) – Men's Greco-Roman 59 kg – first place
  - (gold) 44th Thailand National Games in Nakhon Sawan (2015) – Men's Greco-Roman 59 kg – first place
  - (gold) 45th Thailand National Games in Songkhla (2017) – Men's Greco-Roman 59 kg – first place
  - (gold) 46th Thailand National Games in Chiang Rai (2018) – Men's Greco-Roman 60 kg – first place
  - (gold) 47th Thailand National Games in Sisaket (2022) – Men's Greco-Roman 60 kg – first place

=== Mixed martial arts ===
- Full Metal Dojo
  - FMD Bantamweight Championship

== Mixed martial arts record ==
Professional record breakdown
15 matches	7 wins	8 losses
By knockout	4	5
By submission	2	2
By decision	1	0
By disqualification	0	1

Res.	Record	Opponent	Method	Event	Date	Round	Time	Location	Notes
Loss	7–8	Andrei Chelbaev	TKO (punch to the body)	Fairtex Fight: The Origin	21 January 2023	1	N/A	Bangkok, Thailand	
Loss	7–7	Kim Kyu-sung	TKO (punches)	Fairtex Fight: Domination	11 June 2022	2	2:28	Bangkok, Thailand	
Loss	7–6	John Shink	KO (punch)	Fairtex Fight: Descendants of the Empire 2	12 March 2022	1	N/A	Bangkok, Thailand	
Loss	7–5	Kosuke Terashima	TKO (submission to punches)	Deep 94: Impact	1 March 2020	2	4:11	Tokyo, Japan	
Win	7–4	Jeremy Miado	Decision (unanimous)	ONE: Spirit of a Warrior	29 June 2018	3	5:00	Yangon, Myanmar	
Loss	6–4	Robin Catalan	DQ (illegal slam)	ONE: Iron Will	24 March 2018	1	1:40	Bangkok, Thailand	Originally a TKO (slam) win for Kongsrichai; the result was reversed to a disqualification loss.
Win	6–3	Rabin Catalan	TKO (submission to punches)	ONE: Warriors of the World	9 December 2017	1	3:01	Bangkok, Thailand	
Win	5–3	Adrian Mattheis	TKO (elbows)	ONE: Warrior Kingdom	11 March 2017	1	2:51	Bangkok, Thailand	
Loss	4–3	Joshua Pacio	Submission (rear-naked choke)	ONE: Heroes of the World	13 August 2016	1	4:27	Macau, SAR, China	
Win	4–2	Kev Hemmorlor	TKO (punches and elbows)	ONE: Kingdom of Champions	22 May 2016	3	5:00	Bangkok, Thailand	
Win	3–2	Pakorn Isarat	Submission (rear-naked choke)	Full Metal Dojo 10: To Live and Die in Bangkok	19 March 2016	1	4:18	Bangkok, Thailand	
Win	2–2	Dechadin Srosirisuphathin	TKO (cut)	Full Metal Dojo 6: For Those About To Rock...	22 August 2015	1	3:31	Bangkok, Thailand	Won the vacant Full Metal Dojo Bantamweight Championship
Loss	1–2	Caleb Lally	TKO (punches)	Sena Combat: Pattaya Fight Night	6 March 2015	1	3:10	Pattaya, Thailand	
Win	1–1	Manachai Promsawad	Submission (rear-naked choke)	Full Metal Dojo 3: No Sleep 'Til Bangkok	22 November 2014	1	0:00	Bangkok, Thailand	
Loss	0–1	Kichong Tran	Submission (rear-naked choke)	Full Metal Dojo 2: Protect Your Neck	23 August 2014	2	0:00	Bangkok, Thailand	

== See also ==
- List of male mixed martial artists
