= Golf at the 2009 SEA Games =

Golf at the SEA Games

Golf in the 25th SEA Games was held at SEA Games Golf Course in Vientiane, Laos from 11–14 December.

== Medal summary ==
=== Men ===
Event	Gold	Silver	Bronze
Individual	Wasin Sripattranusorn; Thailand	Johnson Poh Swee Kiat; Singapore	Benita Yuniarto Kasiadi; Indonesia
Team	Thailand (THA); Wasin Sripattranusorn; Thanyakon Khrongpha; Wongsakorn Choowong; Pawin Ingkhapradit	Singapore (SIN); Johnson Poh Swee Kiat; Jonathan Leong; Jonathan Ke-Jun Woo; Lam Zhiqun	Philippines (PHI); Mhark Fernando; Antonio Asistio II; Jhonnel Ababa; Jude Estaquio

=== Women ===
Event	Gold	Silver	Bronze
Individual	Chihiro Ikeda; Philippines	Yupaporn Kawinpakorn; Thailand	Kelly Tan; Malaysia
Team	Philippines (PHI); Chihiro Ikeda; Mia Piccio; Dottie Ardina	Thailand (THA); Yupaporn Kawinpakorn; Thidapa Suwannapura; Pinrath Loomboonruang	Malaysia (MAS); Kelly Tan; Ainil Johani Abu Bakar; Michelle Koh

== Medal table ==
Legend

Rank	Nation	Gold	Silver	Bronze	Total
1	Thailand (THA)	2	2	0	4
2	Philippines (PHI)	2	0	1	3
3	Singapore (SIN)	0	2	0	2
4	Malaysia (MAS)	0	0	2	2
5	Indonesia (INA)	0	0	1	1
Totals (5 entries)		4	4	4	12
