= Judo at the 2009 SEA Games =

Judo at the 2009 SEA Games was held at the Chao Anouvong Gymnasium in Vientiane, Laos from 15 to 17 December 2009.

== Medal summary ==
* Host nation (Laos)

Rank	Nation	Gold	Silver	Bronze	Total
1	Vietnam	7	1	5	13
2	Thailand	4	6	4	14
3	Laos*	2	5	4	11
4	Myanmar	2	2	5	9
5	Philippines	2	1	4	7
6	Indonesia	1	1	6	8
7	Malaysia	0	1	3	4
8	Singapore	0	1	2	3
Totals (8 entries)		18	18	33	69

== Medalists ==
=== Men ===
Event	Gold	Silver	Bronze
Nage no kata	Vietnam (VIE); Nguyen Thanh Tai; Nguyen Ngoc Son	Thailand (THA); Pongthep Tumrongluk; Sangob Sasipongpan	Laos (LAO); Chansy Viengvilay; Syvanevilay Chindavon
50–55kg	Huynh Nhat Thong; Vietnam	Chittakone Sivanvilay; Laos	Toni Irawan; Indonesia
50–55kg	Huynh Nhat Thong; Vietnam	Chittakone Sivanvilay; Laos	Kap Cin Pau; Myanmar
55–60kg	Hein Lat Zaw; Myanmar	Supapon Patomkulniti; Thailand	Chindavone; Laos
55–60kg	Hein Lat Zaw; Myanmar	Supapon Patomkulniti; Thailand	Ho Ngan Giang; Vietnam
60–66kg	Nguyen Quoc Hung; Vietnam	Saw Maing San; Myanmar	Peter Taslim; Indonesia
60–66kg	Nguyen Quoc Hung; Vietnam	Saw Maing San; Myanmar	Amornthep Namwiset; Thailand
66–73kg	Archilleus Ralli; Thailand	Abdullah Marjan; Malaysia	Jimmy Anggoro; Indonesia
66–73kg	Archilleus Ralli; Thailand	Abdullah Marjan; Malaysia	Gilbert Ramirez; Philippines
73–81kg	John Baylon; Philippines	Watcharin Jampawong; Thailand	Aung Moe; Myanmar
73–81kg	John Baylon; Philippines	Watcharin Jampawong; Thailand	Chong Wai Keat; Malaysia
81–90kg	Zin Linn Aung; Myanmar	Phensy Phonepaseud; Laos	Rick Senales; Philippines
81–90kg	Zin Linn Aung; Myanmar	Phensy Phonepaseud; Laos	Wuttikrai Srisoprap; Thailand
90–100kg	Krisna Bayu; Indonesia	Wee Pui Seng; Singapore	Dang Hao; Vietnam
90–100kg	Krisna Bayu; Indonesia	Wee Pui Seng; Singapore	Manivong Sengsouly; Laos
100–120kg	Khemkham Kommanivong; Laos	Tharalat Sutthiphun; Thailand	Ly Huynh Long; Vietnam

=== Women ===
Event	Gold	Silver	Bronze
Jyu no kata	Thailand (THA); Chuthathip Bampenboon; Pitima Thaweerattanasinp	Vietnam (VIE); Nguyen Lan Linh; Le Ngoc Van Anh	Singapore (SIN); Cai Ren Jun; Ngo Yee Ling
40–45kg	Nancy Quillotes; Philippines	Wanwisa Muenjit; Thailand	Mayouly Phanouvong; Laos
40–45kg	Nancy Quillotes; Philippines	Wanwisa Muenjit; Thailand	Selwee; Myanmar
45–48kg	Van Ngoc Tu; Vietnam	Phetnida Syamphoen; Laos	Noor Maizura Zainon; Malaysia
45–48kg	Van Ngoc Tu; Vietnam	Phetnida Syamphoen; Laos	Helen Dawa; Philippines
48–52kg	Sayarath Phonenaly; Laos	Sureerat Sadmaroeng; Thailand	Yuliati; Indonesia
48–52kg	Sayarath Phonenaly; Laos	Sureerat Sadmaroeng; Thailand	Dang Le Bich Van; Vietnam
52–57kg	Nguyen Thi Kieu; Vietnam	Chipchinda Bonhphaaksone; Laos	Om Pongchaliew; Thailand
52–57kg	Nguyen Thi Kieu; Vietnam	Chipchinda Bonhphaaksone; Laos	Ang Xuan Yi; Singapore
57–63kg	Bui Thi Hoa; Vietnam	Anggraeni Teni; Indonesia	Aye Aye Aung; Myanmar
57–63kg	Bui Thi Hoa; Vietnam	Anggraeni Teni; Indonesia	Nik Norbaizura; Malaysia
63–70kg	Surattana Thongsri; Thailand	Thandar Win; Myanmar	Indah Setiawati; Indonesia
63–70kg	Surattana Thongsri; Thailand	Thandar Win; Myanmar	Karen Ann Solomon; Philippines
70–78kg	Nguyen Thi Nhu; Vietnam	Ruth Dugaduga; Philippines	Patcharee Pichaipat; Thailand
70–78kg	Nguyen Thi Nhu; Vietnam	Ruth Dugaduga; Philippines	Disiyana; Indonesia
>78kg	Thonthan Bunduang; Thailand	Phommavihane Sipaphay; Laos	Nguyen Thi Thu Loan; Vietnam
>78kg	Thonthan Bunduang; Thailand	Phommavihane Sipaphay; Laos	Khin Myo Thu; Myanmar
