= Eko Roni Saputra =

Indonesian amateur wrestler

- Born: 2 May 1991 (age 35); Samarinda, East Kalimantan, Indonesia
- Nationality: Indonesian
- Height: 163 cm (5 ft 4 in)
- Weight: 61.2 kg (135 lb; 10 st)
- Division: Flyweight
- Reach: 67.5 in (171 cm)
- Style: Wrestling
- Fighting out of: Singapore
- Team: Evolve MMA; Team Showstopper
- Wrestling: Freestyle wrestling
- Years active: 2019–present

Mixed martial arts record
- Total: 13
- Wins: 7
- By knockout: 2
- By submission: 5
- Losses: 6
- By knockout: 5
- By decision: 1

Other information
- Mixed martial arts record from Sherdog

Eko Roni Saputra (born 2 May 1991) is an Indonesian mixed martial artist competing in the Flyweight division. He has previously competed for ONE Championship. He trains out of Evolve MMA in Singapore.

Saputra is also a former freestyle wrestler who has won bronze and silver medals at the Southeast Asian Games in 2009 and 2013. He has also competed in the 2018 Asian Games in Jakarta in the 57 kg division.

== Background ==
Saputra grew up in poverty in Samarinda on the island of Borneo. His parents sold fish in the market and his father became a boxing coach after his fish-trading business went bankrupt. Hence he started training boxing when he was just 5 years old and at the age of 13 years old, he switched to wrestling because my father said there was a greater opportunity to become a national champion.

Saptura would win at the Southeast Asian Games, getting bronze at the 2009 Southeast Asian Games at 50 kg and silver at the 2013 Yangon at 55 kg. In 2018, he decided to transition to MMA and relocated to Singapore to pursue his new career, joining the Evolve MMA.

== Mixed martial arts career ==
=== ONE Championship ===
Saputra made his MMA debut against Niko Soe on 12 April 2019 at ONE Championship: Roots of Honor. He lost the bout via doctor stoppage in the first round.

In his sophomore performance, Saputra faced Kaji Ebin on 25 October 2019 at ONE Championship: Dawn Of Valor. He won the bout in the first round due stoppage by the way of shoulder injury.

Saputra faced Khon Sichan at ONE Championship: Warrior's Code on 7 February 2020. He won the bout via rear-naked choke in the first round.

Saputra faced Murugan Silvarajoo at ONE Championship: Reign of Dynasties on 9 October 2020. He won the bout via keylock submission in the first round.

In a quick turnaround, Saputra faced Ramon Gonzalez at ONE Championship: Inside the Matrix 2 on 6 November 2020. He won the bout via rear-naked choke in the first round.

In his lone performance of 2021, Saputra faced Liu Peng Shuai at ONE Championship: Battleground 2 on 13 August 2021. He won the bout in ten seconds, knocking out Shuai in ten seconds.

Saputra was booked to face Chan Rothana at ONE: Lights Out on 11 March 2022. He won the fight by rear-naked choke in the first round.

Saputra faced Yodkaikaew Fairtex on 21 October 2022 at ONE 162. He won the fight by a heel hook in the first round. This win earned him the Performance of the Night award.

Saputra faced Danny Kingad on 25 February 2023, at ONE Fight Night 7. He lost the fight via unanimous decision.

Stepping in as a short notice replacement for an injured Danny Kingad, Saputra faced Hu Yong on 7 October 2023, at ONE Fight Night 15. He lost the fight via technical knockout in the first round.

After re-signed with contact, Saputra faced Sanzhar Zakirov on 8 March 2025, at ONE Fight Night 29. He lost the fight via knockout in round two.

On 9 June 2026, it was reported that Saputra was released by ONE Championship.

== Championships and accomplishments ==
=== Mixed martial arts ===
- ONE Championship
  - Performance of the Night (One time) vs. Yodkaikaew Fairtex

=== Freestyle wrestling ===
- Southeast Asian Games
  - 2009 Southeast Asian Games Men's Freestyle 50 kg – (bronze) 3rd place
  - 2013 Southeast Asian Games Men's Freestyle 55 kg – (silver) 2nd place

== Mixed martial arts record ==
Professional record breakdown
| 13 matches | 7 wins | 6 losses |
| By knockout | 2 | 5 |
| By submission | 5 | 0 |
| By decision | 0 | 1 |

| Res. | Record | Opponent | Method | Event | Date | Round | Time | Location | Notes |
|---|---|---|---|---|---|---|---|---|---|
| Loss | 7–6 | Lito Adiwang | TKO (punches) | ONE Fight Night 43 | 16 May 2026 | 1 | 0:34 | Bangkok, Thailand | Featherweight debut. |
| Loss | 7–5 | Gilbert Nakatani | TKO (punches) | ONE Fight Night 37 | 8 November 2025 | 1 | 2:01 | Bangkok, Thailand | |
| Loss | 7–4 | Sanzhar Zakirov | KO (punches) | ONE Fight Night 29 | 8 March 2025 | 2 | 1:46 | Bangkok, Thailand | Catchweight (140 lb) bout. |
| Loss | 7–3 | Hu Yong | TKO (punches) | ONE Fight Night 15 | 7 October 2023 | 1 | 1:03 | Bangkok, Thailand | |
| Loss | 7–2 | Danny Kingad | Decision (unanimous) | ONE Fight Night 7 | 25 February 2023 | 3 | 5:00 | Bangkok, Thailand | |
| Win | 7–1 | Yodkaikaew Fairtex | Submission (heel hook) | ONE 162 | 21 October 2022 | 1 | 2:16 | Kuala Lumpur, Malaysia | Performance of the Night. |
| Win | 6–1 | Chan Rothana | Submission (rear-naked choke) | ONE: Lights Out | 11 March 2022 | 1 | 1:34 | Kallang, Singapore | |
| Win | 5–1 | Liu Pengshuai | KO (punch) | ONE: Battleground 2 | 13 August 2021 | 1 | 0:10 | Kallang, Singapore | |
| Win | 4–1 | Ramon Gonzalez | Submission (rear-naked choke) | ONE: Inside the Matrix 2 | 6 November 2020 | 1 | 4:07 | Kallang, Singapore | |
| Win | 3–1 | Murugan Silvarajoo | Submission (keylock) | ONE: Reign of Dynasties | 9 October 2020 | 1 | 2:29 | Kallang, Singapore | Catchweight (140 lb) bout. |
| Win | 2–1 | Khon Sichan | Submission (rear-naked choke) | ONE: Warrior's Code | 7 February 2020 | 1 | 3:45 | Jakarta, Indonesia | |
| Win | 1–1 | Kaji Ebin | TKO (shoulder injury) | ONE: Dawn of Valor | 25 October 2019 | 1 | 0:19 | Jakarta, Indonesia | |
| Loss | 0–1 | Niko Soe | TKO (doctor stoppage) | ONE: Roots of Honor | 12 April 2019 | 1 | 3:03 | Pasay, Philippines | Bantamweight debut. |
