= Shuttlecock at the 2009 SEA Games =

The Shuttlecock at the 2009 Southeast Asian Games was held from December 12 to December 16 at the Beung Kha Nong Sports Centre Gymnasium 1 in Vientiane, Laos.

== Medal summary ==
* Host nation (Laos)

Rank	Nation	Gold	Silver	Bronze	Total
1	Vietnam (VIE)	4	0	0	4
2	Laos (LAO)*	3	3	1	7
3	Thailand (THA)	0	4	1	5
4	Cambodia (CAM)	0	0	7	7
Totals (4 entries)		7	7	9	23

== Medalists ==
Event	Gold	Silver	Bronze
Men's Singles	Southisone Thonm; Laos	Aphisak Saracho; Thailand	Heng Rawut; Cambodia
Men's Doubles	Laos (LAO); Southisone Thonm; Khamphong phouth	Thailand (THA); Wannimit Promde; Praphan Mainoi	Cambodia (CAM); Soeur Vanmak; Chhin Vitou
Men's Team	Vietnam (VIE)	Laos (LAO)	Thailand (THA)
Men's Team	Vietnam (VIE)	Laos (LAO)	Cambodia (CAM)
Women's Singles	Trinh Thi Nga; Vietnam	Jindamon; Thailand	Chea Sreymeas; Cambodia
Women's Singles	Trinh Thi Nga; Vietnam	Jindamon; Thailand	Malaythong Daosi; Laos
Women's Doubles	Vietnam (VIE); Le Thi Be Sau; Cao Hai Yen	Laos (LAO); Malaythong Daosi; Khamkhun Louangl	Cambodia (CAM); Chea Sreymeas; San Sophorn
Women's Team	Vietnam (VIE)	Laos (LAO)	Cambodia (CAM)
Mixed Doubles	Laos (LAO); Phathoumphone Pha; Prongeun Kongman	Thailand (THA); Sarayut Kamloi; Jindamon	Cambodia (CAM); Chhin Vitou; San Sopheap
