= Sepak takraw at the 2009 SEA Games =

Sepak Takraw at the 2009 SEA Games was held at the LAO International Trade Exhibition and Convention Centre - ITECC Hall 1 in Vientiane, Laos

== Medal summary ==
* Host nation (Laos)

Rank	Nation	Gold	Silver	Bronze	Total
1	Thailand (THA)	5	1	0	6
2	Myanmar (MYA)	3	1	1	5
3	Vietnam (VIE)	0	4	0	4
4	Laos (LAO)*	0	1	4	5
5	Malaysia (MAS)	0	1	1	2
6	Indonesia (INA)	0	0	5	5
7	Philippines (PHI)	0	0	4	4
Totals (7 entries)		8	8	15	31

== Medalists ==
=== Men ===
Event	Gold	Silver	Bronze
Regu	Thailand; Kriangkrai Kaewmian; Pattarapong Yupadee; Anuwat Chaichana	Laos; Daovy Savavongsay; Thittavanh Bounpaseuth; Champiane Somamaving	Malaysia; Mohd Syafiq; Noor Azman; Norshahruddin
Regu	Thailand; Kriangkrai Kaewmian; Pattarapong Yupadee; Anuwat Chaichana	Laos; Daovy Savavongsay; Thittavanh Bounpaseuth; Champiane Somamaving	Philippines; Metodio Suico Jr; Quirante Marbie; Saavedra Gene Mark
Doubles	Myanmar; Si Thu Lin; Zaw Lat; Aung Cho Myint	Vietnam; Trần Quang Khải; Lê Tiến Dũng; Liêu Bá Tùng	Laos; Thittavanh Bounpaseuth; Champiane Somamaving; Vilaysack Nanthavo
Doubles	Myanmar; Si Thu Lin; Zaw Lat; Aung Cho Myint	Vietnam; Trần Quang Khải; Lê Tiến Dũng; Liêu Bá Tùng	Philippines; Metodio Suico Jr; Aleta Junmar; Saavedra Gene Mark
Hoop	Thailand; Chaiya Wattano; Saharat Uonompai; Wattana Jaiyen; Narachai Chumeungkusol; Ekachai Masuk; Thanaiwat Yoosuk	Myanmar; Thein Zaw Min; Than Zaw Oo; Aung Hlaing Moe; Maung Maung Sein; Aung Zaw; Aung Kyaw Moe	Indonesia; Suko Hartono; Wisnu Dwi; Yudi Purnomo; Sugeng Arifin; Miftakhul Arief; Rohman Hidayat
Hoop	Thailand; Chaiya Wattano; Saharat Uonompai; Wattana Jaiyen; Narachai Chumeungkusol; Ekachai Masuk; Thanaiwat Yoosuk	Myanmar; Thein Zaw Min; Than Zaw Oo; Aung Hlaing Moe; Maung Maung Sein; Aung Zaw; Aung Kyaw Moe	Philippines; Danilo Alipan; Joel Carbonilla; Harrison Castanares; Metodio Suico Jr; Jerome Vendiola; Hector Memarion
Team	Thailand; Suriyan Peachan; Suebsak Phunsueb; Pornchai Kaokaew; Pattarapong Yupadee; Anuwat Chaichana; Kriangkrai Kaewmian; Somporn Jaisinghol; Singha Somsakul; Panomporn Aiemsa-ard	Malaysia; Mohd Hamikhairi; Mohd Syafiq; Muhammad Syazwan; Ahmad Sufi; Farhan Adam; Norshahruddin; Mohamad Fazil; Mohd Hafizie; Shahril	Indonesia; Suko Hartono; Wisnu Dwi; Yudi Purnomo; Muhammad Nasrum; Hendra Pago; Sugeng Arifin; Saiful Rijal; Abrian Sihab; Suam Sul Hadi
Team	Thailand; Suriyan Peachan; Suebsak Phunsueb; Pornchai Kaokaew; Pattarapong Yupadee; Anuwat Chaichana; Kriangkrai Kaewmian; Somporn Jaisinghol; Singha Somsakul; Panomporn Aiemsa-ard	Malaysia; Mohd Hamikhairi; Mohd Syafiq; Muhammad Syazwan; Ahmad Sufi; Farhan Adam; Norshahruddin; Mohamad Fazil; Mohd Hafizie; Shahril	Myanmar; Zaw Lat; Zaw Zaw Htet; Thein Zaw Min; Khaw Thi Ha Oo; Yar Zar Htun; Si Thu Lin; Aung Cho Myint; Aung Myo Swe; Khaw Soe Win

=== Women ===
Event	Gold	Silver	Bronze
Regu	Thailand; Nitinadda Kaewkamsai; Areerat Takan; Tidawan Daosakul	Vietnam; Lưu Thị Thanh; Nguyễn Hải Thảo; Nguyễn Thị Bích Thùy	Laos; Malee Matmanivong; Koy Xayavong; Chanlakhone Inthavongsa
Regu	Thailand; Nitinadda Kaewkamsai; Areerat Takan; Tidawan Daosakul	Vietnam; Lưu Thị Thanh; Nguyễn Hải Thảo; Nguyễn Thị Bích Thùy	Indonesia; Hasmawati Umar; Nur Qadri Yanti; Lena
Doubles	Myanmar; Kyu Kyu Thin; May Zin Phyo; Phyu Phyu Than	Thailand; Waree Nantasing; Sasiwimol Janthasit; Tidawan Daosakul	Laos; Malee Matmanivong; Koy Xayavong; Mithananh Bounpaseath
Doubles	Myanmar; Kyu Kyu Thin; May Zin Phyo; Phyu Phyu Than	Thailand; Waree Nantasing; Sasiwimol Janthasit; Tidawan Daosakul	Indonesia; Hasmawati Umar; Jumasiah; Lena
Hoop	Myanmar; Naing Naing Win; Kyu Kyu Thin; Su Tin Zar Naing; Nwe Nwe Htwe; Phyu Phyu Than; May Zin Phyo	Vietnam; Trần Thị Thu Hằng; Nguyễn Thị Hòa; Nguyễn Thị Minh Trang; Nguyễn Thái Linh; Cao Thị Yến; Nguyễn Thị Quyên	Indonesia; Alberthin Suryani; Jumasiah; Nur Qadri Yanti; Dini Mitasari; Hasmawati Umar; Lena
Hoop	Myanmar; Naing Naing Win; Kyu Kyu Thin; Su Tin Zar Naing; Nwe Nwe Htwe; Phyu Phyu Than; May Zin Phyo	Vietnam; Trần Thị Thu Hằng; Nguyễn Thị Hòa; Nguyễn Thị Minh Trang; Nguyễn Thái Linh; Cao Thị Yến; Nguyễn Thị Quyên	Philippines; Deseree Autor; Irene Apdon; Gelyn Evora; Sarah Jean Catain; Rhea Padrigo
Team	Thailand; Sunthari Rupsung; Nisa Thanaattawut; Areerat Takan; Tidawan Daosakul; Chotika Boonthong; Phikun Seedam; Kaewjai Pumsawangkaew; Wanwisa Jankaen; Payom Srihongsa	Vietnam; Thạch Thị Mỹ Linh; Trương Thị Vân; Lại Thị Huyền Trang; Nguyễn Hải Thảo; Nguyễn Thị Bích Thùy; Lưu Thị Thanh; Lê Thị Hạnh; Nguyễn Thị Thúy An; Nguyễn Bạch Vân	Laos; Philavanh Chanthasili; Sonsavanh Keosoulya; Valinna Keomanivong; Mithananh Bounpaseath; Koy Xayavong; Chanlakhone Inthavongsa; Bounlai Silivanh; Damdouane Lattanavongsa; Khampha Chaleunsy
