= Muay Lao at the 2009 SEA Games =

- Venue: Lao-Thai Gymnasium, Beung Kha Ngong Sport Centre
- Location: Vientiane, Laos
- Dates: 10–15 December
- Nations: 5

Muay Lao at the 2009 SEA Games was held at Lao-Thai Gymnasium, Beung Kha Ngong Sport Centre from 10 to 15 December 2009 in Vientiane, Laos.

== Medal summary ==
* Host nation (Laos)

Rank	Nation	Gold	Silver	Bronze	Total
1	Thailand	6	2	1	9
2	Laos*	5	3	1	9
3	Vietnam	1	5	3	9
4	Philippines	1	3	5	9
5	Myanmar	0	0	5	5
Totals (5 entries)		13	13	15	41

== Medalists ==
=== Men ===
Event	Gold	Silver	Bronze
Pinweight; 45 kg	Thongngam Nattakorn; Thailand	Bouavanh Chanthaly; Laos	Lê Đức Cường; Vietnam
Light flyweight 48 kg	Soukan Taipanyavong; Laos	Roland Claro; Philippines	Aye Ko Ko; Myanmar
Flyweight; 51 kg	Thongbang Seuaphom; Laos	Romnick Pabalate; Philippines	Nane Htaw Taw; Myanmar
Bantamweight; 54 kg	Noukhit Ladsaphao; Laos	Anuchit Sathit; Thailand	Soe Maung Muang; Myanmar
Featherweight; 57 kg	Teerawat Wannalee; Thailand	Nguyễn Trần Duy Nhất; Vietnam	Than Oo; Myanmar
Lightweight; 60 kg	Zaidi Laruan; Philippines	Vixay Bounthavy; Laos	Win Tun; Myanmar
Lightweight; 60 kg	Zaidi Laruan; Philippines	Vixay Bounthavy; Laos	Ly Hoang Tan; Vietnam
Light welterweight 63.5 kg	Weerapon Kwangkhwang; Thailand	Jonathan Polosan; Philippines	Võ Văn Đài; Vietnam
Welterweight; 67 kg	Sakdithat Sakdarat; Thailand	Bùi Huỳnh Giang; Vietnam	Harold Gregorio; Philippines

=== Women ===
Event	Gold	Silver	Bronze
Pinweight; 45 kg	Molthira Vatanapackdee; Thailand	Bounchanh Sengpaserth; Laos	May Libao; Philippines
Light flyweight 48 kg	Phouthasone Keosayavong; Laos	Nguyễn Thị Tuyết Dung; Vietnam	Maricel Subang; Philippines
Flyweight; 51 kg	Nguyễn Thị Tuyết Mai; Vietnam	Konnika Nuanboriboon; Thailand	Angkor Mingxo; Laos
Flyweight; 51 kg	Nguyễn Thị Tuyết Mai; Vietnam	Konnika Nuanboriboon; Thailand	Preciosa Ocaya; Philippines
Bantamweight; 54 kg	Wanlaya Pongta; Thailand	Phan Thị Ngọc Linh; Vietnam	Ana Marie Rey; Philippines
Featherweight; 57 kg	Paylor Xaypao; Laos	Trần Thị Hương; Vietnam	Dueannapa Khongfueang; Thailand
