= Michelle Koh =

Malaysian professional golfer

Personal information
- Nationality: Malaysia
- Born: 30 September 1990 (age 36)
- Height: 5 ft 7 in (170 cm)

Career
- Sport: Golf
- College: Campbell University
- Turned professional: 2014
- Current tour: China LPGA Tour
- Professional wins: 2
Medal record
Southeast Asian Games
Bronze medal – third place	2009 Vientiane	Women's Team

Michelle Koh (born 30 September 1990) is a Malaysian professional golfer who qualified for the 2016 Summer Olympics in Rio de Janeiro, Brazil.

== Career ==
In college, Koh competed for Campbell University.

Koh was part of the women's team in the 2009 Southeast Asian Games that won a bronze medal.

She won the 2015 CTBC Shanghai Ladies Classic on the China LPGA Tour.

== Amateur wins ==
- 2012 Warren-Ford Amateur Open
- 2013 Warren-Ford Amateur Open, China Amateur, Selangor Amateur Open
- 2014 MGA National Trial, Malaysian Amateur Close, Mazda Pahang Amateur Open Championship

== Professional wins ==
- 2015 CTBC Shanghai Ladies Classic (China LPGA Tour)
- 2016 Kenda Tires TLPGA Open (Taiwan LPGA Tour)
