= Nuttapong Ketin =

Thai swimmer (born 1992)

Personal information
- Native name: ณัฐพงษ์ เกษอินทร์
- National team: Thailand
- Born: 24 September 1992 (age 33) Chiang Mai, Thailand

Sport
- Sport: Swimming
Medal record
Representing Thailand
Men's swimming
Asian Championships
Bronze medal – third place	2012 Dubai	200 m backstroke
Southeast Asian Games
Gold medal – first place	2009 Vientiane	200 m breaststroke
Gold medal – first place	2011 Palembang	100 m breaststroke
Gold medal – first place	2011 Palembang	200 m breaststroke
Gold medal – first place	2011 Palembang	200 m medley
Gold medal – first place	2013 Naypyidaw	200 m breaststroke
Gold medal – first place	2017 Kuala Lumpur	200 m breaststroke
Gold medal – first place	2019 Philippines	200 m breaststroke
Silver medal – second place	2009 Vientiane	200 m medley
Silver medal – second place	2009 Vientiane	400 m medley
Silver medal – second place	2013 Naypyidaw	400 m medley
Bronze medal – third place	2013 Naypyidaw	200 m medley

Nuttapong Ketin (Thai: ณัฐพงษ์ เกษอินทร์; born 24 September 1992 in Chiang Mai, Thailand) is a Thai swimmer. He competed at the 2012 Summer Olympics in the 200m breaststroke and 200m individual medley events. He competed 3 times of Asian games in the 2010 Guangzhou, China, in the 2014 Incheon, South Korea, in the 2018 Jakarta, Indonesia. He competed and got Gold-medalist in many Sea games championship.

Olympic Games
Preceded by Worapoj Petchkoom	Flagbearer for Thailand; London 2012	Succeeded by Ratchanok Intanon
