= Finswimming at the 2009 SEA Games =

The finswimming events at the 2009 SEA Games were held from 15 December to 17 December in Vientiane, Laos. The Events were held at the Aquatic Center of the National Sports Complex.

== Medal summary ==
* Host nation (Laos)

Rank	Nation	Gold	Silver	Bronze	Total
1	Vietnam	8	8	3	19
2	Indonesia	3	5	6	14
3	Laos*	3	0	4	7
4	Thailand	2	3	3	8
Totals (4 entries)		16	16	16	48

== Events ==
=== Men ===
==== 50m surface ====
- December 16 - FINAL
- FINAL

Rank	Lane	Swimmer	NOC	Time	Note
1st place, gold medalist(s)	4	Phan Luu Cam Thanh	(Vietnam)	00:16.18	GR
2nd place, silver medalist(s)	6	Muhammad Nurul Fajri	(Indonesia)	00:17.35	
3rd place, bronze medalist(s)	3	Phothone Lounyalath	(Laos)	00:20.69	

==== 100m surface ====
- December 15 - FINAL
- FINAL

Rank	Lane	Swimmer	NOC	Time	Note
1st place, gold medalist(s)	4	Nguyen Trung Kien	(Vietnam)	00:38.07	GR
2nd place, silver medalist(s)	6	Vo Quang Dai	(Vietnam)	00:39.34	
3rd place, bronze medalist(s)	5	Adrian Sansoldi Amano	(Indonesia)	00:39.52	
4	2	Sukirin Udomwongs	(Thailand)	00:39.59	
5	3	Sirasit Chuenpanitchayakul	(Thailand)	00:41.68	

==== 200m surface ====
- (gold) - Bounthanom Vongphachani ( Laos (LAO))
- (silver) - Nguyen Hoan Hao ( Vietnam (VIE))
- (bronze) - Petrol Apostle Kambey ( Indonesia (INA))

==== 400m surface ====
- December 15 - FINAL
- FINAL

Rank	Lane	Swimmer	NOC	Time	Note
1st place, gold medalist(s)	4	Tram Bao Thu	(Vietnam)	03:12.60	GR
2nd place, silver medalist(s)	6	Bui Dinh Kha	(Vietnam)	03:17.43	
3rd place, bronze medalist(s)	5	Hans Hafner Yosaputra	(Indonesia)	03:17.56	
4	2	Panjapol Kongkhieo	(Thailand)	03:22.36	
5	3	Nuttapong Trachuwanich	(Thailand)	03:28.78	

==== 800m Surface ====
- (gold) - Hans Hafner Yosaputra ( Indonesia (INA))
- (silver) - Pham Van Tien ( Vietnam (VIE))
- (bronze) - Petrol Apostle Kambey ( Indonesia (INA))

==== 100m bi-fins ====
- December 16 - FINAL
- FINAL

Rank	Lane	Swimmer	NOC	Time	Note
1st place, gold medalist(s)	4	Nguyen Nhat Tu	(Vietnam)	00:44.71	
2nd place, silver medalist(s)	3	Wesshasartar Nutt	(Thailand)	00:45.16	
3rd place, bronze medalist(s)	2	Bayu Adiwibowo	(Indonesia)	00:47.26	
4	6	Sorasit Hanwiwattanakul	(Thailand)	00:47.44	
5	5	Nguyen Trung Kien	(Vietnam)	00:47.57	

==== 4 x 100m surface ====
- December 15 - FINAL
- FINAL

Rank	Lane	Nation	Time	Notes
1st place, gold medalist(s)	4	Vietnam (VIE)	02:36.01	GR
2nd place, silver medalist(s)	3	Indonesia (INA)	02:38.06	GR
3rd place, bronze medalist(s)	5	Thailand (THA)	02:41.29	GR

==== 4 x 100m bi-fins ====
Rank	Lane	Nation	Time	Notes
1st place, gold medalist(s)	5	Thailand (THA)	03:06.67	
2nd place, silver medalist(s)	4	Vietnam (VIE)	03:22.02	
3rd place, bronze medalist(s)	3	Laos (LAO)	03:45.47	

=== Women ===
==== 50m surface ====
- December 16 - FINAL
- FINAL

Rank	Lane	Swimmer	NOC	Time	Note
1st place, gold medalist(s)	3	Chrichina Sindara	(Laos)	00:22.10	
2nd place, silver medalist(s)	5	Angeline Soegianto	(Indonesia)	00:22.51	
3rd place, bronze medalist(s)	4	Le Thi Nhu Hoai	(Vietnam)	00:22.87	

==== 100m surface ====
- December 15 - FINAL
- FINAL

Rank	Lane	Swimmer	NOC	Time	Note
1st place, gold medalist(s)	4	Duong Huyen Trang	(Vietnam)	00:43.58	GR
2nd place, silver medalist(s)	5	Hoang Thu Phuong	(Vietnam)	00:44.20	GR
3rd place, bronze medalist(s)	7	Thida Tonpongsathorn	(Thailand)	00:46.24	GR
4	3	Arisa Wanteh	(Thailand)	00:46.27	GR
5	6	Vilayphone Vongphachanh	(Laos)	00:56.64	
6	2	Soulamphone Keuthla	(Laos)	00:56.64	

==== 200m surface ====
- (gold) - Nguyen Thi Quynh ( Vietnam (VIE))
- (silver) - Angeline Soegianto ( Indonesia (INA))
- (bronze) - Chu Thi Minh Thuy ( Vietnam (VIE))

==== 400m surface ====
- December 16 - FINAL
- FINAL

Rank	Lane	Swimmer	NOC	Time	Note
1st place, gold medalist(s)	6	Amdavanh Phanmibounkong	(Laos)	04:15.29	
2nd place, silver medalist(s)	5	Livia Iriana	(Indonesia)	04:16.50	
3rd place, bronze medalist(s)	4	Vo Thi Kieu	(Vietnam)	04:20.16	

==== 800m Surface ====
- December 15 - FINAL
- FINAL

Rank	Lane	Swimmer	NOC	Time	Note
1st place, gold medalist(s)	5	Priscillia Gunawan	(Indonesia)	07:23.53	GR
2nd place, silver medalist(s)	4	Nguyen Thi Thuong	(Vietnam)	08:01.05	
3rd place, bronze medalist(s)	6	Amdavanh Phanmibounkong	(Laos)	08:45.46	

==== 100m bi-fins ====
- December 16 - FINAL
- FINAL

Rank	Lane	Swimmer	NOC	Time	Note
1st place, gold medalist(s)	6	Margaretha Herawati	(Indonesia)	00:51.55	
2nd place, silver medalist(s)	3	Kakkanang Prapaisub	(Thailand)	00:52.75	
3rd place, bronze medalist(s)	5	Natanong Butthajorn	(Thailand)	00:53.19	
4	4	Luu Thi Phuong	(Vietnam)	00:53.29	

==== 4 x 100m surface ====
- December 15 - FINAL
- FINAL

Rank	Lane	Nation	Time	Notes
1st place, gold medalist(s)	4	Vietnam (VIE)	03:02.31	
2nd place, silver medalist(s)	3	Thailand (THA)	03:08.56	
3rd place, bronze medalist(s)	5	Indonesia (INA)	03:09.38	

==== 4 x 100m bi-fins ====
- (gold) - Lane 3 - Thailand (THA) - 03:35.06
- (silver) - Lane 4 - Vietnam (VIE) - 03:38.88
- (bronze) - Lane 5 - Laos (LAO) - 04:22.05

Preceded by 2003	Finswimming at the Southeast Asian Games; 2009 Southeast Asian Games	Succeeded by 2011
