= Pétanque at the 2009 SEA Games =

Petanque at the 2009 SEA Games

Pétanque at the 2009 SEA Games took place at National University of Lao Petanque Court, Dongdok (Vientiane), Laos.

== Medalists ==
=== Men ===
Event	Gold	Silver	Bronze
Singles	Sok Chanmean; Cambodia	Mohd Firdaus Adli; Malaysia	Pakin Phukram; Thailand
Singles	Sok Chanmean; Cambodia	Mohd Firdaus Adli; Malaysia	Phonepasert Soukkhaphon; Laos
Doubles	Thailand; Supan Thongphoo; Virapong Wanta	Vietnam; Nguyễn Văn Dũng; Võ Đình Dũng	Malaysia; Mohd Faiza Mohamad; Shaari Hassan
Doubles	Thailand; Supan Thongphoo; Virapong Wanta	Vietnam; Nguyễn Văn Dũng; Võ Đình Dũng	Laos; Ounhuen Detsanghan; Southinanong Phip
Triples	Laos; Saysamone Sengdao; Somok Lengsavath; Sonexay Manyvanh	Vietnam; Danh Sa Phanl; Lê Minh Hải; Nguyễn Tấn Tài	Cambodia; Chao Ratana; Kim Vanna; So Randyne
Triples	Laos; Saysamone Sengdao; Somok Lengsavath; Sonexay Manyvanh	Vietnam; Danh Sa Phanl; Lê Minh Hải; Nguyễn Tấn Tài	Thailand; Kittipat Incharoen; Sarawut Suknoon; Suksan Piachan
Precision shooting	Heng Than; Cambodia	Nuzul Azwan Temizi; Malaysia	Sarawut Suknoon; Thailand
Precision shooting	Heng Than; Cambodia	Nuzul Azwan Temizi; Malaysia	Trần Anh Ngọc; Vietnam

=== Women ===
Event	Gold	Silver	Bronze
Singles	Nguyễn Thị Hiền; Vietnam	Ouk Sreymom; Cambodia	Suphannee Wongsut; Thailand
Singles	Nguyễn Thị Hiền; Vietnam	Ouk Sreymom; Cambodia	Souksakhone Sengch; Laos
Doubles	Laos; Manyvanh Souliya; Noytavanh Pasert	Thailand; Kannika Limwanich; Nattaya Yoothong	Cambodia; Duong Dina; Ke Leng
Doubles	Laos; Manyvanh Souliya; Noytavanh Pasert	Thailand; Kannika Limwanich; Nattaya Yoothong	Vietnam; Trần Thị Phương Em; Trịnh Thị Kim Thanh
Triples	Thailand; Cheeraean Kallaya; Janjira Hansuwan; Phantipha Wongchuvej	Vietnam; Cao Thi Thi Ngan; Nguyễn Thị Trang; Nguyen Thi Viet	Laos; Anhsany Dalavanh; Mimi Vongsavath; Odet Somsouk
Triples	Thailand; Cheeraean Kallaya; Janjira Hansuwan; Phantipha Wongchuvej	Vietnam; Cao Thi Thi Ngan; Nguyễn Thị Trang; Nguyen Thi Viet	Cambodia; Keo Sovanna; Nop Chhalika; Oum Chantrea
Precision shooting	Pacharin Sanjumna; Thailand	Khounkham Souksava; Laos	Em Piseth; Cambodia
Precision shooting	Pacharin Sanjumna; Thailand	Khounkham Souksava; Laos	Nguyễn Thị Ngọc Bích; Vietnam

=== Mixed ===
Event	Gold	Silver	Bronze
Doubles	Thailand; Ekkasit Phadungsap; Taddaw Pundech	Cambodia; Duong Dina; Or Chan Daren	Vietnam; Huỳnh Công Tâm; Vũ Thị Thu
Doubles	Thailand; Ekkasit Phadungsap; Taddaw Pundech	Cambodia; Duong Dina; Or Chan Daren	Laos; Chansamone Vongsay; Vatthanaxay Khamph
Triples (1 man & 2 women)	Thailand; Ekkalak Kedkratok; Nittaya Chumjai; Sujittra Chuamung	Vietnam; Nguyễn Thị Trúc Mai; Nguyễn Thị Thi; Vũ Khang Duy	Laos; Khampasay Tulachak; Manyvanh Boutsaba; Phonexay Douangmi
Triples (1 man & 2 women)	Thailand; Ekkalak Kedkratok; Nittaya Chumjai; Sujittra Chuamung	Vietnam; Nguyễn Thị Trúc Mai; Nguyễn Thị Thi; Vũ Khang Duy	Cambodia; Khem Sopheak; Paou Chhouk Rath; Un Sreya
Triples (1 woman & 2 men)	Vietnam; Lê Hồng Phước; Phan Thị Thúy Diễm; Võ Tân Xuân	Cambodia; Heng Tha; Songvat Chakriya; Ya Chandararith	Thailand; Mongkon Buakaew; Payungpon K. Pornthip Bunphet
Triples (1 woman & 2 men)	Vietnam; Lê Hồng Phước; Phan Thị Thúy Diễm; Võ Tân Xuân	Cambodia; Heng Tha; Songvat Chakriya; Ya Chandararith	Philippines; Aristide Samia; Arinulfo Masumbol; Mary Grace Munar

== Medal tally ==
* Host nation (Laos)

Rank	Nation	Gold	Silver	Bronze	Total
1	Thailand	5	1	5	11
2	Vietnam	2	4	4	10
3	Cambodia	2	3	5	10
4	Laos*	2	1	6	9
5	Malaysia	0	2	1	3
6	Philippines	0	0	1	1
Totals (6 entries)		11	11	22	44

== Sources ==
1. https://issuu.com/manolimpik/docs/medallist_laos2009
2. https://web.archive.org/web/20161220094936/http://www.seagfoffice.org/pdf/pdf_1450241543_139.pdf
3. Article title^{[usurped]}
4. http://wikimapia.org/12988382/25th-SEA-Games-Laos-Vientiane-2009-Petanque-Court-National-University-of-Lao-Dongdok
5. https://www.youtube.com/watch?v=uPxATbJdnL4
6. https://www.youtube.com/watch?v=xz1supmGnoo
7. https://www.youtube.com/watch?v=RDuLsp0etdU
8. http://www.phnompenhpost.com/sport/sea-games-medalists-return
9. http://www.phnompenhpost.com/sport/mixed-fortunes-25th-sea-games
10. http://en.baomoi.com/Info/Vietnam-now-in-1st-place-at-SEA-Games/10/27744.epi
