= Kelly Tan =

Malaysian professional golfer

Personal information
- Nationality: Malaysia
- Born: 26 October 1993 (age 33) Batu Pahat, Johor, Malaysia
- Height: 5 ft 5 in (165 cm)

Career
- Sport: Golf
- Turned professional: 2013
- Current tour: LPGA Tour
- Former tour: Symetra Tour
- Professional wins: 1

Number of wins by tour
- Epson Tour: 1

Best results in LPGA major championships
- Chevron Championship: T37: 2020
- Women's PGA C'ship: T13: 2020
- U.S. Women's Open: T32: 2016
- Women's British Open: CUT: 2015, 2016, 2020, 2022
- Evian Championship: T43: 2022
Medal record
Southeast Asian Games
Bronze medal – third place	2009 Vientiane	Individual
Bronze medal – third place	2009 Vientiane	Women's Team

Kelly Tan (born 26 October 1993) is a Malaysian professional golfer who competes on the LPGA Tour.

Tan is a former member of the Malaysian junior national team.

Tan earned her LPGA Tour card for 2014 via qualifying school.

Tan qualified for the 2016 Summer Olympics and the 2020 Summer Olympics.

Tan's first professional win came at the 2019 Florida's Natural Charity Classic on the Symetra Tour.

== Amateur wins ==
- 2010 Selangor Amateur, Sarawak Amateur, Asian Schools Games
- 2011 Selangor Amateur Open, Malaysian Ladies Amateur
- 2012 Sabah Amateur Open, Santi Cup, Johor Amateur Open, TSM Challenge
- 2013 Sarawak Amateur, Malaysian Amateur Open

== Professional wins ==
=== Symetra Tour wins ===
- 2019 Florida's Natural Charity Classic

== Results in LPGA majors ==
Results not in chronological order.

Tournament	2014	2015	2016	2017	2018	2019	2020	2021	2022	2023	2024	2025
Chevron Championship			T50				T37	T63	CUT	CUT		
U.S. Women's Open	CUT		T32				CUT	CUT				CUT
Women's PGA Championship	CUT	T53	T30	CUT			T13	CUT	T40			
The Evian Championship	CUT	T70	CUT				NT		T43			
Women's British Open		CUT	CUT				CUT		CUT			

Did not play

CUT = missed the half-way cut
NT = no tournament
T = tied

=== Summary ===
Tournament	Wins	2nd	3rd	Top-5	Top-10	Top-25	Events	Cuts made
Chevron Championship	0	0	0	0	0	0	5	3
U.S. Women's Open	0	0	0	0	0	0	5	1
Women's PGA Championship	0	0	0	0	0	1	7	4
The Evian Championship	0	0	0	0	0	0	4	2
Women's British Open	0	0	0	0	0	0	4	0
Totals	0	0	0	0	0	1	25	10

== Team appearances ==
- Espirito Santo Trophy (representing Malaysia): 2012
