= Philippines at the 2009 SEA Games =

Philippines at the 2009 Southeast Asian Games
- IOC code: PHI
- NOC: Philippine Olympic Committee
- Website: www.olympic.ph (in English)

in Vientiane
- Flag bearer: Annie Albania (Boxing)
- Medals Ranked 5th: Gold 38 Silver 35 Bronze 50 Total 123

Southeast Asian Games appearances (overview)
- 1977; 1979; 1981; 1983; 1985; 1987; 1989; 1991; 1993; 1995; 1997; 1999; 2001; 2003; 2005; 2007; 2009; 2011; 2013; 2015; 2017; 2019; 2021; 2023; 2025; 2027; 2029

The Philippines participated at the 25th Southeast Asian Games held in Vientiane, Laos from 9 December to 18 December 2009.

== Preparations ==
The Philippine team trained locally. It made plans for national athletes for the 3 remaining months before the 2009 Southeast Asian Games. According to news reports, the Philippine national team lacked funding from the government but still hoped to achieve a good training program for its athletes. Harry Angping, the PSC Chairman, wanted to send the country's athletes to China, a world sports superpower, to have an intensive training which could boost the skills of the athletes, especially members of the Philippine volleyball, diving, shooting, cycling and weightlifting teams.

The country looked after its gold and silver medallists at the latest SEAG, which was held in 2007, although some of them had already retired.

The country was said to have a strong national presence in the sport of billiards and snooker, which includes former and current world champions such as Efren Reyes, Ronato Alcano, Alex Pagulayan and Rubilen Amit. Another powerhouse team in the Philippine national team is swimming. It was said that the swimming team was almost composed of its Olympian tankers like Miguel Molina, Ryan Arabejo, James Walsh, Daniel Coakley, Christel Simms and Erica Totten.

== Expectations ==
The country hoped to rebound from its worst finish in SEAG the last 2 years. The country placed sixth overall with 42 golds, 91 silvers and 96 bronzes. The country hoped to regain the overall championship from Thailand, even though it really had a tough way. The country was at that point still unsure of how many gold medals the athletes could garner, since the number of athletes joining the international competition was still undetermined, although some of the athletes, such as Nathaniel Padilla, Shiela Mae Perez, Hidilyn Diaz, Rexel Ryan Fabriga, Willy Wang and Miguel Molina, were accounted for.

The country sent one of its lowest numbers of delegates, which was 153 and officials, which was 47, although this was not a final count according to POC.. Still, the number of athletes and officials to be sent in this SEAG edition was just 1/3 of the number of delegates sent in the 2007 SEAG; it was known that the Philippine team was still a powerhouse team because all of the included athletes in the list were gold and silver medalists in the 2007 SEAG and 2008 Beijing Olympians. The PSC promised to boost the earnings of the athletes who would get gold medals for the country at the SEAG.

== Medalists ==
=== Gold ===
No.	Medal	Name	Sport	Event
1	Gold	Jennifer Dy Chan	Archery	Women's individual compound
2	Gold	Rene Herrera	Athletics	Men's 3000m Steeplechase
3	Gold	Eduardo Buenavista	Athletics	Men's Marathon
4	Gold	Arniel Ferrera	Athletics	Men's hammer throw
5	Gold	Danilo Fresnido	Athletics	Men's javelin throw
6	Gold	Jho-An Banayag	Athletics	Women's Marathon
7	Gold	Marestella Torres	Athletics	Women's long jump
8	Gold	Rosie Villarito	Athletics	Women's javelin throw
9	Gold	Ronato Alcano	Billiards	Men's 8-ball Pool Singles
10	Gold	Rubilen Amit	Billiards	Women's 8-ball Pool Singles
11	Gold	Rubilen Amit	Billiards	Women's 9-ball Pool Singles
12	Gold	Vicera Bill	Boxing	Men's Pinweight 45kg
13	Gold	Charly Suarez	Boxing	Men's Featherweight 57kg
14	Gold	Josie Gabuco	Boxing	Women's Pinweight 46kg
15	Gold	Alice Aparri	Boxing	Women's light flyweight 48kg
16	Gold	Albania Annie	Boxing	Women's Flyweight 51kg
17	Gold	Chihiro Ikeda	Golf	Women's individual
18	Gold	Chihiro Ikeda; Mia Piccio; Dottie Ardina	Golf	Women's team
19	Gold	John Baylon	Judo	Men's 73-81kg
20	Gold	Nancy Quillotes	Judo	Women's 40-45kg
21	Gold	Marna Pabillore	Karate	Women's kumite 55kg
22	Gold	Zaidi Laruan	Muay Lao	Men's Lightweight 60kg
23	Gold	Nathaniel Padilla	Shooting	Men's 25m Rapid Fire Pistol
24	Gold	Daniel Coakley	Swimming	Men's 50m freestyle
25	Gold	Ryan Arabejo	Swimming	Men's 1500m freestyle
26	Gold	Miguel Molina	Swimming	Men's 200m individual medley
27	Gold	Miguel Molina	Swimming	Men's 400m individual medley
28	Gold	Tshomlee Go	Taekwondo	Men's 68kg
29	Gold	Alexander Briones	Taekwondo	Men's +87kg
30	Gold	Mary Antoinette Rivero	Taekwondo	Women's 67kg
31	Gold	Janice Lagman; Camille Alarilla; Rani Ann Ortega	Taekwondo	Women's team poomsae
32	Gold	Cecil Mamiit; Treat Conrad Huey; Johnny Arcilla; Patrick Tierro	Tennis	Men's team
33	Gold	Cecil Mamiit	Tennis	Men's singles
34	Gold	Jimmy Angana	Wrestling	Men's freestyle 60-66kg
35	Gold	Jason Balabal	Wrestling	Men's freestyle 74-84kg
36	Gold	Margarito Angana	Wrestling	Men's Greco-Roman 55kg
37	Gold	Mark Eddiva	Wushu	Men's Sanshou 65kg
38	Gold	Marianne Mariano	Wushu	Women's Sanshou 60kg

=== Silver ===
No.	Medal	Name	Sport	Event
1	Silver	Jobert Delicano	Athletics	Men's long jump
2	Silver	Mercedita Fetalvero	Athletics	Women's 10000m
3	Silver	Narcisa Atienza	Athletics	Women's Heptathlon
4	Silver	Gandy Valle	Billiards	Men's 8-ball Pool Singles
5	Silver	Harry Tañamor	Boxing	Men's light flyweight 48kg
6	Silver	Nino Caro	Diving	Men's 3m springboard
7	Silver	Nino Caro; Zardo Domenios	Diving	Men's 10m Synchronized Springboard
8	Silver	Jaime Asok; Ryan Fabriga	Diving	Men's 10m Synchronized Platform
9	Silver	Sheila Mae Perez	Diving	Women's 3m springboard
10	Silver	Ruth Dugaduga	Judo	Women's 70-78kg
11	Silver	Rolando Lagman	Karate	Men's kumite 75kg
12	Silver	Lutche Metante	Karate	Women's kumite +68kg
13	Silver	Roland Claro	Muay Lao	Men's light flyweight 48kg
14	Silver	Romnick Pabalate	Muay Lao	Men's Flyweight 51kg
15	Silver	Jonathan Polosan	Muay Lao	Men's Light Welterweight 63.5kg
16	Silver	Nur Habir Isnani	Pencak silat	Men's tarung Class I 85-90kg
17	Silver	Charles Walker	Swimming	Men's 100m freestyle
18	Silver	Miguel Molina	Swimming	Men's 200m Freestlye
19	Silver	Ryan Arabejo	Swimming	Men's 400m Freestlye
20	Silver	Ryan Arabejo	Swimming	Men's 200m backstroke
21	Silver	Miguel Molina; Charles Walker; Daniel Coakley; Kendrick Uy	Swimming	Men's 4x100m freestyle relay
22	Silver	Miguel Molina; Charles Walker; Jessie Lacuna; Ryan Arabejo	Swimming	Men's 4x200m freestyle relay
23	Silver	John Paul Lizardo	Taekwondo	Men's 54kg
24	Silver	Marlon Avenido	Taekwondo	Men's 80kg
25	Silver	Kathleen Alora	Taekwondo	Women's 53kg
26	Silver	Kirstie Alora	Taekwondo	Women's +73kg
27	Silver	Treat Conrad Huey; Johnny Arcilla; Patrick Tierro	Tennis	Men's singles
28	Silver	Cecil Mamiit; Treat Conrad Huey	Tennis	Men's doubles
29	Silver	Riza Zalameda; Denise Dy	Tennis	Women's doubles
30	Silver	Philippines	Water Polo	Men's team
31	Silver	Joselito Padilla	Weightlifting	Men's +94kg
32	Silver	Paulo delos Santos	Wrestling	Men's freestyle -50kg
33	Silver	Michael Baletin	Wrestling	Men's Greco-Roman 74kg
34	Silver	Benjie Rivera	Wushu	Men's Sanshou 56kg
35	Silver	Mary Jane Estimar	Wushu	Women's Sanshou 52kg

=== Bronze ===
No.	Medal	Name	Sport	Event
1	Bronze	Earl Benjamin Yap	Archery	Men's individual compound
2	Bronze	Julius Sermona	Athletics	Men's 5000m
3	Bronze	Henry Dagmil	Athletics	Men's long jump
4	Bronze	Joebert Delicano	Athletics	Men's triple jump
5	Bronze	Mercedita Fetalvero	Athletics	Women's 5000m
6	Bronze	Dennis Orcollo	Billiards	Men's 9-ball Pool Singles
7	Bronze	Iris Ranola	Billiards	Women's 9-ball Pool Singles
8	Bronze	Saludar Rey	Boxing	Men's Flyweight 51kg
9	Bronze	Joegin Landon	Boxing	Men's Light Welterweight 64kg
10	Bronze	Mitchel Matinez	Boxing	Women's Featherweight 57kg
11	Bronze	Ryan Fabriga	Diving	Men's 10m platform
12	Bronze	Mhark Fernando; Antonio Asistio II; Jhonnel Ababa; Jude Estaquio	Golf	Men's team
13	Bronze	Gilbert Ramirez	Judo	Men's 66-73kg
14	Bronze	Ric Senales	Judo	Men's 81-90kg
15	Bronze	Helen Dawa	Judo	Women's 45-48kg
16	Bronze	Karen Ann Solomon	Judo	Women's 63-70kg
17	Bronze	Noel Espinosa	Karate	Men's individual Kata
18	Bronze	Ace Pediongo Eso	Karate	Men's kumite 55kg
19	Bronze	Philippines	Karate	Men's team kumite
20	Bronze	Harold Gregorio	Muay Lao	Men's welterweight 67kg
21	Bronze	May Libao	Muay Lao	Women's Pinweight 45kg
22	Bronze	Maricel Subang	Muay Lao	Women's light flyweight 48kg
23	Bronze	Preciosa Ocaya	Muay Lao	Women's Flyweight 51kg
24	Bronze	Ana Marie Rey	Muay Lao	Women's Bantamweight 54kg
25	Bronze	Marniel Dimia	Pencak silat	Men's tarung Class F 70-75kg
26	Bronze	Aristide Samia; Arinulfo Masumbol; Mary Grace Munar	Petanque	Triples (1 Woman & 2 Men)
27	Bronze	Metodio Suico Jr. Quirante Marbie; Gene Mark Saavedra	Sepak Takraw	Men's regu
28	Bronze	Metodio Suico Jr. Junmar Aleta; Gene Mark Saavedra	Sepak Takraw	Men's doubles
29	Bronze	Metodio Suico Jr. Danilo Alipan; Joel Carbonilla; Harrison Castanares; Jerome Vendionla; Hector Memarion	Sepak Takraw	Men's Hoop
30	Bronze	Deseree Autor; Irene Apdon; Gelyn Evora; Sara Jean Catain; Rhea Padrigo	Sepak Takraw	Women's Hoop
31	Bronze	Miguel Molina; Charles Walker; Jessie Lacuna; James Walsh	Swimming	Men's 4x100m medley relay
32	Bronze	Richard Gonzales	Table tennis	Men's singles
33	Bronze	Jeffrey Figueroa	Taekwondo	Men's 60kg
34	Bronze	Jyra Lizardo	Taekwondo	Women's 49kg
35	Bronze	Jean Pierre Sabido; Rani Ann Ortega	Taekwondo	Mixed Pair Poomsae
36	Bronze	Anthony Ray Castillo; Brian Alan Sabido; Jean Pierre Sabido	Taekwondo	Men's team poomsae
37	Bronze	Riza Zalameda; Denise Dy; Marichris Gentz	Tennis	Women's team
38	Bronze	Denise Dy	Tennis	Women's singles
39	Bronze	Riza Zalameda	Tennis	Women's singles
40	Bronze	Denise Dy; Cecil Mamiit	Tennis	Mixed doubles
41	Bronze	Riza Zalameda; Treat Conrad Huey	Tennis	Mixed doubles
42	Bronze	Renante Briones	Weightlifting	Men's 94kg
43	Bronze	Jerry Angana	Wrestling	Men's freestyle 50-55kg
44	Bronze	Roque Mana-ay	Wrestling	Men's freestyle 55-60kg
45	Bronze	Melchor Tumasis	Wrestling	Men's Greco-Roman 60kg
46	Bronze	Maribel Jambora	Wrestling	Women's -45kg
47	Bronze	Daniel Parantac	Wushu	Men's taolu Taijiquan/Taijijian
48	Bronze	Jessie Aligaga	Wushu	Men's Sanshou 48kg
49	Bronze	Denver Labador	Wushu	Men's Sanshou 60kg
50	Bronze	Rhea May Rifani	Wushu	Women's Sanshou 48kg

== Medal summary ==
=== By sports ===
Rank	Sport	Gold	Silver	Bronze	Total
1	Athletics	7	3	4	14
2	Boxing	5	1	3	9
3	Swimming	4	6	1	11
4	Taekwondo	4	4	4	12
5	Wrestling	3	2	4	9
6	Billiards	3	1	2	6
7	Tennis	2	3	5	10
8	Wushu	2	2	4	8
9	Judo	2	1	4	7
10	Golf	2	0	1	3
11	Muay Thai	1	3	5	9
12	Karate	1	2	3	6
13	Archery	1	0	1	2
14	Shooting	1	0	0	1
15	Diving	0	4	1	5
16	Pencak Silat	0	1	1	2
16	Weightlifting	0	1	1	2
18	Water Polo	0	1	0	1
19	Sepak Takraw	0	0	4	4
20	Pétanque	0	0	1	1
20	Table Tennis	0	0	1	1
Totals (21 entries)		38	35	50	123

== Issues ==
Philippine NSAs still had leadership quarrels, which greatly affected the training of their athletes even though there were only three months left before the national competition.

Lack of government funding was also another factor why Philippine athletes had not been sent to other countries such as China to have an intensive training program.

The national sports strategy prioritised judged sports, like boxing, judo, taekwondo, diving and karate, over objectively measured disciplines such as athletics, shooting, swimming, weightlifting, tennis, table tennis and badminton, which offered a higher number of available medals. Because outcomes in judged sports relied on official scoring rather than quantifiable metrics, results could be susceptible to subjective officiating or judging errors.
