= Cambodia at the 2009 SEA Games =

Cambodia at the 2009 Southeast Asian Games
- IOC code: CAM
- NOC: National Olympic Committee of Cambodia
- Website: www.noccambodia.org

in Vientiane
- Flag bearer: Sok Chanmean (Pétanque)
- Medals Ranked 9th: Gold 3 Silver 10 Bronze 27 Total 40

Southeast Asian Games appearances (overview)
- 1961; 1965; 1967–1981; 1983; 1985; 1987; 1989–1993; 1995; 1997; 1999; 2001; 2003; 2005; 2007; 2009; 2011; 2013; 2015; 2017; 2019; 2021; 2023; 2025; 2027; 2029

Cambodia competed in the 2009 Southeast Asian Games athletics tournament, winning three gold medals and 40 medals in total.

== Preparations ==
Cambodia only announced the formation of its National Team Organizing Committee for the SEA Games in mid-October 2009, less than two months ahead of the start of the Games in Vientiane, Laos. The National Olympic Committee of Cambodia (NOCC) assigned its Vice President Bun Sok to chair this committee.

This committee was made up of representatives of various Olympic sports federations and was responsible for final screening and selection of athletes to represent Cambodia in various sports. Cambodia was to compete in 17 sports, with expectations of medals in pétanque, athletics, tennis, wrestling, boxing, taekwondo and beach volleyball. As part of the preparation for 2009 SEA Games, the athletics and taekwondo athletes traveled to South Korea to undergo intensive training courtesy of the Incheon City of Korea Support Program, while other athletes were to complete training in Vietnam.

The Phnom Penh Post reported that, according to Nhan Sokvisal, the SEA Games coordinator, Cambodia was looking forward and optimistic to better their medals haul from the last SEA Games in Thailand in 2007. In the 2007 Games, Cambodia won 19 metals - two gold, five silver and 12 bronze.

Cambodian Prime Minister Hun Sen confirmed his presence at the Opening Ceremony after Laotian Prime Minister Bouasone Bouphavanh's visit to Cambodia in late November.

== Medalists ==
Medal	Name	Sport	Event
Gold	Sok Chanmean	Pétanque	Men's Single
Gold	Heng Than	Pétanque	Men's Precision Shooting
Gold	Chov Sotheara	Wrestling	Women's <45 kg
Silver	Phal Sophat	Boxing	Men's Feather Weight - 57 kg
Silver	Chhoy Bouthorn	Taekwondo	Men's 58 kg
Silver	So Naro	Taekwondo	Men's 87 kg
Silver	Seon Elit	Taekwondo	Men's >87 kg
Silver	Ouk Sreymom	Pétanque	Women's Single
Silver	Duong Dina; Or Chan Daren	Pétanque	Mixed Double
Silver	Heng Tha; Songvat Chakriya; Ya Chandararith	Pétanque	Mixed Triple (1 Woman & 2 Men)
Silver	Chum Chivinn	Wrestling	Men's 96–120 kg Freestyle
Silver	Chum Chivinn	Wrestling	Men's 120 kg Greco-Roman
Silver	Try Sothavy	Wrestling	Women's 51–55 kg
Bronze	Hem Bunting	Athletics	Men's Marathon
Bronze	Ven Diaman	Boxing	Men's Pin Weight - 45 kg
Bronze	Svay Ratha	Boxing	Men's Light Welter Weight - 64 kg
Bronze	Hin Saiheng	Boxing	Men's Welter Weight - 69 kg
Bronze	Eh Phuthong	Boxing	Men's Light Heavy Weight - 81 kg
Bronze	Chao Ratana; Kim Vanna; So Randyne	Pétanque	Men's Triple
Bronze	Ke Leng; Duong Dina	Pétanque	Women's Double
Bronze	Anhsany Dalavanh; Mimi Vongsavath; Odet Somsouk	Pétanque	Women's Triple
Bronze	Em Piseth	Pétanque	Women's Precision Shooting
Bronze	Khem Sopheak; Paou Chhouk Rath; Un Sreya	Pétanque	Triple(1 Man & 2 Women)
Bronze	Heng Rawut	Shuttlecock	Men's Singles
Bronze	Soeur Vanmak; Chhin Vitou	Shuttlecock	Men's Doubles
Bronze	Cambodia	Shuttlecock	Men's Team
Bronze	Chea Sreymeas	Shuttlecock	Women's Singles
Bronze	Chea Sreymeas; San Sophorn	Shuttlecock	Women's Doubles
Bronze	Cambodia	Shuttlecock	Women's Team
Bronze	Chhin Vitou; San Sophorn	Shuttlecock	Mixed Doubles
Bronze	Chieung Puthearim	Taekwondo	Women's 57 kg
Bronze	Cheang Bunna	Taekwondo	Women's 62 kg
Bronze	Sorn Davin	Taekwondo	Women's 73 kg
Bronze	Cheat Khemara	Taekwondo	Individual Men Poomsae
Bronze	Tan Nysan	Tennis	Men's singles
Bronze	Dorn Saov	Wrestling	Men's Freestyle 74–84 kg
Bronze	Dorn Saov	Wrestling	Men's Greco-Roman 74 kg
Bronze	Chey Channreaksmey	Wrestling	Women's 48–51 kg
Bronze	Tan Narith	Wushu	Men's sanshou 52 kg
Bronze	Sin Saksunnara	Wushu	Men's sanshou 56 kg
