= Dottie Ardina =

Filipino professional golfer

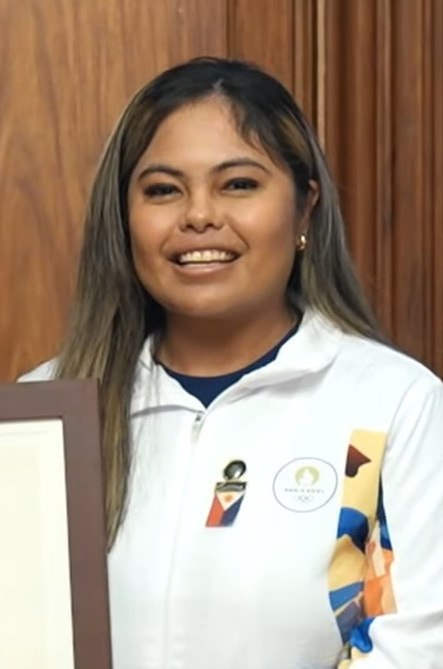
- Ardina in 2024

Personal information
- Nationality: Philippines
- Born: December 2, 1993 (age 32) Calamba, Laguna, Philippines
- Height: 5 ft 2 in (157 cm)

Career
- Sport: Golf
- Turned professional: 2013
- Current tours: LPGA Tour; Epson Tour
- Professional wins: 3

Number of wins by tour
- WPGA Tour of Australasia: 1
- Epson Tour: 1
- Other: 1

Best results in LPGA major championships
- Chevron Championship: DNP
- Women's PGA C'ship: T12: 2021
- U.S. Women's Open: T53: 2023
- Women's British Open: T64: 2020
- Evian Championship: CUT: 2021
Medal record
Southeast Asian Games
Gold medal – first place	2009 Vientiane	Women's team

Dottie Ardina (born December 2, 1993) is a Filipino professional golfer.

== Career ==
Ardina won numerous amateur tournament in Asia and represented the Philippines at the Espirito Santo Trophy (World Amateur Team Championships) in 2006 and 2010. Her 2006 appearance, at age 12, made her the youngest player ever to compete at the World Amateur Team Championships.

Ardina turned professional in 2013.

Ardina has played on the Symetra Tour since 2014. Her best finish on the Symetra Tour was a tie for 2nd at the 2015 Four Winds Invitational. She also played on the LPGA Tour in 2014.

Also in 2014, she won the Thailand Singha-Sat LPGA Championship.

Ardina qualified for the 2016 Summer Olympics in Rio de Janeiro. While initially it was thought she would compete, ultimately she declared herself unable to compete due to the 2015–16 Zika virus epidemic. She would then qualify for the 2024 Summer Olympics in Paris.

== Amateur wins ==
this list may be incomplete

- 2010 Southern Ladies, Karambunai Open
- 2011 Queen Sirikit Cup, Truevisions International Junior, Philippine Closed Match Play, Malaysian Junior Open, Thailand Amateur Open
- 2012 RSGC AmBank Junior Amateur Open, WWWExpress-DHL National Amateur, Philippine Amateur Championship (Closed), Taiwan Amateur, Penang Amateur, SICC DBS Junior Invitational
- 2013 Philippine Amateur Open, WWWExpress-DHL Amateur, TrueVisions International Junior # 12

== Professional wins (3) ==
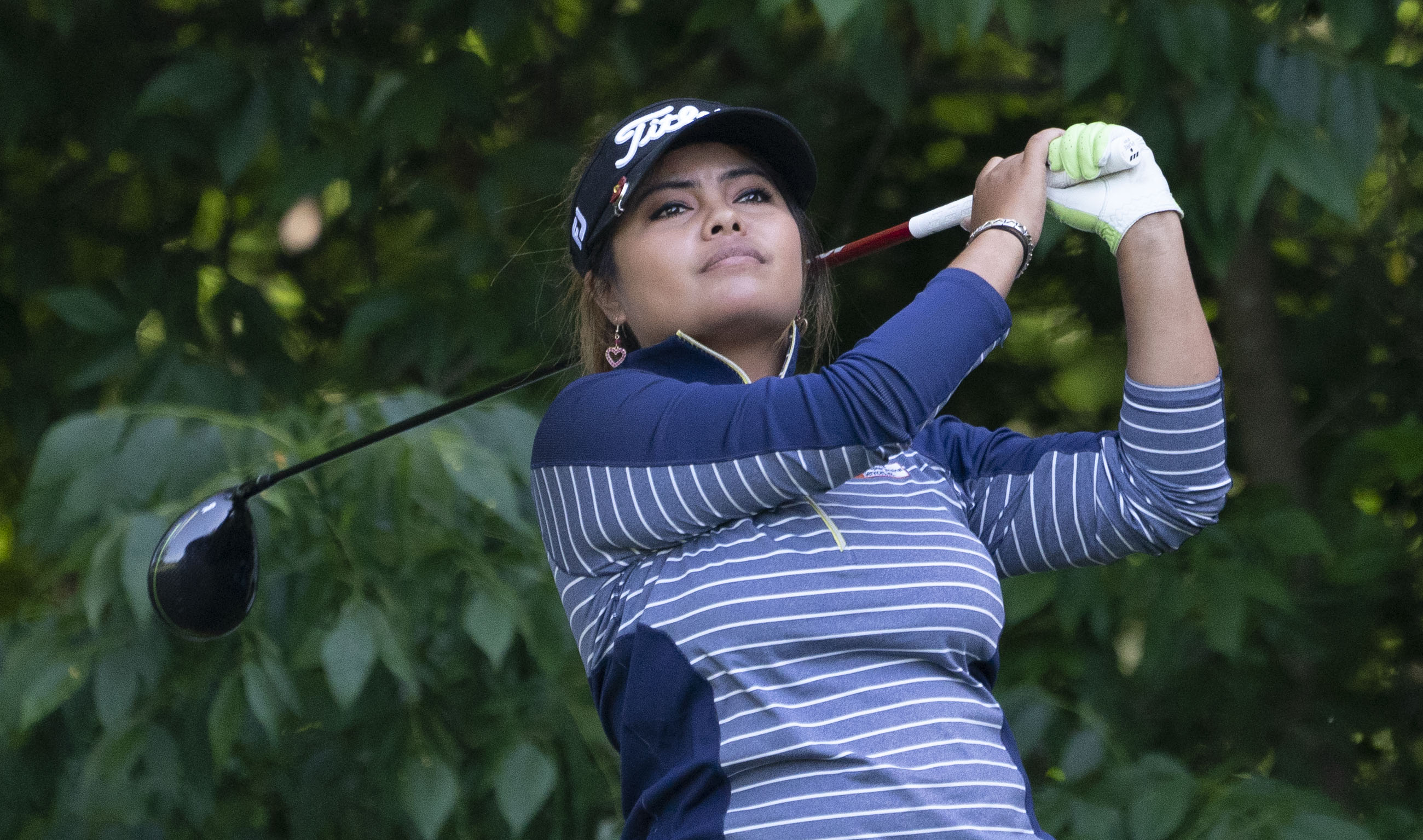
Ardina in 2019.

=== Epson Tour wins (1) ===
No.	Date	Tournament	Winning score	To par	Margin of victory	Runner-up	Winner's share ($)
1	Apr 23, 2022	Copper Rock Championship	73-73-65=211	−5	2 strokes	(Spain) Marta Sanz Barrio, (Israel) Laetitia Beck	30,000

=== WPGA Tour of Australasia wins (1) ===
- 2020 (1) Ballarat Icons Pro-Am

=== Thai LPGA Tour wins (1) ===
- 2014 (1) 3rd Singha-SAT Thai LPGA Championship

== Results in LPGA majors ==
Results not in chronological order.

Tournament	2019	2020	2021	2022	2023	2024	2025
Chevron Championship							
U.S. Women's Open	T62			CUT	T53		CUT
Women's PGA Championship	CUT	CUT	T12	CUT		CUT	
The Evian Championship		NT	CUT				
Women's British Open		T64					

Did not play

CUT = missed the half-way cut
NT = no tournament
T = tied

== Team appearances ==
- Espirito Santo Trophy (representing the Philippines): 2006, 2010, 2012
