= Indonesia at the 2009 SEA Games =

Indonesia at the 2009 Southeast Asian Games
- IOC code: INA
- NOC: Indonesian Olympic Committee
- Website: www.nocindonesia.or.id (in English)

in Vientiane 9 - 18 December 2009
- Competitors: 650
- Flag bearers: I Komang Wahyu Purbayasari (pencak silat)
- Medals Ranked 3rd: Gold 43 Silver 53 Bronze 74 Total 170

Southeast Asian Games appearances (overview)
- 1977; 1979; 1981; 1983; 1985; 1987; 1989; 1991; 1993; 1995; 1997; 1999; 2001; 2003; 2005; 2007; 2009; 2011; 2013; 2015; 2017; 2019; 2021; 2023; 2025; 2027; 2029

Indonesia participated in the 2009 SEA Games in the city of Vientiane, Laos from 9 December 2009 to 18 December 2009.

== Medal tally ==
| Sport | Gold | Silver | Bronze | Total |
|---|---|---|---|---|
| Athletics | 7 | 7 | 7 | 21 |
| Weightlifting | 5 | 1 | 1 | 7 |
| Badminton | 4 | 2 | 2 | 8 |
| Finswimming | 3 | 5 | 6 | 14 |
| Karate | 3 | 3 | 6 | 12 |
| Archery | 3 | 1 | 1 | 5 |
| Cycling | 3 | 1 | 1 | 5 |
| Wushu | 2 | 6 | 3 | 11 |
| Wrestling | 2 | 4 | 6 | 12 |
| Pencak silat | 2 | 3 | 3 | 8 |
| Swimming | 2 | 3 | 2 | 7 |
| Taekwondo | 1 | 3 | 6 | 10 |
| Diving | 1 | 3 | 1 | 5 |
| Tennis | 1 | 2 | 3 | 6 |
| Judo | 1 | 1 | 6 | 8 |
| Shooting | 1 | 1 | 3 | 5 |
| Beach volleyball | 1 | 1 | 0 | 2 |
| Volleyball | 1 | 0 | 1 | 2 |
| Boxing | 0 | 3 | 6 | 9 |
| Billiards and snooker | 0 | 3 | 2 | 5 |
| Sepak takraw | 0 | 0 | 5 | 5 |
| Golf | 0 | 0 | 1 | 1 |
| Table tennis | 0 | 0 | 1 | 1 |
| Water polo | 0 | 0 | 1 | 1 |
| Totals (24 entries) | 43 | 53 | 74 | 170 |

== Medalists ==
| Medal | Name | Sport | Event |
|---|---|---|---|
| Gold | Novia Nuraini | Archery | Women's individual recurve |
| Gold | Ika Yuliana Rochmawati; Novia Nuraini; Rina Dewi Puspitasari | Archery | Women's team recurve |
| Gold | I Gusti Nyoman Puruhito | Archery | Men's individual compound |
| Gold | Suryo Agung Wibowo | Athletics | Men's 100 m |
| Gold | Suryo Agung Wibowo | Athletics | Men's 200 m |
| Gold | Agus Prayogo | Athletics | Men's 10000 m |
| Gold | Triyaningsih | Athletics | Women's 5000 m |
| Gold | Triyaningsih | Athletics | Women's 10000 m |
| Gold | Dedeh Erawati | Athletics | Women's 100 m hurdles |
| Gold | Dwi Ratnawati | Athletics | Women's discus throw |
| Gold | Simon Santoso; Sony Dwi Kuncoro; Tommy Sugiarto; Markis Kido; Hendra Setiawan; Mohammad Ahsan; Bona Septano; Nova Widianto; Devin Lahardi Fitriawan | Badminton | Men's team |
| Gold | Simon Santoso | Badminton | Men's singles |
| Gold | Markis Kido; Hendra Setiawan | Badminton | Mixed doubles |
| Gold | Nova Widianto; Liliyana Natsir | Badminton | Mixed doubles |
| Gold | Andy Ardiyansah; Koko Prasetyo Darkuncoro | Beach volleyball | Men's |
| Gold | Ryan Ariehaan Hilmant | Cycling | Men's 50 km individual time trial |
| Gold | Popo Ariyo Sejati | Cycling | Men's downhill |
| Gold | Risa Suseanty | Cycling | Women's downhill |
| Gold | Noor Husaini; Muhammad Nasrullah | Diving | Men's 10 m synchronized platform |
| Gold | Hans Hafner Yosaputra | Finswimming | Men's 800 m surface |
| Gold | Priscillia Gunawan | Finswimming | Women's 800 m surface |
| Gold | Margaretha Herawati | Finswimming | Women's 100 m bi fins |
| Gold | Krisna Bayu | Judo | Men's 90–100 kg |
| Gold | Faizal Zainuddin | Karate | Men's individual kata |
| Gold | Faizal Zainuddin; Fidelys Lolobua; Aswar | Karate | Men's team kata |
| Gold | Umar Syarief | Karate | Men's kumite +84 kg |
| Gold | Hamdani; Yusuf Efendi | Pencak silat | Men's doubles artistic |
| Gold | I Komang Wahyu Purbayasari | Pencak silat | Men's tarung class E 65–70 kg |
| Gold | Erlinawati Chalid | Shooting | Women's 50 m rifle prone |
| Gold | Glenn Victor Sutanto | Swimming | Men's 100 m backstroke |
| Gold | Guntur Pratama Putra; Indra Gunawan; Glenn Victor Sutanto; Triady Fauzi Sidiq | Swimming | Men's 4x100 m medley relay |
| Gold | Mery Wanda | Taekwondo | Men's 60 kg |
| Gold | Lavinia Tananta | Tennis | Women's singles |
| Gold | Adam; Affan Priyo Wicaksono; Agung Seganti; Andri Widiatmoko; Ayip Rizal; Bagus Wahyu Ardyanto; Didi Irwadi; Fadlan Abdul Karim; I Nyoman Rudi Tirtana; Joni Sugiatno; Muhamad Khasoni Mufid; Muhammad Riviansyah | Volleyball | Men's team |
| Gold | Jadi Setiadi | Weightlifting | Men's 56 kg |
| Gold | Eko Yuli Irawan | Weightlifting | Men's 62 kg |
| Gold | Triyatno | Weightlifting | Men's 69 kg |
| Gold | Raema Lisa Rumbewas | Weightlifting | Women's 58 kg |
| Gold | Okta Dwi Pramita | Weightlifting | Women's 63 kg |
| Gold | Fahriansyah | Wrestling | Men's freestyle 66–74 kg |
| Gold | Ardiansyah | Wrestling | Men's Greco-Roman 50 kg |
| Gold | Aldy Lukman | Wushu | Men's changquan |
| Gold | Susyana Tjhan | Wushu | Women's changquan |
