= 2009 SEA Games =

Multi-sport event in Laos

XXV Southeast Asian Games
- Host city: Vientiane, Laos
- Motto: Generosity, Amity and Healthy Lifestyle (Lao: ຄວາມມີນ້ຳໃຈ ໄມຕີຈິດ ຊີວິດສົດຊື່ນ)
- Nations: 11
- Athletes: 3100
- Events: 372 in 25 sports
- Opening: 9 December 2009
- Closing: 18 December 2009
- Opened by: Choummaly Sayasone; President of Laos
- Athlete's Oath: Mayuly Phanouvong
- Judge's Oath: Somphone Manikham
- Torch lighter: Phoxay Aphailath
- Main venue: New Laos National Stadium
- Website: 2009 Southeast Asian Games

The 2009 Southeast Asian Games (Lao: ກີລາພູມິພາກອາຊີຕາເວັນອອກສຽງໃຕ້ 2009, translit. Kila phoumipak asi taven oak siang tai 2009), officially known as the 25th Southeast Asian Games, were a Southeast Asian multi-sport event hosted by Vientiane, Laos. This was the first time Laos had held the Southeast Asian Games as Laos had previously declined hosting the 1965 Southeast Asian Peninsular Games, citing financial difficulties. This was also the first time the Southeast Asian Games was held in a landlocked country.

The games commemorated 50 years of SEA Games and the main schedule was formally held from 9 to 18 December 2009, with several events had commenced from 2 December 2009. Around 3,100 athletes participated at the event, which featured 372 events in 25 sports. Laos is the ninth nation to host the games after Thailand, Myanmar, Malaysia, Singapore, Indonesia, Philippines, Brunei and Vietnam. It was opened by Choummaly Sayasone, the President of Laos at the New Laos National Stadium.

The final medal tally was led by Thailand, followed by Vietnam and Indonesia with host Laos in seventh place. Several Games and national records were broken during the games.

== Host city ==
During the Southeast Asian Games Federation meeting at the 2003 Southeast Asian Games in Vietnam, Vientiane, the capital city of Laos was chosen as the host of the 2009 Southeast Asian Games.

== Development and preparation ==
The Laos 25th SEA Games Organising Committee (LAOSOC) led by president Somsavath Lengsavath was formed to oversee the staging of the games.

=== Branding ===
Champa and Champi, the official mascots of the games.

The logo of the 2009 Southeast Asian Games is the image of the Pha That Luang, the national landmark and shrine of Laos beside the Mekong River. The shrine represents Laos as the host of the 2009 Southeast Asian Games and the Lao Culture, Arts and History, whereas the Mekong River, resembled by three wavy lines below the shrine, represents the origin of life, culture and lifestyle of Lao community especially in sports. The river itself also represents the integration of the Southeast Asian countries and the friendship made through sport events.

The mascots of the 2009 Southeast Asian Games are two white elephants dressed in traditional Lao attire named Champa and Champi. Champa is the male elephant and Champi is the female elephant. The elephants symbolize the host nation, Laos, as it was known as the kingdom of Lan Xang in ancient times, which literally means "the kingdom of a million elephants". The cheerful expression on the faces of the mascots are meant to represent the joyful and lively atmosphere during the games and warm welcome from Laos as the host country of the 25th SEA Games.

33 songs were written for the games, which included The Spirit of the Flame, the theme song of the games which was written and performed by Sam Intharaphithak. Other songs included "Go Laos" which was sung by Sam Intharaphithak, Nalin Daravong, and Kave, "SEA Games Harmony" which was sung by Sithiphone, Sam Intharaphithak, Gai, Malya and Poui and "Vientiane Games" which was sung by Buratino. A Beerlao Campaign song for the games was also composed.

=== Countdown ===
The countdown to the 25th SEA Games was held at the Chao Anouvong stadium on 31 December 2008, featured programmes such as the New Year celebrations, a show from Miss SEA Games contestants, performances by various artists, and a fireworks display. A countdown clock was also placed at a nearby shopping mall and the Patuxay Monument in Vientiane.

== Venues ==
The 2009 Southeast Asian Games used mostly new and some existing venues with the centrepiece of the activities being the new National Sport Complex. Incorporating the new 25,000-seat national stadium, it hosted most of the events. Athletes were housed at the National University of Laos, which was chosen as the games village.

The 25th Southeast Asian Games had 27 venues for the games, all in Vientiane.

Competition Venue	Sports
New National Sport Complex
New Laos National Stadium	Opening and closing ceremony, Athletics, Football (Men)
Aquatics stadium	Aquatics (Swimming, Diving, Water polo), Finswimming
Archery range	Archery
Gymnasium 1	Badminton
Beach Volleyball Stadium	Volleyball (Beach)
Gymnasium 2	Volleyball (Indoor)
Shooting range	Shooting
Tennis court	Tennis
National University of Laos
University Stadium	Football (Women)
Olympasia Gymnasium	Boxing
Convention hall	Table tennis
Booyong Gymnasium	Taekwondo, Wrestling
Petanque court	Petanque
Lao international Trade Exhibition and Convention Center
Hall 1	Sepak takraw
Hall 2	Wushu
Hall 3	Pencak silat
Beung Kha Nong Sports Centre
Lao-Thai Gymnasium	Muay
Gymnasium 1	Shuttlecock
Others
That Luang, Lan Xang Avenue, Samsenethai, Thadeua km10, T4, Kaysone Road	Cycling (Individual time trial)
Done Noune Tri Square, Ban Keun, return (Men: Thalath Market, Women: Pakkhanhoung)	Cycling (Mass start)
Dane Song	Cycling (Mountain bike: Downhill)
Tad Sone	Cycling (Mountain bike: Cross country)
Don Chan Palace Hotel	Billiards and snooker
Chao Anouvong Stadium	Football (Men and Women)
Chao Anouvong Gymnasium	Judo, Karate
SEA Games Golf Course	Golf
Pornsawan School	Weightlifting

=== Public transport ===
Lao Association of Travel Agents provided bus services during the Games to fetch volunteers between the city and outlying venues and transport athletes and performers to and from the games village, airport, the city, the games venues and within Laos. Car services were also available in the city throughout the games period.

== The games ==
=== Opening ceremony ===
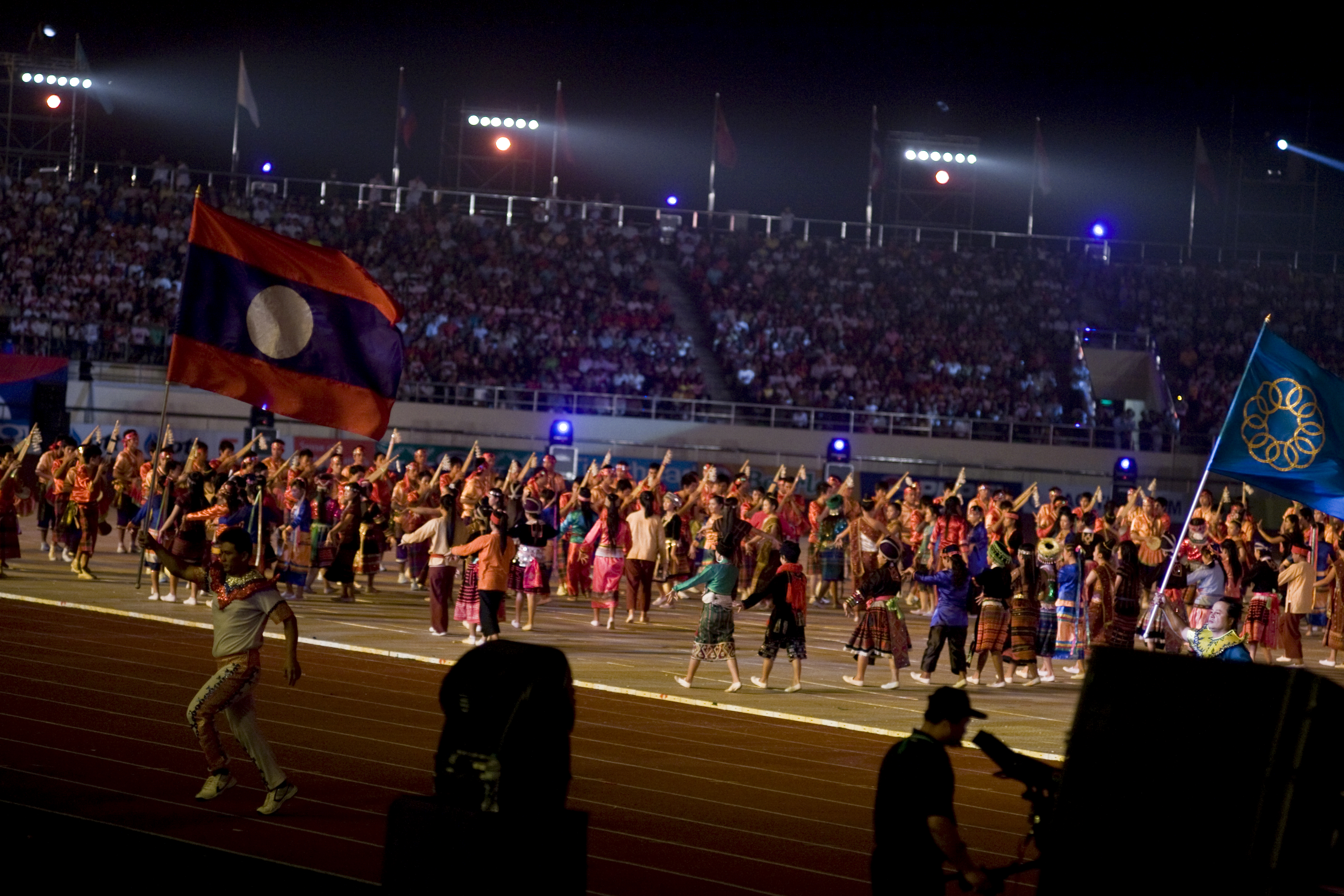
Opening ceremony

The opening ceremony of the 2009 Southeast Asian Games was held on 9 December 2009 at 18:10 (LST) at the New Laos National Stadium. The ceremony preceded with the arrival of the then President Choummaly Sayasone and several guests of honour to the stadium. This was followed by announcement of the ceremony commencement by announcers, the scoreboard countdown and the parade of athletes from the participating nations led by Lao Police Force band and flag bearers carrying the flags of the games and the flags of the participating nations began with the Bruneian delegation. The Lao delegation, the largest of all participating nations with 733 athletes and officials, received the warmest welcome from the audiences when they marched into the stadium. After all the contingent marched into the stadium, the National Flag of Laos and the games' flags were raised as the National Anthem of Laos is played. After that, Somsavat Lengsavad, the Standing Deputy Prime Minister of Laos and the chairman of the 25th Southeast Asian Games Organizing Committee gave the welcome speech and president Choummaly then declared the games opened. Mayuly Phanouvong took the athlete's oath, while the judge's oath was taken by Somphone Manikham. Later, a group of athletes passes the flame during the torch relay one after another before Phoxay Aphailath, lit the flame on an arrow carried by a man dressed as Sang Sinxay. The man who dressed as Sang Sinxay then aim the arrow lit by the flame from Phoxay with his bow carried with him at the cauldron, shoot and lit it instantly, symbolised the beginning of the games. After the cauldron was lit, the athletes took part at the parade earlier were escorted out of the stadium by the Lao Police Force, making way for the dance performance which concluded the ceremony. The dance performance includes segments such as Welcome dance for SEA Games, Forest, streams and life, Sinxay of Modern Times, Bright Future, In Harmony towards the future, Golden rice field and the light of righteousness.

=== Closing ceremony ===
The closing ceremony of the 2009 Southeast Asian Games was held on 18 December 2009 at 18:10 (LST) at the New Laos National Stadium. The ceremony preceded with the arrival of the then Prime Minister Bouasone Bouphavanh and several guests of honour to the stadium. It began with the parade of athletes by order of sports competed, followed by the closing speech of the games chairman, Songsavad Lengsavad, the lowering of the flag of Laos and the Games flag and the extinguishing of the cauldron. The hosting rights of the SEA Games was then handed over to Indonesia, host of the 2011 Southeast Asian Games in which Andi Mallarangeng, the Minister of Youth and Sports of Indonesia receiving the flag as the symbol of the handover. The Indonesian segment dance performance, Glory of Sriwijaya, was performed by dancers which combined dances from South Sumatra with other dances from Java. The ceremony concluded with the Lao farewell segment dance performances which included Paddy Trash, Lao New Year, Rocket Festival and boat racing festival.

=== Participating nations ===
- Brunei (74 athletes)
- Cambodia (214)
- Indonesia (650)
- Laos (853) (Host)
- Malaysia (564)
- Myanmar (389)
- Philippines (360)
- Singapore (413)
- Thailand (860)
- Timor-Leste (61)
- Vietnam (681)

=== Sports ===
Because of the limited sports facilities in Vientiane and Laos' lack of a coastline, only 25 sports featured in the programme, compared to 43 held in the 2007 Southeast Asian Games in Thailand. Among the Olympic sports removed from the Games were baseball, canoeing, sailing, gymnastics, hockey, rowing, fencing, triathlon, equestrian, softball, and basketball.

- Archery (8)
- Aquatics
  - Swimming (32)
  - Finswimming (16) ʰ
  - Diving (8)
  - Water polo (1)
- Athletics (45)
- Badminton (7)
- Billiards and snooker (10) ¹
- Boxing (15)
- Cycling (8)
- Football (2)
- Golf (4)
- Judo (18)
- Karate (17) ¹
- Muay (13)
- Pencak silat (17)
- Pétanque (11)
- Sepak takraw (8) ¹
- Shooting (34)
- Shuttlecock (7) ʰ
- Table tennis (7)
- Taekwondo (21)
- Tennis (7)
- Volleyball (4)
- Weightlifting (13)
- Wrestling (18)
- Wushu (21) ¹

Key
¹ – non-Olympic sports
ʰ – sports absent from previous edition and reintroduced by the host country

=== Calendar ===
OC	Opening ceremony	●	Event competitions	1	Gold medal events	CC	Closing ceremony

December	2 Wed	3 Thu	4 Fri	5 Sat	6 Sun	7 Mon	8 Tue	9 Wed	10 Thu	11 Fri	12 Sat	13 Sun	14 Mon	15 Tue	16 Wed	17 Thu	18 Fri	Events
Ceremonies								OC									CC	—N/a
Archery												●	●	4	4			8
Athletics												9	10	6	8	12		45
Badminton										●	●	2	●	●	●	5		7
Billiards and snooker									1	1	2	●	2	1	1	2		10
Boxing										●	●	●	●	●	5	10		15
Cycling								●	2	2		2	2					8
Diving										2	2	2	2					8
Finswimming														5	6	5		16
Football	●		●	●	●	●	●		●	●		●	●		1	1		2
Golf										●	●		4					4
Judo														4	7	7		18
Karate									4	7	6							17
Muay									●	●	●	●	6	7				13
Pencak silat												●	4	●	6	7		17
Pétanque									●	2	2		3	●	2		2	11
Sepak takraw							●	2	●	●	2	●	●	2	●	●	2	8
Shooting									6	6	4	4	4	4	2	2	2	34
Shuttlecock											●	2	●	3	2			7
Swimming									7	6	7	6	6					32
Table tennis							●	●	2	●	●	1	2	2				7
Taekwondo								5	6	6	4							21
Tennis									●	●	2	●	●	●	●	2	3	7
Volleyball									●	●	●	●	●	●	1	3		4
Water polo				●	●	1												1
Weightlifting									3	3	3	4						13
Wrestling														7	4	7		18
Wushu												4		2	4	11		21
Daily medal events	0	0	0	0	0	1	0	7	31	35	34	38	43	47	53	74	9	372
Cumulative total	0	0	0	0	0	1	1	8	39	74	108	146	189	236	289	363	372	372
December	2 Wed	3 Thu	4 Fri	5 Sat	6 Sun	7 Mon	8 Tue	9 Wed	10 Thu	11 Fri	12 Sat	13 Sun	14 Mon	15 Tue	16 Wed	17 Thu	18 Fri	Total events

=== Medal table ===
A total of 1246 medals, comprising 372 gold medals, 374 silver medals, and 500 bronze medals were awarded to athletes. The Host Laos performance was its best ever yet in Southeast Asian Games history and was placed seventh overall amongst participating nations.

* Host nation (Laos)

Rank	Nation	Gold	Silver	Bronze	Total
1	Thailand	86	83	97	266
2	Vietnam	83	75	57	215
3	Indonesia	43	53	74	170
4	Malaysia	40	40	59	139
5	Philippines	38	35	51	124
6	Singapore	33	30	35	98
7	Laos*	33	25	52	110
8	Myanmar	12	22	37	71
9	Cambodia	3	10	27	40
10	Brunei	1	1	8	10
11	Timor-Leste	0	0	3	3
Totals (11 entries)		372	374	500	1,246

== Broadcasting ==
The games were broadcast live on 14 radio and television channels and websites in six countries.

Brunei

- Radio Television Brunei

Laos

- Lao National Television, Lao Star Television, Lao National Radio

Myanmar

- MRTV-4

Singapore

- Mediacorp Channel 5

Thailand

- National Broadcasting Services of Thailand, Channel 7 (Thailand), Royal Thai Army Radio and Television Channel 5, TOT Public Company Limited, CAT Telecom, Thai Public Broadcasting Service

Vietnam

- Vietnam Multimedia Corporation, Vietnam Television

Malaysia's TV3 and TV2 only broadcast the Games' Men's Football events.

== Concerns, controversies and legacy ==
Prior to the games, the Laotian organising committee was criticised for reducing the number of sports. This had been done partly because Laos has no coastline (rendering sailing, windsurfing, and triathlon infeasible), and a general lack of sporting facilities in Vientiane. The inclusion of a number of Olympic sports, previously uncontested at the SEA Games, were interpreted as a bid for greater coverage of the Games in Laos. Few critics stated that Laos specifically selected games in which they had a better chance of winning gold medals. The decision to remove basketball from the programme was an unpopular one.

Many countries, including the Philippines – the defending champions for the men's division – offered to help to host the Games but Laos rejected these offers. Laos accepted funding from China, Japan, Vietnam and the ASEAN nations to construct the appropriate sports facilities including the US$100 million New Laos National Stadium and US$19 million Games village. Although prior criticisms had been levelled over the reduced programme and financing of facilities, upon commencement, the Games received a largely positive reaction from the other competing nations. The Games were considered a success for Laos, one of the poorest countries in the world, and a nation which had only sent four athletes to the 2008 Olympic Games.

Preceded by Nakhon Ratchasima	SEA Games; Vientiane; XXV Southeast Asian Games (2009)	Succeeded by Jakarta–Palembang
