= Singapore at the 2009 SEA Games =

Singapore at the 2009 Southeast Asian Games
- IOC code: SIN
- NOC: Singapore National Olympic Council
- Website: www.singaporeolympics.com (in English)

in Vientiane
- Competitors: 195 in 18 sports
- Flag bearer: Ong Jun Hong
- Officials: 99
- Medals Ranked 6th: Gold 33 Silver 30 Bronze 35 Total 98

Southeast Asian Games appearances (overview)
- 1959; 1961; 1965; 1967; 1969; 1971; 1973; 1975; 1977; 1979; 1981; 1983; 1985; 1987; 1989; 1991; 1993; 1995; 1997; 1999; 2001; 2003; 2005; 2007; 2009; 2011; 2013; 2015; 2017; 2019; 2021; 2023; 2025; 2027; 2029

Singapore participated in the 2009 Southeast Asian Games which held in the city of Vientiane, Laos from 9 December 2009 to 18 December 2009.

The games' first gold medal was also won by the Singapore water polo team.

== Expectations ==
Singapore entered the games with no official medal targets, but local media the Straits Times predicted 30 gold medals. The target is set lower than that for the previous games, as sports where Singapore traditionally does well, such as sailing, gymnastics and bowling were not featured in the games.

More specific targets were set by some sports, including swimming (11 golds), shooting (4 golds), football (1 gold), table tennis (7 golds) and water polo (1 gold). While no medals are expected, boxing, a sport Singapore is deputing in, aims to reach the semi-finals.
