= Thailand at the 2009 SEA Games =

Thailand at the 2009 Southeast Asian Games
- IOC code: THA
- NOC: National Olympic Committee of Thailand
- Website: www.olympicthai.or.th/eng (in English and Thai)

in Vientiane
- Flag bearer: Kawin Thamsatchanan (football)
- Medals Ranked 1st: Gold 86 Silver 83 Bronze 97 Total 266

Southeast Asian Games appearances (overview)
- 1961; 1965; 1967; 1969; 1971; 1973; 1975; 1977; 1979; 1981; 1983; 1985; 1987; 1989; 1991; 1993; 1995; 1997; 1999; 2001; 2003; 2005; 2007; 2009; 2011; 2013; 2015; 2017; 2019; 2021; 2023; 2025; 2027; 2029

Thailand participated in the 2009 Southeast Asian Games in the city of Vientiane, Laos from 9 December 2009 to 18 December 2009.

== Expectations ==
General Yuthasak Sasiprapha, the president of the National Olympic Committee of Thailand, told local media that Thailand expected to win about 100 gold medals.

Two years ago, then-hosts Thailand dominated the medals standings with 183 gold out of a total of 477 - well ahead of second-placed Malaysia on 68 and Vietnam on 64.

== Medals ==
Rank	Sport	Gold	Silver	Bronze	Total
1	Athletics	14	20	14	48
2	Shooting	10	8	12	30
3	Boxing	7	0	3	10
4	Taekwondo	6	3	4	13
5	Muay	6	2	1	9
6	Petanque	5	1	5	11
7	Sepak Takraw	5	1	0	6
8	Judo	4	6	4	14
9	Weightlifting	4	4	0	8
10	Tennis	4	2	3	9
11	Cycling	3	5	2	10
12	Wrestling	3	2	4	9
13	Swimming	2	9	8	19
14	Pencak Silat	2	4	4	10
15	Fin Swimming	2	3	3	8
16	Golf	2	2	0	4
17	Billiard & Snooker	2	0	3	5
18	Badminton	1	2	4	7
19	Beach Volleyball	1	1	0	2
19	Volleyball	1	1	0	2
21	Wushu	1	0	6	7
22	Archery	1	0	2	3
23	Shuttle Cock	0	4	1	5
24	Table Tennis	0	2	4	6
25	Football	0	1	0	1
26	KarateDo	0	0	7	7
27	Diving	0	0	3	3
Totals (27 entries)		86	83	97	266
