= Sport in Turkey =

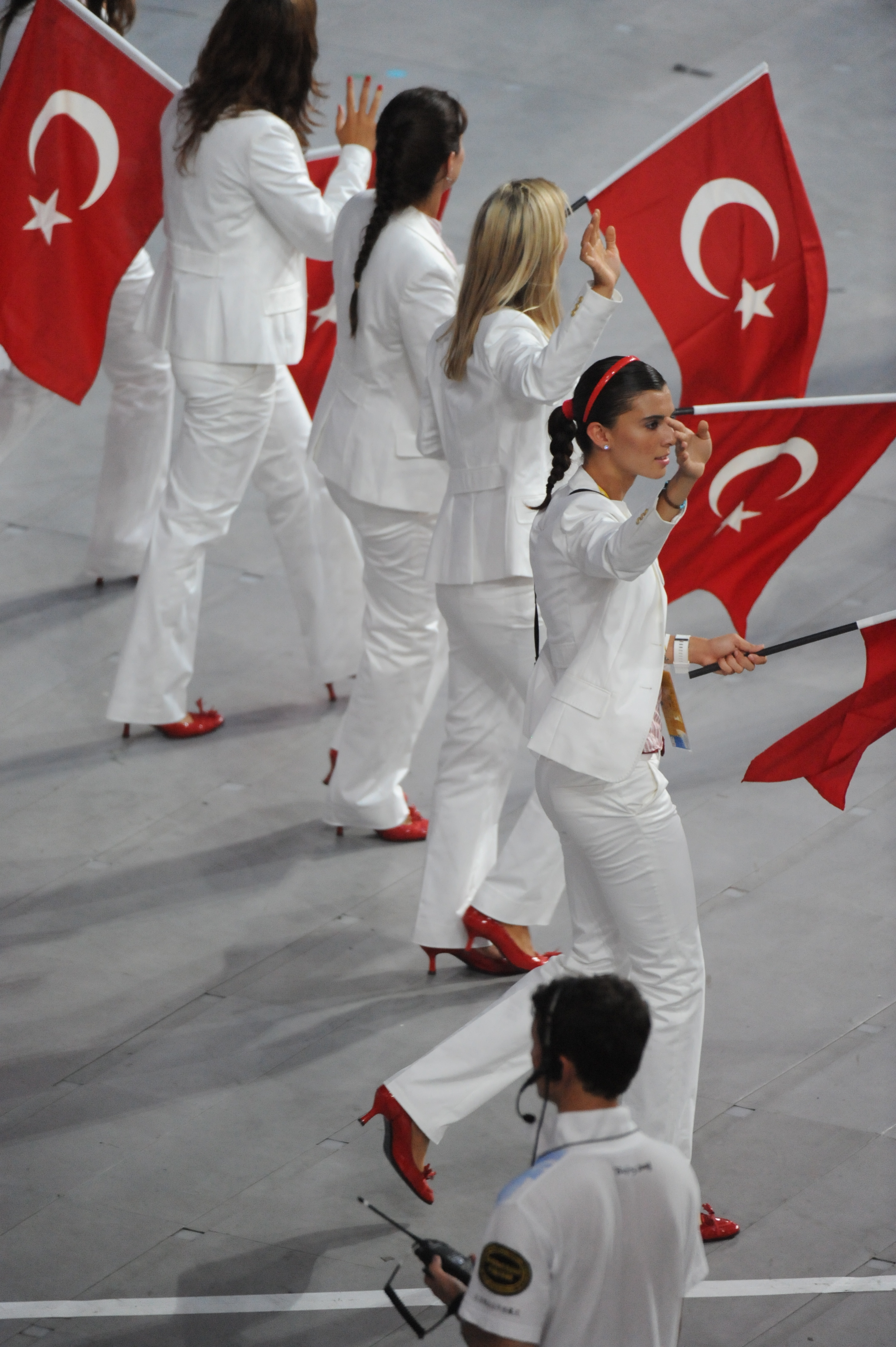
- Team Turkey at 2008 Summer Olympics

Sport in Turkey is governed by the Ministry of Youth and Sports, which oversees various sports federations and infrastructure. Turkey's participation in international sport competitions has started in the 1924 Olympic Games, continued with notable successes in wrestling, weightlifting, and boxing. Domestically, multi-sport clubs like Fenerbahçe S.K., the club which provides the most national athletes, have contributed to the development of various sports disciplines, achieving significant success. The focus on women's sports has also intensified, especially with municipality clubs of the big cities.

== Overview ==
Among all sports, the most popular one is football. Turkey's top teams include Fenerbahçe, Galatasaray and Beşiktaş. In 2000, Galatasaray won the UEFA Cup and UEFA Super Cup. Two years later, the Turkish national team finished third in the 2002 FIFA World Cup Finals in Japan and South Korea, while in 2008, the national team reached the semi-finals of the UEFA Euro 2008 competition. The Atatürk Olympic Stadium in Istanbul hosted the 2005 and 2023 UEFA Champions League Final, while the Şükrü Saracoğlu Stadium in Istanbul hosted the 2009 UEFA Cup Final. Turkey will host the UEFA Euro 2032 along with Italy.

Other popular mainstream sports include basketball and volleyball. Turkey hosted the Finals of EuroBasket 2001 and the 2010 FIBA World Cup the men's national team finishing second in both events. The national team also reached the quarter-finals of the 2006 FIBA World Cup, and 2014 FIBA World Cup. At the club level, Anadolu Efes (then known as Efes Pilsen) won the FIBA Korać Cup in 1996, finished second in the FIBA Saporta Cup in 1993, and made it to the Final Four of the EuroLeague in 2000 and 2001 as the first Turkish club in history. In the following years, Beşiktaş have come out as the winners of the FIBA EuroChallenge in the 2011–12 season with only a single defeat, all stages of the tournament included. Later on, Galatasaray won the EuroCup title in 2016. In the following 2016–17 Euroleague season, Fenerbahçe won Europe's highest-tier basketball league, the EuroLeague, as the first Turkish club ever, which was followed by Anadolu Efes in the 2020–21 Euroleague season. Turkey women's national basketball team won the silver medal in the European Championship in 2011 while Fenerbahçe Women's Basketball won their first Euroleague in 2023. Turkish basketball players such as Mehmet Okur, Hedo Türkoğlu and Ersan İlyasova have also been successful in the NBA. Active Turkish NBA players include Alperen Şengün and Adem Bona. Sevgi Uzun plays in WNBA, the first player ever being Nevriye Yılmaz.

Women's volleyball teams, namely Fenerbahçe, Eczacıbaşı and VakıfBank, have won numerous European championship titles and medals. VakıfBank is currently one of the best volleyball teams in the world, 3-time winner of the Club World Championship and 4 time European championship winner. The yellow-black team is also the most successful sports team of Turkey in International arena with the title of the most international trophy (9) holder of Turkey. Fenerbahçe also won the Club World Championship as the first Turkish club ever in 2010. The Turkish women's national volleyball team won a bronze medal in European Championship in 2011. In 2023, they've won every competition that they've partaken, including European and World tournaments, without losing a single match. That success placed them at first place in FIVB Senior World Rankings.

Turkish Federation of Traditional Sports regulates the traditional sports. The most prominent is oil wrestling ("Yağlı güreş"), originating in Ottoman times. Edirne hosts the annual Kırkpınar oiled wrestling tournament since 1361.

== Football ==
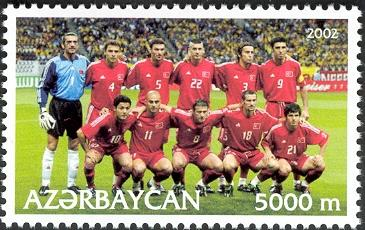
The Turkish national football team has notably secured in third place at the 2002 FIFA World Cup and the 2003 FIFA Confederations Cup, and reaching the semi-finals at UEFA Euro 2008. The team scored the fastest goal in a FIFA World Cup match.

Turkey has risen to prominence in a number of sporting areas in recent decades. Football has seen a rapid transformation earning it third place in the coveted 2002 FIFA World Cup. Its domestic teams are dominated by Beşiktaş, Fenerbahçe, and Galatasaray. Of these, Fenerbahçe's European triumph came in the now defunct Balkans Cup in 1968. Galatasaray has seen success after the 1990s, winning the 2000 UEFA Cup and UEFA Super Cup. In recent years, Turkey has exported many of its players into top foreign teams, including Internazionale, FC Barcelona, Parma, Milan, and Bayern Munich, among others. As well as sending players abroad, the Turkish league has also attracted players into Turkey. World class players such as Radomir Antić, Toni Schumacher, Gheorghe Hagi, Giga Popescu, Cláudio Taffarel, Mário Jardel, Óscar Córdoba, Frank de Boer, Pierre van Hooijdonk, John Carew, Alex, Franck Ribéry, Nicolas Anelka, Mateja Kežman, Roberto Carlos, Milan Baroš, Harry Kewell, Dani Güiza, Giovani dos Santos, Guti, Quaresma, Hugo Almeida, Dirk Kuyt, Didier Drogba, Wesley Sneijder, Robin van Persie, Mario Gómez and many more have played at some point or continue to play in Turkey.

== Basketball ==
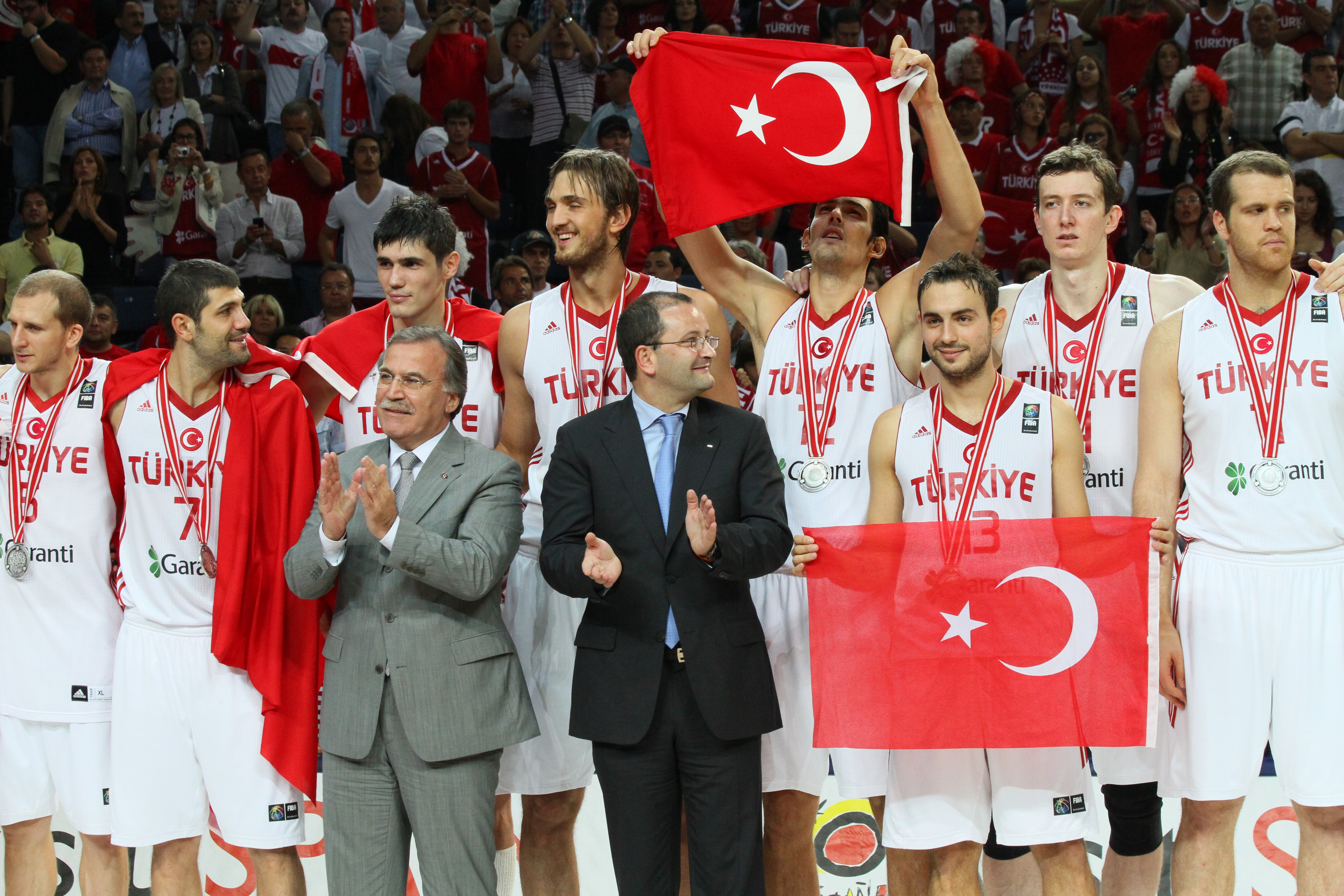
Turkey won the silver medal at the 2010 FIBA World Championship.

Basketball is a popular sport in Turkey. Turkey came in second at the European Basketball Championship 2001 in Istanbul. Turkey also came in ninth at the 2002 FIBA World Cup. Several Turkish nationals, including Ersan İlyasova, Hedo Türkoğlu, Mehmet Okur, Semih Erden, Ömer Aşık, and Enes Kanter, have played in the prestigious National Basketball Association, generally considered the world's top basketball league. Turkey's greatest success in international basketball came when it hosted the 2010 FIBA World Cup, finishing second behind the USA. Hedo Türkoğlu captained the national side and made the all-tournament team. Turkey also advanced to the quarter-finals in the 2006 FIBA World Cup, achieving a non-expected sixth place. Turkey reached the quarter-finals again eight years later at the 2014 FIBA World Cup. The Turkey women's national basketball team won the silver medal at the EuroBasket Women in 2011.

At a club level, the most successful team has been Fenerbahçe S.K. and Anadolu Efes S.K., the latter having won the FIBA Korać Cup in 1996 and the Euroleague in 2021 and 2022. Fenerbahçe currently has the most Euroleague Final Four appearances (seven) and was the first Turkish team to win the title in the 2016–17 season. Galatasaray won the EuroCup title, Europe's second-tier basketball league, in 2016. Past achievements also include Beşiktaş' FIBA EuroChallenge title in the 2012. In women's basketball, Galatasaray won the 2008-09 FIBA EuroCup, finished third in the same competition in 2007–08, and also was runner-up in the 2009 FIBA Europe SuperCup Women.

=== Attendances ===
The Turkish basketball club with the highest average home league attendance per league season:

#	Club	League	Average
2024-25	Fenerbahçe	EuroLeague	10,785
2023-24	Anadolu Efes	EuroLeague	12,165

== Volleyball ==
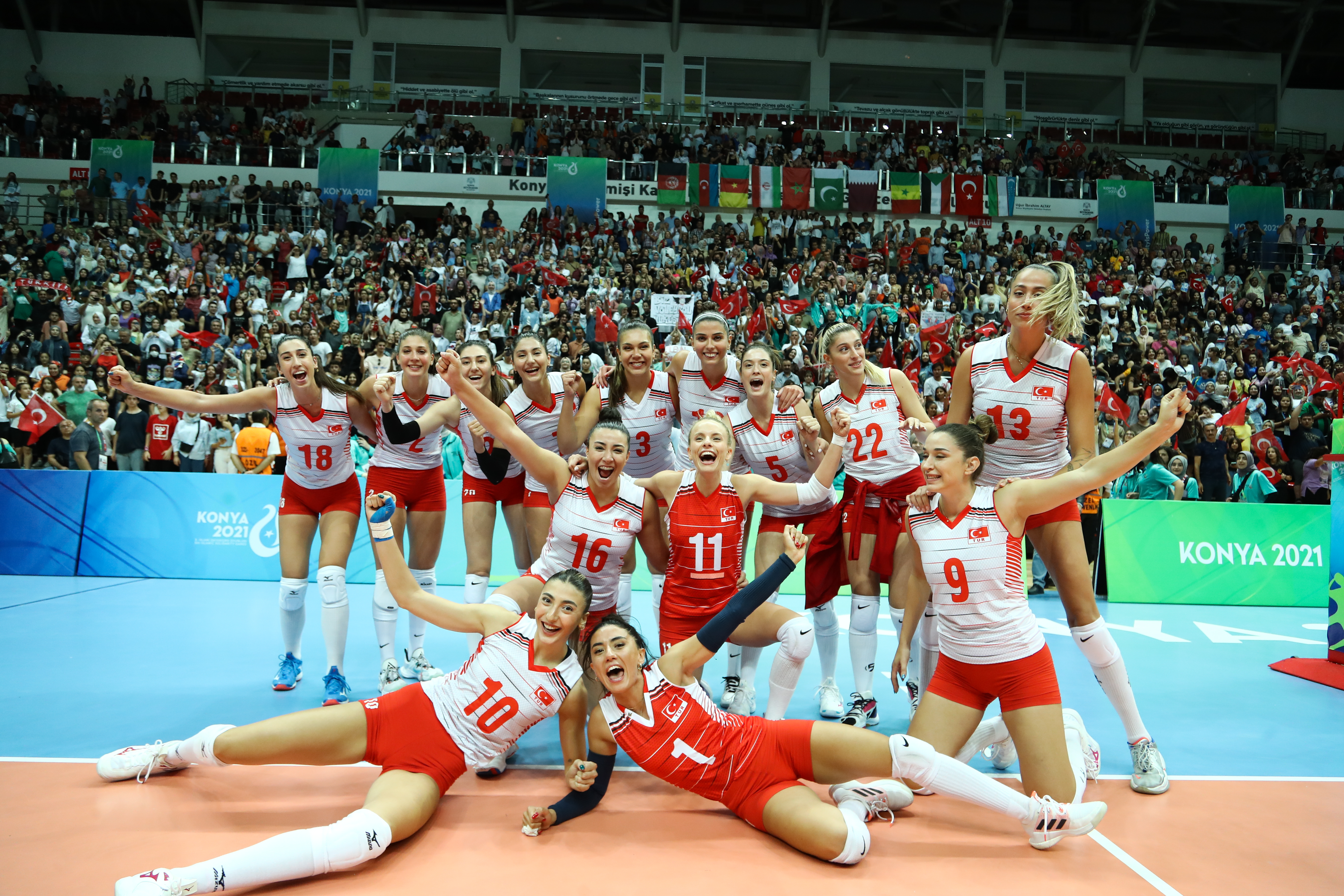
Turkey women's national volleyball team in 2021

Volleyball, especially women's volleyball, is a popular sport in Turkey. The Turkey women's national volleyball team secured 6th place at the FIVB Volleyball Women's World Championship in 2010 in Japan, and won a bronze medal at the Women's European Volleyball Championship in 2011 in Serbia. Turkey's top women's volleyball team is VakıfBank, which went undefeated to win three championships at the FIVB Volleyball Women's Club World Championship in 2013, 2017, and 2018. The same team won five championships (again going undefeated each time) in the CEV Women's Champions League in 2011, 2013, 2017, 2018, and 2022. They took gold medals at both the Challenge Cup and the Women's Top Volley International in the 2007–08 season. Another prominent Turkish women's volleyball club is Fenerbahçe, which won the FIVB Volleyball Women's Club World Championship with an undefeated record in 2010, took the silver medal in the CEV Women's Champions League in the 2009–10 season, and finished in third place during the 2010–11 season.

They've won 22 consecutive matches in 2023. In that period, they completed the Nations League, European Championship and Olympic Qualification Round / FIVB World Cup matches undefeated. Being the first team to do so in history and securing the 1st place in world rankings.

Turkey featured a men's national team in beach volleyball that competed at the 2018–2020 CEV Beach Volleyball Continental Cup.

== Air sports ==
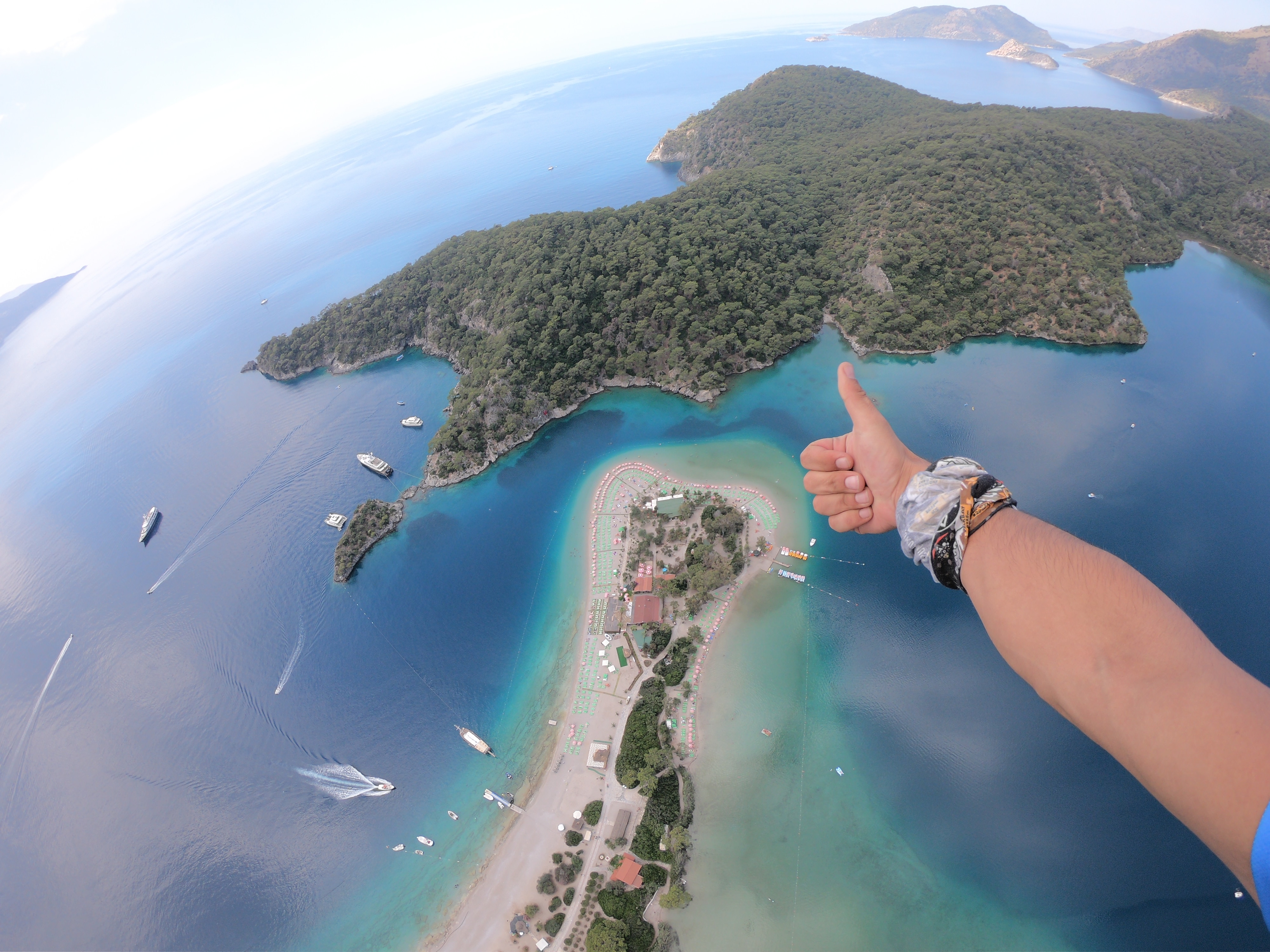
Paragliding in Fethiye

Plane gliding, hang gliding, parachuting, paragliding, engine powered flights and skydiving are regulated by Turkish Aeronautical Association and Directorate General of Civil Aviation.

== Archery ==
Archery is among the traditional sports. Mete Gazoz achieved #1 spot in world rankings in 2022.

== Athletics ==
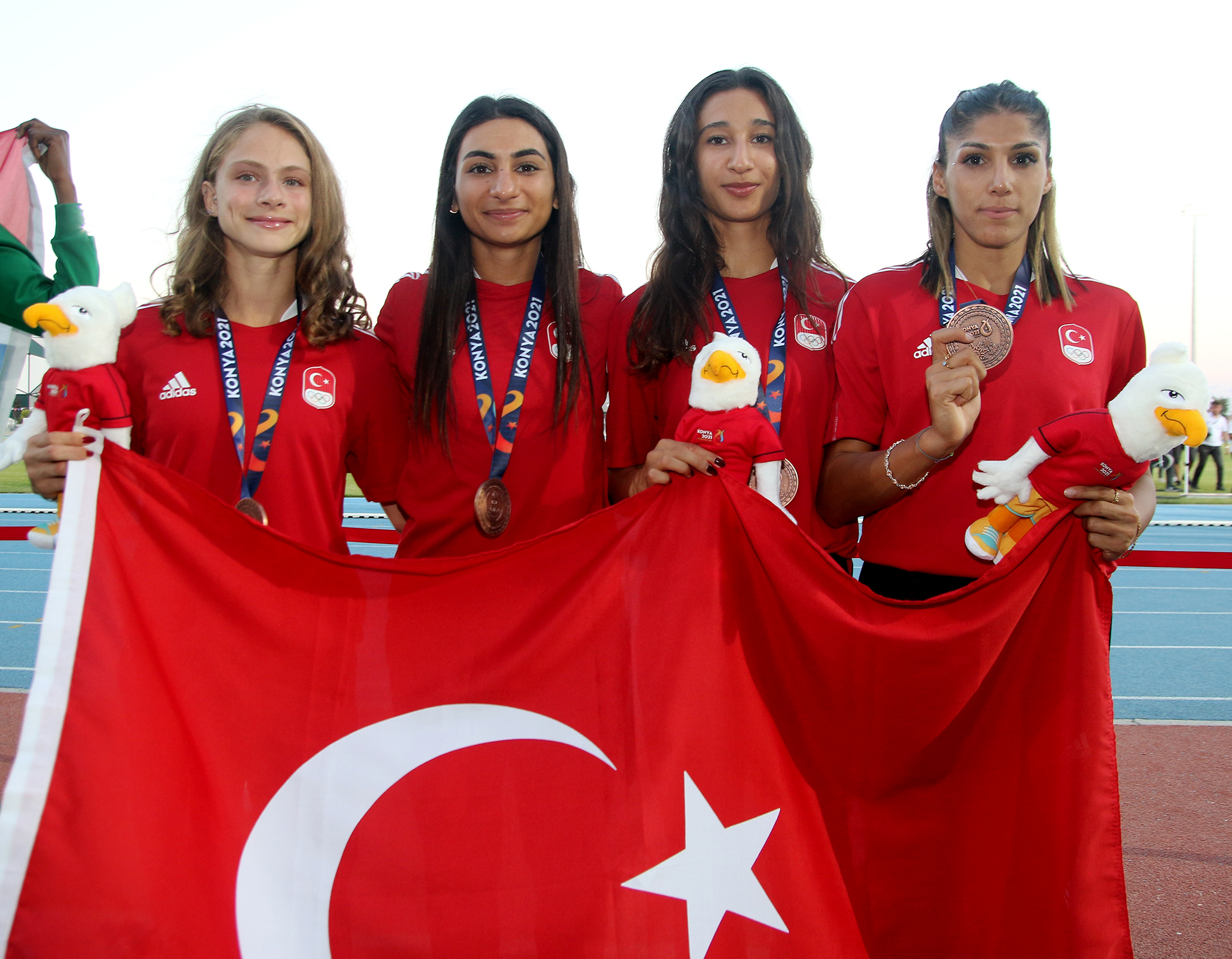
Team Turkey in Universiade.

Athletics is another fast improving sport. Süreyya Ayhan set the 1500m world record in 2003 and Elvan Abeylegesse set a new 5000m record in 2004. In 2010 European Athletics Championships Alemitu Bekele and Elvan Abeylegesse won gold and silver medals respectively in Women's 5000 metres and Elvan Abeylegesse medal in Women's 10000 metres. Nevin Yanıt won first European Championship in a sprint race for Turkey by winning gold in Women's 100 metres hurdles. In 2011 European Athletics Indoor Championships Kemal Koyuncu won silver in Men's 1500 metres and Halil Akkas won bronze in Men's 3000 metres. In 2017, Ramil Guliyev of Fenerbahçe won Turkey's first ever gold medal in the men's 200 metre race at the 2017 World Championships, being the second white athlete in history to achieve this feat. The country also hosts major marathons such as Istanbul Marathon.

== Billiards ==
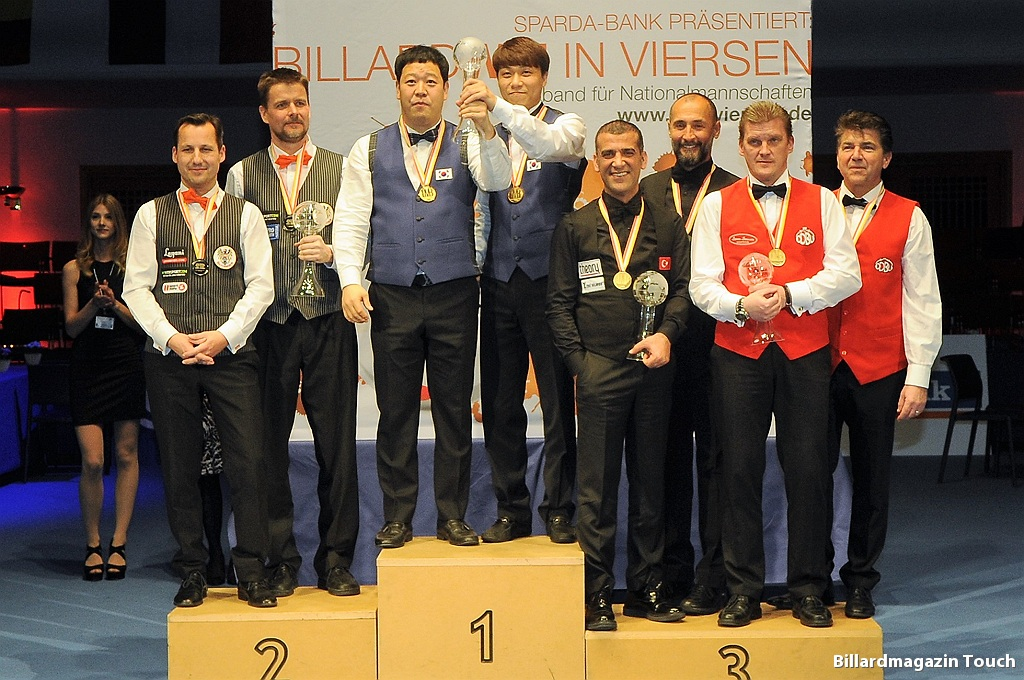
Tayfun Taşdemir and Semih Saygıner at 2018 World 3-Cushion Championship

Gülşen Degener, Güzin Müjde Karakaşlı, Semih Saygıner and Tayfun Taşdemir are prominent carom billiards players.

== Chess ==
Turkey is regularly competing in international tournaments like the Chess Olympiad. Notable figures include Grandmasters Suat Atalık and Kübra Öztürk, as well as Vahap Şanal, the first Turkish male to surpass a 2600 FIDE rating.

== Equestrian ==
The country participates in international competitions such as the International Federation for Equestrian Sports World Cup, with events held in cities like Istanbul and Bursa.

== Golf ==
Belek in Antalya is a key destination. The country hosts international tournaments such as the Turkish Airlines Open, which is part of the European Tour.

== Gymnastics ==
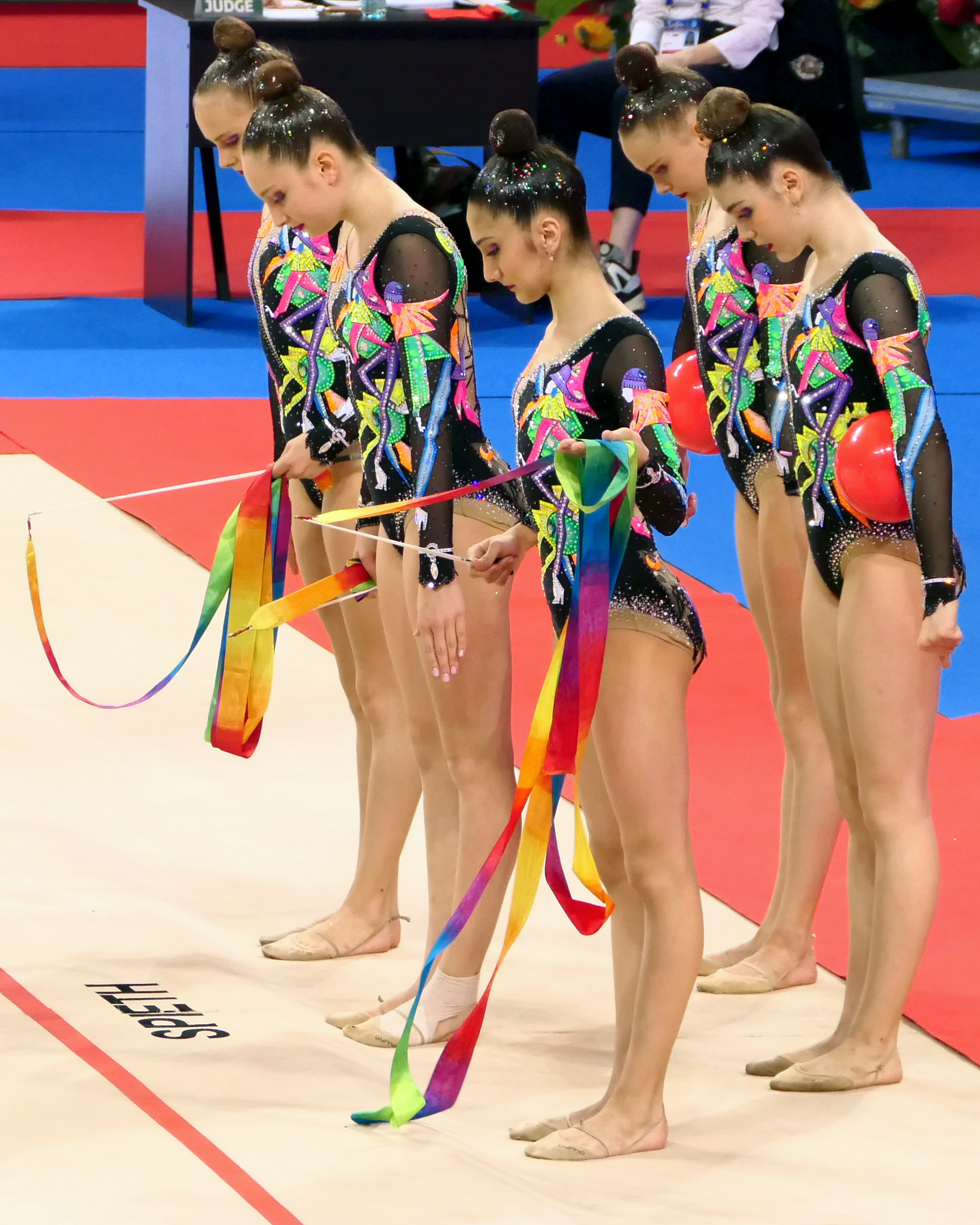
The group from Turkiye at the 2024 Sofia World Cup

The country has seen success in both artistic and rhythmic gymnastics, with athletes like Ferhat Arıcan and İbrahim Çolak bringing home medals from European and World Championships.

== Cycling ==
The country hosts the Presidential Cycling Tour of Turkey, a UCI ProSeries event. Turkish cyclists like Ahmet Örken and Batuhan Özgür have earned recognition.

== Gridiron & rugby ==
Turkish Gridiron Football First League is mostly inhabited by university teams.

Rugby League is a relatively new sport in Turkey, so far five clubs make up the rugby league in Turkey, observer status within the Rugby League European Federation is expected.

== Handball & beach handball ==
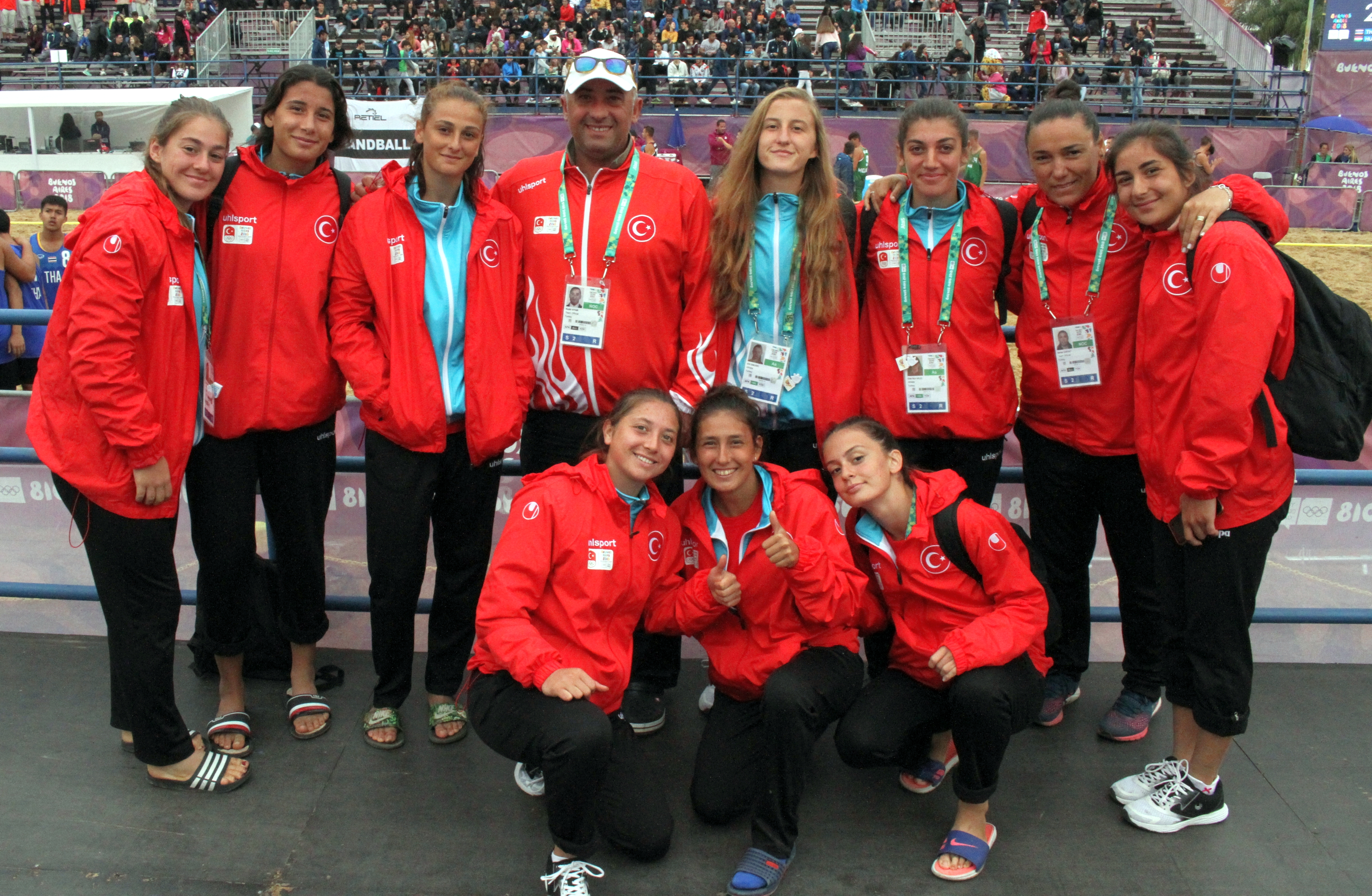
Beach handball at the 2018 Summer Youth Olympics

2010 Beach Handball World Championships were held between June 23–27 in Antalya. The Turkish national team won twice the silver medal at the World Championships in 2004 and 2006, and the bronze medal in 2010. The Turkish women's national team also won the silver medal at the 2004 World Championships. Yeliz Özel of Ankara is a Turkish handballer.

== Fencing ==
Turkey hosted the 2009 World Fencing Championships held from September 30 to October 8 in Antalya. Turkey competes in all three fencing disciplines: foil, épée, and sabre.

== Martial arts ==
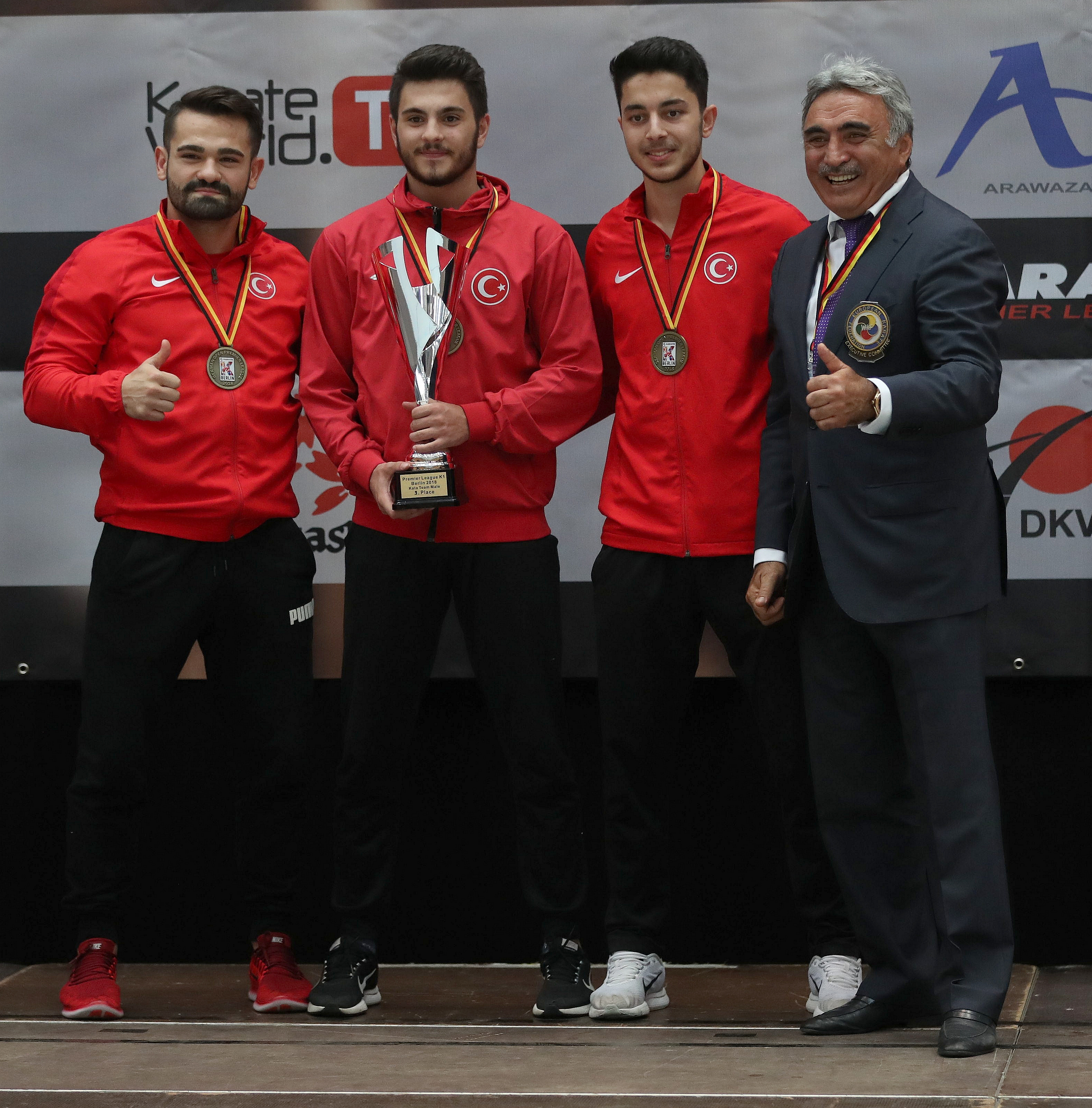
Team Turkey at Karate1 Premier League

Turkish athletes have earned international success, particularly in taekwondo, where they have won Olympic medals and World Championship titles. Karate fighters from Turkey achieve top results in European and World Championships, while kickboxers and Muay Thai fighters have also secured world titles. Buse Naz Çakıroğlu and Busenaz Sürmeneli have both secured medals in olympics. Avni Yıldırım achieved international success in boxing. Some MMA athletes include İbo Aslan and Gökhan Saki.

== Motorsports ==
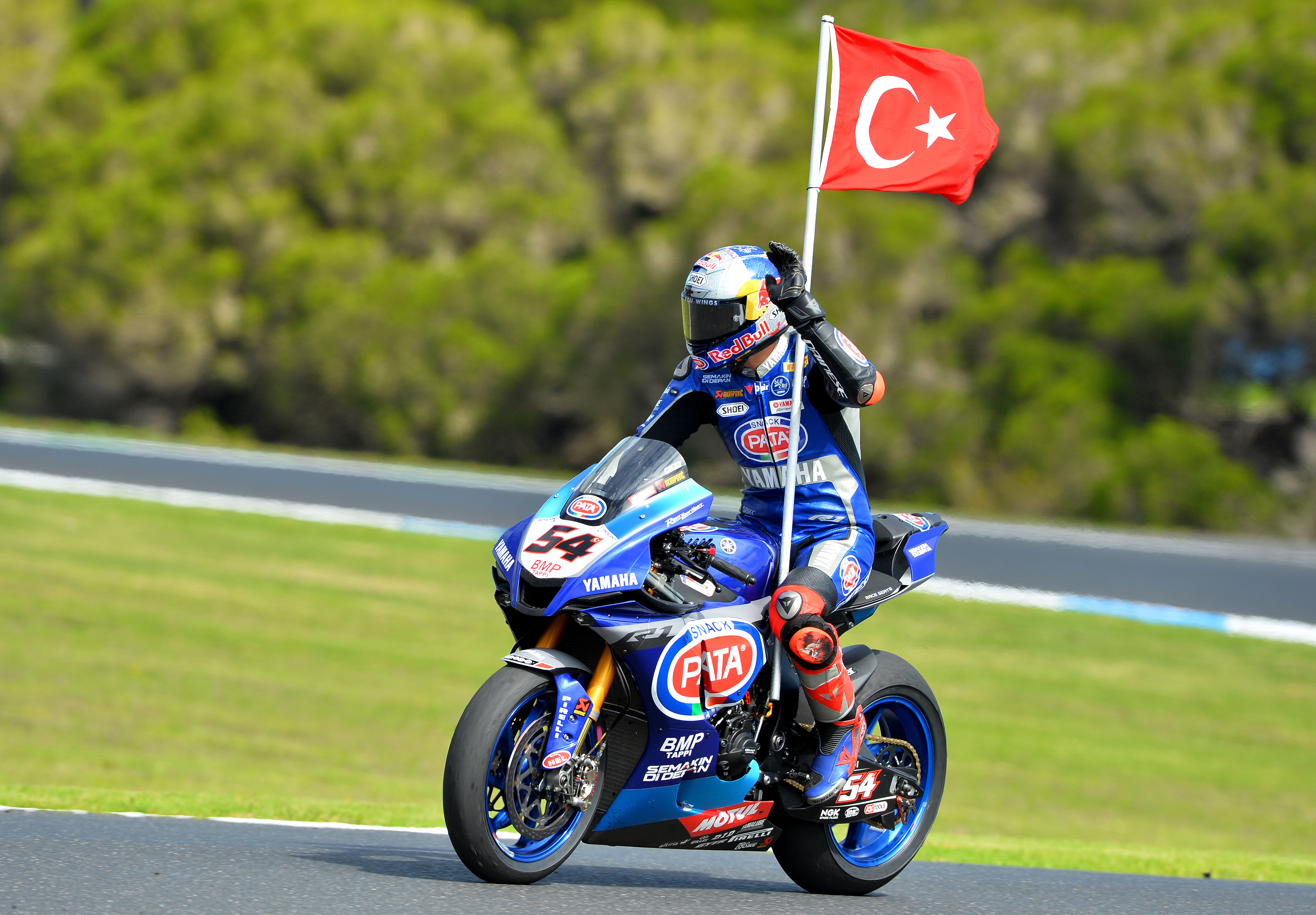
Toprak Razgatlıoğlu

Motorsports have become popular, especially following the inclusion of the Rally of Turkey to the FIA World Rally Championship calendar in 2003, and the inclusion of the Turkish Grand Prix to the Formula One racing calendar in 2005. Other important annual motorsports events which are held at the Istanbul Park racing circuit include the MotoGP Grand Prix of Turkey, the FIA World Touring Car Championship, the GP2 Series and the Le Mans Series. From time to time, Istanbul and Antalya also host the Turkish leg of the F1 Powerboat Racing championship; while the Turkish leg of the Red Bull Air Race World Championship, an air racing competition, takes place above the Golden Horn in Istanbul.

The track located at Istanbul has a seating capacity of 155,000 people (biggest in Europe), is just over 5,340 m long and runs anti-clockwise. The track was designed by Hermann Tilke, designer of the Sepang, Bahrain and Shanghai tracks. GP2 series also include a Turkish Team (Petrol Ofisi FMS International) and a Turkish Driver, Jason Tahincioglu.

Cem Bölükbaşı became the first Turkish driver in Formula 2 in 2023.

Kenan Sofuoğlu became world champion in Supersport three times in 2007, 2010, and 2012. Toprak Razgatlıoğlu got Superbike World Championship in 2023 and 2024.

Seda Kaçan, the country's second female car racing driver after Ann Tahincioğlu, is also her country's first international race driver. She secured the championship title in the DSG class of the 2024 TCR European Endurance, becoming the first woman to do so.

== Shooting ==
Turkey has had success in international competitions, including the ISSF World Cups and the Olympics. Notable shooters like Yusuf Dikeç and İsmail Keleş.

== Tennis & table tennis ==
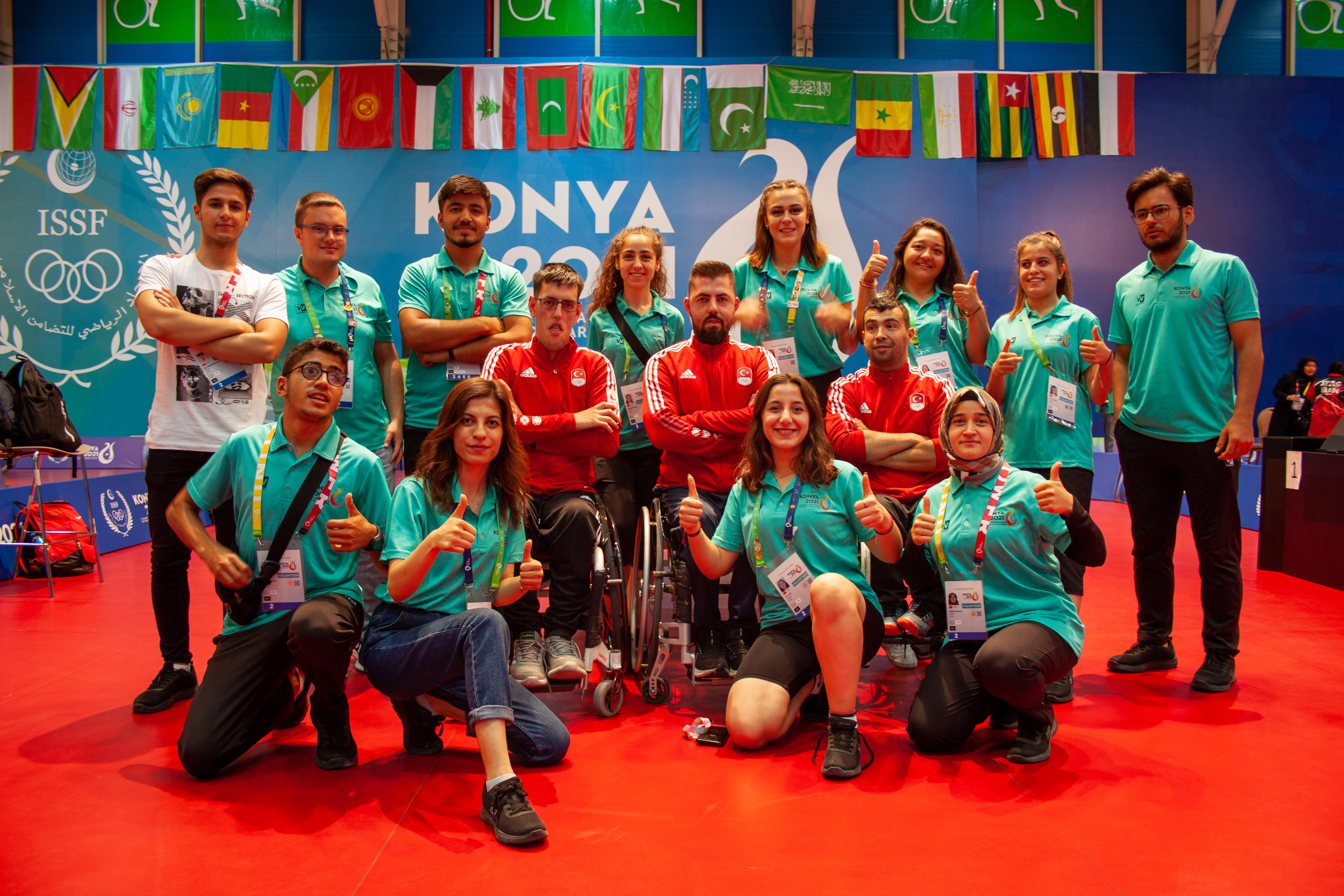
Para table tennis team at Islamic Solidarity Games in 2021

Facilities include the Turkish Tennis Federation Complex in Ankara and the Garanti Koza Arena in Istanbul. Turkey hosts professional events such as the Istanbul Open (ATP) and Istanbul Cup (WTA). There are WTA winners such as Çağla Büyükakçay, İpek Soylu and Zeynep Sönmez. Marsel İlhan is the first Turkish male player to reach the top 100 in ATP rankings.

Melek Hu is a prominent table tennis player.

== Triathlon ==
The country hosts international triathlon events. Turkish athletes like Gülşah Günenç have gained recognition for their performances at international competitions.

== Watersports ==
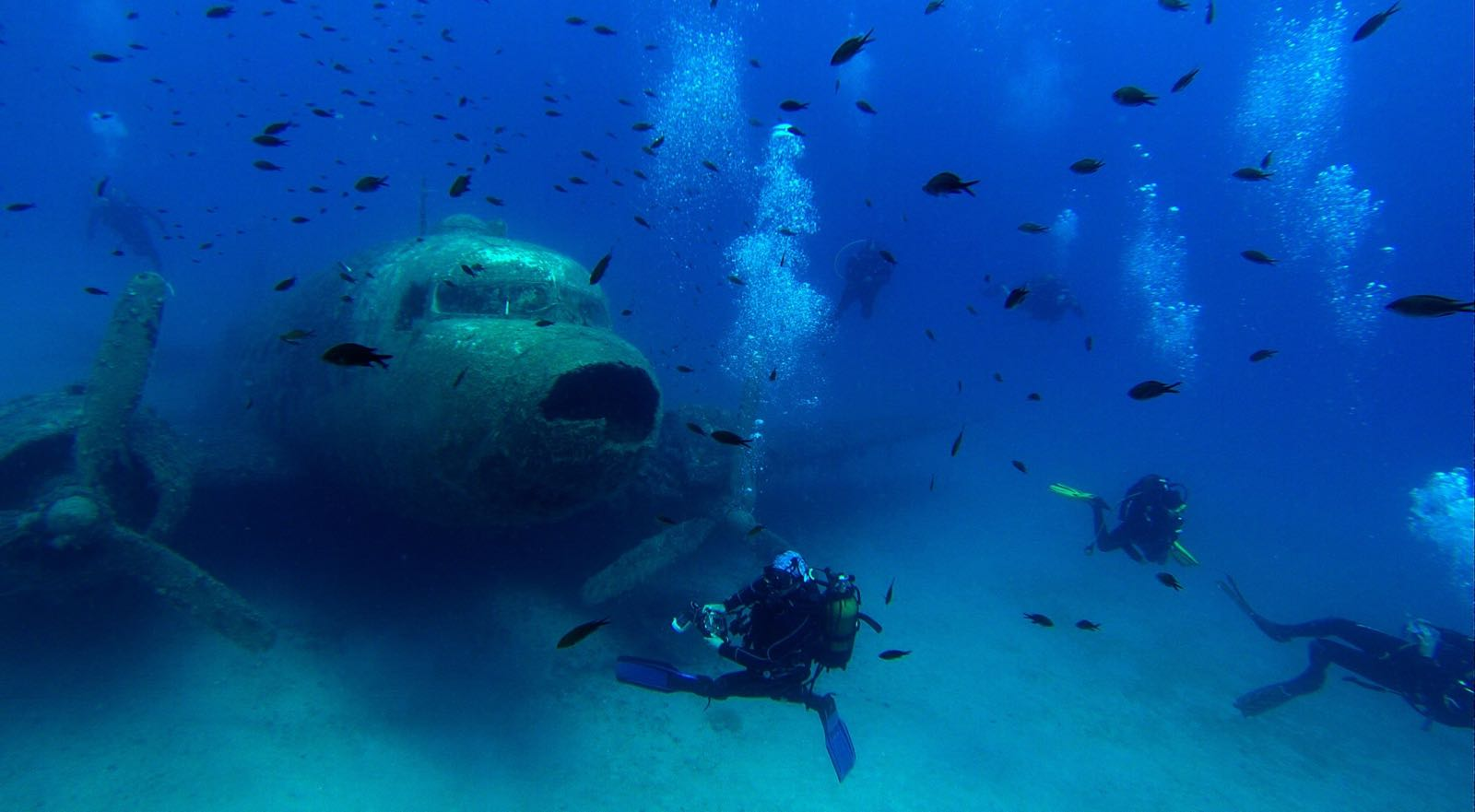
A submerged Douglas DC-3 in Kaş

Diving: Turkey accepts both CMAS and SSI regulations.

Fishing: cannot be done from any boat without a license, even if you're an amateur. You must apply to have one by submitting some I.D. cards and paying a fee 150 Turkish Lira for two years. Details concerning fishing zones, the minimum sizes of fish that can be caught, and the numbers of fish that can be caught per person can be obtained from the Department of Fisheries at the Ministry of Agriculture and Rural Affairs.

Rafting: Turkey's rivers provide conditions for canoeing and rafting.

Sailing: Turkey has four bordering seas; the Black Sea, Marmara Sea, Aegean Sea, and Mediterranean Sea, so cruising is a popular sport.

Windsurfing & kitesurfing: The bays around Çeşme, Alaçatı, Bodrum, and Datça peninsulas as well as Antalya have wind conditions for windsurfing. Famous windsurfer Çağla Kubat is also from Turkey.

== Weightlifting ==
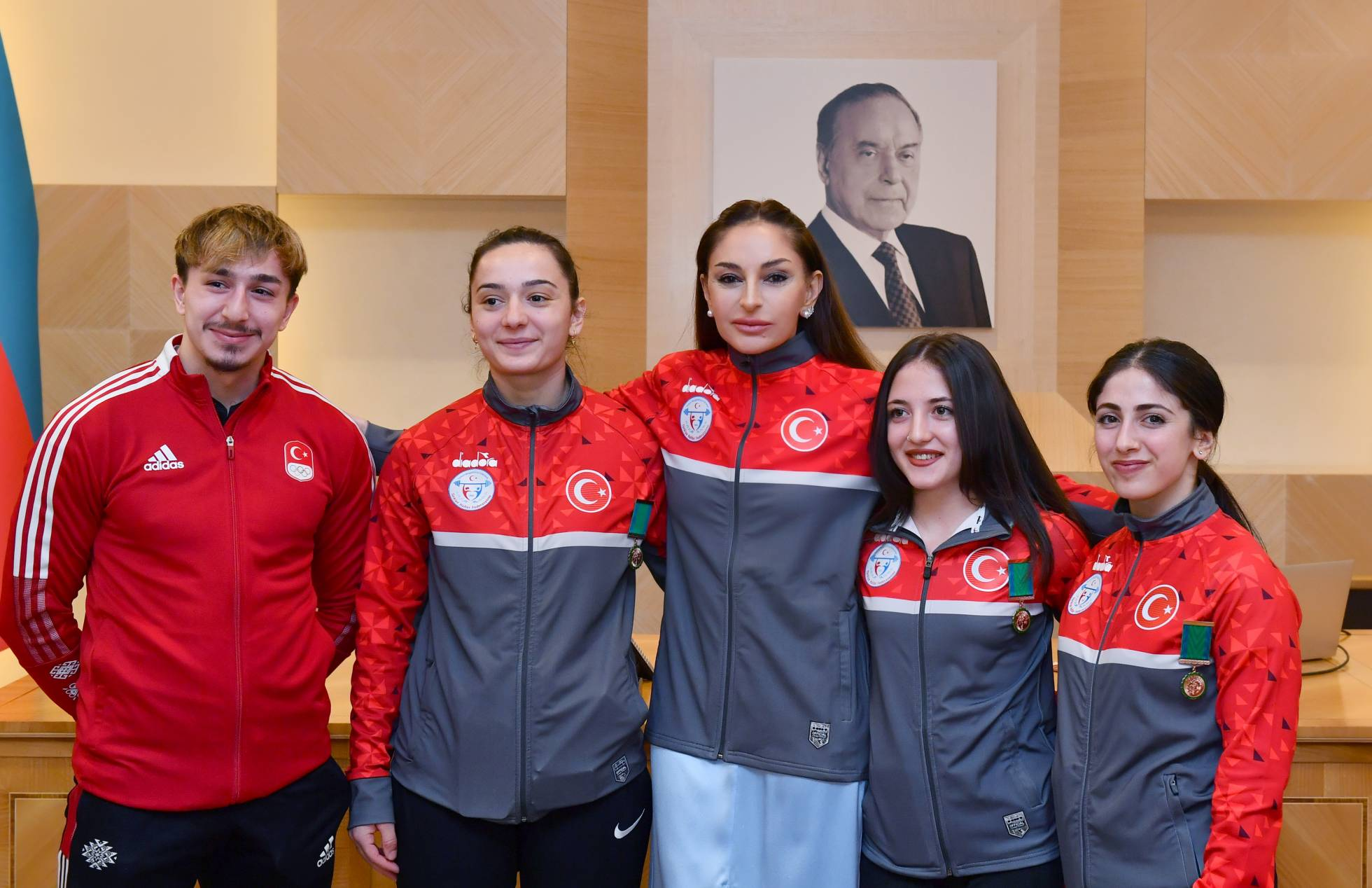
Turkish team in 2023 European Weightlifting Championship

Weightlifting has been another successful sport for Turkey, regularly relied upon to provide gold medals in the Olympics. Its most famous weightlifters, Naim Süleymanoğlu and Halil Mutlu, and among women Nurcan Taylan. Some major events include Bosphorus Cross Continental Swim.

== Winter sports ==
Some destinations for winter sports include; Davraz, Kartepe, Palandöken, Sarıkamış and Uludağ.

== Wrestling ==
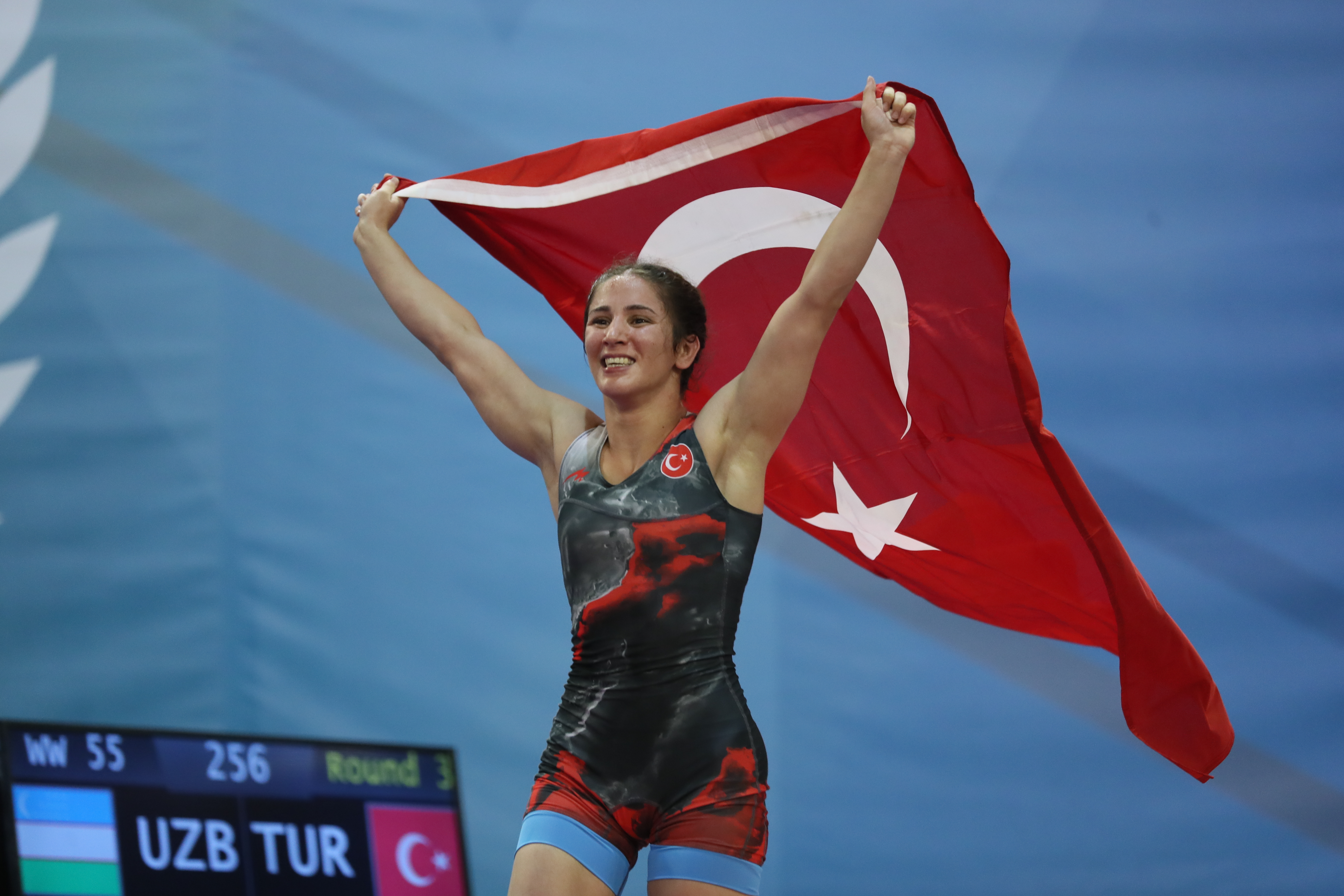
Zeynep Yetgil at 2021 Islamic Solidarity Games

Wrestling is considered as a national sport. Turkey has most of its gold medals in wrestling. Notable Olympic champions include Yaşar Doğu, Hamza Yerlikaya, and Taha Akgül.

== See also ==
- List of Turkish sportspeople
