= List of Turkish sportspeople =

This is a list of notable Turkish sportspeople.

Contents: A B C Ç D E F G H I İ J K L M N O Ö P R S Ş T U Ü V Y Z

== A ==
- Elvan Abeylegesse – Female middle and long distance track runner
- Mustafa Abi – former Basketball player
- Tutku Açık – Basketball player
- Olcan Adın – Footballer
- Nasuh Akar – Wrestler
- Taha Akgül - Wrestler
- Gülşah Akkaya – Female basketball player
- Derya Aktop – Female boxer
- Cenk Akyol – Basketball player
- Işıl Alben – female Basketball player
- Furkan Aldemir – Basketball player
- Halil Altıntop – Footballer
- Hamit Altıntop – Footballer
- Eşref Apak – Hammer thrower
- Lütfi Arıboğan – former Basketball player
- Cihat Arman – Footballer
- Ender Arslan – Basketball player
- Can Artam - Race car driver
- Sedat Artuç – Weightlifter
- Ömer Aşık – Basketball player (Houston Rockets)
- Can Akın – Basketball player
- Cenk Akyol – Basketball player
- Serdar Apaydın – former Basketball player, Coach
- Ergin Ataman – Coach
- Necati Ateş – Footballer
- Celal Atik – Wrestler
- Engin Atsür – Basketball player
- İsmet Atlı – Wrestler
- Abdullah Avcı – former Footballer, Coach
- Nazmi Avluca – Wrestler
- Samet Aybaba – former Footballer, Coach
- Efe Aydan – former Basketball player
- Naz Aydemir – Volleyball player
- Fırat Aydınus – Referee
- Soner Aydoğdu – Footballer
- Süreyya Ayhan – Track Athlete
- Yalçın Ayhan – Footballer
- Serkan Aykut – Footballer
- Mert Aytuğ - Motorcycle racer
- Kazım Ayvaz – Wrestler
- Serdar Aziz – Footballer

== B ==
- Mesut Bakkal – Coach
- Doğuş Balbay – Basketball player
- Serkan Balcı – Footballer
- Pini Balili – Footballer (striker)
- Hakan Balta – Footballer
- Can Bartu – Footballer
- Birkan Batuk – Basketball player
- Rasim Başak – former Basketball player
- Yıldıray Baştürk – Footballer
- Mithat Bayrak – Wrestler
- Engin Baytar – Footballer
- Malik Beyleroğlu – Boxer
- Erdal Bibo – former Basketball player
- Burak Değer Biçer - Brazilian Jiu-Jitsu practitioner
- Ahmet Bilek – Wrestler
- Gazanfer Bilge – Wrestler
- Aytaç Biter - Race car driver
- Emre Belözoğlu – Footballer
- Sinan Bolat – Footballer
- Bülent Korkmaz - Footballer
- Umut Bulut – Footballer
- Okan Buruk – former Footballer
- Evren Büker – Basketball player
- Çağla Büyükakçay - Female tennis player

== C ==
- Emre Can – Footballer
- Özhan Canaydın – former basketball player
- Cavit Cav (1905-1982) – Olympian road cyclist

== Ç ==
- Bahar Çağlar – female Basketball player
- Cüneyt Çakır – Referee
- Rıza Çalımbay – former Footballer, Coach
- Hakan Çalhanoğlu - Footballer
- Nurcan Çarkçı – female Boxer
- Fuat Çapa – Coach
- Serhat Çetin – Basketball player
- Servet Çetin – Footballer
- Burcu Çetinkaya - Female rally driver
- Ahmet Çakar – former Referee
- Emre Çolak – Footballer
- Tanju Çolak – Footballer

== D ==
- Mustafa Dağıstanlı – Wrestler
- Nedim Dal – former Basketball player
- Yasemin Begüm Dalgalar – female Basketball player
- Yasemin Dalkılıç – Free diver
- Ümit Davala – Footballer
- Gülşen Degener – Female billiards player
- Aykut Demir – Footballer
- Neslihan Demir – Volleyball player
- Mithat Demirel – Basketballer
- Volkan Demirel – Footballer
- Mustafa Denizli – Footballer and coach
- Hakan Dinç - Racing driver
- Kemal Dinçer – former Basketball player, Team manager
- Sinem Doğu – Female ice hockey player
- Yaşar Doğu – Wrestler
- Erwin Dudley – Basketball player

== E ==
- Şafak Edge – basketball player
- Mehmet Ekici – footballer
- Omer Elmas (born 1968 or 1969), wrestler
- Zaza Enden – basketball player
- Orhun Ene – basketball player, coach
- Korel Engin – basketball player
- Ahmet Enünlü – bodybuilder
- Arif Erdem – footballer
- Eda Erdem – volleyball player
- Semih Erden – basketball player
- Harun Erdenay – basketball player, Team manager
- Mevlüt Erdinç – footballer
- Isyan Erdoğan – footballer
- Serkan Erdoğan – basketball player
- Yaşar Erkan – wrestler
- Hasibe Erkoç – Female boxer
- Barış Ermiş – basketball player
- Tufan Ersöz – basketball player
- Erden Eruç – ocean rower, mountain climber, bicyclist

== F ==
- Malik Fathi – Footballer
- Kerim Frei – Footballer

== G ==
- Hasan Gemici – Wrestler
- Aytek Genç – former Socceroo and Football(soccer)Coach
- Gizem Girişmen - Paralympic archer
- Hüseyin Göçek – Referee
- Cenk Gönen – Footballer
- Kerem Gönlüm – Basketball player
- Gökhan Gönül – Footballer
- Ali Ferit Gören (1913-1987), Austrian-Turkish Olympic sprinter
- Cevat Güler – former Footballer, Coach
- Muratcan Güler – Basketball player
- Sinan Güler – Basketball player
- Ersan Gülüm – Footballer
- Esra Gümüş – Volleyball player
- Gülşah Gümüşay – female Basketball player
- Damla Günay – Athlete (archery)
- İlkay Gündoğan – Footballer
- Şenol Güneş – former Football Player, Coach
- Eren Güngör – Footballer
- Mert Günok – Footballer
- Gizem Güreşen – Volleyball player

== H ==
- Orhan Hacıyeva – Basketball player
- Tunç Hamarat – Chess placer
- Hamza Hamzaoğlu – former Footballer, Coach
- Tayfur Havutçu – former Footballer, Coach
- Quanitra Hollingsworth – female Basketball player
- Yasemin Horasan – female Basketball player

== I ==
- Daniyar Ismayilov - Weightlifter
- Kemal Izzet – Footballer
- Muzzy Izzet – Footballer

== İ ==
- Tunç İlkin, former Pittsburgh Steelers player and Sports Commentator
- Ersan İlyasova – Basketball player (Milwaukee Bucks)
- Marsel İlhan – Tennis player
- Selçuk İnan – Footballer
- Şaziye İvegin – female Basketball player

== K ==
- Giray Kaçar – Footballer
- Tolunay Kafkas – former Footballer, Coach
- Nihat Kahveci – Footballer
- Enes Kanter - Basketball player (Utah Jazz)
- Hamit Kaplan – Wrestler
- Jem Karacan – Footballer
- Azar Karadas – Footballer
- Tuğba Karademir – Female figure skater
- Ali Karadeniz – Basketball player
- Hikmet Karaman – Coach
- İlkan Karaman – Basketball player
- Orçun Karaoğlanoğlu – Kayaker
- Özge Kavurmacıoğlu – former Basketball player
- Semih Kaya – Footballer
- Suat Kaya – Footballer
- Sümeyra Kaya – Female boxer
- Rıza Kayaalp - Wrestler
- Tugay Kerimoğlu - Footballer
- Zekiye Keskin Satır – Athlete (Archery)
- Tevfik Kış – Wrestler
- Onur Kıvrak – Footballer
- Erkut Kızılırmak - Race car driver
- Şebnem Kimyacıoğlu – female Basketball player
- Ahmet Kireççi – Wrestler
- Aykut Kocaman – former Footballer, Coach
- Bülent Korkmaz – former Footballer, Coach
- Egemen Korkmaz – Footballer
- Göksenin Köksal – Basketball player
- İsmail Köybaşı – Footballer
- Erman Kunter – Coach
- İbrahim Kutluay – former Basketball player
- Ermal Kuqo – Basketball player
- Lefter Küçükandonyadis – Footballer

== M ==
- Oktay Mahmuti – Coach
- Hami Mandıralı – former Footballer
- İlhan Mansız – Footballer
- Damir Mršić – former Basketball player, Team manager
- Halil Mutlu – Weightlifter

== N ==
- Cemal Nalga – Basketball player
- Petar Naumoski – former Basketball player
- Kristen Newlin – female Basketball player

== O ==
- İsmail Ogan – Wrestler
- Mehmet Oktav – Wrestler
- Metin Oktay – Footballer
- Mehmet Okur – former NBA player and 2007 NBA All-Star
- Ibrahim Okyay - Race car driver
- Ömer Onan – Basketball player
- Leon Osman – Footballer
- Levent Osman – Football (soccer) player
- Tamer Oyguç – former Basketball player

== Ö ==
- Aydın Örs – Coach
- Alpay Özalan – Footballer
- Tolgay Özbey – Footballer
- Mehmet Özdilek – former Footballer, Coach
- Cevher Özer – Basketball player
- Mesut Özil – Footballer
- Halis Özkahya – Referee
- Neriman Özsoy – Volleyball player
- Hüseyin Özkan – Judoka
- Oğuzhan Özyakup – Footballer

== P ==
- Zaza Pachulia – Basketball player
- Tuğba Palazoğlu – female Basketball player
- Asım Pars – former Basketball player
- Kaya Peker – Basketball player
- Mustafa Pektemek – Footballer
- Ergün Penbe – former Footballer
- Alper Potuk – Footballer
- Emir Preldžić – Basketball player

== R ==
- Rüştü Reçber – Footballer
- Colin Kazim-Richards, footballer
- Omer Riza, footballer

== S ==
- Ertuğrul Sağlam – former Footballer, Coach
- Nurullah Sağlam – Coach
- Taner Sağır – Weightlifter
- Sinan Şamil Sam – Boxer
- Sercan Sararer – Footballer
- Veysel Sarı – Footballer
- Ufuk Sarıca – former Basketball player, Coach
- Oğuz Savaş – Basketball player
- Semih Saygıner – Billiards player
- Yasemin Saylar– female Basketball player
- Mehmet Scholl – footballer
- Müzahir Sille – Wrestler
- Kenan Sipahi – Basketball player
- Sedat Sir – Australian Rules Football player
- Bahattin Sofuoğlu – Motorcycle racer
- Kenan Sofuoğlu – Motorcycle racer
- Sinan Sofuoğlu – Motorcycle racer
- Fatih Solak – former Basketball player
- Ümit Sonkol – Basketball player
- Gözde Sonsırma – Volleyball player
- İpek Soylu - Female tennis player
- Ercüment Sunter – Coach
- Naim Süleymanoğlu – Weightlifter

== Ş ==
- Olcay Şahan – Footballer
- Hülya Şahin (Julia Şahin) – Female Boxer, Women's International Boxing Federation (WIBF) jr flyweight champion
- Nuri Şahin – Footballer
- Tuncay – Footballer
- Hasan Şaş – former Footballer, Coach
- Volkan Şen – Footballer
- Hülya Şenyurt – Female judoka
- Mert Shumpert – Basketball player
- Bayram Şit – Wrestler
- Hakan Şükür – former Footballer

== T ==
- Jason Tahincioğlu – Auto racing driver
- Mümtaz Tahincioğlu - Auto racing driver
- Ufuk Talay - Football (soccer) player
- Cüneyt Tanman - Footballer
- Bahri Tanrıkulu – Taekwondo athlete
- Serdar Tasci – Footballer
- Ertuğrul Taşkıran – Footballer
- Nur Tatar - Taekwondo athlete
- Ramazan Tavşancıoğlu, football (soccer) player
- Nurcan Taylan – Weightlifter
- Servet Tazegül - Taekwondo athlete
- Fatih Tekke – Footballer
- Fatih Terim – Footballer and coach
- Merve Terzioğlu – Female swimmer
- Hamide Bıkçın Tosun – Female taekwondo athlete
- Bahar Toksoy – Volleyball player
- Mehmet Topal – Footballer
- Ömer Toprak – Footballer
- Levent Topsakal – former Basketball player, Team manager
- İbrahim Toraman – Footballer
- Gökhan Töre – Footballer
- Caner Topaloğlu – Basketball player
- Tunay Torun – Footballer
- Gülnur Tumbat (born 1975) - Mountaineer and ultramarathon runner
- Talat Tunçalp (born c. 1917), Olympian cyclist
- Kerem Tunçeri – Basketball player
- Esmeral Tunçluer – female Basketball player
- Arda Turan – Footballer
- Cemil Turan – Footballer
- Mirsad Türkcan – former Basketball player
- Hidayet Türkoğlu – NBA Basketball player
- İzzet Türkyılmaz – Basketball player
- Uğur Tütüneker – former Footballer, Coach

== U ==
- Oktay Urkal – Boxer
- Binnaz Uslu – Female middle distance track runner
- Polen Uslupehlivan – Volleyball player
- Yasemin Ustalar – Female boxer
- Bülent Uygun – former Footballer, Coach

== Ü ==
- Cengiz Ünder – Footballer
- Hakan Ünsal – former Footballer
- İbrahim Üzülmez former Footballer

== V ==
- Birsel Vardarlı – female Basketball player
- Yılmaz Vural – Coach

== W ==
- Fatima Whitbread – javelin thrower

== Y ==
- Selma Yağcı – Female boxer
- Mehmet Yağmur – Basketball player
- Lev Yalcin – Footballer
- Sergen Yalçın – former Footballer
- Atagün Yalçınkaya - Boxer
- Ersun Yanal – Coach
- Şemsi Yaralı – Female boxer
- Bekir Yarangüme – former Basketball player
- Hamza Yerlikaya – Wrestler
- Bülent Yıldırım – Referee
- Haluk Yıldırım – former Basketball player
- Burak Yılmaz – Footballer
- Sefa Yılmaz – Footballer
- Selçuk Yula – Footballer
- Mustafa Yumlu – Footballer
- Nedim Yücel – Basketball player
- Müjde Yüksel – female Basketball player

== Z ==
- Gökhan Zan – Footballer
- Tolga Zengin – Footballer

== See also ==
- Sports in Turkey
