= Tahincioğlu =

Tahincioğlu is a Turkish surname. Notable people with the surname include:

- Ann Tahincioğlu (born 1956), Turkey's first female racing driver
- Jason Tahincioğlu (born 1983), Turkish racing driver
- Mümtaz Tahincioğlu (born 1952), Turkish racing driver
