= Moh Keen Hoo =

Malaysian snooker player

Moh Keen Ho
Sport
- Country: Malaysia
- Sport: Snooker
- Professional: 2005/2006
- Highest ranking: 92 (2005/2006)
Medal record
Men's snooker
Representing Malaysia
South East Asian Games
Bronze medal – third place	2005 Manila	Individual
Gold medal – first place	2007 Nakhon Ratchasima	Individual
Silver medal – second place	2007 Nakhon Ratchasima	Doubles
Bronze medal – third place	2013 Naypyidaw	Individual
Bronze medal – third place	2013 Naypyidaw	6-red doubles
Gold medal – first place	2015 Singapore	Doubles
Bronze medal – third place	2017 Kuala Lumpur	Doubles
Silver medal – second place	2019 Manila	Individual
Gold medal – first place	2019 Manila	Doubles
Bronze medal – third place	2022 Hanoi	6-red singles
Gold medal – first place	2023 Phnom Penh	6-red singles
Bronze medal – third place	2023 Phnom Penh	6-red doubles
Silver medal – second place	2023 Phnom Penh	Doubles
Gold medal – first place	2025 Bangkok	6-red team
Bronze medal – third place	2025 Bangkok	Team

Moh Keen Ho (莫景皓) is a Malaysian former professional snooker player.

== Career ==
Moh turned professional in 2005, as the winner of the ACBS Asian Under-21 Snooker Championship. In his first season on the main tour, he entered four of the ranking tournaments, but was unable to win a match in any. At the Grand Prix, he was whitewashed 5–0 by Ryan Day, while at the UK Championship, he recovered a 0–3 deficit to lead Paul Davies 7–6, but eventually succumbed 7–9.

In the Malta Cup, he lost 2–5 to Hugh Abernethy, and at the China Open, he again failed to win a frame, losing 5–0 to Scott MacKenzie. Moh withdrew from the 2006 World Championship and, having finished the season ranked 92nd, lost his professional status thereafter.

Moh did not play competitively for the next eight years; however, he entered the 2014 World Amateur Championship, where he overcame five opponents, including Lucky Vatnani and Au Chi-wai, to progress from his group. He reached the last 32, but lost, at this stage, 1–5 to compatriot Thor Chuan Leong.

He reached the same stage at the 2015 edition of the tournament, but having led Syria's Karam Fatima 4–2, could not prevent a 4–5 defeat.

== Performance and rankings timeline ==
Tournament	2005/ 06	2016/ 17
Ranking (Note: It shows the ranking at the beginning of the season)	(Note: New players on the Main Tour don't have a ranking)	(Note: He was an amateur)
Ranking tournaments
World Open (Note: The event was called the Grand Prix (2005/2006))	LQ	A
European Masters (Note: The event was called the Malta Cup (2005/2006))	LQ	A
UK Championship	LQ	A
World Grand Prix	NH	DNQ
Welsh Open	WD	A
Players Championship	NH	DNQ
China Open	LQ	A
World Championship	WD	A
Non-ranking tournaments
Six-red World Championship	NH	RR

Performance Table Legend
LQ	lost in the qualifying draw	#R	lost in the early rounds of the tournament (WR = Wildcard round, RR = Round robin)	QF	lost in the quarter-finals
SF	lost in the semi-finals	F	lost in the final	W	won the tournament
DNQ	did not qualify for the tournament	A	did not participate in the tournament	WD	withdrew from the tournament

NH / Not Held	means an event was not held.
NR / Non-Ranking Event	means an event is/was no longer a ranking event.
R / Ranking Event	means an event is/was a ranking event.
MR / Minor-Ranking Event	means an event is/was a minor-ranking event.
VF / Variant Format Event	means an event is/was a variant format event.

== Career finals ==
=== Team finals: 1 ===
Outcome	No.	Year	Championship	Team/Partner	Opponent(s) in the final	Score
Runner-up	1.	2023	Southeast Asian Games	Malaysia; Lim Kok Leong	Cambodia; Men Sophanith; Suon Chhay	1–3

=== Pro-am finals: 3 (2 titles) ===
Outcome	No.	Year	Championship	Opponent in the final	Score
Winner	1.	2007	Southeast Asian Games	(Thailand) Noppadol Sangnil	4–1
Runner-up	1.	2019	Southeast Asian Games	(Thailand) Kritsanut Lertsattayathorn	2–4
Winner	2.	2023	Southeast Asian Games (six-red)	(Laos) Sithideth Sakbieng	5–3

=== Amateur finals: 6 (4 titles) ===
Outcome	No.	Year	Championship	Opponent in the final	Score
Runner-up	1.	2004	Asian Under-21 Snooker Championship	(Thailand) Pramual Janthat	4–6
Winner	1.	2005	Asian Under-21 Snooker Championship	(Thailand) Kobkit Palajin	6–3
Winner	2.	2010	Malaysian Amateur Championship	(Malaysia) Lai Chee Wei	6–3
Runner-up	2.	2016	Asian 6-red Championship	(India) Pankaj Advani	5–7
Winner	3.	2018	Australian Open Championship	(Australia) Kurt Dunham	6–1
Winner	4.	2019	Australian Open Championship	(Australia) Steve Mifsud	6–5
