= Müjde =

Müjde is a feminine Turkish given name meaning 'good news' or 'glad tidings' in Turkish.

== People ==
=== Given name ===
- Müjde Ar (born 1954), Turkish film actress
- Müjde Uzman (born 1984), Turkish actress
- Müjde Yüksel (born 1981), Turkish female basketball player

=== Middle name ===
- Güzin Müjde Karakaşlı (born 1991), Turkish female carom billiard player and lawyer

=== Surname ===
- Atakan Müjde (born 2003), Turkish footballer
