= Güzin =

Güzin is a Turkish given name for females. People named Güzin include:

- Güzin Dino (1910–2013), Turkish literary scholar, linguist, translator and writer
- Güzin Müjde Karakaşlı (born 1991), Turkish carom billiard player
