= Lim Kok Leong =

Malaysian snooker player (born 1995)

Personal information
- Born: 18 May 1995 (age 31)

Sport
- Country: Malaysia
- Sport: Snooker
- Professional: 2024–2026
- Highest ranking: 99 (July 2025)
- Current ranking: (as of 4 October 2026)
- Best ranking finish: Last 64 (2024 British Open)
Medal record
Men's Snooker
Representing Malaysia
Southeast Asian Games
Gold medal – first place	2019 Manila	Doubles
Gold medal – first place	2021 Hanoi	6-red singles
Gold medal – first place	2025 Bangkok	6-red team
Silver medal – second place	2021 Hanoi	Individual
Silver medal – second place	2023 Phnom Penh	Doubles
Bronze medal – third place	2023 Phnom Penh	Individual
Bronze medal – third place	2023 Phnom Penh	6-red doubles
Bronze medal – third place	2025 Bangkok	Team

Lim Kok Leong (Chinese: 林谷良) is a Malaysian former professional snooker player. He won the 2022 IBSF World Snooker Championship, and was awarded a two-year tour card that began from the 2024-25 snooker season.

== Career ==
=== Snooker ===
In May 2022 he was runner-up to James Wattana at the delayed 2021 Southeast Asian Games snooker tournament. His run to the final included a 4-0 semi-final win against Passakorn Suwanawat. He also won the Men's snooker 6-red singles at the same event. That win was reported to be on his 27th birthday, on 18 May 2022, and included a 5-3 win the final against Jeffrey Roda of the Philippines.

In November 2022 he beat Amir Sarkhosh of Iran 5-0 in the final of the IBSF World Snooker Championship player in Antalya, Turkey. His run to the final included a 4-0 win over Eden Sharav. He became the first Malaysian snooker player to win the amateur title.

In May 2023 he was a bronze medal winner at the 2023 SEA Games, losing to Sunny Akani at the semi-final stage of the individual competition.

In May 2024, he defeated Liang Xiaolong to reach the final round of the Asian Q School in Bangkok, where he beat former professional Gao Yang 4-3 to secure a two-year card on the main WST Tour.

The tour card was only used twice: these were the qualifying rounds for the 2024 Wuhan Open and the 2024 British Open, from 28th July to 3rd August. Leong lost 1–5 to Dylan Emery in the Wuhan Open qualifiers, but defeated Anthony Hamilton by 4–1 in the British Open qualifiers, and would have played Mark Selby in the main stages of that event, but then withdrew from competing on the tour completely, resulting in his automatic falling off the tour at the conclusion of the 2025-26 snooker season.

The reasons for the withdrawals remain unknown, due to no statement being provided from either the World Snooker Tour or the WPBSA, the governing body.

Competing at the 2025 SEA Games, he won the gold medal in the 6-red team event alongside Thor Chuan Leong and Moh Keen Hoo.

=== Doubles ===
He is a twice winner of the International Billiards and Snooker Federation (ISBF) World Team Championships. In 2015 Lim Kok Leong won the partnered with Moh Keen Hoo, in Karachi, Pakistan after a narrow 5-4 win in the final over home team Asjad Iqbal and Shahid Aftab. In 2019 he and Moh Keen Ho won gold at the Southeast Asian Games defeating Philippines’ Alvin Barberro and Jefrey Roda 3-1 in the best-of-5 final. In October 2022 he won the World Team Snooker Championship in Kuala Lumpur, again with Moh Keen Hoo. They beat Thai pair Kritsanut Lertsattayathorn-Jong and Rak Boonrod 4-2 in the final. In May 2023 he was a silver medal winner at the 2023 SEA Games in Phnom Penh, losing with Moh Keen Hoo to Cambodian pair Suon Chhay and Men Sophanith in the final.

== Career finals ==
=== Team finals: 3 (2 titles) ===
Outcome	No.	Year	Championship	Team/Partner	Opponent(s) in the final	Score
Winner	1.	2019	Southeast Asian Games	Malaysia; Moh Keen Hoo	Philippines; Alvin Barbero; Jefrey Roda	3–1
Winner	2.	2022	IBSF Team Snooker Championships	Malaysia 1 Moh Keen Hoo	Thailand 2 Kritsanut Lertsattayathorn; Jongrak Boonrod	4–2
Runner-up	1.	2023	Southeast Asian Games	Malaysia; Moh Keen Hoo	Cambodia; Men Sophanith; Suon Chhay	1–3

=== Pro-am finals: 2 (1 title) ===
Outcome	No.	Year	Championship	Opponent in the final	Score
Winner	1.	2021	Southeast Asian Games (six-red)	(Philippines) Jefrey Roda	5–3
Runner-up	1.	2021	Southeast Asian Games	(Thailand) James Wattana	2–4

=== Amateur finals: 3 (3 title) ===
Outcome	No.	Year	Championship	Opponent in the final	Score
Winner	1.	2019	Malaysian Amateur Championship	(Malaysia) Hng Yuan Yew	6–4
Winner	2.	2022	Malaysian Amateur Championship (2)	(Malaysia) Thor Chuan Leong	8–5
Winner	3.	2022	IBSF World Snooker Championship	(Iran) Amir Sarkhosh	5–0
Winner	4.	2024	Malaysian Amateur Championship (3)	(Malaysia) Mohammed Reza Hassan	8–2
