= UMB Women's World Three-cushion Championship =

Professional billiards championship

Tournament information
- Organisation(s): UMB
- Format: Round Robin / single-elimination
- Recent edition: 2026
- Current champion: (Netherlands) Therese Klompenhouwer

The UMB World Three-cushion Championship is a professional Three-cushion billiards championship first held in 1999 for female players, with the men's event being contested since 1928.

== Results ==
The list of winners is shown below.

Year	Location	Winner	GA	Runner-up	GA	Semi-finalist	GA	Semi-finalist	GA
1999	Heemstede	(Japan) Orie Hida	1,080	(Netherlands) Gerrie Geelen	0,723	(Belgium) Maggy Bley	0,517	(Austria) Natascha Al-Mamar	0,387
2002	Gandia	(Japan) Orie Hida	0,857	(Japan) Ayako Maehara	0,572	(Japan) Kazumi Hida	0,652	(Turkey) Gülşen Degener	0,581
World Three-cushion Championship
2004	Valencia	(Japan) Orie Hida	0,718	(Netherlands) Gerrie Geelen	0,578	(Japan) Akane Imaizumi	0,600	(Japan) Ayako Maehara	0,715
2006	Hoensbroek	(Japan) Orie Hida	0,815	(Netherlands) Therese Klompenhouwer	0,701	(Turkey) Gülşen Degener	0,601	(Japan) Ayako Maehara	0,878
2008	Sivas	(Japan) Orie Hida	0,947	(Netherlands) Karina Jetten	0,523	(Turkey) Gülşen Degener	0,543	(South Korea) Park Su-ah	0,480
2012	Tokyo	(Japan) Natsumi Higashiuchi	0,753	(Japan) Yuko Nishimoto	0,773	(Japan) Ayaka Fukumoto	0,693	(Japan) Namiko Hayashi	0,633
2014	Sinop	(Netherlands) Therese Klompenhouwer	1,102	(Japan) Yuko Nishimoto	0,733	(South Korea) Lee Shin-young	0,660	(Belgium) Danielle le Bruijn	0,605
2016	Guri	(Netherlands) Therese Klompenhouwer	1,122	(South Korea) Lee Mee-rae	0,825	(Japan) Yuko Nishimoto	0,677	(Japan) Orie Hida	0,881
2017	Zoersel	(Japan) Orie Hida	0,868	(South Korea) Lee Mee-rae	0,640	(Turkey) Gülşen Degener	0,703	(Denmark) Marianne Mortensen	0,601
2018	Izmir	(Netherlands) Therese Klompenhouwer	0,887	(Japan) Orie Hida	1,082	(Cambodia) Sruong Pheavy	0,884	(Turkey) Gülşen Degener	0,729
2019	Valencia	(Netherlands) Therese Klompenhouwer	1,125	(Japan) Orie Hida	0,981	(Cambodia) Sruong Pheavy	0,696	(Japan) Ayako Sakai	0,664
2022	Heerhugowaard	(Netherlands) Therese Klompenhouwer	1,393	(South Korea) Han Jieun	0,776	(Japan) Yuko Nishimoto	0,605	(Japan) Noriko Fukao	0,596
2023	Ankara	(South Korea) Lee Shin-young	0,894	(Japan) Yuko Nishimoto	0,882	(South Korea) Kim Hae-un	0,782	(Netherlands) Mirjam Pruim	0,570
2024	Blois	(Denmark) Charlotte Sørensen	0,821	(Netherlands) Therese Klompenhouwer	1,069	(Netherlands) Karina Jetten	0,675	(Vietnam) Nguyễn Hoàng Yến Nhi	0,616
2025	Cartagena	(Netherlands) Therese Klompenhouwer	1,111	(South Korea) Kim Ha-eun	0,961	(South Korea) Choi Bo-mi	0,675	(Vietnam) Nguyễn Thị Liên	0,616
2026	Gradignan	(Turkey) Güzin Karakaşlı	0,779	(Netherlands) Karina Jetten	0,802	(Netherlands) Therese Klompenhouwer	0,938	(Vietnam) Nguyễn Đức Yến Sinh	0,704

== Medals (1999-2026) ==
Rank	Nation	Gold	Silver	Bronze	Total
1	Japan	7	6	11	24
2	Netherlands	6	6	3	15
3	South Korea	1	4	4	9
4	Turkey	1	0	5	6
5	Denmark	1	0	1	2
6	Vietnam	0	0	3	3
7	Belgium	0	0	2	2
7	Cambodia	0	0	2	2
9	Austria	0	0	1	1
Totals (9 entries)		16	16	32	64

== See also ==
- UMB World Three-cushion Championship
