= Therese Klompenhouwer =

Dutch billiards player (born 1983)

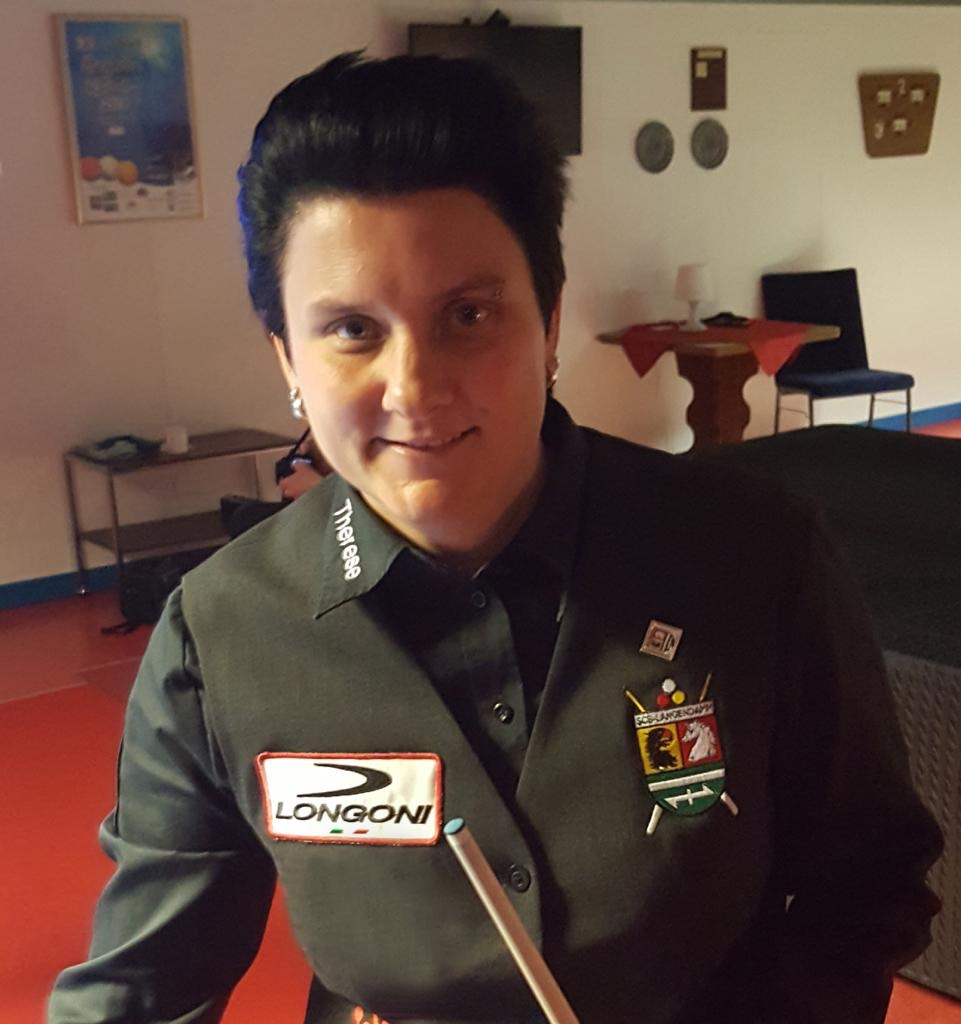
- Klompenhouwer in 2017

Personal information
- Nationality: Netherlands
- Born: 3 January 1983 (age 43) Nijkerk, Netherlands

Sport
- Country: Netherlands
- Sport: Three-cushion billiards
Medal record
Representing Netherlands
Three-cushion billiards
World Games
Gold medal – first place	2025 Chengdu	Singles
UMB Women's World Three-cushion Championship
Gold medal – first place	2014 Sinop	Individual
Gold medal – first place	2016 Guri	Individual
Gold medal – first place	2018 İzmir	Individual
Gold medal – first place	2019 Valencia	Individual
Gold medal – first place	2022 Heerhugowaard	Individual
Gold medal – first place	2025 Cartagena	Individual
Silver medal – second place	2006 Hoensbroek	Individual
Silver medal – second place	2024 Blois	Individual

Therese Klompenhouwer (born 3 January 1983) is a Dutch carom billiards player who specializes in three-cushion event. She won the UMB Women's World Three-cushion Championship six times, the joint-most of any player. Klompenhouwer won the European Ladies 3-Cushion Championship a record 13 times. She is also a gold medalist at the World Games.

== Career ==
Klompenhouwer initially played free game before switching to three-cushion billiards at the age of 19, a sport she has remained loyal to ever since. The 1.67 m tall Dutch player was coached and trained by Christ van der Smissen for many years.

At the 2006 Women's World Championships, Klompenhouwer finished second behind the perennial champion Orie Hida from Japan, and at the third World Cup of the year, she set the highest series (HS) of 12.

In her first appearance at the Three-Cushion World Cup in Hurghada in 2012, Klompenhouwer reached the qualifying round of the last 64 and finished in 51st place. In February 2013, she finished 77th at the World Cup tournament in Antalya, Turkey.

In early May 2013, Klompenhouwer won the "Femina Belgian Open" in Zoersel. In the semi-final, she first defeated her long-time rival Karina Jetten, and in the final, she successfully beat the Japanese player Namiko Hayashi 30–17 in 31 innings. At the Verhoeven Open (Ladies) in New York in July, Klompenhouwer defeated four-time world champion Orie Hida 25–16 in 17 innings in the final, winning her second consecutive title. She also played the "Best Game" of the tournament in the final, averaging 1.471. She then participated in the regular Verhoeven Open, winning three out of four first-round matches against Steve Anderson of the USA (25–18; 34 innings; ED 0.735), Manuel Lindao of Ecuador (25–11; 10 innings; ED 2.500 – a personal best!), and Gang Won-sik of South Korea (25–22; 35 innings; ED 0.714). She was only defeated 12–25 by Michael Kang, the owner of the venue (Carom Café) and a friend of former co-owner Sang Lee. With her new personal best individual average of 2.500, Klompenhouwer even surpassed such greats as Eddy Merckx and Eddy Leppens.

Klompenhouwer competed in the 2025 World Games. After defeating Charlotte Sørensen in the semi-finals, she defeated Ayaka Miyashita to win the gold medal.

== Personal life ==
Klompenhouwer grew up in Nijkerk, a municipality in the Dutch province of Gelderland, where she still lives. She started playing billiards at the age of eight. She comes from a family of billiard players; her grandfather, mother, father, and uncle all played billiards. Her brother Jarno is also a good billiard player. She married her long-time partner Eveline van der Meer in 2023 and has two daughters.
