= Billiards and snooker at the 2023 SEA Games =

Billiards at the 2023 SEA Games
- Venue: Aeon 2, Sen Sok City
- Location: Phnom Penh, Cambodia
- Dates: 7–14 May 2023

Billiards competitions at the 2023 SEA Games took place at Aeon 2, Sen Sok City in Phnom Penh, Cambodia from 7 to 14 May 2023.

== Medal table ==
* Host nation (Cambodia)

Rank	Nation	Gold	Silver	Bronze	Total
1	Myanmar	3	0	2	5
2	Vietnam	2	3	3	8
3	Malaysia	2	2	2	6
4	Cambodia*	2	0	4	6
5	Thailand	1	1	6	8
6	Laos	0	2	0	2
6	Singapore	0	2	0	2
8	Philippines	0	0	2	2
9	Indonesia	0	0	1	1
Totals (9 entries)		10	10	20	40

== Medalists ==
=== Carom ===
Event	Gold	Silver	Bronze
Men's 3-cushion carom	Nguyễn Trần Thanh Tự; Vietnam	Nguyễn Đức Anh Chiến; Vietnam	Francisco Dela Cruz; Philippines
Men's 3-cushion carom	Nguyễn Trần Thanh Tự; Vietnam	Nguyễn Đức Anh Chiến; Vietnam	Woo Donghoon; Cambodia
Women's 1-cushion carom	Lê Thị Ngọc Huệ; Vietnam	Phùng Kiện Tường; Vietnam	Sruong Pheavy; Cambodia
Women's 1-cushion carom	Lê Thị Ngọc Huệ; Vietnam	Phùng Kiện Tường; Vietnam	Panchaya Channoi; Thailand
Women's 3-cushion carom	Sruong Pheavy; Cambodia	Nguyễn Hoàng Yến Nhi; Vietnam	Phùng Kiện Tường; Vietnam
Women's 3-cushion carom	Sruong Pheavy; Cambodia	Nguyễn Hoàng Yến Nhi; Vietnam	Santhinee Jaisuekul; Thailand

=== Pool ===
Event	Gold	Silver	Bronze
Men's 9-ball pool singles	Phone Myint Kyaw; Myanmar	Aloysius Yapp; Singapore	Tạ Văn Linh; Vietnam
Men's 9-ball pool singles	Phone Myint Kyaw; Myanmar	Aloysius Yapp; Singapore	Nguyễn Anh Tuấn; Vietnam
Men's 9-ball pool doubles	Myanmar; Phone Myint Kyaw; Thaw Zin Htet	Malaysia; Darryl Chia; Muhammad Almie Yakup	Thailand; Preecha Boonmoung; Sompol Saetang
Men's 9-ball pool doubles	Myanmar; Phone Myint Kyaw; Thaw Zin Htet	Malaysia; Darryl Chia; Muhammad Almie Yakup	Philippines; Carlo Biado; Johann Chua

=== Snooker ===
Event	Gold	Silver	Bronze
Men's English billiard singles	Pauk Sa; Myanmar	Peter Gilchrist; Singapore	Praprut Chaithanasakun; Thailand
Men's English billiard singles	Pauk Sa; Myanmar	Peter Gilchrist; Singapore	Yuttapop Pakpoj; Thailand
Men's snooker singles	Thor Chuan Leong; Malaysia	Sunny Akani; Thailand	Lim Kok Leong; Malaysia
Men's snooker singles	Thor Chuan Leong; Malaysia	Sunny Akani; Thailand	Men Sophanith; Cambodia
Men's snooker doubles	Cambodia; Men Sophanith; Suon Chhay	Malaysia; Lim Kok Leong; Moh Keen Hoo	Indonesia; Gebby Adi Wibawa Putra; Dhendy Khristanto
Men's snooker doubles	Cambodia; Men Sophanith; Suon Chhay	Malaysia; Lim Kok Leong; Moh Keen Hoo	Myanmar; Nay Min Tun; Phone Myint Kyaw
Men's snooker 6-red singles	Moh Keen Hoo; Malaysia	Siththideth Sakbieng; Laos	Poramin Danjirakul; Thailand
Men's snooker 6-red singles	Moh Keen Hoo; Malaysia	Siththideth Sakbieng; Laos	Hein Lwin Moe; Myanmar
Men's snooker 6-red doubles	Thailand; Kritsanut Lertsattayathorn; Wattana Pu-Ob-Orm	Laos; Siththideth Sakbieng; Suriya Minalavong	Cambodia; Suon Chhay; Thay Tech Hok
Men's snooker 6-red doubles	Thailand; Kritsanut Lertsattayathorn; Wattana Pu-Ob-Orm	Laos; Siththideth Sakbieng; Suriya Minalavong	Malaysia; Lim Kok Leong; Moh Keen Hoo
