= Sruong Pheavy =

Cambodian billiards player

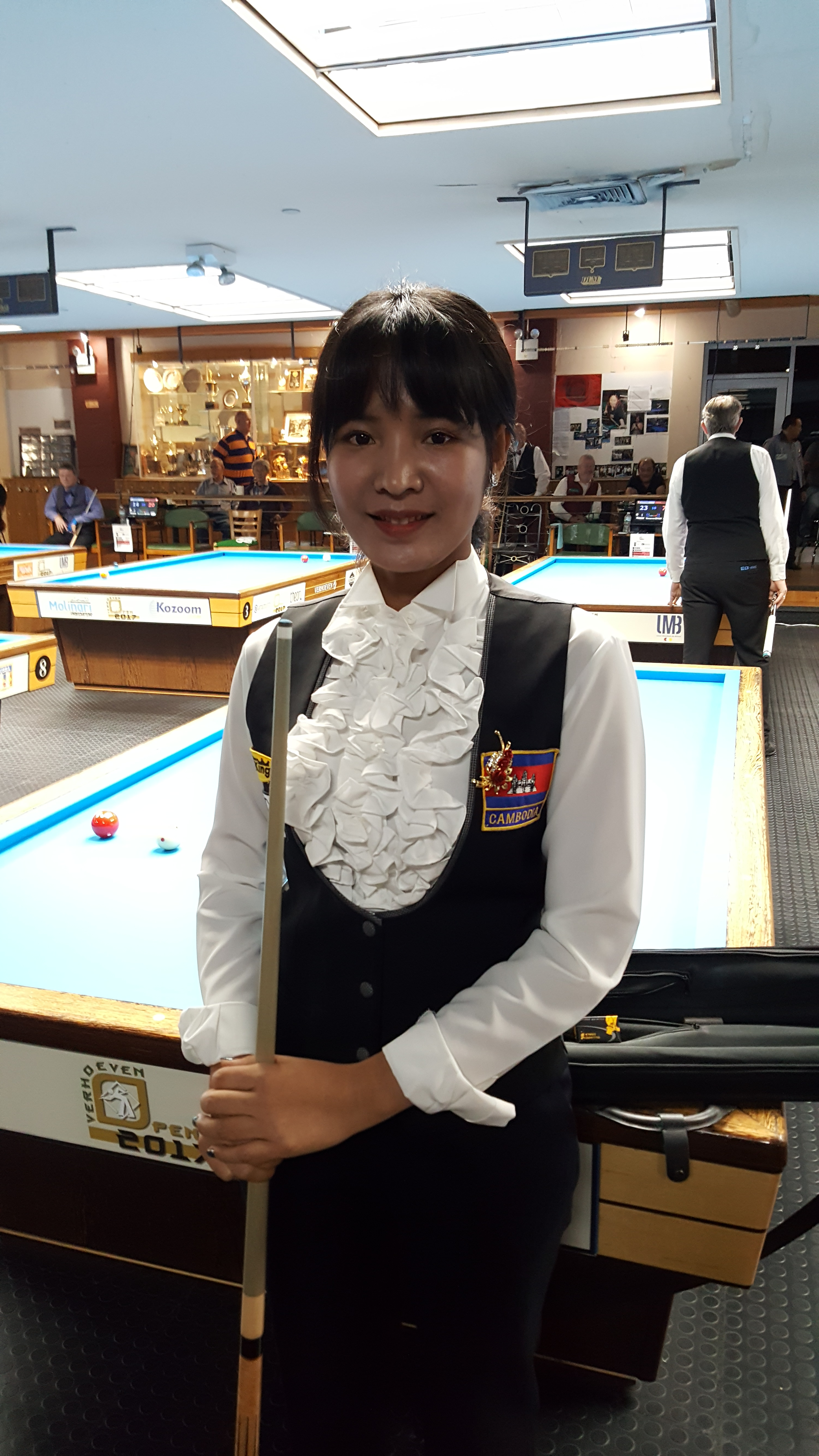
- Pheavy in 2017

Personal information
- Native name: ស្រួង ភាវី
- Full name: Sruong Pheavy
- Nationality: Cambodian
- Born: 12 September 1990 (age 36) Tbong Khmum, Cambodia
- Home town: Suwon, South Korea

Sport
- Country: Cambodia
- Sport: Three-cushion billiards
Medal record
Representing Cambodia
Three-cushion billiards
UMB Women's World Three-cushion Championship
Bronze medal – third place	2018 İzmir	Women's 3-cushion carom
Bronze medal – third place	2019 Valencia	Women's 3-cushion carom
Southeast Asian Games
Gold medal – first place	2023 Cambodia	Women's 3-cushion carom
Bronze medal – third place	2023 Cambodia	Women's 1-cushion carom

Sruong Pheavy (Khmer: ស្រួង ភាវី, Korean: 스롱 피아비) is a Cambodian carom billiards player specialized in thiree-cushion event. She is widely well known in Cambodia and South Korea. She finished third twice in the UMB Women's World Three-cushion Championship.

== Career ==
She began her journey by taking second place in an amateur competition in 2013. She introduced herself internationally at the Jennifer Shim trophy 2015 in New York where she impressed everyone, even the world's best, Therese Klompenhouwer by finished second place. After turning professional in January 2016, she won three national tournaments.

In June 2018, the Cambodian government set up the Cambodian Billiard and Snooker Federation for Pheavy. She participated in the 2018 UMB Women's World Three-cushion Championship, which took place at İzmir, Turkey, and she won the bronze medal. Pheavy received a cash reward of $15,000 from the Cambodian government for her win and was ranked World No. 14.

She won the ZANCA 1st Asian Championship Ladies 3-Cushion 2018 held in Seoul, the Republic of Korea, in which she jumped to third place behind Therese Klompenhouwer of the Netherlands and Gulsen Degener from Turkey in the global rankings.

A year later, she won another bronze medal at the 2019 UMB Women's World Three-cushion Championship held in Valencia, Spain. In 2021, she won the Blue One Resort LPBA Championship in the Republic of Korea, adding the trophy to her collections.

She made her SEA Games debut in 2023 SEA Games and won a gold medal for the Women's 3-cushion carom and a bronze medal for the Women's 1-cushion carom. She also won PBA-LPBA Championship at Ansan, South Korea.

== Personal life ==
Sruong Pheavy was born and grew up in Tbong Khmum at her parents' potato farm. She has two sisters, Sroung Srey Nich and Srong Phara, who are younger than her and still live there. She met her husband, Kim Man-sik, and married at the age of 20.

She migrated to South Korea in 2011, hoping to help support her family who were living in poverty. Pheavy saw a billiard room for the first time in Cheongju and was devoted to the sport. Her popularity in Cambodia has continued to grow thanks to her public relations activities. Pheavy owes this to her active role on Facebook. Pheavy helps poor regions visiting street markets and other gatherings with her Facebook posts thanks to money from fundraising campaigns in Korea for school children. Pheavy recently sent hand sanitizers to Cambodia to help prevent COVID-19. She received the most recent award in recognition of her contribution to various family groups and broadening the family culture by giving free billiards lessons for multicultural children, fundraising and after-school carom classes.

Phnom Penh Commercial Bank, a lender in Cambodia wholly owned by South Korean JB Financial Group, signed sponsorship with Sruong Pheavy. She also was sponsored by SILKROAD in 2018.

In June 2019, in South Korea, the Ministry of Gender Equality and Family appointed her, along with eighteen others, as a multicultural family ambassador to encourage exchanges between migrants of different nationalities. During the South Korea 'ASEAN Top' late last year, the Korean Ministry of Culture, Sports and Tourism filmed an interview with Pheavy promoting coffee from Asian countries at a big square in Seoul.

In March 2023, Pheavy posted on her Facebook page, searching for 15 Cambodians who have open heart disease to get treatment by Korean doctors, who will travel to Cambodia and be treated in Korea.

After winning medals at the 2023 SEA Games, Pheavy decided to donate the money earned from winning to charity, to help poor people in rural areas. She noted on her Facebook page, translating from Khmer to English "All the money I have won in the competition, win or lose, no matter how small, I collect into all the charitable funds. And, of course, I do not have a lot of wealth, but I do this because I want to show that all activities before and now and in the future are the same to help young people in Cambodia who need help, want to seek learning and take knowledge, to my future, both heart and life, I sacrifice for Cambodia. Thank you very much."

She is also an ambassador to her national airlines, Sky Angkor. She donated all her money earned to charity.

== Honours ==
2018

- (bronze) 2019 UMB Women's World Three-cushion Championship, İzmir, Turkey
- (gold) ZANCA 1st Asian Championship Ladies 3-Cushion, Seoul, South Korea

2019

- (bronze) 2019 UMB Women's World Three-cushion Championship, Valencia, Spain

2021

- (gold) 2021 Blue One Resort LPBA Championship, South Korea

2023

- (gold) Women's 3-cushion carom, Phnom Penh, Cambodia
- (bronze) Women's 1-cushion carom, Phnom Penh, Cambodia
