= Billiards and snooker at the 2025 SEA Games =

Billiards and Snooker at the 2025 SEA Games
- Venue: Thunder Dome Building, Muang Thong Thani
- Location: Nonthaburi, Thailand
- Dates: 10–18 December 2025

Billiards and snooker competitions at the 2025 SEA Games took place at Thunder Dome Building in Muang Thong Thani, Pak Kret, Nonthaburi, from 10 to 18 December 2025.

== Medal table ==
* Host nation (Thailand)

Rank	Nation	Gold	Silver	Bronze	Total
1	Thailand*	6	4	3	13
2	Malaysia	2	0	5	7
3	Myanmar	1	1	3	5
3	Singapore	1	1	3	5
5	Indonesia	0	2	3	5
6	Laos	0	1	2	3
7	Philippines	0	1	1	2
Totals (7 entries)		10	10	20	40

== Medalists ==
=== Billiards ===
Event	Gold	Silver	Bronze
Men's singles	Singapore; Peter Gilchrist	Myanmar; Pauk Sa	Thailand; Yuttapop Pakpoj
Men's singles	Singapore; Peter Gilchrist	Myanmar; Pauk Sa	Thailand; Praprut Chaithanasakun
Men's team	Myanmar; Pauk Sa; Nay Thway Oo; Aung Htay	Singapore; Peter Gilchrist; Karthik Ramaswamy	Thailand; Praprut Chaithanasakun; Thawat Sujaritthurakarn; Yuttapop Pakpoj
Men's team	Myanmar; Pauk Sa; Nay Thway Oo; Aung Htay	Singapore; Peter Gilchrist; Karthik Ramaswamy	Indonesia; Marlando Sihombing; Toni Setiadi; Gebby Adi Wibawa Putra

=== Snooker ===
Event	Gold	Silver	Bronze
Men's singles	Thailand; Passakorn Suwannawat	Thailand; Kritsanut Lertsattayathorn	Myanmar; Phone Myint Kyaw
Men's singles	Thailand; Passakorn Suwannawat	Thailand; Kritsanut Lertsattayathorn	Malaysia; Thor Chuan Leong
Men's team	Thailand; Passakorn Suwannawat; Kritsanut Lertsattayathorn; Nattanapong Chaikul	Laos; Suriya Minalavong; Phonesavanh Xaphakdy; Sitthideth Sakbieng	Malaysia; Thor Chuan Leong; Lim Kok Leong; Moh Keen Hoo
Men's team	Thailand; Passakorn Suwannawat; Kritsanut Lertsattayathorn; Nattanapong Chaikul	Laos; Suriya Minalavong; Phonesavanh Xaphakdy; Sitthideth Sakbieng	Myanmar; Kyaw Phone Myint; Phyo Aung; Aung Myo Thura
Women's singles	Thailand; Nutcharut Wongharuthai	Thailand; Panchaya Channoi	Indonesia; Annabella Putri Yohana
Women's singles	Thailand; Nutcharut Wongharuthai	Thailand; Panchaya Channoi	Laos; Daoheuang Sihalath
Women's team	Thailand; Panchaya Channoi; Nutcharut Wongharuthai; Ploychompoo Laokiatphong	Indonesia; Annabella Putri Yohana; Emilia Putri Rahmanda	Singapore; Zeet Huey Charlene Chai; Pei Fen Audrey Chua
Women's team	Thailand; Panchaya Channoi; Nutcharut Wongharuthai; Ploychompoo Laokiatphong	Indonesia; Annabella Putri Yohana; Emilia Putri Rahmanda	Laos; Nimith Inthavong; Daoheuang Sihalath

=== 6-red snooker ===
Event	Gold	Silver	Bronze
Men's singles	Malaysia; Thor Chuan Leong	Thailand; Poramin Danjirakul	Myanmar; Nay Min Tun
Men's singles	Malaysia; Thor Chuan Leong	Thailand; Poramin Danjirakul	Philippines; Michael Angelo Mengorio
Men's team	Malaysia; Thor Chuan Leong; Lim Kok Leong; Moh Keen Hoo	Philippines; Basil Hassan Al-Shajjar; Michael Angelo Mengorio; Alvin Barbero	Singapore; Jia Jun Ong; Keng Kwang Chan
Men's team	Malaysia; Thor Chuan Leong; Lim Kok Leong; Moh Keen Hoo	Philippines; Basil Hassan Al-Shajjar; Michael Angelo Mengorio; Alvin Barbero	Indonesia; Dhendy Krhistanto; Gebby Putra; Marlando Sihombing
Women's singles	Thailand; Baipat Siripaporn	Thailand; Nutcharut Wongharuthai	Malaysia; Bronica Kai Yin Song
Women's singles	Thailand; Baipat Siripaporn	Thailand; Nutcharut Wongharuthai	Malaysia; Kim Mei Tan
Women's team	Thailand; Baipat Siripaporn; Narucha Phoemphul; Ploychompoo Laokiatphong	Indonesia; Annabella Putri Yohana; Emilia Putri Rahmanda	Malaysia; Kim Mei Tan; Bronica Kai Yin Song
Women's team	Thailand; Baipat Siripaporn; Narucha Phoemphul; Ploychompoo Laokiatphong	Indonesia; Annabella Putri Yohana; Emilia Putri Rahmanda	Singapore; Chai Zeet Huey Charlene; Chua Pei Fen Audrey
