= List of Turkish weightlifters =

This is a list of notable, active and retired, international weightlifter of the Republic of Turkey.

== Active ==
=== Women ===
==== 48 kg ====
- Nurdan Karagöz
- Şaziye Okur
- Sibel Özkan
- Nurcan Taylan

==== 53 kg ====
- Ayşegül Çoban

==== 58 kg ====
- Aylin Daşdelen

==== 69 kg ====
- Sibel Şimşek

==== 75 kg ====
- Şule Şahbaz

==== +75 kg ====
- Dilara Uçan
- Ümmühan Uçar

=== Men ===
==== 56 kg ====
- Sedat Artuç
- Gökhan Kılıç
- Halil Mutlu

==== 62 kg ====
- Hurşit Atak
- Erol Bilgin
- Bünyamin Sezer

==== 69 kg ====
- Mete Binay
- Daniyar Ismayilov

==== 77 kg ====
- Reyhan Arabacıoğlu
- Taner Sağır
- Semih Yağcı

==== 85 kg ====
- İzzet İnce

==== 94 kg ====
- Hakan Yılmaz

==== 105 kg ====
- Bünyamin Sudaş

== Retired ==
=== Men ===
==== 60 kg ====
- Cemal Erçman
- Naim Süleymanoğlu
