= Burak Değer Biçer =

Jiu-Jitsu practitioners

- Born: March 16, 1977 (age 49); Istanbul, Turkey
- Nationality: (Turkey) Turkish
- Division: Middleweight
- Style: Brazilian Jiu-Jitsu
- Team: Corvos
- Rank: Black Belt in Brazilian Jiu-Jitsu

Burak Değer Biçer (born March 16, 1977) is a Turkish Brazilian Jiu-Jitsu practitioner and competitor. He holds a black belt under Ricardo Vieira and currently represents ADCC in Turkey.
