= Ann Tahincioğlu =

Turkish car racing driver

Ann Tahincioglu
- Nationality: Turkish
- Born: 1956 (age 69–70)
- Relatives: Mümtaz Tahincioğlu (spouse); Jason Tahincioğlu (son)
- Debut season: 1986
- Championships: Volkswagen Polo Ladies' Cup

Ann Tahincioğlu (born 1956) is a Turkish car racer. She was Turkey's first female car racing driver to have competed in the Turkish Racetrack Championship in 1992. Her spouse, her daughter, and her son all had racing careers.

== Sport career ==
Tahincioğlu started her racing driver career in 1986 inspired by her spouse, racing car driver Mümtaz Tahincioğlu. In 1992 she competed in the Turkish Racetrack Championship (Turkish: Türkiye Pist Şampiyonası), becoming the country's first female car racing driver.

In April 2005, she accompanied her spouse as co-pilot in a 1951 Jaguar at "Hilton Istanbul Classic Cars Rally" running over Sarıyer and Silivri in Istanbul Province. In 2005, the "Volkswagen Polo Ladies' Cup Turkey" was launched as Turkey's first all-women car race, promoted by the German car maker. The venue was the newly opened Istanbul Park as the Formula One Grand Prix circuit. The race cars were Volkswagen Mk4 Polo GTs, imported especially for this competition purpose from Germany, featuring a 1.9-litre TDI engine of 130 PS (96 kW) and a six-speed gearbox. The competition consisted of five legs, four of which were held in Turkey, and one leg took place at Lausitzring (Euro Speedway) in Klettwitz, Germany. At the age of 49, Tahincioğlu finished the 2005 Volkswagen Polo Ladies' Cup Turkey in first place. In 2006, she was runner-up in the same competition. She continued to race at the Volkswagen Polo Ladies' Cup Turkey in 2008 as well.

In 2006, she was appointed jury member for the selection of 25 mini-karting drivers out of 100 children.

== Personal life ==
Tahincioğlu's spouse, Mümtaz Tahincioğlu (born 1952), is a former racing car driver and long-time president of the Turkish Motorsports Federation (Turkish: Türkiye Otomobil Sporları Federasyonu, TOSFED). Her son Jason Tahincioğlu (born 1983) is a Turkish-British racing driver. Her daughter Raina Linden Tahincioglu (born 1982), a long-time karting racer. She competed with her mother in the SEAT Cup in 2005.
