= Mümtaz Tahincioğlu =

Turkish racing driver

Mumtaz Tahincioglu
- Nationality: Turkish
- Born: 1952 (age 73–74) Mardin, Turkey
- Relatives: Ann Tahincioğlu, Jason Tahincioğlu
- Championships: Turkish Formula Three Championship
- Statistics up to date as of September 19, 2013.

Mümtaz Tahincioğlu (born 1952 in Mardin, Turkey) is a former racing car driver and long-time president of the Turkish Motorsports Federation (TOSFED), FIA Council Member, and served as the secretary general of the sports club Galatasaray S.K.

Tahincioğlu lived in England between 1968 and 1989. He won the Turkish Karting Championship thrice between 1989 and 1992 before racing in the World Karting Championships for Turkey. He competed in the first edition of the Turkish Formula Three Championship in 1994.

Tahincioglu was president of the Turkish Motorsports Federation (TOSFED) between 1997 and 2012, succeeded by Demir Berberoğlu. He is the father of Jason Tahincioglu, a former Formula Three pilot and GP2 FMS International driver in 2006 and 2007.
