= Thor Chuan Leong =

Malaysian snooker player

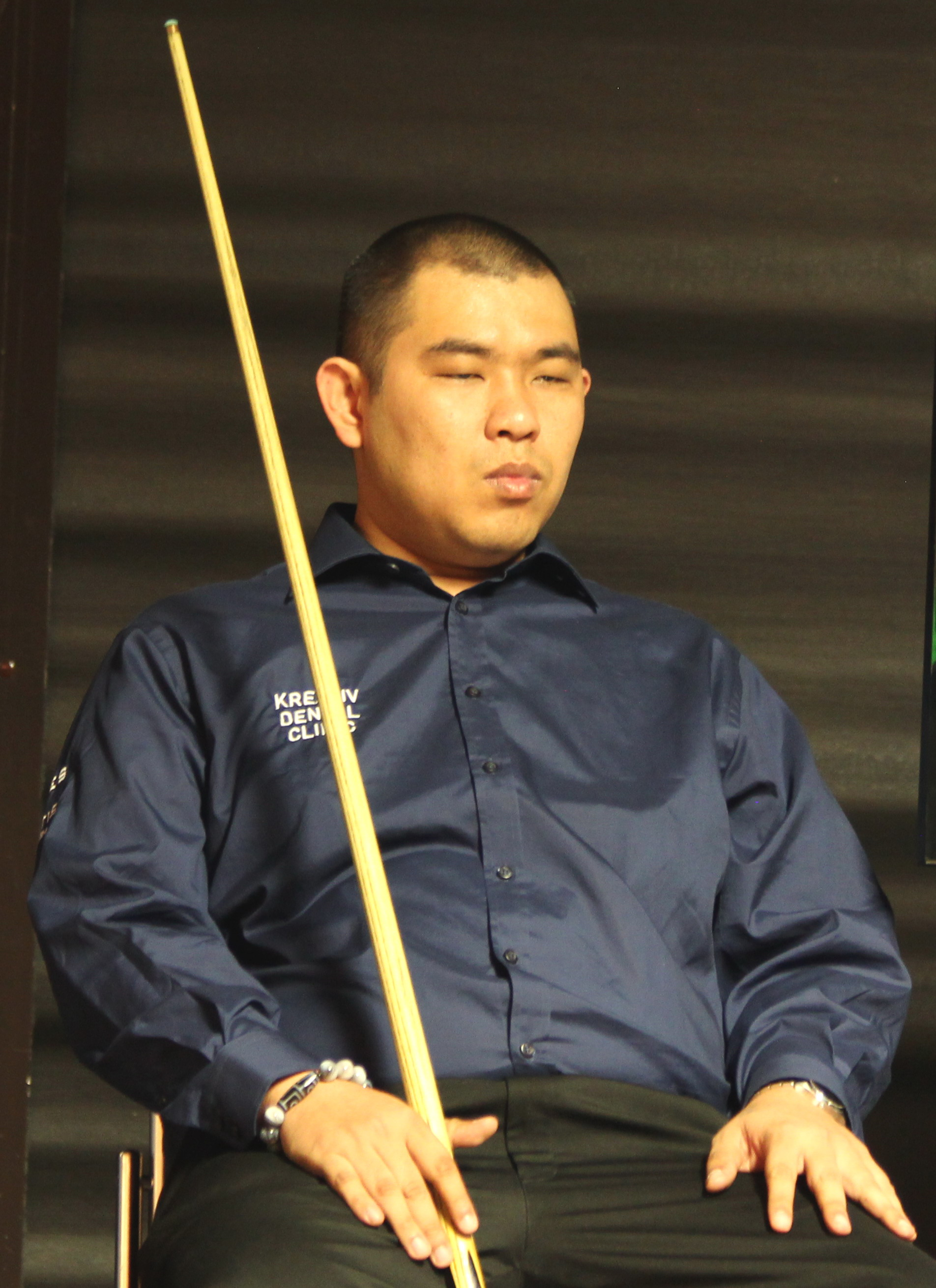
- Paul Hunter Classic 2015

Personal information
- Born: 24 March 1988 (age 38)

Sport
- Country: Malaysia
- Sport: Snooker
- Professional: 2014–2020, 2023–2025
- Highest ranking: 74 (September 2024)
- Best ranking finish: Last 16 (x2)
Medal record
Men's snooker
Representing Malaysia
Southeast Asian Games
Silver medal – second place	2007 Nakhon Ratchasima	Team
Silver medal – second place	2009 Vientiane	Singles
Silver medal – second place	2009 Vientiane	Doubles
Gold medal – first place	2011 Palembang	Doubles
Bronze medal – third place	2011 Palembang	Singles
Gold medal – first place	2013 Naypyidaw	6-red singles
Bronze medal – third place	2013 Naypyidaw	Singles
Bronze medal – third place	2013 Naypyidaw	6-red doubles
Gold medal – first place	2015 Singapore	Singles
Gold medal – first place	2015 Singapore	Doubles
Bronze medal – third place	2017 Kuala Lumpur	Doubles
Gold medal – first place	2023 Phnom Penh	Singles
Gold medal – first place	2025 Bangkok	6-red singles
Gold medal – first place	2025 Bangkok	6-red team
Bronze medal – third place	2025 Bangkok	SIngles
Bronze medal – third place	2025 Bangkok	Team

Thor Chuan Leong

Chinese name
- Traditional Chinese: 涂振龍
- Simplified Chinese: 涂振龙
- Hanyu Pinyin: Tú Zhènlóng
- Hokkien POJ: Thô͘ Chín-liông
- Tâi-lô: Thôo Tsín-liông

Thor Chuan Leong (simplified Chinese: 涂振龙; traditional Chinese: 涂振龍; pinyin: Tú Zhènlóng; Pe̍h-ōe-jī: Thô͘ Chín-liông; born 24 March 1988), better known on the main tour as Rory Thor, is a Malaysian former professional snooker player.

== Career ==
Thor, based in Penang, Malaysia represented his country at the 2006 & 2010 Asian Games and in the 2013 Asian Indoor and Martial Arts Games and 2013 Southeast Asian Games, in the Southeast Asian Games he won bronze in the snooker singles and doubles and gold in the six red snooker singles.

In 2014, Thor won the ACBS Asian Snooker Championship in May, beating Taiwan's Hung Chuang Ming 7–3 in the final. This victory gained Thor a two-year card on the professional World Snooker Tour for the 2014–15 and 2015/2016 seasons. However, despite the tour starting in May, Thor did not start playing on the tour until February 2015. He played in the Six-red World Championship, but lost all five of his group matches. In his first match in a ranking event qualifier he was beaten 1–4 by Dechawat Poomjaeng. Although Thor lost all four of his matches this season he did push top 16 player Stuart Bingham to a deciding frame in the first round of the Welsh Open.

Thor again failed to win a single match in ranking events during the 2015–16 season; in contrast, he performed successfully in the European Tour events, winning all of his first-round matches and reaching last 16 twice, at the Paul Hunter Classic and the Gdynia Open. As a result, Thor was able to secure his place on the Main Tour for two further seasons by finishing tied 31st on the Order of Merit.

A 5–2 victory over Jack Lisowski saw Thor qualify for the 2016 World Open and he reached the second round by beating Luca Brecel 5–3, before losing 1–5 to Neil Robertson. He also advanced to the last 32 of the Gibraltar Open with wins over Matthew Roberts and Gary Wilson, but lost 3–4 to Igor Figueiredo.

At the 2024 British Open he secured one of the highest profile wins of his career, defeating three-time world champion Mark Williams 4–1 in the first round.

== Performance and rankings timeline ==
Tournament	2014/ 15	2015/ 16	2016/ 17	2017/ 18	2018/ 19	2019/ 20	2023/ 24	2024/ 25
Ranking (Note: It shows the ranking at the beginning of the season)	(Note: New players on the Main Tour do not have a ranking)	125	(Note: Players qualified through European Tour Order of Merit started the season without prize money ranking points)	84	(Note: Players qualified through Q School started the season without ranking points)	83		84
Ranking tournaments
Championship League	Non-Ranking Event						WD	RR
Xi'an Grand Prix	Tournament Not Held							LQ
Saudi Arabia Masters	Tournament Not Held							4R
English Open	Not Held		1R	3R	2R	1R	LQ	LQ
British Open	Tournament Not Held						1R	3R
Wuhan Open	Tournament Not Held						LQ	LQ
Northern Ireland Open	Not Held		1R	1R	1R	1R	1R	1R
International Championship	A	LQ	LQ	LQ	LQ	LQ	LQ	LQ
UK Championship	A	1R	1R	1R	1R	1R	LQ	LQ
Shoot Out	Non-Ranking		1R	1R	2R	2R	1R	1R
Scottish Open	Not Held		1R	1R	1R	1R	3R	LQ
German Masters	A	LQ	LQ	LQ	LQ	LQ	LQ	LQ
Welsh Open	1R	1R	2R	1R	2R	1R	LQ	1R
World Open	Not Held		2R	LQ	LQ	LQ	LQ	LQ
World Grand Prix	NR	DNQ	DNQ	DNQ	DNQ	DNQ	DNQ	DNQ
Players Championship (Note: The event was called the Players Tour Championship Grand Final (2014/2015–2015/2016))	DNQ	DNQ	DNQ	DNQ	DNQ	DNQ	DNQ	DNQ
Tour Championship	Tournament Not Held				DNQ	DNQ	DNQ	DNQ
World Championship	LQ	LQ	LQ	LQ	LQ	LQ	LQ	LQ
Non-ranking tournaments
Championship League	A	A	A	A	A	RR	A	A
Former ranking tournaments
Shanghai Masters	A	LQ	LQ	LQ	Non-Ranking Event			
Paul Hunter Classic	Minor-Rank		1R	A	1R	NR	Not Held	
Indian Open	LQ	NH	LQ	LQ	1R	Not Held		
China Open	LQ	LQ	LQ	LQ	1R	Not Held		
Riga Masters (Note: The event was called the Riga Open (2014/2015–2015/2016))	Minor-Rank		LQ	LQ	WD	LQ	Not Held	
China Championship	Not Held		NR	LQ	LQ	LQ	Not Held	
Gibraltar Open	NH	MR	3R	2R	A	1R	Not Held	
European Masters	Not Held		LQ	1R	2R	LQ	LQ	NH
Former non-ranking tournaments
Six-red World Championship	RR	RR	A	A	A	A	Not Held	

Performance Table Legend
LQ	lost in the qualifying draw	#R	lost in the early rounds of the tournament (WR = Wildcard round, RR = Round robin)	QF	lost in the quarter-finals
SF	lost in the semi-finals	F	lost in the final	W	won the tournament
DNQ	did not qualify for the tournament	A	did not participate in the tournament	WD	withdrew from the tournament

NH / Not Held	means an event was not held.
NR / Non-Ranking Event	means an event is/was no longer a ranking event.
R / Ranking Event	means an event is/was a ranking event.
MR / Minor-Ranking Event	means an event is/was a minor-ranking event.

== Career finals ==
=== Pro-am finals: 5 (4 titles) ===
Outcome	No.	Year	Championship	Opponent in the final	Score
Runner-up	1.	2009	Southeast Asian Games	(Thailand) Supoj Saenla	3–4
Winner	1.	2013	Southeast Asian Games (six-red)	(Laos) Sithideth Sakbieng	5–4
Winner	2.	2015	Southeast Asian Games	(Myanmar) Htet Ko	4–2
Winner	3.	2023	Southeast Asian Games (2)	(Thailand) Sunny Akani	4–1
Winner	4.	2025	Southeast Asian Games (six-red) (2)	(Thailand) Danjirakul Poramin	5–2

=== Amateur finals: 2 (1 title) ===
Outcome	No.	Year	Championship	Opponent in the final	Score
Winner	1.	2014	ACBS Asian Snooker Championship	(Taiwan) Hung Chuang Ming	7–3
Runner-up	1.	2023	ACBS Asian Snooker Championship	(Iran) Amir Sarkhosh	1–5
