= Güzin Müjde Karakaşlı =

Turkish carom billiards player (born 1991)

Güzin Müjde Karakaşkı
Personal information
- Born: 22 June 1991 (age 35) Denizli, Turkey

Sport
- Sport: Carom billiards
- Event: Three-cushion billiards
- Club: Maltepe Arena
Medal record
Three-cushion billiards
Representing Turkey
World Championship
Bronze medal – third place	2017 Zoersel	Individual
European Championship
Bronze medal – third place	2015 Brandenburg/Havel	Individual
Silver medal – second place	2019 Brandenburg/Havel	Individual
Silver medal – second place	2023 Antalya	Team

Güzin Müjde Karakaşlı (born 22 June 1991) is a Turkish professional carom billiards player and lawyer.

== Sport career ==
=== Early years ===
She grew up playing volleyball for 11 to 12 years in the farm team of the local Denizlispor Club during her school years. In the final year of high school, she took a break from volleyball to prepare for university entrance exams. During this time, she started going to a billiard hall, where pool and three-cushion billiards were played in separate rooms. In the beginning, she played pool billiard with her friends. However, she became curious about three-cushion billiards, because she found it more creative. In 2009, at the age of 18, she switched over to playing three-cushion billiards. She has said that "her advanced knowledge of geometry helps her much in this branch". The manager of the billiard hall invited her to the Turkish Championships. There, she enjoyed playing the sport so much that she chose billiards over a volleyball career.

=== International career ===
In 2014, she debuted internationally at the UMB Women's World Three-cushion Championship held in Sinop, Turkey. In the same year, she won her first Grand Prix in Istanbul, Turkey. In 2015, at the CEB European Three-cushion Championship in Brandenburg an der Havel, Germany, she won the bronze medal. In that competition, Turkey was represented for the first time by two female billiard players. Next year, she again won a bronze medal at the European level. At the 2017 UMB Women's World Three-cushion Championship in Zoersel, Belgium, she took the bronze medal At the 2018 World Championship in İzmir, Turkey, she placed sixth. In 2019, she became the Turkish champion in women's three-cushion billiards. She won a silver medal at the 2019 CEB European Three-cushion Championship in Brandenburg an der Havel, Germany. In 2019, she won the first Turkish women's Grand Prix held in Manavgat, Antalya by defeating Gülşen Degener in the semi-final and Ayşegül Fendi in the final. In April 2023, she took part in the CEB European Three-cushion Championship held in Belek, Serik, Antalya, Turkey, as a member of the Turkish national team, and won a silver medal with her teammate Gülşen Degener. In the 2023 Predator Women’s Grand Prix in Valencia, Spain, she finished sixth out of eight competitors.

== Personal life ==
Güzin Müjde Karakaşlı was born in Denizli, Turkey on 22 June 1991 to a volleyballer family. Her father, mother and twin sister were all volleyball players.

After graduating from the Anatolian High School in Denizli, she studied law at Istanbul Bilgi University. Karakaşlı lives in Istanbul, and works as a lawyer and legal advisor.

She is a member of "Maltepe Arena" Club, and plays billiard 4 to 5 hours a day, 3 to 4 days a week, mostly with her male friends.

In billiard circles, she is known by her given name "Güzin", while her friends call her "Müjde".
