= Gülşen Degener =

Turkish carom billiards player (born 1968)

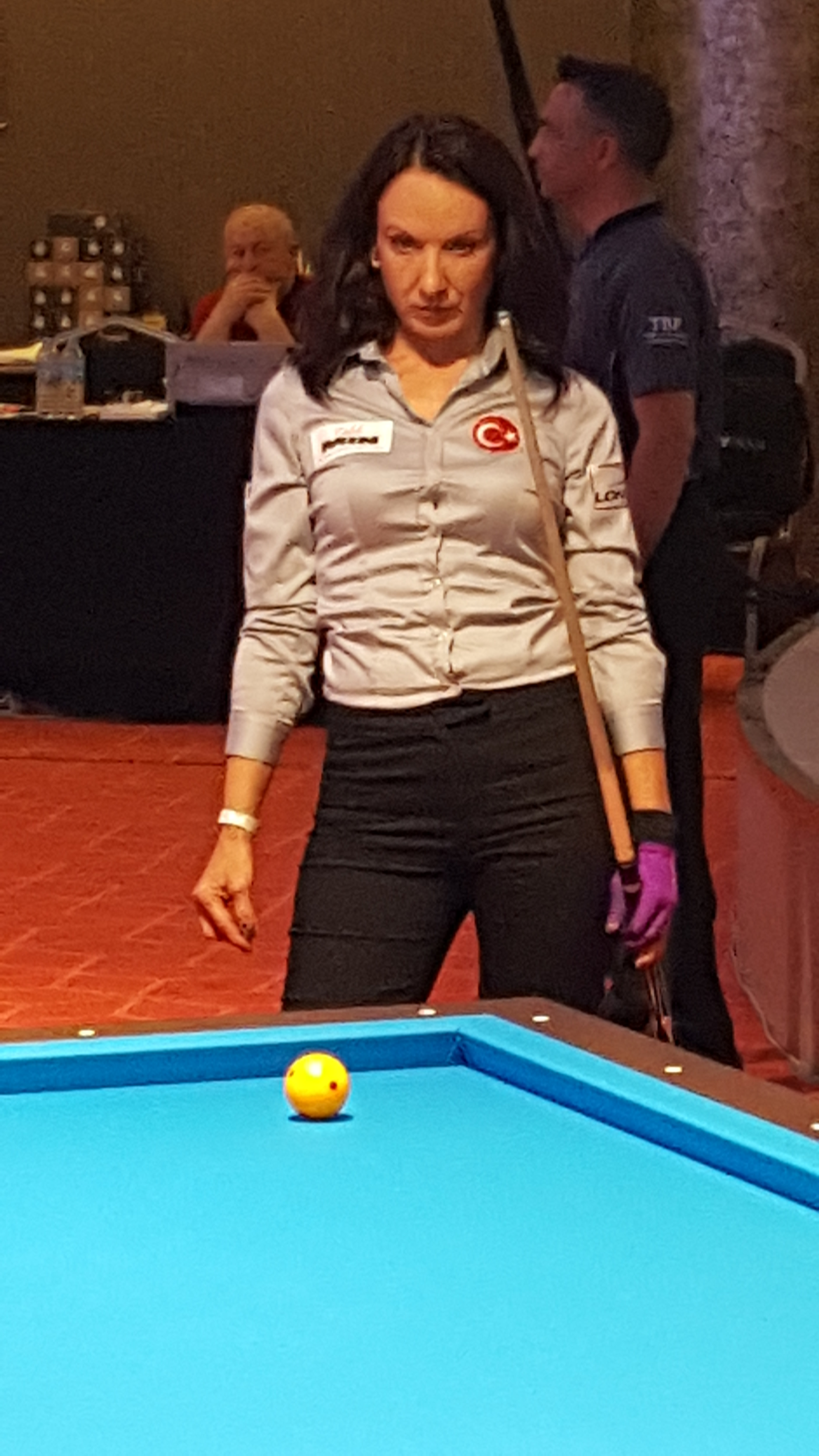
- Degener at the 3-Cushion World Cup in 2018

Personal information
- Nationality: Turkish
- Born: October 25, 1968 (age 57) Şanlıurfa, Turkey
- Website: www.gulsendegener.com

Sport
- Sport: Carom billiards
- Event: Three-cushion billiards
- Club: Billard Akademie Berlin

Gülşen Degener (born 25 October 1968, in Şanlıurfa) is a female Turkish-born, Germany-resident professional carom billiards player.

== Career ==
Gülşen Degener was born in Şanlıurfa, southeastern Turkey on October 25, 1968. She began playing billiards while she was at Uludağ University in Bursa, Turkey, studying English philology and literature. After graduation, she served four years in Istanbul and three years in Berlin, Germany as a teacher for English language. During her stay in the Netherlands, she played in the Dutch Billiards League. In the summer of 2013, she quit her profession as a teacher in Germany, which she had taken a break as she received an offer in the Netherlands to switch over to professional billiards player.

She has been playing billiards for 10 years, the last 4 years professionally. After mastering straight rail billiards, she switched over to three-cushion, a more difficult variety.

In the mid-1990s, Gülşen moved to Berlin, Germany. In 1999, she played for a leading Dutch first division ladies team, Tabara. In the 2002–2003 season, she played for the German second division team BSG Duisburg, before joining the Portuguese first division team Centro Norton de Matos for the 2005–2006 season.

In 2015, Degener won once again the Turkish champion title. She became runners-up at the 2015 CEB European Championships held in Brandenburg, Germany. She repeated her achievement as runners-up at the 2016 CEB European Women's Three-cushion Cup held in the Netherlands on June 17–19, 2016 after losing to the world champion Dutch Therese Klompenhouwer by 30-16 in the finals.

She was awarded the "Best Female Three-cushion Billiards Player 2016" by the Turkish Billiards Federation.

In April 2023, she took part at the CEB European Three-cushion Championship held at Belekşn Serik, Antalya, Turkey as part of the Turkish national team, and won the silver medal with her team mate Güzin Müjde Karakaşlı.

Degener currently resides in Germany and is married and has a child.

== Achievements ==
Year	Competition	Achievement
1999	German Women’s Championship	Champion
2000	German Women’s Championship	Runners-up
2001	German Women’s Championship	Champion
2001	Berlin and Brandenburg Region, German 3rd Division League	Champion and upgrade to the German 2nd Division
2001/2002:	Dutch league	Champion
2002	German Women’s Championship	Champion
2002	European Women’s Cup, Belgium	Champion
2002	Tournament in Bergisch Gladbach, Germany	upgrade to the German 1st Division
2002	Ladies World Challenge Cup, Gandia, Spain	3rd place with the Turkish team
2002/2003	Dutch league	Runners-up
2002/2003	European women’s leagues	Best scorer
2003	European Women’s Cup, the Netherlands	Champion
2003/2004	German Grand Prix – qualification	the only woman for the German Championship
2003/2004	European women’s leagues	Best scorer
2004	European Women’s Cup, Germany	Champion
2004	World Women’s Championship 3-Cushion, Valencia, Spain	9th place
2004/2005	European women’s leagues	Best scorer
2005	Turkish national team qualifications, Ankara	1st place
2005	European Women’s Championship 3-Cushion, Manisa, Turkey	3rd place
2015	Turkish Three-cushion Championships, Erzincan	Champion
2015	CEB European Championships, Germany	Runners-up
2016	CEB European Women's Three-cushion Cup, Netherlands	Runners-up
2023	CEB European Women's Three-cushion Championship, Turkey	Runners-up Team

== Records ==
Highest series for women

- 10 – 2004 Dutch league

Highest game average for women

- 1.400 – 2004 Dutch league
- 1.500 – 2005 European Women’s Championship 3-Cushion, Manisa, Turkey
