= List of Burmese records in swimming =

The Burmese records in swimming are the fastest ever performances of swimmers from Myanmar, which are recognised and ratified by the Myanmar Swimming Federation.

All records were set in finals unless noted otherwise.

== Long Course (50 m) ==
=== Men ===
Event	Time		Name	Club	Date	Meet	Location	Ref
50 m freestyle	22.62	h	Win Htet Oo	Myanmar	9 December 2019	Southeast Asian Games	New Clark City, Philippines	
100 m freestyle	50.18		Win Htet Oo	Myanmar	8 December 2019	Southeast Asian Games	New Clark City, Philippines	
200 m freestyle	1:59.43		Phone Pyae Han	Gess Swim Team	21 March 2025	55th Singapore National Age Group Swimming Championships	Singapore, Singapore	
400 m freestyle	4:16.34		Phone Pyae Han	Gess Swim Team	20 March 2025	55th Singapore National Age Group Swimming Championships	Singapore, Singapore	
800 m freestyle	8:59.60		Phone Pyae Han	Gess Swim Team	18 March 2025	55th Singapore National Age Group Swimming Championships	Singapore, Singapore	
1500 m freestyle	17:19.30		Maung Maung Sein	Myanmar	1989	-	Yangon, Myanmar	
50 m backstroke	28.88		Thint Myat	Myanmar	2 June 2018	-	Yangon, Myanmar	
100 m backstroke	1:02.94		Thint Myat	Myanmar	3 June 2018	-	Yangon, Myanmar	
200 m backstroke	2:16.90		Sein Win Ryan	Myanmar	26 July 2017	-	Los Angeles, United States	
50 m breaststroke	30.22		Ye Mint Hane	Myanmar	20 December 2014	-	Palembang, Indonesia	
100 m breaststroke	1:06.82		Sein Win Ryan	Myanmar	2 August 2017	-	Los Angeles, United States	
200 m breaststroke	2:23.41		Sein Win Ryan	Myanmar	4 August 2017	-	Los Angeles, United States	
50m butterfly	26.23		Thiha Aung	Myanmar	4 November 2018	-	Yangon, Myanmar	
100m butterfly	59.34		Thiha Aung	Myanmar	25 September 2016	-	Yangon, Myanmar	
200m butterfly	2:14.06		Thiha Aung	Myanmar	4 April 2016	-	Bangkok, Thailand	
200m individual medley	2:10.92		Sein Win Ryan	Myanmar	5 August 2017	-	Los Angeles, United States	
400m individual medley	4:40.48		Sein Win Ryan	Myanmar	2 August 2017	-	Los Angeles, United States	
4 × 100m freestyle relay	3:40.94		Win Htet Oo (52.96); Min Thu Kha (56.43); Thiha Aung (57.27); Ye Myint Hane (54.28)	Myanmar	14 December 2013	Southeast Asian Games	Naypyitaw, Myanmar	
4 × 200m freestyle relay	8:17.44		Ye Myint Hein (2:01.75); Min Thu Kha (2:04.21); Myat Thu Oo (2:10.04); Win Htet Oo (2:01.34)	Myanmar	12 December 2013	Southeast Asian Games	Naypyitaw, Myanmar	
4 × 100m medley relay	4:08.34		Aung Myo Oo (1:04.37); Ye Myint Hane (1:07.13); Thiha Aung (1:02.81); Win Htet Oo (54.03)	Myanmar	16 December 2013	Southeast Asian Games	Naypyitaw, Myanmar	

Legend: # – Record awaiting ratification by Myanmar Swimming Federation; WR – World record; AS – Asian record;
Records not set in finals: h – heat; sf – semifinal; r – relay 1st leg; rh – relay heat 1st leg; b – B final; † – en route to final mark; so – swim-off; tt – time trial

=== Women ===
Event	Time		Name	Club	Date	Meet	Location	Ref
50m freestyle	26.34		Aung Moe Thu	Myanmar	2001	Southeast Asian Games	Kuala Lumpur, Malaysia	
100m freestyle	57.75		Aung Moe Thu	Myanmar	2001	Southeast Asian Games	Kuala Lumpur, Malaysia	
200m freestyle	2:05.43		Aung Moe Thu	-	2005			
400m freestyle	4:35.42		Aung Moe Thu	Myanmar	1997	-		
800m freestyle	9:32.06		Aung Moe Thu	Myanmar	1997	-		
1500m freestyle								
50m backstroke	30.88	h	Oo Nan Honey	Myanmar	11 December 2025	Southeast Asian Games	Bangkok, Thailand	
100m backstroke	1:07.58		Aung Moe Thu	-	2004			
200m backstroke	2:28.65		Aung Moe Thu	Myanmar	2004	-		
50m breaststroke	36.17		Su Moe Theint San	Myanmar	2015	-		
100m breaststroke	1:15.25		Aung Moe Thu	-	2000			
200m breaststroke	2:48.54		Aung Moe Thu	-	1999			
50m butterfly	29.05		Oo Nan Honey	Myanmar	15 December 2025	Southeast Asian Games	Bangkok, Thailand	
100m butterfly	1:00.87		Aung Moe Thu	Myanmar	2005	Southeast Asian Games	Hanoi, Vietnam	
200m butterfly	2:20.33		Aung Moe Thu	Myanmar	1997	-		
200m individual medley	2:25.43		Aung Moe Thu	Myanmar	2001	Southeast Asian Games	Kuala Lumpur, Malaysia	
400m individual medley	5:11.67		Aung Moe Thu	Myanmar	2004	-		
4 × 100 m freestyle relay	4:18.98		Su Moe Theint San (1:03.80); Ei Ei Thet (1:03.89); Khant Khant Su San (1:06.88); K Zin Win (1:04.41)	Myanmar	2013	Southeast Asian Games	Naypyidaw, Myanmar	
4 × 200 m freestyle relay	9:23.54		Khant Khant Su San (2:19.37); Su Moe Theint San (2:19.32); K Zin Win (2:21.19); Ei Ei Thet (2:22.94)	Myanmar	12 December 2013	Southeast Asian Games	Naypyidaw, Myanmar	
4 × 100 m medley relay	4:50.05		Thiri Nandar (1:15.32); Ei Ei Thet (1:20.99); Su Moe Theint San (1:08.68); K Zin Win (1:05.06)	Myanmar	15 December 2013	Southeast Asian Games	Naypyidaw, Myanmar	

Legend: # – Record awaiting ratification by Myanmar Swimming Federation; WR – World record; AS – Asian record;
Records not set in finals: h – heat; sf – semifinal; r – relay 1st leg; rh – relay heat 1st leg; b – B final; † – en route to final mark; so – swim-off; tt – time trial

=== Mixed relay ===
Event	Time	Name	Club	Date	Meet	Location	Ref
4×100 m freestyle relay							
4×100 m medley relay							

Legend: # – Record awaiting ratification by Myanmar Swimming Federation;
Records not set in finals: h – heat; so – swim-off

== Short Course (25 m) ==
=== Men ===
Event	Time		Name	Club	Date	Meet	Location	Ref
50 m freestyle	22.07		Win Htet Oo	Western Melbourne Propulsion	26 November 2019	Australian Championships	Melbourne, Australia	
100 m freestyle	49.46	r	Win Htet Oo	Western Melbourne Propulsion	24 November 2019	Australian Championships	Melbourne, Australia	
200 m freestyle	1:55.29		Phone Pyae Han	Gess Swim Team	16 November 2024	ACSIS HS MEET	Singapore, Singapore	
400 m freestyle	4:08.14	h	Phone Pyae Han	Myanmar	31 October 2024	World Cup	Singapore, Singapore	
800 m freestyle	8:38.59		Phone Pyae Han	Gess Wildcats	8 November 2025	11th Singapore National Championships	Singapore, Singapore	
1500 m freestyle	17:17.98		Phone Pyae Han	Gess Swim Team	25 November 2023	10th Singapore National Championships	Singapore, Singapore	
50 m backstroke	27.88		Lin Bhone Myat	Bangkok Elite Swim Team	15 August 2026	Thailand Age Group Championships	Bangkok, Thailand	
100 m backstroke	1:05.20	h	Paing Htoo Han	SwimDolphia Aquatic School	29 August 2026	Singapore National Invitational	Singapore, Singapore	
100 m backstroke	1:00.01	#	Lin Bhone Myat	Aqua King Myanmar	18 October 2025	37th Aqua King Swim Trials	Yangon, Myanmar	
200 m backstroke	2:29.68	h	Ahnt Khaung Htut	Myanmar	7 December 2014	World Championships	Doha, Qatar	
200 m backstroke	2:21.16	#	Lin Bhone Myat	Aqua King Myanmar	18 October 2025	37th Aqua King Swim Trials	Yangon, Myanmar	
50 m breaststroke	31.16		Lin Myat Thu	Aqua King Myanmar	18 August 2024	Asian Open School Invitational	Bangkok, Thailand	
50 m breaststroke	30.82	#	Ahnt Khaung Htut	Aqua King Myanmar	1 June 2022	Aqua King Time Trial	Yangon, Myanmar	
100 m breaststroke	1:08.18		Lin Myat Thu	Aqua King Myanmar	17 August 2024	Asian Open School Invitational	Bangkok, Thailand	
100 m breaststroke	1:07.73	#	Ahnt Khaung Htut	Aqua King Myanmar	1 June 2022	Aqua King Time Trial	Yangon, Myanmar	
200 m breaststroke	2:26.50		Lin Myat Thu	Aqua King Myanmar	17 August 2024	Asian Open School Invitational	Bangkok, Thailand	
50 m butterfly	26.98		Lin Myat Thu	Aqua King Myanmar	18 August 2024	Asian Open School Invitational	Bangkok, Thailand	
50 m butterfly	26.09	#	Phone Min Khant	Aqua King Myanmar	7 February 2026	38th Aqua King Swim Trials	Yangon, Myanmar	
100 m butterfly	1:01.06		Phone Pyae Han	Gess Swim Team	16 November 2024	ACSIS HS MEET	Singapore, Singapore	
200 m butterfly	2:19.37	h	Paing Htoo Han	SwimDolphia Aquatic School	8 November 2025	11th Singapore National Championships	Singapore, Singapore	
100 m individual medley	1:02.45	h	Lin Myat Thu	Aqua King Myanmar	18 August 2024	Asian Open School Invitational	Bangkok, Thailand	
100 m individual medley	1:01.33	#	Phone Min Khant	Aqua King Myanmar	8 February 2026	38th Aqua King Swim Trials	Yangon, Myanmar	
200 m individual medley	2:19.54		Lin Myat Thu	Aqua King Myanmar	17 August 2024	Asian Open School Invitational	Bangkok, Thailand	
400 m individual medley	5:01.31		Paing Htoo Han	SwimDolphia Aquatic School	8 November 2025	11th Singapore National Championships	Singapore, Singapore	
4×50 m freestyle relay	1:45.56	h	Phone Min Khant (25.72); Han Min Zaw (26.61); Thant San (26.41); Phone Min Myat (26.82)	Aqua King Myanmar	29 August 2026	AOSI Championships	Bangkok, Thailand	
4 × 100 m freestyle relay								
4 × 200 m freestyle relay								
4×50 m medley relay								
4 × 100 m medley relay								

Legend: # – Record awaiting ratification by Myanmar Swimming Federation; WR – World record; AS – Asian record;
Records not set in finals: h – heat; sf – semifinal; r – relay 1st leg; rh – relay heat 1st leg; b – B final; † – en route to final mark; so – swim-off; tt – time trial

=== Women ===
Event	Time		Name	Club	Date	Meet	Location	Ref
50 m freestyle	28.10	h	Su Moe Theint San	Myanmar	6 December 2014	World Championships	Doha, Qatar	
100 m freestyle	1:02.56	h	Thet Ei Ei	Myanmar	13 December 2012	World Championships	Istanbul, Turkey	
200 m freestyle	2:15.13	h	Khant Khant Su San	Myanmar	7 December 2014	World Championships	Doha, Qatar	
400 m freestyle	4:43.19	h	Khant Khant Su San	Myanmar	5 December 2014	World Championships	Doha, Qatar	
800 m freestyle	9:51.98		Khant Khant Su San	Myanmar	4 December 2014	World Championships	Doha, Qatar	
1500 m freestyle								
50 m backstroke	33.20	h	Win K. Zin	Myanmar	15 December 2012	World Championships	Istanbul, Turkey	
50 m backstroke	33.13	#	Hsu Myat Hnin	Aqua King Myanmar	27 September 2026	41st Aqua King Time Trials	Yangon, Myanmar	
100 m backstroke	1:12.01	h	Win K. Zin	Myanmar	12 December 2012	World Championships	Istanbul, Turkey	
200 m backstroke								
50m breaststroke	35.55	h	Su Moe Theint San	Myanmar	3 December 2014	World Championships	Doha, Qatar	
100m breaststroke	1:18.63	h	Su Moe Theint San	Myanmar	5 December 2014	World Championships	Doha, Qatar	
200m breaststroke	2:51.56	h	Su Moe Theint San	Myanmar	7 December 2014	World Championships	Doha, Qatar	
50m butterfly	29.45	h	Su Moe Theint San	Myanmar	4 December 2014	World Championships	Doha, Qatar	
100m butterfly	1:06.96	h	Su Moe Theint San	Myanmar	6 December 2014	World Championships	Doha, Qatar	
200m butterfly	2:31.65	h	Khant Khant Su San	Myanmar	3 December 2014	World Championships	Doha, Qatar	
100m individual medley	1:09.01	h	Su Moe Theint San	Myanmar	4 December 2014	World Championships	Doha, Qatar	
200 m individual medley								
400 m individual medley								
4×50 m freestyle relay	2:06.28	h	Phyo Thet Thakhin Aung (29.46); Ngwe La Thandar (34.17); Nyan Phyu Htet (32.66); Hsu Myat Hnin (29.99)	Aqua King Myanmar	29 August 2026	AOSI Championships	Bangkok, Thailand	
4 × 100 m freestyle relay								
4 × 200 m freestyle relay								
4×50 m medley relay								
4 × 100 m medley relay								

Legend: # – Record awaiting ratification by Myanmar Swimming Federation; WR – World record; AS – Asian record;
Records not set in finals: h – heat; sf – semifinal; r – relay 1st leg; rh – relay heat 1st leg; b – B final; † – en route to final mark; so – swim-off; tt – time trial

=== Mixed relay ===
Event	Time		Name	Club	Date	Meet	Location	Ref
4×50 m freestyle relay	1:42.90	h	Thant San (27.09); Hsu Myat Hnin (30.10); Phyo Thet Thakhin Aung (29.45); Phone Min Khant (26.47)	Aqua King Myanmar	30 August 2026	AOSI Championships	Bangkok, Thailand	
4×50 m medley relay								

Legend: # – Record awaiting ratification by Myanmar Swimming Federation;
Records not set in finals: h – heat; so – swim-off
