= 2022 Lion City Sailors FC season =

Lion City Sailors
2022 season
- Owner: Sea Limited
- Chairman: Forrest Li
- Head coach: Kim Do-hoon (until 11 August); Luka Lalic (from 11 August)
- Stadium: Bishan Stadium; Jalan Besar Stadium (Temporary)
- Singapore Premier League: 2nd
- AFC Champions League: Group Stage (3rd)
- Singapore Cup: Group Stage (3rd)
- Top goalscorer: League: Kim Shin-wook (21); All: Kim Shin-wook (24)
Home colours	Away colours

The 2022 season was Lion City Sailors' 27th consecutive season in the Singapore Premier League and the third season since privatising from Home United. They played in the 2022 AFC Champions League, which marked their third appearance at the competition (including main play-offs), and their first ACL Group Stage appearance.

== Squad ==
=== Singapore Premier League ===
As of 1 October 2022

Squad No.	Name	Nationality	Date of birth (age)	Previous club	Contract since	Contract end
Goalkeepers
1	Izwan Mahbud ^{O30}	(Singapore)	14 July 1990 (age 36)	(Singapore) Hougang United	2022	2023
13	Adib Hakim	(Singapore)	9 March 1998 (age 28)	(Singapore) Young Lions	2020	2022
18	Hassan Sunny ^{O30}	(Singapore)	2 April 1984 (age 42)	(Thailand) Army United	2020	2022
Defenders
2	Pedro Henrique	(Brazil)	18 December 1992 (age 33)	(Brazil) Atlético Goianiense	2022	2024
4	Zulqarnaen Suzliman	(Singapore)	29 March 1998 (age 28)	(Singapore) Young Lions	2020	2022
5	Amirul Adli	(Singapore)	13 January 1996 (age 30)	(Singapore) Tampines Rovers	2021	2022
11	Hafiz Nor ^{O30}	(Singapore)	22 August 1988 (age 38)	(Singapore) Warriors FC	2018	2022
12	Iqram Rifqi	(Singapore)	25 February 1996 (age 30)	(Singapore) Geylang International	2017	2022
14	Hariss Harun (C) ^{O30}	(Singapore)	9 November 1990 (age 35)	(Malaysia) Johor Darul Ta'zim	2021	2024
19	Naqiuddin Eunos	(Singapore)	1 December 1997 (age 28)	(Singapore) Young Lions	2020	2022
Midfielders
6	Anumanthan Kumar	(Singapore)	14 July 1994 (age 32)	(Malaysia) Kedah Darul Aman	2022	2024
7	Song Ui-young	(Singapore)	8 November 1993 (age 32)	(Singapore) LCS Academy	2012	2022
8	Shahdan Sulaiman ^{O30}	(Singapore)	9 May 1988 (age 38)	(Singapore) Tampines Rovers	2020	2022
10	Diego Lopes	(Brazil)	3 May 1994 (age 32)	(Portugal) Rio Ave	2021	2023
16	Hami Syahin	(Singapore)	16 December 1998 (age 27)	(Singapore) Young Lions	2019	2022
17	Maxime Lestienne	(Belgium)	17 June 1992 (age 34)	(Belgium) Standard Liege	2022	2023
20	Arshad Shamim ^{U23}	(Singapore)	9 December 1999 (age 26)	(Singapore) Young Lions FC	2018	2022
27	Adam Swandi	(Singapore)	12 January 1996 (age 30)	(Singapore) Albirex Niigata (S)	2019	2022
28	Saifullah Akbar ^{U23}	(Singapore)	31 January 1999 (age 27)	(Singapore) Young Lions	2020	2022
Strikers
9	Kim Shin-wook	(South Korea)	14 April 1988 (age 38)	(China) Shanghai Shenhua	2022	2024
22	Gabriel Quak ^{O30}	(Singapore)	22 December 1990 (age 35)	(Singapore) Warriors FC	2020	2022
23	Amiruldin Asraf	(Singapore)	8 January 1997 (age 29)	(Singapore) LCS Academy	2017	2022
25	Haiqal Pashia	(Singapore)	29 November 1998 (age 27)	(Singapore) Young Lions	2021	2022
30	Faris Ramli	(Singapore)	24 August 1992 (age 34)	(Malaysia) Terengganu FC	2021	2022
Players who are either on National Service or left the squad mid-season
62	Veer Karan Sobti ^{U21}	(Singapore)	6 May 2004 (age 22)	(Singapore) Young Lions	2021	2025
3	Tajeli Salamat	(Singapore)	7 February 1994 (age 32)	(Singapore) Warriors FC	2020	2022
16	Justin Hui	(Singapore)	17 February 1998 (age 28)	(Singapore) Hougang United	2021	2021
24	Rudy Khairullah	(Singapore)	19 July 1994 (age 32)	(Singapore) Police SA (NFL D1)	2017	2022

=== Mattar Sailors (SFL1) squad ===
Squad No.	Name	Nationality	Date of birth (age)	Previous club	Contract since	Contract end
Goalkeepers
1	Nicolas Geeraerts ^{U21}	(Belgium)		(Singapore) Lion City Sailors U21	2022	2022
15	Travis Ang ^{U21}	(Singapore)	23 October 2004 (age 21)	(Singapore) Lion City Sailors U21	2022	2022
18	Firman Nabil ^{U21}	(Singapore)	27 March 2005 (age 21)	(Singapore) Lion City Sailors U21	2022	2022
Defenders
5	Farid Jafri ^{U21}	(Singapore)	5 January 2004 (age 22)	(Singapore) Lion City Sailors U21	2022	2022
12	Rayyan Ramzdan ^{U21}	(Singapore)	27 July 2004 (age 22)	(Singapore) Lion City Sailors U21	2022	2022
23	Aqil M. Khusni ^{U21}	(Singapore)		(Singapore) Lion City Sailors U21	2022	2022
32	Danial Azman ^{U21}	(Singapore)	15 January 2001 (age 25)	(Singapore) Lion City Sailors U21	2022	2022
47	Marcus Mosses ^{U21}	(Singapore)	21 January 2005 (age 21)	(Singapore) Lion City Sailors U21	2022	2022
	Lutfi Hadi ^{U21}	(Singapore)		(Singapore) Lion City Sailors U21	2022	2022
	Daniel Elfian ^{U21}	(Singapore)		(Singapore) Lion City Sailors U21	2022	2022
Midfielders
7	Danie Hafiy ^{U21}	(Singapore)	6 April 2004 (age 22)	(Singapore) Lion City Sailors U21	2022	2022
9	Arsyad Basiron ^{U21}	(Singapore)	10 March 2004 (age 22)	(Singapore) Lion City Sailors U21	2022	2022
10	Asis Ijilral ^{U21}	(Singapore)	4 March 2004 (age 22)	(Singapore) Lion City Sailors U21	2022	2022
11	Izafil Yusof ^{U21}	(Singapore)	27 January 2004 (age 22)	(Singapore) Lion City Sailors U21	2022	2022
14	Aloysius Pang ^{U21}	(Singapore)		(Singapore) Lion City Sailors U21	2022	2022
19	Aiqel Aliman ^{U21}	(Singapore)		(Singapore) Lion City Sailors U21	2022	2022
21	Rian Haziq Rosley ^{U21}	(Singapore)		(Singapore) Lion City Sailors U21	2022	2022
22	Aqil Khusni ^{U21}	(Singapore)		(Singapore) Lion City Sailors U21	2022	2022
29	Jonan Tan ^{U21}	(Singapore)	27 June 2006 (age 20)	(Singapore) Lion City Sailors U21	2022	2022
36	Febryan Pradana ^{U21}	(Singapore) (Indonesia)		(Singapore) Lion City Sailors U21	2022	2022
37	Rizqin Aniq ^{U21}	(Singapore)		(Singapore) Lion City Sailors U21	2022	2022
48	Uvayn Kumar ^{U21}	(Singapore)	25 May 2005 (age 21)	(Singapore) Lion City Sailors U21	2022	2022
51	Yasir Nizamudin ^{U21}	(Singapore)	21 January 2005 (age 21)	(Singapore) Lion City Sailors U21	2022	2022
92	Nuno Pereira	(Portugal)			2022	2022
Strikers
17	Fakis Aqasha ^{U21}	(Singapore)		(Singapore) Lion City Sailors U21	2022	2022
24	Qaisy Noranzor ^{U21}	(Singapore)	24 January 2006 (age 20)	(Singapore) Lion City Sailors U21	2022	2022

=== Women squad (LCS) ===
Squad No.	Name	Nationality	Date of birth (age)	Previous club	Contract since	Contract end
Goalkeeper
1	Noor Kusumawati	(Singapore)	29 September 1990 (age 35)	(Singapore) Warriors FC	2022	2022
22	Beatrice Tan Li Bin	(Singapore)	29 June 1992 (age 34)	(Singapore) Tanjong Pagar United	2022	2022
Defender
3	Fatin Aqillah	(Singapore)	11 June 1994 (age 32)	(Singapore) Tanjong Pagar United	2022	2022
4	Nur Umairah Hamdan	(Singapore)	11 March 2002 (age 24)	(Singapore) South Avenue CSC	2022	2022
8	Nur Syazwani Ruzi	(Singapore)	6 March 2001 (age 25)	(Singapore) Still Aerion FC	2022	2022
17	Khairunnisa Anwar	(Singapore)	21 February 2003 (age 23)	(Singapore) South Avenue CSC	2022	2022
18	Munirah Mohamad	(Singapore)			2022	2022
Midfielder
2	Madison Josephine Telmer	(Canada)	29 October 2004 (age 21)	ANZA Singapore	2022	2022
7	Sara Merican	(Singapore)	19 April 1996 (age 30)	(Singapore) Still Aerion FC	2022	2022
10	Nur Izzati Rosni	(Singapore)	24 May 1999 (age 27)	(Singapore) Still Aerion FC	2022	2022
13	Ernie Sulastri	(Singapore)	24 November 1988 (age 37)	(Singapore) Home United	2022	2022
16	Ho Huixin	(Singapore)	23 April 1992 (age 34)	(Singapore) Home United	2022	2022
19	Julia-Vanessa Farr	(Germany)	12 August 1991 (age 35)	(Singapore) Warriors FC	2022	2022
20	Dorcas Chu	(Singapore)	29 July 2002 (age 24)	(Singapore) Warriors FC	2022	2022
23	Venetia Lim Ying Xuan	(Singapore)	14 October 2003 (age 22)	(Singapore) Still Aerion FC	2022	2022
Forwards
5	Miray Hokotate Altun	(Japan)	6 April 2005 (age 21)	ANZA Singapore	2022	2022
9	Nur Syafina Putri Rashid	(Singapore)	9 August 2004 (age 22)	(Singapore) ITE College Central	2022	2022
14	Nicole Lim Yan Xiu	(Singapore)	10 April 2002 (age 24)	(Scotland) University of Edinburgh	2022	2022
12	Paula Druschke	(Germany)			2022	2022
25	Lila Tan Hui Ying	(Singapore) (France)	4 June 2003 (age 23)	(China) Aksil Shanghai	2022	2022
Mid-season transferred players
15	Danelle Tan	(Singapore)	25 October 2004 (age 21)	(England) Mill Hill School	2022	2022
24	Summer Chong	(Singapore)	18 December 2004 (age 21)	(United States) Black Rock FC	2022	2022

=== Women squad (Mattar Sailors) ===
Squad No.	Name	Nationality	Date of birth (age)	Previous club	Contract since	Contract end
Goalkeeper
	Izairida Shakira	(Singapore)	2 June 2007 (age 19)	(Singapore)	2022	2022
Defender
2	Shaniz Qistina	(Singapore)	6 June 2003 (age 23)	(Singapore)	2022	2022
3	Yasmin Namira	(Singapore)		(Singapore)	2022	2022
5	Maya	(Denmark)		(Singapore)	2022	2022
6	Seri Ayu Natasha Naszri	(Singapore)	19 December 2007 (age 18)	(Singapore)	2022	2022
12	Isis Ang	(Singapore)	10 January 2003 (age 23)	(Singapore)	2022	2022
15	Tia Foong Po Shiun	(Singapore)	31 July 2007 (age 19)	(Singapore)	2022	2022
16	Tasha Foong Po Yui	(Singapore)	27 May 2005 (age 21)	(Singapore)	2022	2022
Midfielder
8	Giselle Blumke			(Singapore)	2022	2022
10	Chloe Koh Ke Ying	(Singapore)	18 February 2007 (age 19)	(Singapore)	2022	2022
11	Ardhra Arul Ganeswaran	(Singapore)	25 July 2007 (age 19)	(Singapore)	2022	2022
20	Ain	(Singapore)		(Singapore)	2022	2022
	Aaniya Ahuja	(Singapore)	30 December 2005 (age 20)	(Singapore)	2022	2022
	Cara Ming-Yan Chang	(Singapore)	28 November 2008 (age 17)		2022	2022
	Madelin Sophie Lock	(Singapore)	24 May 2007 (age 19)		2022	2022
Forward
7	Charlotte Chong	(Singapore)	3 January 2007 (age 19)	(Singapore)	2022	2022
9	Josephine Ang Kaile	(Singapore)	26 September 2006 (age 19)	(Singapore)	2022	2022
13	Zalikha Haidah Abdul Rahman	(Singapore)	15 September 2004 (age 22)	(Singapore)	2022	2022
21	Nurul Ariqah	(Singapore)	25 April 2005 (age 21)	(Singapore)	2022	2022

== Coaching staff ==
The following list displays the coaching staff of all the Lion City Sailors current football sections:

Position	Name
Chairman	(Singapore) (China) Forrest Li
CEO	(Singapore) Chew Chun Liang
General Manager	(Singapore) Badri Ghent
Team Manager	(Vietnam) Hương Trần
Head Coach	(Serbia) Luka Lalić (Interim)
Head Coach (Women)	(Singapore) Yeong Sheau Shyan
Head Coach (SFL)	(Singapore) Jaslee Hatta
Assistant Coach	(Singapore) Noh Rahman
Goalkeeping Coach	(Singapore) Chua Lye Heng
Goalkeeper Coach (Under-21)	(Singapore) Yeo Jun Guang
Goalkeeping Coach (Under-13 to 17)	(Slovenia) Kris Stergulc
Goalkeeping Coach (Under-9 to 11)	(Singapore) Shahril Jantan
Head of Youth Team	(Singapore)
Under-21 Head Coach	(Singapore) Robin Chitrakar
Under-21 Coach	(Singapore) Winston Yap
Under-15 Head Coach	(Netherlands) Daan van Oudheusden
Under-13 Head Coach	(Scotland) Mustafa Al-Saffar
Under-12 Head Coach	(Singapore) Ashraf Ariffin
Under-11 Head Coach	(Germany) Vinzenz Loistl
Under-10 Head Coach	(Singapore) Masrezwan Masturi
Development Center Head Coach	(Spain) Rafael Palacios
Academy Director	(Serbia) Luka Lalić
Academy Assistant Coach	(Singapore) Sevki Sha'ban
Academy Technical Coach	(Portugal) Rodrigo Costa (Portugal) Nuno Pereira
Video Analyst	(Singapore) Adi Saleh
Academy Video Analyst	(Singapore) Gaelan Poh
Sports Trainer	(Singapore) Daniel Feriza (Singapore) Fazly Hasan
Head of Performance	(Croatia) Mario Jovanovic
Head of Performance (Academy)	(Netherlands) Mark Onderwater
Sports Performance Coach	(Singapore) Shazaly Ayob (Singapore) Nasruldin Baharuddin
Head Physiotherapist	(Singapore) Nurhafizah Abu Sujad
Head Physiotherapist (Academy)	(Netherlands) Mike Kerklaan
Physiologist	(Malaysia) Firdaus Maasar
Sports Therapist	(Singapore) Fathul Nur Hakim
Logistics Officer	(Singapore) Zahir Taufeek

== Transfers ==
=== In ===
Pre-season

Position	Player	Transferred from	Ref
DF	(Singapore) Zulqarnaen Suzliman	(Singapore) Police SA (Note: Return to club upon completion of his NS in May 2022)	End of National Service
MF	(Singapore) Hami Syahin	(Singapore) Police SA (Note: Return to club upon completion of his NS in Jan 2022)	End of National Service
GK	(Singapore) Izwan Mahbud	(Singapore) Lion City Sailors	Free transfer; Contract ends on 2023.
DF	(Brazil) Pedro Henrique	(Portugal) Vitória S.C.	Full transfer; S$2m (€1.3m) transfer fee; Contract ends on 2024
MF	(Singapore) Anumanthan Kumar	(Malaysia) Kedah Darul Aman	Free transfer; Contract ends on 2024.
FW	(South Korea) Kim Shin-Wook	(China) Shanghai Shenhua	Free transfer; Contract ends on 2024.
FW	(Belgium) Maxime Lestienne	(Belgium) Standard Liege	Free transfer; Contract ends on 2023.

=== Out ===
Preseason

Position	Player	Transferred To	Ref
GK	(Singapore) Kimura Riki	(Singapore) Balestier Khalsa	Free transfer
DF	(Brazil) Jorge Fellipe	(Portugal) Académica de Coimbra (P2)	Free transfer
DF	(Singapore) Aqhari Abdullah	(Singapore) Tanjong Pagar United	Free transfer
DF	(Singapore) Ho Wai Loon	(Singapore) Balestier Khalsa	Free transfer
DF	(Singapore) Faizal Roslan	(Singapore) Geylang International	Free transfer
DF	(Singapore) Nabil Iman	(Singapore) GFA Sporting Westlake (SFL1)	Free transfer
MF	(Singapore) Khairul Hairie	(Singapore) Geylang International	Free transfer
FW	(Croatia) Stipe Plazibat	(Romania) Academica Clinceni (R1)	Free transfer

=== Loan Returns ===
Preseason

Position	Player	Transferred from	Ref
GK	(Singapore) Kimura Riki	(Singapore) Balestier Khalsa (Note: Join Balestier Khalsa permanently after his contract end)	Loan Return
GK	(Singapore) Putra Anugerah	(Singapore) Young Lions FC	Loan Return
DF	(Singapore) Ho Wai Loon	(Singapore) Balestier Khalsa (Note: Join Balestier Khalsa permanently after his contract end)	Loan Return
DF	(Singapore) Faizal Roslan	(Singapore) Geylang International (Note: Join Geylang International permanently after his contract end)	Loan Return
MF	(Singapore) Iqram Rifqi	(Singapore) Geylang International	Loan Return
MF	(Singapore) Bill Mamadou	(Singapore) Young Lions FC	Loan Return
FW	(Singapore) Anaqi Ismit	(Singapore) Tanjong Pagar United	Loan Return

Mid-season

Position	Player	Transferred from	Ref
MF	(Singapore) Arshad Shamim	(Singapore) Young Lions FC	Loan Return
GK	(Singapore) Veer Karan Sobti	(Singapore) Tanjong Pagar United (Note: To NS from Oct 2022)	Loan Return

=== Loans Out ===
Preseason

Position	Player	Transferred To	Ref
MF	(Singapore) Arshad Shamim	(Singapore) Young Lions FC (Note: To rejoin in Nov 2022)	On National Service until Nov 2022
MF	(Singapore) Justin Hui	(Singapore) Police SA	On National Service until 2023
DF	(Singapore) Rayyan Ramzdan	(Singapore) SAFSA	On National Service until 2024
MF	(Singapore) Arsyad Basiron	(Singapore) SAFSA	On National Service until 2024
MF	(Singapore) Muhammad Asis	(Singapore) SAFSA	On National Service until 2024
MF	(Singapore) Danie Hafiy	(Singapore) SAFSA	On National Service until 2024
MF	(Singapore) Yasir Nizamudin	(Singapore) SAFSA	On National Service until 2024
GK	(Singapore) Rudy Khairullah	(Singapore) Balestier Khalsa	Year-long loan; Returns on 2023
GK	(Singapore) Veer Karan Sobti	(Singapore) Tanjong Pagar United	Year-long loan;
GK	(Singapore) Putra Anugerah	(Singapore) Young Lions FC	Year-long loan; Returns on 2023

Mid-Season

Position	Player	Transferred To	Ref
DF	(Singapore) Tajeli Salamat	(Singapore) Geylang International (Note: To be released after his contract end at end of season)	Year-long loan; Returns on 2023
GK	(Singapore) Veer Karan Sobti	(Singapore)	On National Service until Oct 2024

=== Contract extensions ===
Position	Player	Ref
GK	(Singapore) Adib Hakim	1-year contract extension; Ends on 2022
GK	(Singapore) Hassan Sunny	1-year contract extension; Ends on 2022
GK	(Singapore) Rudy Khairullah	1-year contract extension; Ends on 2022
GK	(Singapore) Veer Karan Sobti	4 years contract extension; Ends on 2025
DF	(Singapore) Tajeli Salamat	1-year contract extension; Ends on 2022
DF	(Singapore) Amirul Adli	1-year contract extension; Ends on 2022
DF	(Singapore) Naqiuddin Eunos	1-year contract extension; Ends on 2022
DF	(Singapore) Nur Adam Abdullah	1-year contract extension; Ends on 2022
MF	(Singapore) Shahdan Sulaiman	1-year contract extension; Ends on 2022
MF	(Singapore) Hafiz Nor	1-year contract extension; Ends on 2022
MF	(Singapore) Hariss Harun	3.5 years contract extension; Ends on 2024
MF	(Singapore) Saifullah Akbar	1-year contract extension; Ends on 2022
MF	(Singapore) Gabriel Quak	1-year contract extension; Ends on 2022
MF	(Singapore) Aizal Murhamdani	1-year contract extension; Ends on 2022
MF	(Singapore) Adam Swandi	1-year contract; extension; Ends on 2022
MF	(Brazil) Diego Lopes	3 years contract extension; Ends on 2023
FW	(Singapore) Amiruldin Asraf	2 years contract extension; Ends on 2022
FW	(Singapore) Haiqal Pashia	1-year contract extension; Ends on 2022
FW	(Singapore) Faris Ramli	1-year contract extension; Ends on 2022

== Friendlies ==
=== In-season friendlies ===
Win Draw Loss

24 November 2022 Southeast Asia tour	Lion City Sailors (Singapore)	2–7	(Germany) Borussia Dortmund	Jalan Besar
	Adli 32' (o.g.); Quak 68'; Ramli 90+1'	Report	Malen 35', 45'; Bamba 64', 72'; Rijkhoff 84'; Njinmah 86'	Stadium: Jalan Besar Stadium; Attendance: 4,800; Referee: Ahmad A'Qashah (Singapore)

== Team statistics ==
=== Appearances and goals (LCS) ===
As of 5 Nov 2022

No.	Pos.	Player	SPL		Singapore Cup		Charity Shield		AFC Champions League		Total	
No.	Pos.	Player	Apps.	Goals	Apps.	Goals	Apps.	Goals	Apps.	Goals	Apps.	Goals
1	GK	(Singapore) Izwan Mahbud	8	0	3	0	0	0	0	0	11	0
2	DF	(Brazil) Pedro Henrique	21	2	0	0	1	0	6	2	28	4
4	DF	(Singapore) Zulqarnaen Suzliman	1+2	0	0	0	0	0	0	0	3	0
5	DF	(Singapore) Amirul Adli	15+11	0	3	0	0+1	0	4+2	0	36	0
6	MF	(Singapore) Anumanthan Kumar	10+11	1	3	0	0+1	0	1	0	26	1
7	MF	(Singapore) (South Korea) Song Ui-young	20+4	13	0	0	1	0	4+2	3	31	16
8	MF	(Singapore) Shahdan Sulaiman	23+2	5	2+1	0	1	0	6	0	35	5
9	FW	(South Korea) Kim Shin-wook	19+7	21	2+1	1	1	2	2+3	0	35	24
10	MF	(Brazil) Diego Lopes	22+3	10	1+1	0	0+1	0	5+1	1	34	11
11	FW	(Singapore) Hafiz Nor	17+10	3	3	0	0+1	0	0+3	0	34	3
12	DF	(Singapore) Iqram Rifqi	11+4	1	0	0	1	0	6	0	22	1
14	DF	(Singapore) Hariss Harun	23+1	3	2+1	0	1	0	6	0	34	3
16	MF	(Singapore) Hami Syahin	2+8	1	0+1	0	0	0	0+1	0	12	1
17	FW	(Belgium) Maxime Lestienne	18+7	12	3	3	0	0	4+2	1	34	16
18	GK	(Singapore) Hassan Sunny	19	0	0	0	1	0	6	0	26	0
19	DF	(Singapore) Naqiuddin Eunos	3+3	0	0	0	0	0	0+1	0	7	0
20	MF	(Singapore) Arshad Shamim	0	0	0	0	0	0	0	0	0	0
22	FW	(Singapore) Gabriel Quak	11+12	11	2+1	0	0	0	3+1	0	30	11
23	FW	(Singapore) Amiruldin Asraf	2+1	0	0	0	0	0	1+3	0	7	0
25	FW	(Singapore) Haiqal Pashia	5+8	1	1+1	0	0+1	0	2	0	18	1
27	MF	(Singapore) Adam Swandi	10+7	0	2+1	0	1	0	1+3	0	24	0
28	MF	(Singapore) Saifullah Akbar	9+7	1	1+1	0	0	0	0	0	18	1
30	FW	(Singapore) Faris Ramli	10+11	5	3	1	1	0	4+2	0	31	6
55	MF	(Singapore) Glenn Ong Jing Jie	0	0	0	0	1	0	0	0	1	0
66	DF	(Singapore) Nur Adam Abdullah	16+2	0	1	0	0	0	3+2	0	24	0
71	DF	(Singapore) (Mali) Bill Mamadou	2+4	0	1	0	0	0	0	0	7	0
77	MF	(Singapore) Anaqi Ismit	4+1	0	0	0	0	0	0+3	0	8	0
Players featured on a match for LCS, but left the club mid-season, either permanently or on loan transfer
3	DF	(Singapore) Tajeli Salamat	6	0	0	0	1	0	2	0	9	0

=== Appearances and goals (Women) ===
As of 25 Sept 2022

No.	Pos.	Player	WPL		Total	
No.	Pos.	Player	Apps.	Goals	Apps.	Goals
1	GK	(Singapore) Noor Kusumawati	3+2	0	5	0
2	MF	(Canada) Madison Telmer	7+1	6	8	6
3	DF	(Singapore) Fatin Aqillah	11+1	1	12	1
4	DF	(Singapore) Nur Umairah	6+4	1	10	1
5	FW	(Japan) Miray Altun	9+3	2	12	2
7	MF	(Singapore) Sara Merican	5+3	1	8	1
8	DF	(Singapore) Nur Syazwani Ruzi	6+1	1	7	1
9	FW	(Singapore) Nur Syafina Putri	0+2	0	2	0
10	MF	(Singapore) Nur Izzati Rosni	11+1	10	12	10
12	FW	(Germany) Paula Druschke	3+1	1	4	1
13	MF	(Singapore) Ernie Sulastri	11	0	11	0
14	FW	(Singapore) Nicole Lim Yan Xiu	1+2	0	3	0
16	MF	(Singapore) Ho Hui Xin	9+3	1	12	1
17	DF	(Singapore) Khairunnisa Khairol Anwar	8+3	1	11	1
18	MF	(Singapore) Munirah Mohamad	7+1	0	8	0
19	MF	(Germany) Julia-Vanessa Farr	2+1	0	3	0
20	FW	(Singapore) Dorcas Chu	8+3	6	11	6
22	GK	(Singapore) Beatrice Tan	7+1	0	8	0
23	MF	(Singapore) Venetia Lim Ying Xuan	8+2	0	10	0
24	FW	(Singapore) Summer Chong	1+2	0	3	0
25	FW	(Singapore) (France) Lila Tan Hui Ying	5	3	5	3
Players who have played this season but had left the club or on loan to other club
15	FW	(Singapore) Danelle Tan	2+2	5	4	5

== Competitions (LCS) ==
=== Overview ===
As of 12 August 2022

Competition	Record							
Competition	P	W	D	L	GF	GA	GD	Win %
Charity Shield	1	1	0	0	2	1	+1	100.00
Singapore Premier League	28	18	3	7	91	39	+52	64.29
Singapore Cup	3	0	2	1	5	6	−1	0.00
AFC Champions League	6	2	1	3	8	14	−6	33.33
Total	38	21	6	11	106	60	+46	55.26

Results summary (SPL)

Overall								Home						Away					
Pld	W	D	L	GF	GA	GD	Pts	W	D	L	GF	GA	GD	W	D	L	GF	GA	GD
28	18	3	7	91	39	+52	57	10	1	3	40	15	+25	8	2	4	51	24	+27

=== Charity Shield ===
19 February 2022 Charity Shield	Lion City Sailors (Singapore)	2–1	(Japan) Albirex Niigata (S)	Jalan Besar
	Kim Shin-wook 40', 87' (yellow card) 75'	Report (SPL); Report (LCS)	Tadanari Lee 13' (pen.); Tatsuya Sambongi (yellow card) 55'	Stadium: Jalan Besar Stadium; Attendance: 1,000; Referee: Jansen Foo

=== Singapore Premier League ===
Win Draw Loss

27 February 2022 1	Lion City Sailors (Singapore)	3–1	(Singapore) Hougang United	Jalan Besar
	Kim Shin-wook 23'; Iqram Rifqi 66'; Diego Lopes 86'; Anumanthan Kumar (yellow card) 15'	Report	Pedro Bortoluzo 7' (yellow card) 61'; Afiq Noor (yellow card) 83'; Clement Teo (yellow card) 90+4'	Stadium: Jalan Besar Stadium; Attendance: 1,000; Referee: Ahmad A'qashah

4 March 2022 2	Geylang International (Singapore)	1–0	(Singapore) Lion City Sailors	Tampines
	Vincent Bezecourt 9'; Ahmad Syahir (yellow card) 31'; Mohd Noor Ali (yellow card) 69'; Zaiful Nizam (yellow card) 90+4'	Report	Saifullah Akbar (yellow card) 22'; Pedro Henrique (red card) 34'; Anumanthan Kumar (yellow card) 68'; Hafiz Nor (yellow card) 78'	Stadium: Our Tampines Hub; Attendance: 978; Referee: Taufik Thana

13 March 2022 3	Lion City Sailors (Singapore)	1–0	(Singapore) Tampines Rovers	Jalan Besar
	Kim Shin-wook 54' (pen.); Saifullah Akbar (yellow card) 30'; Diego Lopes (yellow card) 76'; Hami Syahin (yellow card) 80'	Report	Taufik Suparno (yellow card) 42'; Christopher van Huizen (yellow card) 53'; Adam Reefdy (yellow card) 77'; Firdaus Kasman (yellow card) 90+1'	Stadium: Jalan Besar Stadium; Attendance: 1,000; Referee: Jansen Foo

18 March 2022 4	Albirex Niigata (S) (Japan)	1–1	(Singapore) Lion City Sailors	Jurong East
	Daichi Omori 45'; Kan Kobayashi (yellow card) 76'; Tatsuya Sambongi (yellow card) 90'	Report	Gabriel Quak 90+1' (pen.); Adam Swandi (yellow card) 49'; Hafiz Nor (yellow card) 90+2'	Stadium: Jurong East Stadium; Referee: Muhammad Taqi

1 April 2022 5	Lion City Sailors (Singapore)	4–0	(Singapore) Balestier Khalsa	Jalan Besar
	Kim Shin-wook 6', 30', 55'; Song Ui-young (yellow card) 22' (goal) 27'	Report	Ryoya Taniguchi (yellow card) 87'	Stadium: Jalan Besar Stadium; Referee: Ahmad A'qashah

6 April 2022 6	Young Lions FC (Singapore)	0–1	(Singapore) Lion City Sailors	Jalan Besar
	Shah Shahiran (yellow card) 63'	Report	Gabriel Quak 15'	Stadium: Jalan Besar Stadium; Referee: Andrea Verolino

9 April 2022 7	Lion City Sailors (Singapore)	6–1	(Singapore) Tanjong Pagar United	Jalan Besar
	Diego Lopes 9', 28'; Shahdan Sulaiman 33'; Kim Shin-wook 46'; Hafiz Nor 73'; Maxime Lestienne 90+1'	Report	Pedro Henrique 71' (o.g.); Fathullah Rahmat (yellow card) 25'; Rusyaidi Salime (yellow card) 51'; Emmeric Ong (yellow card) 53'	Stadium: Jalan Besar Stadium; Referee: Muhammad Taqi

6 May 2022 8	Hougang United (Singapore)	3–4	(Singapore) Lion City Sailors	Hougang
	André Moritz 36', 90+4'; Pedro Bortoluzo 87'	Report	Maxime Lestienne 16'; Kim Shin-wook 24', 42', 56'	Stadium: Hougang Stadium; Referee: Taufik Thana; Man of the Match: (Belgium) Maxime Lestienne

14 May 2022 9	Lion City Sailors (Singapore)	1–0	(Singapore) Geylang International	Jalan Besar
	Diego Lopes 35'; Song Ui-young (yellow card) 47'; Shahdan Sulaiman (yellow card) 59'; Maxime Lestienne (yellow card) 90+3'	Report	Faizal Roslan (yellow card) 26'	Stadium: Jalan Besar Stadium; Referee: Abirami Naidu

21 May 2022 10	Tampines Rovers (Singapore)	0–4	(Singapore) Lion City Sailors	Tampines
	Kyoga Nakamura (yellow card) 54'; Irwan Shah (yellow card) 56'; Yasir Hanapi (yellow card) 90'	Report	Ryaan Sanizal 39' (o.g.); Maxime Lestienne 55' (yellow card) 60'; Song Ui-young 67'; Haiqal Pashia 71'; Nur Adam Abdullah (yellow card) 52'	Stadium: Our Tampines Hub; Referee: Ahmad A'qashah; Man of the Match: (Singapore) Hariss Harun

19 June 2022 11	Balestier Khalsa (Singapore)	1–6	(Singapore) Lion City Sailors	Toa Payoh
	Daniel Goh 90+3' (pen.)	Report	Shahdan Sulaiman 10', 41'; Song Ui-young 19'; Hariss Harun 26'; Gabriel Quak 74'; Faris Ramli 81'	Stadium: Toa Payoh Stadium; Referee: Taufik Thana

24 June 2022 12	Lion City Sailors (Singapore)	1–2	(Japan) Albirex Niigata (S)	Jalan Besar
	Masaya Idetsu 45+1'; Tanaka 54'; Zamani Zamri (yellow card) 32'	Report	Kim Shin-wook 42'; Anumanthan Kumar (yellow card) 33'; Nur Adam Abdullah (yellow card) 60'	Stadium: Jalan Besar Stadium; Attendance: 1,821; Referee: Jansen Foo

29 June 2022 13	Lion City Sailors (Singapore)	5–1	(Singapore) Young Lions FC	Jalan Besar
	Song Ui-young 11'; Shahdan Sulaiman 14'; Hafiz Nor 45'; Kim Shin-wook 56' (pen.); Maxime Lestienne 66'; Anumanthan Kumar (yellow card) 89'	Report	Glenn Kweh 78'	Stadium: Jalan Besar Stadium; Referee: Clarence Leow Hong Wei

3 July 2022 14	Tanjong Pagar United (Singapore)	0–6	(Singapore) Lion City Sailors	Jurong East
	Rusyaidi Salime (yellow card) 84'	Report	Maxime Lestienne 2'; Gabriel Quak 15', 54'; Hariss Harun 18'; Diego Lopes 52', 56'; Adam Swandi (yellow card) 90'	Stadium: Jurong East Stadium; Referee: Andrea Verolino

9 July 2022 15	Lion City Sailors (Singapore)	1–1	(Singapore) Hougang United	Jalan Besar
	Song Ui-young 71'; Hariss Harun (yellow card) 60'	Report	Kristijan Krajcek 66'; Jordan Vestering (yellow card) 25'; Sahil Suhaimi (yellow card) 38'; Lionel Tan (yellow card) 52'	Stadium: Jalan Besar Stadium; Referee: Muhammad Taqi

16 July 2022 16 (Rescheduled)	Geylang International (Singapore)	1–1	(Singapore) Lion City Sailors	Tampines
	Šime Žužul 43' (pen.); Khairul Hairie (yellow card) 50'	Report	Shahdan Sulaiman 45+2'	Stadium: Our Tampines Hub; Referee: Hilmi Fuad

24 July 2022 17	Lion City Sailors (Singapore)	2–1	(Singapore) Tampines Rovers	Jalan Besar
	Song Ui-young 30' (yellow card) 90'; Pedro Henrique 90+4'; Hariss Harun (yellow card) 76'; Kim Do-hoon (yellow card) 89'; Nur Adam Abdullah (yellow card) 89'	Report	Taufik Suparno 77'; Yasir Hanapi (yellow card) 36'; Christopher van Huizen (yellow card) 39'; Boris Kopitović (yellow card) 89'; Syazwan Buhari (yellow card) 90+5'	Stadium: Jalan Besar Stadium; Referee: Ahmad A'qashah

29 July 2022 18	Albirex Niigata (S) (Japan)	4–2	(Singapore) Lion City Sailors	Jurong East
	Kodai Tanaka 23', 38'; Kan Kobayashi 58'; Tadanari Lee 84'; Daichi Omori (yellow card) 11'	Report	Anumanthan Kumar 21'; Kim Shin-wook 74'; Hariss Harun (yellow card) 59'; Nur Adam Abdullah (yellow card) 62'; Saifullah Akbar (yellow card) 74'; Gabriel Quak (yellow card) 90+4'	Stadium: Jurong East Stadium; Attendance: 2,700; Referee: Taufik Thana

6 August 2022 19	Lion City Sailors (Singapore)	4–0	(Singapore) Balestier Khalsa	Jalan Besar
	Kim Shin-wook 5' (pen.); Maxime Lestienne 70'; Saifullah Akbar 72' (yellow card) 89'; Song Ui-young 77'; Amirul Adli (yellow card) 55'; Diego Lopes (yellow card) 62'	Report	Kuraba Kondo (penalty missed)	Stadium: Jalan Besar Stadium; Referee: Ahmad A'qashah

13 August 2022 20	Young Lions FC (Singapore)	1–10	(Singapore) Lion City Sailors	Jalan Besar
	Rasaq Akeem 16'; Arshad Shamim (yellow card) 65'	Report	Maxime Lestienne 7', 34'; Gabriel Quak 12', 33'; Kim Shin-wook 15', 50', 62'; Song Ui-young 74', 81'; Hami Syahin 85'; Nur Adam Abdullah (yellow card) 26'	Stadium: Jalan Besar Stadium; Referee: Shadiq Al-Hussain

20 August 2022 21	Lion City Sailors (Singapore)	7–0	(Singapore) Tanjong Pagar United	Jalan Besar
	Maxime Lestienne 17'; Hafiz Nor 45'; Gabriel Quak 53'; Kim Shin-wook 58'; Diego Lopes 68' (pen.); Song Ui-young 74'; Diego Lopes 87'	Report	Khairul Amri (yellow card) 85'	Stadium: Jalan Besar Stadium; Referee: Taufik Thana

26 August 2022 22	Hougang United (Singapore)	4–9	(Singapore) Lion City Sailors	Hougang
	Shawal Anuar 9'; Amy Recha 54', 57'; Pedro Bortoluzo 90+3'; Kristijan Krajcek (yellow card) 45'	Report	Pedro Henrique 11'; Diego Lopes 13'; Faris Ramli 29', 69'; Kim Shin-wook 34', 44', 66'; Maxime Lestienne 51'; Song Ui-young 80' (yellow card) 63'	Stadium: Hougang Stadium; Referee: Andrea Verolino

4 September 2022 23	Lion City Sailors (Singapore)	1–3	(Singapore) Geylang International	Jalan Besar
	Maxime Lestienne 7'; Hariss Harun (yellow card) 81'; Hafiz Nor (yellow card) 83'; Kim Shin-wook (yellow card) 90+4'	Report	Vincent Bezecourt 12', 36'; Hazzuwan Halim 43'; Ilhan Noor (yellow card) 18'; Umar Ramle (yellow card) 21'; Takahiro Tezuka (yellow card) 90+5'	Stadium: Jalan Besar Stadium; Referee: Jansen Foo

10 September 2022 24	Tampines Rovers (Singapore)	2–1	(Singapore) Lion City Sailors	Tampines
	Boris Kopitović 54'; Zehrudin Mehmedović 58'; Amirul Haikal (yellow card) 39'; Yasir Hanapi (yellow card) 79'	Report	Maxime Lestienne 55'; Amirul Adli (yellow card) 72'	Stadium: Our Tampines Hub; Referee: Muhammad Taqi

21 October 2022 25 (Rescheduled)	Lion City Sailors (Singapore)	2–1	(Singapore) Young Lions FC	Jalan Besar
	Faris Ramli 48' 67'; Adam Swandi (yellow card) 45'; Saifullah Akbar (yellow card) 82'	Report	Jordan Emaviwe 85' (pen.); Jared Gallagher (yellow card) 79'	Stadium: Jalan Besar Stadium; Referee: Ahmad A'qashah

2 October 2022 26	Balestier Khalsa (Singapore)	5–3	(Singapore) Lion City Sailors	Toa Payoh
	Ryoya Taniguchi 44', 48', 75'; Daniel Goh 50' (yellow card) 70'; Shuhei Hoshino 58' (penalty missed) 68'	Report	Song Ui-young 30', 31'; Hariss Harun 62' (red card) 88'; Adam Swandi (yellow card) 61'; Maxime Lestienne (yellow card) 90+1'	Stadium: Toa Payoh Stadium; Referee: Shadiq Al-Hussain

7 October 2022 27	Lion City Sailors (Singapore)	2–4	(Japan) Albirex Niigata (S)	Jalan Besar
	Kim Shin-wook 16'; Gabriel Quak 84' (pen.); Faris Ramli (yellow card) 45+1'; Song Ui-young (yellow card) 61'; Adam Swandi (yellow card) 69'	Report	Ilhan Fandi 5'; Kodai Tanaka 37', 77', 90+3'; Keito Hariya (yellow card) 48'	Stadium: Jalan Besar Stadium; Referee: Muhammad Taqi

14 October 2022 28 (Rescheduled)	Tanjong Pagar United (Singapore)	1–3	(Singapore) Lion City Sailors	Jurong East
	Shodai Nishikawa 72'; Fathullah Rahmat (yellow card) 59'; Faizal Raffi (yellow card) 90+1'	Report	Diego Lopes 17'; Gabriel Quak 74' 89'; Haifz Nor (yellow card) 22'; Maxime Lestienne (yellow card) 42'	Stadium: Jurong East Stadium; Referee: Jansen Foo

Pos	Team	Pld	W	D	L	GF	GA	GD	Pts	Qualification or relegation
1	Albirex Niigata (S) (Note: The foreign club – Albirex Niigata (S) – as well as the Football Association of Singapore (FAS) under-21 team, Young Lions, are ineligible for any AFC competition spots.) (C)	28	17	8	3	88	43	+45	59	
2	Lion City Sailors (Q)	28	18	3	7	91	39	+52	57	Qualification for AFC Champions League Group stage
3	Tampines Rovers (Q)	28	15	5	8	76	57	+19	50	Standby team for AFC Cup group stage
4	Geylang International	28	10	9	9	48	46	+2	39	
5	Hougang United	28	10	9	9	65	71	−6	39	Qualification for AFC Cup group stage (Cup Winner)

Source: Singapore Premier League
Rules for classification: 1) points; 2) goal difference; 3) number of goals scored; 4) number of wins
(C) Champions; (Q) Qualified for the phase indicated

=== Singapore Cup ===
Pos	Team	Pld	W	D	L	GF	GA	GD	Pts	Qualification
1	Albirex Niigata (S) (Q)	3	3	0	0	7	1	+6	9	Semi-finals
2	Balestier Khalsa (Q)	3	1	1	1	8	6	+2	4	Semi-finals
3	Lion City Sailors	3	0	2	1	5	6	−1	2	
4	Young Lions FC	3	0	1	2	3	10	−7	1	

Updated to match(es) played on 25 September 2019. Source: FAS
(Q) Qualified for the phase indicated

Win Draw Loss

==== Group ====
27 October 2022 Match 1	Lion City Sailors (Singapore)	3–3	(Singapore) Balestier Khalsa	Jalan Besar
	Faris Ramli 14'; Maxime Lestienne 47' 57'; Adam Swandi (yellow card) 22'	Report	Kuraba Kondo 22' 55'; Shuhei Hoshino 66'; Darren Teh (yellow card) 59'	Stadium: Jalan Besar Stadium; Referee: Ahmad A'qashah

31 October 2022 Match 2	Young Lions FC (Singapore)	1–1	(Singapore) Lion City Sailors	Jalan Besar
	Izwan Mahbud 45' (o.g.); Syahrul Sazali (yellow card) 51'; Shah Shahiran (yellow card) 57'; Syed Akmal (yellow card) 88'; Fairuz Fazli Koh (yellow card) 90+2'	Report	Saifullah Akbar (yellow card) 19'; Kim Shin-wook 74' (yellow card) 57'; Maxime Lestienne (yellow card) 71'	Stadium: Jalan Besar Stadium; Referee: Taufik Thana

5 November 2022 Match 3	Lion City Sailors (Singapore)	1–2	(Japan) Albirex Niigata (S)	Jalan Besar
	Anumanthan Kumar (yellow card) 20'; Maxime Lestienne 73' (yellow card) 45'; Haifz Nor (yellow card) 87'	Report	Masaya Idetsu 30' (yellow card) 47'; Kodai Tanaka 84'	Stadium: Jalan Besar Stadium; Referee: Farhad Mohamed

=== AFC Champions League ===
Win Draw Loss

==== Group stage ====
Pos	Team	Pld	W	D	L	GF	GA	GD	Pts	Qualification	DAE	URA	LCS	SDT
1	(South Korea) Daegu FC	6	4	1	1	14	4	+10	13 (Note: Head-to-head points: Daegu FC 4, Urawa Red Diamonds 1.)	Advance to Round of 16	—	1–0	0–3	4–0
2	(Japan) Urawa Red Diamonds	6	4	1	1	20	2	+18	13	Advance to Round of 16	0–0	—	6–0	5–0
3	(Singapore) Lion City Sailors	6	2	1	3	8	14	−6	7		1–2	1–4	—	3–2
4	(China) Shandong Taishan	6	0	1	5	2	24	−22	1		0–7	0–5	0–0	—

Source: AFC
Rules for classification: Tiebreakers
Notes:

15 April 2022 Matchday 1	Lion City Sailors (Singapore)	1–4	(Japan) Urawa Red Diamonds	Buriram
21:00 UTC+7	David Moberg Karlsson 43' (o.g.); Hafiz Nor (yellow card) 24'	Report	Kasper Junker 7'; Ataru Esaka 15'; David Moberg Karlsson 42'; Yusuke Matsuo 47'	Stadium: Chang Arena; Attendance: 394; Referee: Salman Falahi (Qatar)

18 April 2022 Matchday 2	Daegu (South Korea)	0–3	(Singapore) Lion City Sailors	Buriram
18:00 UTC+7	Hong Chul (red card) 89'; Hong Jeong-woon (yellow card) 90'	Report	Song Ui-young 21'; Diego Lopes 71' (yellow card) 85'; Pedro Henrique 81'	Stadium: Khao Kradong Stadium; Attendance: 2,671; Referee: Omar Al Ali (UAE)

21 April 2022 Matchday 3	Shandong Taishan (China)	0–0	(Singapore) Lion City Sailors	Buriram
18:00 UTC+7		Report	Adam Swandi (yellow card) 68'	Stadium: Khao Kradong Stadium; Attendance: 225; Referee: Abdulla Ali Al-Marri (Qatar)

24 April 2022 Matchday 4	Lion City Sailors (Singapore)	3–2	(China) Shandong Taishan	Buriram
21:00 UTC+7	Song Ui-young 45+2'; Pedro Henrique 60'; Maxime Lestienne 71'	Report	Lu Yongtao 76' (pen.); Liu Guobao 90'	Stadium: Chang Arena; Attendance: 160; Referee: Masoud Tufaylieh (Syria)

27 April 2022 Matchday 5	Urawa Red Diamonds (Japan)	6–0	(Singapore) Lion City Sailors	Buriram
18:00 UTC+7	Kazuaki Mawatari 14'; Alex Schalk 39'; David Moberg Karlsson 48'; Yoshio Koizumi 52'; Yusuke Matsuo 62', 90'	Report	Shahdan Sulaiman (yellow card) 45'; Nur Adam Abdullah (yellow card) 40+4'	Stadium: Khao Kradong Stadium; Attendance: 313; Referee: Omar Al Ali (UAE)

30 April 2022 Matchday 6	Lion City Sailors (Singapore)	1–2	(South Korea) Daegu	Buriram
18:00 UTC+7	Song Ui-young 26'; Iqram Rifqi (yellow card) 50'; Nur Adam Abdullah (yellow card) 70'	Report	Lee Keun-ho 54'; Zeca 81' (pen.)	Stadium: Chang Arena; Attendance: 280; Referee: Ahmed Al-Ali (Jordan)

== Competition (Women) ==
=== Women's Premier League ===
Win Draw Loss

5 June 2022 1	Lion City Sailors (Singapore)	4–1	(Japan) Albirex Niigata (S)	Yishun
	Nur Izzati Rosni 45', 87'; Dorcas Chu 49'; Madison Telmer 64'	Report	Nadhra Aqilah 77'	Stadium: Yishun Stadium

3 August 2022 2 (Rescheduled)	Balestier Khalsa (Singapore)	0–4	(Singapore) Lion City Sailors	Yishun
			Danelle Tan 62'; Nur Syazwani 79'; Dorcas Chu 90'; Nur Izzati Rosni 90+4'	Stadium: Yishun Stadium

18 June 2022 3	Lion City Sailors (Singapore)	6–0	(Singapore) Hougang United	Yishun
	Lila Tan Hui Ying 32', 59'; Dorcas Chu 43', 51'; Khairunnisa Anwar 69'; Madison Telmer 90'	Report		Stadium: Yishun Stadium

16 July 2022 4	Still Aerion (Singapore)	0–4	(Singapore) Lion City Sailors	Yishun
		Report	Nur Izzati Rosni 30', 59'; Danelle Tan 46', 61'	Stadium: Yishun Stadium

23 July 2022 5	Lion City Sailors (Singapore)	2–1	(Singapore) Tiong Bahru FC	Yishun
	Danelle Tan 62', 74'		Nur Raudhah Kamis 89'	Stadium: Yishun Stadium

30 July 2022 6	Tanjong Pagar United (Singapore)	0–0	(Singapore) Lion City Sailors	Yishun
				Stadium: Yishun Stadium

14 August 2022 7	Albirex Niigata (S) (Japan)	0–4	(Singapore) Lion City Sailors	Yishun
			Nur Izzati Rosni 1', 57', 64'; Miray Altun 38'	Stadium: Yishun Stadium

20 August 2022 8	Lion City Sailors (Singapore)	3–0	(Singapore) Balestier Khalsa	Yishun
	Umairah Hamdan 13'; Nur Izzati Rosni 18'; Dorcas Chu 76'			Stadium: Yishun Stadium

27 August 2022 9	Hougang United (Singapore)	0–6	(Singapore) Lion City Sailors	Yishun
			Nur Izzati Rosni; Moray Altun; Madison Telmer; Sara Merican	Stadium: Yishun Stadium

10 September 2022 10 (Rescheduled)	Lion City Sailors (Singapore)	4–0	(Singapore) Still Aerion	Yishun
	Madison Telmer 45'; Paula Druschke 52'; Dorcas Chu 77'; Madison Telmer 86'			Stadium: Yishun Stadium

24 September 2022 11 (Rescheduled)	Tiong Bahru FC (Singapore)	0–0	(Singapore) Lion City Sailors	Yishun
				Stadium: Yishun Stadium

1 October 2022 12 (Rescheduled)	Lion City Sailors (Singapore)	2–1	(Singapore) Tanjong Pagar United	Yishun
	Lila Tan Hui Ying 65'; Fatin Aqillah 90+3'		Yuki Monden 34'	Stadium: Yishun Stadium

League table

Pos	Team	Pld	W	D	L	GF	GA	GD	Pts	Qualification or relegation
1	Lion City Sailors	12	10	2	0	39	3	+36	32	League champions
2	(Japan) Albirex Niigata (S)	12	8	1	3	31	16	+15	25	
3	Tanjong Pagar United	12	7	2	3	24	11	+13	23	
4	Tiong Bahru	12	4	3	5	15	12	+3	15	
5	Balestier Khalsa	12	2	5	5	7	19	−12	11	
6	Still Aerion	12	3	1	8	11	29	−18	10	
7	Hougang United	12	0	2	10	8	45	−37	2	

Updated to match(es) played on 1 October 2022. Source: FAS

=== Singa Cup ===
Win Draw Loss

17 October 2022 Matchday 1	Lion City Sailors (Singapore)	1–3	(Philippines) Kaya–Iloilo	Dairy Farm
	Madison Telmer 74'	Report	Dionesa Tolentin 37', 39'; Rochelle Mendano 90'	Stadium: German European School Singapore

19 October 2022 Matchday 2	Lion City Sailors (Singapore)	3–1	(Indonesia) Persib Putri	Bedok
	Miray Altun 29'; Paula Druschke 45'; Izzati Rosni 57'	Report	Nopianti Putri 49'	Stadium: Bedok Stadium

21 October 2022 Matchday 3	Lion City Sailors (Singapore)	3–0	(Thailand) Phranakorn FC	Dairy Farm
	Miray Altun 76' 86'; Paula Druschke 88'	Report		Stadium: German European School Singapore

League table

Pos	Team	Pld	W	D	L	GF	GA	GD	Pts	Qualification or relegation
1	(Philippines) Kaya–Iloilo	3	3	0	0	17	1	+16	9	Champions
2	(Singapore) Lion City Sailors	3	2	0	1	7	4	+3	6	
3	(Thailand) Phranakorn FC	3	1	0	2	3	10	−7	3	
4	(Indonesia) Persib Putri	3	0	0	3	2	14	−12	0	

Updated to match(es) played on 1 October 2022. Source: FAS

Note: Kaya beats Phranakorn and Persib 6–0 and 8–0 respectively while Phranakorn beats Persib 3–1

=== Women's National League ===
(Played under name of Mattar Sailors Women)

Win Draw Loss

8 October 2022 1	Mattar Sailors (Singapore)	0–2	(Singapore) Police SA	Yishun
				Stadium: Yishun Stadium

15 October 2022 2	Mattar Sailors (Singapore)	5–0	Singapore Khalsa Association	Yishun
				Stadium: Yishun Stadium

22 October 2022 3	Mattar Sailors (Singapore)	12–0	(Singapore) Westwood El'Junior FC	Yishun
				Stadium: Yishun Stadium

League table

Pos	Team	Pld	W	D	L	GF	GA	GD	Pts	Qualification or relegation
1	Police Sports Association (Q)	3	3	0	0	23	0	+23	9	Qualified for Semi Final
2	Mattar Sailors	3	2	0	1	17	2	+15	6	
3	Singapore Khalsa Association	3	1	0	2	5	12	−7	3	
4	Westwood El'Junior FC	3	0	0	3	0	31	−31	0	

Updated to match(es) played on 1 October 2022. Source: FAS
(Q) Qualified for the phase indicated

== Competition (SFL) ==
=== Singapore Football League D1 ===
Win Draw Loss

5 June 2022 1	Mattar Sailors (Singapore)	0–2	Singapore Khalsa Association	Clementi
				Stadium: Clementi Stadium

11 June 2022 2	Warwick Knights (Singapore)	2–2	(Singapore) Mattar Sailors	Choa Chu Kang
	Fazli Jaffar			Stadium: Choa Chu Kang Stadium

18 June 2022 3	Mattar Sailors (Singapore)	1–1	(Singapore) Yishun Sentek Mariners	Jalan Besar
				Stadium: Jalan Besar Stadium

26 June 2022 4	GFA Sporting Westlake (Singapore)	2–0	(Singapore) Mattar Sailors	Clementi
				Stadium: Clementi Stadium

3 July 2022 5	Mattar Sailors (Singapore)	0–1	(Singapore) Katong FC	Clementi
				Stadium: Clementi Stadium

17 July 2022 6	Project Vaults Oxley SC (Singapore)	1–0	(Singapore) Mattar Sailors	Clementi
	Ruzree Rohzaini 50'			Stadium: Clementi Stadium

23 July 2022 7	Mattar Sailors (Singapore)	3–6	(Singapore) Tiong Bahru FC	Hougang
			Gautam Selvamany; Liam Shotton; Goh Swee Swee; Aloysius Yap	Stadium: Hougang Stadium

30 July 2022 8	Singapore Khalsa Association	1–0	(Singapore) Mattar Sailors	Jalan Besar
	Mathew Silva 16'			Stadium: Jalan Besar Stadium

6 August 2022 9	Mattar Sailors (Singapore)	1–3	(Singapore) Warwick Knights	Choa Chu Kang
	Rizqin Aniq 15'		Zamri Kamal 23'; Poh Yi Feng 36'; Fazrul Nawaz 89'	Stadium: Choa Chu Kang Stadium

14 August 2022 10	Yishun Sentek Mariners (Singapore)	3–1	(Singapore) Mattar Sailors	Clementi
				Stadium: Clementi Stadium

21 August 2022 11	Mattar Sailors (Singapore)	0–0	(Singapore) GFA Sporting Westlake	Clementi
				Stadium: Clementi Stadium

27 August 2022 12	Katong FC (Singapore)	0–1	(Singapore) Mattar Sailors	Choa Chu Kang
			Fakis 87'	Stadium: Choa Chu Kang Stadium

4 September 2022 13	Mattar Sailors (Singapore)	1–1	(Singapore) Project Vaults Oxley	Clementi
				Stadium: Clementi Stadium

10 September 2022 14	Tiong Bahru FC (Singapore)	1–0	(Singapore) Mattar Sailors	Jalan Besar
				Stadium: Jalan Besar Stadium

League table

Pos	Team	Pld	W	D	L	GF	GA	GD	Pts	Qualification or relegation
1	Singapore Khalsa Association	14	8	4	2	36	18	+18	28	League champions
2	Yishun Sentek Mariners	14	5	7	2	26	20	+6	22	
3	Warwick Knights	14	5	6	3	23	21	+2	21	
4	Katong FC	14	6	3	5	19	17	+2	21	
5	Tiong Bahru FC	14	5	3	6	27	25	+2	18	
6	Project Vaults Oxley	14	4	4	6	20	26	−6	16	
7	GFA Sporting Westlake FC	14	3	7	4	20	30	−10	16	Relegated
8	Mattar Sailors	14	1	4	9	10	24	−14	7	Relegated

Updated to match(es) played on 15 Sept 2022. Source: Singapore Premier League
