= Swimming at the 2013 SEA Games – Women's 50 metre freestyle =

The Women's 50 metre freestyle event at the 2013 SEA Games took place on 16 December 2013 at Wunna Theikdi Aquatics Centre.

There were 13 competitors from 8 countries who took part in this event. Two heats were held. The heat in which a swimmer competed did not formally matter for advancement, as the swimmers with the top eight times from both field qualified for the finals.

== Schedule ==
All times are Myanmar Standard Time (UTC+06:30)

Date	Time	Event
Monday, 16 December 2013	09:05	Heats
Monday, 16 December 2013	18:22	Final

== Records ==
Prior to this competition, the existing world, Asian, and Southeast Asian Games records were as follows.

World Record	Britta Steffen (GER)	23.73	Rome, Italy	2 August 2009
Asian Record	Le Jingyi (CHN)	24.51	Rome, Italy	11 September 1994
Games Record	Amanda Lim (SIN)	25.77	Palembang, Indonesia	15 November 2011

== Results ==
=== Heats ===
Rank	Heat	Lane	Athlete	Time	Notes
1	2	5	Jenjira Srisa Ard (THA)	26.13	Q
2	2	4	Amanda Lim (SIN)	26.16	Q
3	1	5	Jasmine Al-Khaldi (PHI)	26.22	Q
4	2	3	Natthanan Junkrajang (THA)	26.88	Q
5	1	4	Quah Ting Wen (SIN)	27.14	Q
6	2	6	Tran Tam Nguyen (VIE)	27.56	Q
7	1	3	Patricia Yosita Hapsari (INA)	27.75	Q
8	1	7	Kathriana Mella Gustianjani (INA)	28.26	Q
9	1	6	Ei Ei Thet (MYA)	29.12	
10	2	2	K Zin Win (MYA)	30.27	
11	1	2	Vitiny Hemthon (CAM)	31.56	
12	2	7	Samphors Seng (CAM)	32.65	
13	2	1	Veomany Siriphone (LAO)	33.57	

=== Final ===
Rank	Lane	Athlete	Time	Notes
1st place, gold medalist(s)	5	Amanda Lim (SIN)	25.69	GR
2nd place, silver medalist(s)	6	Natthanan Junkrajang (THA)	25.80	
3rd place, bronze medalist(s)	4	Jenjira Srisa Ard (THA)	25.90	
4	3	Jasmine Al-Khaldi (PHI)	26.02	
5	2	Quah Ting Wen (SIN)	26.52	
6	7	Tran Tam Nguyen (VIE)	27.18	
7	1	Patricia Yosita Hapsari (INA)	27.31	
8	8	Kathriana Mella Gustianjani (INA)	27.84	
