= Swimming at the 2013 SEA Games – Women's 100 metre freestyle =

The Women's 100 metre freestyle event at the 2013 SEA Games took place on 12–13 December 2013 at Wunna Theikdi Aquatics Centre.

There were 13 competitors from 7 countries who took part in this event. Two heats were held. The heat in which a swimmer competed did not formally matter for advancement, as the swimmers with the top eight times from both field qualified for the finals.

== Schedule ==
All times are Myanmar Standard Time (UTC+06:30)

Date	Time	Event
Thursday, 12 December 2013	09:18	Heats
Friday, 13 December 2013	18:00	Final

== Records ==
Prior to this competition, the existing world, Asian, and Southeast Asian Games records were as follows.

World Record	Britta Steffen (GER)	52.07	Rome, Italy	31 July 2009
Asian Record	Pang Jiaying (CHN)	53.13	Jinan, China	22 October 2009
Games Record	Quah Ting Wen (SIN)	56.03	Vientiane, Laos	10 December 2009

== Results ==
=== Heats ===
Rank	Heat	Lane	Athlete	Time	Notes
1	1	5	Amanda Lim (SIN)	57.68	Q
2	1	4	Jasmine Al-Khaldi (PHI)	57.76	Q
3	1	3	Jenjira Srisa Ard (THA)	58.33	Q
4	2	4	Quah Ting Wen (SIN)	58.39	Q
5	2	5	Natthanan Junkrajang (THA)	58.49	Q
6	2	3	Patricia Yosita Hapsari (INA)	58.78	Q
7	2	6	Tran Tam Nguyen (VIE)	59.32	Q
8	2	1	Kathriana Mella Gustianjani (INA)	59.65	
9	2	2	Le Thi My Thao (VIE)	1:02.68	Q
10	2	7	K Zin Win (MYA)	1:04.42	
11	1	2	Ei Ei Thet (MYA)	1:05.10	
12	1	7	Vitiny Hemthon (CAM)	1:08.49	
-	1	6	Hannah Dato (PHI)	DNS	

=== Final ===
Rank	Lane	Athlete	Time	Notes
1st place, gold medalist(s)	2	Natthanan Junkrajang (THA)	56.23	
2nd place, silver medalist(s)	6	Quah Ting Wen (SIN)	56.54	
3rd place, bronze medalist(s)	5	Jasmine Al-Khaldi (PHI)	56.63	
4	4	Amanda Lim (SIN)	56.85	
5	3	Jenjira Srisa Ard (THA)	57.49	
6	7	Patricia Yosita Hapsari (INA)	58.14	
7	1	Tran Tam Nguyen (VIE)	58.72	
8	8	Le Thi My Thao (VIE)	1:02.07	
