= Swimming at the 2013 SEA Games – Women's 200 metre freestyle =

The Women's 200 metre freestyle event at the 2013 SEA Games took place on 15 December 2013 at Wunna Theikdi Aquatics Centre.

There were 10 competitors from 6 countries who took part in this event. Two heats were held. The heat in which a swimmer competed did not formally matter for advancement, as the swimmers with the top eight times from both field qualified for the finals.

== Schedule ==
All times are Myanmar Standard Time (UTC+06:30)

Date	Time	Event
Thursday, 15 December 2013	09:14	Heats
Thursday, 15 December 2013	18:26	Final

== Records ==
Prior to this competition, the existing world, Asian, and Southeast Asian Games records were as follows.

World Record	Federica Pellegrini (ITA)	1:52.98	Rome, Italy	29 July 2009
Asian Record	Pang Jiaying (CHN)	1:55.05	Beijing, China	13 August 2008
Games Record	Quah Ting Wen (SIN)	2:00.57	Vientiane, Laos	13 December 2009

== Results ==
=== Heats ===
Rank	Heat	Lane	Athlete	Time	Notes
1	1	4	Quah Ting Wen (SIN)	2:05.75	Q
2	1	5	Nguyen Thi Anh Vien (VIE)	2:07.07	Q
3	2	4	Natthanan Junkrajang (THA)	2:07.24	Q
4	1	6	Ressa Kania Dewi (INA)	2:07.45	Q
5	2	5	Lynette Lim (SIN)	2:07.88	Q
6	2	3	Jasmine Al-Khaldi (PHI)	2:07.99	
7	1	3	Tran Tam Nguyen (VIE)	2:10.57	Q
8	2	2	Ei Ei Thet (MYA)	2:20.67	Q
9	1	2	K Zin Win (MYA)	2:21.89	Q
—	2	6	Patricia Yosita Hapsari (INA)	DNS	

=== Final ===
Rank	Lane	Athlete	Time	Notes
1st place, gold medalist(s)	3	Natthanan Junkrajang (THA)	2:01.03	
2nd place, silver medalist(s)	4	Quah Ting Wen (SIN)	2:01.74	
3rd place, bronze medalist(s)	2	Lynette Lim (SIN)	2:02.62	
4	5	Nguyen Thi Anh Vien (VIE)	2:04.42	
5	6	Ressa Kania Dewi (INA)	2:06.23	
6	7	Tran Tam Nguyen (VIE)	2:08.92	
7	8	K Zin Win (MYA)	2:19.50	
8	1	Ei Ei Thet (MYA)	2:20.43	
