= Swimming at the 2015 SEA Games – Women's 4 × 200 metre freestyle relay =

Swimming – Women's 4 × 200 metre freestyle relay at the 2015 SEA Games
- Venue: OCBC Aquatic Centre
- Date: 6 June 2015
- Competitors: 12 from 3 nations

Medalists
gold medal	Singapore (SIN)
silver medal	Thailand (THA)
bronze medal	Indonesia (INA)

The women's 4 × 200 metre freestyle relay competition of the swimming events at the 2015 SEA Games was held on 8 June at the OCBC Aquatic Centre in Singapore.

== Schedule ==
All times are Singapore Standard Time (UTC+08:00)

Date	Time	Event
Monday, 8 June 2015	20:34	Final

== Records ==
Prior to this competition, the existing Asian and Games records were as follows:

Asian Record	China (CHN)	7:42.08	Rome, Italy	30 July 2009
Games Record	Singapore (SIN)	8:11.75	Vientiane, Laos	10 December 2009

== Results ==
KEY:	GR	Games record	NR	National record	PB	Personal best	SB	Seasonal best

=== Final ===
Source: Final Results

The final was held on 8 June.

Rank	Lane	Team	Time	Notes
1st place, gold medalist(s)	4	Singapore (SIN): Christie May Chue Mun Ee (2:04.63); Amanda Lim Xiang Qi (2:04.40); Tseng Wei Wen Rachel (2:04.02); Quah Ting Wen (1:59.90)	8:12.95	
2nd place, silver medalist(s)	5	Thailand (THA): Kornkarnjana Sapianchai (2:04.36); Patarawadee Kittiya (2:03.93); Benjaporn Sriphanomthorn (2:03.20); Natthanan Junkrajang (2:01.94)	8:13.43	NR
3rd place, bronze medalist(s)	3	Indonesia (INA): Sagita Putri Krisdewanti (2:05.95); Ressa Kania Dewi (2:06.79); Kathriana Mella Gustianji (2:09.67); Patricia Yosita Hapsari (2:08.56)	8:30.97	NR
