= German European School =

German European School may refer to:

- German European School Manila
- German European School Singapore
