= Swimming at the 2013 SEA Games – Women's 100 metre backstroke =

The Women's 100 metre backstroke event at the 2013 SEA Games took place on 14 December 2013 at Wunna Theikdi Aquatics Centre.

There were 10 competitors from 6 countries who took part in this event. Two heats were held. The heat in which a swimmer competed did not formally matter for advancement, as the swimmers with the top eight times from both field qualified for the finals.

== Schedule ==
All times are Myanmar Standard Time (UTC+06:30)

Date	Time	Event
Thursday, 14 December 2013	09:14	Heats
Thursday, 14 December 2013	18:21	Final

== Records ==
Prior to this competition, the existing world, Asian, and Southeast Asian Games records were as follows.

World Record	Gemma Spofforth (GBR)	58.12	Rome, Italy	28 July 2009
Asian Record	Aya Terakawa (JPN)	58.83	London, United Kingdom	30 July 2012
Games Record	Tao Li (SIN)	1:02.11	Palembang, Indonesia	16 November 2011

== Results ==
=== Heats ===
Rank	Heat	Lane	Athlete	Time	Notes
1	1	4	Tao Li (SIN)	1:05.45	Q
2	2	4	Nguyen Thi Anh Vien (VIE)	1:05.77	Q
3	1	5	Parita Damrongrat (THA)	1:05.92	Q
4	2	6	Meagan Lim (SIN)	1:07.33	Q
5	2	5	Natthanan Junkrajang (THA)	1:07.36	Q
6	2	3	Yessy Venesia Yosaputra (INA)	1:08.88	Q
7	1	3	Nurul Fajar Fitriyati (INA)	1:10.37	Q
8	2	2	Thiri Nandar (MYA)	1:14.53	Q
9	1	6	K Zin Win (MYA)	1:15.10	
10	1	2	Samphors Seng (CAM)	1:20.14	

=== Final ===
Rank	Lane	Athlete	Time	Notes
1st place, gold medalist(s)	4	Tao Li (SIN)	1:02.47	
2nd place, silver medalist(s)	5	Nguyen Thi Anh Vien (VIE)	1:02.76	
3rd place, bronze medalist(s)	2	Natthanan Junkrajang (THA)	1:04.03	
4	6	Meagan Lim (SIN)	1:05.22	
5	1	Nurul Fajar Fitriyati (INA)	1:05.62	
6	3	Parita Damrongrat (THA)	1:05.81	
7	7	Yessy Venesia Yosaputra (INA)	1:06.27	
8	8	Thiri Nandar (MYA)	1:18.72	
