= Swimming at the 2013 SEA Games – Men's 4 × 100 metre medley relay =

The Men's 4 × 100 metre medley relay event at the 2013 SEA Games took place on 16 December 2013 at Wunna Theikdi Aquatics Centre.

There were 6 teams who took part in this event. Indonesia won the gold medal, Singapore and Thailand won the silver and bronze medal respectively. However, Indonesia was disqualified and promoting Singapore to the gold medal, Thailand to silver medal and Malaysia to bronze medal respectively.

== Schedule ==
All times are Myanmar Standard Time (UTC+06:30)

Date	Time	Event
Monday, 16 December 2013	18:52	Final

== Records ==
Prior to this competition, the existing world, Asian, and Southeast Asian Games records were as follows.

World Record	United States	3:27.28	Rome, Italy	2 August 2009
Asian Record	Japan	3:30.74	Rome, Italy	2 August 2009
Games Record	Indonesia	3:41.35	Palembang, Indonesia	17 November 2011

== Results ==
Rank	Lane	Nation	Swimmers	Time	Notes
1	6	Singapore (SIN)	Quah Zheng Wen (56.89); Christopher Cheong (1:04.51); Joseph Schooling (51.98); Clement Lim (50.24)	3:43.62	
2	2	Thailand (THA)	Kasipat Chograthin (58.44); Radomyos Matjiur (1:02.65); Supakrid Pananuratana (55.48); Cholawat Phoduang (51.37)	3:47.94	
3	5	Malaysia (MAS)	Tern Jian Han (58.37); Yap Kah Choon Shaun (1:03.76); Daniel Bego (55.82); Lim Ching Hwang (50.79)	3:48.74	
4	7	Vietnam (VIE)	Tran Duy Khoi (58.17); Huynh The Vi (1:05.67); Hoang Quy Phuoc (53.81); Pham Thanh Nguyen (53.16)	3:50.81	
5	3	Myanmar (MYA)	Aung Myo Oo (1:04.37); Ye Myint Hane (1:07.13); Thiha Aung (1:02.81); Win Htet Oo (54.03)	4:08.34	
6	4	Indonesia (INA)	I Gede Siman Sudartawa (55.96); Indra Gunawan (1:02.11); Glenn Victor Sutanto (53.61); Triady Fauzi Sidiq (49.97)	DSQ	
