= Swimming at the 2025 SEA Games – Women's 50 metre backstroke =

Women's 50 metre backstroke at the 2025 SEA Games
- Venue: SAT Swimming Pool
- Date: 11 December
- Competitors: 14 from 7 nations
- Winning time: 28.80

Medalists
gold medal	Masniari Wolf	Indonesia
silver medal	Kayla Sanchez	Philippines
bronze medal	Saovanee Boonamphai	Thailand

The women's 50 metre backstroke event at the 2025 SEA Games took place on 11 December 2025 at the SAT Swimming Pool in Bangkok, Thailand.

== Schedule ==
All times are Indochina Standard Time (UTC+07:00)

Date	Time	Event
Thursday, 11 December 2025	9:06	Heats
Thursday, 11 December 2025	18:04	Final

== Records ==
Prior to this competition, the existing world, Asian and Games records were as follows.

World Record	Kaylee McKeown (AUS)	26.86	Budapest, Hungary	20 October 2023
Asian Record	Liu Xiang (CHN)	26.98	Jakarta, Indonesia	21 August 2018
Games Record	Masniari Wolf (INA)	28.89	Phnom Penh, Cambodia	7 May 2023

== Results ==
=== Heats ===
Rank	Heat	Lane	Swimmer	Nationality	Time	Notes
1	2	4	Kayla Sanchez	Philippines	28.47	Q, GR, NR
2	2	5	Masniari Wolf	Indonesia	29.20	Q
3	1	5	Saovanee Boonamphai	Thailand	29.28	Q
4	2	3	Quendy Fernandez	Philippines	29.48	Q
5	1	4	Flairene Candrea	Indonesia	29.53	Q
6	1	6	Levenia Sim	Singapore	29.54	Q
7	1	3	Chong Xin Lin	Malaysia	29.61	Q
8	2	6	Mia Millar	Thailand	29.84	Q
9	2	2	Vivian Tee Xin Ling	Malaysia	30.22	R
10	1	2	Julia Yeo Shu Ning	Singapore	30.26	R
11	2	7	Oo Nan Honey	Myanmar	30.88	NR
12	2	8	Yan Htet Wun	Myanmar	34.27	
13	1	7	Tamsiri Christine Niyomxay	Laos	36.64	
14	2	1	Thipthida Chantha	Laos	37.89	

=== Final ===
Rank	Lane	Swimmer	Nationality	Time	Notes
1st place, gold medalist(s)	5	Masniari Wolf	Indonesia	28.80	NR
2nd place, silver medalist(s)	4	Kayla Sanchez	Philippines	28.84	
3rd place, bronze medalist(s)	3	Saovanee Boonamphai	Thailand	28.84	NR
4	2	Flairene Candrea	Indonesia	28.98	
5	1	Chong Xin Lin	Malaysia	29.47	
6	6	Quendy Fernandez	Philippines	29.53	
7	7	Levenia Sim	Singapore	29.86	
8	8	Mia Millar	Thailand	29.93	
