= Swimming at the 2013 SEA Games – Women's 4 × 100 metre freestyle relay =

The Women's 4 x 100 metre freestyle relay event at the 2013 SEA Games took place on 13 December 2013 at Wunna Theikdi Aquatics Centre.

There were 5 teams who took part in this event. Thailand won the gold medal, Singapore and Indonesia won the silver and bronze medal respectively.

== Schedule ==
All times are Myanmar Standard Time (UTC+06:30)

Date	Time	Event
Thursday, 13 December 2013	18:56	Final

== Records ==
Prior to this competition, the existing world, Asian, and Southeast Asian Games records were as follows.

World Record	Netherlands	3:31.72	Rome, Italy	26 July 2009
Asian Record	China	3:35.63	Rome, Italy	26 July 2009
Games Record	Singapore	3:45.73	Vientiane, Laos	11 December 2009

== Results ==
Rank	Lane	Team	Time	Notes
1st place, gold medalist(s)	2	Thailand (THA)	3:47.66	
		Jenjira Risa Ard	57.73	
		Patarawadee Kittiya	57.77	
		Benjaporn Sriphanomthorn	56.36	
		Natthanan Junkrajang	55.80	
2nd place, silver medalist(s)	6	Singapore (SIN)	3:49.00	
		Quah Ting Wen	56.91	
		Amanda Lim	57.40	
		Mylene Ong	57.13	
		Lynette Lim	57.56	
3rd place, bronze medalist(s)	4	Indonesia (INA)	3:55.28	
		Ressa Kania Dewi	58.06	
		Kathriana Mella Gustianjani	59.02	
		Raina Saumi Grahana Ramdhani	58.95	
		Patricia Yosita Hapsari	59.25	
4	5	Malaysia (MAS)	4:06.35	
		Yap Siew Hui	1:00.72	
		Erika Kong	1:00.29	
		Nadia Adrianna Redza Goh	1:01.88	
		Khoo Cai Lin	1:03.46	
5	3	Myanmar (MYA)	4:18.98	
		Su Moe Theint San	1:03.80	
		Ei Ei Thet	1:03.89	
		Khant Khant Su San	1:06.88	
		K Zin Win	1:04.41	
