= Swimming at the 2013 SEA Games – Men's 4 × 200 metre freestyle relay =

The Men's 4 x 200 metre freestyle relay event at the 2013 SEA Games took place on 12 December 2013 at Wunna Theikdi Aquatics Centre.

There were 5 teams who took part in this event. Singapore won the gold medal, Malaysia and Indonesia won the silver and bronze medal respectively.

== Schedule ==
All times are Myanmar Standard Time (UTC+06:30)

Date	Time	Event
Thursday, 12 December 2013	18:54	Final

== Records ==
Prior to this competition, the existing world, Asian, and Southeast Asian Games records were as follows.

World Record	United States	6:58.55	Rome, Italy	31 July 2009
Asian Record	Japan	7:02.26	Rome, Italy	31 July 2009
Games Record	Singapore	7:30.73	Vientiane, Laos	10 December 2009

== Results ==
Rank	Lane	Nation	Swimmers	Time	Notes
1st place, gold medalist(s)	6	Singapore (SIN)	Joseph Schooling (1:50.86); Danny Yeo (1:50.72); Pang Sheng Jun (1:53.17); Quah Zheng Wen (1:51.92)	7:26.67	GR
2nd place, silver medalist(s)	5	Malaysia (MAS)	Lim Ching Hwang (1:52.32); Kevin Yeap (1:52.50); Daniel Bego (1:49.92); Welson Sim (1:52.58)	7:27.32	
3rd place, bronze medalist(s)	4	Indonesia (INA)	Triady Fauzi Sidiq (1:50.46); Putera Muhammad Randa (1:55.96); Alexis Wijaya Ohmar (1:53.63); Ricky Anggawijaya (1:55.08)	7:35.13	
4	2	Thailand (THA)	Tanakrit Kattiya (1:54.44); Sarit Tiewong (1:52.11); Seree Phansomboon (1:55.45); Jiarapong Sangkhawat (1:55.62)	7:37.62	
5	3	Myanmar (MYA)	Ye Myint Hein (2:01.75); Min Thu Kha (2:04.31); Myat Thu Oo (2:10.04); Win Htet Oo (2:01.34)	8:17.44	
