= Swimming at the 2025 SEA Games – Women's 50 metre butterfly =

Women's 50 metre butterfly at the 2025 SEA Games
- Venue: SAT Swimming Pool
- Date: 15 December
- Competitors: 13 from 8 nations
- Winning time: 26.42

Medalists
| gold medal | Quah Ting Wen | Singapore |
| silver medal | Miranda Cristina Renner | Philippines |
| bronze medal | Jenjira Srisa-ard | Thailand |

The women's 50 metre butterfly event at the 2025 SEA Games took place on 15 December 2025 at the SAT Swimming Pool in Bangkok, Thailand.

== Schedule ==
All times are Indochina Standard Time (UTC+07:00)

| Date | Time | Event |
|---|---|---|
| Monday, 15 December 2025 | 9:09 | Heats |
| Monday, 15 December 2025 | 18:00 | Final |

== Records ==
Prior to this competition, the existing world, Asian, and Southeast Asian Games records were as follows.

| World Record | Sarah Sjöström (SWE) | 24.43 | Borås, Sweden | 5 July 2014 |
| Asian Record | Zhang Yufei (CHN) | 25.05 | Fukuoka, Japan | 29 July 2023 |
| Games Record | Quah Ting Wen (SGP) | 26.50 | Capas, Philippines | 7 December 2019 |

== Results ==
=== Heats ===
| Rank | Heat | Lane | Swimmer | Nationality | Time | Notes |
|---|---|---|---|---|---|---|
| 1 | 2 | 4 | Quah Ting Wen | Singapore | 26.90 | Q |
| 2 | 1 | 4 | Quah Jing Wen | Singapore | 27.23 | Q |
| 3 | 1 | 5 | Miranda Cristina Renner | Philippines | 27.29 | Q |
| 4 | 1 | 2 | Lim Shun Qi | Malaysia | 28.10 | Q |
| 5 | 1 | 3 | Phạm Thị Vân | Vietnam | 28.24 | Q |
| 6 | 2 | 7 | Nadia Aisha Nurazmi | Indonesia | 28.64 | Q |
| 7 | 1 | 6 | Adelia Chantika Aulia | Indonesia | 28.75 | Q |
| 8 | 2 | 5 | Jenjira Srisa-Ard | Thailand | 28.89 | Q |
| 9 | 1 | 7 | Oo Nan Honey | Myanmar | 29.34 | R |
| 10 | 2 | 6 | Nguyễn Thúy Hiền | Vietnam | 30.66 | R |
| 11 | 1 | 1 | Thakhin Aung Phyo Thet | Myanmar | 33.50 | |
| 12 | 1 | 8 | Tamsiri Christine Niyomxay | Laos | 35.02 | |
| 13 | 2 | 1 | Thipthida Chantha | Laos | 35.10 | |
| – | 2 | 2 | Kamonluck Tungnapakorn | Thailand | DNS | |

=== Final ===
| Rank | Lane | Swimmer | Nationality | Time | Notes |
|---|---|---|---|---|---|
| 1st place, gold medalist(s) | 4 | Quah Ting Wen | Singapore | 26.42 | GR |
| 2nd place, silver medalist(s) | 3 | Miranda Cristina Renner | Philippines | 26.93 | NR |
| 3rd place, bronze medalist(s) | 1 | Jenjira Srisa-Ard | Thailand | 26.96 | |
| 4 | 5 | Quah Jing Wen | Singapore | 27.00 | |
| 5 | 2 | Phạm Thị Vân | Vietnam | 27.18 | NR |
| 6 | 6 | Lim Shun Qi | Malaysia | 28.19 | |
| 7 | 7 | Nadia Aisha Nurazmi | Indonesia | 28.21 | |
| 8 | 8 | Oo Nan Honey | Myanmar | 29.05 | NR |
