= Phone Pyae Han =

Burmese swimmer (born 2008)

Personal information
- Born: October 9, 2008 (age 17)

Sport
- Sport: Swimming

Phone Pyae Han (Burmese: ဘုန်းပြည့်ဟန်; born 9 October 2008) is a swimmer from Myanmar, selected to compete at the 2024 Summer Olympics.

== Early life ==
He is educated at the GESS International School in Singapore.

== Career ==
He was selected to compete for Myanmar at the 2024 Paris Olympics in the men's 100m freestyle. He was also chosen as flag bearer for the country at the parade of nations at the opening ceremony.
