= Amanda Lim =

Singaporean swimmer (born 1993)

Personal information
- Full name: Lim Xiang Qi Amanda
- Nationality: Singaporean
- Born: 8 January 1993 (age 33) Singapore
- Height: 171 cm (5 ft 7 in)
- Weight: 59 kg (130 lb)

Sport
- Sport: Swimming
- Strokes: Freestyle
- Club: Swimfast Aquatic Club
Medal record
Representing Singapore
Women's swimming
Event	1st	2nd	3rd
Asian Championships	0	0	1
Southeast Asian Games	13	5	2
Southeast Asian Championships	7	3	1
Asian Youth Games	1	2	1
Total	21	10	5
Asian Championships
Bronze medal – third place	2012 Dubai	50 m freestyle
Southeast Asian Games
Gold medal – first place	2009 Vientiane	50 m freestyle
Gold medal – first place	2009 Vientiane	4×100 m freestyle
Gold medal – first place	2009 Vientiane	4×200 m freestyle
Gold medal – first place	2011 Palembang	50 m freestyle
Gold medal – first place	2011 Palembang	4×100 m freestyle
Gold medal – first place	2011 Palembang	4×200 m freestyle
Gold medal – first place	2011 Palembang	4×100 m medley
Gold medal – first place	2013 Naypyidaw	50 m freestyle
Gold medal – first place	2013 Naypyidaw	4×200 m freestyle
Gold medal – first place	2013 Naypyidaw	4×100 m medley
Gold medal – first place	2015 Singapore	50 m freestyle
Gold medal – first place	2017 Kuala Lumpur	50 m freestyle
Gold medal – first place	2019 New Clark City	50 m freestyle
Gold medal – first place	2021 Vietnam	4×100 m freestyle
Gold medal – first place	2023 Cambodia	4x100 m freestyle
Gold medal – first place	2025 Thailand	50 m freestyle
Silver medal – second place	2007 Nakhon Ratchasima	4×200 m freestyle
Silver medal – second place	2011 Palembang	200 m freestyle
Silver medal – second place	2013 Naypyidaw	4×100 m freestyle
Silver medal – second place	2021 Vietnam	50 m freestyle
Silver medal – second place	2023 Cambodia	50 m freestyle
Bronze medal – third place	2009 Vientiane	100 m freestyle
Bronze medal – third place	2011 Palembang	100 m freestyle
Southeast Asian Championships
Gold medal – first place	2012 Singapore	50 m freestyle
Gold medal – first place	2012 Singapore	200 m freestyle
Gold medal – first place	2012 Singapore	4×100 m freestyle
Gold medal – first place	2012 Singapore	4×200 m freestyle
Gold medal – first place	2014 Singapore	50 m freestyle
Gold medal – first place	2014 Singapore	200 m freestyle
Silver medal – second place	2014 Singapore	4×100 m freestyle
Silver medal – second place	2014 Singapore	4×200 m freestyle
Silver medal – second place	2014 Singapore	4×100 m medley
Bronze medal – third place	2014 Singapore	100 m freestyle
Asian Youth Games
Gold medal – first place	2009 Singapore	4×100 m freestyle
Silver medal – second place	2009 Singapore	50 m freestyle
Silver medal – second place	2009 Singapore	100 m freestyle
Bronze medal – third place	2009 Singapore	4×100 m medley

Amanda Lim (born Lim Xiang Qi on 8 January 1993) is a Singaporean freestyle swimmer.

== Education ==
Lim was educated at the Singapore Sports School, receiving the Singapore Pools Sports Excellence Scholarship in 2006. In 2011, Lim graduated with a diploma in sports management and exercise science under an arrangement between the school and the Auckland University of Technology. She then studied sports science and management at the Nanyang Technological University.

== Career ==
=== 2007–2009 ===
Lim first competed for Singapore at the 2007 Hong Kong International Open, where, aged just 14, she finished 7th in the heats of the 50-metre freestyle in 27.94, 7th in the heats of the 100-metre freestyle in 1:00.17, 7th in the heats of the 200-metre freestyle in 2:12.35 and withdrew from the 400-metre freestyle. She was denied a place in the final in these events as the rules for the meet stipulated that the maximum number of the competitors from each country was limited to two. Lim also swam in the heats of the 4 × 100-metre freestyle relay with Mylene Ong, Ruth Ho and Lynette Lim, setting the fastest qualifying time of 4:06.03. In the final, Lim and Lynette were replaced with Quah Ting Wen and Tao Li who won gold in a new championship record time of 3:56.58.

At the Singaporean leg of the 2007 FINA Swimming World Cup, Lim finished 5th in the 400-metre freestyle in 4:23.10, 7th in the 200-metre freestyle in 2:04.89, 12th in the 50-metre freestyle in 26.95 and 13th in the 100-metre freestyle in 58.31.

At the 2007 Southeast Asian Games in Nakhon Ratchasima, Thailand, Lim won silver in the 4 × 200-metre freestyle relay alongside Lynette Lim, Mylene Ong and Quah Ting Wen in a national record time of 8:26.23.

At the 2008 FINA Youth World Swimming Championships in Monterrey, Mexico, Lim finished equal 23rd in the 50-metre freestyle in 27.18, 24th in the 400-metre freestyle in 4:30.28, 28th in the 800-metre freestyle in 9:17.37, 31st in the 200-metre freestyle in 2:07.63, 32nd in the 100-metre freestyle in 59.70 and in the 4 × 100-metre medley relay, Lim with Shana Lim, Ru'en Ho and Koh Ting Ting finished 11th in 4:26.56.

At the Singaporean leg of the 2008 FINA Swimming World Cup, Lim finished 4th in the 400-metre freestyle in 4:18.05, 5th in the 800-metre freestyle in 8:59.49, 9th in the 200-metre freestyle in 2:03.87, 10th in the 50-metre freestyle in 26.33 and 12th in the 100-metre freestyle in 57.77.

In July 2009 at the inaugural Asian Youth Games held in Singapore, Lim won a four medals – a gold, two silver and a bronze. In the 50-metre freestyle, Lim set a new national record of 25.38 in the semi-finals, breaking the Quah Ting Wen's mark of 25.65, set at the National Championships a month prior. Lim's time also bettered Quah's championship record which was set in the heats. In the final, Lim won the silver behind Quah but retained the national and meet record, with Quah's winning time 0.16 seconds slower than Lim's semi-final time. In the 100-metre freestyle, Lim again won silver finishing behind Quah who won the event in a new national record time. In the relays, Lim teamed up with Quah, Koh Hui Yu and Lynette Lim to win gold in the 4 × 100-metre freestyle in a new national record time of 3:46.91, eclipsing the mark set at the 2006 Asian Games by over six seconds and in 4 × 100-metre medley relay, Lim with Quah, Lynette Lim and Roanne Ho won bronze in a time of 4:13.34.

One month later at the 2009 World Aquatics Championships in Rome, Lim finished equal 30th in the 50-metre freestyle in 25.70, 59th in the 100-metre freestyle in 56.95 and 45th in the 200-metre freestyle in 2:03.89. In the relays, Lim with Quah Ting Wen, Lynette Lim and Mylene Ong finished 19th in the 4 × 100-metre freestyle in 3:47.54 and in the 4 × 200-metre freestyle the same quartet finished 16th in 8:09.91, smashing the national record they set 20 months earlier by over 16 seconds.

At the 2009 Hong Kong International Open, Lim won three gold medals and a silver. She took out the 50-metre freestyle in a new meet record time of 26.14, the 100-metre freestyle in 57.33, another new meet record and the 800-metre freestyle where she tied with Hong Kong's Natasha Tang with both posting a time of 9:04.03. In the 4 × 100-metre freestyle relay Lim, Mylene Ong and Koh Ting Ting gave Samantha Yeo a lead of over 2 seconds in the final changeover but the South China Athletic Association team's anchor Jennifer Town swam down Yeo to win the relay by 0.46 seconds. Both teams swam under the meet record of 3:56.58, set by the Singaporean quartet of Ruth Ho, Quah, Tao and Ong at the 2007 Open. In her other events, Lim finished 6th in the 50-metre butterfly in 29.99 and team of Lim, Tao, Yeo and Koh were disqualified in the heats of the 4 × 100-metre medley relay.

At the second leg of the 2009 FINA Swimming World Cup in Moscow, Lim finished 11th in the 50-metre freestyle in 25.38, 12th in the 200-metre freestyle in 2:00.53 and 19th in the 100-metre freestyle in 55.88. At the third leg in Stockholm, Lim finished 29th in the 50-metre freestyle in 25.59 and 43rd in the 100-metre freestyle in 56.06. At the fourth leg in Berlin, Lim finished 27th in the 400-metre freestyle in 4:17.30, 35th in the 200-metre freestyle in 2:01.73, 37th in the 50-metre freestyle in 25.75, 40th in the 100-metre freestyle in 55.84 and 44th in the 50-metre butterfly in 29.28. At the fifth and final leg in Singapore, Lim finished 7th in 100-metre freestyle in 55.67, 7th in 200-metre freestyle in 2:03.02 and was disqualified in 50-metre freestyle.

Lim closed out the year by winning three gold medals and a bronze at the 2009 Southeast Asian Games in Vientiane, Laos. In the 50-metre freestyle, Lim won gold in a new Games record time of 25.82. In her other individual events, Lim won bronze the 100-metre freestyle in 56.60 and finished 5th in the 200-metre freestyle in 2:04.09. In the 4 × 200-metre freestyle relay, Lim with Quah, Lynette Lim and Mylene Ong won gold in 8:11.75, smashing the Games record set by Thailand in 2007 by over nine seconds and in the 4 × 100-metre freestyle relay, the same foursome won gold in 3:45.73, breaking the meet and national records by 4.13 and 1.18 seconds, respectively. Lim said of her results: "I am very happy, relieved and honoured. This is my first individual SEA Games gold medal. A lot of people have been very supportive of me."

=== 2010–2012 ===
At the 2010 Youth Olympics in Singapore, Lim finished 6th in the 50-metre freestyle in a season best time of 26.05, 11th in the 100-metre freestyle in 57.99, 13th in the 200-metre freestyle in 2:04.68 and 16th in the 50-metre butterfly in 29.34. In the 4 × 100-metre freestyle relay, Lim with Adeline Winata, Chriselle Koh and Cheryl Lim finished 8th in 4:00.43 and in the 4 × 100-metre medley relay, the same quartet finished 10th in the 4 × 100-metre medley relay in 4:28.56. In the mixed 4 × 100-metre freestyle relay, first ever mixed-gender relay for Olympic-level swimming, Lim with Winata, Clement Lim and Arren Quek finished 12th in 3:42.88.

At the 2010 Hong Kong International Open, Lim won three silver and one bronze medal. Lim was runner-up in the 50-metre freestyle in 26.42 and in the 200-metre freestyle in 2:05.05. Lim won her bronze in the 400-metre freestyle in 4:24.52 and finished 6th in the heats of the 100-metre freestyle event in 58.20 but withdrew from final. The team of Lim, Koh Hui Yu, Lynette Ng and Mylene Ong won silver in the 4 × 100-metre freestyle relay in 3:54.25, finishing 2.44 seconds behind the Thailand quartet of Benjaporn Sriphanomthorn, Natsaya Susuk, Rutai Santadvatana and Natthanan Junkrajang. Both teams swam under the meet record of 3:55.12. In the 4 × 100-metre medley relay, Lim with Koh Hui Yu, Cheryl Lim and Meagan Lim placed second in the heats of the 4 × 100-metre medley relay in 4:34.63, finishing behind the other Singaporean quartet of Lynette Ng, Samantha Yeo, Tao Li and Mylene Ong. In the final, the latter of the quartets won gold in 4:21.29.

At the third leg of the 2010 FINA Swimming World Cup in Singapore, Lim finished 5th in the 200-metre freestyle in 2:01.14 and 10th in the 50-metre freestyle in 25.92.

At the 2010 Asian Games in Guangzhou, China, Lim finished 8th in the 50-metre freestyle in 26.15. In the 4 × 200-metre freestyle relay, Lim with Quah Ting Wen, Lynette Lim and Mylene Ong finished 5th in 8:16.47, the third best performance in Singapore's history at the time and in the 4 × 100-metre freestyle relay, Lim with Quah, Ong and Koh Hui Yu finished 5th in 3:49.17.

At the 2011 World Aquatics Championships in Shanghai, Lim finished 30th in the 50-metre freestyle in 26.12 and 39th in the 100-metre freestyle in 57.00.

At the fifth leg of the 2011 FINA Swimming World Cup in Singapore, Lim finished 7th in the 50-metre freestyle in 25.44 and 11th in the 200-metre freestyle in 2:00.77.

At the 2011 Southeast Asian Games in Palembang, Indonesia, Lim won six medals including four gold. In the 50-metre freestyle, Lim won gold in 25.77, lowering her own games record, won silver in the 200-metre freestyle in a season's best time of 2:03.02 and won bronze in the 100-metre freestyle in 56.73. In the team events, Singapore won all three female relays – repeating their performance of two years prior. The quartet of Lim, Mylene Ong, Koh Hui Yu and Tao Li took out the 4 × 100-metre freestyle relay in 3:48.38 and the 4 × 200-metre freestyle relay in 8:13.88, whilst Lim, Tao, Shana Lim and Samantha Yeo won the 4 × 100-metre medley relay in 4:11.27.

At the inaugural Southeast Asian Swimming Championships in Singapore, Lim won four gold medals. She won the 50-metre freestyle in a season best time of 25.71 and the 200-metre freestyle in new personal best time of 2:02.76. In the 4 × 100-metre freestyle relay, Lim with Mylene Ong, Koh Hui Yu and Teo Jing Wen won gold in 3:49.25 and Lim with Koh, Teo and Marina Chan won gold in the 4 × 200-metre freestyle relay in 8:21.67. As this was the inaugural event, all four times were also championship records.

At the fourth leg of the 2012 FINA Swimming World Cup in Moscow, Lim finished 12th in the 50-metre freestyle in 25.95, 14th in the 200-metre freestyle in 2:01.51, 16th in the 100-metre freestyle in 56.64 and 20th in the 100-metre individual medley in 1:05.98. In the mixed 4 × 50-metre medley relay, Lim with Danny Yeo, Lionel Khoo and Mylene Ong finished 9th in 1:49.04 and in the mixed 4 × 50-metre freestyle relay, Lim with Ong, Khoo and Jeremy Mathews finished 4th in 1:35.81. At the eighth and final leg in Singapore, Lim finished 6th in the 200-metre freestyle in 2:00.67, 7th in the 100-metre freestyle in 55.43 and 9th in the 50-metre freestyle in 25.76. In the mixed 4 × 50-metre freestyle relay, Lim with Ong, Yeo and Arren Quek won bronze with a time of 1:35.55 and in the heats of mixed 4 × 50-metre medley relay, the team of Lim, Meagan Lim, Joel Tan and Jerryl Yong was disqualified.

At the 2012 Asian Swimming Championships in Dubai, Lim won bronze in the 50-metre freestyle in 26.17 and finished in 11th in the heats of the 200-metre freestyle in 2:07.31. She teamed up with Marina Chan, Koh Hui Yu and Teo Jing Wen to finish 4th in the 4 × 200-metre freestyle relay in 8:35.92, in the 4 × 100-metre freestyle relay, Lim with Chan, Koh and Mylene Ong finished 4th in 3:52.51 and in the 4 × 100-metre medley relay, Lim with Ong, Tao Li and Samantha Yeo finished 4th in 4:22.35.

At the 2012 FINA World Swimming Championships (25 m) in Istanbul, Turkey, Lim finished 32nd in the 50-metre freestyle in 25.75, 40th in the 100-metre freestyle in 56.16, 46th in the 200-metre freestyle in 2:03.32, and in the 4 × 100-metre freestyle relay Lim with Mylene Ong, Lynette Ng and Samantha Yeo finished 12th in 3:50.57.

=== 2013–present ===
At the 2013 World Aquatics Championships in Barcelona, Lim finished 29th in the 50-metre freestyle in 25.86. In the relays, Lim with Lynette Lim, Mylene Ong and Quah Ting Wen finished 14th in the 4 × 100-metre freestyle in 3:48.85; the same foursome finished 12th in the 4 × 200-metre freestyle in 8:15.91 and Lim with Quah, Tao Li and Samantha Yeo finished 15th in the 4 × 100-metre medley in 4:10.69.

At the first leg of the 2013 FINA Swimming World Cup in Eindhoven, Lim finished 18th in the 200-metre freestyle in 2:02.02, 19th in the 50-metre freestyle in 25.55, 19th in the 100-metre freestyle in 55.34 and 24th in the 50-metre butterfly in 29.37. At the second leg in Berlin, Lim finished 19th in the 50-metre freestyle in 25.46, 19th in the 100-metre freestyle in 55.41 and 20th in the 100-metre individual medley in 1:06.26. At the sixth leg in Singapore, Lim finished 11th in the 400-metre freestyle in 4:24.75, 14th in the 200-metre freestyle in 2:02.03, 18th in the 50-metre freestyle in 25.88 and 20th in the 100-metre freestyle in 56.98. In the mixed 4 × 50-metre medley relay, Lim with Quah Zheng Wen, Christopher Cheong and Tao Li finished 7th in 1:44.94 and in the mixed 4 × 50-metre freestyle relay, Lim with Darren Lim, Russell Ong and Mylene Ong finished 5th in 1:35.73.

Lim closed out the year by winning four medals at the 2013 Southeast Asian Games in Naypyidaw, Burma. In the 50-metre freestyle, Lim, the two-time champion, defended her title again and lowered her games record to 25.69. In her other individual event, Lim finished fourth in the 100-metre freestyle in 56.85. In the 4 × 200-metre freestyle relay, Lim with Quah Ting Wen, Lynette Lim and Tao Li won gold in 8:13.99. The time was slower than the national open and Games records of 8:09.91 and 8:11.75 set in 2009, but is the second fastest since the 2010 banning of non-textile swimsuits. In the 4 × 100-metre medley relay, Lim with Tao, Samantha Yeo and Quah Ting Wen won gold in 4:13.02. Lim's 56.20-second freestyle split was the fastest in textile swimsuits since Joscelin Yeo's 56.03 and 56.19 in 2001 and 2005 respectively. Lim fourth medal was a silver in the 4 × 100-metre freestyle relay with Quah, Mylene Ong and Lynette Lim in 3:49.00. Finishing 1.34 seconds behind Thailand, the national open record of 3:45.73 and textile-best time of 3:48.38 remained intact.

At the 2014 Southeast Asian Swimming Championships in Singapore, Lim won six medals and defended her two titles. She won gold in the 50-metre freestyle in 25.74, 0.03 seconds off her meet record, gold in the 200 freestyle in 2:03.98, and bronze in the 100-metre freestyle in 57.23. In the relays, Lim won silver in the 4 × 100-metre freestyle relay in 3:50.88 alongside Hoong En Qi, Rachel Tseng and Marina Chan, silver in the 4 × 200-metre freestyle relay in 8:26.91 with Chan, Tseng and Christie Chue and silver in the 4 × 100-metre medley relay in 4:26.53 with Chan, Samantha Yeo and Tan Jing-E.

One month later at the 2014 Commonwealth Games in Glasgow, Lim finished in 14th in the 50-metre freestyle in 25.93, 19th in the 100-metre freestyle in 57.78 and 21st in the 200-metre freestyle in 2:06.24. In the relays, Lim teamed up with Marina Chan, Lynette Lim and Quah Ting Wen to finish 7th in the final of the 4 × 100-metre freestyle in 3:49.69 and in the 4 × 200-metre freestyle, the same quartet also finished 7th in the final in 8:16.39.

At the inaugural Singapore Swim Stars event, Lim finished ninth in the 50-metre freestyle in 25.66.

At the 2014 Asian Games in Incheon, South Korea, Lim finished 7th in the 50-metre freestyle in 25.73, 11th in the 100-metre freestyle in 57.12 and 11th in the 200-metre freestyle in 2:03.89. In the relays, Lim with Marina Chan, Quah Ting Wen and Lynette Lim finished 5th in the 4 × 100-metre freestyle relay in 3:47.62, in the 4 × 200-metre freestyle relay, Lim with Lynette Lim, Quah and Rachel Tseng finished 5th in 8:12.09 and in the 4 × 100-metre medley relay, Lim with Quah, Tao and Samantha Yeo finished 4th in 4:11.77.

At the 2025 SEA Games, Lim made history by becoming a 7-time gold medallist in the Women's 50m Freestyle. She has won this event at six editions of the Games consecutively from 2009-2019, she came in 2nd in 2021 and 2023, before subsequently reclaiming her throne in 2025 at her 10th outing. She also dedicated her gold medal to her late father.

== Awards ==
Lim was named Sportsgirl of the Year at the Singapore National Olympic Council's 2012 Singapore Sports Awards. In September 2013, Lim was one of 66 recipients of the inaugural Sports Excellence Scholarship awarded by the High Performance Sports Steering Committee. The scholarship provides education support for student athletes, personal and life-skill development as well as financial support to fully realise athletes aspirations and their competitive potential.

== Personal life ==
In 2022, Lim was investigated for consumption of cannabis by Central Narcotics Bureau (CNB). She was given a stern warning by CNB and subsequently apologised for the incident.

Lim's father died in September 2025.
