= Swimming at the 2013 SEA Games – Women's 4 × 200 metre freestyle relay =

The Women's 4 x 200 metre freestyle relay event at the 2013 SEA Games took place on 12 December 2013 at Wunna Theikdi Aquatics Centre.

There were 5 teams who took part in this event. Singapore won the gold medal, Indonesia and Myanmar won the silver and bronze medal respectively.

== Schedule ==
All times are Myanmar Standard Time (UTC+06:30)

| Date | Time | Event |
|---|---|---|
| Thursday, 12 December 2013 | 19:23 | Final |

== Records ==
Prior to this competition, the existing world, Asian, and Southeast Asian Games records were as follows.

| World Record | China | 7:42.08 | Rome, Italy | 30 July 2009 |
| Asian Record | China | 7:42.08 | Rome, Italy | 30 July 2009 |
| Games Record | Singapore | 8:11.75 | Vientiane, Laos | 10 December 2009 |

== Results ==
| Rank | Lane | Team | Time | Notes |
|---|---|---|---|---|
| 1st place, gold medalist(s) | 6 | Singapore (SIN) | 8:13.99 | |
| | | Quah Ting Wen | 2:02.51 | |
| | | Lynette Lim | 2:02.79 | |
| | | Amanda Lim | 2:04.28 | |
| | | Tao Li | 2:04.41 | |
| 2nd place, silver medalist(s) | 4 | Indonesia (INA) | 8:43.80 | |
| | | Raina Saumi Grahana Ramdhani | 2:09.21 | |
| | | Kathriana Mella Gustianjani | 2:13.10 | |
| | | Patricia Yosita Hapsari | 2:14.66 | |
| | | Ressa Kania Dewi | 2:06.83 | |
| 3rd place, bronze medalist(s) | 3 | Myanmar (MYA) | 9:23.54 | |
| | | Khant Su San Khant | 2:19.37 | |
| | | Moe Theint San Su | 2:19.32 | |
| | | K Zin Win | 2:21.91 | |
| | | Ei Thet Ei | 2:22.94 | |
| - | 2 | Thailand (THA) | DSQ | |
| | | Benjaporn Sriphanomthorn | | |
| | | Phiangkhwan Pawapotako | | |
| | | Patarawadee Kittiya | | |
| | | Natthanan Junkrajang | | |
| - | 5 | Malaysia (MAS) | DNS | |
| | | - | | |
| | | - | | |
| | | - | | |
| | | - | | |
