= Phone Min Khant =

Burmese swimmer (born 2009)

Personal information
- Native name: ဘုန်းမင်းခန့်
- National team: Myanmar
- Born: January 29, 2009 (age 17) Yangon, Myanmar

Sport
- Sport: Swimming
- Club: Aqua King Myanmar Swimming Club
- Coach: Kazushi Nakayama (Japanese)

Phone Min Khant (Burmese: ဘုန်းမင်းခန့်; born 29 January 2009) is a competitive swimmer from Myanmar. He represented Myanmar at the 2025 SEA Games in Thailand.

== Early life and education ==
Phone Min Khant was born in Yangon, Myanmar. He attended the International Language & Business Centre (ILBC) in Yangon. He later continued his education at Northampton Community College as an online student. He was named to Northampton Community College's Dean's List for the Fall 2025 semester.

== Career ==
Phone Min Khant competes in swimming for Myanmar and Aqua King Myanmar Swimming Club. In 2024, he represented Myanmar at the 46th Southeast Asian Age Group Swimming Championships in Thailand. In 2025, he was selected to represent Myanmar at the 2025 SEA Games in Thailand. He subsequently competed for Myanmar in swimming at the 2025 SEA Games.
