= Pedro Henrique (footballer, born December 1992) =

Brazilian footballer

Personal information
- Full name: Pedro Henrique Pereira da Silva
- Date of birth: 18 December 1992 (age 33)
- Place of birth: Goiânia, Brazil
- Height: 1.90 m (6 ft 3 in)
- Position: Centre-back

Youth career
- Goiás

Senior career*
Years	Team	Apps	(Gls)
2010–2014	Goiás	43	(3)
2011	→ Cruzeiro-RS (loan)	1	(0)
2011	→ Trindade (loan)	4	(0)
2012	→ Aparecidense (loan)	20	(0)
2013	→ Aparecidense (loan)	2	(0)
2015	Cianorte		
2015	Vitória Guimarães B	8	(2)
2015–2022	Vitória Guimarães	129	(0)
2020–2021	→ Al-Wehda (loan)	16	(0)
2021	→ Atlético Goianiense (loan)	6	(0)
2022–2023	Lion City Sailors	21	(2)
2024–2025	Atlético Goianiense	35	(1)
- * Club domestic league appearances and goals as of 17 December 2025

Pedro Henrique Pereira da Silva (born 18 December 1992), known as Pedro Henrique or Pedrão, is a Brazilian professional footballer who plays as a centre-back.

== Club career ==
=== Early career ===
Pedro began his career in 2010 with Goiás. He was loaned to Trindade and twice to Aparecidense in the following years. With the departure of regulars from the squad, Pedrão was made a regular.

He was part of a Goiás defence which conceded just 40 goals in the 2014 Campeonato Brasileiro Série A season, less than numerous teams above them, including third-placed Internacional. He scored one goal in the season.

=== Vitória de Guimarães ===
He signed for Portuguese team Vitória de Guimarães in 2015 and has become a leader at the back, making over 100 appearances for the club.

=== Lion City Sailors ===
On 24 January 2022, Pedro came to Singapore to join the Lion City Sailors. In his first match for the club against Albirex Niigata (S), he won the 2022 Singapore Community Shield on 19 February 2022.

On 18 April 2022 during the 2022 AFC Champions League group stage match, he scored his first goal for the club in the famous 3-0 victory against Korean club, Daegu FC in which he scored a header from Shahdan Sulaiman crosses. A few days later, on 24 April, he scored another header goal against China club, Shandong Taishan. During the league match against Tampines Rovers on 9 October 2022, he suffered an ACL injury that ruled him out from the season and into 2023. In his first season, He gathered 4 goals and 1 assists in 28 appearances.

On 26 July 2023, Pedro returns to the starting line up after 9 Months out due to injury to face Tottenham Hotspurs in a friendly match at the Singapore National Stadium. On 15 December 2023, Lion City Sailors announced that Pedro will leave the club at the end of the 2023 season.

=== Atlético Goianiense ===
On 1 January 2024, Pedro returned home and signed with Atlético Goianiense. He made his second debut for the club on 19 January playing the full match during the Campeonato Goiano fixture against Morrinhos in a 1–0 win.

== Career statistics ==
=== Club ===
As of 25 May 2022

Club	Season	League			Cup		Continental		Total	
Club	Season	Division	Apps	Goals	Apps	Goals	Apps	Goals	Apps	Goals
Aparecidense	2012	Série D	8	0	0	0	12	0	20	0
Aparecidense	2013	Série D	2	0	0	0	0	0	2	0
Aparecidense	Total		10	0	0	0	12	0	22	0
Goiás	2013	Série A	2	1	0	0	2	0	4	1
Goiás	2014	Série A	23	0	0	0	15	2	38	2
Goiás	2015	Série A	0	0	0	0	0	0	0	0
Goiás	Total		25	1	0	0	17	2	42	3
Vitória B	2015–16	LigaPro	8	2	0	0	0	0	10	2
Vitória	2015–16	Primeira Liga	19	0	1	0	0	0	20	0
Vitória	2016–17	Primeira Liga	33	0	5	0	2	0	40	0
Vitória	2017–18	Primeira Liga	21	0	1	0	4	1	26	1
Vitória	2018–19	Primeira Liga	32	0	3	0	7	0	42	0
Vitória	2019–20	Primeira Liga	24	0	3	0	0	0	27	0
Vitória	Total		129	0	15	2	11	1	155	3
Al-Wehda	2020–21	Saudi Professional League	16	0	1	0	0	0	17	0
Atlético Goianiense	2021	Série A	6	0	0	0	0	0	6	0
Lion City Sailors	2022	Singapore Premier League	21	2	1	0	6	2	28	4
Lion City Sailors	2023	Singapore Premier League	0	0	0	0	0	0	0	0
Lion City Sailors	Total		21	2	1	0	6	2	28	4
Career total			215	5	17	2	46	5	278	12

== Honours ==
=== Club ===
Goiás

- Campeonato Goiano: 2013

Lion City Sailors

- Singapore Community Shield: 2022
- Singapore Cup: 2023

Atlético Goianiense

- Campeonato Goiano: 2024

=== Individual ===
- Singapore Premier League Team of the Year: 2022
