= Natthanan Junkrajang =

Thai swimmer (born 1986)

Personal information
- Native name: ณัฐฐานันท์ จันกระจ่าง
- National team: Thailand
- Born: 13 April 1986 (age 40) Sing Buri, Thailand

Sport
- Sport: Swimming
Medal record
Women's swimming
Representing Thailand
Event	1st	2nd	3rd
Asian Championships	0	0	1
Southeast Asian Games	15	19	9
Total	15	19	10
Asian Championships
Bronze medal – third place	2012 Dubai	400 m freestyle
Southeast Asian Games
Gold medal – first place	2005 Manila	4×100 m freestyle
Gold medal – first place	2005 Manila	4×200 m freestyle
Gold medal – first place	2007 Nakhon Ratchasima	100 m freestyle
Gold medal – first place	2007 Nakhon Ratchasima	200 m freestyle
Gold medal – first place	2007 Nakhon Ratchasima	4×100 m freestyle
Gold medal – first place	2007 Nakhon Ratchasima	4×200 m freestyle
Gold medal – first place	2009 Vientiane	400 m medley
Gold medal – first place	2011 Palembang	100 m freestyle
Gold medal – first place	2011 Palembang	200 m freestyle
Gold medal – first place	2011 Palembang	400 m freestyle
Gold medal – first place	2011 Palembang	200 m medley
Gold medal – first place	2011 Palembang	400 m medley
Gold medal – first place	2013 Naypyidaw	100 m freestyle
Gold medal – first place	2013 Naypyidaw	200 m freestyle
Gold medal – first place	2013 Naypyidaw	4×100 m freestyle
Silver medal – second place	2007 Nakhon Ratchasima	400 m freestyle
Silver medal – second place	2009 Vientiane	100 m freestyle
Silver medal – second place	2009 Vientiane	200 m freestyle
Silver medal – second place	2009 Vientiane	200 m medley
Silver medal – second place	2009 Vientiane	4×100 m freestyle
Silver medal – second place	2009 Vientiane	4×200 m freestyle
Silver medal – second place	2011 Palembang	800 m freestyle
Silver medal – second place	2011 Palembang	4×100 m freestyle
Silver medal – second place	2013 Naypyidaw	50 m freestyle
Silver medal – second place	2013 Naypyidaw	4×100 m medley
Silver medal – second place	2015 Singapore	200 m freestyle
Silver medal – second place	2015 Singapore	4×100 m freestyle
Silver medal – second place	2015 Singapore	4×200 m freestyle
Silver medal – second place	2015 Singapore	4×100 m medley
Silver medal – second place	2017 Kuala Lumpur	200 m freestyle
Silver medal – second place	2017 Kuala Lumpur	4×100 m freestyle
Silver medal – second place	2017 Kuala Lumpur	4×100 m medley
Silver medal – second place	2019 Philippines	200 m freestyle
Silver medal – second place	2019 Philippines	4×200 m freestyle
Bronze medal – third place	2005 Manila	4×100 m medley
Bronze medal – third place	2007 Nakhon Ratchasima	4×100 m medley
Bronze medal – third place	2009 Vientiane	4×100 m medley
Bronze medal – third place	2011 Palembang	4×100 m medley
Bronze medal – third place	2013 Naypyidaw	100 m backstroke
Bronze medal – third place	2017 Kuala Lumpur	400 m freestyle
Bronze medal – third place	2017 Kuala Lumpur	800 m freestyle
Bronze medal – third place	2019 Philippines	400 m freestyle
Bronze medal – third place	2019 Philippines	4×100 m freestyle

Natthanan Junkrajang (Thai: ณัฐฐานันท์ จันกระจ่าง; RTGS: Natthanan Chankrachang; born 13 April 1986 in Sing Buri, Thailand) is a Thai swimmer. At the 2008 Summer Olympics, she competed in the women's 100 and 200 m freestyle events. She competed at the 2012 Summer Olympics in the Women's 200 and 400 metre freestyle events, finishing 30th in the 200 m heats and 29th in the 400 m heats, failing to qualify for the final.
