= Win Htet Oo =

Burmese swimmer

Personal information
- Native name: ဝင်းထက်ဦး
- Nationality: Myanmar
- Born: Malaysia

Sport
- Sport: Swimming
- College team: New York University

Win Htet Oo (Burmese: ဝင်းထက်ဦး) is a Burmese swimmer.

== Early life and education ==
Win Htet Oo was born in Malaysia to Burmese parents. He attended International School Manila in Taguig, Philippines for his high school studies. He also studied at the New York University in the United States.

== Career ==
Win Htet Oo first took up swimming when he was six years old and grew up to be a professional swimmer. He represented Myanmar in international tournaments such as the 2013 and 2019 Southeast Asian Games. In 2017, he moved to Melbourne, Australia to get better training. He also held the national record for the 50 metres, 100 metres and 200 metre men's freestyle events. He also swam for the collegiate team of New York University.

At the 2019 Southeast Asian Games, he became eligible to compete in the 2020 Summer Olympics in Tokyo when he attained the Olympic Qualifying Time in the 50 metres freestyle event.

Following the 2021 Myanmar coup d'état, Win Htet Oo decided to forego competing in the 2020 Summer Olympics in April 2021 as a protest against the military junta which assumed power in Myanmar and after learning that the Myanmar Olympic Committee (MOC) fell under the military's control. In March 2021, he made a petition to the International Olympic Committee for the expulsion of the MOC from the Olympic movement and that athletes from Myanmar to be able to compete as neutral athletes, but both requests were denied. The IOC also remarked that "to the best of our knowledge" that Win Htet Oo has not been selected to be part of the Myanmar delegation at the Olympics.
