= German European School Singapore =

- Deutsche Europäische Schule Singapur

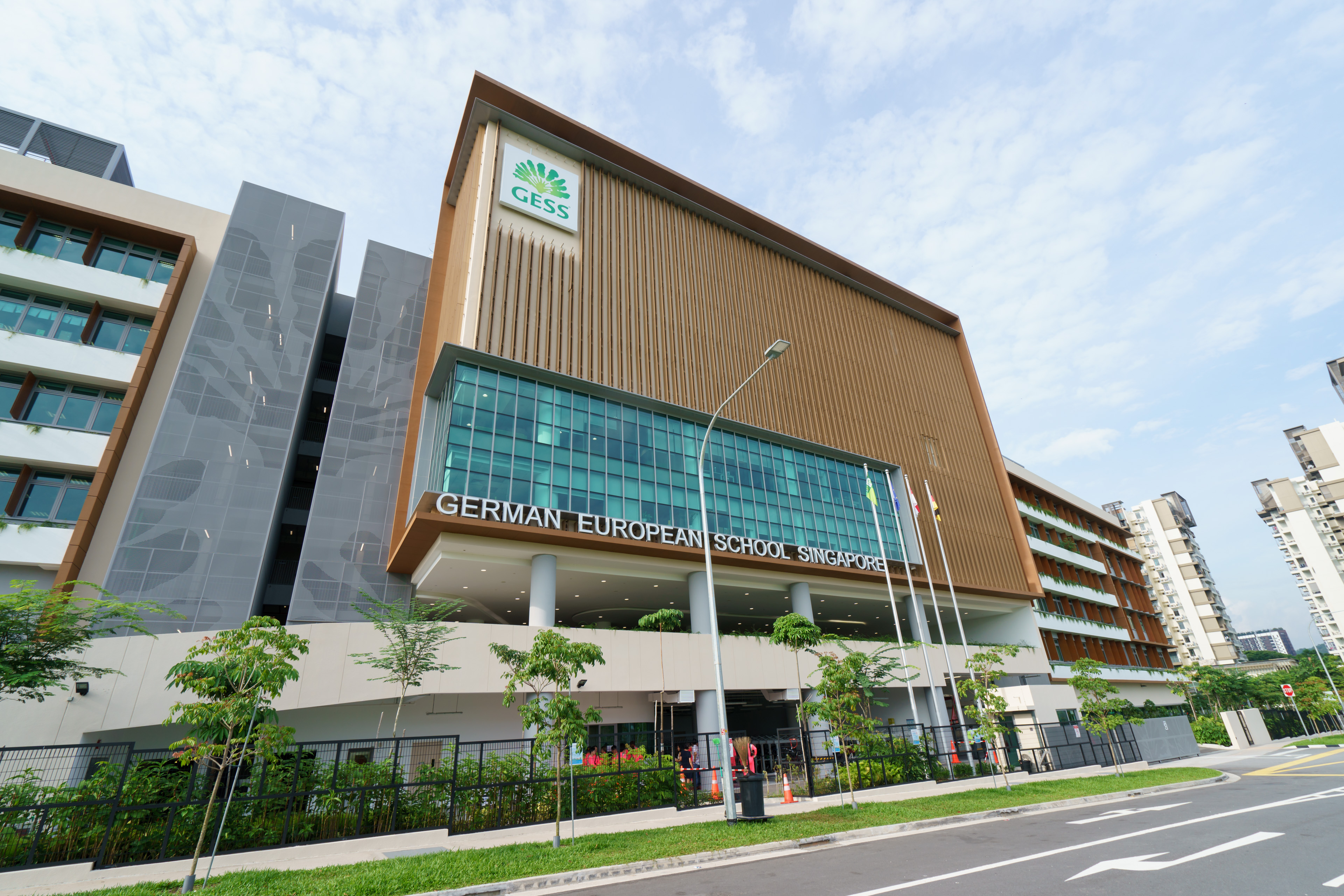

Location
- 2 Dairy Farm Lane; Singapore 677621; Singapore; 1.3659°N 103.7738°E

Information
- Type: Local school
- Motto: Freedom to grow
- Established: 25 August 1971; 55 years ago
- Principal: Ursula Voswinkel (Head of German International School)
- Principal: Joram Hutchins (Head of European International School)
- Years taught: Pre-K - Grade 12
- Gender: Co-educational
- Age range: 18 months to 18 years old
- Enrolment: 1650
- Average class size: 12-20 (Preschool), 24 (Primary to Secondary)
- Education system: International Baccalaureate and German Curriculum
- Language: English, German, French, Spanish, Latin, Mandarin, Dutch, Danish and Italian
- Hours in school day: 7 - 8.5
- Campus type: Urban
- Color: Green
- Song: Wings and Roots
- Athletics conference: ACSIS, ASAC, Won award of most Atheletic School in the world 2017
- Mascot: Gessy
- Team name: Wildcats
- Accreditation: IB, Council of international schools, DAS, DSD, WASC, PASCH, Exzellente Deutsche Auslandsschule, TASS, NOB
- Newspaper: Die Baumschule
- Website: https://www.gess.edu.sg/en/

GESS (German European School Singapore, German: Deutsche Europäische Schule Singapur) is an international, multi-lingual, co-educational school in Singapore. It was founded in 1971, and its student population is 1,650.

GESS operates in two school sections, the European International Baccalaureate school section and German International School Section. The European section offers all International Baccalaureate Programmes (PYP, MYP, DP, CP) in English. The German section of GESS offers all German school leaving certificates; it is a German government accredited "German School Abroad". The school is the largest "German School Abroad" in Asia.

== History ==
The first lessons at the German School were taught on 25 August 1971 with six students enrolled. In April 1972, a kindergarten and pre-school opened.

A new school building at 72 Bukit Tinggi Road was built.

In 2004, the German School decided to offer students tuition in English as well as German, and pursue accreditation with the International Baccalaureate Organization. As a result, its name was changed to German European School Singapore (GESS). The following school year, the European IB (English speaking) section of the school started teaching the IB curriculum for grades 1 to 12.

Growing student numbers led to the opening of a separate junior school campus at Jalan Jurong Kechil in August 2008, for grade 1 to 5 students.

In 2010, the pre-school department received accreditation to teach the Primary Years Programme IB curriculum, and GESS became a certified IB World School. In 2013, GESS was accredited by the Council of International Schools.

A new campus opened at Dairy Farm Lane in August 2018. The building cost about $135 million and the campus spans a 30,580 square meter site. It consolidated the preschool, primary school and secondary school campuses. The old main campus was sub-leased to Chatsworth International School. The land for the junior school campus was returned to the Singapore government.

== Academic programme ==
GESS offers academic programmes for pre-school, primary and secondary levels.

GESS operates in two school sections. The European International Baccalaureate section offers the IB Programme in English, and the German International School section uses the German language to teach all German school leaving certificates. GESS teaches both German and English language lessons at differing levels in both sections.

For a third language, the school teaches Mandarin, Latin, French, Spanish, English, Danish, Dutch, German and Italian.
