= Ei Ei Thet =

Burmese swimmer

Personal information
- Full name: Magdalena Ei Ei Thet
- Nationality: Burmese, Chin-Pa-Oh
- Born: 13 December 1992 (age 33) Yangon
- Height: 5 ft 4 in (163 cm)
- Weight: 143 lb (65 kg)

Sport
- Sport: Swimming
- Strokes: Freestyle, Butterfly and Breast Strokes.
- Club: Swimming Training for the Young people of Myanmar Swimming Federation
Medal record
Winner of Gold Medals and Silver Medals. Bronze Medals in Women's 200 meters with Freestyle in 27th SAE GAMES, Nay Pyi Taw, Myanmar 2013. Gold medal in Women's 50 meters Summer Olympic Games which was held in Brazil 2016.

Ei Ei Thet (born 13 December 1992) is a Burmese swimmer. She competed in the women's 50 metre freestyle event at the 2016 Summer Olympics, where she ranked 70th with a time of 30.25 seconds. She did not advance to the semifinals.

== Qualifications and Achievements ==
1. National Official Swimming Coach (Myanmar Swimming Federation)

2. International Olympic Technical Coach (FINA)

3. Multiple Gold Medals in different National Opens and National Age Group Competitions

4. The Best Player Award of the Year, (Continuously 5 Years in 10 Times competition)

5. Rio Olympics Games, Brazil, 2016

6. FINA World Championship, Istanbul - Turkey, 2012

7. Asian Games Triathlon Competition Phuket, Thailand (2014–15)

8. Asia University Games, Indonesia, (2015)

9. SEA AGE Group Swimming Competition, Thailand (2005–2006)

10. SEA Age Group Swimming Competition, Philippines

11. SEA Group Swimming Competition, Singapore

12. International Technical Swimming Training, Singapore

13. International Technical Swimming Training, China

14. National Opens Swimming Competitions, Gold Medals

15. National Triathlon, Yangon (Silver Medal)

16. Thai- Myanmar Friendly Match Swimming Competition 2006, Yangon, Bronze Medal

17. 27th SEA GAMES (2013) Nay Pyi Tay (Bronze Medal)

18. Completion of Swimming Technical Official Course by Ministry of Sports and Health, Myanmar Swimming Federation (MSF)

19. Technical Course for Coach and Referee in Swimming, Nay Pyi Taw, Myanmar, 2013

20. Course for Coach and Referee (3/2014) Ministry of Sports, Gold Camp, Nay Pyi Taw, 2014

21. Renewal Course for Coach and Referee (1/23) Gold Camp, Multiple Purpose Hall, Nay Pyi Taw, 2023
