= Equestrian at the 2013 SEA Games – Team dressage =

Team dressage equestrian at the 2013 Southeast Asian Games in Wunna Theikdi Equestrian Field, Naypyidaw, Myanmar on December 13, 2014.

Each horse and rider pair performed an FEI Grand Prix Test. The Grand Prix Test consists of a battery of required movements that each rider and horse pair performs. Five judges evaluate the pair, giving marks between 0 and 10 for each element. The judges' scores were averaged to give a final score for the pair. The best three scores from each team's four members were summed to give a team score. The results from this event also served as a qualifier for the individual dressage event.

== Schedule ==
All times are Myanmar Standard Time (UTC+06:30)

Date	Time	Event
Friday, 13 December 2013	09:00	Grand prix

== Results ==
Legend

- RT — Retired
- WD — Withdrawn
- EL — Eliminated
- NS — Not Started

Rank	Team	% Score
1st place, gold medalist(s)	Indonesia (INA)	205.929
	Erwin M. Yoga on Charrua	66.655
	Valentino Lumentah on Ngwe Lar May	67.517
	Alvaro Menayang on Billy	~~56.517~~
	Ferry Wahyu Hadiyanto on Perfecting Ruby	71.757
2nd place, silver medalist(s)	Myanmar (MYA)	197.309
	Aung Thu Tun on CP Safari	66.654
	Tun Aung Phyo on Front N Center	~~57.517~~
	Saw Maung on Bagan Minthamee	64.931
	Than Naing Aung on Sir Jerico	65.724
3rd place, bronze medalist(s)	Singapore (SIN)	190.551
	Catherine Yung Wen Oh on Oscar Royal	~~57.867~~
	Predrag Marjanovic on Rolex	65.413
	Natalie Pinruo Tan on Ma Lay Phyu	63.276
	Pei Jia Caroline Rosanna Chew on It's Mine	61.862
4	Malaysia (MAS)	187.343
	Edric Lee Chin Hon on Just A Snip	~~50.344~~
	Praveen Nair Mathavan on Sein Win Mal	68.206
	Shooredran Nageswaran on Tommy Gun	62.896
	Muhammad Shaiful Azwan on King	56.241
5	Thailand (THA)	180.206
	Dhe-Win Manathanya on CP Orego	59.586
	Nitipat Ngao Osa on Kinnordy Gyuana	57.551
	Pakjira Thongpakdi on Bundaruka Camego	~~EL~~
	H.R.H. Princess Sirivannavarinariratana on Htate Kwet	63.069
6	Cambodia (CAM)	159.896
	Sopharith Hoy on Kick And Kenny	~~44.965~~
	Sopheaktra Lon on Fast Track	49.931
	Puthminea Sor on Myanmar A Hla	54.793
	Narith Sim on Gunderman	55.172
