= Swimming at the 2013 SEA Games – Women's 800 metre freestyle =

The Women's 800 metre freestyle event at the 2013 SEA Games took place on 14 December 2013 at Wunna Theikdi Aquatics Centre.

There were 12 competitors from 6 countries who took part in this event. 8 swimmers with the fast qualifying time were in the fast heat, the others were in the slow heat. The final ranking was arranged by the times from both heats.

== Schedule ==
All times are Myanmar Standard Time (UTC+06:30)

Date	Time	Event
Thursday, 14 December 2013	09:23	Final 1
Thursday, 14 December 2013	?	Final 2

== Records ==
Prior to this competition, the existing world, Asian, and Southeast Asian Games records were as follows.

World Record	Katie Ledecky (USA)	8:13.86	Barcelona, Spain	3 August 2013
Asian Record	Xin Xin (CHN)	8:19.43	Shenyang, China	10 September 2013
Games Record	Lynette Lim (SIN)	8:35.41	Vientiane, Laos	12 December 2009

== Results ==
Rank	Heat	Lane	Athlete	Time	Notes
1st place, gold medalist(s)	2	4	Khoo Cai Lin (MAS)	8:49.51	
2nd place, silver medalist(s)	2	3	Benjaporn Sriphanomthorn (THA)	8:49.61	
3rd place, bronze medalist(s)	2	7	Nguyen Thi Anh Vien (VIE)	8:52.77	
4	2	5	Lynette Lim (SIN)	8:59.39	
5	2	1	Benjaporn Sriphanomthorn (THA)	9:00.20	
6	2	6	Patarawadee Kittiya (THA)	9:06.12	
7	2	2	Raina Saumi Grahana Ramdhani (INA)	9:08.11	
8	1	5	Iffy Nadya Fahmiruwhanti (INA)	9:17.60	
9	2	8	Le Thi My Thao (VIE)	9:19.01	
10	1	4	Nadia Adrianna Redza Goh (MAS)	9:20.73	
11	1	3	Khant Khant Su San (MYA)	10:00.81	
12	1	6	Sebeal Thin (MYA)	10:30.95	
