= Swimming at the 2013 SEA Games – Women's 400 metre freestyle =

The Women's 400 metre freestyle event at the 2013 SEA Games took place on 13 December 2013 at Wunna Theikdi Aquatics Centre.

There were 11 competitors from 6 countries who took part in this event. Two heats were held. The heat in which a swimmer competed did not formally matter for advancement, as the swimmers with the top eight times from both field qualified for the finals.

== Schedule ==
All times are Myanmar Standard Time (UTC+06:30)

Date	Time	Event
Thursday, 13 December 2013	09:11	Heats
Thursday, 13 December 2013	18:30	Final

== Records ==
Prior to this competition, the existing world, Asian, and Southeast Asian Games records were as follows.

World Record	Federica Pellegrini (ITA)	3:59.15	Rome, Italy	26 July 2009
Asian Record	Chen Qian (CHN)	4:02.35	Jinan, China	18 October 2009
Games Record	Khoo Cai Lin (MAS)	4:10.75	Vientiane, Laos	11 December 2009

== Results ==
=== Heats ===
Rank	Heat	Lane	Athlete	Time	Notes
1	2	4	Khoo Cai Lin (MAS)	4:27.77	Q
2	2	5	Benjaporn Sriphanomthorn (THA)	4:28.48	Q
3	1	5	Lynette Lim (SIN)	4:29.20	Q
4	1	3	Rachel Tseng (SIN)	4:29.78	Q
5	2	3	Raina Saumi Grahana Ramdhani (INA)	4:33.49	
6	1	4	Nguyen Thi Anh Vien (VIE)	4:33.51	Q
7	1	6	Iffy Nadya Fahmiruwhanti (INA)	4:34.16	Q
8	2	2	Nadia Adrianna Redza Goh (MAS)	4:43.25	Q
9	1	2	Khant Khant Su San (MYA)	4:51.88	Q
10	2	7	Sebeal Thin (MYA)	5:03.81	
11	2	6	Tran Tam Nguyen (VIE)	5:03.90	

=== Final ===
Rank	Lane	Athlete	Time	Notes
1st place, gold medalist(s)	5	Benjaporn Sriphanomthorn (THA)	4:14.23	
2nd place, silver medalist(s)	2	Nguyen Thi Anh Vien (VIE)	4:16.06	
3rd place, bronze medalist(s)	3	Lynette Lim (SIN)	4:21.24	
4	6	Rachel Tseng (SIN)	4:22.17	
5	4	Khoo Cai Lin (MAS)	4:25.02	
6	7	Iffy Nadya Fahmiruwhanti (INA)	4:35.74	
7	1	Nadia Adrianna Redza Goh (MAS)	4:40.91	
8	8	Khant Khant Su San (MYA)	4:52.89	
