= Swimming at the 2013 SEA Games – Women's 200 metre butterfly =

The women's 200 metre butterfly event at the 2013 SEA Games took place on 16 December 2013 at Wunna Theikdi Aquatics Centre.

There were 12 competitors from 6 countries who took part in this event. Two heats were held. The heat in which a swimmer competed did not formally matter for advancement, as the swimmers with the top eight times from both field qualified for the finals.

== Schedule ==
All times are Myanmar Standard Time (UTC+06:30)

Date	Time	Event
Monday, 16 December 2013	09:12	Heats
Monday, 16 December 2013	18:45	Final

== Records ==
Prior to this competition, the existing world, Asian, and Southeast Asian Games records were as follows.

World Record	Liu Zige (CHN)	2:01.81	Jinan, China	21 October 2009
Asian Record	Liu Zige (CHN)	2:01.81	Jinan, China	21 October 2009
Games Record	Tao Li (SIN)	2:13.49	Vientiane, Laos	14 December 2009

== Results ==
=== Heats ===
Rank	Heat	Lane	Athlete	Time	Notes
1	1	3	Nguyen Thi Anh Vien (VIE)	2:18.30	Q
2	2	4	Quah Ting Wen (SIN)	2:19.50	Q
3	2	5	Monalisa Arieswaty Lorenza (INA)	2:19.71	Q
4	1	6	Tao Li (SIN)	2:19.94	Q
5	1	4	Patarawadee Kittiya (THA)	2:20.16	Q
6	2	6	Nguyen Thi Kim Tuyen (VIE)	2:21.29	Q
7	1	5	Sutasinee Pankaew (THA)	2:22.19	Q
8	1	2	Yap Siew Hui (MAS)	2:24.87	Q
9	2	2	Khoo Cai Lin (MAS)	2:26.09	
10	2	7	Khant Khant Su San (MYA)	2:36.91	
11	1	7	Shun Lei Maw Oo (MYA)	2:43.04	
—	2	3	Raina Saumi Grahana Ramdhani (INA)	DNS	

=== Final ===
Rank	Lane	Athlete	Time	Notes
1st place, gold medalist(s)	2	Patarawadee Kittiya (THA)	2:13.83	
2nd place, silver medalist(s)	5	Quah Ting Wen (SIN)	2:14.42	
3rd place, bronze medalist(s)	6	Tao Li (SIN)	2:14.51	
4	3	Monalisa Arieswaty Lorenza (INA)	2:15.02	
5	7	Nguyen Thi Kim Tuyen (VIE)	2:16.32	
6	4	Nguyen Thi Anh Vien (VIE)	2:20.73	
7	1	Sutasinee Pankaew (THA)	2:21.04	
8	8	Yap Siew Hui (MAS)	2:24.27	
