= Athletics at the 2013 SEA Games – Women's 200 metres =

The women's 200-metre race, at the 2013 SEA Games, took place on December 17 at the Wunna Theikdi Stadium, in Naypyidaw, Burma.

== Schedule ==
All times are Myanmar Standard Time (UTC+06:30)

Date	Time	Event
Wednesday, 18 December 2013	09:20	Heats
Wednesday, 18 December 2013	16:25	Final

== Records ==
Prior to this competition, the existing world, Asian, and Southeast Asian Games records were as follows.

World Record	Florence Griffith-Joyner (USA)	21.34	Seoul, South Korea	29 September 1988
Asian Record	Li Xuemei (CHN)	22.01	Shanghai, China	22 October 1997
Games Record	Supavadee Khawpeag (THA)	23.30	Kuala Lumpur, Malaysia	15 September 2001

== Results ==
Legend

- DSQ — Disqualified
- DNF — Do Not Finish

=== Round 1 ===
==== Heat 1 ====
- Wind: -0.1 m/s

Rank	Lane	Athlete	Time	Notes
1	5	Vu Thi Huong (VIE)	23.99	
2	7	Veronica Shanti Pereira (SIN)	24.12	
3	4	Neeranuch Klomdee (THA)	24.33	
4	2	Lusiana Satriani (INA)	25.07	
5	6	Zaidatul Husniah Zulkifli (MAS)	25.17	
—	3	Kay Khine Lwin (MYA)	DNS	

==== Heat 2 ====
- Wind: -1.0 m/s

Rank	Lane	Athlete	Time	Notes
1	2	Nguyen Thi Oanh (VIE)	24.34	
2	6	Phatsorn Jaksuninkorn (THA)	24.70	
3	5	Komalam Shally Selvaretnam (MAS)	25.06	
4	7	Ni Nyoman Kerni (INA)	25.08	
5	3	Su Kyi Aung (MYA)	25.38	
6	4	Tyra Summer Ree (SIN)	26.50	

=== Final ===
- Wind: +0.1 m/s

Rank	Lane	Athlete	Time	Notes
1st place, gold medalist(s)	3	Vu Thi Huong (VIE)	23.55	
2nd place, silver medalist(s)	6	Neeranuch Klomdee (THA)	24.02	
3rd place, bronze medalist(s)	4	Nguyen Thi Oanh (VIE)	24.13	
4	5	Veronica Shanti Pereira (SIN)	24.16	
5	7	Phatsorn Jaksuninkorn (THA)	24.43	
6	8	Ni Nyoman Kerni (INA)	24.68	
7	2	Komalam Shally Selvaretnam (MAS)	24.95	
8	1	Lusiana Satriani (INA)	25.13	
