= Malaysia at the 2013 SEA Games =

Malaysia at the 2013 Southeast Asian Games
- IOC code: MAS
- NOC: Olympic Council of Malaysia
- Website: www.olympic.org.my (in English)

in Naypyidaw
- Competitors: 556 in 29 sports
- Flag bearer: Sazali Samad (bodybuilding)
- Officials: 199
- Medals Ranked 5th: Gold 43 Silver 38 Bronze 79 Total 160

Southeast Asian Games appearances (overview)
- 1959; 1961; 1965; 1967; 1969; 1971; 1973; 1975; 1977; 1979; 1981; 1983; 1985; 1987; 1989; 1991; 1993; 1995; 1997; 1999; 2001; 2003; 2005; 2007; 2009; 2011; 2013; 2015; 2017; 2019; 2021; 2023; 2025; 2027; 2029

Malaysia competed in the 2013 Southeast Asian Games held in Naypyidaw, the capital of Myanmar, as well as in two other main cities, Yangon and Mandalay. Malaysia was selected the host nation for the 2017 edition.

== Medallists ==
Medal	Name	Sport	Event	Date
Gold	Diana Bong Siong Lin	Wushu	Women's nanquan	7 Dec
Gold	Tai Cheau Xuen	Wushu	Women's nandao	8 Dec
Gold	Phoon Eyin	Wushu	Women's quiangshu	9 Dec
Gold	Mohd Sulaiman Muda	Equestrian	Individual 80 km endurance	11 Dec
Gold	Mohd Sulaiman Muda; Mohd Bulkhari Rozali; Abdul Halim Alihan; Asri Abdul Aziz; Rohaizad Roslan	Equestrian	Team 80 km endurance	11 Dec
Gold	Eddy Chew	Shooting	Men's 50 m free pistol	13 Dec
Gold	Lim Chee Wei	Karate	Men's individual kata	13 Dec
Gold	Lim Chee Wei; Leong Tze Wai; Emmanuel Leong	Karate	Men's team kata	13 Dec
Gold	Nur Syazreen A. Malik; Nor Hamizah Abu Hassan	Pencak silat	Women's doubles artistic	13 Dec
Gold	Christina Loh Yen Ling	Swimming	Women's 100 m breaststroke	13 Dec
Gold	Praveen Nair Mathavan	Equestrian	Individual dressage	14 Dec
Gold	Shree Sharmini Segaran	Karate	Women's individual kumite 68 kg	14 Dec
Gold	Senthil Kumaran Silvarajoo	Karate	Men's individual kumite 60 kg	14 Dec
Gold	Woon Khe Wei; Vivian Hoo Kah Mun	Badminton	Women's doubles	14 Dec
Gold	Khoo Cai Lin	Swimming	Women's 800 m freestyle	14 Dec
Gold	Daniel Bego	Swimming	Men's 400 m freestyle	14 Dec
Gold	Nisha Alagasan	Karate	Women's individual kumite 55 kg	14 Dec
Gold	Syakilla Salni Jefry Krishnan	Karate	Women's individual kumite 61 kg	14 Dec
Gold	Nisha Alagasan; Nur Eleena Anis Abdul Malik; Shree Sharmini Segaran; Syakilla Salni Jefry Krishnan	Karate	Women's team kumite	15 Dec
Gold	Christina Loh Yen Ling	Swimming	Women's 200 m breaststroke	15 Dec
Gold	Muhammad Irfan Shamshuddin	Athletics	Men's discus throw	15 Dec
Gold	Thor Chuan Leong	Billiards and snooker	6 red snooker singles	15 Dec
Gold	Wong Ngai Hong	Bodybuilding	Men's 90 kg	15 Dec
Gold	Mohd Al Jufferi Jamari	Pencak silat	Men's 65-70 kg	15 Dec
Gold	Khairul Anuar Mohamad	Archery	Men's individual recurve	16 Dec
Gold	Khairul Anuar Mohamad; Atiq Bazil Bakri; Haziq Kamaruddin	Archery	Men's team recurve	17 Dec
Gold	Mohd Jironi Riduan	Athletics	Men's 800 m	17 Dec
Gold	Nauraj Singh Randhawa	Athletics	Men's high jump	18 Dec
Gold	Cheong Jun Hoong	Diving	Women's 3 m springboard	18 Dec
Gold	Muhammad Nazreen Abdullah	Diving	Men's 10 m platform	18 Dec
Gold	Mohd Jironi Riduan	Athletics	Men's 1500 m	19 Dec
Gold	Ooi Tze Liang	Diving	Men's 3 m springboard	19 Dec
Gold	Pandelela Rinong Pamg	Diving	Women's 10 m platform	19 Dec
Gold	Ooi Tze Liang; Ahmad Amsyar Azman	Diving	Men's synchronised 3 m springboard	20 Dec
Gold	Ng Yan Yee; Cheong Jun Hoong	Diving	Women's synchronised 3 m springboard	20 Dec
Gold	Ahmad Syukri Abdul Aziz; Mohamad Faizal Norizan	Sailing	Men's international 420	20 Dec
Gold	Khairulnizam Afendy	Sailing	Men's laser standard	20 Dec
Gold	Malaysia women's national field hockey team: Siti Shahida Saad; Siti Noor Hafiza Zainordin; Raja Norsharina Raja Shabuddin; Rabiatul Adawiyah Mohamed; Nurul Nabihah Mansur; Noor Hasliza Md Ali; Juliani Mohamad Din; Farah Ayuni Yahya; Nuraini Abdul Rashid; Norhasikin Halim; Norazlin Sumantri; Nor Hidayah Ahmad Bokhari; Nadia Abdul Rahman; Surizan Awang Noh; Siti Noor Amarina Ruhani; Norbaini Hashim; Fazila Sylvester Silin; Fatin Shafika Mahd Sukri	Field hockey	Women's tournament	20 Dec
Gold	Malaysia national field hockey team: Tengku Ahmad Tajuddin Tengku Abdul Jalil; Roslan Jamaluddin; Norhizzat Sumantri; Mohd Shahrun Nabil Abdullah; Baljit Singh Charun Singh; Azlan Misron; Amir Farid Ahmad Fuzi; Ramadhan Rosli; Jivan Mohan; Ahmad Kazamirul Nasruddin Jamaludin; Muhamad Azammi Adabi; Mohd Hairi Abdul Rahman; Dangerous Matthew Lee; Dedi Ariyadi Jumaidi; Muhammad Azwar Abdul Rahman; Muhamad Aminudin Mohd Zain; Muhamad Amin Rahim; Azreen Rizal Nasir	Field hockey	Men's tournament	21 Dec
Gold	Ooi Tze Liang; Muhammad Nazreen Abdullah	Diving	Men's synchronised 10 m platform	21 Dec
Gold	Nur Dhabitah Sabri; Leong Mun Yee	Diving	Women's synchronised 10 m platform	21 Dec
Gold	Mohd Lokman Akimi Mat Roji	Muay	Men's 51 kg	21 Dec
Gold	Mohd Faizal Ramli	Muay	Men's 75 kg	21 Dec
Silver	Ho Mun Hua; Wong Weng Son; Lee Yang	Wushu	Men's duilian (bare hands)	8 Dec
Silver	Ho Mun Hua	Wushu	Men's nanquan	8 Dec
Silver	Ng Say Yoke	Wushu	Men's gunshu	8 Dec
Silver	Ng Shin Yii	Wushu	Women's taijiquan	8 Dec
Silver	Ho Mun Hua	Wushu	Men's nandao	9 Dec
Silver	Lim Ching Hwang; Kevin Yeap Soon Choy; Daniel Bego; Welson Sim Wee Sheng	Swimming	Men's 4 × 200 m freestyle relay	12 Dec
Silver	Theebaan Govindasamy	Karate	Men's individual kumite +84 kg	13 Dec
Silver	Joseline Cheah Lee Yean; Wahidah Ismail; Bibiana Ng Pei Chin	Shooting	Women's team 10 m air pistol	14 Dec
Silver	Raghonathan Sharmendran	Karate	Men's individual kumite 67 kg	14 Dec
Silver	Sazali Samad	Bodybuilding	Men's 70 kg	14 Dec
Silver	Ramkumar Govindasyui	Boxing	Men's 69 kg	14 Dec
Silver	Lim Ching Hwang; Welson Sim Wee Sheng; Vernon Lee Jeau Zhi; Daniel Bego	Swimming	Men's 4 × 100 m freestyle relay	14 Dec
Silver	Kevin Yeap Soon Choy	Swimming	Men's 1500 m freestyle	15 Dec
Silver	Govinash Raja Kumar; Mohd Hatta Mahamut; Shaharudin Jamaludin; Sharrma Jayaraman; Theebaan Govindasamy; Raghonathan Sharmendran; Harry Majohn	Karate	Men's team kumite	15 Dec
Silver	Ahmad Shahril Zailudin	Pencak silat	Men's 60-65 kg	15 Dec
Silver	Eddy Chew	Shooting	Men's 10 m air pistol	15 Dec
Silver	Renee Kelly Lee Casier	Athletics	Women's hammer throw	16 Dec
Silver	Atiq Bazil Bakri	Archery	Men's individual recurve	16 Dec
Silver	Noor Azman Abdul Hamid; Mohd Muqlis Borhan; Mohd Hanafiah Dolah; Norshahruddin Mad Ghani; Izurin Refin	Sepak takraw	Men's regu	16 Dec
Silver	Muhammad Zaki Mahazam; Saritha Cham Nong	Archery	Mixed team compound	16 Dec
Silver	Daniel Bego	Swimming	Men's 200 m freestyle	16 Dec
Silver	Iskandar Alwi	Athletics	Men's pole vault	16 Dec
Silver	Tan Kah Thiam	Billiards and snooker	Men's 9 ball pool singles	16 Dec
Silver	Siti Nur Masitah Mohd Badrin	Shooting	Women's 25 m air pistol	17 Dec
Silver	Mohd Juwaidi Mazuki; Muhammad Zaki Mahazam; Mohd Kaharuddin Ashah	Archery	Men's team compound	17 Dec
Silver	Loh Sea Keong; Mohammad Saufi Mat Senan; Muhamad Rauf Nur Misbah	Cycling	Men's team 163 km road race	18 Dec
Silver	Ng Yan Yee	Diving	Women's 3 m springboard	18 Dec
Silver	Ooi Tze Liang	Diving	Men's 10 m platform	18 Dec
Silver	Harith Ammar Mohd Sobri	Athletics	Men's 200 m	18 Dec
Silver	Gavin Kyle Green	Golf	Men's individual	18 Dec
Silver	Loh Zhiayi	Diving	Women's 10 m platform	19 Dec
Silver	Rayzam Shah Wan Sofian	Athletics	Men's 110 m hurdles	19 Dec
Silver	Muhammad Hakimi Ismail	Athletics	Men's triple jump	19 Dec
Silver	Adi Aliffuddin Hussin	Athletics	Men's shot put	19 Dec
Silver	Ryan Chong Wy Lunn	Taekwondo	Men's 58-63 kg	20 Dec
Silver	Muhammad Dhiauddin Rozaini	Sailing	Men's optimist	20 Dec
Silver	Nuraisyah Jamil; Umi Norwahida Sallahuddin	Sailing	Women's international 420	20 Dec
Silver	Nur Amirah Hamid	Sailing	Women's laser radial	20 Dec
Bronze	Alice Harun; Asumalin Rattana Somchok; Norazira Suhaimi; Nor Farhana Ismail; Nurazila Rosli; Nur Liyana Ismail; Nurrashidah Abdulrashid; Nurul Izzatul Hikmah Zulkifli	Chinlone	Women's the linking (primary level)	4 Dec
Bronze	Daut Amba; Harryson Linggong; Izuan Efendi Azlan; Mohammad Azlan Alias; Mohd Shafirul Nizam Zainal; Tunku Noor Azwari Tunku Ishak; Zuleffendi Sumari	Chinlone	Men's the linking (primary level)	4 Dec
Bronze	Daut Amba; Harryson Linggong; Izuan Efendi Azlan; Mohammad Azlan Alias; Mohd Shafirul Nizam Zainal; Tunku Noor Azwari Tunku Ishak; Zuleffendi Sumari	Chinlone	Men's the same strokes (primary level)	5 Dec
Bronze	Alice Harun; Asumalin Rattana Somchok; Norazira Suhaimi; Nor Farhana Ismail; Nurazila Rosli; Nur Liyana Ismail; Nurrashidah Abdulrashid; Nurul Izzatul Hikmah Zulkifli	Chinlone	Women's the same strokes (primary level)	5 Dec
Bronze	Alice Harun; Asumalin Rattana Somchok; Norazira Suhaimi; Nor Farhana Ismail; Nurazila Rosli; Nur Liyana Ismail; Nurrashidah Abdulrashid; Nurul Izzatul Hikmah Zulkifli	Chinlone	Women's non-repetition (primary level)	6 Dec
Bronze	Daut Amba; Harryson Linggong; Izuan Efendi Azlan; Mohammad Azlan Alias; Mohd Shafirul Nizam Zainal; Tunku Noor Azwari Tunku Ishak; Zuleffendi Sumari	Chinlone	Men's non-repetition (primary level)	6 Dec
Bronze	Phoon Eyin	Wushu	Women's jianshu	7 Dec
Bronze	Tai Cheau Xuen	Wushu	Women's nanquan	7 Dec
Bronze	Ng Say Yoke	Wushu	Men's daoshu	9 Dec
Bronze	Diana Bong Siong Lin	Wushu	Women's nangun	9 Dec
Bronze	Lim Chi Leng	Wushu	Women's sanshou 48 kg	9 Dec
Bronze	Ho Mun Hua	Wushu	Men's nangun	10 Dec
Bronze	Haslisa Hamed; Nur Suryani Mohd Taibi; Muslifah Zulkifli	Shooting	Women's team 50 m rifle prone	12 Dec
Bronze	Siti Rajah Ali	Canoeing	Women's K-1 200 m	13 Dec
Bronze	Abdul Hadi Abdul Malek; Eddy Chew; Jonathan Wong Guanjie	Shooting	Men's team 50 m free pistol	13 Dec
Bronze	Jamalliah Jamaludin	Karate	Women's individual kumite +68 kg	13 Dec
Bronze	Kugan Ravindran; Genkeswaran Muniyan; Mok Tze Meng; Mok Khye Zen	Chess	Men's team traditional rapid	13 Dec
Bronze	Nazirul Akmal Abd Rahman; Noor Azman Abdul Hamid; Farhan Adam; Mohd Muqlis Borhan; Mohd Hanafiah Dolah; Muhammad Syahmi Husin; Norshahruddin Mad Ghani; Sahidan Md Ali; Mohamad Fazil Mohd Asri; Izurin Refin; Mohd Syazreenqamar Salehan; Mohd Kamal Alfiza Shafie	Sepak takraw	Men's team	13 Dec
Bronze	Nurrashidah Abdul Rashid; Noor Fairuz Azizan; Siti Norzubaidah Che Ab Wahab; Alice Harun; Rahilah Harun; Nor Farhana Ismail; Nur Liyana Ismail; Nurul Izzatul Hikmah Md Zulkifli; Elly Syahira Rosli; Nur Azila Rosli; Asumalin Rattana Som Chok; Nor Azira Suhaimi	Sepak takraw	Women's team	13 Dec
Bronze	Jonathan Wong Guanjie	Shooting	Men's 50 m free pistol	13 Dec
Bronze	Celine Lee Xin Yi; Khaw Yee Voon; Zoey Wong Jia Rou	Karate	Women's team kata	13 Dec
Bronze	Thor Chuan Leong; Moh Keen Hoo	Billiards and snooker	Snooker doubles	13 Dec
Bronze	Lim Khim Wah; Ow Yao Han	Badminton	Men's doubles	14 Dec
Bronze	Shaharudin Jamaludin	Karate	Men's individual kumite 75 kg	14 Dec
Bronze	Kunasilan Lakanathan	Karate	Men's individual kumite 55 kg	14 Dec
Bronze	Mohd Hatta Mahamut	Karate	Men's individual kumite 84 kg	14 Dec
Bronze	Goh V Shem; Teo Kok Siang	Badminton	Men's doubles	14 Dec
Bronze	Tan Aik Quan; Lai Pei Jing	Badminton	Mixed doubles	14 Dec
Bronze	Mohd Fuad Mohd Reuvan	Boxing	Men's 46-49 kg	14 Dec
Bronze	Khir Akyazlan Azmi	Boxing	Men's 64 kg	14 Dec
Bronze	Azman Mansor	Boxing	Men's 81 kg	14 Dec
Bronze	Welson Sim Wee Sheng	Swimming	Men's 1500 m freestyle	15 Dec
Bronze	Eddy Chew; Choo Wen Yan; Jonathan Wong Guanjie	Shooting	Men's team 10 m air pistol	15 Dec
Bronze	Muhamad Helmi Abd Aziz	Pencak silat	Men's 50-55 kg	15 Dec
Bronze	Muhammad Saiful Syazwan Rahmat	Pencak silat	Men's 55-60 kg	15 Dec
Bronze	Mohd Fauzi Khalid	Pencak silat	Men's 70-75 kg	15 Dec
Bronze	Siti Zubaidah Che Omar	Pencak silat	Women's 55-60 kg	15 Dec
Bronze	Syed Akmal Fikri Syed Ali	Pétanque	Men's singles	15 Dec
Bronze	Nurul Farzieana Abdul Malek; Suhartisera Zamri	Pétanque	Women's doubles	15 Dec
Bronze	Yap See Tuan	Swimming	Men's 200 m breaststroke	15 Dec
Bronze	Erika Kong Chia Chia; Christina Loh Yen Ling; Yap Siew Hui; Khoo Cai Lin	Swimming	Women's 4 × 100 m medley relay	15 Dec
Bronze	Jackie Wong Siew Cheer	Athletics	Men's hammer throw	15 Dec
Bronze	Saritha Cham Nong	Archery	Women's individual compound	16 Dec
Bronze	Mohd Faiz Musa	Weightlifting	Men's 94 kg	16 Dec
Bronze	Nor Khasida Abdul Halim	Weightlifting	Women's 69 kg	16 Dec
Bronze	Muhammad Fauzan Ahmad Lutfi; Muhamad Rauf Nur Misbah; Muhamad Adiq Husainie Othman; Amir Mustafa Rusli	Cycling	Men's team 100 km time trial	16 Dec
Bronze	Malaysia women's national basketball team: Yong Shin Min; Yap Ching Yee; Saw Wei Yin; Pang Hui Pin; Nur Izzati Yaakob; Lee Siew Fun; Kew Suik May; Hee Shook Ying; Goh Beng Fong; Eugene Ting Chiau Teng; Choo Sook Ping; Ang Siew Teng	Basketball	Women's tournament	16 Dec
Bronze	Muhammad Dhiauddin Rozaini; Nor Nabila Natasha Mohd Nazri; Natashya Nabila Sawal; Muhamad Uzair Amin Mohd Yusof; Muhammad Fauzi Kaman Shah	Sailing	Open team optimist	17 Dec
Bronze	Nur Thahira Tasnim Abdul Aziz; Mohd Faiza Mohamad	Pétanque	Mixed doubles	18 Dec
Bronze	Yong Jin Kun	Taekwondo	Men's singles poomsae	18 Dec
Bronze	Choo Hong Kai; Yong Jin Kun; Kok Jun Ee	Taekwondo	Men's team poomsae	18 Dec
Bronze	Abdul Hemi Mohd	Taekwondo	Men's 68-74 kg	18 Dec
Bronze	Muhamad Jafaannuar Jamaludin	Judo	Men's 55-60 kg	18 Dec
Bronze	Thor Chuan Leong	Billiards and snooker	Snooker singles	18 Dec
Bronze	Moh Keen Hoo	Billiards and snooker	Snooker singles	18 Dec
Bronze	Muhammad Wafiyuddin Abdul Manaf; Gavin Kyle Green; Low Khai Jei; Abel Tam Kwang Yuan	Golf	Men's team	18 Dec
Bronze	Dunley Foo; Chin Ee Hooi; Muhamad Ashraf Haiqal; Muhd Shakirin Ibrahim	Table tennis	Men's team	19 Dec
Bronze	Angeline Tang An Qi; Beh Lee Wei; Lee Rou You; Ho Ying	Table tennis	Women's team	19 Dec
Bronze	Jenny Soh Fong Mee	Taekwondo	Women's 62-67 kg	19 Dec
Bronze	Noor Maizura Zainon	Judo	Women's 48-52 kg	19 Dec
Bronze	Anis Amira Basri; Mas Anis Syakirah Mohamad Jafri; Syed Ali Syed Akil	Pétanque	Mixed triples (1-M & 2-W)	19 Dec
Bronze	Chew Yi Wei	Diving	Men's 3 m springboard	19 Dec
Bronze	Raja Nursheena Raja Azhar	Athletics	Women's 100 m hurdles	19 Dec
Bronze	Schzuan Ahmad Rosely; Mohamad Arif Zulhilmi Alet; Yuvaraaj Panerselvam; Kannathasan Subramaniam	Athletics	Men's 4 × 400 m relay	19 Dec
Bronze	Rozaimi Rozali	Taekwondo	Men's 54-58 kg	20 Dec
Bronze	Nik Norbaizura Nik Azman	Judo	Women's 57-63 kg	20 Dec
Bronze	Nor Nabila Natasha Mohd Nazri	Sailing	Women's optimist	20 Dec
Bronze	Khairunnisa Mohd Afendy; Norashikin Mohamed Sayed	Sailing	Women's international 470	20 Dec
Bronze	Malaysia women's national futsal team: Noorhayanti Mohd Salleh; Farah Najihah Abdul Aziz; Siti Noor Halimi Hussain; Norhawa Md Yasin; Farhana Abdullah; Nur Shazreen Munazli; Farahiyah Muhamad Ridzuan; Nur Izzati Khairudin; Steffi Sarge Kaur Sergeant Singh; Fatin Shahida Azmi; Noor Asyikin Mohamad Noor; Felicia Adele Ng; Amirah Sarah Mohd Fahmi; Hanis Farhana Shamsul Azizan	Futsal	Women's tournament	20 Dec
Bronze	Beh Lee Wei	Table tennis	Women's singles	21 Dec
Bronze	Muhammad Ruzaini Abdul Razak	Judo	Men's +100 kg	21 Dec
Bronze	Nor Izzatul Fazlia Mohamad Tahir	Judo	Women's 70-78 kg	21 Dec
Bronze	Noor Asnida Abd Razak	Judo	Women's +78 kg	21 Dec
Bronze	Mohamad Hakem Ahmad Saberi; Muhamad Hafizuddin Mat Daud; Saiful Bahri Musmin	Pétanque	Men's triples	21 Dec
Bronze	Mohd Sukri Hassan	Muay	Men's 48 kg	21 Dec
Bronze	Ain Kamarrudin	Muay	Men's 57 kg	21 Dec
Bronze	Mohamad Rafi Abdul Manaf	Muay	Men's 60 kg	21 Dec

== Medal summary ==
=== Medal by sport ===
Medals by sport
Sport	1st place, gold medalist(s)	2nd place, silver medalist(s)	3rd place, bronze medalist(s)	Total	Rank
Diving	8	3	1	12	1
Karate	7	3	5	15	1
Athletics	4	6	3	13	5
Swimming	4	4	3	11	5
Wushu	3	5	6	14	4
Equestrian	3	0	0	3	1
Sailing	2	3	3	8	3
Archery	2	3	1	6	1
Pencak silat	2	1	4	7	5
Muay	2	0	3	5	2
Field hockey	2	0	0	2	1
Shooting	1	3	4	8	3
Billiards and snooker	1	1	3	5	6
Bodybuilding	1	1	0	2	4
Badminton	1	0	3	4	3
Taekwondo	0	1	5	6	8
Boxing	0	1	3	4	6
Sepak takraw	0	1	2	3	5
Cycling	0	1	1	2	7
Golf	0	1	1	2	4
Chinlone	0	0	6	6	5
Judo	0	0	6	6	8
Pétanque	0	0	5	5	6
Table tennis	0	0	3	3	4
Weightlifting	0	0	2	2	6
Basketball	0	0	1	1	3
Canoeing	0	0	1	1	6
Chess	0	0	1	1	6
Futsal	0	0	1	1	3
Football	0	0	0	0	0
Kenpō	0	0	0	0	0
Rowing	0	0	0	0	0
Traditional boat race	0	0	0	0	0
Volleyball	0	0	0	0	0
Vovinam	0	0	0	0	0
Water polo	0	0	0	0	0
Wrestling	0	0	0	0	0
Total	43	38	77	158	5

=== Medal by date ===
Medals by date
Date	1st place, gold medalist(s)	2nd place, silver medalist(s)	3rd place, bronze medalist(s)	Total
4 Dec	0	0	2	2
5 Dec	0	0	2	2
6 Dec	0	0	2	2
7 Dec	1	0	2	3
8 Dec	1	4	0	5
9 Dec	1	1	3	5
10 Dec	0	0	1	1
11 Dec	2	0	0	2
12 Dec	0	1	1	2
13 Dec	5	1	9	15
14 Dec	8	5	9	22
15 Dec	6	4	11	21
16 Dec	1	7	5	13
17 Dec	2	2	1	5
18 Dec	3	5	8	16
19 Dec	3	4	8	15
20 Dec	5	4	5	14
21 Dec	5	0	8	13
Total	43	38	77	158

=== Multiple medalists ===
Multiple medalists
Name	Sport	1st place, gold medalist(s)	2nd place, silver medalist(s)	3rd place, bronze medalist(s)	Total
Ooi Tze Liang	Diving	3	1	0	4
Christina Loh Yen Ling	Swimming	2	0	1	3
Cheong Jun Hoong	Diving	2	0	0	2
Khairul Anuar Mohamad	Archery	2	0	0	2
Lim Chee Wei	Karate	2	0	0	2
Mohd Jironi Riduan	Athletics	2	0	0	2
Mohd Sulaiman Muda	Equestrian	2	0	0	2
Muhammad Nazreen Abdullah	Diving	2	0	0	2
Nisha Alagasan	Karate	2	0	0	2
Shree Sharmini Segaran	Karate	2	0	0	2
Syakilla Salni Jefry Krishnan	Karate	2	0	0	2
Daniel Bego	Swimming	1	3	0	4
Eddy Chew	Shooting	1	1	2	4
Atiq Bazil Bakri	Archery	1	1	0	2
Ng Yan Yee	Diving	1	1	0	2
Thor Chuan Leong	Billiards and snooker	1	0	2	3
Tai Cheau Xuen	Wushu	1	0	1	2
Diana Bong Siong Lin	Wushu	1	0	1	2
Eyin Phoon	Wushu	1	0	1	2
Khoo Cai Lin	Swimming	1	0	1	2
Ho Mun Hua	Wushu	0	3	1	4
Welson Sim Wee Sheng	Swimming	0	2	1	3
Kevin Yeap Soon Choy	Swimming	0	2	0	2
Lim Ching Hwang	Swimming	0	2	0	2
Muhammad Zaki Mahazam	Archery	0	2	0	2
Raghonathan Sharmendran	Karate	0	2	0	2
Theebaan Govindasamy	Karate	0	2	0	2
Gavin Kyle Green	Golf	0	1	1	2
Izurin Refin	Sepak takraw	0	1	1	2
Mohd Hanafiah Dolah	Sepak takraw	0	1	1	2
Mohd Hatta Mahamut	Karate	0	1	1	2
Mohd Muqlis Borhan	Sepak takraw	0	1	1	2
Muhammad Dhiauddin Rozaini	Sailing	0	1	1	2
Noor Azman Abdul Hamid	Sepak takraw	0	1	1	2
Norshahruddin Mad Ghani	Sepak takraw	0	1	1	2
Saritha Cham Nong	Archery	0	1	1	2
Ng Say Yoke	Wushu	0	1	1	2
Shaharudin Jamaludin	Karate	0	1	1	2
Alice Harun	Chinlone; Sepak takraw	0	0	4	4
Asumalin Rattana Somchok	Chinlone; Sepak takraw	0	0	4	4
Norazira Suhaimi	Chinlone; Sepak takraw	0	0	4	4
Nor Farhana Ismail	Chinlone; Sepak takraw	0	0	4	4
Nurazila Rosli	Chinlone; Sepak takraw	0	0	4	4
Nur Liyana Ismail	Chinlone; Sepak takraw	0	0	4	4
Nurrashidah Abdulrashid	Chinlone; Sepak takraw	0	0	4	4
Nurul Izzatul Hikmah Zulkifli	Chinlone; Sepak takraw	0	0	4	4
Daut Amba	Chinlone	0	0	3	3
Harryson Linggong	Chinlone	0	0	3	3
Izuan Efendi Azlan	Chinlone	0	0	3	3
Jonathan Wong Guanjie	Shooting	0	0	3	3
Mohammad Azlan Alias	Chinlone	0	0	3	3
Mohd Shafirul Nizam Zainal	Chinlone	0	0	3	3
Tunku Noor Azwari Tunku Ishak	Chinlone	0	0	3	3
Zuleffendi Sumari	Chinlone	0	0	3	3
Jin Kun Yong	Taekwondo	0	0	2	2
Lee Wei Beh	Table tennis	0	0	2	2
Moh Keen Hoo	Billiards and snooker	0	0	2	2
Nor Nabila Natasha Mohd Nazri	Sailing	0	0	2	2

== Aquatics ==
=== Diving ===
Men

Athlete	Event	Preliminary		Final	
Athlete	Event	Score	Rank	Score	Rank
Chew Yi Wei	3 m springboard	—N/a		314.20	3rd place, bronze medalist(s)
Ooi Tze Liang	3 m springboard	—N/a		431.90	1st place, gold medalist(s)
Muhammad Nazreen Abdullah	10 m platform	—N/a		398.05	1st place, gold medalist(s)
Ooi Tze Liang	10 m platform	—N/a		397.20	2nd place, silver medalist(s)
Ahmad Amsyar Azman; Ooi Tze Liang	3 m synchronized springboard	—N/a		373.35	1st place, gold medalist(s)
Muhammad Nazreen Abdullah; Ooi Tze Liang	10 m synchronized platform	—N/a		386.28	1st place, gold medalist(s)

Women

Athlete	Event	Preliminary		Final	
Athlete	Event	Score	Rank	Score	Rank
Cheong Jun Hoong	3 m springboard	—N/a		327.15	1st place, gold medalist(s)
Ng Yan Yee	3 m springboard	—N/a		323.10	2nd place, silver medalist(s)
Loh Zhiayi	10 m platform	—N/a		292.10	2nd place, silver medalist(s)
Pandelela Rinong	10 m platform	—N/a		346.60	1st place, gold medalist(s)
Cheong Jun Hoong; Ng Yan Yee	3 m synchronized springboard	—N/a		293.70	1st place, gold medalist(s)
Leong Mun Yee; Nur Dhabitah Sabri	10 m synchronized platform	—N/a		281.64	1st place, gold medalist(s)

=== Swimming ===
Men

Athlete	Event	Heats		Final	
Athlete	Event	Time	Overall rank	Time	Rank
Lim Ching Hwang	50 m freestyle	24.42	8 Q	23.54	4
Daniel Bego	100 m freestyle	52.17	8 Q	51.21	4
Lim Ching Hwang	100 m freestyle	52.02	5 Q	52.04	8
Daniel Bego	200 m freestyle	1:57.10	1 Q	1:51.10	2nd place, silver medalist(s)
Lim Ching Hwang	200 m freestyle	1:57.32	3 Q	1:54.03	6
Daniel Bego	400 m freestyle	4:06.68	3 Q	3:54.89	1st place, gold medalist(s)
Kevin Yeap Soon Choy	400 m freestyle	4:04.76	1 Q	4:00.75	5
Kevin Yeap Soon Choy	1500 m freestyle	—N/a		15:45.89	2nd place, silver medalist(s)
Welson Sim Wee Sheng	1500 m freestyle	—N/a		15:57.98	3rd place, bronze medalist(s)
Tern Jian Han	100 m backstroke	59.25	3 Q	58.07	6
Tern Jian Han	200 m backstroke	2:08.94	1 Q	2:07.89	5
Shaun Yap Kah Choon	100 m breaststroke	1:05.38	9	did not advance	
Yap See Tuan	100 m breaststroke	1:05.19	7 Q	1:05.16	5
Shaun Yap Kah Choon	200 m breaststroke	Disqualified		did not advance	
Yap See Tuan	200 m breaststroke	2:21.12	2 Q	2:18.57	3rd place, bronze medalist(s)
Vernon Lee Jeau Zhi	200 m butterfly	2:06.06	1 Q	2:05.51	4
Vernon Lee Jeau Zhi	200 m individual medley	2:11.41	8 Q	2:08.78	6
Wong Fu Kang	200 m individual medley	2:15.22	11	did not advance	
Vernon Lee Jeau Zhi	400 m individual medley	4:44.04	9	did not advance	
Wong Fu Kang	400 m individual medley	5:02.15	11	did not advance	
Daniel Bego; Lim Ching Hwang; Vernon Lee Jeau Zhi; Welson Sim Wee Sheng	4 × 100 m freestyle relay	—N/a		3:26.98 NR	2nd place, silver medalist(s)
Daniel Bego; Kevin Yeap Soon Choy; Lim Ching Hwang; Welson Sim Wee Sheng	4 × 200 m freestyle relay	—N/a		7:27.32	2nd place, silver medalist(s)
Daniel Bego; Lim Ching Hwang; Tern Jian Han; Yap See Tuan	4 × 100 m medley relay	—N/a		3:48.74	4

Women

Athlete	Event	Heats		Final	
Athlete	Event	Time	Overall rank	Time	Rank
Khoo Cai Lin	400 m freestyle	4:27.77	1 Q	4:25.02	5
Nadia Adrianna Redza Goh	400 m freestyle	4:43.25	8 Q	4:40.91	7
Khoo Cai Lin	800 m freestyle	—N/a		8:49.51	1st place, gold medalist(s)
Nadia Adrianna Redza Goh	800 m freestyle	—N/a		9:20.73	10
Christina Loh Yen Ling	100 m breaststroke	1:12.51	1 Q	1:10.55	1st place, gold medalist(s)
Nadia Adrianna Redza Goh	100 m breaststroke	1:15.86	7 Q	1:15.33	6
Christina Loh Yen Ling	200 m breaststroke	2:40.10	2 Q	2:32.56	1st place, gold medalist(s)
Nadia Adrianna Redza Goh	200 m breaststroke	2:42.82	5 Q	2:39.10	5
Yap Siew Hui	200 m butterfly	1:03.48	7 Q	1:01.97	4
Khoo Cai Lin	200 m butterfly	2:26.09	9	did not advance	
Yap Siew Hui	200 m butterfly	2:24.87	8 Q	2:24.27	8
Erika Kong Chia Chia	200 m individual medley	2:25.50	6 Q	2:23.97	7
Nadia Adrianna Redza Goh	200 m individual medley	2:26.53	7 Q	2:26.07	8
Erika Kong Chia Chia	400 m individual medley	—N/a		5:03.44	9
Nadia Adrianna Redza Goh	400 m individual medley	—N/a		5:09.83	6
Erika Kong Chia Chia; Khoo Cai Lin; Nadia Adrianna Redza Goh; Yap Siew Hui	4 × 100 m freestyle relay	—N/a		4:06.35	4
Erika Kong Chia Chia; Khoo Cai Lin; Nadia Adrianna Redza Goh; Yap Siew Hui	4 × 200 m freestyle relay	—N/a		did not start	
Erika Kong Chia Chia; Khoo Cai Lin; Nadia Adrianna Redza Goh; Yap Siew Hui	4 × 100 m medley relay	—N/a		4:17.77	3rd place, bronze medalist(s)

== Athletics ==
Key

- Note– Ranks given for track events are within the athlete's heat only
- Q = Qualified for the next round
- q = Qualified for the next round as a fastest loser or, in field events, by position without achieving the qualifying target
- NR = National record
- N/A = Round not applicable for the event
- Bye = Athlete not required to compete in round

Men
Track and road events

Athlete	Event	Heat		Final	
Athlete	Event	Result	Rank	Result	Rank
Eddie Edward Jr	100 m	10.77	7 q	10.75	7
Mohd Azhar Md Ismail	100 m	10.91	9	did not advance	
Harith Ammar Mohd Sobri	200 m	21.75	3 Q	21.46	2nd place, silver medalist(s)
Mohd Shahmimi Azmi	200 m	22.00	7 q	21.72	7
Kannathasan Subramaniam	400 m	48.49	8 q	48.85	7
Mohamad Arif Zulhilmi Alet	400 m	47.86	2 Q	48.23	5
Kesavan Maniam	800 m	—N/a		1:52.24	5
Mohd Jironi Riduan	800 m	—N/a		1:50.98	1st place, gold medalist(s)
Kesavan Maniam	1500 m	—N/a		4:05.90	8
Mohd Jironi Riduan	1500 m	—N/a		3:58.02	1st place, gold medalist(s)
Rayzam Shah Wan Sofian	110 m hurdles	—N/a		14.00	2nd place, silver medalist(s)
Rohaizad Jamil	110 m hurdles	—N/a		14.43	7
Mohamed Baihaqi Razlan	400 m hurdles	53.57	6 q	52.96	4
Muhammad Firdaus Musa	400 m hurdles	53.95	7 q	did not finish	
Eddie Edward Jr; Harith Ammar Mohd Sobri; Mohd Azhar Md Ismail; Mohd Shahmimi Azmi	4 × 100 m relay	—N/a		41.35	4
Kannathasan Subramaniam; Mohamad Arif Zulhilmi Alet; Schzuan Ahmad Rosely; Yuvaraaj Panerselvam	4 × 400 m relay	—N/a		3:15.06	3rd place, bronze medalist(s)
Choon Sieng Lo	20 km walk	—N/a		1:38:15	5
Muhammad Khairil Harith Harun	20 km walk	—N/a		Disqualified	

Field events

Athlete	Event	Qualification		Final	
Athlete	Event	Distance	Position	Distance	Position
Nauraj Singh Randhawa	High jump	—N/a		2.17	1st place, gold medalist(s)
Subramaniam Navinraj	High jump	—N/a		2.09	5
Muhammad Hakimi Ismail	Triple jump	—N/a		16.44 NR	2nd place, silver medalist(s)
Iskandar Alwi	Pole vault	—N/a		5.10 NR	2nd place, silver medalist(s)
Adi Aliffuddin Hussin	Shot put	—N/a		17.10	2nd place, silver medalist(s)
Muhammad Irfan Shamshuddin	Discus throw	—N/a		53.16 NR	1st place, gold medalist(s)
Jackie Wong Siew Cheer	Hammer throw	—N/a		59.75 NR	3rd place, bronze medalist(s)
Micheal Sung Dak Sia	Hammer throw	—N/a		52.72	5

Women
Track and road events

Athlete	Event	Heat		Final	
Athlete	Event	Result	Rank	Result	Rank
Komalam Shally Selvaretnam	100 m	12.31	9	did not advance	
Zaidatul Husna Zulkifli	100 m	12.13	5 q	12.13	5
Komalam Shally Selvaretnam	200 m	25.06	6 q	24.95	7
Zaidatul Husna Zulkifli	200 m	25.17	9	did not advance	
Fatin Faqihah Mohd Yusuf	400 m	58.47	9	did not advance	
Nurul Faizah Asma Mazlan	400 m	58.07	8 q	56.94	7
Raja Nursheena Raja Azhar	100 m hurdles	—N/a		13.84	3rd place, bronze medalist(s)
Komalam Shally Selvaretnam; Nurul Faizah Asma Mazlan; Zaidatul Husna Zulkifli; Zaidatul Husniah Zulkifli	4 × 100 m relay	—N/a		Disqualified	
Fatin Faqihah Mohd Yusuf; Nurulassikin Mohd Rasid; Nurul Faizah Asma Mazlan; Siti Nur Afiqah Abdul Razak	4 × 400 m relay	—N/a		3:45.10	5

Field events

Athlete	Event	Qualification		Final	
Athlete	Event	Distance	Position	Distance	Position
Yap Sean Yee	High jump	—N/a		1.70	4
Noor Amira Mohamad Nafiah	Long jump	—N/a		did not start	
Noor Shahidatun Nadia Mohd Zuki	Long jump	—N/a		did not start	
Noor Amira Mohamad Nafiah	Triple jump	—N/a		No mark	
Nur Fazira Jalaluddin	Hammer throw	—N/a		No mark	
Renee Kelly Lee Casier	Hammer throw	—N/a		53.12	2nd place, silver medalist(s)

== Basketball ==
=== Men's tournament ===
All times are Myanmar Standard Time (UTC+06:30).

Note: Vietnam, Laos, Brunei and Timor-Leste did not participate in the men's competition.

Team	Pld	W	L	PF	PA	PD	Pts
Philippines	6	6	0	580	351	+229	12
Thailand	6	5	1	448	423	+25	11
Singapore	6	4	2	455	367	+88	10
Malaysia	6	3	3	395	381	+14	9
Indonesia	6	2	4	379	369	+10	8
Cambodia	6	1	5	348	503	−155	7
Myanmar	6	0	6	306	517	−211	6

8 December 2013
12:00

Report PDF

Indonesia	53–61	Malaysia
Scoring by quarter: 9–18, 6–15, 22–6, 16–22
Scoring by half: 15–33, 38–28
Pts: Prastawa 24; Rebs: Gemilang 7 Asts: Gemilang 7		Pts: Fai 17; Rebs: Fai 7 Asts: two players 4

Zayar Thiri Indoor Stadium, Naypyidaw
Referees: Yuji Higashi (JPN), Sim Siong Chuan (SIN), Dominique Pomar (PHI)

9 December 2013
12:00

Report PDF

Cambodia	58–73	Malaysia
Scoring by quarter: 11–7, 17–28, 13–17, 17–21
Scoring by half: 28–35, 30–38
Pts: Ratana 22; Rebs: Boroth 20; Asts: Boroth 5		Pts: Fai 16; Rebs: two players 10; Asts: Ban Sin 8

Zayar Thiri Indoor Stadium, Naypyidaw
Referees: Yu Jung (TPE), Haryanto Sutaryo (INA), Naing Phyo Win (MYA)

10 December 2013
14:00

Report PDF

Malaysia	67–71	Singapore
Scoring by quarter: 19–19, 13–19, 19–20, 16–13
Scoring by half: 32–38, 35–33
Pts: Koh Wei 16; Rebs: Kwaan 7 Asts: Ban Sin 6		Pts: W.L. Wong 17; Rebs: W.L. Wong 4 Asts: two players 3

Zayar Thiri Indoor Stadium, Naypyidaw
Referees: Chan Kin Pong (MAC), Yeung Ying Wai (HKG), Maung Linn (MYA)

12 December 2013
10:00

Report PDF

Cambodia	67–80	Malaysia
Scoring by quarter: 16–20, 11–24, 17–20, 23–16
Scoring by half: 27–45, 40–35
Pts: Dominic Dar 41; Rebs: Ratana 8 Asts: Phatara 4		Pts: Kongkum 16; Rebs: Klahan 9 Asts: D.A. Apiromvilaichai 5

Zayar Thiri Indoor Stadium, Naypyidaw
Referees: Kin Pong Chan (MAC), Pick Kieng Ting (MAS), Naing Phyo Win (MYA)

13 December 2013
16:00

Report PDF

Malaysia	69–42	Myanmar
Scoring by quarter: 16–7, 18–8, 16–18, 19–9
Scoring by half: 34–15, 35–27
Pts: Kuek 13; Rebs: Kuek 6 Asts: two players 4		Pts: Jia 8 Rebs: Jia 10; Asts: two players 2

Zayar Thiri Indoor Stadium, Naypyidaw
Referees: Dominique Pomar (PHI), Thongchai Thaweewutsophon (THA), Siong Chuan Sim (SIN)

14 December 2013
12:00

Report PDF

Thailand	73–69	Malaysia
Scoring by quarter: 20–16, 25–16, 15–15, 13–22
Scoring by half: 45–32, 28–37
Pts: Kruatiwa 24; Rebs: Jantuma 10; Asts: Jantuma 6		Pts: Fai 27; Rebs: Kuek 11; Asts: Ban Sin 3

Zayar Thiri Indoor Stadium, Naypyidaw
Referees: Ying Wai Yeung (HKG), Yuji Higashi (JPN), Mr. Herman (INA)

15 December 2013
16:00

Report PDF

Malaysia	56–84	Philippines (gold)
Scoring by quarter: 15-21, 19-22, 15-25, 7-16
Scoring by half: 34-43, 22-41
Pts: Khee Ong 11; Rebs: Kuek 7 Asts: Ban Sin 5		Pts: Parks 18; Rebs: Douthit 7 Asts: Ravena 6

Zayar Thiri Indoor Stadium, Naypyidaw
Referees: Kin Pong Chan (MAC), Haryanto Sutaryo (INA), Linn Maung (MYA)

=== Women's tournament ===
All times are Myanmar Standard Time (UTC+06:30).

Team	Pld	W	L	PF	PA	PD	Pts
Thailand	4	4	0	312	189	+123	8
Philippines	4	3	1	236	210	+26	7
Malaysia	4	2	2	304	217	+87	6
Indonesia	4	1	3	249	241	+8	5
Myanmar	4	0	4	134	378	−244	4

9 December 2013
10:00

Report PDF

Malaysia	59–65	Philippines
Scoring by quarter: 6-19, 17-9, 15-19, 21-18
Scoring by half: 23-28, 36-37
Pts: Goh 14; Rebs: two players 5 Asts: Pang 6		Pts: Arayi 14; Rebs: Almazan 6 Asts: three players 3

Zayar Thiri Indoor Stadium, Naypyidaw
Referees: Kim Bo-Hui (KOR), Yoko Tomita (JPN), Watcharin Padungratchadakit (THA)

12 December 2013
14:00

Report PDF

Myanmar	32–95	Malaysia
Scoring by quarter: 13-30, 2-29, 10-15, 7-21
Scoring by half: 15-59, 17-36
Pts: Thwe 13; Rebs: Lin 7 Asts: Thwe 3		Pts: two players 14; Rebs: two players 9 Asts: Yaakob 7

Zayar Thiri Indoor Stadium, Naypyidaw
Referees: Bohui Kim (KOR), Shuet Mei Ho (SIN), Editha Botecario (PHI)

13 December 2013
10:00

Report PDF

Indonesia	48–81	Malaysia
Scoring by quarter: 15-16, 15-21, 7-18, 11-26
Scoring by half: 30-37, 18-44
Pts: Ibo 14; Rebs: Ibo 12; Asts: Ayuningrum 3		Pts: two players 16; Rebs: Yong 8 Asts: Pang 8

Zayar Thiri Indoor Stadium, Naypyidaw
Referees: Yoko Tomita (JPN), Bohui Kim (KOR), Lwin Soe Soe (MYA)

15 December 2013
12:00

Report PDF

Malaysia	69–72	Thailand
Scoring by quarter: 9-20, 21-18, 18-26, 21-8
Scoring by half: 30-38, 39-34
Pts: Pang 22; Rebs: Pang 10; Asts: two players 4		Pts: Banmoo 20; Rebs: two players 6 Asts: Chirdpetcharat 5

Zayar Thiri Indoor Stadium, Naypyidaw
Referees: Bohui Kim (KOR), Yuji Higashi (JPN), Editha Botecario (PHI)

== Football ==
=== Men's tournament ===
Group A

On 6 November, Philippines which was originally drawn in Group A, withdrew from the SEA Games men's football competition.

Team	Pld	W	D	L	GF	GA	GD	Pts
Malaysia	4	3	1	0	9	3	+6	10
Singapore	4	2	2	0	5	2	+3	8
Vietnam	4	2	0	2	13	3	+10	6
Laos	4	1	1	2	5	12	−7	4
Brunei	4	0	0	4	2	14	−12	0

10 December 2013
16:00

Brunei	0–3	Malaysia
	Report	Rozaimi 31'; Ashri 71'; Roy 89'

Zayarthiri Stadium, Naypyidaw
Referee: Vichhika Tuy (Cambodia)

13 December 2013
16:00

Malaysia	4–1	Laos
Roy 7', 60', 87'; Souksavanh 80' (o.g.)	Report	Vongchiengkham 41'

Zayarthiri Stadium, Naypyidaw
Referee: Sgt. Win Cho (Myanmar)

15 December 2013
16:00

Singapore	1–1	Malaysia
Afiq 62'	Report	Rozaimi 90+1'

Zayarthiri Stadium, Naypyidaw
Referee: Wang Zhe (China)

17 December 2013
16:00

Malaysia	2–1	Vietnam
Ashri 82'; Saarvindran 90+1'	Report	Mạc Hồng Quân 90+4'

Zayarthiri Stadium, Naypyidaw
Referee: Wang Zhe (China)

Semifinal

19 December 2013
16:00

Malaysia	1–1 (a.e.t.)	Indonesia
Thamil 86'	Report	Bayu 32'
Penalties
Thamil (penalty missed); Shahrul (penalty missed); Nazmi (penalty scored); Fadhli (penalty scored); Rozaimi (penalty scored)	3–4	(penalty scored) Alfin; (penalty scored) Diego; (penalty missed) Lestusen; (penalty scored) Yandi; (penalty scored) Pahabol

Zayarthiri Stadium, Naypyidaw
Referee: Ko Hyung-Jin (South Korea)

Bronze medal match

21 December 2013
16:00

Malaysia	1–2	Singapore
Thamil 68'	Report	Hariss 13', 14'

Zayarthiri Stadium, Naypyidaw
Referee: Sgt. Win Cho (Myanmar)

=== Women's tournament ===
Group B

On 22 November, Timor-Leste which was originally drawn in Group B, withdrew from the SEA Games women's football competition.

Team	Pld	W	D	L	GF	GA	GD	Pts
Thailand	2	2	0	0	11	1	+10	6
Malaysia	2	1	0	1	4	7	−3	3
Laos	2	0	0	2	1	8	−7	0

12 December 2013
16:00

Laos	1–3	Malaysia
Noum 74'	Report	Angela 2', 9'; Sihaya 68'

Mandalarthiri Stadium, Mandalay
Referee: Mai Hoang Trang (Vietnam)

14 December 2013
16:00

Malaysia	1–6	Thailand
Sihaya 78'	Report	Anootsara 16', 45'; Ainon 52'; Darut 58'; Kwanreuthai 88', 90+2'

Mandalarthiri Stadium, Mandalay
Referee: He Jin (China)

Semifinal

18 December 2013
16:00

Vietnam	4–0	Malaysia
Nguyễn Thị Minh Nguyệt 11', 64'; Nguyễn Thị Tuyết Dung 55'; Huỳnh Như 77'	Report

Mandalarthiri Stadium, Mandalay
Referee: He Jin (China)

Bronze medal match

20 December 2013
16:00

Malaysia	0–6	Myanmar
	Report	Yee Yee Oo 25', 70'; Khin Moe Wai 39'; Than Than Htwe 40'; San San Maw 83'; Myint Myint Aye 90+3'

Mandalarthiri Stadium, Mandalay
Referee: Pannipar Kamnueng (Thailand)

== Indoor volleyball ==
=== Men's tournament ===
Group A

Pos	Team	Pld	W	L	Pts	SW	SL	SR	SPW	SPL	SPR	Qualification
1	Thailand	3	3	0	9	9	0	MAX	225	155	1.452	Semifinals
2	Myanmar	3	2	1	6	6	3	2.000	210	180	1.167	Semifinals
3	Malaysia	3	1	2	3	3	7	0.429	186	224	0.830	
4	Cambodia	3	0	3	0	1	9	0.111	185	247	0.749	

Date		Score		Set 1	Set 2	Set 3	Set 4	Set 5	Total
13 Dec	Thailand	3–0	Malaysia	25–8	25–12	25–18			75–38
15 Dec	Myanmar	3–0	Malaysia	25–15	25–21	25–15			75-51
17 Dec	Malaysia	3–1	Cambodia	22–25	25–17	25–18	25–14		97–74

Fifth and sixth place match

Date		Score		Set 1	Set 2	Set 3	Set 4	Set 5	Total
20 Dec	Malaysia	2–3	Laos	20–25	25–23	26–24	22–25	16–18	109–115

=== Women's tournament ===
Group stage

Pos	Team	Pld	W	L	Pts	SW	SL	SR	SPW	SPL	SPR	Qualification
1	Thailand	4	4	0	12	12	0	MAX	300	168	1.786	Gold Medal match
2	Vietnam	4	3	1	9	9	3	3.000	281	193	1.456	Gold Medal match
3	Indonesia	4	2	2	6	6	7	0.857	276	252	1.095	
4	Myanmar	4	1	3	3	4	12	0.333	208	301	0.691	
5	Malaysia	4	0	4	0	0	12	0.000	149	300	0.497	

Date		Score		Set 1	Set 2	Set 3	Set 4	Set 5	Total
13 Dec	Myanmar	3–0	Malaysia	25–17	25–17	25–22			75–56
14 Dec	Thailand	3–0	Malaysia	25–12	25–9	25–9			75–30
17 Dec	Malaysia	0–3	Vietnam	9-25	10-25	12-25			31-75
18 Dec	Malaysia	0–3	Indonesia	13-25	10-25	9-25			32-75
