= Swimming at the 2013 SEA Games – Women's 4 × 100 metre medley relay =

The Women's 4 x 100 metre medley relay event at the 2013 SEA Games took place on 13 December 2013 at Wunna Theikdi Aquatics Centre.

There were 5 teams who took part in this event. Singapore won the gold medal, Thailand and Malaysia won the silver and bronze medal respectively.

== Schedule ==
All times are Myanmar Standard Time (UTC+06:30)

Date	Time	Event
Sunday, 15 December 2013	19:04	Final

== Records ==
Prior to this competition, the existing world, Asian, and Southeast Asian Games records were as follows.

World Record	United States	3:52.05	London, United Kingdom	4 August 2012
Asian Record	China	3:52.19	Rome, Italy	1 August 2009
Games Record	Singapore	4:10.38	Vientiane, Laos	13 December 2009

== Results ==
Rank	Lane	Team	Time	Notes
1st place, gold medalist(s)	6	Singapore (SIN)	4:13.02	
		Tao Li	1:03.56	
		Samantha Yeo	1:12.42	
		Quah Ting Wen	1:00.84	
		Amanda Lim	56.20	
2nd place, silver medalist(s)	2	Thailand (THA)	4:15.52	
		Natthanan Junkrajang	1:04.77	
		Chavunnooch Salubluek	1:11.98	
		Supasuta Sounthornchote	1:02.05	
		Benjaporn Sriphanomthorn	56.72	
3rd place, bronze medalist(s)	5	Malaysia (MAS)	4:17.77	
		Erika Kong	1:07.90	
		Christina Loh	1:09.94	
		Yap Siew Hui	1:00.84	
		Khoo Cai Lin	59.09	
4	4	Indonesia (INA)	4:20.96	
		Nurul Fajar Fitriyati	1:05.36	
		Margareta Kretapradani	1:13.48	
		Monalisa Arieswaty Lorenza	1:02.73	
		Sagita Putri Krisdewanti	59.39	
5	3	Myanmar (MYA)	4:50.05	
		Thiri Nandar	1:15.32	
		Ei Ei Thet	1:20.99	
		Su Moe Theint San	1:08.68	
		K Zin Win	1:05.06	
