= Swimming at the 2013 SEA Games – Men's 100 metre backstroke =

The Men's 100 metre backstroke event at the 2013 SEA Games took place on 14 December 2013 at Wunna Theikdi Aquatics Centre.

There were 11 competitors from 7 countries who took part in this event. Two heats were held. The heat in which a swimmer competed did not formally matter for advancement, as the swimmers with the top eight times from both field qualified for the finals.

== Schedule ==
All times are Myanmar Standard Time (UTC+06:30)

Date	Time	Event
Thursday, 14 December 2013	09:14	Heats
Thursday, 14 December 2013	18:21	Final

== Records ==
Prior to this competition, the existing world, Asian, and Southeast Asian Games records were as follows.

World Record	Aaron Peirsol (USA)	51.94	Indianapolis, United States	8 July 2009
Asian Record	Ryosuke Irie (JPN)	52.24	Kumamoto, Japan	5 September 2009
Games Record	I Gede Siman Sudartawa (INA)	55.59	Palembang, Indonesia	15 November 2011

== Results ==
=== Heats ===
Rank	Heat	Lane	Athlete	Time	Notes
1	2	6	Kasipat Chograthin (THA)	58.45	Q
2	2	4	I Gede Siman Sudartawa (INA)	58.79	Q
3	2	3	Tern Jian Han (MAS)	59.25	Q
4	1	4	Quah Zheng Wen (SIN)	1:00.31	Q
5	2	5	Kai Wee Rainer Ng (SIN)	1:00.60	Q
6	1	5	Tran Duy Khoi (VIE)	1:00.70	Q
7	1	3	Ricky Anggawijaya (INA)	1:01.00	Q
8	2	2	Aung Myo Oo (MYA)	1:04.07	Q
9	1	6	Seree Phansomboon (THA)	1:07.50	
10	2	7	Thol Thoeun (CAM)	1:11.61	
11	1	2	Ahnt Khaung Htut (MYA)	1:12.79	

=== Final ===
Rank	Lane	Athlete	Time	Notes
1st place, gold medalist(s)	5	I Gede Siman Sudartawa (INA)	55.80	
2nd place, silver medalist(s)	6	Quah Zheng Wen (SIN)	56.11	
3rd place, bronze medalist(s)	1	Ricky Anggawijaya (INA)	57.27	
4	2	Kai Wee Rainer Ng (SIN)	57.64	
5	4	Kasipat Chograthin (THA)	57.83	
6	3	Tern Jian Han (MAS)	58.07	
7	7	Tran Duy Khoi (VIE)	58.59	
8	8	Aung Myo Oo (MYA)	1:04.20	
