= Athletics at the 2013 SEA Games – Men's pole vault =

The men's pole vault at the 2013 SEA Games, the athletics was held in Naypyidaw, Myanmar. The track and field events took place at the Wunna Theikdi Stadiumon December 16.

== Schedule ==
All times are Myanmar Standard Time (UTC+06:30)

Date	Time	Event
Monday, 16 December 2013	14:00	Final

== Records ==
Prior to this competition, the existing world, Asian, and Southeast Asian Games records were as follows.

World Record	Sergey Bubka (UKR)	6.14	Sestriere, Italy	31 July 1994
Asian Record	Grigoriy Yegorov (KAZ); Grigoriy Yegorov (KAZ); Igor Potapovich (KAZ)	5.90	Stuttgart, Germany; London, United Kingdom; Nice, France	19 August 1993; 10 September 1993; 10 July 1996
Games Record	Kreeta Sintawacheewa (THA)	5.21	Vientiane, Laos	16 December 2009

== Results ==
Legend

- NM — No Mark

Rank	Athlete	Result	Notes
1st place, gold medalist(s)	Kreeta Sintawacheewa (THA)	5.15	
2nd place, silver medalist(s)	Iskandar Alwi (MAS)	5.10	NR
3rd place, bronze medalist(s)	Sompong Saombankuay (THA)	5.00	
4	Ernest John Obiena (PHI)	4.90	
5	Zi Qing Sean Lim (SIN)	4.80	
5	Vu Van Huyen (VIE)	4.80	=NR
7	Henri Setyawan (INA)	4.80	
8	Sheng Yao Chan (SIN)	4.60	
9	Htun Htun Lin (MYA)	4.40	
10	Myo Min Ping (MYA)	4.40	
