= Athletics at the 2013 SEA Games – Men's 4 × 400 metres relay =

The men's 4 × 400 metres relay at the 2013 SEA Games, the athletics was held in Naypyidaw, Myanmar. The track and field events took place at the Wunna Theikdi Stadiumon December 19.

== Schedule ==
All times are Myanmar Standard Time (UTC+06:30)

Date	Time	Event
Thursday, 19 December 2013	16:30	Final

== Records ==
Prior to this competition, the existing world, Asian, and Southeast Asian Games records were as follows.

World Record	United States	2:54.29	Stuttgart, Germany	22 August 1993
Asian Record	Japan	3:00.76	Atlanta, United States	3 August 1996
Games Record	Thailand	3:05.47	Chiang Mai, Thailand	15 December 1995

== Results ==
Rank	Lane	Nation	Competitors	Time	Notes
1st place, gold medalist(s)	8	Philippines (PHI)	Isidro Jr Del Prado, Edgardo Jr Alejan, Jullius Felicisimo Nierras, Sarchand Christian Bagsit	3:09.32	
2nd place, silver medalist(s)	3	Thailand (THA)	Treenate Krittanukulwong, Wannasa Srikharin, Saharat Sammayan, Khanom Nattapong	3:09.81	
3rd place, bronze medalist(s)	6	Malaysia (MAS)	Schzuan Ahmad Rosely, Mohamad Arif Zulhilmi Alet, Yuvaraaj Panerselvam, Kannanthasan Subramaniam	3:15.06	
4	4	Indonesia (INA)	Yakobus Leuwol, Heru Astriyanto, Deni Hadiwizaya, Edy Ariansyah	3:15.60	
5	7	Singapore (SIN)	Seng Song Poh, Zubin Percy Muncherji, Chin Hui Ng, Kian Seong Kenneth Khoo	3:18.65	
6	2	Myanmar (MYA)	Thet Zaw Win, Kyaw Zin Aung, Kyaw Zin Oo, Zaw Lwin Htoo	3:22.28	
