= Swimming at the 2013 SEA Games – Women's 100 metre breaststroke =

The Women's 100 metre breaststroke event at the 2013 SEA Games took place on 13 December 2013 at Wunna Theikdi Aquatics Centre.

There were 11 competitors from 6 countries who took part in this event. Two heats were held. The heat in which a swimmer competed did not formally matter for advancement, as the swimmers with the top eight times from both field qualified for the finals.

== Schedule ==
All times are Myanmar Standard Time (UTC+06:30)

Date	Time	Event
Thursday, 13 December 2013	09:04	Heats
Thursday, 13 December 2013	18:12	Final

== Records ==
Prior to this competition, the existing world, Asian, and Southeast Asian Games records were as follows.

World Record	Rūta Meilutytė (LTU)	1:04.35	Barcelona, Spain	29 July 2013
Asian Record	Ji Liping (CHN)	1:05.32	Beijing, China	29 August 2009
Games Record	Siow Yi Ting (MAS)	1:09.82	Vientiane, Laos	11 December 2009

== Results ==
=== Heats ===
Rank	Heat	Lane	Athlete	Time	Notes
1	2	4	Christina Loh (MAS)	1:12.51	Q
2	1	5	Chavunnooch Salubluek (THA)	1:12.54	Q
3	1	4	Samantha Yeo (SIN)	1:13.09	Q
4	2	3	Margareta Kretapradani (INA)	1:14.49	Q
5	2	5	Phiangkhwan Pawapotako (THA)	1:14.62	Q
6	2	6	Cheryl Lim (SIN)	1:15.09	Q
7	1	3	Nadia Adrianna Redza Goh (MAS)	1:15.86	Q
8	1	6	Kavita Chrishna Sulistyaning (INA)	1:17.00	Q
9	2	2	Ngo Thi Ngoc Quynh (VIE)	1:18.07	
10	2	7	Su Moe Theint San (MYA)	1:20.47	
11	1	2	Ei Ei Thet (MYA)	1:20.79	

=== Final ===
Rank	Lane	Athlete	Time	Notes
1st place, gold medalist(s)	4	Christina Loh (MAS)	1:10.55	
2nd place, silver medalist(s)	5	Chavunnooch Salubluek (THA)	1:11.35	
3rd place, bronze medalist(s)	2	Phiangkhwan Pawapotako (THA)	1:12.68	
4	3	Samantha Yeo (SIN)	1:12.79	
5	6	Margareta Kretapradani (INA)	1:14.21	
6	1	Nadia Adrianna Redza Goh (MAS)	1:15.33	
7	7	Cheryl Lim (SIN)	1:15.98	
8	8	Kavita Chrishna Sulistyaning (INA)	1:16.85	
