= Swimming at the 2013 SEA Games – Women's 400 metre individual medley =

The Women's 400 metre individual medley event at the 2013 SEA Games took place on 16 December 2013 at Wunna Theikdi Aquatics Centre.

There were 8 competitors from 5 countries who took part in this event. No Qualification was held since only 8 swimmers competed.

== Schedule ==
All times are Myanmar Standard Time (UTC+06:30)

Date	Time	Event
Monday, 16 December 2013	18:00	Final

== Records ==
Prior to this competition, the existing world, Asian, and Southeast Asian Games records were as follows.

World Record	Ye Shiwen (CHN)	4:28.43	London, United Kingdom	28 July 2012
Asian Record	Ye Shiwen (CHN)	4:28.43	London, United Kingdom	28 July 2012
Games Record	Natthanan Junkrajang (THA)	4:50.88	Palembang, Indonesia	13 November 2011

== Results ==
=== Final ===
Rank	Lane	Athlete	Time	Notes
1st place, gold medalist(s)	4	Nguyen Thi Anh Vien (VIE)	4:46.16	GR
2nd place, silver medalist(s)	3	Ressa Kania Dewi (INA)	4:59.49	
3rd place, bronze medalist(s)	7	Meagan Lim (SIN)	5:01.74	
4	6	Erika Chia Chia Kong (MAS)	5:03.44	
5	2	Le Thi My Thao (VIE)	5:09.61	
6	1	Nadia Adrianna Redza Goh (MAS)	5:09.83	
7	5	Benjaporn Sriphanomthorn (THA)	5:12.54	
—	8	Hannah Dato (PHI)	DNS	
