= Swimming at the 2013 SEA Games – Men's 200 metre butterfly =

The 'Men's 200 metre butterfly event at the 2013 SEA Games took place on 16 December 2013 at Wunna Theikdi Aquatics Centre.

There were 11 competitors from 7 countries who took part in this event. Two heats were held. The heat in which a swimmer competed did not formally matter for advancement, as the swimmers with the top eight times from both field qualified for the finals.

== Schedule ==
All times are Myanmar Standard Time (UTC+06:30)

Date	Time	Event
Thursday, 14 December 2013	09:07	Heats
Thursday, 14 December 2013	18:28	Final

== Records ==
Prior to this competition, the existing world, Asian, and Southeast Asian Games records were as follows.

World Record	Michael Phelps (USA)	1:51.51	Rome, Italy	29 July 2009
Asian Record	Takeshi Matsuda (JPN)	1:52.97	Beijing, China	13 August 2008
Games Record	Joseph Schooling (SIN)	1:56.67	Palembang, Indonesia	15 November 2011

== Results ==
=== Heats ===
Rank	Heat	Lane	Athlete	Time	Notes
1	2	3	Lee Jeau Zhi Vernon (MAS)	2:06.06	Q
2	1	6	Matt Louis Navata (PHI)	2:06.90	Q
3	2	4	Joseph Schooling (SIN)	2:06.99	Q
4	1	4	Quah Zheng Wen (SIN)	2:07.08	Q
5	1	5	Phan Lam Yen (VIE)	2:07.68	Q
6	2	5	Tanakrit Kittiya (THA)	2:07.99	Q
7	2	6	Phan Gia Man (VIE)	2:08.99	Q
8	2	2	Rodrick Luhur (INA)	2:09.48	Q
9	1	3	Siwat Matangkapong (THA)	2:13.39	
10	2	7	Thiha Aung (MYA)	2:16.18	
11	1	2	Putera Muhammad Randa (INA)	2:22.95	

=== Final ===
Rank	Lane	Athlete	Time	Notes
1st place, gold medalist(s)	3	Joseph Schooling (SIN)	1:59.46	
2nd place, silver medalist(s)	6	Quah Zheng Wen (SIN)	2:01.65	
3rd place, bronze medalist(s)	5	Matt Louis Navata (PHI)	2:04.20	
4	4	Lee Jeau Zhi Vernon (MAS)	2:05.51	
5	2	Phan Lam Yen (VIE)	2:07.71	
6	8	Rodrick Luhur (INA)	2:08.04	
7	1	Phan Gia Man (VIE)	2:10.17	
—	1	Tanakrit Kittiya (THA)	DSQ	
