= Swimming at the 2013 SEA Games – Men's 200 metre breaststroke =

The Men's 200 metre breaststroke event at the 2013 SEA Games took place on 15 December 2013 at Wunna Theikdi Aquatics Centre.

There were 14 competitors from 8 countries who took part in this event. Two heats were held. The heat in which a swimmer competed did not formally matter for advancement, as the swimmers with the top eight times from both field qualified for the finals.

== Schedule ==
All times are Myanmar Standard Time (UTC+06:30)

Date	Time	Event
Thursday, 15 December 2013	09:08	Heats
Thursday, 15 December 2013	18:18	Final

== Records ==
Prior to this competition, the existing world, Asian, and Southeast Asian Games records were as follows.

World Record	Akihiro Yamaguchi (JPN)	2:07.01	Gifu, Gifu, Japan	15 September 2012
Asian Record	Akihiro Yamaguchi (JPN)	2:07.01	Gifu, Gifu, Japan	15 September 2012
Games Record	Nuttapong Ketin (THA)	2:12.99	Palembang, Indonesia	12 November 2011

== Results ==
=== Heats ===
Rank	Heat	Lane	Athlete	Time	Notes
1	1	4	Nuttapong Ketin (THA)	2:20.05	Q
2	2	3	Yap See Tuan (MAS)	2:21.12	Q
3	1	3	Dennis Josua Tiwa (INA)	2:21.24	Q
4	2	2	Joshua Hall (PHI)	2:21.85	Q
5	1	5	Huynh The Vi (VIE)	2:22.44	Q
6	1	6	Radomyos Matjiur (THA)	2:22.70	Q
7	2	7	Christopher Ee Hong Cheong (SIN)	2:23.15	Q
8	2	5	Indra Gunawan (INA)	2:23.21	Q
9	1	2	Phan Gia Man (VIE)	2:24.43	
10	1	1	Tin Kyaw Lin (MYA)	2:38.90	
11	1	7	Sein Win Ryan (MYA)	2:39.92	
12	2	1	Thonponloeu Hem (CAM)	2:43.15	
-	2	6	Shaun Yap (MAS)	DSQ	
-	2	4	Banjo Borja (PHI)	DNS	

=== Final ===
Rank	Lane	Athlete	Time	Notes
1st place, gold medalist(s)	4	Nuttapong Ketin (THA)	2:13.32	
2nd place, silver medalist(s)	7	Radomyos Matjiur (THA)	2:17.77	
3rd place, bronze medalist(s)	5	Yap See Tuan (MAS)	2:18.57	
4	6	Joshua Hall (PHI)	2:18.72	
5	8	Indra Gunawan (INA)	2:21.20	
6	1	Christopher Ee Hong Cheong (SIN)	2:21.99	
7	2	Huynh The Vi (VIE)	2:22.51	
8	3	Dennis Josua Tiwa (INA)	2:26.35	
