= Swimming at the 2013 SEA Games – Men's 1500 metre freestyle =

The Men's 1500 metre freestyle event at the 2013 SEA Games took place on 15 December 2013 at Wunna Theikdi Aquatics Centre.

There were 11 competitors from 7 countries who took part in this event. 8 swimmers with the fast qualifying time were in the fast heat, the others were in the slow heat. The final ranking was arranged by the times from both heats.

== Schedule ==
All times are Myanmar Standard Time (UTC+06:30)

Date	Time	Event
Sunday, 15 December 2013	09:20	Final 1
Sunday, 15 December 2013	?	Final 2

== Records ==
Prior to this competition, the existing world, Asian, and Southeast Asian Games records were as follows.

World Record	Sun Yang (CHN)	14:31.02	London, United Kingdom	4 August 2012
Asian Record	Sun Yang (CHN)	14:31.02	London, United Kingdom	4 August 2012
Games Record	Ryan Arabejo (PHI)	15:37.75	Vientiane, Laos	13 December 2009

== Results ==
Rank	Heat	Lane	Athlete	Time	Notes
1st place, gold medalist(s)	2	6	Lam Quang Nhat (VIE)	15:39.44	
2nd place, silver medalist(s)	2	4	Kevin Yeap (MAS)	15:45.89	
3rd place, bronze medalist(s)	2	2	Welson Sim (MAS)	15:57.98	
4	2	5	Tanakrit Kittiya (THA)	16:10.87	
5	2	3	Teo Zhen Ren (SIN)	16:10.97	
6	1	4	Siwat Matangkapong (THA)	16:14.97	
7	2	8	Rodrick Luhur (INA)	16:24.39	
8	2	1	Ricky Anggawijaya (INA)	16:29.93	
9	1	3	Ahnt Khaung Htut (MYA)	19:02.47	
—	1	5	Fahad Al-Khaldi (PHI)	DNS	
—	2	7	Pang Sheng Jun (SIN)	DNS	
