= Swimming at the 2013 SEA Games – Men's 200 metre freestyle =

Swimming – Men's 200 metre freestyle at the 2013 SEA Games
- Venue: Wunna Theikdi Aquatics Centre
- Date: 16 December 2013
- Winning time: 1:50.64

Medalists
gold medal	Hoàng Quý Phước	Vietnam
silver medal	Daniel Bego	Malaysia
bronze medal	Quah Zheng Wen	Singapore

The men's 200 metre freestyle event at the 2013 SEA Games took place on 16 December 2013 at Wunna Theikdi Aquatics Centre.

There were 15 competitors from 8 countries who took part in this event. Two heats were held, and the swimmers with the top eight times from both field qualified for the finals.

== Schedule ==
All times are Myanmar Standard Time (UTC+06:30)

Date	Time	Event
Monday, 16 December 2013	09:00	Heats
Monday, 16 December 2013	18:11	Final

== Records ==
Prior to this competition, the existing world, Asian, and Southeast Asian Games records were as follows.

World Record	Paul Biedermann (GER)	1:42.00	Rome, Italy	28 July 2009
Asian Record	Sun Yang (CHN)	1:44.47	Shenyang, China	6 September 2013
Games Record	Daniel Bego (MAS)	1:49.22	Vientiane, Laos	14 December 2009

== Results ==
=== Heats ===
Rank	Heat	Lane	Athlete	Time	Notes
1	2	3	Daniel Bego (MAS)	1:57.10	Q
2	2	5	Quah Zheng Wen (SIN)	1:57.25	Q
3	2	4	Lim Ching Hwang (MAS)	1:57.32	Q
4	2	2	Alexis Wijaya Ohmar (INA)	1:57.38	Q
5	1	4	Hoang Quy Phuoc (VIE)	1:57.48	Q
6	1	6	Sarit Tiewong (THA)	1:57.91	Q
7	1	3	Jessie Khing Lacuna (PHI)	1:58.02	Q
8	1	2	Ricky Anggawijaya (INA)	1:58.28	Q
9	1	7	Pham Thanh Nguyen (VIE)	1:59.00	
10	2	1	Win Htet Oo (MYA)	2:00.89	
11	2	6	Tanakrit Kittiya (THA)	2:02.34	
12	1	1	Min Thu Kha (MYA)	2:05.89	
13	2	8	Chamraen Youri Maximov (CAM)	2:13.79	
—	2	7	Fahad Al-Khaldi (PHI)	DNS	
—	1	5	Danny Yeo (SIN)	DNS	

=== Final ===
Rank	Lane	Athlete	Time	Notes
1st place, gold medalist(s)	2	Hoang Quy Phuoc (VIE)	1:50.64	
2nd place, silver medalist(s)	4	Daniel Bego (MAS)	1:51.10	
3rd place, bronze medalist(s)	5	Quah Zheng Wen (SIN)	1:51.66	
4	1	Jessie Khing Lacuna (PHI)	1:52.33	
5	7	Sarit Tiewong (THA)	1:53.29	
6	3	Lim Ching Hwang (MAS)	1:54.03	
7	8	Ricky Anggawijaya (INA)	1:54.82	
8	6	Alexis Wijaya Ohmar (INA)	1:55.02	
