= Swimming at the 2013 SEA Games – Men's 400 metre freestyle =

The Men's 400 metre freestyle event at the 2013 SEA Games took place on 14 December 2013 at Wunna Theikdi Aquatics Centre.

There were 12 competitors from 7 countries who took part in this event. Two heats were held. The heat in which a swimmer competed did not formally matter for advancement, as the swimmers with the top eight times from both field qualified for the finals.

== Schedule ==
All times are Myanmar Standard Time (UTC+06:30)

Date	Time	Event
Thursday, 14 December 2013	09:00	Heats
Thursday, 14 December 2013	18:00	Final

== Records ==
Prior to this competition, the existing world, Asian, and Southeast Asian Games records were as follows.

World Record	Paul Biedermann (GER)	3:40.07	Rome, Italy	26 July 2009
Asian Record	Sun Yang (CHN)	3:40.14	London, United Kingdom	28 July 2012
Games Record	Daniel Bego (MAS)	3:53.99	Vientiane, Laos	12 December 2009

== Results ==
=== Heats ===
Rank	Heat	Lane	Athlete	Time	Notes
1	2	4	Kevin Soon Choy Yeap (MAS)	4:04.76	Q
2	1	5	Hoang Quy Phuoc (VIE)	4:06.48	Q
3	1	4	Daniel Bego (MAS)	4:06.68	Q
4	1	2	Sarit Tiewong (THA)	4:06.77	Q
5	2	3	Pang Sheng Jun (SIN)	4:06.96	Q
6	2	5	Tanakrit Kattiya (THA)	4:07.94	Q
7	1	3	Pham Thanh Nguyen (VIE)	4:09.85	Q
8	2	6	Teo Zhen Ren (SIN)	4:12.01	Q
9	1	6	Ricky Anggawijaya (INA)	4:21.42	
10	2	7	Min Thu Kha (MYA)	4:29.06	
11	1	7	Htein Linn Soe (MYA)	4:43.10	
-	2	2	Fahad Al-Khaldi (PHI)	DNS	

=== Final ===
Rank	Lane	Athlete	Time	Notes
1st place, gold medalist(s)	3	Daniel Bego (MAS)	3:54.89	
2nd place, silver medalist(s)	5	Hoang Quy Phuoc (VIE)	3:57.73	
3rd place, bronze medalist(s)	7	Tanakrit Kattiya (THA)	3:59.00	
4	6	Sarit Tiewong (THA)	3:59.22	
5	4	Kevin Soon Choy Yeap (MAS)	4:00.75	
6	8	Teo Zhen Ren (SIN)	4:01.44	
7	2	Pang Sheng Jun (SIN)	4:05.07	
8	1	Pham Thanh Nguyen (VIE)	4:07.34	
