= Athletics at the 2013 SEA Games – Men's discus throw =

The men's discus throw at the 2013 SEA Games, the athletics was held in Naypyidaw, Myanmar. The track and field events is taking place at the Wunna Theikdi Stadiumon December 15.

== Schedule ==
All times are Myanmar Standard Time (UTC+06:30)

Date	Time	Event
Sunday, 15 December 2013	10:00	Final

== Records ==
Prior to this competition, the existing world, Asian, and Southeast Asian Games records were as follows.

World Record	Jürgen Schult (GDR)	74.08 m	Neubrandenburg, East Germany	6 June 1986
Asian Record	Ehsan Haddadi (IRI)	69.32 m	Tallinn, Estonia	3 June 2008
Games Record	Wong Tuck Yim (SIN)	59.50 m	Bandar Seri Begawan, Brunei Darussalam	8 August 1999

== Results ==
Legend

- X — Failure

Rank	Athlete	Attempts						Result	Notes
Rank	Athlete	1	2	3	4	5	6	Result	Notes
1st place, gold medalist(s)	Muhammad Irfan Shamshuddin (MAS)	?	?	?	?	?	?	53.16	NR
2nd place, silver medalist(s)	Narong Benjaroon (THA)	?	?	?	?	?	?	52.45	
3rd place, bronze medalist(s)	Hermanto Hermanto (INA)	?	?	?	?	?	?	51.96	
4	Kwanchai Numsomboon (THA)	?	?	?	?	?	?	51.71	
5	Tuck Yim Wong (SIN)	?	?	?	?	?	?	50.82	
6	De Ye Wu (MYA)	?	?	?	?	?	?	43.68	
7	Aung Naing Myo (MYA)	?	?	?	?	?	?	37.33	
