= Swimming at the 2013 SEA Games – Men's 4 × 100 metre freestyle relay =

The Men's 4 x 100 metre freestyle relay event at the 2013 SEA Games took place on 14 December 2013 at Wunna Theikdi Aquatics Centre.

There were 6 teams who took part in this event. Singapore won the gold medal, Malaysia and Thailand won the silver and bronze medal respectively.

== Schedule ==
All times are Myanmar Standard Time (UTC+06:30)

Date	Time	Event
Thursday, 14 December 2013	19:13	Final

== Records ==
Prior to this competition, the existing world, Asian, and Southeast Asian Games records were as follows.

World Record	United States	3:08.24	Beijing, China	11 August 2008
Asian Record	Japan	3:14.73	Hong Kong, Hong Kong	8 December 2009
Games Record	Singapore	3:23.22	Vientiane, Laos	12 December 2009

== Results ==
Rank	Lane	Nation	Swimmers	Time	Notes
1st place, gold medalist(s)	2	Singapore (SIN)	Clement Lim (50.68); Danny Yeo (50.57); Darren Lim (50.77); Joseph Schooling (49.72)	3:21.74	GR
2nd place, silver medalist(s)	3	Malaysia (MAS)	Lim Ching Hwang (51.86); Welson Sim (52.25); Vernon Lee (52.00); Daniel Bego (50.87)	3:26.98	
3rd place, bronze medalist(s)	7	Thailand (THA)	Napat Wesshasartar (51.88); Papungkorn Ingkanont (52.75); Cholawat Phoduang (51.15); Sarit Tiewong (51.39)	3:27.17	
4	6	Myanmar (MYA)	Win Htet Oo (52.96); Min Thu Kha (56.43); Thiha Aung (57.27); Ye Myint Hein (54.28)	3:40.94	
-	4	Cambodia (CAM)	Thonponleu Hem; Ratha Phin; Thol Thoeun; Chamraen Youri Maximov	DSQ	
-	5	Indonesia (INA)	Triady Fauzi Sidiq; Alexis Wijaya Ohmar; Glenn Victor Sutanto; Guntur Pratama Putera	DSQ	
