= Diving at the 2013 SEA Games – Men's 3 metre springboard =

The men's 3 metre platform diving competition at the 2013 SEA Games took place in Naypyidaw, Myanmar on 19 December at the Wunna Theikdi Aquatics Centre.

== Schedule ==
All times are Myanmar Standard Time (UTC+06:30)

Date	Time	Event
Thursday, 19 December 2013	15:00	Final

== Results ==
Legend

- DNF — Did not finish
- DNS — Did not start

Rank	Athlete	Dives						Total
Rank	Athlete	1	2	3	4	5	6	Total
1st place, gold medalist(s)	Ooi Tze Liang (MAS)	69.75	75.90	80.50	74.80	61.25	69.70	431.90
2nd place, silver medalist(s)	Lee Mark Han Ming (SIN)	49.20	54.00	60.45	49.50	54.00	57.00	324.15
3rd place, bronze medalist(s)	Chew Yi Wei (MAS)	72.85	57.00	34.00	43.75	59.50	45.60	314.20
4	Timothy Han Kuan Lee (SIN)	58.50	29.45	58.50	54.00	55.50	56.00	311.95
5	Suchart Pichi (THA)	57.00	60.45	52.50	48.00	47.85	41.25	307.05
6	Akhmad Sukran Jamjami (INA)	60.00	40.30	61.50	60.00	35.70	40.80	298.30
7	Naung Kyar (MYA)	43.20	51.80	31.05	42.00	48.00	36.00	252.05
8	Zwe Thet Oo (MYA)	42.00	43.20	36.00	41.85	42.00	35.00	240.05
