= Diving at the 2013 SEA Games – Women's 3 metre springboard =

The women's 3 metre platform diving competition at the 2013 SEA Games took place in Naypyidaw, Myanmar on 18 December at the Wunna Theikdi Aquatics Centre.

== Schedule ==
All times are Myanmar Standard Time (UTC+06:30)

Date	Time	Event
Wednesday, 18 December 2013	15:00	Final

== Results ==
Legend

- DNF — Did not finish
- DNS — Did not start

Rank	Athlete	Dives					Total
Rank	Athlete	1	2	3	4	5	Total
1st place, gold medalist(s)	Cheong Jun Hoong (MAS)	60.75	58.80	69.00	69.00	69.60	327.15
2nd place, silver medalist(s)	Ng Yan Yee (MAS)	63.00	65.10	63.00	69.00	63.00	323.10
3rd place, bronze medalist(s)	Eka Purnama Indah (INA)	44.55	50.40	54.60	47.60	43.20	240.35
4	Lee Myra Jia Wen (SIN)	48.00	51.30	50.40	37.80	45.60	233.10
5	Fong Kay Yian (SIN)	50.40	55.35	57.40	9.80	45.60	218.55
6	Dewi Setyaningsih (INA)	46.80	43.20	46.50	40.60	41.00	218.10
7	Thet Muu Shwe Sin (MYA)	34.65	35.15	28.50	30.80	27.00	156.10
