= Athletics at the 2013 SEA Games – Men's 200 metres =

The men's 200 metres, at the 2013 SEA Games, was part of the athletics events held in Naypyidaw, Myanmar. The track and field events took place at the Wunna Theikdi Stadium on December 18.

== Schedule ==
All times are Myanmar Standard Time (UTC+06:30)

| Date | Time | Event |
|---|---|---|
| Wednesday, 18 December 2013 | 09:00 | Heats |
| Wednesday, 18 December 2013 | 16:35 | Final |

== Records ==
Prior to this competition, the existing world, Asian, and Southeast Asian Games records were as follows.

| World Record | Usain Bolt (JAM) | 19.19 | Berlin, Germany | 20 August 2009 |
| Asian Record | Shingo Suetsugu (JPN) | 20.03 | Yokohama, Japan | 7 June 2003 |
| Games Record | Reanchai Seeharwong (THA) | 20.69 | Bandar Seri Begawan, Brunei Darussalam | 10 August 1999 |

== Results ==
Legend

- DSQ — Disqualified
- DNF — Do Not Finish

=== Round 1 ===
==== Heat 1 ====
- Wind: -0.6 m/s

| Rank | Lane | Athlete | Time | Notes |
|---|---|---|---|---|
| 1 | 3 | Le Trong Hinh (VIE) | 21.73 | |
| 2 | 4 | Suppachai Chimdee (THA) | 21.80 | |
| 3 | 6 | Rozikin Muhammad Rozikin (INA) | 21.96 | |
| 4 | 2 | Mohd Shahmimi Azmi (MAS) | 22.00 | |
| 5 | 5 | Seng Song Poh (SIN) | 22.59 | |
| 6 | 7 | Thet Zaw Win (MYA) | 22.69 | |

==== Heat 2 ====
- Wind: +0.1 m/s

| Rank | Lane | Athlete | Time | Notes |
|---|---|---|---|---|
| 1 | 5 | Jirapong Meenapra (THA) | 21.67 | |
| 2 | 7 | Harith Ammar Mohd Sobri (MAS) | 21.75 | |
| 3 | 4 | Nguyen Van Huynh (VIE) | 21.88 | |
| 4 | 2 | Fadlin Fadlin (INA) | 22.08 | |
| 5 | 6 | Muhammad Elfi Mustapa (SIN) | 22.12 | |
| 6 | 3 | Kyaw Zin Aung (MYA) | 23.00 | |

=== Final ===
- Wind: -0.1 m/s

| Rank | Lane | Athlete | Time | Notes |
|---|---|---|---|---|
| 1st place, gold medalist(s) | 6 | Jirapong Meenapra (THA) | 21.29 | |
| 2nd place, silver medalist(s) | 3 | Harith Ammar Mohd Sobri (MAS) | 21.46 | |
| 3rd place, bronze medalist(s) | 4 | Le Trong Hinh (VIE) | 21.47 | |
| 4 | 5 | Suppachai Chimdee (THA) | 21.48 | |
| 5 | 7 | Nguyen Van Huynh (VIE) | 21.49 | |
| 6 | 8 | Rozikin Muhammad Rozikin (INA) | 21.60 | |
| 7 | 1 | Mohd Shahmimi Azmi (MAS) | 21.72 | |
| 8 | 2 | Fadlin Fadlin (INA) | 22.10 | |
