= Swimming at the 2013 SEA Games – Women's 100 metre butterfly =

The Women's 100 metre butterfly event at the 2013 SEA Games took place on 14 December 2013 at Wunna Theikdi Aquatics Centre.

There were 13 competitors from 8 countries who took part in this event. Two heats were held. The heat in which a swimmer competed did not formally matter for advancement, as the swimmers with the top eight times from both field qualified for the finals.

== Schedule ==
All times are Myanmar Standard Time (UTC+06:30)

| Date | Time | Event |
|---|---|---|
| Thursday, 14 December 2013 | 09:17 | Heats |
| Thursday, 14 December 2013 | 18:27 | Final |

== Records ==
Prior to this competition, the existing world, Asian, and Southeast Asian Games records were as follows.

| World Record | Dana Vollmer (USA) | 55.98 | London, United Kingdom | 29 July 2012 |
| Asian Record | Liu Zige (CHN) | 56.07 | Jinan, China | 11 September 2009 |
| Games Record | Tao Li (SIN) | 58.84 | Palembang, Indonesia | 12 November 2011 |

== Results ==
=== Heats ===
| Rank | Heat | Lane | Athlete | Time | Notes |
|---|---|---|---|---|---|
| 1 | 1 | 3 | Patarawadee Kittiya (THA) | 1:02.36 | |
| 2 | 1 | 4 | Quah Ting Wen (SIN) | 1:02.41 | Q |
| 3 | 2 | 4 | Tao Li (SIN) | 1:02.90 | Q |
| 4 | 2 | 5 | Nguyen Thi Kim Tuyen (VIE) | 1:03.38 | Q |
| 5 | 1 | 5 | Jasmine Al-Khaldi (PHI) | 1:03.40 | Q |
| 6 | 2 | 3 | Supasuta Sounthornchote (THA) | 1:03.47 | Q |
| 7 | 2 | 6 | Yap Siew Hui (MAS) | 1:03.48 | Q |
| 8 | 1 | 2 | Monalisa Arieswaty Lorenza (INA) | 1:03.68 | Q |
| 9 | 2 | 2 | Ressa Kania Dewi (INA) | 1:04.31 | Q |
| 10 | 1 | 6 | Le Thi My Thao (VIE) | 1:05.76 | |
| 11 | 2 | 7 | Su Moe Theint San (MYA) | 1:07.13 | |
| 12 | 1 | 7 | Shun Lei Maw Oo (MYA) | 1:13.87 | |
| 13 | 2 | 1 | Veomany Siriphone (LAO) | 1:19.51 | |

=== Final ===
| Rank | Lane | Athlete | Time | Notes |
|---|---|---|---|---|
| 1st place, gold medalist(s) | 5 | Tao Li (SIN) | 59.87 | |
| 2nd place, silver medalist(s) | 4 | Quah Ting Wen (SIN) | 1:00.34 | |
| 3rd place, bronze medalist(s) | 6 | Jasmine Al-Khaldi (PHI) | 1:01.76 | |
| 4 | 7 | Yap Siew Hui (MAS) | 1:01.97 | |
| 5 | 2 | Supasuta Sounthornchote (THA) | 1:02.07 | |
| 6 | 3 | Nguyen Thi Kim Tuyen (VIE) | 1:03.15 | |
| 7 | 1 | Monalisa Arieswaty Lorenza (INA) | 1:03.84 | |
| 7 | 8 | Ressa Kania Dewi (INA) | 1:03.84 | |
