= Diving at the 2013 SEA Games – Men's synchronized 10 metre platform =

The men's 10 synchronized metre platform diving competition at the 2013 SEA Games took place in Naypyidaw, Myanmar, on 21 December at the Wunna Theikdi Aquatics Centre.

== Schedule ==
All times are Myanmar Standard Time (UTC+06:30)

Date	Time	Event
Saturday, 21 December 2013	15:00	Final

== Results ==
Legend

- DNF — Did not finish
- DNS — Did not start

Rank	Team	Dives						Total
Rank	Team	1	2	3	4	5	6	Total
1st place, gold medalist(s)	Malaysia (MAS); Ooi Tze Liang; Muhammad Nazreen Abdullah	52.80	47.40	62.10	78.72	73.26	72.00	386.28
2nd place, silver medalist(s)	Indonesia (INA); Andriyan; Adityo Restu Putra	40.20	46.80	63.90	55.68	58.56	62.37	327.51
3rd place, bronze medalist(s)	Singapore (SIN); Lee Timothy Han Kuan; Lee Mark Han Ming	45.00	48.60	48.00	59.64	59.40	39.60	300.24
4	Thailand (THA); Suchart Pichi; Theerapat Siri Boon	36.60	43.20	67.20	57.60	45.60	44.10	294.30
5	Myanmar (MYA); Naung Kyar; Zwe Thet Oo	48.00	47.40	41.61	51.06	49.56	38.40	276.03
