= Swimming at the 2013 SEA Games – Men's 100 metre breaststroke =

The Men's 100 metre breaststroke event at the 2013 SEA Games took place on 13 December 2013 at Wunna Theikdi Aquatics Centre.

There were 14 competitors from 8 countries who took part in this event. Two heats were held. The heat in which a swimmer competed did not formally matter for advancement, as the swimmers with the top eight times from both field qualified for the finals.

== Schedule ==
All times are Myanmar Standard Time (UTC+06:30)

Date	Time	Event
Thursday, 13 December 2013	09:08	Heats
Thursday, 13 December 2013	18:24	Final

== Records ==
Prior to this competition, the existing world, Asian, and Southeast Asian Games records were as follows.

World Record	Cameron van der Burgh (RSA)	58.46	London, United Kingdom	29 July 2012
Asian Record	Kosuke Kitajima (JPN)	58.90	Tokyo, Japan	3 April 2012
Games Record	Nguyen Huu Viet (VIE)	1:01.60	Vientiane, Laos	11 December 2009

== Results ==
=== Heats ===
Rank	Heat	Lane	Athlete	Time	Notes
1	2	5	Radomyos Matjiur (THA)	1:03.69	Q
2	2	4	Joshua Hall (PHI)	1:03.83	Q
3	1	4	Indra Gunawan (INA)	1:04.06	Q
4	1	3	Nuttapong Ketin (THA)	1:04.44	Q
5	1	2	Christopher Ee Hong Cheong (SIN)	1:04.67	Q
6	2	2	Dennis Josua Tiwa (INA)	1:04.85	Q
7	2	6	Yap See Tuan (MAS)	1:05.19	Q
8	2	7	Huynh The Vi (VIE)	1:05.36	Q
9	1	5	Shaun Yap (MAS)	1:05.38	
10	1	6	Nguyen Huu Viet (VIE)	1:05.47	
11	1	7	Thonponloeu Hem (CAM)	1:11.32	
12	1	2	Yan Naung Soe (MYA)	1:11.90	
13	2	1	Sein Win Ryan (MYA)	1:13.63	
-	2	3	Banjo Borja (PHI)	DNS	

=== Final ===
Rank	Lane	Athlete	Time	Notes
1st place, gold medalist(s)	4	Radomyos Matjiur (THA)	1:03.06	
-	3	Indra Gunawan (INA)	1:03.18	DSQ
2nd place, silver medalist(s)	5	Joshua Hall (PHI)	1:03.32	
3rd place, bronze medalist(s)	6	Nuttapong Ketin (THA)	1:03.61	
5	1	Yap See Tuan (MAS)	1:05.16	
6	7	Dennis Josua Tiwa (INA)	1:05.30	
7	2	Christopher Ee Hong Cheong (SIN)	1:05.46	
8	8	Huynh The Vi (VIE)	1:07.01	

=== Controversy ===
The bronze medallist, Joshua Hall from the Philippines, is expected to have his bronze medal upgraded to a silver medal, after the International Swimming Federation (FINA) slapped a two-year ban on Indonesian swimmer Indra Gunawan, who won the silver medal in the event. Gunawan’s urine sample tested positive for Methylhexaneamine, a performance-enhancing substance, during random testing at the 4th Asian Indoor and Martial Arts Games held in July 2013.
