= Equestrian at the 2013 SEA Games – Individual dressage =

Individual dressage equestrian at the 2013 Southeast Asian Games in Wunna Theikdi Equestrian Field, Naypyidaw, Myanmar from December 13 to 14, 2013.

== Schedule ==
All times are Myanmar Standard Time (UTC+06:30)

Date	Time	Event
Friday, 13 December 2013	09:00	Qualification
Saturday, 14 December 2013	09:00	Final

== Results ==
Legend

- RT — Retired
- WD — Withdrawn
- EL — Eliminated
- NS — Not Started

Rider	Nation	Horse	Qualification Scores	Rank	Final Scores	Rank
Praveen Nair Mathavan	Malaysia (MAS)	Sein Win Mal	68.206	2 Q	67.405	1st place, gold medalist(s)
Valentino Lumentah	Indonesia (INA)	Ngwe Lar May	67.517	3 Q	66.432	2nd place, silver medalist(s)
Ferry Wahyu Hadiyanto	Indonesia (INA)	Perfecting Ruby	71.757	1 Q	64.108	3rd place, bronze medalist(s)
Predrag Marjanovic	Singapore (SIN)	Rolex	65.413	7 Q	60.810	4
Shooredran Nageswaran	Malaysia (MAS)	Tommy Gun	62.896	11 Q	59.945	5
Than Naing Aung	Myanmar (MYA)	Sir Jerico	65.724	6 Q	59.378	6
Dhe-Win Manathanya	Thailand (THA)	CP Orego	59.586	13 Q	58.567	7
Pei Jia Caroline Rosanna Chew	Singapore (SIN)	It's Mine	61.862	12 Q	58.540	8
Aung Thu Tun	Myanmar (MYA)	CP Safari	66.654	5 Q	57.351	9
H.R.H. Princess Sirivannavarinariratana	Thailand (THA)	Htate Kwet	63.069	10 Q	53.810	10
Puthminea Sor	Cambodia (CAM)	Myanmar A Hla	54.793	20 Q	52.081	11
Narith Sim	Cambodia (CAM)	Gunderman	55.172	19 Q	49.135	12
Erwin M. Yoga	Indonesia (INA)	Charrua	66.655	4		
Saw Maung	Myanmar (MYA)	Bagan Minthamee	64.931	8		
Natalie Pinruo Tan	Singapore (SIN)	Damon Hill	63.276	9		
Catherine Yung Wen Oh	Singapore (SIN)	Oscar Royal	57.867	14		
Nitipat Ngao Osa	Thailand (THA)	Kinnordy Gyuana	57.551	15		
Tun Aung Phyo	Myanmar (MYA)	Front N Center	57.758	16		
Alvaro Menayang	Indonesia (INA)	Billy	56.517	17		
Muhammad Shaiful Azwan	Malaysia (MAS)	King	56.241	18		
Edric Lee Chin Hon	Malaysia (MAS)	Just A Snip	50.344	21		
Sopheaktra Lon	Cambodia (CAM)	Fast Track	49.931	22		
Sopharith Hoy	Cambodia (CAM)	Kick And Kenny	44.965	23		
Pakjira Thongpakdi	Thailand (THA)	Bundaruka Camego	EL	–		
