= Weightlifting at the 2013 SEA Games =

- Venue: Thein Phyu Stadium
- Location: Yangon, Myanmar
- Dates: 13–16 December 2013

Weightlifting at the 2013 SEA Games took place in Thein Phyu Stadium, Yangon, Myanmar between 13–16 December. There were five weight categories for the women and six for the men.

== Events ==
11 sets of medals were awarded in the following events:

- 56 kg Men
- 62 kg Men
- 69 kg Men
- 77 kg Men
- 85 kg Men
- 94 kg Men

- 48 kg Women
- 53 kg Women
- 58 kg Women
- 63 kg Women
- 69 kg Women

== Medalists ==
=== Men ===
Event	Gold		Silver		Bronze	
56 kg	Thạch Kim Tuấn; Vietnam	285	Jadi Setiadi; Indonesia	261	Pyae Phyo; Myanmar	246
62 kg	Eko Yuli Irawan; Indonesia	304	Lê Quang Trung; Vietnam	291	Myint Kyi; Myanmar	289
69 kg	Deni; Indonesia	324	Kyaw Moe Win; Myanmar	314	Tairat Bunsuk; Thailand	312
77 kg	Pornchai Lobsi; Thailand	336	Nguyễn Hồng Ngọc; Vietnam	319	Edi Kurniawan; Indonesia	316
85 kg	Pitaya Tibnoke; Thailand	341	Hoàng Tấn Tài; Vietnam	332	Suchat Somboon; Thailand	328
94 kg	Sarat Sumpradit; Thailand	352	Trần Văn Hoá; Vietnam	345	Mohd Faiz Musa; Malaysia	308

=== Women ===
Event	Gold		Silver		Bronze	
48 kg	Sri Wahyuni Agustiani; Indonesia	188	Panida Khamsri; Thailand	177	Đỗ Thị Thu Hoài; Vietnam	176
53 kg	Aye Thanda Lwin; Myanmar	202	Nguyễn Thị Thúy; Vietnam	191	Citra Febrianti; Indonesia	191
58 kg	Sukanya Srisurat; Thailand	225	Hidilyn Diaz; Philippines	224	Lâm Thị Bích; Vietnam	201
63 kg	Pimsiri Sirikaew; Thailand	231	Ni Luh Sinta Darmariani; Indonesia	209	Nguyễn Thị Tuyết Mai; Vietnam	201
69 kg	Boonatee Klakasikit; Thailand	225	Lae Lae Win; Myanmar	209	Nor Khasida Abdul Halim; Malaysia	188

== Medal table ==
* Host nation (Myanmar)

Rank	Nation	Gold	Silver	Bronze	Total
1	Thailand	6	1	2	9
2	Indonesia	3	2	2	7
3	Vietnam	1	5	3	9
4	Myanmar*	1	2	2	5
5	Philippines	0	1	0	1
6	Malaysia	0	0	2	2
Totals (6 entries)		11	11	11	33
