= Athletics at the 2013 SEA Games – Men's high jump =

The men's high jump at the 2013 SEA Games, the athletics was held in Naypyidaw, Myanmar. The track and field events took place at the Wunna Theikdi Stadiumon December 18.

== Schedule ==
All times are Myanmar Standard Time (UTC+06:30)

Date	Time	Event
Wednesday, 18 December 2013	14:35	Final

== Records ==
Prior to this competition, the existing world, Asian, and Southeast Asian Games records were as follows.

World Record	Javier Sotomayor (CUB)	2.45	Salamanca, Spain	27 July 1993
Asian Record	Mutaz Essa Barshim (QAT)	2.40	Eugene, Oregon, United States	1 June 2013
Games Record	Loo Kum Zee (MAS)	2.24	Chiang Mai, Thailand	14 December 1995

== Results ==
Legend

- NM — No Mark

Rank	Athlete	Result	Notes
1st place, gold medalist(s)	Nauraj Singh Randhawa (MAS)	2.17	
2nd place, silver medalist(s)	Dao Van Thuy (VIE)	2.13	
3rd place, bronze medalist(s)	Pramote Pumurai (THA)	2.13	
4	Tyler Ruiz (PHI)	2.09	
5	Subramaniam Navinraj (MAS)	2.09	
6	Abdul Haqim Haji Yahya (BRU)	2.00	
7	Htin Lin (MYA)	1.85	
