= Athletics at the 2013 SEA Games – Men's shot put =

The men's shot put at the 2013 SEA Games, the athletics was held in Naypyidaw, Myanmar. The track and field events is taking place at the Wunna Theikdi Stadiumon December 19.

== Schedule ==
All times are Myanmar Standard Time (UTC+06:30)

Date	Time	Event
Thursday, 19 December 2013	15:40	Final

== Records ==
Prior to this competition, the existing world, Asian, and Southeast Asian Games records were as follows.

World Record	Randy Barnes (USA)	23.12	Los Angeles, United States	20 May 1990
Asian Record	Sultan Al-Hebshi (KSA)	21.13	Doha, Qatar	8 May 2009
Games Record	Chatchawal Polyiam (THA)	17.74	Palembang, Indonesia	13 November 2011

== Results ==
Legend

- X — Failure

Rank	Athlete	Attempts						Result	Notes
Rank	Athlete	1	2	3	4	5	6	Result	Notes
1st place, gold medalist(s)	Thawat Khachin (THA)	?	?	?	?	?	?	17.54	
2nd place, silver medalist(s)	Adi Aliffuddin Hussin (MAS)	?	?	?	?	?	?	17.10	
3rd place, bronze medalist(s)	Mr Chatchawal Polyiam (THA)	?	?	?	?	?	?	16.85	
4	Eliezer Sunang (PHI)	?	?	?	?	?	?	16.72	NR
5	De Ye Wu (MYA)	?	?	?	?	?	?	13.91	
6	Thein Zaw Myo (MYA)	?	?	?	?	?	?	13.02	
