= Athletics at the 2013 SEA Games – Women's 100 metres hurdles =

The women's 100 metres hurdles, at the 2013 SEA Games, was part of the athletics program held in Naypyidaw, Myanmar. The track and field event took place at the Wunna Theikdi Stadium on December 19.

== Schedule ==
All times are Myanmar Standard Time (UTC+06:30)

Date	Time	Event
Thursday, 19 December 2013	15:15	Final

== Records ==
Prior to this competition, the existing world, Asian, and Southeast Asian Games records were as follows.

World Record	Yordanka Donkova (BUL)	12.21	Stara Zagora, Bulgaria	20 August 1988
Asian Record	Olga Shishigina (KAZ)	12.44	Lucerne, Switzerland	27 June 1995
Games Record	Trecia Roberts (THA)	12.85	Bandar Seri Begawan, Brunei Darussalam	9 August 1999

== Results ==
Legend

- Wind:+0.3 m/s

Rank	Lane	Athlete	Time	Notes
1st place, gold medalist(s)	4	Dedeh Erawati (INA)	13.53	
2nd place, silver medalist(s)	7	Wallapa Punsoongneun (THA)	13.71	
3rd place, bronze medalist(s)	6	Raja Nursheena Raja Azhar (MAS)	13.84	
4	5	Panida Rattanachan (THA)	13.90	
5	3	Manivanh Chanthavong (LAO)	14.53	NR
6	2	Tin Zar Moe (MYA)	14.84	
