= Equestrian at the 2013 SEA Games – Individual endurance =

Individual endurance equestrian at the 2013 Southeast Asian Games was held in Wunna Theikdi Equestrian Field, Naypyidaw, Myanmar on December 10, 2013.

== Schedule ==
All times are Myanmar Standard Time (UTC+06:30)

Date	Time	Event
Tuesday, 10 December 2013	20:00	Final

== Results ==
Legend

- EL — Eliminated
- RT — Retired
- WD — Withdrawn

Rank	Athlete	Horse	Time
1st place, gold medalist(s)	Mohd Sulaiman Muda (MAS)	Bagan Thitsar	06:26:04
2nd place, silver medalist(s)	Yusnar Yusuf (INA)	Sein Gandawin	06:26:05
3rd place, bronze medalist(s)	R.Otto Satyawan Rachmad (INA)	Shwe Sal	06:59:00
4	Abdul Halim Alihan (MAS)	Kaung Su Paing	07:28:46
5	Asri Abdul Aziz (MAS)	Sein Yadi	07:28:49
6	Kyaw Zin (MYA)	Mingalar May	08:45:43
7	Thet Wai Lin (MYA)	Yamin Theingi	08:45:52
8	Naing Win (MYA)	Moe Natthuzar	08:46:00
—	Palaporn Powjee (THA)	Bagan A-Hla	EL
—	Pattarapol Pakawutprasert (THA)	Htike Thu San	EL
—	Mohd Bulkhari Rozali (MAS)	Sein Hnin Si	EL
—	R Ohimat (INA)	O Bamar	EL
—	Thein Win (MYA)	Sein San Sint	EL
—	Jettakorn Meechokchai (THA)	Pale Thu	EL
—	Sophon Jaengkrajang (THA)	Ayerwaddy	EL
—	Sopyan Gelar Mulyana (INA)	Kan Pwint	EL
