= Diving at the 2013 SEA Games – Men's 10 metre platform =

The men's 10 metre platform diving competition at the 2013 SEA Games took place in Naypyidaw, Myanmar on 18 December at the Wunna Theikdi Aquatics Centre.

== Schedule ==
All times are Myanmar Standard Time (UTC+06:30)

Date	Time	Event
Wednesday, 18 December 2013	17:00	Final

== Results ==
Legend

- DNF — Did not finish
- DNS — Did not start

Rank	Athlete	Dives						Total
Rank	Athlete	1	2	3	4	5	6	Total
1st place, gold medalist(s)	Muhammad Nazreen Abdullah (MAS)	72.00	65.60	56.70	70.95	67.20	65.60	398.05
2nd place, silver medalist(s)	Ooi Tze Liang (MAS)	75.20	75.20	49.50	46.20	75.90	75.20	397.20
3rd place, bronze medalist(s)	Adityo Restu Putra (INA)	45.60	55.50	62.40	56.10	60.80	57.60	338.00
4	Htet Nanda Linn (MYA)	39.00	48.05	38.00	36.75	37.80	29.75	229.35
5	Zaw Myo Htet (MYA)	42.55	51.80	31.35	34.20	33.00	29.70	222.60
