= Athletics at the 2013 SEA Games – Men's 1500 metres =

The men's 1500 metres at the 2013 SEA Games was held in Naypyidaw, Myanmar. The track and field events took place at the Wunna Theikdi Stadiumon December 19 2013.

== Schedule ==
All times are Myanmar Standard Time (UTC+06:30)

Date	Time	Event
Thursday, 19 December 2013	15:30	Final

== Records ==
Prior to this competition, the existing world, Asian, and Southeast Asian Games records were as follows.

World Record	Hicham El-Guerrouj (MAR)	3:26.00	Rome, Italy	14 July 1998
Asian Record	Rashid Ramzi (BRN)	3:29.14	Rome, Italy	14 July 2006
Games Record	Nguyen Dinh Cuong (VIE)	3:45.31	Nakhon Ratchasima, Thailand	11 December 2007

== Results ==
Rank	Athlete	Time	Notes
1st place, gold medalist(s)	Mohd Jironi Riduan (MAS)	3:58.02	
1st place, gold medalist(s)	Duong Van Thai (VIE)	3:58.02	
3rd place, bronze medalist(s)	Ridwan Ridwan (INA)	3:58.37	
4	Mervin Guarte (PHI)	3:58.43	
5	Yothin Yaprajan (THA)	4:00.94	
6	Samorn Kieng (CAM)	4:03.73	
7	Christopher Jr Ulboc (PHI)	4:05.76	
8	Kesavan Maniam (MAS)	4:05.90	
9	Maung Chat (MYA)	4:06.77	
10	Hackdy Phengphansenchith (LAO)	4:10.00	
—	Chan Myae Aung (MYA)	DNS	
