= Putu Wiradamungga =

Indonesian Olympic judoka

Personal information
- Full name: Putu Wiradamungga Adesta
- Born: 2 December 1991 (age 34) Bangli, Bali, Indonesia
- Occupation: Judoka

Sport
- Country: Indonesia
- Sport: Judo
- Weight class: ‍–‍81 kg

Achievements and titles
- Olympic Games: R32 (2012)
Medal record
Men's judo
Representing Indonesia
SEA Games
| Bronze medal – third place | 2013 Naypyidaw | 81 kg |

Profile at external databases
- IJF: 6615
- JudoInside.com: 72447

Putu Wiradamungga Adesta (born 2 December 1991, in Bangli) is an Indonesian judoka. He competed in the men's 81 kg event at the 2012 Summer Olympics and was eliminated in the second round by László Csoknyai.
