= Equestrian at the 2013 SEA Games =

Equestrian at the 2013 Southeast Asian Games in Naypyidaw, Myanmar was held between December 12–18. Six events took place, all being staged at Wunna Theikdi Equestrian Field.

== Medal summary ==
=== Medal table ===
* Host nation (Myanmar)

| Rank | Nation | Gold | Silver | Bronze | Total |
|---|---|---|---|---|---|
| 1 | Malaysia (MAS) | 3 | 0 | 0 | 3 |
| 2 | Indonesia (INA) | 2 | 2 | 4 | 8 |
| 3 | Singapore (SIN) | 1 | 0 | 1 | 2 |
| 4 | Myanmar (MYA)* | 0 | 3 | 0 | 3 |
| 5 | Thailand (THA) | 0 | 1 | 1 | 2 |
| Totals (5 entries) | | 6 | 6 | 6 | 18 |

=== Medalists ===
| Event | Gold | Silver | Bronze |
|---|---|---|---|
| Individual dressage | Praveen Nair Mathavan on Sein Win Mal; Malaysia | Valentino Lumentah on Ngwe Lar May; Indonesia | Ferry Wahyu Hadiyanto on Perfecting Ruby; Indonesia |
| Team dressage | Indonesia; Ferry Wahyu Hadiyanto on Perfecting Ruby; Valentino Lumentah on Ngwe Lar May; Erwin Yoga on Charrua; Alvaro Menayang on Billy | Myanmar; Aung Thu Tuh on CP Safari; Than Naing Aung on Sir Jerico; Saw Maung on Bagan Minthamee; Tun Aung Phyo on Front N Center | Singapore; Predrag Marjanovic on Rolex; Natalie Pinruo Tan on Ma Lay Phyu; Pei Jia Caroline Rosanna Chew on It's Mine; Catherine Yung Wen Oh on Oscar Royal |
| Individual endurance | Mohd Sulaiman Muda on Bagan Thitsar; Malaysia | Yusnar Yusuf on Sein Gandawin; Indonesia | Otto Satyawan Rachmad on Shwe Sal; Indonesia |
| Team endurance | Malaysia; Mohd Bulkhari Rozali on Sein Hnin Si; Mohd Sulaiman Muda on Bagan Thitsar; Abdul Halim Alihan on Kaung Su Paing; Asri Abdul Aziz on Sein Yadi | Myanmar; Thein Win on Sein San Sint; Kyaw Zin on Mingalar May; Thet Wai Lin on Yamin Theingi; Naing Win on Moe Natthuzar | Indonesia; R. Ohimat on O Bamar; Sopyan Gelar Mulyana on Kan Pwint; Yusnar Yusuf on Sein Gandawin; Otto Satyawan Rachmad on Shwe Sal |
| Individual jumping | Janine Khoo on CP Safari; Singapore | Jaruporn Limpichati on Just a Snip; Thailand | Jendry Palandeng on Gunderman; Indonesia |
| Team jumping | Indonesia; Jendry Palandeng on Gunderman; Andry Prasetyono on Fast Track; Pingkan Motira on Billy; Asep Lesmana on Sein Than Sint | Myanmar; Zaw Wai on You Bet I Bite; Saw Maung on Oscar Royal; Tun Aung Phyo on Breeze; Aung Thu Tun on Charrua | Thailand; Jaruporn Limpichati on Just a Snip; Siengsaw Letratanachai on Rolex; Supanut Wannakool on Kinnordy Gyuana; Supap Khaw-Ngam on King |

| Preceded by 2011 | Equestrian at the Southeast Asian Games; 2013 Southeast Asian Games | Succeeded by 2015 |
