= Athletics at the 2013 SEA Games – Women's hammer throw =

The women's hammer throw at the 2013 SEA Games, the athletics was held in Naypyidaw, Myanmar. The track and field events took place at the Wunna Theikdi Stadiumon December 16.

== Schedule ==
All times are Myanmar Standard Time (UTC+06:30)

Date	Time	Event
Monday, 16 December 2013	10:00	Final

== Records ==
Prior to this competition, the existing world, Asian, and Southeast Asian Games records were as follows.

World Record	Betty Heidler (GER)	79.42m	Halle, Germany	21 May 2011
Asian Record	Zhang Wenxiu (CHN)	76.99m	Ostrava, Czech Republic	24 May 2012
Games Record	Tan Song Hwa (MAS)	56.41m	Vientiane, Laos	15 December 2009

== Results ==
Legend

- X — Failure
- NM — No Mark

Rank	Athlete	Attempts						Result	Notes
Rank	Athlete	1	2	3	4	5	6	Result	Notes
1st place, gold medalist(s)	Panwat Gimsrang (THA)	?	?	?	?	?	?	54.96	NR
2nd place, silver medalist(s)	Renee Kelly Lee Casier (MAS)	?	?	?	?	?	?	53.12	
3rd place, bronze medalist(s)	Mingkamon Koomphon (THA)	?	?	?	?	?	?	51.82	
4	Loralie Sermona (PHI)	?	?	?	?	?	?	50.26	
5	M Soe Zar (MYA)	?	?	?	?	?	?	41.75	NR
—	Nurfazira Jalaludin (MAS)	?	?	?	?	?	?	NM	
