= Daniel Bego =

Malaysian swimmer

Personal information
- Full name: Daniel William Henry Wong Bego
- Nickname: Danny
- National team: Malaysia
- Born: 18 September 1989 (age 36) Kuching, Sarawak, Malaysia
- Height: 1.72 m (5 ft 7 1/2 in)
- Weight: 64 kg (141 lb)

Sport
- Sport: Swimming
- Strokes: Freestyle, butterfly
- Coach: Gavin Urquhart
Medal record
Men's swimming
Representing Malaysia
Southeast Asian Games
Gold medal – first place	2003 Hanoi	4×200 m freestyle
Gold medal – first place	2005 Manila	200 m freestyle
Gold medal – first place	2005 Manila	100 m butterfly
Gold medal – first place	2007 Bangkok	200 m freestyle
Gold medal – first place	2007 Bangkok	100 m butterfly
Gold medal – first place	2009 Vientiane	100 m freestyle
Gold medal – first place	2009 Vientiane	200 m freestyle
Gold medal – first place	2009 Vientiane	400 m freestyle
Gold medal – first place	2009 Vientiane	100 m butterfly
Gold medal – first place	2009 Vientiane	200 m butterfly
Gold medal – first place	2013 Naypyidaw	400 m freestyle
Silver medal – second place	2003 Hanoi	100 m freestyle
Silver medal – second place	2005 Manila	100 m freestyle
Silver medal – second place	2007 Bangkok	100 m freestyle
Silver medal – second place	2013 Naypyidaw	200 m freestyle
Silver medal – second place	2013 Naypyidaw	4x100 m freestyle
Silver medal – second place	2013 Naypyidaw	4x100 m freestyle
Bronze medal – third place	2003 Hanoi	200 m freestyle
Bronze medal – third place	2007 Bangkok	200 m butterfly
Bronze medal – third place	2007 Bangkok	4×200 m freestyle
Bronze medal – third place	2009 Vientiane	4×200 m freestyle
Islamic Solidarity Games
Gold medal – first place	2005 Mecca	200 m freestyle
Gold medal – first place	2005 Mecca	400 m freestyle
Gold medal – first place	2013 Palembang	200 m freestyle
- Updated on 1 August 2014

Daniel William Henry "Danny" Wong Bego (born 18 September 1989) is a Malaysian swimmer, who specialises in freestyle and butterfly events. He emerged as one of Malaysia's most promising and outstanding swimmers, winning a total of fifteen medals (nine gold, two silver, and four bronze) at the Southeast Asian Games, and breaking six national records. He was the first Malaysian swimmer to compete in three different events at a single Olympic Games.

== Personal life ==
Bego, a native of Kuching, is the youngest of six siblings in the family. His mother Amy Wong, is a registered nurse, who gave up her job to nurture and care for her children; his father Henry Bego, on the other hand, works offshore as a senior diving technician, and is often away from the family. His half-sister Kimberley Yap is a former swimmer and triathlete, who eventually won gold medals for her category at the Southeast Asian Games. He is of Iban-Chinese heritage, and can speak fluent English and Mandarin.

== Swimming career ==
Bego began his swimming career at the very young age, when he and his family moved to Sri Petaling, on the outskirts of Kuala Lumpur. He made his official debut at the 2003 Southeast Asian Games in Hanoi, Vietnam, where he captured a full set of medals in the freestyle events. He was undisputedly the best swimmer of Malaysia during his peak years in the free-style, winning three gold medals at the Olympic qualifying trials in Singapore. Despite his success, Bego failed to secure his place for the 2004 Summer Olympics in Athens, Greece, after finishing outside the qualifying time of 1:55.08 in the 200 m freestyle event, clocking only at 1:56.20.

In 2005, Bego broke a national record of 1:54.10 in the 200 m freestyle, and achieved his personal best of 4:03.10, by winning gold medals at the Islamic Solidarity Games in Saudi Arabia. He attained qualifying places at the Southeast Asian Games in Manila, Philippines, where he won three medals, including two golds for the 200 m freestyle and for the 100 m butterfly. In 2006, Bego competed at the Asian Games in Doha, Qatar, and at the Commonwealth Games, but missed out of the medal podium in the finals. He was able to win two silver medals for the men's butterfly events, with impressive times at the FINA Youth World Swimming Championships in Rio de Janeiro, Brazil. In following year, Bego aimed to qualify for the 2008 Summer Olympics in Beijing at the Malaysian Open Championships and at the Japan International Championships. He swam the 100 m freestyle in a personal best time of 51.32 seconds, and set a national record in the 200 m freestyle. In the 200 m butterfly event, he broke another national record of 2:00.12, set by Anthony Ang at the 2000 Summer Olympics in Sydney, booking him a ticket under the B-standard category for the Beijing games. A few months later, Bego competed in five individual and three relay events at the 2007 Southeast Asian Games in Bangkok, Thailand. Although he managed to repeat the silver medal in the 100 m freestyle, Bego successfully defended his titles and shattered his own personal records in the 200 m freestyle and 100 m butterfly, earning him two more additional spots in the same category for the Olympics. He also added two bronze in the 200 m butterfly, and in the 4×100 m freestyle relay, for a total of five medals. He was named 2007 Malaysian Olympian of the Year for his full recognition and outstanding achievements in the Southeast Asian Games, along with his counterpart teammate Khoo Cai Lin.

=== 2008 Summer Olympics ===
Bego was selected as the lone male swimmer to the national team, made his official debut, and represented Malaysia at the 2008 Summer Olympics in Beijing. He also became the first Malaysian swimmer to compete in three different events at a single Olympics. Bego swam in the third heat of his first event, 200 m freestyle, against six other competitors, including Ryan Pini of Papua New Guinea, who won in this heat. He finished sixth in the race, which was later dominated by American swimmer and all-time Olympian Michael Phelps. Although he failed to advance into the semi-finals, Bego broke his own national record in the heats, with a time of 1:50.92, to better his previous mark of 1:51.05 at an Olympic test event.

The next day, Bego participated in his second event, 200 m butterfly. He swam in the third heat of the event, and came in seventh place and thirty-seventh overall by two tenths of a second (0.20), to Jeremy Knowles of the Bahamas, with a time of 2:01.28, finishing outside of his own national record. After taking three days off from the heats, Bego competed in his third and final event, 100 m butterfly, which was merely dominated by Phelps. He finished the race with a fastest move, but came only in second place by just three tenths of a second (0.30) to Shaune Fraser of the Cayman Islands, clocking at 54.38 seconds. Bego placed fifty-fourth out of sixty-six swimmers in the event, failing to advance into the semi-final rounds. Following his Olympic performance, Bego made an unprecedented effort at the 2009 FINA World Championships in Rome, Italy, where he broke three national records in the butterfly events.

=== 2009 Southeast Asian Games ===
Bego qualified again for five individual and three relay events at the 2009 Southeast Asian Games in Vientiane, Laos. He emerged as one of Malaysia's most promising and outstanding athletes, and set a historic milestone as the first male swimmer to win five gold medals in all of his individual events at a single games. He led the Malaysian National Swim team to an outstanding tally of nine gold medals, making it Malaysia's best ever effort at a regional meet, outside the host nation.

Bego won gold medals for the first time in the men's 100 m and 400 m freestyle, with impressive national records of 50.16 seconds and 3:53.99, respectively. He put up a spectacular performance in the 200 m butterfly event, as he clawed his way back from the fourth position going into the final turn to strike another gold medal, with a time of 2:00.91. He also defended his titles for the third consecutive time in the 100 m butterfly and 200 m freestyle. For his latter event, Bego trailed behind American-trained Filipino Miguel Molina in the last 50 m by more than one body-length, until he surged his path to touch the pool for a gold, and set another national record of 1:49.22, just three seconds ahead of his previous mark set at the 2007 Southeast Asian Games in Bangkok. He also added his bronze medal for the national team in the men's freestyle relay events. Following his five gold-medal feat, Bego was elected the Most Outstanding Athlete of the Games at the OCM – Coca-Cola Olympian of the Year Awards in Kuala Lumpur.

=== 2010–present ===
In 2010, Bego competed for the second time at the Commonwealth Games in Delhi, India, and at the Asian Games in Guangzhou, China, but finished the race outside of the national record and medal podium in each of his respective events, including his seventh-place finish for the men's 100 m butterfly. In 2011, Bego's shoulder injury took him out of swim competitions for the entire year. He had to undergo another shoulder surgery to correct a long-standing bone spur problem. Because of the operation, he missed out on the 2011 FINA World Championships in Shanghai, China, and most importantly, the 2011 Southeast Asian Games in Palembang, Indonesia, shattering his hopes of repeating a five gold-medal haul in swimming.

After his one-year absence from the surgery, Bego finally returned to the international stage in great physical form, by winning the 50 m butterfly event at the Malaysian Open Championships in Bukit Jalil, with a time of 26.38 seconds. He also put up a record-breaking performance for the men's 4×200 m freestyle relay at the 2012 Southeast Asian Championships in Singapore. Bego, however, missed out of an opportunity to compete at the 2012 Summer Olympics in London, as he failed to reach an invitational time of 1:51.59 in the men's 200 m freestyle, clocking only at 1:52.44.
