= Athletics at the 2013 SEA Games – Men's 800 metres =

The men's 5000 metres at the 2013 SEA Games, was part of the athletics events held in Naypyidaw, Myanmar. The track and field events took place at the Wunna Theikdi Stadiumon December 17.

== Schedule ==
All times are Myanmar Standard Time (UTC+06:30)

Date	Time	Event
Tuesday, 17 December 2013	15:35	Final

== Records ==
Prior to this competition, the existing world, Asian, and Southeast Asian Games records were as follows.

World Record	David Rudisha (KEN)	1:40.91	London, Great Britain	9 August 2012
Asian Record	Yusuf Saad Kamel (BRN)	1:42.79	Fontvieille, Monaco	29 July 2008
Games Record	Samson Vellabouy (MAS)	1:48.29	Kuala Lumpur, Malaysia	14 August 1989

== Results ==
Rank	Athlete	Time	Notes
1st place, gold medalist(s)	Mohd Jironi Riduan (MAS)	01:50.98	
2nd place, silver medalist(s)	Mervin Guarte (PHI)	01:51.51	
3rd place, bronze medalist(s)	Duong Van Thai (VIE)	01:51.62	
4	Yothin Yaprajan (THA)	01:51.91	
5	Kesavan Maniam (MAS)	01:52.24	
6	Sitthiporn Sungtong (THA)	01:54.20	
7	Samorn Kieng (CAM)	01:55.79	
8	Kyaw Laun Aung (MYA)	01:57.33	
9	Hackdy Phengphansenchith (LAO)	01:58.79	
—	Kyaw Zin Oo (MYA)	DNF	
