= Athletics at the 2013 SEA Games – Men's 400 metres hurdles =

The men's 400 metres hurdles, at the 2013 SEA Games, was part of the athletics events held in Naypyidaw, Myanmar. The track and field event took place at the Wunna Theikdi Stadiumon December 17.

== Schedule ==
All times are Myanmar Standard Time (UTC+06:30)

Date	Time	Event
Tuesday, 17 December 2013	10:00	Heats
Tuesday, 17 December 2013	15:10	Final

== Records ==
Prior to this competition, the existing world, Asian, and Southeast Asian Games records were as follows.

World Record	Kevin Young (USA)	46.78	Barcelona, Spain	6 August 1992
Asian Record	Hadi Soua'an Al-Somaily (KSA)	47.53	Sydney, Australia	27 September 2000
Games Record	Chanon Keanchan (THA)	49.76	Chiang Mai, Thailand	12 December 1995

== Results ==
Legend

- DSQ — Disqualified
- DNF — Do Not Finish

=== Round 1 ===
==== Heat 1 ====
Rank	Lane	Athlete	Time	Notes
1	7	Eric Shauwn Cray (PHI)	52.81	
2	2	Nguyen Anh Tu (VIE)	53.41	
3	5	Muhammad Firdaus Musa (MAS)	53.95	
4	6	Narongdech Janjai (THA)	54.99	
5	4	Kyaw Myo Min (MYA)	56.39	
6	3	Somboune Chansombat (LAO)	57.95	

==== Heat 2 ====
Rank	Lane	Athlete	Time	Notes
1	2	Andrian Andrian (INA)	52.88	
2	5	Dao Xuan Cuong (VIE)	53.12	
3	4	Junrey Bano (PHI)	53.47	
4	3	Mohamed Baihaqi Razlan (MAS)	53.57	
5	6	Achittapol Phumphuang (THA)	55.52	
6	7	Soe Moe Win (MYA)	56.75	

=== Final ===
Rank	Lane	Athlete	Time	Notes
1st place, gold medalist(s)	3	Eric Shauwn Cray (PHI)	51.29	
2nd place, silver medalist(s)	5	Andrian Andrian (INA)	51.74	
3rd place, bronze medalist(s)	4	Dao Xuan Cuong (VIE)	51.79	
4	1	Mohamed Baihaqi Razlan (MAS)	52.96	
5	2	Narongdech Janjai (THA)	53.29	
6	7	Junrey Bano (PHI)	53.85	
7	6	Nguyen Anh Tu (VIE)	53.99	
—	8	Muhammad Firdaus Musa (MAS)	DNF	
