= Weightlifting at the 2013 SEA Games – Men's 94 kg =

The men's 94 kg event at the 2013 SEA Games took place on 16 December 2013 at Thein Phyu Stadium.

== Schedule ==
All times are Myanmar Standard Time (UTC+06:30)

Date	Time	Event
Saturday, 16 December 2013	12:00	Final

== Results ==
Rank	Athlete	Group	Body weight	Snatch (kg)				Clean & Jerk (kg)				Total
Rank	Athlete	Group	Body weight	1	2	3	Result	1	2	3	Result	Total
1st place, gold medalist(s)	Sarat Sumpradit (THA)	A	92.65	152	156	158	158	180	188	194	194	352
2nd place, silver medalist(s)	Hoa Tran Van (VIE)	A	93.70	145	~~153~~	157	157	180	188	~~194~~	188	345
3rd place, bronze medalist(s)	Mohd Faiz Musa (MAS)	A	93.65	~~135~~	~~135~~	135	137	165	172	173	173	308
4	Saw Aung Naing (MYA)	A	88.80	130	~~135~~	135	135	~~170~~	170	172	172	307

== New records ==
The following records were established during the competition.

Clean & Jerk	194	Sarat Sumpradit (THA)	GR
