= Athletics at the 2013 SEA Games – Men's hammer throw =

The men's hammer throw at the 2013 SEA Games, the athletics was held in Naypyidaw, Myanmar. The track and field events is taking place at the Wunna Theikdi Stadium on 15 December.

== Schedule ==
All times are Myanmar Standard Time (UTC+06:30)

Date	Time	Event
Sunday, 15 December 2013	14:50	Final

== Records ==
Prior to this competition, the existing world, Asian, and Southeast Asian Games records were as follows.

World Record	Yuriy Sedykh (URS)	86.74	Stuttgart, West Germany	30 August 1986
Asian Record	Koji Murofushi (JPN)	84.86	Prague, Czech Republic	29 June 2003
Games Record	Arniel Ferrera (PHI)	61.62	Vientiane, Laos	13 December 2009

== Results ==
Legend

- X — Failure

Rank	Athlete	Attempts						Result	Notes
Rank	Athlete	1	2	3	4	5	6	Result	Notes
1st place, gold medalist(s)	Tantipong Phetchaiya (THA)	?	?	?	?	?	?	62.23	GR, NR
2nd place, silver medalist(s)	Arniel Ferrera (PHI)	?	?	?	?	?	?	61.18	
3rd place, bronze medalist(s)	Wong Siew Cheer Jackie (MAS)	?	?	?	?	?	?	59.75	NR
4	Kittipong Boonmawan (THA)	?	?	?	?	?	?	54.79	
5	Micheal Sung Dak Sia (MAS)	?	?	?	?	?	?	52.72	
6	Aung Myo Min (MYA)	?	?	?	?	?	?	45.65	NR
7	Soe Thu (MYA)	?	?	?	?	?	?	39.99	
