= Athletics at the 2013 SEA Games – Men's triple jump =

The men's triple jump at the 2013 SEA Games, the athletics was held in Naypyidaw, Myanmar. The track and field events is taking place at the Wunna Theikdi Stadiumon December 19.

== Schedule ==
All times are Myanmar Standard Time (UTC+06:30)

Date	Time	Event
Thursday, 19 December 2013	14:00	Final

== Records ==
Prior to this competition, the existing world, Asian, and Southeast Asian Games records were as follows.

World Record	Jonathan Edwards (GBR)	18.29	Gothenburg, Sweden	7 August 1995
Asian Record	Li Yanxi (CHN)	17.59	Jinan, China	26 October 2009
Games Record	Theerayut Philakong (THA)	16.51	Vientiane, Laos	13 December 2009

== Results ==
Legend

- X — Failure
- DNS — Did Not Finish

Rank	Athlete	Attempts						Result	Notes
Rank	Athlete	1	2	3	4	5	6	Result	Notes
1st place, gold medalist(s)	Nguyen Van Hung (VIE)	16.06	15.86	16.24	16.24	15.70	16.67	16.67	GR, NR
2nd place, silver medalist(s)	Muhammad Hakimi Ismail (MAS)	14.81	16.22	x	16.44	x	x	16.44	NR
3rd place, bronze medalist(s)	Theerayut Philakong (THA)	13.68	x	x	16.26	16.19	15.86	16.26	
4	Varunyoo Kongnil (THA)	15.75	15.84	x	x	15.80	15.83	15.84	
5	Benigno Marayag (PHI)	15.28	15.29	15.10	15.44	15.59	15.16	15.59	
6	Nguyen Van Mua (VIE)	x	15.22	x	x	15.22	14.03	15.22	
7	Aung Toe (MYA)	x	x	x	x	x	13.40	13.40	
—	Kyaw Htet Aung (MYA)	—	—	—	—	—	—	DNS	
