= Equestrian at the 2013 SEA Games – Team endurance =

Team endurance equestrian at the 2013 Southeast Asian Games was held in Wunna Theikdi Equestrian Field, Naypyidaw, Myanmar on December 10, 2013.

== Schedule ==
All times are Myanmar Standard Time (UTC+06:30)

Date	Time	Event
Tuesday, 10 December 2013	20:00	Final

== Results ==
Legend

- RT — Retired
- WD — Withdrawn
- EL — Eliminated

Rank	Team	Riders (Time)
1st place, gold medalist(s)	Malaysia (MAS)	3 (21:23:39)
	Mohd Sulaiman Muda on Bagan Thitsar	06:26:04
	Asri Abdul Aziz on Sein Yadi	07:28:49
	Mohd Bulkhari Rozali on Sein Hnin Si	~~EL~~
	Abdul Halim Alihan on Kaung Su Paing	07:28:46
2nd place, silver medalist(s)	Myanmar (MYA)	3 (26:17:35)
	Thein Win on Sein San Sint	~~EL~~
	Naing Win on Moe Natthuzar	08:46:00
	Kyaw Zin on Mingalar May	08:45:43
	Thet Wai Lin on Yamin Theingi	08:45:52
3rd place, bronze medalist(s)	Indonesia (INA)	2 (13:25:05)
	R.Otto Satyawan Rachmad on Shwe Sal	06:59:00
	Sopyan Gelar Mulyana on Kan Pwint	~~EL~~
	Yusnar Yusuf on Sein Gandawin	06:26:05
	R Ohimat on O Bamar	~~EL~~
—	Thailand (THA)	0
	Jettakorn Meechokchai on Pale Thu	~~EL~~
	Pattarapol Pakawutprasert on Htike Thu San	~~EL~~
	Sophon Jaengkrajang on Ayerwaddy	~~EL~~
	Palaporn Powjee on Bagan A-Hla	~~EL~~
