= Khoo Cai Lin =

Malaysian swimmer

Personal information
- Full name: Khoo Cai Lin (Pronounced as "Chai" Lin)
- Nationality: Malaysia
- Born: 25 December 1988 (age 37) Selangor, Malaysia
- Height: 5 ft 5 in (1.65 m)
- Weight: 119 lb (54 kg)

Sport
- Sport: Swimming
- Strokes: freestyle
Medal record
Women's swimming
Representing Malaysia
Southeast Asian Games
Gold medal – first place	2007 Nakhon Ratchasima	400 m freestyle
Gold medal – first place	2007 Nakhon Ratchasima	800 m freestyle
Gold medal – first place	2009 Vientiane	400 m freestyle
Gold medal – first place	2011 Palembang	800 m freestyle
Gold medal – first place	2013 Naypyidaw	800 m freestyle
Silver medal – second place	2007 Nakhon Ratchasima	4x100 m freestyle
Silver medal – second place	2009 Vientiane	800 m freestyle
Silver medal – second place	2009 Vientiane	200 m butterfly
Silver medal – second place	2009 Vientiane	4x100 m medley
Silver medal – second place	2011 Palembang	400 m freestyle
Silver medal – second place	2011 Palembang	4x100 m medley
Silver medal – second place	2015 Singapore	400 m freestyle
Bronze medal – third place	2003 Hanoi	800 m freestyle
Bronze medal – third place	2007 Nakhon Ratchasima	4x200 m freestyle
Bronze medal – third place	2009 Vientiane	4x100 m freestyle
Bronze medal – third place	2009 Vientiane	4x200 m freestyle
Bronze medal – third place	2011 Palembang	4x100 m freestyle
Bronze medal – third place	2013 Naypyidaw	4x100 m medley

Khoo Cai Lin (born 25 December 1988) is a Malaysian swimmer. She swam for Malaysia at the 2008 and 2012 Olympic Games.

== Career ==
At the 2008 Summer Olympics, she competed in the women's 400 and 800 m freestyle. At the 2012 Summer Olympics, she competed in the Women's 800 metre freestyle, finishing in 30th place overall.

She was awarded the Malaysian Olympian of the Year in 2007 by the Olympic Council of Malaysia.
