= Singapore at the 2013 SEA Games =

Singapore at the 2013 Southeast Asian Games
- IOC code: SIN
- NOC: Singapore National Olympic Council
- Website: www.singaporeolympics.com (in English)

in Naypyidaw
- Medals Ranked 6th: Gold 35 Silver 28 Bronze 45 Total 108

Southeast Asian Games appearances (overview)
- 1959; 1961; 1965; 1967; 1969; 1971; 1973; 1975; 1977; 1979; 1981; 1983; 1985; 1987; 1989; 1991; 1993; 1995; 1997; 1999; 2001; 2003; 2005; 2007; 2009; 2011; 2013; 2015; 2017; 2019; 2021; 2023; 2025; 2027; 2029

Singapore participated at the 2013 Southeast Asian Games from 11 to 22 December 2013. The 27th Southeast Asian Games took place in Naypyidaw, the capital of Myanmar, as well as in two other main cities, Yangon and Mandalay. Singapore itself became the host for the next 2015 event from 5–16 June 2015.

== Preparation ==
The sports committees of Singapore has chosen athletes who will represent the nation for the games.

The Singapore SEA Games football squad has been assembled and played two friendly matches in which they drew the Indonesia national under-23 football team 1-1 and beaten the Philippines national under-23 football team with a scoreline of 1-0. Singapores football team will participate the football event of the games, however the Singapore National Olympic Council (SNOC) has earlier stated that the team will have to produce results if they get the nod to participate in the 2013 Southeast Asian Games.

== Medal by sport ==
Medals by sport
Sport	1st place, gold medalist(s)	2nd place, silver medalist(s)	3rd place, bronze medalist(s)	Total
Diving	0	2	2	4
Swimming	12	8	10	30
Water Polo	1	0	0	1
Archery	1	1	0	2
Athletics	2	3	3	8
Badminton	0	0	1	1
Basketball	0	0	1	1
Billiards and Snooker	1	0	4	5
Boxing	0	0	2	2
Canoeing	2	2	2	6
Chinlone	0	0	1	1
Cycling	1	0	0	1
Equestrian	1	0	1	2
Football	0	0	1	1
Field Hockey	0	1	0	1
Judo	1	1	2	4
Pencak Silat	1	0	2	3
Rowing	1	0	0	1
Sailing	5	2	5	12
Sepak Takraw	0	0	1	1
Shooting	1	4	3	8
Table Tennis	4	1	1	6
Taekwondo	0	1	0	1
Traditional Boat Race	0	0	1	1
Wushu	1	2	2	5
Total	35	28	45	108
