= Shooting at the 2013 SEA Games – Women's 50 metre rifle prone team =

The women's 50 metre rifle prone team event at the 2013 SEA Games took place on 12 December 2013 at the North Dagon Shooting Range in Yangon, Myanmar.

There were six teams of three shooters competed, the results of the team competition also determined for individual competition.

Each shooter fired 60 shots with a .22 Long Rifle at 50 metres distance from the prone position. Scores for each shot were in increments of 1, with a maximum score of 10, all scores from three shooters per team combine to determine team scores.

== Schedule ==
All times are Myanmar Standard Time (UTC+06:30)

Date	Time	Event
Thursday, 12 December 2013	09:00	Final

== Results ==
Rank	Nation	Shooter	Score	Inner 10s	Notes
1st place, gold medalist(s)	Thailand	Thanyalak Chotphibunsin (594); Ratchadaporn Plengsaengthong (591); Vitchuda Pichitkanjanakul (590)	1775	98	
2nd place, silver medalist(s)	Myanmar	Thu Thu Kyaw (595); Aye Aye Thin (587); Than Than Saw (585)	1767	90	
3rd place, bronze medalist(s)	Malaysia	Muslifah Zulkifli (583); Nur Suryani Mohd Taibi (582); Haslisa Hamed (574)	1739	77	
4	Vietnam	Nguyen Thi Phuong (583); Nguyen Thi Xuan (580); Le Thi Anh Dao (575)	1738	77	
5	Indonesia	Maharani Ardy (586); Erlinawati Chailid (578); Rachma Saraswati (560)	1724	66	
6	Singapore	Ser Xiang Wei Jasmine (589); Cheng Jian Huan (581); Aqilah Binte Sudhir (DNS)	DNS		
