= Aquatics at the 2013 SEA Games =

Aquatics at the 2013 Southeast Asian Games took place in Wunna Theikdi Swimming Pool, Naypyidaw, Myanmar for Swimming, Diving, Zayyarthiri Swimming Pool for Water Polo between December 6–21.

== Swimming ==
=== Men ===
Event	Gold		Silver		Bronze	
50 m freestyle	Triady Fauzi Sidiq (INA)	23.12	Russell Ong (SIN)	23.14	Gavin Alexander Lewis (THA)	23.41
100 m freestyle	Triady Fauzi Sidiq (INA)	49.99 GR	Hoang Quy Phuoc (VIE)	50.52	Danny Yeo (SIN)	50.83
200 m freestyle	Hoang Quy Phuoc (VIE)	1:50.64	Daniel Bego (MAS)	1:51.10	Quah Zheng Wen (SIN)	1:51.66
400 m freestyle	Daniel Bego (MAS)	3:54.89	Hoang Quy Phuoc (VIE)	3:57.73	Tanakrit Kittaya (THA)	3:59.00
1500 m freestyle	Lam Quang Nhat (VIE)	15:39.44	Kevin Yeap (MAS)	15:45.89	Welson Sim (MAS)	15:57.98
100 m backstroke	I Gede Siman Sudartawa (INA)	55.80	Quah Zheng Wen (SIN)	56.11	Ricky Anggawijaya (INA)	57.27
200 m backstroke	Ricky Anggawijaya (INA)	2:03.44	I Gede Siman Sudartawa (INA)	2:04.10	Zach Ong Wei Shien (SIN)	2:05.38
100 m breaststroke	Radomyos Matjiur (THA)	1:03.06	Indra Gunawan (INA)	1:03.18	Joshua Hall (PHI)	1:03.32
200 m breaststroke	Nuttapong Ketin (THA)	2:13.32	Radomyos Matjiur (THA)	2:17.77	Yap See Tuan (MAS)	2:18.57
100 m butterfly	Joseph Schooling (SIN)	52.67 GR	Triady Fauzi Sidiq (INA)	53.14	Glenn Victor Sutanto (INA)	53.93
200 m butterfly	Joseph Schooling (SIN)	1:59.46	Quah Zheng Wen (SIN)	2:01.65	Matt Louis Navata (PHI)	2:04.20
200 m individual medley	Joseph Schooling (SIN)	2:00.82 GR	Tran Duy Khoi (VIE)	2:03.81	Nuttapong Ketin (THA)	2:05.06
400 m individual medley	Quah Zheng Wen (SIN)	4:23.45	Nuttapong Ketin (THA)	4:23.63	Tran Duy Khoi (VIE)	4:25.34
4×100 m freestyle relay	Singapore (SIN); Clement Lim; Danny Yeo; Darren Lim; Joseph Schooling	3:21.74 GR	Malaysia (MAS); Lim Ching Hwang; Welson Sim; Vernon Lee; Daniel Bego	3:26.98	Thailand (THA); Napat Wesshasartar; Papungkorn Ingkanont; Cholawat Phoduang; Sarit Tiewong	3:27.17
4×200 m freestyle relay	Singapore (SIN); Joseph Schooling; Danny Yeo; Pang Sheng Jun; Quah Zheng Wen	7:26.67 GR	Malaysia (MAS); Lim Ching Hwang; Kevin Yeap; Daniel Bego; Welson Sim	7:27.32	Indonesia (INA); Triady Fauzi Sidiq; Putera Muhammad Randa; Alexis Wijaya Ohmar; Ricky Anggawijaya	7:35.13
4×100 m medley relay	Singapore (SIN); Quah Zheng Wen; Christopher Cheong; Joseph Schooling; Clement Lim	3:43.62	Thailand (THA); Kasipat Chograthin; Radomyos Matjiur; Supakrid Pananuratana; Cholawat Phoduang	3:47.94		

=== Women ===
Event	Gold		Silver		Bronze	
50 m freestyle	Amanda Lim (SIN)	25.69 GR	Natthanan Junkrajang (THA)	25.80	Jenjira Srisa Ard (THA)	25.90
100 m freestyle	Natthanan Junkrajang (THA)	56.23	Quah Ting Wen (SIN)	56.54	Jasmine Al-Khaldi (PHI)	56.63
200 m freestyle	Natthanan Junkrajang (THA)	2:01.03	Quah Ting Wen (SIN)	2:01.74	Lynette Lim (SIN)	2:02.62
400 m freestyle	Benjaporn Sriphanomthorn (THA)	4:14.23	Nguyen Thi Anh Vien (VIE)	4:16.06	Lynette Lim (SIN)	4:21.24
800 m freestyle	Khoo Cai Lin (MAS)	8:49.51	Benjaporn Sriphanomthorn (THA)	8:49.61	Nguyen Thi Anh Vien (VIE)	8:52.77
100 m backstroke	Tao Li (SIN)	1:02.47	Nguyen Thi Anh Vien (VIE)	1:02.76	Natthanan Junkrajang (THA)	1:04.03
200 m backstroke	Nguyen Thi Anh Vien (VIE)	2:14.80 GR	Yessy Venesia Yosaputra (INA)	2:20.35	Meagan Lim (SIN)	2:21.19
100 m breaststroke	Christina Loh (MAS)	1:10.55	Chavunnooch Salubluek (THA)	1:11.35	Phiangkhwan Pawapotako (THA)	1:12.68
200 m breaststroke	Christina Loh (MAS)	2:32.56	Chavunnooch Salubluek (THA)	2:34.21	Samantha Yeo (SIN)	2:34.27
100 m butterfly	Tao Li (SIN)	59.87	Quah Ting Wen (SIN)	1:00.34	Jasmine Al-Khaldi (PHI)	1:01.76
200 m butterfly	Patarawadee Kittiya (THA)	2:13.83	Quah Ting Wen (SIN)	2:14.42	Tao Li (SIN)	2:14.51
200 m individual medley	Nguyen Thi Anh Vien (VIE)	2:16.20	Phiangkhwan Pawapotako (THA)	2:17.59	Meagan Lim (SIN)	2:20.38
400 m individual medley	Nguyen Thi Anh Vien (VIE)	4:46.16 GR	Ressa Kania Dewi (INA)	4:59.49	Meagan Lim (SIN)	5:01.74
4×100 m freestyle relay	Thailand (THA); Jenjira Srisaard; Patarawadee Kittaya; Benjaporn Sriphanomthorn; Natthanan Junkrajang	3:47.66	Singapore (SIN); Quah Ting Wen; Amanda Lim; Mylene Ong; Lynette Lim	3:49.00	Indonesia (INA); Ressa Kania Dewi; Kathriana Mella Gustianjani; Raina Saumi Grahana Ramdhani; Patricia Yosita Hapsari	3:55.28
4×200 m freestyle relay	Singapore (SIN); Quah Ting Wen; Lynette Lim; Amanda Lim; Tao Li	8:13.99	Indonesia (INA); Raina Saumi Grahana Ramdhani; Kathriana Mella Gustianjani; Patricia Yosita Hapsari; Ressa Kania Dewi	8:43.80	Myanmar (MYA); Khant Su San Khant; Moe Theint San Su; K Zin Win; Ei Thet Ei	9:23.54
4×100 m medley relay	Singapore (SIN); Tao Li; Samantha Yeo; Quah Ting Wen; Amanda Lim	4:13.02	Thailand (THA); Natthanan Junkrajang; Chavunnooch Salubluek; Supasuta Sounthornchote; Benjaporn Sriphanomthorn	4:15.52	Malaysia (MAS); Erika Kong; Christina Loh; Yap Siew Hui; Khoo Cai Lin	4:17.77

== Diving ==
=== Men ===
Event	Gold		Silver		Bronze	
3m Springboard	Ooi Tze Liang (MAS)	431.90	Mark Lee Han Ming (SIN)	324.15	Chew Yi Wei (MAS)	314.20
3m Springboard (Sync)	Malaysia (MAS); Ooi Tze Liang; Ahmad Amsyar Azman	373.35	Singapore (SIN); Timothy Lee Han Kuan; Mark Lee Han Ming	336.45	Indonesia (INA); Akhmad Sukran Jamjami; Adityo Restu Putra	334.62
10m Platform	(Malaysia) Muhammad Nazreen Abdullah	398.05	(Malaysia) Ooi Tze Liang	397.20	(Indonesia) Adityo Restu Putra	338.00
10m Platform (Sync)	Malaysia (MAS); Ooi Tze Liang; Muhammad Nazreen Abdullah	386.28	Indonesia (INA); Andriyan; Adityo Restu Putra	327.51	Singapore (SIN); Timothy Lee Han Kuan; Mark Lee Han Ming	300.24

=== Women ===
Event	Gold		Silver		Bronze	
3m Springboard	(Malaysia) Cheong Jun Hoong	327.15	(Malaysia) Ng Yan Yee	323.10	(Indonesia) Eka Purnama Indah	240.35
3m Springboard (Sync)	Malaysia (MAS); Ng Yan Yee; Cheong Jun Hoong	293.70	Indonesia (INA); Eka Purnama Indah; Dewi Setyaningsih	249.90	Singapore (SIN); Fong Kay Yian; Myra Lee Jia Wen	223.53
10m Platform	Pandelela Rinong Pamg (MAS)	346.60	Loh Zhiayi (MAS)	292.10	Hla Nandar (MYA)	233.15
10m Platform (Sync)	Malaysia (MAS); Nur Dhabitah Sabri; Leong Mun Yee	281.64	Myanmar (MYA); Nay Chi Su Su Latt; Saw Hla Nandar	239.91	Indonesia (INA); Dewi Setyaningsih; Linadini Yasmin	239.46

== Water polo ==
=== Result ===
Event	Gold	Silver	Bronze
Men	Singapore (SIN); Sin Chao Nigel Tay; Diyang Lin; Zhi Zhi Loh; Zhen Wei Eugene Teo (c); Yao Xiang Lim; Jwee Ann Paul Louis Tan; Kunyang Chiam; Samuel Moses Nan Feng Yu; Zhi Hong Toh; Wei Ming Sean Ang; Yang Yip; Jian Ying Koh; Ruisheng Byron Quek	Indonesia (INA); Zuliansyah; Beby Willy Eka Paksi Tarigan; Delvin Felliciano; Sylvester Goldberg Manik; Andi Muhammad Uwayzulqarni; Benny Respati; Soederman Prayogo; Rezza Auditya Putra (c); Brandley Ignatius Legawa; Ridjkie Mulia; Zaenal Arifin; Novendra Deni; Novian Dwi Putra	Thailand (THA); Naruedon Niwasakul; Pinit Chaisombat; Pattanit Chompoosang; Methat Srisabai; Patipol Phandphoung (c); Ronnakrit Jarananon; Meathus Chetamee; Kanawat Wattanarungruang; Natthaphon Sangworatham; Sornthum Wongpairoj; Terdtong Klinubol; Thanayut Kingsakul; Wanjak Suwanchart

== Medal table ==
* Host nation (Myanmar)

Rank	Nation	Gold	Silver	Bronze	Total
1	Singapore (SIN)	13	10	12	35
2	Malaysia (MAS)	12	7	5	24
3	Thailand (THA)	7	9	9	25
4	Vietnam (VIE)	5	5	2	12
5	Indonesia (INA)	4	8	8	20
6	Philippines (PHI)	0	1	3	4
7	Myanmar (MYA)*	0	1	2	3
Totals (7 entries)		41	41	41	123

Preceded by 2011	Aquatics at the Southeast Asian Games; 2013 Southeast Asian Games	Succeeded by 2015
