= Shooting at the 2013 SEA Games – Women's 50 metre rifle prone =

The Women's 50 metre rifle prone event at the 2013 SEA Games took place on 12 December 2013 at the North Dagon Shooting Range in Yangon, Myanmar.

Each shooter fired 60 shots with a .22 Long Rifle at 50 metres distance from the prone position. Scores for each shot were in increments of 1, with a maximum score of 10.

== Schedule ==
All times are Myanmar Standard Time (UTC+06:30)

The schedule is given by:

Date	Time	Event
Thursday, 12 December 2013	09:00	Final

== Results ==
Rank	Athlete	Country	1	2	3	4	5	6	Total	Inner 10s	Notes
1st place, gold medalist(s)	Thu Thu Kyaw	Myanmar	100	98	98	100	100	99	595	37	
2nd place, silver medalist(s)	Thanyalak Chotphibunsin	Thailand	98	99	100	99	100	98	594	36	
3rd place, bronze medalist(s)	Ratchadaporn Plengsaengthong	Thailand	100	97	100	95	99	100	591	28	
4	Vitchuda Pichitkanjanakul	Thailand	99	99	99	97	99	97	590	34	
5	Ser Xiang Wei Jasmine	Singapore	96	99	98	98	98	100	589	37	
6	Aye Aye Thin	Myanmar	98	99	99	97	99	95	587	28	
7	Maharani Ardy	Indonesia	97	96	99	100	98	96	586	29	
8	Than Than Saw	Myanmar	98	99	100	96	94	98	585	25	
9	Nguyen Thi Phuong	Vietnam	96	97	98	96	97	99	583	28	
10	Muslifah Zulkifli	Malaysia	96	95	100	97	96	99	583	28	
11	Nur Suryani Mohd Taibi	Malaysia	96	96	95	97	98	100	582	27	
12	Cheng Jian Huan	Singapore	99	98	99	98	91	96	581	23	
13	Nguyen Thi Xuan	Vietnam	96	98	96	97	97	96	580	25	
14	Erlinawati Chailid	Indonesia	99	97	99	94	94	95	578	23	
15	Le Thi Anh Dao	Vietnam	94	96	96	96	97	96	575	24	
16	Haslisa Hamed	Malaysia	93	95	97	96	96	97	574	22	
17	Rachma Saraswati	Indonesia	95	94	90	94	93	94	560	14	
-	Aqilah Binte Sudhir	Singapore							DNS		
