= Pencak silat at the 2013 SEA Games =

Pencak Silat at the 2013 SEA Games was held at Zayyarthiri Sports Complex, Naypyidaw, Myanmar between December 8–15.

== Medalists ==
=== Artistic ===
Event	Gold	Silver	Bronze
Men's singles	Gusti Ngurah Arya Yuda Parmita; Indonesia	Htet Wai Hlaing; Myanmar	Ilyas Sadara; Thailand
Women's singles	Dewa Ayu Ari Parwiti; Indonesia	Nattanin Sornsoonthorn; Thailand	Khin Khin Khant; Myanmar
Men's doubles	Myanmar; Ye Maung Maung; Thu Ya Soe	Vietnam; Nguyễn Danh Phương; Đặng Quốc Bảo	Singapore; Muhammad Nurshahrin Shahrudin; Sheik Ferdous Sheik Alauddin
Women's doubles	Malaysia; Nor Hamizah Abu Hassan; Nur Syazreen A Malik	Vietnam; Nguyễn Thị Lan; Nguyễn Thị Thu Hà	Myanmar; Su Myat Mon; Khin Thet Mon Oo
Men's team	Indonesia; Muhsin Anwar Tahir; I Made Alex Dwi Putra; Lisman	Myanmar; Htet Aung; Min Khant; Hein Min Lat	Brunei; Abdul Malik Ladi; Awang Abd Rahman; Juffri Haji Junaidi

=== Tarung ===
==== Men ====
Event	Gold	Silver	Bronze
45–50 kg	Zay Yar; Myanmar	Awaluddin Nur; Indonesia	Panja Ngoentim; Thailand
45–50 kg	Zay Yar; Myanmar	Awaluddin Nur; Indonesia	Diệp Ngọc Vũ Minh; Vietnam
50–55 kg	Nanthachai Khansakhon; Thailand	Võ Duy Phương; Vietnam	Johan; Indonesia
50–55 kg	Nanthachai Khansakhon; Thailand	Võ Duy Phương; Vietnam	Muhamad Heli Abd Aziz; Malaysia
55–60 kg	Mohamad Adhan Rusdin; Indonesia	Ye Kyaw Thu; Myanmar	Muhammad Saiful Syazwan Rahmat; Malaysia
55–60 kg	Mohamad Adhan Rusdin; Indonesia	Ye Kyaw Thu; Myanmar	Prasit Warlam; Thailand
60–65 kg	Kyaw Naing Tun; Myanmar	Ahmad Shahril Zailudin; Malaysia	Sapto Purnomo; Indonesia
60–65 kg	Kyaw Naing Tun; Myanmar	Ahmad Shahril Zailudin; Malaysia	Sakda Omkaeo; Thailand
65–70 kg	Mohd Al Jufferi Jamari; Malaysia	Đặng Toàn Thắng; Vietnam	Kyaw Swar Win; Myanmar
65–70 kg	Mohd Al Jufferi Jamari; Malaysia	Đặng Toàn Thắng; Vietnam	Somkid Rakjun; Thailand
70–75 kg	Muhammad Nur Alfian Jumaen; Singapore	Phạm Văn Tý; Vietnam	Almad Siregar; Indonesia
70–75 kg	Muhammad Nur Alfian Jumaen; Singapore	Phạm Văn Tý; Vietnam	Mohd Fauzi Khalid; Malaysia
75–80 kg	Nguyễn Duy Tuyến; Vietnam	Ye Thi Ha; Myanmar	Ak Mohd Khairul Bahri Pg Aliumar; Brunei
75–80 kg	Nguyễn Duy Tuyến; Vietnam	Ye Thi Ha; Myanmar	Katahat Raksapon; Thailand
80–85 kg	Lê Sĩ Kiên; Vietnam	Nyoman Ardika Saputrawan; Indonesia	Muhammad Shakir Juanda; Singapore
80–85 kg	Lê Sĩ Kiên; Vietnam	Nyoman Ardika Saputrawan; Indonesia	Wacharapong Intho; Thailand

==== Women ====
Event	Gold	Silver	Bronze
55–60 kg	Rewadee Damsri; Thailand	Wewey Wita; Indonesia	Siti Zubaidah Che Omar; Malaysia
55–60 kg	Rewadee Damsri; Thailand	Wewey Wita; Indonesia	Nerlyn Huinda; Philippines
70–75 kg	Nguyễn Thị Yến; Vietnam	Mariati; Indonesia	Clyde Joy Baria; Philippines
70–75 kg	Nguyễn Thị Yến; Vietnam	Mariati; Indonesia	Monruthai Bangsalad; Thailand

== Medal table ==
* Host nation (Myanmar)

Rank	Nation	Gold	Silver	Bronze	Total
1	Indonesia (INA)	4	4	3	11
2	Vietnam (VIE)	3	5	1	9
3	Myanmar (MYA)*	3	4	3	10
4	Thailand (THA)	2	1	8	11
5	Malaysia (MAS)	2	1	4	7
6	Singapore (SIN)	1	0	2	3
7	Brunei (BRU)	0	0	2	2
7	Philippines (PHI)	0	0	2	2
Totals (8 entries)		15	15	25	55
