= Billiards and snooker at the 2013 SEA Games =

Southeast asian event

Billiards and Snooker at the 2013 SEA Games

Billiards and snooker in the 27th SEA Games took place at Wunna Theikdi Billiard & Snooker Indoor Stadium in Naypyidaw, Myanmar between December 13–20.

== Medal table ==
* Host nation (Myanmar)

| Rank | Nation | Gold | Silver | Bronze | Total |
|---|---|---|---|---|---|
| 1 | Thailand (THA) | 4 | 1 | 2 | 7 |
| 2 | Philippines (PHI) | 2 | 2 | 3 | 7 |
| 3 | Indonesia (INA) | 2 | 1 | 1 | 4 |
| 4 | Myanmar (MYA)* | 1 | 5 | 5 | 11 |
| 5 | Vietnam (VIE) | 1 | 1 | 6 | 8 |
| 6 | Malaysia (MAS) | 1 | 1 | 3 | 5 |
| 7 | Singapore (SIN) | 1 | 0 | 4 | 5 |
| 8 | Laos (LAO) | 0 | 1 | 0 | 1 |
| Totals (8 entries) | | 12 | 12 | 24 | 48 |

== Medal summary ==
=== Men ===
| Event | Gold | Silver | Bronze |
|---|---|---|---|
| 9 ball pool singles | Ricky Yang; Indonesia | Tan Kah Thiam; Malaysia | Nitiwat Kanjanasri; Thailand |
| 9 ball pool singles | Ricky Yang; Indonesia | Tan Kah Thiam; Malaysia | Aung Moe Thu; Myanmar |
| 10 ball pool singles | Dennis Orcollo; Philippines | Carlo Biado; Philippines | Nguyen Anh Tuan; Vietnam |
| 10 ball pool singles | Dennis Orcollo; Philippines | Carlo Biado; Philippines | Dang Thanh Kien; Vietnam |

=== Women ===
| Event | Gold | Silver | Bronze |
|---|---|---|---|
| 9 ball pool singles | Angelina Magdalena Ticoalu; Indonesia | Rubilen Amit; Philippines | Doan Thi Ngoc Le; Vietnam |
| 9 ball pool singles | Angelina Magdalena Ticoalu; Indonesia | Rubilen Amit; Philippines | Ami Aung; Myanmar |
| 10 ball pool singles | Rubilen Amit; Philippines | Angelina Magdalena Ticoalu; Indonesia | Iris Ranola; Philippines |
| 10 ball pool singles | Rubilen Amit; Philippines | Angelina Magdalena Ticoalu; Indonesia | Thi Ngoc Huyen Huynh; Vietnam |

=== Mixed ===
| Event | Gold | Silver | Bronze |
|---|---|---|---|
| Carom 1 cushion singles | Dang Dinh Tien; Vietnam | Ma Minh Cam; Vietnam | Francisco Dela Cruz; Philippines |
| Carom 1 cushion singles | Dang Dinh Tien; Vietnam | Ma Minh Cam; Vietnam | Efren Reyes; Philippines |
| English billiard singles | Peter Edward Gilchrist; Singapore | Nay Thway Oo; Myanmar | Aung San Oo; Myanmar |
| English billiard singles | Peter Edward Gilchrist; Singapore | Nay Thway Oo; Myanmar | Praprut Chaithanasakun; Thailand |
| English billiard doubles | Thailand (THA); Praprut Chaithanasakun; Thawat Sujaritthurakarn | Myanmar (MYA); Aung San Oo; Nay Thway Oo | Singapore (SIN); Keng Kwang Chan; Peter Edward Gilchrist |
| English billiard doubles | Thailand (THA); Praprut Chaithanasakun; Thawat Sujaritthurakarn | Myanmar (MYA); Aung San Oo; Nay Thway Oo | Vietnam (VIE); Thanh Binh Nguyen; Hoai Nam Pham |
| English scotch billiard doubles | Thailand (THA); Praprut Chaithanasakun; Suriya Suwannasingh | Myanmar (MYA); Nay Thway Oo; Aung Htay | Singapore (SIN); Keng Kwang Chan; Peter Edward Gilchrist |
| English scotch billiard doubles | Thailand (THA); Praprut Chaithanasakun; Suriya Suwannasingh | Myanmar (MYA); Nay Thway Oo; Aung Htay | Vietnam (VIE); Thanh Binh Nguyen; Hoai Nam Pham |
| English billiard teams | Myanmar (MYA); Nay Thway Oo; Aung Htay | Thailand (THA); Praprut Chaithanasakun; Thawat Sujaritthurakarn | Singapore (SIN); Keng Kwang Chan; Peter Edward Gilchrist |
| English billiard teams | Myanmar (MYA); Nay Thway Oo; Aung Htay | Thailand (THA); Praprut Chaithanasakun; Thawat Sujaritthurakarn | Indonesia (INA); Hekta; Jaka Kurniawan |
| Snooker singles | Issara Kachaiwong; Thailand | Win Ko Ko; Myanmar | Thor Chuan Leong; Malaysia |
| Snooker singles | Issara Kachaiwong; Thailand | Win Ko Ko; Myanmar | Moh Keen Hoo; Malaysia |
| 6 red snooker singles | Thor Chuan Leong; Malaysia | Sithideth Sakbieng; Laos | Win Khaing Min Aye; Myanmar |
| 6 red snooker singles | Thor Chuan Leong; Malaysia | Sithideth Sakbieng; Laos | Zaw Ye Htut; Myanmar |
| Snooker doubles | Thailand (THA); Issara Kachaiwong; Pramual Jantad | Myanmar (MYA); Win Khaing Min Aye; Win Ko Ko | Malaysia (MAS); Thor Chuan Leong; Moh Keen Hoo |
| Snooker doubles | Thailand (THA); Issara Kachaiwong; Pramual Jantad | Myanmar (MYA); Win Khaing Min Aye; Win Ko Ko | Singapore (SIN); Ang Chin Boon; Lim Chun Kiat |

== Results ==
=== Men's ===
==== 9 ball pool singles ====
Preliminary; 15 December
Nguyen Phuong Thao (VIE)
Phisith Phonepaseuth (LAO) | WO
Nitiwat Kanjanasri (THA) | 9
Zaw Win Cho (MYA) | 7
Ibrahim Bin Amir (MAS) | 8
Dennis Orcollo (PHI) | 9
Nguyen Khanh Hoang (VIE) | 6
Kah Thiam Tan (MAS) | 9
Ahmad Taufiq M Murni (BRU) | 8
Tanut Makkamontee (THA) | 9
Aung Moe Thu (MYA) | 9
Carlo Biado (PHI) | 6
Hongsavady Vongxay (LAO) | 9
Irsal Afrinneza Nasution (INA) | 4

Quarterfinal; 16 December
Ricky Yang (INA) | 9
Nguyen Phuong Thao (VIE) | 7
Nitiwat Kanjanasri (THA) | 9
Dennis Orcollo (PHI) | 6
Kah Thiam Tan (MAS) | 9
Tanut Makkamontee (THA) | 4
Aung Moe Thu (MYA) | 9
Hongsavady Vongxay (LAO) | 8

Semifinal; 16 December
Ricky Yang (INA) | 9
Nitiwat Kanjanasri (THA) | 5
Kah Thiam Tan (MAS) | 9
Aung Moe Thu (MYA) | 5

Final; 16 December
Ricky Yang (INA) | 9
Kah Thiam Tan (MAS) | 7

==== 10 ball pool singles ====
Preliminary; 17 December
Hongsavady Vongxay (LAO) | 8
Nguyễn Anh Tuấn (VIE) | 9
Ko Htet (MYA) | 6
Muhammad Zulfikri (INA) | 9
Kah Thiam Tan (MAS) | 5
Nitiwat Kanjanasri (THA) | 9
Dennis Orcollo (PHI) | 9
Ahmad Taufiq M Murni (BRU) | 5
Riyan Setiawan (INA) | 6
Carlo Biado (PHI) | 9
Keng Kwang Chan (SIN) | 9
Tanut Makkamontee (THA) | 1
Phone Myint Kyaw (MYA) | 9
Ibrahim Bin Amir (MAS) | 7
Dang Thanh Kien (VIE)
Phisith Phonepaseuth (LAO) | WO

Quarterfinal; 18 December
Nguyễn Anh Tuấn (VIE) | 9
Muhammad Zulfikri (INA) | 6
Nitiwat Kanjanasri (THA) | 3
Dennis Orcollo (PHI) | 9
Carlo Biado (PHI) | 9
Keng Kwang Chan (SIN) | 4
Phone Myint Kyaw (MYA) | 1
Dang Thanh Kien (VIE) | 9

Semifinal; 18 December
Nguyễn Anh Tuấn (VIE) | 4
Dennis Orcollo (PHI) | 9
Carlo Biado (PHI) | 9
Dang Thanh Kien (VIE) | 3

Final; 18 December
Dennis Orcollo (PHI) | 9
Carlo Biado (PHI) | 7

=== Women's ===
==== 9 ball pool singles ====
Preliminary; 13 December
Fathrah Ma'sum (INA) | 7
Thandar Maung (MYA) | 4
Zeet Huey Charlene Chai (SIN) | 7
Klaudia Djajalie (MAS) | 6
Amornrat Uamduang (THA) | 5
Doan Thi Ngoc Le (VIE) | 7
Shu Wah Hoe (SIN) | 4
Thi Ngoc Huyen Huynh (VIE) | 7
Ami Aung (MYA) | 7
Siraphat Chitchomnart (THA) | 4
Suhana Dewi Binti Sabtu (MAS) | 1
Angeline Magdalena Ticoalu (INA) | 7

Quarterfinal; 14 December
Rubilen Amit (PHI) | 7
Fathrah Ma'sum (INA) | 4
Zeet Huey Charlene Chai (SIN) | 2
Doan Thi Ngoc Le (VIE) | 7
Thi Ngoc Huyen Huynh (VIE) | 5
Ami Aung (MYA) | 7
Angeline Magdalena Ticoalu (INA) | 7
Iris Ranola (PHI) | 2

Semifinal; 14 December
Rubilen Amit (PHI) | 7
Doan Thi Ngoc Le (VIE) | 6
Ami Aung (MYA) | 6
Angeline Magdalena Ticoalu (INA) | 7

Final; 14 December
Rubilen Amit (PHI) | 2
Angeline Magdalena Ticoalu (INA) | 7

==== 10 ball pool singles ====
Preliminary; 19 December
Zeet Huey Charlene Chai (SIN) | 4
Iris Ranola (PHI) | 7
Siraphat Chitchomnart (THA) | 7
Doan Thi Ngoc Le (VIE) | 4
Angeline Magdalena Ticoalu (INA) | 7
Klaudia Djajalie (MAS) | 1
Amornrat Uamduang (THA) | 7
Suhana Dewi Binti Sabtu (MAS) | 6
Thi Ngoc Huyen Huynh (VIE) | 7
Amanda Rahayu (INA) | 6
Shu Wah Hoe (SIN) | 4
Rubilen Amit (PHI) | 7

Quarterfinal; 20 December
Thandar Maung (MYA) | 2
Iris Ranola (PHI) | 7
Siraphat Chitchomnart (THA) | 6
Angeline Magdalena Ticoalu (INA) | 7
Amornrat Uamduang (THA) | 4
Thi Ngoc Huyen Huynh (VIE) | 7
Rubilen Amit (PHI) | 7
Nywe Nywe Hlaing (MYA) | 1

Semifinal; 20 December
Iris Ranola (PHI) | 2
Angeline Magdalena Ticoalu (INA) | 7
Thi Ngoc Huyen Huynh (VIE) | 1
Rubilen Amit (PHI) | 7

Final; 20 December
Angeline Magdalena Ticoalu (INA) | 2
Rubilen Amit (PHI) | 7

=== Mixed ===
==== Carom 1 cushion singles ====
| Quarterfinal; December 14 | | Semifinal; December 14 | | Final; December 15 |
| Dang Dinh Tien (VIE) | 100 |
| Rudy Hasan (INA) | 24 | Dang Dinh Tien (VIE) | 100 |
| Thongchai Punyawee (THA) | 25 | Francisco Dela Cruz (PHI) | 39 |
| Francisco Dela Cruz (PHI) | 87 | | | Dang Dinh Tien (VIE) | 100 |
| Minh Cam Ma (VIE) | 100 | | | Minh Cam Ma (VIE) | 85 |
| Chit Ko Ko (MYA) | 32 | Minh Cam Ma (VIE) | 100 |
| Suriya Suwannasingh (THA) | 47 | Efren Reyes (PHI) | 58 |
| Efren Reyes (PHI) | 100 |

==== English billiard singles ====
Preliminary; 18 December
Thawat Sujaritthurakarn (THA) | 3
Hekta Hekta (INA) | 0

Quarterfinal; 20 December
Peter Edward Gilchrist (SIN) | 3
Thawat Sujaritthurakarn (THA) | 0
Nguyen Trung Kien (VIE) | 1
Aung San Oo (MYA) | 3
Nay Thway Oo (MYA) | 3
Jaka Kurniawan (INA) | 0
Nguyen Thanh Binh (VIE) | 1
Praprut Chaithanasakun (THA) | 3

Semifinal; 20 December
Peter Edward Gilchrist (SIN) | 3
Aung San Oo (MYA) | 0
Nay Thway Oo (MYA) | 3
Praprut Chaithanasakun (THA) | 1

Final; 20 December
Peter Edward Gilchrist (SIN) | 3
Nay Thway Oo (MYA) | 2

==== English billiard doubles ====
| Quarterfinal; December 19 | | Semifinal; December 19 | | Final; December 19 |
| | | Praprut Chaithanasakun (THA); Thawat Sujaritthurakarn (THA) | 3 |
| Hekta Hekta (INA); Jaka Kurniawan (INA) | 0 | Peter Edward Gilchrist (SIN); Keng Kwang Chan (SIN) | 1 |
| Peter Edward Gilchrist (SIN); Keng Kwang Chan (SIN) | 3 | | | Praprut Chaithanasakun (THA); Thawat Sujaritthurakarn (THA) | 3 |
| | | | | Nay Thway Oo (MYA); Aung San Oo (MYA) | 1 |
| | | Nguyen Thanh Binh (VIE); Pham Hoai Nam (VIE) | 0 |
| | | Nay Thway Oo (MYA); Aung San Oo (MYA) | 3 |

==== English scotch billiard doubles ====
| Quarterfinal; December 16 | | Semifinal; December 16 | | Final; December 16 |
| | | Nay Thway Oo (MYA); Aung Htay (MYA) | 3 |
| Hekta Hekta (INA); Jaka Kurniawan (INA) | 1 | Peter Edward Gilchrist (SIN); Keng Kwang Chan (SIN) | 0 |
| Peter Edward Gilchrist (SIN); Keng Kwang Chan (SIN) | 3 | | | Nay Thway Oo (MYA); Aung Htay (MYA) | 1 |
| | | | | Praprut Chaithanasakun (THA); Suriya Suwannasingh (THA) | 3 |
| | | Nguyen Thanh Binh (VIE); Pham Hoai Nam (VIE) | 1 |
| | | Praprut Chaithanasakun (THA); Suriya Suwannasingh (THA) | 3 |

==== English billiard teams ====
| Quarterfinal; December 15 | | Semifinal; December 15 | | Final; December 15 |
| | | Singapore (SIN) | 2 |
| Thailand (THA) | 3 | Thailand (THA) | 3 |
| Vietnam (VIE) | 1 | | | Thailand (THA) | 2 |
| | | | | Myanmar (MYA) | 3 |
| | | Indonesia (INA) | 0 |
| | | Myanmar (MYA) | 3 |

==== Snooker singles ====
Preliminary; 17 December
Issara Kachaiwong (THA) | 4
Sithideth Sakbieng (LAO) | 0
Zaw Than Htike (MYA) | 4
Thien Khoi Kieu (VIE) | 2
Yoni Rachmanto (INA)
Rodolfo Jr Lordan (PHI) | WO
Boon Chin Ang (SIN) | 2
Thor Chuan Leong (MAS) | 4
Win Ko Ko (MYA) | 4
Suriya Minalavogn (LAO) | 1
Michael Angelo Mengorio (PHI) | WO
Rudy Sulaeman (INA)
Keen Hoo Moh (MAS) | 4
Phan Van Kien (VIE) | 1
Yuttapop Pakpoj (THA) | 3
Lim Chun Kiat (SIN) | 4

Quarterfinal; 17 December
Issara Kachaiwong (THA) | 4
Zaw Than Htike (MYA) | 0
Yoni Rachmanto (INA) | 0
Thor Chuan Leong (MAS) | 4
Win Ko Ko (MYA) | 4
Rudy Sulaeman (INA) | 2
Keen Hoo Moh (MAS) | 4
Lim Chun Kiat (SIN) | 2

Semifinal; 18 December
Issara Kachaiwong (THA) | 4
Thor Chuan Leong (MAS) | 1
Win Ko Ko (MYA) | 4
Keen Hoo Moh (MAS) | 1

Final; 18 December
Issara Kachaiwong (THA) | 4
Win Ko Ko (MYA) | 1

==== 6 red snooker singles ====
Preliminary; 14 December
Supoj Saenla (THA) | 5
Thien Khoi Kieu (VIE) | 1
Thor Chuan Leong (MAS) | 5
Boon Chin Ang (SIN) | 1
Yoni Rachmanto (INA) | 0
Win Khaing Min Aye (MYA) | 5
Rodolfo Jr Lordan (PHI) | WO
Daophachan Phouthabandit (LAO)
Rudy Sulaeman (INA) | 3
Sithideth Sakbieng (LAO) | 5
Michael Angelo Mengorio (PHI) | WO
Keen Hoo Moh (MAS)
Ye Zaw Htut (MYA) | 5
Phan Van Kien (VIE) | 2
Lim Chun Kiat (SIN) | 5
Boonyarit Kaettikun (THA) | 4

Quarterfinal; 14 December
Supoj Saenla (THA) | 2
Thor Chuan Leong (MAS) | 5
Win Khaing Min Aye (MYA) | 5
Daophachan Phouthabandit (LAO) | 0
Sithideth Sakbieng (LAO) | 5
Keen Hoo Moh (MAS) | 2
Ye Zaw Htut (MYA) | 5
Lim Chun Kiat (SIN) | 3

Semifinal; 15 December
Thor Chuan Leong (MAS) | 5
Win Khaing Min Aye (MYA) | 0
Sithideth Sakbieng (LAO) | 5
Ye Zaw Htut (MYA) | 0

Final; 15 December
Thor Chuan Leong (MAS) | 5
Sithideth Sakbieng (LAO) | 4

==== Snooker doubles ====
| Quarterfinal; December 13 | | Semifinal; December 13 | | Final; December 13 |
| Keen Hoo Moh (MAS); Thor Chuan Leong (MAS) | 3 |
| Rudy Sulaeman (INA); Yoni Rachmanto (INA) | 2 | Keen Hoo Moh (MAS); Thor Chuan Leong (MAS) | 0 |
| Michael Angelo Mengorio (PHI); Rodolfo Jr Lordan (PHI) | WO | Issara Kachaiwong (THA); Pramual Jantad (THA) | 3 |
| Issara Kachaiwong (THA); Pramual Jantad (THA) | | | | Issara Kachaiwong (THA); Pramual Jantad (THA) | 3 |
| Win Ko Ko (MYA); Win Khaing Min Aye (MYA) | 3 | | | Win Ko Ko (MYA); Win Khaing Min Aye (MYA) | 0 |
| Thien Khoi Kieu (VIE); Phan Van Kien (VIE) | 1 | Win Ko Ko (MYA); Win Khaing Min Aye (MYA) | 3 |
| Daophachan Phouthabandit (LAO); Sithideth Sakbieng (LAO) | 0 | Boon Chin Ang (SIN); Lim Chun Kiat (SIN) | 1 |
| Boon Chin Ang (SIN); Lim Chun Kiat (SIN) | 3 |
