= Karate at the 2013 SEA Games =

Karate at the 2013 SEA Games was held at Wunna Theikdi Indoor Stadium, Naypyidaw, Myanmar between 13–15 December.

== Medal table ==
* Host nation (Myanmar)

Rank	Nation	Gold	Silver	Bronze	Total
1	Malaysia (MAS)	7	3	5	15
2	Vietnam (VIE)	3	3	7	13
3	Indonesia (INA)	2	7	7	16
4	Myanmar (MYA)*	2	2	6	10
5	Thailand (THA)	2	0	4	6
6	Philippines (PHI)	1	1	1	3
7	Brunei (BRU)	0	1	1	2
8	Laos (LAO)	0	0	3	3
Totals (8 entries)		17	17	34	68

== Medalists ==
=== Kata ===
Event	Gold	Silver	Bronze
Men's individual	Lim Chee Wei; Malaysia	Min Hein Khant; Myanmar	Faizal Zainuddin; Indonesia
Men's individual	Lim Chee Wei; Malaysia	Min Hein Khant; Myanmar	Amkha Vongphachan; Laos
Women's individual	Nguyễn Hoàng Ngân; Vietnam	Yulianti Syafrudin; Indonesia	Yin Wah Thaung Luai; Myanmar
Women's individual	Nguyễn Hoàng Ngân; Vietnam	Yulianti Syafrudin; Indonesia	Thaviphone Salichane; Laos
Men's team	Malaysia; Lim Chee Wei; Emmanuel Leong; Wai Tze	Myanmar; Aung Khant; Kyaw Kyaw Tun; Min Hein Khant	Indonesia; Aswar; Faizal Zainuddin; Fidelys Lolobua
Men's team	Malaysia; Lim Chee Wei; Emmanuel Leong; Wai Tze	Myanmar; Aung Khant; Kyaw Kyaw Tun; Min Hein Khant	Vietnam; Nguyễn Mạnh Hải; Thạch Văn Thành; Lê Xuân Hùng
Women's team	Myanmar; Poe Myar; Swe Swe Aung; Thazin Aye	Vietnam; Nguyễn Hoàng Ngân; Nguyễn Thanh Hằng; Đỗ Thị Thu Hà	Indonesia; Ayu Rahmawati; Eva Fitria Setiawati; Siti Maryam
Women's team	Myanmar; Poe Myar; Swe Swe Aung; Thazin Aye	Vietnam; Nguyễn Hoàng Ngân; Nguyễn Thanh Hằng; Đỗ Thị Thu Hà	Malaysia; Celine Lee; Yee Voon Khaw; Zoey Wong

=== Kumite ===
==== Men ====
Event	Gold	Silver	Bronze
55 kg	Ramon Antonino Franco; Philippines	Muhammad Fada'iy Sanif; Brunei	Iman Tauhid Ragananda; Indonesia
55 kg	Ramon Antonino Franco; Philippines	Muhammad Fada'iy Sanif; Brunei	Kunasilan Lakanathan; Malaysia
60 kg	Senthil Kumaran Silvarajoo; Malaysia	Donny Dharmawan; Indonesia	Trần Minh Đức; Vietnam
60 kg	Senthil Kumaran Silvarajoo; Malaysia	Donny Dharmawan; Indonesia	Mairul Mohammad; Brunei
67 kg	Jintar Simanjuntak; Indonesia	Sharmendran Raghonathan; Malaysia	Tin Tun Aung; Myanmar
67 kg	Jintar Simanjuntak; Indonesia	Sharmendran Raghonathan; Malaysia	Nguyễn Ngọc Thành; Vietnam
75 kg	Aye Chan Naing; Myanmar	Christo Mondolu; Indonesia	Shaharudin Jamaludin; Malaysia
75 kg	Aye Chan Naing; Myanmar	Christo Mondolu; Indonesia	Songvut Muntaen; Thailand
84 kg	Theerapat Kangtong; Thailand	Hendro Salim; Indonesia	Bùi Như Mỹ; Vietnam
84 kg	Theerapat Kangtong; Thailand	Hendro Salim; Indonesia	Mohd Hatta Mahamut; Malaysia
+84 kg	Umar Syarief; Indonesia	Theebaan Govindasamy; Malaysia	Phạm Quang Duy; Vietnam
+84 kg	Umar Syarief; Indonesia	Theebaan Govindasamy; Malaysia	Sutthichai Takhieo; Thailand
Team kumite	Thailand; Anuwat Damrongveeravit; Pholwasin Saratham; Piyangkul Sawangsri; Songvut Muntaen; Supa Ngamphuengphit; Sutthichai Takhieo; Theerapat Kangtong	Malaysia; Govinash Rajakumar; Mohd Hatta Mahamut; Shaharudin Jamaludin; Sharrma Jayaraman; Theebaan Govindasamy; Sharmendran Raghonathan; Harry Majohn	Vietnam; Võ Hào Trình; Nguyễn Huy Thành; Nguyễn Minh Phụng; Nguyễn Ngọc Thành; Bùi Như Mỹ; Phạm Quang Duy; Nguyễn Văn Sử
Team kumite	Thailand; Anuwat Damrongveeravit; Pholwasin Saratham; Piyangkul Sawangsri; Songvut Muntaen; Supa Ngamphuengphit; Sutthichai Takhieo; Theerapat Kangtong	Malaysia; Govinash Rajakumar; Mohd Hatta Mahamut; Shaharudin Jamaludin; Sharrma Jayaraman; Theebaan Govindasamy; Sharmendran Raghonathan; Harry Majohn	Indonesia; Angga Laksmana; Hendro Salim; Umar Syarief; Donny Dharmawan; Iman Tauhid Ragananda; Jintar Simanjuntak; Christo Mondolu

==== Women ====
Event	Gold	Silver	Bronze
50 kg	Vũ Thị Nguyệt Ánh; Vietnam	Srunita Sari Sukatendel; Indonesia	Paweena Raksachart; Thailand
50 kg	Vũ Thị Nguyệt Ánh; Vietnam	Srunita Sari Sukatendel; Indonesia	April Phaw; Myanmar
55 kg	Nisha Alagasan; Malaysia	Mae Soriano; Philippines	Tippawan Khamsi; Thailand
55 kg	Nisha Alagasan; Malaysia	Mae Soriano; Philippines	Win Thuzar Min; Myanmar
61 kg	Syakilla Salni Jefry Krisnan; Malaysia	Le Thi Thuy; Vietnam	Nway Nway Zaw Win; Myanmar
61 kg	Syakilla Salni Jefry Krisnan; Malaysia	Le Thi Thuy; Vietnam	Cok Istri Agung Sanistyarani; Indonesia
68 kg	Shree Sharmini Segaran; Malaysia	Phạm Thị Tiến; Vietnam	Indah Mogia Angkat; Indonesia
68 kg	Shree Sharmini Segaran; Malaysia	Phạm Thị Tiến; Vietnam	Joanna Mae Ylanan; Philippines
+68 kg	Lăng Thị Hoa; Vietnam	Wiwi Pertiwi; Indonesia	Jamalliah Jamaludin; Malaysia
+68 kg	Lăng Thị Hoa; Vietnam	Wiwi Pertiwi; Indonesia	Vannasone Donesavanh; Laos
Team kumite	Malaysia; Nisha Alagasan; Nur Eleena Anis Ab Malik; Shree Sharmini Segaran; Syakilla Salni Jefry Krisnan	Indonesia; Intan Nurjanah; Srunita Sari Sukatendel; Cok Istri Agung Sanistyarani; Indah Mogia Angkat	Myanmar; April Phaw; Nway Nway Zaw Win; Win Thuzar Min; Zung Len Cer
Team kumite	Malaysia; Nisha Alagasan; Nur Eleena Anis Ab Malik; Shree Sharmini Segaran; Syakilla Salni Jefry Krisnan	Indonesia; Intan Nurjanah; Srunita Sari Sukatendel; Cok Istri Agung Sanistyarani; Indah Mogia Angkat	Vietnam; Trần Hoàng Yến Phượng; Lăng Thị Hoa; Vũ Thị Nguyệt Ánh; Phạm Thị Tiến

== Results ==
=== Kata ===
==== Men's individual ====
- 13 December 2013

Quarterfinal
Min Hein Khant (MYA)	4
Orencio James Virgil De Los Santos (PHI)	1
BYE
Faizal Zainuddin (INA)
Lim Chee Wei (MAS)	5
Le Xuan Hung (VIE)	0
BYE
Amkha Vongphachan (LAO)

Semifinal
Min Hein Khant (MYA)	4
Faizal Zainuddin (INA)	1
Lim Chee Wei (MAS)	5
Amkha Vongphachan (LAO)	0

Final
Min Hein Khant (MYA)	0
Lim Chee Wei (MAS)	5

Bronze medal match
Orencio James Virgil De Los Santos (PHI)	0
Faizal Zainuddin (INA)	5
Le Xuan Hung (VIE)	2
Amkha Vongphachan (LAO)	3

==== Men's team ====
- 13 December 2013

Quarterfinal
Malaysia (MAS)	5
Indonesia (INA)	0
BYE
Laos (LAO)
Myanmar (MYA)
BYE
BYE
Vietnam (VIE)

Semifinal
Malaysia (MAS)	5
Laos (LAO)	0
Myanmar (MYA)	5
Vietnam (VIE)	0

Final
Malaysia (MAS)	4
Myanmar (MYA)	1

Bronze medal match
Indonesia (INA)	5
Laos (LAO)	0
BYE
Vietnam (VIE)

==== Women's individual ====
- 13 December 2013

Quarterfinal
Nguyen Hoang Ngan (VIE)	3
Yin Wah Thaung Luai (MYA)	2
BYE
Celine Xin Yi Lee (MAS)
BYE
Yulianti Syafrudin (INA)	0
BYE
Thaviphone Salichane (LAO)

Semifinal
Nguyen Hoang Ngan (VIE)	4
Celine Xin Yi Lee (MAS)	1
Yulianti Syafrudin (INA)	5
Thaviphone Salichane (LAO)	0

Final
Nguyen Hoang Ngan (VIE)	5
Yulianti Syafrudin (INA)	0

Bronze medal match
Yin Wah Thaung Luai (MYA)	4
Celine Xin Yi Lee (MAS)	1
BYE
Thaviphone Salichane (LAO)

==== Women's team ====
- 13 December 2013

Quarterfinal
Indonesia (INA)	5
Laos (LAO)	0
BYE
Myanmar (MYA)
Malaysia (MAS)
BYE
BYE
Vietnam (VIE)

Semifinal
Indonesia (INA)	0
Myanmar (MYA)	5
Malaysia (MAS)	0
Vietnam (VIE)	5

Final
Myanmar (MYA)	4
Vietnam (VIE)	1

Bronze medal match
BYE
Indonesia (INA)
BYE
Malaysia (MAS)

=== Kumite ===
==== Men's ====
===== 55 kg =====
- 14 December 2013

Quarterfinal		Semifinal		Final
Iman Tauhid Ragananda (INA)	3
Ramon Antonino Franco (PHI)	6	Ramon Antonino Franco (PHI)	6
Myint Maung Maung Hein (MYA)	3	Nguyen Phi Tuan (VIE)	2
Nguyen Phi Tuan (VIE)	4			Ramon Antonino Franco (PHI)	8
Muhammad Fada'iy Sanif (BRU)	7			Muhammad Fada'iy Sanif (BRU)	6
Kunasilan Lakanathan (MAS)	7	Muhammad Fada'iy Sanif (BRU)	4
Piyangkul Sawangsri (THA)	6	Piyangkul Sawangsri (THA)	2
Phonepaseuth Lasasimma (LAO)	1

Bronze medal match
Iman Tauhid Ragananda (INA)	5
Celine Xin Yi Lee (MAS)	0
Kunasilan Lakanathan (MAS)	7
Piyangkul Sawangsri (THA)	4

===== 60 kg =====
- 14 December 2013

Quarterfinal		Semifinal		Final
Anuwat Damrongveeravit (THA)	0
Tran Minh Duc (VIE)	5	Tran Minh Duc (VIE)	2
Donny Dharmawan (INA)	4	Donny Dharmawan (INA)	4
Thinnakone Chanthavongxay (LAO)	0			Donny Dharmawan (INA)	0
Mairul Mohammad (BRU)	2			Senthil Kumaran Silvarajoo (MAS)	0
Senthil Kumaran Silvarajoo (MAS)	4	Senthil Kumaran Silvarajoo (MAS)	3
Jayson Ramil Macaalay (PHI)	5	San Toe (MYA)	0
San Toe (MYA)	5

Bronze medal match
Thinnakone Chanthavongxay (LAO)	0
Tran Minh Duc (VIE)	8
Mairul Mohammad (BRU)	3
San Toe (MYA)	3

===== 67 kg =====
- 14 December 2013
- Legend - H Hansoku

Quarterfinal		Semifinal		Final
Tin Tun Aung (MYA)	4
Khamkay Chanthanaxay (LAO)	0	Tin Tun Aung (MYA)	0
Muhammad Fadilah Sanif (BRU)	0	Raghonathan Sharmendran (MAS)	9
Raghonathan Sharmendran (MAS)	8			Raghonathan Sharmendran (MAS)	0
Rexor Romaquin (PHI)	2			Jintar Simanjuntak (INA)	3
Nguyen Ngoc Thanh (VIE)	6	Nguyen Ngoc Thanh (VIE)	0
Jintar Simanjuntak (INA)	3	Jintar Simanjuntak (INA)	7
Supa Ngamphuengphit (THA)	1

Bronze medal match
Muhammad Fadilah Sanif (BRU)	H
Tin Tun Aung (MYA)
Supa Ngamphuengphit (THA)	6
Nguyen Ngoc Thanh (VIE)	9

===== 75 kg =====
- 14 December 2013
- Legend - H Hansoku

Quarterfinal		Semifinal		Final
Thodny Phongsamphan (LAO)	0
Aye Chan Naing (MYA)	9	Aye Chan Naing (MYA)	4
Shaharudin Jamaludin (MAS)	8	Shaharudin Jamaludin (MAS)	3
John Michael Vincent Badil (PHI)	0			Aye Chan Naing (MYA)
Mainuddin Mohamad (BRU)	1			Christo Mondolu (INA)	H
Christo Mondolu (INA)	7	Christo Mondolu (INA)	8
Nguyen Minh Phung (VIE)	0	Songvut Muntaen (THA)	2
Songvut Muntaen (THA)	2

Bronze medal match
Thodny Phongsamphan (LAO)	0
Shaharudin Jamaludin (MAS)	8
Mainuddin Mohamad (BRU)	1
Songvut Muntaen (THA)	7

===== 84 kg =====
- 14 December 2013

Quarterfinal		Semifinal		Final
Sansany Duangpanya (LAO)	0
Theerapat Kangtong (THA)	8	Theerapat Kangtong (THA)	10
Bui Nhu My (VIE)	6	Bui Nhu My (VIE)	0
Saw Kyaw Thu (MYA)	1			Theerapat Kangtong (THA)	5
Md Fazil Rewandi Md Faizal (BRU)	1			Hendro Salim (INA)	3
Engene Stoner Dagohoy (PHI)	9	Engene Stoner Dagohoy (PHI)	0
Mohd Hatta Mahamut (MAS)	0	Hendro Salim (INA)	8
Hendro Salim (INA)	2

Bronze medal match
Sansany Duangpanya (LAO)	1
Bui Nhu My (VIE)	9
Mohd Hatta Mahamut (MAS)	9
Engene Stoner Dagohoy (PHI)	1

===== +84 kg =====
- 13 December 2013

Quarterfinal
Theebaan Govindasamy (MAS)	4
Sengpheng Duangvilai (LAO)	1
Myo Thu (MYA)	0
Pham Quang Duy (VIE)	1
Sutthichai Takhieo (THA)	6
Mohammad Jamil Hj Abd Hamid (BRU)	0
BYE
Umar Syarief (INA)

Semifinal
Theebaan Govindasamy (MAS)	5
Pham Quang Duy (VIE)	0
Sutthichai Takhieo (THA)	0
Umar Syarief (INA)	8

Final
Theebaan Govindasamy (MAS)	0
Umar Syarief (INA)	1

Bronze medal match
Sengpheng Duangvilai (LAO)	1
Pham Quang Duy (VIE)	2
BYE
Sutthichai Takhieo (THA)

===== Team kumite =====
- 15 December 2013

Quarterfinal		Semifinal		Final
Brunei (BRU)	1
Thailand (THA)	3	Thailand (THA)	3
Laos (LAO)	1	Vietnam (VIE)	1
Vietnam (VIE)	3			Thailand (THA)	3
Philippines (PHI)	0			Malaysia (MAS)	1
Malaysia (MAS)	3	Malaysia (MAS)	2
Indonesia (INA)	3	Indonesia (INA)	2
Myanmar (MYA)	1

Bronze medal match
Brunei (BRU)	0
Vietnam (VIE)	3
Philippines (PHI)	1
Indonesia (INA)	3

==== Women's ====
===== 50 kg =====
- 14 December 2013

Quarterfinal
Paweena Raksachart (THA)	6
Dk Nurleha Pg Abd Rahman (BRU)	0
Vu Thi Nguyet Anh (VIE)	3
Nur Eleena Anis Ab Malik (MAS)	1
Thipphavanh Dalavanh (LAO)	0
Srunita Sari Sukatendel (INA)	8
BYE
April Phaw (MYA)

Semifinal
Paweena Raksachart (THA)	1
Vu Thi Nguyet Anh (VIE)	2
Srunita Sari Sukatendel (INA)	4
April Phaw (MYA)	2

Final
Vu Thi Nguyet Anh (VIE)	3
Srunita Sari Sukatendel (INA)	1

Bronze medal match
Nur Eleena Anis Ab Malik (MAS)	0
Paweena Raksachart (THA)	1
Thipphavanh Dalavanh (LAO)	0
April Phaw (MYA)	5

===== 55 kg =====
- 14 December 2013

Quarterfinal
Mae Soriano (PHI)	3
Tippawan Khamsi (THA)	2
Tran Hoang Yen Phuong (VIE)	3
Nurhadiyanti Fitrianingsih (INA)	0
Nisha Alagasan (MAS)	8
Win Thuzar Min (MYA)	0
BYE
Ninthida Luangrath (LAO)

Semifinal
Mae Soriano (PHI)	2
Tran Hoang Yen Phuong (VIE)	2
Nisha Alagasan (MAS)	9
Ninthida Luangrath (LAO)	0

Final
Mae Soriano (PHI)	2
Nisha Alagasan (MAS)	3

Bronze medal match
Tippawan Khamsi (THA)	8
Tran Hoang Yen Phuong (VIE)	4
Win Thuzar Min (MYA)	8
Ninthida Luangrath (LAO)	2

===== 61 kg =====
- 14 December 2013

Quarterfinal
Syakilla Salni Jefry Krisnan (MAS)	2
Arm Sukkiaw (THA)	1
BYE
Nway Nway Zaw Win (MYA)
Princess Diane Sicangco (PHI)	0
Le Thi Thuy (VIE)	3
BYE
Sanistya Rani Cok Istri Agung (INA)

Semifinal
Syakilla Salni Jefry Krisnan (MAS)	3
Nway Nway Zaw Win (MYA)	2
Le Thi Thuy (VIE)	6
Sanistya Rani Cok Istri Agung (INA)	3

Final
Syakilla Salni Jefry Krisnan (MAS)	1
Le Thi Thuy (VIE)	0

Bronze medal match
Arm Sukkiaw (THA)	0
Nway Nway Zaw Win (MYA)	8
Princess Diane Sicangco (PHI)	3
Sanistya Rani Cok Istri Agung (INA)	10

===== 68 kg =====
- 14 December 2013

Quarterfinal
Pham Thi Tien (VIE)	3
Indah Mogia Angkat (INA)	1
Cer Zung Len (MYA)	2
Phuttarat Udomset (THA)	0
Sengtavanh Bounleud (LAO)	0
Shree Sharmini Segaran (MAS)	8
BYE
Joanna Mae Ylanan (PHI)

Semifinal
Pham Thi Tien (VIE)	4
Cer Zung Len (MYA)	0
Shree Sharmini Segaran (MAS)	5
Joanna Mae Ylanan (PHI)	0

Final
Mae Soriano (PHI)	2
Shree Sharmini Segaran (MAS)	2

Bronze medal match
Indah Mogia Angkat (INA)	8
Cer Zung Len (MYA)	0
Sengtavanh Bounleud (LAO)	0
Joanna Mae Ylanan (PHI)	8

===== +68 kg =====
- 13 December 2013

Quarterfinal
Lang Thi Hoa (VIE)	3
Jamaludin Jamalliah (MAS)	2
BYE
Poe Ei Phyu (MYA)
Vannasone Donesavanh (LAO)
BYE
BYE
Pertiwi Wiwi (INA)

Semifinal
Lang Thi Hoa (VIE)	4
Poe Ei Phyu (MYA)	0
Vannasone Donesavanh (LAO)	0
Pertiwi Wiwi (INA)	2

Final
Lang Thi Hoa (VIE)	8
Pertiwi Wiwi (INA)	0

Bronze medal match
Jamaludin Jamalliah (MAS)	6
Poe Ei Phyu (MYA)	0
BYE
Vannasone Donesavanh (LAO)

===== Team kumite =====
- 15 December 2013

Quarterfinal
Thailand (THA)	1
Indonesia (INA)	2
Myanmar (MYA)	2
Philippines (PHI)	0
Vietnam (VIE)	2
Laos (LAO)	0
BYE
Malaysia (MAS)

Semifinal
Indonesia (INA)	2
Myanmar (MYA)	1
Vietnam (VIE)	0
Malaysia (MAS)	1

Final
Indonesia (INA)	0
Malaysia (MAS)	2

Bronze medal match
Thailand (THA)	0
Myanmar (MYA)	1
BYE
Vietnam (VIE)
