= Brunei at the 2013 SEA Games =

Brunei at the 2013 Southeast Asian Games
- IOC code: BRU
- NOC: Brunei Darussalam National Olympic Council
- Website: www.bruneiolympic.org (in English)

in Naypyidaw
- Medals Ranked 11th: Gold 1 Silver 1 Bronze 6 Total 8

Southeast Asian Games appearances (overview)
- 1977; 1979; 1981; 1983; 1985; 1987; 1989; 1991; 1993; 1995; 1997; 1999; 2001; 2003; 2005; 2007; 2009; 2011; 2013; 2015; 2017; 2019; 2021; 2023; 2025; 2027; 2029

Brunei competed in the 2013 Southeast Asian Games in Myanmar from 11 to 22 December 2013

== Competitors ==
| Sport | Men | Women | Total |
|---|---|---|---|
| Athletics | 2 | 1 | 3 |
| Billiards and snooker | 1 | 0 | 1 |
| Cycling | 5 | 0 | 5 |
| Football | 31 | 0 | 31 |
| Karate | 7 | 1 | 8 |
| Pencak silat | 5 | 3 | 8 |
| Pétanque | 3 | 0 | 3 |
| Sepak takraw | 6 | 0 | 6 |
| Taekwondo | 1 | 1 | 2 |
| Wushu | 2 | 3 | 5 |
| Total | 63 | 9 | 72 |

== Medal summary ==
=== Medal by sport ===
Medals by sport
| Sport | 1st place, gold medalist(s) | 2nd place, silver medalist(s) | 3rd place, bronze medalist(s) | Total |
|---|---|---|---|---|
| Karate | 0 | 1 | 1 | 2 |
| Pencak silat | 0 | 0 | 2 | 2 |
| Taekwondo | 0 | 0 | 1 | 1 |
| Sepak takraw | 0 | 0 | 2 | 2 |
| Wushu | 1 | 0 | 0 | 1 |
| Total | 1 | 1 | 6 | 8 |

=== Medalists ===
| Medal | Name | Sport | Event |
|---|---|---|---|
| Gold | Faustina Woo Wai Sii; Lee Ying Shi | Wushu | Women's taolu duilian (2 or 3 athletes Bare Hands) |
| Silver | Muhammad Fada'iy Sanif | Karate | Men's individual kumite 55kg |
| Bronze | Mairul Mohammad | Karate | Men's individual kumite 60kg |
| Bronze | Abdul Malik Ladi; Awang Abd Rahman; Juffri Haji Junaidi | Pencak silat | Men's team artistic |
| Bronze | Ak Mohd Khairul Bahri Pg Aliumar | Pencak silat | Men's 75-80kg |
| Bronze | Ismail Ang; Humaidi Brahim; Mohammad Shukri Jainen; Moh Hafizzuddin Jamaludin; Abdul Hadi Ariffin Matali; Marzuki Munap | Sepak takraw | Men's double team |
| Bronze | Ismail Ang; Humaidi Brahim; Mohammad Shukri Jainen; Moh Hafizzuddin Jamaludin; Abdul Hadi Ariffin Matali; Marzuki Munap | Sepak takraw | Men's hoop takraw |
| Bronze | Nurulain Md Ja'afar | Taekwondo | Women's 67–73 kg |
