= Judo at the 2013 SEA Games =

Judo competition

- Venue: Zayyarthiri Indoor Stadium
- Dates: 18–21 December 2013

Judo at the 2013 SEA Games took place at Zayyarthiri Indoor Stadium, Naypyidaw, Myanmar between December 18–21.

== Medalists ==
=== Kata ===
Event	Gold	Silver	Bronze
Men's Nage No Kata	Thailand; Pongthep Tumronluk; Sangob Sasipongpan	Vietnam; Nguyễn Ngọc Sơn; Nguyễn Thành Tài	Myanmar; Chit Min Min Ko; Phyo Ko Ko
Women's Ju-No Kata	Thailand; Chuthathip Bampenboon; Pitima Thaweerattanasinp	Vietnam; Nguyễn Hoàng Cẩm Hà; Lê Ngọc Vân Anh	Myanmar; Khin Khin Su; Yin Thu Aye

=== Men ===
Event	Gold	Silver	Bronze
55 kg	Huỳnh Nhất Thống; Vietnam	Kap Cin Pau; Myanmar	Muhamad Jafaannuar Jamaludin; Malaysia
55 kg	Huỳnh Nhất Thống; Vietnam	Kap Cin Pau; Myanmar	Soukphaxyay Sithisane; Laos
60 kg	Hồ Ngân Giang; Vietnam	Hein Latt Zaw; Myanmar	Sahachai Chatchawan; Thailand
60 kg	Hồ Ngân Giang; Vietnam	Hein Latt Zaw; Myanmar	Bryn Quillotes; Philippines
66 kg	Amornthep Namwiset; Thailand	Nguyễn Đình Lộc; Vietnam	Mochammad Syaiful Raharjo; Indonesia
66 kg	Amornthep Namwiset; Thailand	Nguyễn Đình Lộc; Vietnam	Soukthalong Sikhot; Laos
73 kg	Gilbert Ramirez; Philippines	Iksan Apriyadi; Indonesia	Banpot Lertthaisong; Thailand
73 kg	Gilbert Ramirez; Philippines	Iksan Apriyadi; Indonesia	Zaw Naing; Myanmar
81 kg	Nopachai Kocharat; Thailand	Gary Chow Weng Luen; Singapore	Tô Hải Long; Vietnam
81 kg	Nopachai Kocharat; Thailand	Gary Chow Weng Luen; Singapore	Putu Wiradamungga Adesta; Indonesia
90 kg	Zin Linn Aung; Myanmar	Horas Manurung; Indonesia	Angelo Gabriel Gumila; Philippines
90 kg	Zin Linn Aung; Myanmar	Horas Manurung; Indonesia	Gabriel Yang Yi; Singapore
100 kg	Yan Naing Soe; Myanmar	Đặng Hào; Vietnam	Adwin Sumantri; Indonesia
100 kg	Yan Naing Soe; Myanmar	Đặng Hào; Vietnam	Timothy Loh; Singapore
+100 kg	Han Boon Ho; Singapore	Saknarin Kaewpakdee; Thailand	Muhammad Ruzaini Abdul Razak; Malaysia

=== Women ===
Event	Gold	Silver	Bronze
45 kg	Sel Wee; Myanmar	Nancy Lucero; Philippines	Tri Kusumawardani Susanti; Indonesia
45 kg	Sel Wee; Myanmar	Nancy Lucero; Philippines	Orn Areeya Konngoen; Thailand
48 kg	Văn Ngọc Tú; Vietnam	Helen Dawa; Philippines	Dewinda Ariani Trisna; Indonesia
48 kg	Văn Ngọc Tú; Vietnam	Helen Dawa; Philippines	Phetnida Sy Amphoen; Laos
52 kg	Phonenaly Sayarath; Laos	Nguyễn Thị Quỳnh; Vietnam	Noor Maizura Zainon; Malaysia
52 kg	Phonenaly Sayarath; Laos	Nguyễn Thị Quỳnh; Vietnam	Ismayasari; Indonesia
57 kg	Om Pongchaliew; Thailand	Jenielou Mosqueda; Philippines	Hồ Thị Như Vân; Vietnam
57 kg	Om Pongchaliew; Thailand	Jenielou Mosqueda; Philippines	Ni Kadek Anny Pandini; Indonesia
63 kg	Kiyomi Watanabe; Philippines	Bùi Thị Hòa; Vietnam	Nik Norbaizura Nik Azman; Malaysia
63 kg	Kiyomi Watanabe; Philippines	Bùi Thị Hòa; Vietnam	Orapin Senatham; Thailand
70 kg	Surattana Thongsri; Thailand	Thandar Win; Myanmar	Tiara Arta Garthia; Indonesia
78 kg	Aye Aye Aung; Myanmar	Nguyễn Thị Như Ý Vietnam	Nor Izzatul Fazlia Mohamad Tahir; Malaysia
78 kg	Aye Aye Aung; Myanmar	Nguyễn Thị Như Ý Vietnam	Desi Yudiyanti; Indonesia
+78 kg	Thonthan Satjadet; Thailand	Khin Myo Thu; Myanmar	Trần Thúy Duy; Vietnam
+78 kg	Thonthan Satjadet; Thailand	Khin Myo Thu; Myanmar	Noor Asnida Abd Razak; Malaysia

== Medal table ==
* Host nation (Myanmar)

Rank	Nation	Gold	Silver	Bronze	Total
1	Thailand	7	1	4	12
2	Myanmar*	4	4	3	11
3	Vietnam	3	7	3	13
4	Philippines	2	3	2	7
5	Singapore	1	1	2	4
6	Laos	1	0	3	4
7	Indonesia	0	2	9	11
8	Malaysia	0	0	6	6
Totals (8 entries)		18	18	32	68

== Controversy ==
Indonesian Judo team refuses one silver and two bronze medals awarded to them as a protest of alleged referee unfairness in Judo 90 kg final match between Horas Manurung from Indonesia against Myanmar athlete Zin Linn Aung in Zeyar Thiri Indoor Stadium, Naypyitaw, Myanmar, Saturday, 21 December 2013. According to Indonesian team Judo coach, Tsuneo Sengoku, the referee should stop the match when the host athlete Zin Linn Aung locked Manurung's shoulder in illegal foul moves, but the referee decide to continue the match resulting in the defeat and injury of Indonesian athlete. The locking movement in Judo are allowed on hand and arms parts, but not allowed on upper arm and shoulder as it could cause injuries.
