= Philippines at the 2013 SEA Games =

Philippines at the 2013 Southeast Asian Games
- IOC code: PHI
- NOC: Philippine Olympic Committee
- Website: www.olympic.ph (in English)

in Naypyidaw
- Competitors: 210
- Flag bearer: Jason Balabal (wrestling)
- Medals Ranked 7th: Gold 29 Silver 34 Bronze 38 Total 101

Southeast Asian Games appearances (overview)
- 1977; 1979; 1981; 1983; 1985; 1987; 1989; 1991; 1993; 1995; 1997; 1999; 2001; 2003; 2005; 2007; 2009; 2011; 2013; 2015; 2017; 2019; 2021; 2023; 2025; 2027; 2029

The Philippines competed at the 27th Southeast Asian Games held in Naypyidaw, the capital of Myanmar, as well as in two other main cities, Yangon and Mandalay. from 11 to 22 December 2013.

== Preparation ==
According to Richie Garcia, the chairman of the Philippine Sports Commission (PSC), the 2013 SEA games has to give more attention due to criticism of the country's delegation to the London Olympic Games which was allegedly influenced by the “Have money, will travel,” scheme. Composed of about 148 athletes, the Philippines' delegation to the SEA games includes a former medalist of SEA games in Palembang Indonesia.

After the exclusion of Olympic sports, the inclusion of indigenous sports such as vovinam, kempo and chinlone and the number of gold medals allotted was increased on sports where the host Myanmar deemed to have better chances of winning like dragon boat, the Philippines has decided to send a "token delegation" to Myanmar.

The Philippine Olympic Committee, has set criteria to determine which athletes would be sent to the games. The committee used a gold medal criteria in its selection process. The committee insists that funding would not boost one team's bid to be included in the country's official delegation to the games. The Philippine Olympic Committee and Philippine Sports Commission did not gave the greenlight for the participation of the country's national u-23 football team due to “lack of international friendlies” base their qualifications on, drawing criticism. The women's football team was allowed to participate in the tournament.

== Expectations ==
Philippine Sports Commission chairman Richie Garcia expects the country to win at least 25 medals. The country's top officials sees a number of sports such as athletics, boxing, sailing, weightlifting and wushu as potential sources for gold. Despite the low number of delegation the country has seen in years, Philippine Olympic Committee chairman Jose Cojuangco, expects the same finish for the country's representatives. He refuted criticisms on the number of delegates and insists that it is about the quality of athletes and not the number of athletes being sent to the games.

== Broadcasting ==
ABS-CBN was named the sole official broadcaster of the games in the Philippines, after the successful broadcast. But due to the expensive and non-free TV rights coming from Myanmar (The previous edition of the Games TV rights were free), the network only decided to air Basketball Men's and Football Women's on a delayed basis. Other events including the Ceremonies were not aired. Studio 23 aired the games, which eventually closed down a month after and also one probable cause to free all airtime in the channel before shutting down.

== Medalists ==
=== Gold ===
No.	Medal	Name	Sport	Event
1	Gold	Earl Yap; Dean Adriano; Ian Chipeco	Archery	Men's team compound
2	Gold	Henry Dagmil	Athletics	Men's long jump
3	Gold	Arnand Christian Bagsit	Athletics	Men's 400m
4	Gold	Eric Cray	Athletics	Men's 400M Hurdles
5	Gold	Christopher Ulboc	Athletics	Men's 3000m Steeplechase
6	Gold	Jeeson Ramil Cid	Athletics	Men's Decathlon
7	Gold	Isidro Del Prado Jr. Edgardo Alejan Jr. Julius Felicisimo Nierras; Archand Christian Bagsit	Athletics	Men's 4 × 400 m Relay
8	Gold	Kevin Alas; Matthew Ganuelas; Ronald Pascual; Bobby Ray Parks Jr. Jericho Cruz; Mac Belo; Marcus Douthit; Roi Sumang; Garvo Lanete; Kevin Ferrer; Kiefer Ravena	Basketball	Men's team
9	Gold	Dennis Orcollo	Billiards	Men's 10-Ball Pool Singles
10	Gold	Rubilen Amit	Billiards	Women's 10-Ball Pool Singles
11	Gold	Josie Gabuco	Boxing	Women's 45–48kg
12	Gold	Mark Anthony Barriga	Boxing	Men's 48kg
13	Gold	Mario Fernandez	Boxing	Men's 56kg
14	Gold	Mark Lester Galedo	Cycling	Men's 50km Individual Time Trial
15	Gold	Daniel Caluag	Cycling	Men's BMX
16	Gold	Princess Superal	Golf	Women's individual
17	Gold	Princess Superal; Miya Legaspi; Kat Briones	Golf	Women's team
18	Gold	Gilbert Ramirez	Judo	Men's 73kg
19	Gold	Kiyomi Watanabe	Judo	Women's 63kg
20	Gold	Ramon Antonio Franco	Karate	Men's Kumite 55kg
21	Gold	Preciosa Ocaya	Muay Thai	Women's 54kg
22	Gold	Nestor Cordova	Rowing	Men's Singles Sculls
23	Gold	Dustin Jacob Mella; Raphael Enrico Mella; Vidal Marvin Gabriel	Taekwondo	Men's team poomsae
24	Gold	Jade Zafra	Taekwondo	Women's gyeorugi 57 kg
25	Gold	Kristopher Robert Uy	Taekwondo	Men's gyeorugi +87 kg
26	Gold	Kirstie Elaine Alora	Taekwondo	Women's gyeorugi +73 kg
27	Gold	Jessie Aligaga	Wushu	Men's Sanshou 48kg
28	Gold	Denbert Arcita	Wushu	Men's Sanshou 52kg
29	Gold	Daniel Parantac	Wushu	Men's taolu Taijiquan/Taijijian

=== Silver ===
No.	Medal	Name	Sport	Event
1	Silver	Edgardo Alejan Jr.	Athletics	Men's 400m
2	Silver	Mervin Guarte	Athletics	Men's 800m
3	Silver	Arniel Ferrera	Athletics	Men's hammer throw
4	Silver	Narcisa Atienza	Athletics	Women's Heptathlon
5	Silver	Joan Grajales; Chovi Borja; Merenciana Arayi; Camille Sambile; Melissa Jacob; Bernadette Mercado; Angeli Gloriani; Cindy Resultay; Cassandra Tioseco; Analyn Almazan; Denise Tiu	Basketball	Women's team
6	Silver	Carlo Biado	Billiards	Men's 10-ball Pool Singles
7	Silver	Rubilen Amit	Billiards	Women's 9-ball Pool Singles
8	Silver	Junel Cantancio	Boxing	Men's 60kg
9	Silver	Dennis Galvan	Boxing	Men's 64kg
10	Silver	Wilfredo Lopez	Boxing	Men's 75kg
11	Silver	Nesthy Petecio	Boxing	Women's 57kg
12	Silver	John Paul Gomez	Chess	Men's 960 Rapid
13	Silver	Darwin Laylo; Eugene Torre; Rogelio Antonio Jr. John Paul Gomez	Chess	Men's ASEAN Rapid Team
14	Silver	Christopher John Caluag	Cycling	Men's BMX
15	Silver	Nancy Lucero	Judo	Women's 45kg
16	Silver	Helen Dawa	Judo	Women's 48kg
17	Silver	Jenielou Mosqueda	Judo	Women's 57kg
18	Silver	Mae Soriano	Karate	Women's kumite 55kg
19	Silver	Phillip Delarmino	Muay Thai	Men's 54kg
20	Silver	Jonathan Polosan	Muay Thai	Men's 63.5kg
21	Silver	Benjamin Tolentino; Edgar Ilas	Rowing	Men's double sculls
22	Silver	Roque Abala; Alvin Amposta	Rowing	Men's lightweight double sculls
23	Silver	Richly Magsanai; Ridgely Balladares	Sailing	Men's international 470
24	Silver	Geylord Coveta	Sailing	Men's Open RS:X
25	Silver	Marvin Gabriel Vidal	Taekwondo	Men's Single Poomsae
26	Silver	Francis Aaron Agojo	Taekwondo	Men's gyeorugi 54 kg
27	Silver	Samuel Morrison	Taekwondo	Men's gyeorugi 74 kg
28	Silver	Christianal Dela Cruz	Taekwondo	Men's gyeorugi 80 kg
29	Silver	Hidilyn Diaz	Weightlifting	Women's 58kg
30	Silver	Margarito Angana Jr.	Wrestling	Men's Greco-Roman 55kg
31	Silver	Jason Balabal	Wrestling	Men's Greco-Roman 84kg
32	Silver	Daniel Parantac; John Kiethly Chan; Norlence Catolico	Wushu	Men's taolu Weapons Duilian Team
33	Silver	Divine Wally	Wushu	Women's Sanshou 48kg
34	Silver	Evita Elise Zamora	Wushu	Women's Shanshou 52kg

=== Bronze ===
No.	Medal	Name	Sport	Event
1	Bronze	Earl Benjamin Yap	Archery	Men's individual compound
2	Bronze	Eric Panique	Athletics	Men's Marathon
3	Bronze	Jessica Barnard	Athletics	Women's 3000m Steeplechase
4	Bronze	Riezel Buenaventura	Athletics	Women's pole vault
5	Bronze	Iris Ranola	Billiards	Women's 10-ball Pool Singles
6	Bronze	Francisco Dela Cruz	Billiards	Men's Carom 1 Cushion Singles
7	Bronze	Efren Reyes	Billiards	Men's Carom 1 Cushion Singles
8	Bronze	Rey Saludar	Boxing	Men's 52kg
9	Bronze	Maricris Igram	Boxing	Women's 51kg
10	Bronze	Irish Magno	Boxing	Women's 54kg
11	Bronze	Hermie Macaranas	Canoeing	Men's C1 1000m
12	Bronze	John Paul Gomez	Chess	Men's international Rapid
13	Bronze	Rogelio Antonio Jr.	Chess	Men's international Blitz
14	Bronze	Ronald Oranza	Cycling	Men's 50km Individual Time Trial
15	Bronze	Ronald Oranza; Mark John Galedo; Rustom C Lim	Cycling	Men's 163km team Road Race
16	Bronze	Bryn Quillotes	Judo	Men's 60kg
17	Bronze	Angelo Gabriel Gumila	Judo	Men's 90kg
18	Bronze	Joanna Mae Ylanan	Karate	Women's kumite 68kg
19	Bronze	Nerlyn Huinda	Pencak Silat	Women's 55–60kg
20	Bronze	Clyde Joy Baria	Pencak Silat	Women's 70–75kg
21	Bronze	Emmanuel Escote; Jason Huerte; Rhey Jey Ortouste	Sepak Takraw	Men's Double Regu
22	Bronze	Joshua Hall	Swimming	Men's 100m breaststroke
23	Bronze	Matt Louis Navata	Swimming	Men's 200m butterfly
24	Bronze	Jasmine Al-Khaldi	Swimming	Women's 100m freestyle
25	Bronze	Jasmine Al-Khaldi	Swimming	Women's 100m butterfly
26	Bronze	Richard Gonzales	Table Tennis	Men's singles
27	Bronze	Ma. Carla Janice Lagman; Rani Ortega; Rinna Babanto	Taekwondo	Women's team poomsae
28	Bronze	Paul Romero	Taekwondo	Men's gyeorugi 63 kg
29	Bronze	Gershon Bautista	Taekwondo	Men's gyeorugi 68 kg
30	Bronze	Mary Anjelay Pelaez	Taekwondo	Women's gyeorugi 46 kg
31	Bronze	Pauline Louise Lopez	Taekwondo	Women's gyeorugi 53 kg
32	Bronze	Jane Rafaelle Narra	Taekwondo	Women's gyeorugi 73 kg
33	Bronze	Alvin Lobrequito	Wrestling	Men's freestyle 55kg
34	Bronze	Jhonny Morte	Wrestling	Men's freestyle 60kg
35	Bronze	Joseph Angana	Wrestling	Men's freestyle 66kg
36	Bronze	Jason Balabal	Wrestling	Men's freestyle 84kg
37	Bronze	Francisco Solis	Wushu	Men's Sanshou 56kg
38	Bronze	Kariza Kris Chan; Nastasha Enriquez	Wushu	Women's taolu Barehand Duilian

== Medal summary ==
=== By sports ===
Rank	Sport	Gold	Silver	Bronze	Total
1	Athletics	6	4	3	13
2	Taekwondo	4	4	6	14
3	Boxing	3	4	3	10
4	Wushu	3	3	2	8
5	Judo	2	3	2	7
6	Billiards and snooker	2	2	3	7
7	Cycling	2	1	2	5
8	Golf	2	0	0	2
9	Muay	1	2	0	3
9	Rowing	1	2	0	3
11	Karatedo	1	1	1	3
12	Basketball	1	1	0	2
13	Archery	1	0	1	2
14	Wrestling	0	2	4	6
15	Chess	0	2	2	4
16	Sailing	0	2	0	2
17	Weightlifting	0	1	0	1
18	Swimming	0	0	4	4
19	Pencak silat	0	0	2	2
20	Canoeing	0	0	1	1
20	Sepak takraw	0	0	1	1
20	Table Tennis	0	0	1	1
Totals (22 entries)		29	34	38	101
