= Indonesia at the 2013 SEA Games =

Indonesia at the 2013 Southeast Asian Games
- IOC code: INA
- NOC: Indonesian Olympic Committee
- Website: www.nocindonesia.or.id (in English)

in Naypyidaw 11 - 22 December 2013
- Competitors: 621 in 26 sports
- Flag bearer: Suryo Agung Wibowo (athletics)
- Officials: 221
- Medals Ranked 4th: Gold 65 Silver 84 Bronze 111 Total 260

Southeast Asian Games appearances (overview)
- 1977; 1979; 1981; 1983; 1985; 1987; 1989; 1991; 1993; 1995; 1997; 1999; 2001; 2003; 2005; 2007; 2009; 2011; 2013; 2015; 2017; 2019; 2021; 2023; 2025; 2027; 2029

Indonesia competed at the 2013 Southeast Asian Games. The 27th Southeast Asian Games took place in Naypyidaw, the capital of Myanmar, as well as in two other main cities, Yangon and Mandalay.

== Medalists ==
Medal	Name	Sport	Event	Date
Gold	Achmad Hulaefi	Wushu	Men's gunshu	08 Dec
Gold	Lindswell	Wushu	Women's taijiquan + taijijian	08 Dec
Gold	Achmad Hulaefi	Wushu	Men's daoshu	09 Dec
Gold	Juwita Niza Wasni	Wushu	Women's nangun	09 Dec
Gold	Kusno Hadi Saputra	Wrestling	Men's Greco-Roman -74 kg	10 Dec
Gold	Anwar Tarra; Eka Octarorianus	Canoeing	Men's C2 500m	12 Dec
Gold	Erni Sokoy	Canoeing	Women's K1 500m	12 Dec
Gold	Kusmawati Yazid; Chandra Rafsanzani; Wilhelmina Tutuarima; Bandi Sugito	Cycling	Mixed cross country relay	12 Dec
Gold	Ricky Anggawijaya	Swimming	Men's 200m backstroke	12 Dec
Gold	Spensstuber Mehue	Canoeing	Men's C1 500m	13 Dec
Gold	Erni Sokoy	Canoeing	Women's K1 200m	13 Dec
Gold	Kusumawati Yazid	Cycling	Women's cross country	13 Dec
Gold	Erwin Yoga; Valentino Lumentah; Alvaro Menayang; Ferry Wahyu Hadiyanto	Equestrian	Dressage team	13 Dec
Gold	Umar Syarief	Karate	Men's kumite +84 kg	13 Dec
Gold	Gusti Ngurah Arya Yuda	Pencak Silat	Men's artistic single	13 Dec
Gold	Muhsin Anwar Tahir; Lisman; I Made Alex Dwi Putra	Pencak Silat	Men's artistic team	13 Dec
Gold	Dewa Ayu Ari Pratiwi	Pencak Silat	Women's artistic single	13 Dec
Gold	Triady Fauzi Sidiq	Swimming	Men's 100m freestyle	13 Dec
Gold	Fahrjansyah	Wrestling	Men's freestyle -84 kg	13 Dec
Gold	Eko Yuli Irawan	Weightlifting	Men's -62 kg	13 Dec
Gold	Sri Wahyuni Agustiani	Weightlifting	Women's -48 kg	13 Dec
Gold	Angga Pratama; Rian Agung Saputro	Badminton	Men's doubles	14 Dec
Gold	Muhammad Rijal; Debby Susanto	Badminton	Mixed doubles	14 Dec
Gold	Bellaetrix Manuputty	Badminton	Women's singles	14 Dec
Gold	Angeline M. Ticoalu	Billiards and Snooker	Women's 9 ball pool singles	14 Dec
Gold	Irine Kharisma Sukandar	Chess	Women's international individual blitz	14 Dec
Gold	Hildan Afosma	Cycling	Men's downhill	14 Dec
Gold	Jintar Simanjuntak	Karate	Men's kumite -67 kg	14 Dec
Gold	I Gede Siman Sudartawa	Swimming	Men's 100m backstroke	14 Dec
Gold	Deni	Weightlifting	Men's -69 kg	14 Dec
Gold	Hendro	Athletics	Men's 20 km walk	15 Dec
Gold	Mohamad Rusdin	Pencak Silat	Men's -60 kg	15 Dec
Gold	Triady Fauzi Sidiq	Swimming	Men's 50m freestyle	15 Dec
Gold	Ricky Yang	Billiards and Snooker	Men's 9 ball pool singles	16 Dec
Gold	Susanto Megaranto	Chess	Men's 960 individual rapid	16 Dec
Gold	Muhad Yakin; Ihram	Rowing	Men's double sculls	16 Dec
Gold	Jamaluddin; Mochamad Alidar; Arief; Thomas Hallatu	Rowing	Men's lightweight coxless four	16 Dec
Gold	I Gede Siman Sudartawa; Indra Gunawan; Glenn Victor Sutanto; Triady Fauzi Sidiq	Swimming	Men's 4 × 100 m medley relay	16 Dec
Gold	Wahyuni; Maryam Daimoi	Rowing	Women's double sculls	16 Dec
Gold	Sri Ranti; Rona Riska Sari; Dellie Threesyadinda	Archery	Women's compound Team	17 Dec
Gold	Titik Kusumawardani; Ika Yuliana Rochmawati; Diananda Choirunisa	Archery	Women's recurve team	17 Dec
Gold	Maria Londa	Athletics	Women's triple jump	17 Dec
Gold	Irine Kharisma Sukandar	Chess	Women's international Individual Rapid	17 Dec
Gold	Jendry Palandeng; Andry Prasetyono; Pingkan Motria; Asep Lesmana	Equestrian	Show jumping team	17 Dec
Gold	Yules Pulu Umbu	Kempo	Men's -65 kg	17 Dec
Gold	Jamaluddin; Iswandi; Agus Budi Aji; Anang Mulyana; Edwin Ginanjar; Mochamad Alidar; Muhad Yakin; Ihram; Jarudin	Rowing	Men's Coxed Eight	17 Dec
Gold	Arief; Thomas Hallatu	Rowing	Men's lightweight double sculls	17 Dec
Gold	Rini Budiarti	Athletics	Women's 3000m Steeplechase	18 Dec
Gold	Maria Londa	Athletics	Women's Long Jump	18 Dec
Gold	Muhammad Lutfi Ali; Susanto Megaranto	Chess	Men's pair transfer blitz	18 Dec
Gold	Robin Manullang; Aiman Cahyadi; Bambang Suryadi	Cycling	Men's 163 km team	18 Dec
Gold	Christin Mery Rajagukguk	Kempo	Women's -57 kg	18 Dec
Gold	Dedeh Erawati	Athletics	Women's 100m hurdles	19 Dec
Gold	Triyaningsih	Athletics	Women's 10000m	19 Dec
Gold	Elga Kharisma Novanda	Cycling	Women's BMX	19 Dec
Gold	Men's team	Traditional Boat Race	Men's 20 crew 500m	19 Dec
Gold	Muhammad Lutfi Ali; Chelsie Monica Sihite	Chess	Mixed pair transfer blitz	20 Dec
Gold	Carli Matatar; Erik Syahputra; Haggis Avdallah; Jems Adi Pah; Muhamad Sarangan; Pratama Prihandoko; Rifki Thohir; Rohmat	Kempo	Men's dantai embu group 8 kenshi	20 Dec
Gold	Ade Irma; Deri Fitri; Lisma Nasution; Novia Lusiyanti; Orva Trifena; Rahmiyanti; Soraya Zen; Susi Susanti	Kempo	Women's dantai embu group 8 kenshi	20 Dec
Gold	Mixed Team	Traditional Boat Race	Mixed 20 crew 500m	20 Dec
Gold	I Gusti Agung Gede Ary Wirawan; I Wayan Sumertayasa; I Nyoman Suryawan; Dewa Gede Tomi Sanjaya	Vovinam	Men's Da Luyen Vu Khi Nam	20 Dec
Gold	Luh Gede Arista Dewi; Ni Made Dwi Ratna	Vovinam	Women's song luyen kiem	20 Dec
Gold	Almadi	Kempo	Men's -55 kg	21 Dec
Gold	David Sulaeman; Panji Gaza Ragabangsa	Kempo	Men's kumi embu pair yudansha	21 Dec
Gold	Anna Yunita Gelu	Kempo	Women's -51 kg	21 Dec
Silver	Achmad Hulaefi	Wushu	Men's Changquan	07 Dec
Silver	Rustang	Wrestling	Men's Greco-Roman -66 kg	09 Dec
Silver	Ivana Ardelia Irmanto	Wushu	Women's nangun	09 Dec
Silver	Dasmantua Simbolon	Wushu	Men's 48 kg	09 Dec
Silver	Spensstuber Mehue	Canoeing	Men's C1 1000m	10 Dec
Silver	Anwar Tarra; Eka Octarorianus	Canoeing	Men's C2 1000m	10 Dec
Silver	Gandie; Maizir Riyondra; Muchlis; Silo	Canoeing	Men's K4 1000m	10 Dec
Silver	Zuliansyah; Beby Willy Tarigan; Delvin Felliciano; Sylvester Manik; Andi Muhammad; Benny Respati; Soederman Prayogo; Reza Auditya Putra; Brandley Legawa; Ridjkie Mulia; Zaenal Arifin; Novendra Deni; Novian Dwi Putra	Water Polo	Men's team	10 Dec
Silver	Yusnar Yusuf	Equestrian	Endurance	11 Dec
Silver	Yulanda Ester Enthong; Kanti Santyawati; Sincelithasova Yom; Erni Sokoy	Canoeing	Women's K4 500m	12 Dec
Silver	I Gede Siman Sudartawa	Swimming	Men's 200m backstroke	12 Dec
Silver	Yessy Yosaputra	Swimming	Women's 200m backstroke	12 Dec
Silver	Raina Saumi Ramdhani; Kathriana Gustianjani; Patricia Yosita Hapsari; Ressa Kania Dewi	Swimming	Women's 4 × 200 m freestyle relay	12 Dec
Silver	Eko Roni Saputra	Wrestling	Men's freestyle -55 kg	12 Dec
Silver	Muhammad Iqbal	Wrestling	Men's freestyle -60 kg	12 Dec
Silver	Ricky Fajar Saputra	Wrestling	Men's freestyle -66 kg	12 Dec
Silver	Heka Maya Sari	Wrestling	Women's freestyle -51 kg	12 Dec
Silver	Spensstuber Mehue	Canoeing	Men's C1 200m	13 Dec
Silver	Dewi Ardhiani Citra; Nadya Anggraini Mukmin; Chelsie Monica Sihite; Dita Karenza	Chess	Women's traditional team rapid	13 Dec
Silver	Bandi Sugito	Cycling	Men's cross country	13 Dec
Silver	Yulianti Syafrudin	Karate	Women's kata individual	13 Dec
Silver	Pertiwi Wiwi	Karate	Women's kumite +68 kg	13 Dec
Silver	Eka Prasetya Viktor; Hadi Samsul; Nofrisal; Nur Adil Saiyed; Pago Hendra; Purnomo Yudi; Rijal Saiful; Sihab Abrian; Uba Husni	Sepaktakraw	Men's team	13 Dec
Silver	Indra Gunawan	Swimming	Men's 100m breaststroke	13 Dec
Silver	Jadi Setiadi	Weightlifting	Men's -56 kg	13 Dec
Silver	Berry Angriawan; Ricky Karanda Suwandi	Badminton	Men's doubles	14 Dec
Silver	Dionysius Hayom Rumbaka	Badminton	Men's singles	14 Dec
Silver	Nitya Maheswari; Greysia Polii	Badminton	Women's doubles	14 Dec
Silver	Konelis Kwangu Langu	Boxing	Men's -49 kg	14 Dec
Silver	Kristianus	Boxing	Men's -81 kg	14 Dec
Silver	Beatrix Suguro	Boxing	Women's -48 kg	14 Dec
Silver	Ester Kalayuk	Boxing	Women's -54 kg	14 Dec
Silver	Purnomo	Cycling	Men's downhill	14 Dec
Silver	Risa Suseanty	Cycling	Women's downhill	14 Dec
Silver	Valentino Lumentah	Equestrian	Dressage	14 Dec
Silver	Donny Dharmawan	Karate	Men's kumite -60 kg	14 Dec
Silver	Christo Mondolu	Karate	Men's kumite -75 kg	14 Dec
Silver	Hendro Salim	Karate	Men's kumite -84 kg	14 Dec
Silver	Srunita Sari Sukatendel	Karate	Women's kumite -50 kg	14 Dec
Silver	Triady Fauzi Sidiq	Swimming	Men's 100m butterfly	14 Dec
Silver	Robin Manullang	Cycling	Men's 50 km Individual Time Trial	15 Dec
Silver	Intan Nurjanah; Srunita Sari Sukatendel; Sanistya Rani Agung; Indah Mogia Angkat	Karate	Women's kumite Team	15 Dec
Silver	Awaluddin Nur	Pencak Silat	Men's -50 kg	15 Dec
Silver	I Nyoman Ardika Saputrawan	Pencak Silat	Men's -85 kg	15 Dec
Silver	Wewey Wita	Pencak Silat	Women's -60 kg	15 Dec
Silver	Mariati	Pencak Silat	Women's -75 kg	15 Dec
Silver	Sinta Darmariani	Weightlifting	Women's -63 kg	15 Dec
Silver	Dellie Threesyadinda	Archery	Women's compound Individual	16 Dec
Silver	Titik Kusumawardani	Archery	Women's recurve Individual	16 Dec
Silver	Mohamad Ervan; Taufik Halay; Dede Lioe	Chess	Men's traditional team blitz	16 Dec
Silver	Ressa Kania Dewi	Swimming	Women's 400m individual medley	16 Dec
Silver	Iswandi	Athletics	Men's 100m	17 Dec
Silver	Andrian	Athletics	Men's 400m hurdles	17 Dec
Silver	Triyaningsih	Athletics	Women's 5000m	17 Dec
Silver	Erik Syahputra; Haggis Mugara; Marcel Renhard Pah; Suntono	Kempo	Men's dantai embu group 4 kenshi	17 Dec
Silver	Maryam Daimoi	Rowing	Women's single sculls	17 Dec
Silver	Zakaria Malik	Athletics	Men's Decathlon	18 Dec
Silver	Adinda Putri Sofyan; Anastasia Brenda Mbura	Kempo	Women's kumi embu pair kyu kenshi	18 Dec
Silver	Men's team	Traditional Boat Race	Men's 10 crew 1000m	18 Dec
Silver	Maulana Hadir; Muhammad Fazza; Muhammad Abdurrahman	Taekwondo	Men's poomsae team	18 Dec
Silver	Men's team	Traditional Boat Race	Women's 20 crew 500m	19 Dec
Silver	I Putu Aris Sanjaya; Dewa Made Juni Artana; I Kadek Mogi Bahana Lenge; I Putu Agus Ardiana	Vovinam	Men's Don Chan Tan Cong	19 Dec
Silver	Angeline M. Ticoalu	Billiards and Snooker	Women's 10 Ball Pool Singles	20 Dec
Silver	Eka Purnama Indah; Dewi Setyaningsih	Diving	Women's 3m springboard Synchronized	20 Dec
Silver	Iksan Apriyadi	Judo	Men's -73 kg	20 Dec
Silver	Anggi Prasetia; Muhammad Iqbal	Kempo	Men's Kumi Embu Pair Kyu Keshi	20 Dec
Silver	Eka Prasetya Viktor; Hadi Samsul; Nofrisal; Nur Adil Saiyed; Pago Hendra; Purnomo Yudi; Rijal Saiful; Sihab Abrian; Uba Husni	Sepaktakraw	Men's Double Team	20 Dec
Silver	Women's team	Traditional Boat Race	Women's 5 Crew 500m	20 Dec
Silver	Stevanus Ong	Taekwondo	Men's -58 kg	20 Dec
Silver	Mohammad Ervan	Chess	Men's Traditional Standard	21 Dec
Silver	Dewi Ardhiani Citra; Nadya Anggraini Mukmin; Chelsie Monica Sihite; Dita Karenza	Chess	Women's ASEAN Team Rapid	21 Dec
Silver	Andriyan; Adityo Putra	Diving	Men's 10m platform Synchronized	21 Dec
Silver	Men's team	Football	Men's team	21 Dec
Silver	Horas Manurung	Judo	Men's -90 kg	21 Dec
Silver	Shinta Chaniago; Suntono	Kempo	Mixed kumi embu pair yudansha	21 Dec
Silver	Dian Pertiwi Said	Kempo	Women's -48 kg	21 Dec
Silver	Isna Suryani	Kempo	Women's -54 kg	21 Dec
Silver	Nur Indah Eka Yanti; Yulia Sari	Kempo	Women's kumi embu pair yudansha	21 Dec
Silver	Indra Ashari Jaya	Muay	Men's -71 kg	21 Dec
Silver	Mixed Team	Traditional Boat Race	Mixed 20 crew 2000m	21 Dec
Silver	Women's team	Traditional Boat Race	Women's 20 crew 2000m	21 Dec
Silver	Selviana Jehabut	Taekwondo	Men's -73 kg	21 Dec
Silver	Men's team	Volleyball	Men's team	21 Dec
Silver	Ni Luh Kadek Apriyanti; I Gede Kusumajaya; Agus Saka Aryadi Putra; I Gede Suwiwa	Vovinam	Mixed Da Luyen Vu Khi Nu	21 Dec
Bronze	Thalia Lovita Sosrodjojo	Wushu	Women's Changquan	08 Dec
Bronze	Juwita Niza Wasni	Wushu	Women's nandao	08 Dec
Bronze	Suparmanto	Wrestling	Men's Greco-Roman -55 kg	09 Dec
Bronze	Thalia Lovita Sosrodjojo	Wushu	Women's quiangshu	09 Dec
Bronze	Harba Sibuea	Wushu	Men's 52 kg	09 Dec
Bronze	Friska Ria Wibowo	Wushu	Women's 48 kg	09 Dec
Bronze	Ridha Wahdani Ridwan	Wrestling	Women's freestyle -59 kg	10 Dec
Bronze	Natalie C. Tanasa; Thalia L. Sosrodjojo	Wushu	Women's duilian Doubles	10 Dec
Bronze	Otto Satyawan Rachmad	Equestrian	Endurance	11 Dec
Bronze	Otto Satyawan Rachmad; Sopyan Gelar Mulyana; Yusnar Yusuf; R. Ohimat	Equestrian	Endurance Team	11 Dec
Bronze	Triady Fauzi Sidiq; Putera Muhammad Randa; Alexis Wijaya Ohmar; Ricky Anggawijaya	Swimming	Men's 4 × 200 m freestyle relay	12 Dec
Bronze	Anwar Tarra; Eka Octarorianus	Canoeing	Men's C2 200m	13 Dec
Bronze	Faizal Zainuddin	Karate	Men's kata individual	13 Dec
Bronze	Aswar; Faizal Zainuddin; Fidelys Lolobua	Karate	Men's Kata Team	13 Dec
Bronze	Ayu Rahmawati; Eva Fitria Setiawati; Siti Maryam	Karate	Women's Kata Team	13 Dec
Bronze	Cristy Florensia; Citra Kusuma Mega; Isni Chikita Nur; Lena; Michele Akyko; Dini Mita Sari; Eva Rahmawati; Rike Media Sari; Hasmawati Umar	Sepaktakraw	Women's team	13 Dec
Bronze	Ressa Kania Dewi; Kathriana Gustianjani; Raina Saumi Ramdhani; Patricia Yosita Hapsari	Swimming	Women's 4 × 100 m freestyle relay	13 Dec
Bronze	Inadrah	Wrestling	Women's freestyle -48 kg	13 Dec
Bronze	Wisnu Yuli Prasetyo	Badminton	Men's singles	14 Dec
Bronze	Jefry Johanis Wuaten	Bodybuilding	Men's 60 kg	14 Dec
Bronze	Edoardus Apcowo	Bodybuilding	Men's 70 kg	14 Dec
Bronze	Ericok Amanopunyo	Boxing	Men's -64 kg	14 Dec
Bronze	Koes Diyono	Boxing	Men's -69 kg	14 Dec
Bronze	Alex Tatontos	Boxing	Men's -75 kg	14 Dec
Bronze	Imacular Loda	Boxing	Women's -57 kg	14 Dec
Bronze	Medina Warda Aulia	Chess	Women's international individual blitz	14 Dec
Bronze	Ferry Wahyu Hadiyanto	Equestrian	Dressage	14 Dec
Bronze	Iman Tauhid Ragananda	Karate	Men's kumite -55 kg	14 Dec
Bronze	Sanistya Rani Cok Istri Agung	Karate	Women's kumite -61 kg	14 Dec
Bronze	Indah Mogia Angkat	Karate	Women's kumite -68 kg	14 Dec
Bronze	Ricky Anggawijaya	Swimming	Men's 100m backstroke	14 Dec
Bronze	Glenn Victor Sutanto	Swimming	Men's 100m butterfly	14 Dec
Bronze	Edi Kurniawan	Weightlifting	Men's -77 kg	14 Dec
Bronze	Citra Febrianti	Weightlifting	Women's -53 kg	14 Dec
Bronze	Edy Ariansyah	Athletics	Men's 400m	15 Dec
Bronze	Hermanto	Athletics	Men's discus throw	15 Dec
Bronze	Hekta; Jaka Kurniawan	Billiards and Snooker	English Billiard Team	15 Dec
Bronze	Komara Dhita Jana	Bodybuilding	Men's 80 kg	15 Dec
Bronze	Taufik Halay	Chess	Men's Traditional Individual Blitz	15 Dec
Bronze	Yanthi Fuchianty	Cycling	Women's 30 km Individual Time Trial	15 Dec
Bronze	Angga Laksmana; Hendro Salim; Umar Syarief; Donny Dharmawan; Imam Ragananda; Jintar Simanjuntak; Christo Mondolu	Karate	Men's kumite Team	15 Dec
Bronze	Johan	Pencak Silat	Men's -55 kg	15 Dec
Bronze	Sapto Purnomo	Pencak Silat	Men's -65 kg	15 Dec
Bronze	Ahmad Siregar	Pencak Silat	Men's -75 kg	15 Dec
Bronze	Riau Ega Salsabilla; Ika Yuliana Rochmawati	Archery	Mixed Recurve Team	16 Dec
Bronze	Ika Yuliana Rochmawati	Archery	Women's recurve Individual	16 Dec
Bronze	Yaspi Boby; Iswandi; Fadlin; Muhammad Rozikin	Athletics	Men's 4 × 100 m Relay	16 Dec
Bronze	Lusiana Satriani; Tri Setyo Utami; Niafatul Aini; Ni Nyoman Kerni	Athletics	Women's 4 × 100 m Relay	16 Dec
Bronze	Memo	Rowing	Men's single sculls	16 Dec
Bronze	Susanti; Waode Fitri	Rowing	Women's lightweight double sculls	16 Dec
Bronze	Johan Prasetya; Alek Edwar; Riau Ega Salsabilla	Archery	Men's recurve team	17 Dec
Bronze	Ridwan	Athletics	Men's 5000m	17 Dec
Bronze	Taufik Halay	Chess	Men's Asean individual rapid	17 Dec
Bronze	Medina Warda Aulia	Chess	Women's international Individual Rapid	17 Dec
Bronze	Deri Fitri; Jenneth Dethan; Nur Indah Yanti; Orva Trifena	Kempo	Women's dantai embu group 4 kenshi	17 Dec
Bronze	Ratna; Yayah Rokayah; Syifa Lisdiana; Yuniarty	Rowing	Women's lightweight coxless four	17 Dec
Bronze	Farid Firman Syah; Masruri Rahman	Chess	Men's pair transfer blitz	18 Dec
Bronze	Robin Manullang	Cycling	Men's 163 km Individual	18 Dec
Bronze	Adityo Restu Putra	Diving	Men's 10m platform	18 Dec
Bronze	Eka Purnama Indah	Diving	Women's 3m springboard	18 Dec
Bronze	Jendry Palandeng	Equestrian	Show Jumping	18 Dec
Bronze	Tatiana Wijaya	Golf	Women's individual	18 Dec
Bronze	Tri Kusumawardani Susanti	Judo	Women's -45 kg	18 Dec
Bronze	Ronald Huiyanto	Kempo	Men's -60 kg	18 Dec
Bronze	Gheffy Bushido Zidra; Irvan Ramdani	Kempo	Mixed kumi embu pair kyu kenshi	18 Dec
Bronze	Men's team	Traditional Boat Race	Men's 20 crew 1000m	18 Dec
Bronze	Mixed Team	Traditional Boat Race	Mixed 10 crew 1000m	18 Dec
Bronze	Mixed Team	Traditional Boat Race	Mixed 20 crew 1000m	18 Dec
Bronze	Women's team	Traditional Boat Race	Women's 10 crew 1000m	18 Dec
Bronze	Women's team	Traditional Boat Race	Women's 20 crew 1000m	18 Dec
Bronze	Defia Rosmaniar; Muhammad Abdurrahman	Taekwondo	Mixed Pair	18 Dec
Bronze	Defia Rosmaniar; Kevita Rizkia; Mutiara Habiba	Taekwondo	Women's poomsae team	18 Dec
Bronze	Ridwan	Athletics	Men's 1500m	19 Dec
Bronze	Agus Prayogo	Athletics	Men's 10000m	19 Dec
Bronze	Dede Lioe	Chess	Men's Asean individual rapid	19 Dec
Bronze	Gusti Bagus Saputra	Cycling	Men's BMX	19 Dec
Bronze	Mochammad Syaiful Raharjo	Judo	Men's -66 kg	19 Dec
Bronze	Dewinda Ariani Trisna	Judo	Women's -48 kg	19 Dec
Bronze	Ismayasari	Judo	Women's -52 kg	19 Dec
Bronze	Men's team	Traditional Boat Race	Men's 10 crew 500m	19 Dec
Bronze	Women's team	Traditional Boat Race	Women's 10 crew 500m	19 Dec
Bronze	Muhammad Salputra	Taekwondo	Men's -80 kg	19 Dec
Bronze	Agus Saka Aryadi Putra	Vovinam	Men's -60 kg	19 Dec
Bronze	I Ketut Sulendra; Dewik Puji Astutik	Vovinam	Mixed Tu Ve Nu Gioi	19 Dec
Bronze	Ni Gusti Agung Ayu	Vovinam	Women's Tinh Hoa Luong Nghi Kiem Phap	19 Dec
Bronze	Susanto Megaranto; Dewi Citra	Chess	Mixed pair transfer blitz	20 Dec
Bronze	Ahmad Sukran Jamjami; Adityo Restu Putra	Diving	Men's 3m springboard Synchronized	20 Dec
Bronze	Mohamad Gozali; Nur Ali; Renaldi; Ade Andyka; Fhandy Permana; Andri Agustin; Andri Kustiawan; Asep Irwan; Ivan Cahyadi; Anza Anmas; Syah Lubis; Ardy Suardy; Bambang Saptaji; Julinur Hafid	Futsal	Men's team	20 Dec
Bronze	Putu Adesta	Judo	Men's -81 kg	20 Dec
Bronze	Ni Kadek Pandini	Judo	Women's -57 kg	20 Dec
Bronze	Tiara Arta Garthia	Judo	Women's -70 kg	20 Dec
Bronze	I Gusti Made Oka Sulaksana	Sailing	Open RS One	20 Dec
Bronze	Cristy Florensia; Citra Kusuma Mega; Isni Chikita Nur; Lena; Michele Akyko; Dini Mita Sari; Eva Rahmawati; Rike Media Sari; Hasmawati Umar	Sepaktakraw	Women's Double Team	20 Dec
Bronze	Men's team	Traditional Boat Race	Men's 5 Crew 500m	20 Dec
Bronze	Mixed Team	Traditional Boat Race	Mixed 10 crew 500m	20 Dec
Bronze	Women's team	Volleyball	Women's team	20 Dec
Bronze	I Putu Agus Ardiana	Vovinam	Men's -55 kg	20 Dec
Bronze	Ni Luh Kadek Apriyanti	Vovinam	Women's -60 kg	20 Dec
Bronze	Linadini Yasmin; Dewi Setyaningsih	Diving	Women's 10m platform Synchronized	21 Dec
Bronze	Adwin Sumantri	Judo	Men's -100 kg	21 Dec
Bronze	Desi Yudiyanti	Judo	Women's -78 kg	21 Dec
Bronze	Yusuf Susilo	Muay	Men's -57 kg	21 Dec
Bronze	Angga	Muay	Men's -75 kg	21 Dec
Bronze	Henni Pasaribu	Muay	Women's -60 kg	21 Dec
Bronze	Men's team	Traditional Boat Race	Men's 20 crew 2000m	21 Dec
Bronze	Aggie Prasbowo	Taekwondo	Men's -48 kg	21 Dec
Bronze	Basuki Nugroho	Taekwondo	Men's +87 kg	21 Dec
Bronze	Aghniny Haque	Taekwondo	Women's -46 kg	21 Dec
Bronze	Eka Sahara	Taekwondo	Women's -73 kg	21 Dec
Bronze	Samsul Hadi; Saiful Rijal; Husni Uba	Sepaktakraw	Men's Double Regu	22 Dec
Bronze	Mega Citra; Leni; Dini Mita Sari	Sepaktakraw	Women's Double Regu	22 Dec

== Medal by sports ==
=== Medal table ===
Sport	Gold	Silver	Bronze	Total	Ranking
Kenpō	7	7	3	17	1
Athletics	6	4	7	17	3
Swimming	5	6	4	15	3
Chess	5	4	7	16	2
Cycling	5	4	3	12	1
Rowing	5	1	3	9	1
Canoeing	4	5	1	10	3
Pencak silat	4	4	3	11	1
Wushu	4	3	6	13	3
Badminton	3	3	1	7	1
Weightlifting	3	2	2	7	2
Karate	2	7	7	16	3
Traditional boat race	2	5	10	17	2
Wrestling	2	5	3	10	4
Vovinam	2	2	5	9	4
Equestrian	2	2	4	8	2
Archery	2	2	3	7	2
Billiards and Snooker	2	1	1	4	3
Boxing	0	4	4	8	5
Taekwondo	0	3	7	10	7
Judo	0	2	9	11	7
Diving	0	2	4	6	2
Sepak takraw	0	2	4	6	3
Muay	0	1	3	4	7
Volleyball	0	1	1	2	2
Football	0	1	0	1	2
Water Polo	0	1	0	1	2
Bodybuilding	0	0	3	3	5
Futsal	0	0	1	1	3
Golf	0	0	1	1	5
Sailing	0	0	1	1	6
Total	65	84	111	260	4
