= 2013 SEA Games =

Multi-sport event in Nay Pyi Taw, Myanmar

XXVII Southeast Asian Games
- Host city: Naypyidaw, Myanmar
- Motto: Green, Clean and Friendly (Burmese: အစိမ်းရောင်သန့်ရှင်းခြင်းနှင့်ချစ်ကြည်ရေး, romanized: aahcaimraung san shinn hkyinn nhang hkyitkyirayy)
- Nations: 11
- Athletes: 4730
- Events: 460 in 34 sports
- Opening: 11 December 2013
- Closing: 22 December 2013
- Opened by: Nyan Tun; Vice President of Myanmar
- Closed by: Nyan Tun; Vice President of Myanmar
- Athlete's Oath: Sandi Oo
- Torch lighter: Maung Wai Lin Tun
- Main venue: Wunna Theikdi Stadium
- Website: 2013 Southeast Asian Games

The 2013 SEA Games (Burmese: ၂၀၁၃ ခုနှစ် အရှေ့တောင် အာရှ အားကစား ပြိုင်ပွဲ, romanized: 2013 Hkunnit Ashetaung Asha Agaza Pyaingbwe, pronounced [n̥ɪʔtʰàʊɴ tɪʔsʰɛ̀ θóʊɴ ṵn̥ɪʔ ʔəʃḛtàʊɴ ʔàʃa̰ ʔáka̰sá pjàɪɴpwɛ́]), officially known as the 27th Southeast Asian Games, or the 27th SEA Games, and commonly known as Myanmar 2013 or Nay Pyi Taw 2013, were a Southeast Asian multi-sport event which took place in Naypyidaw, Myanmar from 11 to 22 December 2013. Around 4730 athletes from 11 participating nations competed at the games, which featured 460 events in 34 sports.

It was the third time for Myanmar in hosting the Southeast Asian Games. The country hosted the Games in 1961 and 1969 respectively in Yangon, then capital of the country. Singapore withdrew its hosting rights due to expected delays in the completion of its new national stadium, and it eventually hosted in 2015. Naypyidaw became the second city in Myanmar to host the Southeast Asian Games. The games were opened and closed by Nyan Tun, the Vice-president of Myanmar at the Wunna Theikdi stadium.

The final medal tally was led by Thailand, followed by host Myanmar and Vietnam. Several Games and national records were broken during the games. Though there were several controversies, including the inclusion of the traditional Burmese game of chinlone as a competitive sport, the Games were generally deemed successful with the rising standard of competition amongst the Southeast Asian nations.

== Organisation ==
=== Host city ===
Myanmar, Vietnam, Philippines and Thailand revealed their intentions to host the 2013 edition. However, since the latter three nations hosted the 2003, 2005 and 2007 editions, respectively, these countries were less favored to host this edition.

Myanmar held the longest interval between hosting the games, spanning a time of 44 years. The Southeast Asian Games Federation (SEAGF) Council met in Jakarta on 31 May 2010 unanimously agreed to award the Myanmar Olympic Committee the right to host the 27th edition of the games. The official website of the Olympic Council of Asia also approved the fact that Myanmar would host the 27th Southeast Asian Games in its news launched on 7 June 2010. ASEAN Football Federation (AFF)'s official website also announced that Myanmar would host the games.

=== Development and preparation ===
The Myanmar SEA Games Organising Committee (MYASOC) was formed to oversee the staging of the event.

=== Venues ===
Host cities

Nay Pyi Taw

Wunna Theikdi Indoor Stadium

Wunna Theikdi Sports Complex

- Main Stadium (Opening and Closing Ceremony, Athletics)
- Indoor Stadium (Badminton, Chinlone, Karate, Sepak takraw, Wushu, Taekwondo, Table tennis)
- Futsal Indoor Stadium (Futsal)
- Boxing Indoor Stadium (Boxing, Muay)
- Billiard & Snooker Indoor Stadium (Billiards and snooker)
- Aquatic Centre (Diving, Swimming)
- Equestrian Field (Equestrian)
- Games village (Petanque)
- Archery field (Archery)

Zayarthiri Sports Complex

- Main Stadium (Men's football)
- Indoor Stadium (Volleyball, Judo, Vovinam, Pencak Silat, Basketball)
- Swimming Pool (Water Polo)

Other venues

- Mount Pleasant (Cycling BMX, cross country, downhill)
- Ngalaik Dam (Canoeing, Rowing, Traditional Boat Race)
- Roads of Leway, Pyinmana, and Tatkon (Cycling – Road)
- Royal Myanmar Golf Course (Golf)
- Zabuthiri Hotel (Chess)

Yangon

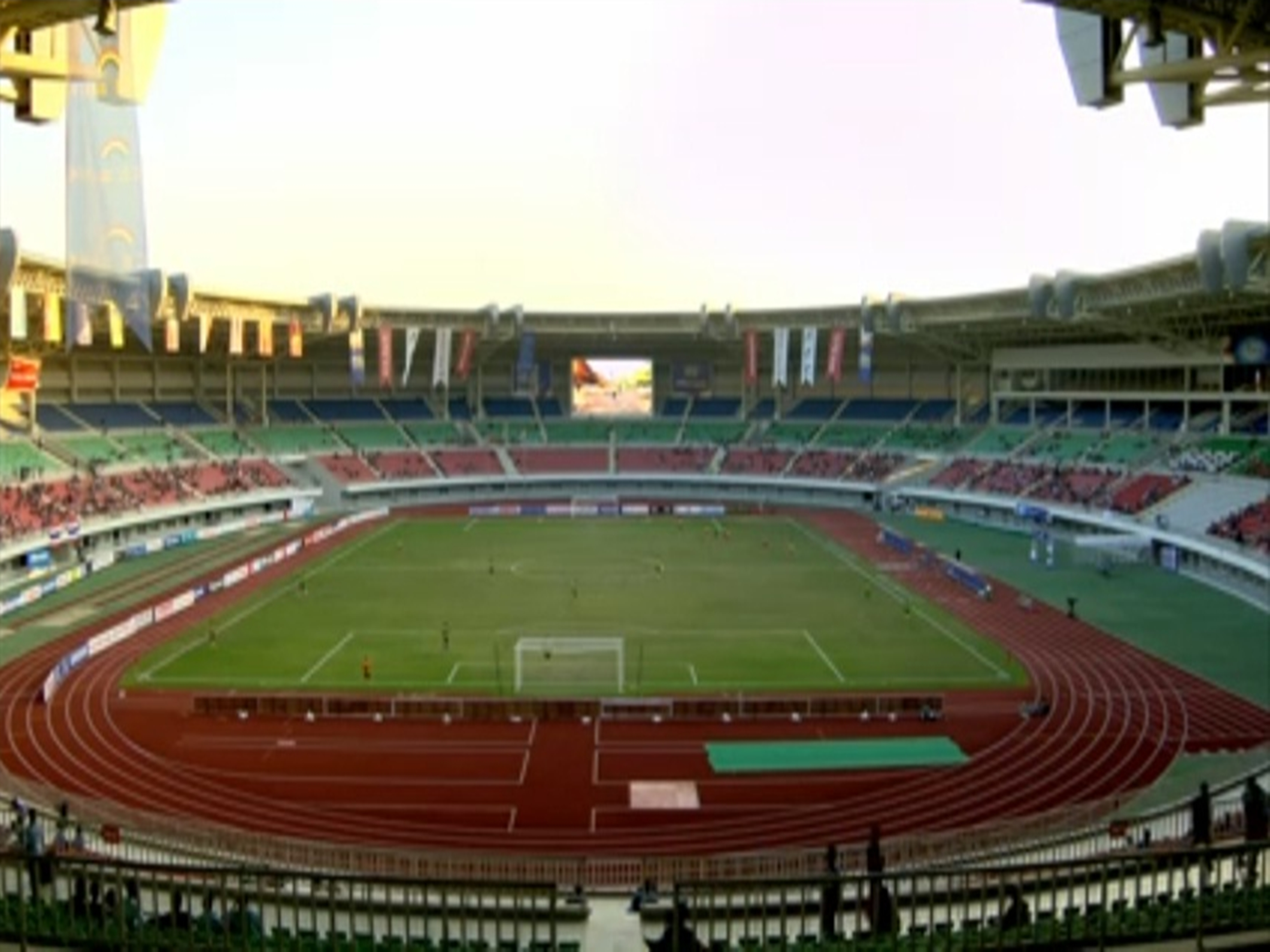
Zayyarthiri Stadium in Nay Pyi Taw

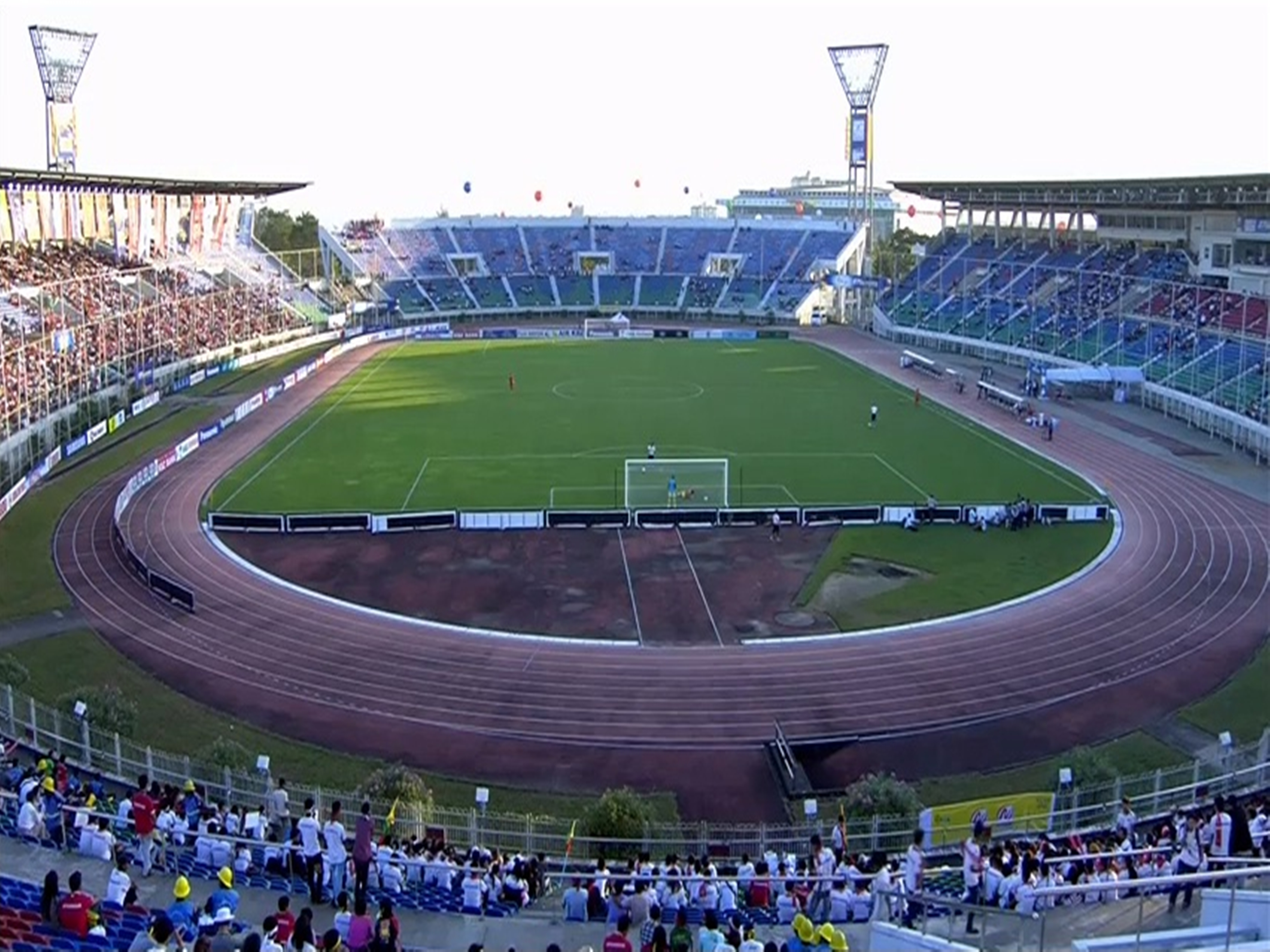
Thuwunna Stadium in Yangon

- Thuwunna Stadium (Men's football)
- Thuwunna Indoor Stadium (Wrestling, Kenpō)
- Thein Pyu Stadium (Weightlifting)
- Hockey Field (Field Hockey)
- North Dagon Shooting Range (Shooting)
- Myanmar Convention Center (Bodybuilding)

Mandalay

- Mandalarthiri Stadium (Women's football)
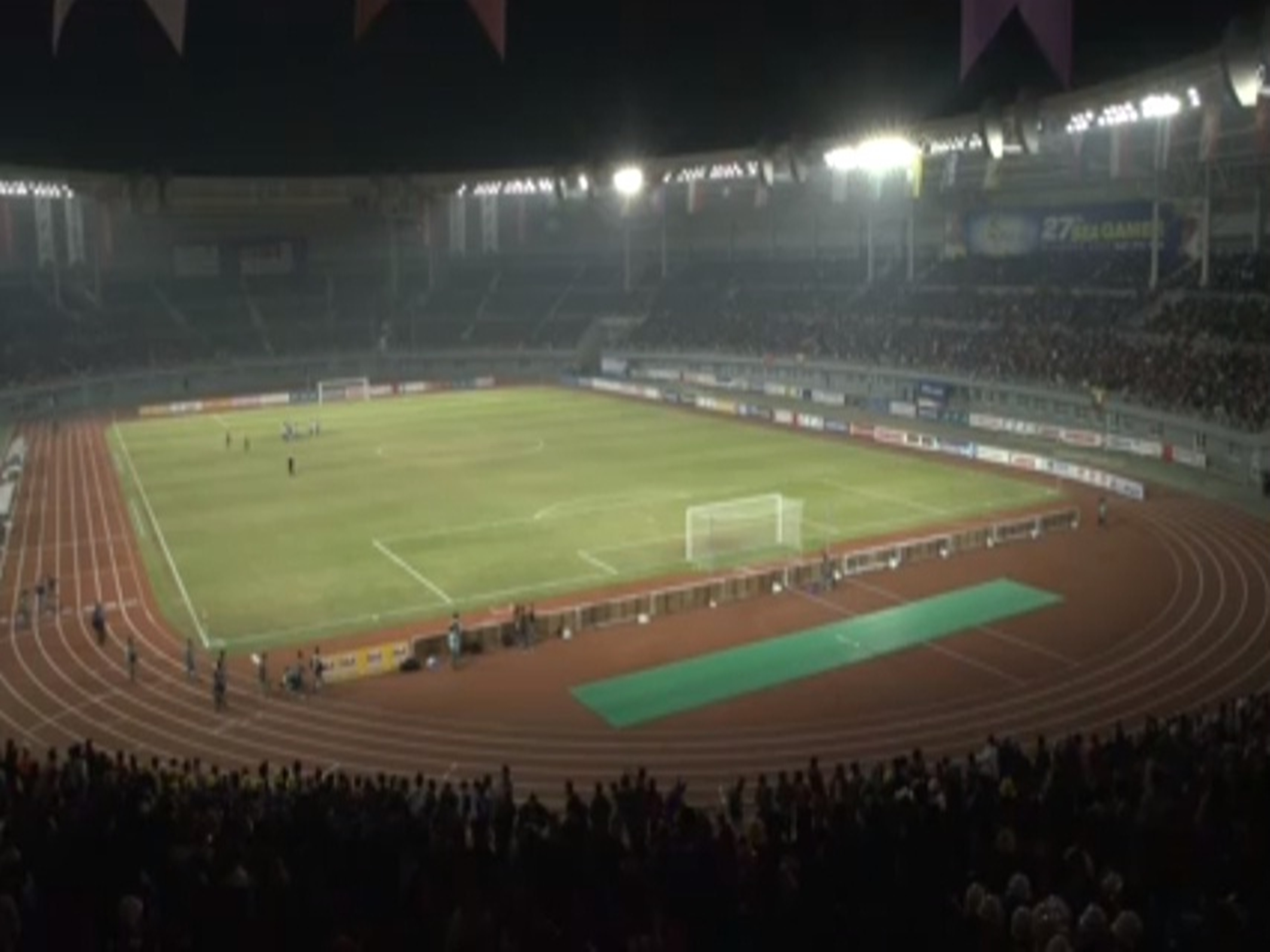
  Mandalarthiri Stadium in Mandalay

Ngwesaung

- Ngwesaung Beach (Sailing)

=== Public transport ===
As Naypyidaw was yet to be fully developed into a city, only shuttle bus services were provided throughout the games and were used to ferry athletes and officials to and from the airport, games venues and games village. The co-host cities of the games, Yangon, Mandalay and Ngwesaung also provided the same services during the games.

=== Countdown ===
The official countdown to the games' opening ceremony began a year prior on 11 December 2012. The countdown clocks were located in Nay Pyi Taw and other cities in Myanmar that co-hosted the games.

=== Torch relay ===
The torch relay of the games began at Yangon's Thuwunna Indoor Stadium and ended in Nay Pyi Taw during the opening ceremony, covering a distance of 320 kilometres.

== Marketing ==
=== Logo ===
The logo of the 2013 Southeast Asian Games is an image of the map of Myanmar. The Southeast Asian Games Federation logo at the tip of the logo, has eleven rings which resembling the 11 Southeast Asian countries and the Southeast Asian Games Federation. Yellow, green and red, the national colours on Myanmar's National Flag, represents Myanmar as the games' host nation. The yellow circle represents equality and fraternity, green color represents love of nature and the green economy, while the red color represents courage and hard working nature of Myanmar. The circular shape represents complete perfection and endless prosperity among the Southeast Asian countries.

=== Mascot ===
Shwe Yoe & Ma Moe, the official mascot

The official mascot of the 2013 Southeast Asian Games is a couple of owls named Shwe Yoe and Ma Moe. The owls are considered lucky charms in Burmese tradition. The owl is globally taken to be the wisest, calmest and balanced animal. But, in Myanmar, it is also taken to be auspicious and believed to bring forth luck and prosperity to the family, for which the owl dolls are kept at their homes as lucky charms. The owl as the official mascot of Myanmar SEA Games 2013 has a personality: wise, calm, lucky, loyal, and friendly. The personality of an owl was intended to bring forth co-operation, friendship, and better understanding among the participating countries. The mascots are named after a famous Burmese dance, U Shwe Yoe and Daw Moe.

=== Songs ===
Several songs, including the theme of the games "Colourful Garden", were written by Lin Htet for the 2013 Southeast Asian Games.

== The Games ==
=== Opening ceremony ===
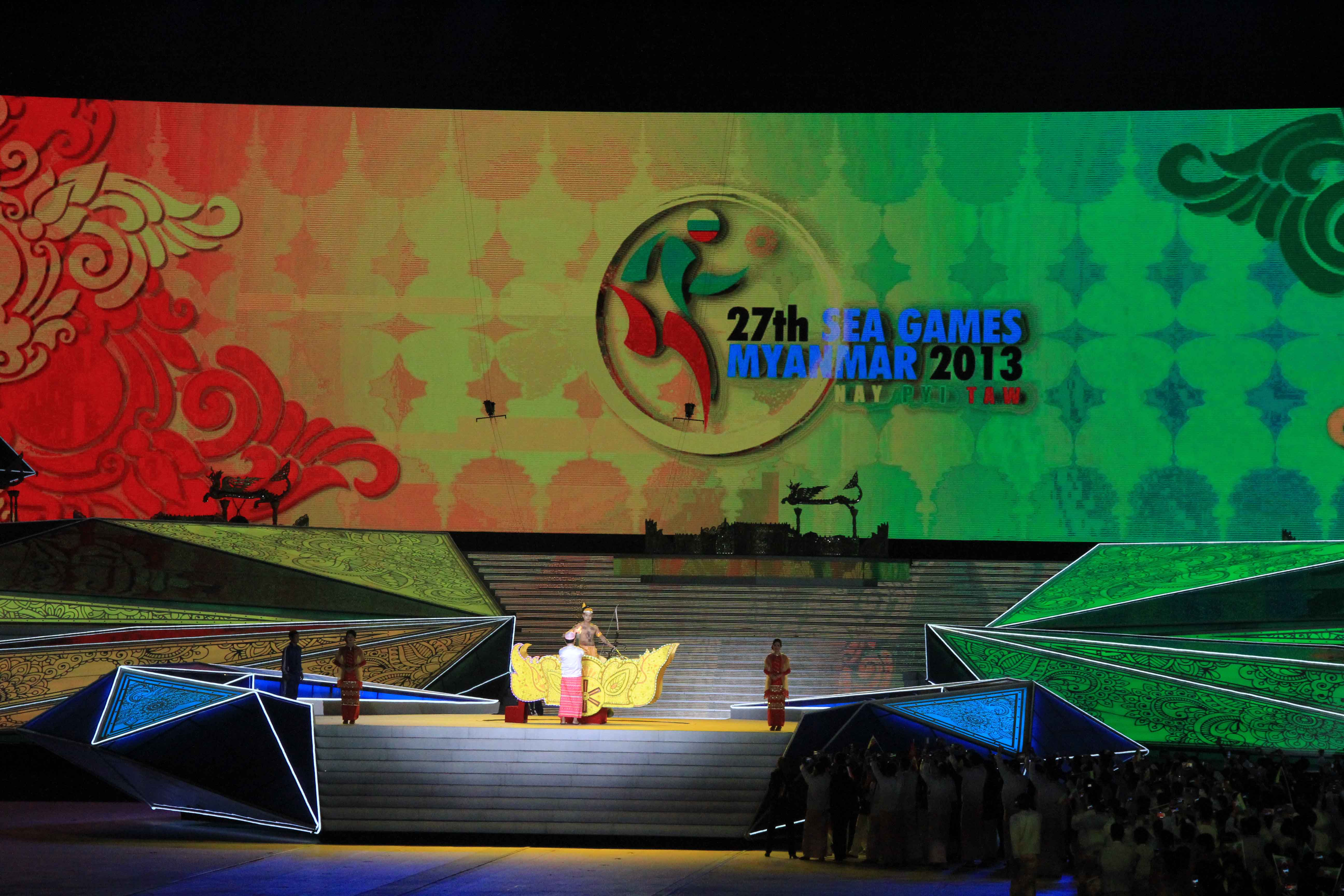
27th SEA Games opening ceremony at Wunna Theikdi Stadium in Naypyidaw

The opening ceremony was held on 11 December 2013 at the Wunna Theikdi Stadium. It marked the nation's biggest sporting event since 1969. It was led with pre-launch entertainment and a series of screens beamed a dramatic lights show during the Chinese-backed extravaganza.

The ceremony began with fireworks displays at the stadium. The theme song "Colourful Garden" was performed during the flag-raising ceremony after performances made by 12,000 school children and the Myanmar Royal Auspicious Orchestra. Chairman of the 27th SEA Games Organising Committee, Vice-President Nyan Tun opened the Games with another explosion of colourful fireworks. The Games' torch was relayed by six former Burmese athletes before Aye Myint Kyu, the Union Minister for Culture, handed it to a Burmese archer where he lit up the Games cauldron by shooting an arrow into it.

A showcase of arts and culture about Burmese history was made, with dance performances accompanied the ending of the ceremony.

=== Closing ceremony ===
The closing ceremony was held at Wunna Theikdi Stadium on 22 December 2013. It was started with an hour of music following the performance of "Colorful Garden", the theme song for the Games and subsequently, "Loyalty of Blood" was later presented by well-known artists May Sweet and Maykhala. The musical hors d'oeuvres concluded with all artists joining together in "Be Peaceful". President Thein Sein and his wife Khin Khin Win then entered the stadium, following which the Closing Ceremony was officially opened with pyrotechnic displays.

Four performances were presented with the first directly connecting the SEA Games to Burmese tradition, celebrating the sport of chinlone, which is believed to have first appeared in Myanmar in the 5th century. It was then followed with the "Elephant Dance" which was about paying tribute to the elephants in Myanmar.

The Closing Ceremony then paid homage to the ethnic diversity of the country with the performance of "Everlasting Myanmar", depicting the rich diversity of the population, and simultaneously the many obstacles on the path to realizing a new, peaceful and prosperous modern state.

Medal winners of all participating countries were then paraded onto the stadium floor to the beat of martial music. Chants of "Myanmar" rang through the stadium when the hosts entered.

With the procession complete, VP Nyan Tun officially announced the 27th SEA Games concluded, as strobe lights searched the sky and a cornucopia of fireworks exploded over the stadium.

After Myanmar handed over the SEA Games responsibilities to Singapore, host of the 2015 Southeast Asian Games, the Games ended with one last round of fireworks and round of musical performances.

=== Participating nations ===
- Brunei (72 athletes)
- Cambodia (243)
- Indonesia (665)
- Laos (343)
- Malaysia (582)
- Myanmar (990) (host)
- Philippines (219)
- Singapore (310)
- Thailand (746)
- Timor-Leste (49)
- Vietnam (511)

=== Sports ===
The 2013 SEA Games had 34 sports, fewer than the previous edition. Beach volleyball and Dancesport were omitted due to issues regarding uniforms. Tennis and gymnastics, two Olympic sports, were not contested. Instead, chinlone and Shorinji Kempo took their places. In this edition of the Games, floorball was also contested as a demonstration sport.

- Aquatics
  - Diving
  - Swimming
  - Water polo
- Archery (10)
- Athletics (46)
- Badminton (5)
- Basketball (2)
- Billiards and snooker (12) ¹
- Bodybuilding (5) ʰ
- Boxing (14)
- Canoeing (16)
- Chess (18) ¹
- Chinlone ³
- Cycling
- Equestrian
- Football
  - Futsal
- Golf
- Field hockey
- Judo
- Karate ¹
- Shorinji Kempo ²
- Muay ʰ
- Pencak silat ²
- Pétanque ²
- Rowing
- Sailing
- Sepak takraw
- Shooting
- Table tennis
- Taekwondo
- Traditional boat race ¹
- Volleyball
  - Indoor
- Vovinam ²
- Weightlifting
- Wrestling
- Wushu ¹

¹ – not an official Olympic sport.
² – sport played only at the SEAG.
³ – not a traditional Olympic nor SEAG Sport and introduced only by the host country.
° – a former official Olympic sport, not applied in previous host countries and was introduced only by the host country.
ʰ- sport not played at the previous edition and was reintroduced by the host country.

=== Calendar ===
OC	Opening ceremony	●	Event competitions	1	Gold medal events	CC	Closing ceremony

December		4 Wed	5 Thu	6 Fri	7 Sat	8 Sun	9 Mon	10 Tue	11 Wed	12 Thu	13 Fri	14 Sat	15 Sun	16 Mon	17 Tue	18 Wed	19 Thu	20 Fri	21 Sat	22 Sun	Events
Ceremonies									OC											CC	—N/a
Aquatics	Diving															2	2	2	2		8
Aquatics	Swimming									6	7	7	6	6							32
Aquatics	Water polo			●	●	●	●	1													1
Archery												●	●	6	4						10
Athletics													9	8	9	8	12				46
Badminton								●		●	●	5									5
Basketball						●	●	●		●	●	●	●	2							2
Cue sports											1	1	3	2	●	3	1	1			12
Bodybuilding												3	2								5
Boxing						●	●	●		●	●	14									14
Canoeing								4		6	6										16
Chess										1	2	2	2	2	3	1	1	1	3		18
Chinlone		2	2	●	2	●	2														8
Cycling										1	2	2	2	1	1	2	2				13
Equestrian								2			1	1			1	1					6
Football					●	●	●	●		●	●	●	●	●	●	●	●	3	1		4
Golf													●	●	●	4					4
Field hockey											●	●	●	●	●	●	●	1	1		2
Judo																4	4	5	5		18
Karate											6	9	2								17
Kenpo															2	3		6	7		18
Muay															●	●	●		14		14
Pencak silat							●	●		●	5		10								15
Petanque										●	2	●	2	●	2	1	2	●	2		11
Rowing												●	●	5	4						9
Sailing													●	●	1	●	●	12			13
Sepak takraw								2	●		2	●		2	●		1	1		2	10
Shooting									2	2	2	2	2	●	2						12
Table tennis															●	●	2	●	2		4
Taekwondo																7	4	4	6		21
Traditional boat race																6	4	4	3		17
Volleyball											●	●	●	●	●	●	●	●	2		2
Vovinam																	7	6	5		18
Weightlifting											3	3	3	2							11
Wrestling							5	6		5	5										21
Wushu					4	6	9	4													23
Daily medal events		2	2	0	6	6	16	19	2	21	42	49	43	36	29	42	44	46	53	2	460
Cumulative total		2	4	4	10	16	32	51	53	74	116	165	208	244	273	315	359	405	458	460	460
December		4 Wed	5 Thu	6 Fri	7 Sat	8 Sun	9 Mon	10 Tue	11 Wed	12 Thu	13 Fri	14 Sat	15 Sun	16 Mon	17 Tue	18 Wed	19 Thu	20 Fri	21 Sat	22 Sun	Total events

=== Medal table ===
Timor Leste competed for the 6th time at the games and got their best finish as of 2025.

A total of 1531 medals, comprising 461 Gold medals, 459 Silver medals and 611 Bronze medals were awarded to athletes. The host Myanmar's performance was their best to date and placed second overall amongst participating nations.

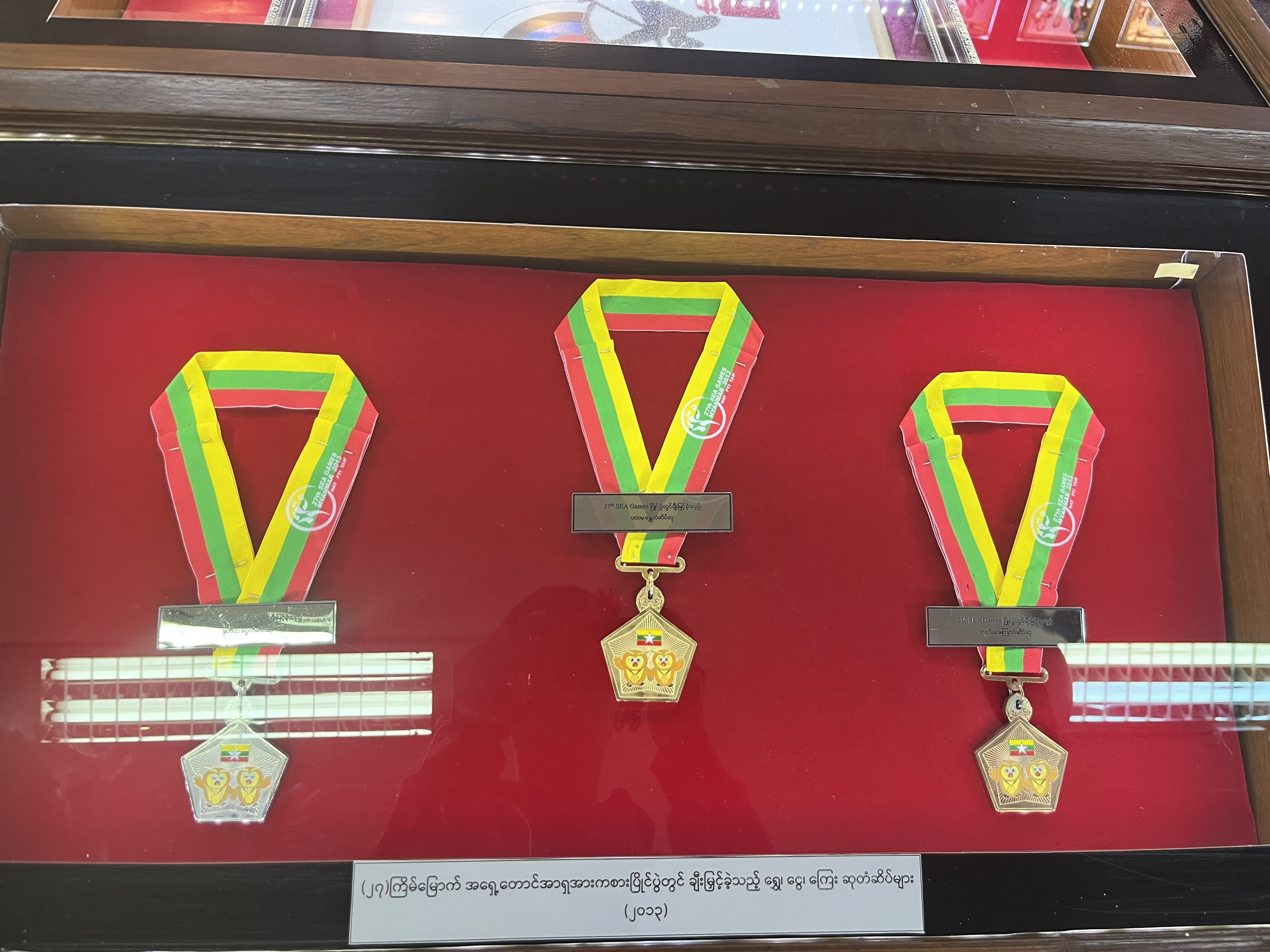
Medals of the games

For convenience, this is the official medal table of the 2013 SEA Games, not including the subsequent medal changes.

* Host nation (Myanmar)

Rank	Nation	Gold	Silver	Bronze	Total
1	Thailand	107	94	81	282
2	Myanmar*	86	62	85	233
3	Vietnam	73	86	86	245
4	Indonesia	65	84	111	260
5	Malaysia	43	38	77	158
6	Singapore	34	29	45	108
7	Philippines	29	34	38	101
8	Laos	13	17	49	79
9	Cambodia	8	11	28	47
10	Timor-Leste	2	3	5	10
11	Brunei	1	1	6	8
Totals (11 entries)		461	459	611	1,531

Medal changes

In September 2014, Myanmar gold medalists Saw Marlar Nwe (athletics) and Min Zaw Oo (bodybuilding), along with Indonesian gold and silver medalist Indra Gunawan (swimming), tested positive for a banned drug and were stripped of their medals.

Ruling date	Sport	Event	Nation	Gold	Silver	Bronze	Total
2013	Athletics	Women's 20 kilometres walk	Myanmar	–1	+1	–1	–1
2013	Athletics	Women's 20 kilometres walk	Vietnam	+1	−1		0
2013	Athletics	Women's 20 kilometres walk	Thailand			+1	+1
2013	Bodybuilding	80 kg	Myanmar	–1			–1
2013	Bodybuilding	80 kg	Thailand	+1	−1		0
2013	Bodybuilding	80 kg	Indonesia		+1	−1	0
2013	Bodybuilding	80 kg	Malaysia			+1	+1
2014	Swimming	Men's 100 metre breaststroke	Indonesia		−1		–1
2014	Swimming	Men's 100 metre breaststroke	Philippines		+1	−1	0
2014	Swimming	Men's 100 metre breaststroke	Thailand			+1	+1
2014	Swimming	Men's 4 × 100 metre medley relay	Indonesia	–1			–1
2014	Swimming	Men's 4 × 100 metre medley relay	Singapore	+1	−1		0
2014	Swimming	Men's 4 × 100 metre medley relay	Thailand		+1	−1	0
2014	Swimming	Men's 4 × 100 metre medley relay	Malaysia			+1	+1

== Broadcasting ==
International Broadcast Center was constructed in Maniyadana Jade Hall in Naypyidaw.

Key

* Host nation (Myanmar)

2013 SEA Games Broadcasters rights in Southeast Asia
IOC Code	Country	Broadcast network	Television network	Radio network
BRU	Brunei	RTB	RTB1; Kristal-Astro	Radio Nasional Brunei
CAM	Cambodia	NTK	TVK	RNK Radio
INA	Indonesia	RRI; TVRI; Emtek	TVRI; SCTV; Indosiar; Nexmedia	RRI
LAO	Laos	Lao National Television	LNTV	LNR
MAS	Malaysia	Media Prima; Astro; Radio Televisyen Malaysia	RTM TV1; TV3 Malaysia; TV9 Malaysia; Astro SuperSport	Nasional FM; Hot FM; Fly FM
MYA	Myanmar*	MRTV-4	MRTV-4; For Sports; Sky Net	MRNS
PHI	Philippines	ABS-CBN Corporation	ABS-CBN; Studio 23; Balls; DZMM TeleRadyo	DZMM Radyo Patrol 630
SIN	Singapore	MediaCorp	MediaCorp Channel 5 MediaCorp HD5; MediaCorp Channel NewsAsia International; MediaCorp Okto; StarHub TV; Mio TV	MediaCorp Radio 938LIVE
THA	Thailand	Television Pool of Thailand	Channel 3 Channel 5 Channel 7 Modernine TV; NBT TV; SMM TV (Simulcast TPT Coverage)	Modern Radio, NBT Radio
TLS	(Timor-Leste) Timor Leste	RTTL	Televisão Timor Leste	Radio Timor Leste
VIE	Vietnam	VTV; VTC	VTV1; VTV3; VTC3	Voice of Vietnam

== Concerns and controversies ==
Event cut down

- Myanmar SEA Games Organizing Committee's decision to include Burmese traditional sports Chinlone and Sittuyin, and to exclude Olympic disciplines sports like gymnastics and tennis were not well received. The Philippines decided to send only 208 athletes, which was its smallest delegation in 14 years.

Football hooliganism

Following the shocking defeat of the Myanmar football team to Indonesia in the group match that caused them to fail to qualify for the semi-finals, Myanmar hooligan supporters tore up seats, hurled stones at officers as well as burning Southeast Asian Games memorabilia and other billboards.

Controversial decisions

- The 100m freestyle swimming event for women, which was held on 12 December, was restarted after Thailand protested and appealed for a re-swim. Thailand claimed that its swimmer participating in the sporting event stopped in the middle of the event after hearing the second horn which signalled a false start. The other swimmers did not stop and the race was not interrupted. Pinky Brosas, national head coach of the Philippine national swimming team criticised the organisers for not interrupting the race and noted that the officials did not put down the 50m flag.
- In the kata team event for women, the Vietnamese team protested the decision of the jurors, which gave the gold medal to the host team Myanmar. Subsequently, the juror committee had to have a meeting and admitted their mistakes. They released an apology to Vietnamese women kata team for their faults but the decision of the jury could not be changed.
- In the Pencak Silat Men's 55–60 kg, the committee did not give the gold medal that had to be given to Indonesia after Mohammad Adhan won the final against Ye Kyaw Thu from Myanmar because Myanmar protested the decision of the jurors decision, and even their protest being rejected by the jurors, the committee still keep the medal and instead of cancelling all of Men's 55–60 kg Tarung event result.
- In the football event for women, the coach of Myanmar women's national football team vowed to make an official complaint over the alleged lack of expertise of the Indian referee during the team's SEA Games defeat on penalties to Thailand. Burmese fans were outraged by decisions that disallowed a Burma goal for offside but allowed a contentious goal by Thailand to stand.
- In the Judo event, Indonesian Judo team refused one silver and two bronze medals awarded to them as a protest of alleged referee unfairness against host athlete. According to Indonesian Judo team coach, the referee should stop the match when the host athlete locked Indonesian athlete shoulder in illegal foul moves, but the referee decided to overlook it and continue the match resulting in the defeat and injury of Indonesian athlete.
- In 20 km walk event for women, Nguyen Thi Thanh Phuc, the defending champion and the Asian silver medallist, failed to defend her title as the host athlete Saw Marla Nwe walked much of the distance as if she was running, especially the last few metres to the finish. None of the judges warned her, while Viet Nam's complaint was ignored. Phuc cried when receiving the silver medal. Yet, in April 2014, the ASEAN Sports Federation announced the results of SEA Games' doping cases, including of Saw Marla Nwe. Nwe tested positive for a banned drug and her result would be cancelled. Phuc, the silver medallist, received the gold medal.

== See also ==
- 2014 ASEAN Para Games

Preceded by Jakarta–Palembang	Southeast Asian Games; Naypyidaw; XXVII Southeast Asian Games (2013)	Succeeded by Singapore
