= Swimming at the 2013 SEA Games – Men's 100 metre butterfly =

The Men's 100 metre butterfly event at the 2013 SEA Games took place on 14 December 2013 at Wunna Theikdi Aquatics Centre.

There were 15 competitors from 8 countries who took part in this event. Two heats were held. The heat in which a swimmer competed did not formally matter for advancement, as the swimmers with the top eight times from both field qualified for the finals.

== Schedule ==
All times are Myanmar Standard Time (UTC+06:30)

Date	Time	Event
Saturday, 14 December 2013	09:20	Heats
Saturday, 14 December 2013	18:43	Final

== Records ==
Prior to this competition, the existing world, Asian, and Southeast Asian Games records were as follows.

World Record	Michael Phelps (USA)	49.82	Rome, Italy	1 August 2009
Asian Record	Kohei Kawamoto (JPN)	51.00	Niigata, JPN	11 September 2009
Games Record	Hoang Quy Phuoc (VIE)	53.07	Palembang, Indonesia	13 November 2011

== Results ==
=== Heats ===
Rank	Heat	Lane	Athlete	Time	Notes
1	2	4	Joseph Schooling (SIN)	55.03	Q
2	1	3	Jessie Khing Lacuna (PHI)	56.09	Q
3	2	3	Supakrid Pananuratana (THA)	56.43	Q
4	1	4	Hoang Quy Phuoc (VIE)	56.69	Q
5	2	2	Kai Wee Rainer Ng (SIN)	56.81	Q
6	2	5	Glenn Victor Sutanto (INA)	56.90	Q
7	2	6	Siwat Matangkapong (THA)	56.91	Q
8	1	5	Triady Fauzi Sidiq (INA)	57.09	Q
9	1	6	Phan Lam Yen (VIE)	57.61	
10	1	2	Thiha Aung (MYA)	1:01.42	
11	1	7	Chamraen Youri Maximov (CAM)	1:05.28	
12	2	7	Nay Aung Linn (MYA)	1:05.82	
13	2	1	Ratha Phin (CAM)	1:09.88	
14	2	8	Sergey Sihanouvong (LAO)	1:10.43	
15	1	1	Saylom Souvannala (LAO)	1:10.50	

=== Final ===
Rank	Lane	Athlete	Time	Notes
1st place, gold medalist(s)	4	Joseph Schooling (SIN)	52.67	GR
2nd place, silver medalist(s)	8	Triady Fauzi Sidiq (INA)	53.14	
3rd place, bronze medalist(s)	7	Glenn Victor Sutanto (INA)	53.93	
4	6	Hoang Quy Phuoc (VIE)	54.63	
5	5	Jessie Khing Lacuna (PHI)	55.08	
6	3	Supakrid Pananuratana (THA)	55.99	
7	2	Kai Wee Rainer Ng (SIN)	56.18	
8	1	Siwat Matangkapong (THA)	56.24	
