= Shooting at the 2013 SEA Games – Women's 25 metre air pistol Team =

The Men's 25 metre air pistol Team event at the 2013 SEA Games took place on 16–17 December 2013 at the North Dagon Shooting Range in Yangon, Myanmar.

There were six teams of three shooters competed, the results of the team competition also served as qualification for individual competition, the top eight shooters qualified to individual final.

Each shooter fired 60 shots with a pistol at 25 metres distance. Scores for each shot were in increments of 1, with a maximum score of 10, all scores from three shooters per team combine to determine team scores. The first 30 shots were in the precision stage, with series of 5 shots being shot within 5 minutes. The second set of 30 shots gave shooters 3 seconds to take each shot.

== Schedule ==
All times are Myanmar Standard Time (UTC+06:30)

Date	Time	Event
Monday, 16 December 2013	09:00	Precision Stage
Tuesday, 17 December 2013	09:00	Rapid Fire Stage

== Results ==
Rank	Nation	Shooter	Score	Inner 10s	Notes
1st place, gold medalist(s)	Vietnam	Trieu Thi Hoa Hong (576); Nguyen Thuy Dung (571); Dang Le Ngoc Mai (559)	1706	40	
2nd place, silver medalist(s)	Singapore	Teo Shun Xie (576); Tan Ling Chiao Nicole (564); Teh Xiu Hong (559)	1699	34	
3rd place, bronze medalist(s)	Thailand	Naphaswan Yangpaiboon (579); Pattarasuda Sowsa Nga (562); Nerissa Yoksuwan (554)	1695	39	
4	Malaysia	Ng Pei Chin Bibiana (570); Siti Nur Masitah Mohd Badrin (567); Wahidah Ismail (553)	1690	47	
5	Myanmar	May Poe Wah (570); Khin Pa Pa Soe (560); Lay Zar Zar Hlaing Myint (545)	1675	32	
6	Laos	Phoutsady Phommachan (531); Lathtana Inthavong (507); Kongkham Bouasengphachanh (480)	1518	18	
