= Table tennis at the 2013 SEA Games – Men's singles =

The men's singles table tennis event was part of the table tennis programme and took place between December 20 and 21, at the Wunna Theikdi Indoor Stadium, Naypyidaw, Myanmar.

== Schedule ==
All times are Myanmar Standard Time (UTC+06:30)

Date	Time	Event
Friday, 20 December 2013	09:00	Preliminary round
Saturday, 21 December 2013	09:00	Semifinals
Saturday, 21 December 2013	11:00	Final

== Results ==
=== Preliminary round ===
==== Group A ====
Player	Pld	W	L	GF	GA	F-A	Pts
Le Tien Dat (VIE)	3	3	0	9	3	120-100	6
Ficky Supit Santoso (INA)	3	1	2	7	6	127-121	4
Kyi Than (MYA)	3	1	2	5	8	118-121	4
Thavisack Phathaphone (LAO)	3	1	2	3	7	86-109	4

Player 1	Score	Player 2
20 December 2013, 09:00
Ficky Supit Santoso (INA)	2:3 (4-11,11-4,5-11,11-9,9-11)	Kyi Than (MYA)
20 December 2013, 10:00
Thavisack Phathaphone (LAO)	0:3 (6-11,8-11,3-11)	Le Tien Dat (VIE)
20 December 2013, 11:00
Ficky Supit Santoso (INA)	2:3 (15-13,8-11,9-11,11-2,9-11)	Le Tien Dat (VIE)
20 December 2013, 14:00
Thavisack Phathaphone (LAO)	3:1 (11-9,6-11,11-9,14-12)	Kyi Than (MYA)
20 December 2013, 15:00
Kyi Than (MYA)	1:3 (7-11,11-6,6-11,7-11)	Le Tien Dat (VIE)
20 December 2013, 16:00
Ficky Supit Santoso (INA)	3:0 (12-10,12-10,11-7)	Thavisack Phathaphone (LAO)

==== Group B ====
Player	Pld	W	L	GF	GA	F-A	Pts
Zhan Jian (SIN)	3	3	0	9	0	99-45	6
Nguyen Van Ngoc (VIE)	3	2	1	6	3	84-73	5
Yon Mardi Yono (INA)	3	1	2	3	6	67-78	4
Tola Soeung (CAM)	3	0	3	0	9	47-101	3

Player 1	Score	Player 2
20 December 2013, 09:00
Zhan Jian (SIN)	3:0 (11-7,11-7,11-2)	Nguyen Van Ngoc (VIE)
20 December 2013, 10:00
Yon Mardi Yono (INA)	3:0 (11-4,11-6,11-2)	Tola Soeung (CAM)
20 December 2013, 11:00
Zhan Jian (SIN)	3:0 (11-2,11-4,11-7)	Tola Soeung (CAM)
20 December 2013, 14:00
Yon Mardi Yono (INA)	0:3 (9-11,5-11,4-11)	Nguyen Van Ngoc (VIE)
20 December 2013, 15:00
Nguyen Van Ngoc (VIE)	3:0 (11-3,13-11,11-8)	Tola Soeung (CAM)
20 December 2013, 16:00
Zhan Jian (SIN)	3:0 (11-3,11-7,11-6)	Yon Mardi Yono (INA)

==== Group C ====
Player	Pld	W	L	GF	GA	F-A	Pts
Clarence Chew (SIN)	3	3	0	9	4	134-106	6
Muhamad Ashraf Haiqal (MAS)	3	2	1	8	3	117-95	5
Nikom Wongsiri (THA)	3	1	2	5	6	106-110	4
Thet Ko Ko Latt (MYA)	3	0	3	0	9	54-100	3

Player 1	Score	Player 2
20 December 2013, 09:00
Clarence Chew (SIN)	3:0 (11-3,11-4,12-10)	Thet Ko Ko Latt (MYA)
20 December 2013, 10:00
Nikom Wongsiri (THA)	0:3 (10-12,10-12,11-13)	Muhamad Ashraf Haiqal (MAS)
20 December 2013, 11:00
Clarence Chew (SIN)	3:2 (9-11,11-7,6-11,11-9,11-9)	Muhamad Ashraf Haiqal (MAS)
20 December 2013, 14:00
Nikom Wongsiri (THA)	3:0 (11-9,11-7,11-5)	Thet Ko Ko Latt (MYA)
20 December 2013, 15:00
Thet Ko Ko Latt (MYA)	0:3 (6-11,6-11,4-11)	Muhamad Ashraf Haiqal (MAS)
20 December 2013, 16:00
Clarence Chew (SIN)	3:2 (11-4,10-12,11-5,8-11,12-10)	Nikom Wongsiri (THA)

==== Group D ====
Player	Pld	W	L	GF	GA	F-A	Pts
Richard Gonzales (PHI)	4	4	0	12	4	159-133	8
Muhd Shakirin Ibrahim (MAS)	3	3	1	11	5	160-138	7
Chaisit Chaitat (THA)	3	2	2	9	8	159-131	6
Sok Long Lim (CAM)	3	1	3	5	9	119-135	5
Phinith Kongphet (LAO)	3	0	4	1	12	81-141	4

Player 1	Score	Player 2
20 December 2013, 09:00
Muhd Shakirin Ibrahim (MAS)	2:3 (11-8,11-6,7-11,7-11,11-13)	Richard Gonzales (PHI)
20 December 2013, 09:30
Phinith Kongphet (LAO)	0:3 (8-11,7-11,7-11)	Sok Long Lim (CAM)
20 December 2013, 10:00
Chaisit Chaitat (THA)	1:3 (11-2,7-11,12-14,8-11)	Richard Gonzales (PHI)
20 December 2013, 11:00
Muhd Shakirin Ibrahim (MAS)	3:0 (11-5,11-5,14-12)	Phinith Kongphet (LAO)
20 December 2013, 11:30
Chaisit Chaitat (THA)	3:2 (11-6,10-12,11-4,3-11,11-6)	Sok Long Lim (CAM)
20 December 2013, 14:00
Phinith Kongphet (LAO)	1:3 (6-11,11-6,7-11,2-11)	Richard Gonzales (PHI)
20 December 2013, 15:00
Muhd Shakirin Ibrahim (MAS)	3:0 (11-7,12-10,11-8)	Sok Long Lim (CAM)
20 December 2013, 15:30
Chaisit Chaitat (THA)	3:0 (11-4,11-3,11-4)	Phinith Kongphet (LAO)
20 December 2013, 16:00
Sok Long Lim (CAM)	0:3 (8-11,6-11,8-11)	Richard Gonzales (PHI)
20 December 2013, 17:00
Chaisit Chaitat (THA)	2:3 (11-6,6-11,6-11,11-4,8-11)	Muhd Shakirin Ibrahim (MAS)

=== Knockout round ===
Semifinals								Final
A1	Le Tien Dat (VIE)	11	11	8	5	11	11
C1	Clarence Chew (SIN)	6	6	11	11	9	5	A1	Le Tien Dat (VIE)	6	8	7	4
D1	Richard Gonzales (PHI)	7	8	3	4			B1	Zhan Jian (SIN)	11	11	11	11
B1	Zhan Jian (SIN)	11	11	11	11
