= Athletics at the 2013 SEA Games – Men's long jump =

The men's long jump at the 2013 SEA Games, the athletics was held in Naypyidaw, Myanmar. The track and field events is taking place at the Wunna Theikdi Stadiumon December 15.

== Schedule ==
All times are Myanmar Standard Time (UTC+06:30)

Date	Time	Event
Sunday, 15 December 2013	14:00	Final

== Records ==
Prior to this competition, the existing world, Asian, and Southeast Asian Games records were as follows.

World Record	Mike Powell (USA)	8.95 m (+0.3 m/s)	Tokyo, Japan	30 August 1991
Asian Record	Mohamed Salman Al-Khuwalidi (KSA)	8.48 m (+0.6 m/s)	Sotteville, France	2 July 2006
Games Record	Henry Dagmil (PHI)	7.87 m	Nakhon Ratchasima, Thailand	10 December 2007

== Results ==
Legend

- X — Failure

Rank	Athlete	Attempts						Result	Notes
Rank	Athlete	1	2	3	4	5	6	Result	Notes
1st place, gold medalist(s)	Henry Dagmil (PHI)	?	?	?	?	?	?	7.80	
2nd place, silver medalist(s)	Supanara Sukhasvasti na Ayudhaya (THA)	?	?	?	?	?	?	7.71	
3rd place, bronze medalist(s)	Pham Van Lam (VIE)	?	?	?	?	?	?	7.53	
4	Benigno Marayag (PHI)	?	?	?	?	?	?	7.38	
5	Nguyen Van Mua (VIE)	?	?	?	?	?	?	7.35	
6	Atthapol Prajammoon (THA)	?	?	?	?	?	?	6.99	
7	Sompong Vongphakdy (LAO)	?	?	?	?	?	?	6.96	
8	Htun Latt (MYA)	?	?	?	?	?	?	6.68	
9	Kyaw Htet Aung (MYA)	?	?	?	?	?	?	6.48	
