= Table tennis at the 2013 SEA Games – Women's singles =

The women's singles table tennis event was part of the table tennis programme and took place between 20 and 21 December, at the Wunna Theikdi Indoor Stadium, Naypyidaw, Myanmar.

== Schedule ==
All times are Myanmar Standard Time (UTC+06:30)

Date	Time	Event
Friday, 20 December 2013	09:30	Preliminary round
Saturday, 21 December 2013	09:00	Semifinals
Saturday, 21 December 2013	11:00	Final

== Results ==
=== Preliminary round ===
==== Group W ====
Player	Pld	W	L	GF	GA	F-A	Pts
Isabelle Li Siyun (SIN)	2	2	0	6	2	84-56	4
Ian Lariba (PHI)	2	1	1	5	3	75-72	3
Ying Ho (MAS)	2	0	2	0	6	35-66	2

Player 1	Score	Player 2
20 December 2013, 10:30
Isabelle Li Siyun (SIN)	3:0 (11-6,11-6,11-2)	Ying Ho (MAS)
20 December 2013, 14:30
Ian Lariba (PHI)	3:0 (11-5,11-8,11-8)	Ying Ho (MAS)
20 December 2013, 16:30
Isabelle Li Siyun (SIN)	3:2 (11-4,8-11,11-8,10-12,11-7)	Ian Lariba (PHI)

==== Group X ====
Player	Pld	W	L	GF	GA	F-A	Pts
Hoang My Trang Mai (VIE)	3	3	0	9	0	99-53	6
Widya Wulansari (INA)	3	2	1	6	4	91-79	5
Southammavong Thiphakone (LAO)	3	1	2	3	7	75-101	4
Swe Swe Han (MYA)	3	0	3	2	9	84-116	3

Player 1	Score	Player 2
20 December 2013, 09:30
Hoang My Trang Mai (VIE)	3:0 (11-6,11-6,11-7)	Swe Swe Han (MYA)
20 December 2013, 10:30
Southammavong Thiphakone (LAO)	0:3 (9-11,1-11,6-11)	Widya Wulansari (INA)
20 December 2013, 11:30
Hoang My Trang Mai (VIE)	3:0 (11-2,11-7,11-7)	Widya Wulansari (INA)
20 December 2013, 14:30
Southammavong Thiphakone (LAO)	3:1 (11-6,11-8,7-11,12-10)	Swe Swe Han (MYA)
20 December 2013, 15:30
Swe Swe Han (MYA)	1:3 (7-11,11-9,4-11,8-11)	Widya Wulansari (INA)
20 December 2013, 16:30
Hoang My Trang Mai (VIE)	3:0 (11-5,11-4,11-9)	Southammavong Thiphakone (LAO)

==== Group Y ====
Player	Pld	W	L	GF	GA	F-A	Pts
Yu Mengyu (SIN)	3	3	0	9	0	100-48	6
Muangsuk Anisara (THA)	3	2	1	6	5	99-98	5
Thi Nga Nguyen (VIE)	3	1	2	5	6	101-107	4
Stella Priska Palit (INA)	3	0	3	0	9	52-99	3

Player 1	Score	Player 2
20 December 2013, 09:30
Yu Mengyu (SIN)	3:0 (11-2,11-5,11-3)	Stella Priska Palit (INA)
20 December 2013, 10:30
Muangsuk Anisara (THA)	3:2 (12-14,11-5,6-11,11-6,11-9)	Thi Nga Nguyen (VIE)
20 December 2013, 11:30
Yu Mengyu (SIN)	3:0 (11-5,11-8,12-10)	Thi Nga Nguyen (VIE)
20 December 2013, 14:30
Muangsuk Anisara (THA)	3:0 (11-5,11-6,11-9)	Stella Priska Palit (INA)
20 December 2013, 15:30
Stella Priska Palit (INA)	0:3 (9-11,6-11,7-11)	Thi Nga Nguyen (VIE)
20 December 2013, 16:30
Yu Mengyu (SIN)	3:0 (11-7,11-5,11-3)	Muangsuk Anisara (THA)

==== Group Z ====
Player	Pld	W	L	GF	GA	F-A	Pts
Lee Wei Beh (MAS)	3	3	0	9	0	99-51	6
Komwong Nanthana (THA)	3	2	1	6	3	87-63	5
Douangpanya Seangdavieng (LAO)	3	1	2	3	6	72-90	4
Aye Myat Thu (MYA)	3	0	3	0	9	45-99	3

Player 1	Score	Player 2
20 December 2013, 09:30
Komwong Nanthana (THA)	3:0 (11-1,11-4,11-6)	Aye Myat Thu (MYA)
20 December 2013, 10:30
Lee Wei Beh (MAS)	3:0 (11-3,11-8,11-9)	Douangpanya Seangdavieng (LAO)
20 December 2013, 11:30
Komwong Nanthana (THA)	3:0 (11-7,11-7,11-5)	Douangpanya Seangdavieng (LAO)
20 December 2013, 14:30
Lee Wei Beh (MAS)	3:0 (11-2,11-4,11-4)	Aye Myat Thu (MYA)
20 December 2013, 15:30
Aye Myat Thu (MYA)	0:3 (9-11,6-11,9-11)	Douangpanya Seangdavieng (LAO)
20 December 2013, 16:30
Komwong Nanthana (THA)	0:3 (6-11,8-11,7-11)	Lee Wei Beh (MAS)

=== Knockout round ===
Semifinals									Final
W1	Isabelle Li Siyun (SIN)	11	14	11	11
Z1	Lee Wei Beh (MAS)	9	12	3	9				W1	Isabelle Li Siyun (SIN)	8	4	6	6
Y1	Yu Mengyu (SIN)	11	11	8	11	7	7	11	Y1	Yu Mengyu (SIN)	11	11	11	11
X1	Hoang My Trang Mai (VIE)	5	6	11	9	11	11	5
