= Equestrian at the 2013 SEA Games – Team jumping =

Team jumping equestrian at the 2013 Southeast Asian Games was held in Wunna Theikdi Equestrian Field, Naypyidaw, Myanmar on December 17, 2013.

== Schedule ==
All times are Myanmar Standard Time (UTC+06:30)

Date	Time	Event
Tuesday, 17 December 2013	09:00	1st round
Tuesday, 17 December 2013	11:05	2nd round

== Results ==
Legend

- RT — Retired
- EL — Eliminated
- WD — Withdrawn
- NS — Not Started
- Pen — Penalties

Rank	Team	Rounds		Total
Rank	Team	1st	2nd	Total
1st place, gold medalist(s)	Indonesia (INA)	8	12	20
	Jendry Palandeng on Gunderman	0	0	
	Asep Lesmana on Sein Than Sint	~~21~~	~~12~~	
	Pingkan Motria on Billy	4	8	
	Andry Prasetyono on Fast Track	4	4	
2nd place, silver medalist(s)	Myanmar (MYA)	8	16	24
	Tun Aung Phyo on Breeze	8	4	
	Aung Thu Tun on Charrua	~~16~~	~~12~~	
	Zaw Wai on You Bet I Bite	0	4	
	Saw Maung on Oscar Royal	0	8	
3rd place, bronze medalist(s)	Thailand (THA)	12	16	28
	Siengsaw Letratanachai on Rolex	4	8	
	Jaruporn Limpichati on Just A Snip	0	0	
	Supanut Wannakool on Kinnordy Gyuana	8	8	
	Supap Khaw-Ngam on King	~~12~~	~~12~~	
4	Malaysia (MAS)	8	24	32
	Yap Jun Xian on Front N Center	4	4	
	Edric Lee Chin Hon on Cooper	4	12	
	Izad Rushdi Paiza on Htate Kwat	~~8~~	~~18~~	
	Shooreandran Nagaswara on Perfecting Ruby	0	8	
5	Cambodia (CAM)	8	24	32
	Sovanchandara Ly on Sir Jerico	8	12	
	Soth Puthminea on Weblands Rupert	2	8	
	Narith Sim on CP Orego	6	6	
	Makara Phat on Sein Win Bo	~~EL~~	~~WD~~	
6	Singapore (SIN)	28	17	45
	Janine Khoo on CP Safari	0	0	
	Catherine Chew on Ruby	8	8	
	Predrag Marjanovic on Kick N Kenny	20	~~12~~	
	Cheong Su Yen on Just Kel	~~EL~~	9	
—	Philippines (PHI)	EL	EL	EL
	Camila Lastrilla on Tommy Gun	4	0	
	Diego Virata on It's Mine	4	4	
	Andrea Belofsky on Bagan Minthamee	~~EL~~	~~EL~~	
