= Athletics at the 2013 SEA Games – Women's 400 metres hurdles =

The women's 400 metres hurdles at the 2013 SEA Games, as part of the athletics program, was held in Naypyidaw, Myanmar. The track and field event took place at the Wunna Theikdi Stadiumon December 17.

== Schedule ==
All times are Myanmar Standard Time (UTC+06:30)

Date	Time	Event
Tuesday, 17 December 2013	15:20	Final

== Records ==
Prior to this competition, the existing world, Asian, and Southeast Asian Games records were as follows.

World Record	Yuliya Pechonkina (RUS)	52.34	Tula, Russia	8 August 2003
Asian Record	Han Qing (CHN); Song Yinglan (CHN)	53.96	Beijing, China; Guangzhou, China	9 September 1993; 22 November 2001
Games Record	Reawadee Srithao (THA)	56.78	Manila, Philippines	2 December 1991

== Results ==
Rank	Lane	Athlete	Time	Notes
1st place, gold medalist(s)	5	Wassana Winatho (THA)	58.85	
2nd place, silver medalist(s)	6	Quach Thi Lan (VIE)	58.93	
3rd place, bronze medalist(s)	7	Dipna Lim Prasad (SIN)	59.96	NR
4	3	Panida Rattanachan (THA)	01:03.87	
5	2	Tin Zar Moe (MYA)	01:11.40	
—	4	Nguyen Thi Huyen (VIE)	DNS	
