= Athletics at the 2013 SEA Games – Men's 3000 metres steeplechase =

The men's metres steeplechase, at the 2013 SEA Games, was part of the athletics events held in Naypyidaw, Myanmar. The track and field event took place at the Wunna Theikdi Stadiumon December 18.

== Schedule ==
All times are Myanmar Standard Time (UTC+06:30)

Date	Time	Event
Wednesday, 18 December 2013	15:30	Final

== Records ==
Prior to this competition, the existing world, Asian, and Southeast Asian Games records were as follows.

World Record	Saif Saaeed Shaheen (QAT)	7:53.63	Brussels, Belgium	3 September 2004
Asian Record	Saif Saaeed Shaheen (QAT)	7:53.63	Brussels, Belgium	3 September 2004
Games Record	Eduardo Buenavista (PHI)	8:40.77	Kuala Lumpur, Malaysia	12 December 2001

== Results ==
Rank	Athlete	Time	Notes
1st place, gold medalist(s)	Christopher Jr Ulboc (PHI)	09:01.59	
2nd place, silver medalist(s)	Pham Tien San (VIE)	09:02.50	
3rd place, bronze medalist(s)	Patikarn Pechsricha (THA)	09:04.04	
4	Rene Herrera (PHI)	09:09.14	
5	Muhammad Al Quraisy (INA)	09:23.07	
6	Le Trong Giang (VIE)	09:50.02	
7	Mar Kaut (MYA)	09:53.51	
8	Ribeiro Pinto De Carvalho (TLS)	10:03.41	
9	Chan Myae Aung (MYA)	11:23.38	
