= Shooting at the 2013 SEA Games – Women's 25 metre air pistol =

The Women's 25 metre air pistol event at the 2013 SEA Games took place on 16–17 December 2013 at the North Dagon Shooting Range in Yangon, Myanmar.

The event consisted of three rounds: a qualifier, a semifinal and a final. In the qualifier, each shooter fired 60 shots with a pistol at 25 metres distance. Scores for each shot were in increments of 1, with a maximum score of 10. The first 30 shots were in the precision stage, with series of 5 shots being shot within 5 minutes. The second set of 30 shots gave shooters 3 seconds to take each shot.

The top 8 shooters in the qualifying round advanced on to the semifinal round. After semifinal the highest two rank shooters advanced to the Final round and the 3rd and 4th rank competed in medal bronze round.

== Schedule ==
All times are Myanmar Standard Time (UTC+06:30)

Date	Time	Event
Monday, 16 December 2013	09:00	Precision Stage
Tuesday, 17 December 2013	09:00	Rapid Fire Stage
Tuesday, 17 December 2013	11:30	Semifinal and Final

== Qualification round ==
Rank	Athlete	Country	1	2	3	PR	4	5	6	RF	Total	Inner 10s	Notes
1	Naphaswan Yangpaiboon	Thailand	97	96	95	288	96	99	96	291	579	22	Q
2	Trieu Thi Hoa Hong	Vietnam	93	96	96	285	97	97	97	291	576	15	Q
3	Teo Shun Xie	Singapore	94	98	96	288	95	96	97	288	576	15	Q
4	Nguyen Thuy Dung	Vietnam	95	94	94	283	96	95	97	288	571	15	Q
5	May Poe Wah	Myanmar	95	91	96	282	98	95	95	288	570	18	Q
6	Ng Pei Chin Bibiana	Malaysia	96	94	96	286	93	96	95	284	570	17	Q
7	Siti Nur Masitah Mohd Badrin	Malaysia	96	94	89	279	98	96	94	288	567	18	Q
8	Tan Ling Chiao Nicole	Singapore	94	96	97	287	91	92	94	277	564	10	Q
9	Pattarasuda Sowsa Nga	Thailand	93	91	89	273	96	99	94	289	562	7	
10	Khin Pa Pa Soe	Myanmar	91	93	93	277	97	94	92	283	560	8	
11	Dang Le Ngoc Mai	Vietnam	93	95	90	278	95	98	88	281	559	10	
12	Teh Xiu Hong	Singapore	94	94	95	283	93	91	92	276	559	9	
13	Nerissa Yoksuwan	Thailand	94	95	93	282	88	93	91	272	554	10	
14	Wahidah Ismail	Malaysia	89	90	93	272	96	90	95	281	553	12	
15	Lay Zar Zar Hlaing Myint	Myanmar	87	94	93	274	89	90	92	271	545	6	
16	Phoutsady Phommachan	Laos	88	91	92	271	87	87	86	260	531	7	
17	Lathtana Inthavong	Laos	82	81	82	245	86	91	85	262	507	5	
18	Kongkham Bouasengphachanh	Laos	87	85	88	260	84	91	45	220	480	6	

== Final ==
Legend

- QG — Qualified for Gold Medal
- QB — Qualified for Bronze Medal
- SO — Athlete eliminated by Shoot-off for tie

=== 1st Competition Stage - Semifinal ===
Rank	Athlete	Country	1	2	3	4	5	Total	Notes
1	Siti Nur Masitah Mohd Badrin	Malaysia	2	1	3	3	2	11	QG
2	Tan Ling Chiao Nicole	Singapore	2	3	1	2	2	10	S-off:3, QG
3	Trieu Thi Hoa Hong	Vietnam	1	1	3	1	2	10	S-off:2, QB
4	Ng Pei Chin Bibiana	Malaysia	3	1	2	1	3	10	S-off:0, QB
5	Naphaswan Yangpaiboon	Thailand	1	0	2	3	3	9	
6	Nguyen Thuy Dung	Vietnam	0	4	1	3	1	9	
7	May Poe Wah	Myanmar	1	1	2	1	3	8	
8	Teo Shun Xie	Singapore	0	2	3	1	0	6	

=== 2nd Competition Stage - Medal Matches ===
Rank	Athlete	Country	1	2	3	4	5	6	7	8	Total	Notes
1st place, gold medalist(s)	Tan Ling Chiao Nicole	Singapore	1	2	0	2	0	2			7	
2nd place, silver medalist(s)	Siti Nur Masitah Mohd Badrin	Malaysia	1	0	2	0	2	0			5	
3rd place, bronze medalist(s)	Trieu Thi Hoa Hong	Vietnam	0	2	0	1	2	1	1	2	9	
4	Ng Pei Chin Bibiana	Malaysia	2	0	2	1	0	1	1	0	7	
