= Athletics at the 2013 SEA Games – Men's decathlon =

The men's decathlon at the 2013 SEA Games, the athletics was held in Naypyidaw, Myanmar. The track and field events took place at the Wunna Theikdi Stadiumon December 17–18 .

== Schedule ==
All times are Myanmar Standard Time (UTC+06:30)

Date	Time	Event
Tuesday, 17 December 2013	09:05	100 metres
Tuesday, 17 December 2013	10:00	Long jump
Tuesday, 17 December 2013	11:15	Shot put
Tuesday, 17 December 2013	15:00	High jump
Tuesday, 17 December 2013	16:35	400 metres
Wednesday, 18 December 2013	08:30	110 metres hurdles
Wednesday, 18 December 2013	09:10	Discus throw
Wednesday, 18 December 2013	10:15	Pole vault
Wednesday, 18 December 2013	14:30	Javelin throw
Wednesday, 18 December 2013	17:00	1500 metres

== Records ==
Prior to this competition, the existing world, Asian, and Southeast Asian Games records were as follows.

World Record	Ashton Eaton (USA)	9038 pts	Eugene, Oregon, United States	22–23 August 2012
Asian Record	Dmitriy Karpov (KAZ)	8725 pts	Athens, Greece	23–24 August 2004
Games Record	Vu Van Huyen (VIE)	7558 pts	Vientiane, Laos	13–14 December 2009

== Results ==
Legend

- – — Pass
- O — Clearance
- X — Failure
- DNF — Did not finish
- DNS — Did not start

=== 100 metres ===
- Wind : -0.6 m/s

Rank	Lane	Athlete	Time	Points	Notes
1	6	Jesson Ramil Cid (PHI)	10.85	894	
2	2	Zakaria Malik (INA)	11.14	830	
3	5	Nguyen Van Hue (VIE)	11.26	804	
4	7	Nguyen Van Dat (VIE)	11.36	782	
5	4	Porranot Purahong (THA)	11.55	742	
6	3	Myat Soe Thu (MYA)	11.72	707	
7	8	Htun Latt (MYA)	11.76	699	

=== Long jump ===
Rank	Athlete	Attempts			Result	Points	Notes
Rank	Athlete	1	2	3	Result	Points	Notes
1	Nguyen Van Hue (VIE)	?	?	?	7.09	835	
2	Jesson Ramil Cid (PHI)	?	?	?	7.03	821	
3	Nguyen Van Dat (VIE)	?	?	?	6.89	788	
4	Zakaria Malik (INA)	?	?	?	6.61	723	
5	Porranot Purahong (THA)	?	?	?	6.10	608	
6	Myat Soe Thu (MYA)	?	?	?	5.58	498	
7	Htun Latt (MYA)	?	?	?	NM	0	

=== Shot put ===
Rank	Athlete	Attempts			Result	Points	Notes
Rank	Athlete	1	2	3	Result	Points	Notes
1	Zakaria Malik (INA)	?	?	?	12.15	616	
2	Jesson Ramil Cid (PHI)	?	?	?	11.54	579	
3	Htun Latt (MYA)	?	?	?	11.46	574	
4	Nguyen Van Hue (VIE)	?	?	?	11.22	559	
5	Nguyen Van Dat (VIE)	?	?	?	10.56	519	
6	Porranot Purahong (THA)	?	?	?	7.52	338	
7	Myat Soe Thu (MYA)	?	?	?	7.50	337	

=== High jump ===
Rank	Athlete	Result	Points	Notes
1	Jesson Ramil Cid (PHI)	1.86	683	
2	Zakaria Malik (INA)	1.86	683	
3	Nguyen Van Dat (VIE)	1.83	657	
4	Nguyen Van Hue (VIE)	1.74	581	
5	Myat Soe Thu (MYA)	1.68	531	
6	Porranot Purahong (THA)	1.65	507	
7	Htun Latt (MYA)	1.65	507	

=== 400 metres ===
Rank	Lane	Athlete	Time	Points	Notes
1	3	Jesson Ramil Cid (PHI)	48.37	891	
2	6	Zakaria Malik (INA)	50.26	803	
3	7	Nguyen Van Hue (VIE)	52.63	697	
4	5	Nguyen Van Dat (VIE)	52.69	695	
5	6	Htun Latt (MYA)	55.76	569	
6	7	Myat Soe Thu (MYA)	56.36	545	
7	4	Porranot Purahong (THA)	01:00.15	408	

=== 110 metres hurdles ===
- Wind : -0.3 m/s

Rank	Heat	Lane	Athlete	Time	Points	Notes
1	1	4	Zakaria Malik (INA)	15.09	839	
2	2	6	Jesson Ramil Cid (PHI)	15.26	818	
3	2	3	Nguyen Van Hue (VIE)	15.53	787	
4	1	5	Nguyen Van Dat (VIE)	15.96	737	
5	2	4	Htun Latt (MYA)	17.12	612	
6	2	7	Myat Soe Thu (MYA)	18.01	523	
—	1	3	Porranot Purahong (THA)	DNF	0	

=== Discus throw ===
Rank	Athlete	Attempts			Result	Points	Notes
Rank	Athlete	1	2	3	Result	Points	Notes
1	Nguyen Van Dat (VIE)	?	?	?	34.58	555	
2	Zakaria Malik (INA)	?	?	?	31.45	493	
3	Htun Latt (MYA)	?	?	?	31.35	491	
4	Jesson Ramil Cid (PHI)	?	?	?	31.14	487	
5	Nguyen Van Hue (VIE)	?	?	?	31.07	486	
6	Myat Soe Thu (MYA)	?	?	?	24.10	350	
7	Porranot Purahong (THA)	?	?	?	16.63	210	

=== Pole vault ===
Rank	Athlete	Result	Points	Notes
1	Porranot Purahong (THA)	4.90	880	
2	Nguyen Van Dat (VIE)	4.30	702	
3	Zakaria Malik (INA)	4.20	674	
4	Myat Soe Thu (MYA)	4.10	645	
5	Jesson Ramil Cid (PHI)	3.90	590	
6	Htun Latt (MYA)	3.70	536	
—	Nguyen Van Hue (VIE)		0	

=== Javelin throw ===
Rank	Athlete	Attempts			Result	Points	Notes
Rank	Athlete	1	2	3	Result	Points	Notes
1	Jesson Ramil Cid (PHI)	?	?	?	48.98	574	
2	Zakaria Malik (INA)	?	?	?	48.93	573	
3	Htun Latt (MYA)	?	?	?	42.17	474	
4	Nguyen Van Dat (VIE)	?	?	?	41.95	470	
5	Myat Soe Thu (MYA)	?	?	?	41.49	464	
—	Porranot Purahong (THA)				DNS	0	
—	Nguyen Van Hue (VIE)				DNS	0	

=== 1500 metres ===
Rank	Athlete	Time	Points	Notes
1	Jesson Ramil Cid (PHI)	04:36.10	705	
2	Zakaria Malik (INA)	05:13.95	482	
3	Nguyen Van Dat (VIE)	05:14.01	477	
4	Myat Soe Thu (MYA)	05:33.02	385	
5	Htun Latt (MYA)	05:52.52	295	

=== Summary ===
Rank	Athlete	100m	LJ	SP	HJ	400m	110mH	DT	PV	JT	1500m	Total	Notes
1st place, gold medalist(s)	Jesson Ramil Cid (PHI)	894	821	579	683	891	818	487	590	574	705	7038	NR
2nd place, silver medalist(s)	Zakaria Malik (INA)	830	723	616	683	803	839	493	674	573	482	6711	
3rd place, bronze medalist(s)	Nguyen Van Dat (VIE)	782	788	519	657	695	737	555	702	470	477	6383	
4	Myat Soe Thu (MYA)	707	498	337	531	545	523	350	645	464	385	4982	
5	Htun Latt (MYA)	699	0	574	507	569	612	491	536	474	295	4753	
—	Nguyen Van Hue (VIE)	804	835	559	581	697	787	486	0	DNS		DNF	
—	Porranot Purahong (THA)	742 0	608	338	507	408	0	210	880	DNS		DNF	
