= Equestrian at the 2013 SEA Games – Individual jumping =

Individual jumping equestrian at the 2013 Southeast Asian Games was held in Wunna Theikdi Equestrian Field, Naypyidaw, Myanmar on December 18, 2013.

== Schedule ==
All times are Myanmar Standard Time (UTC+06:30)

Date	Time	Event
Tuesday, 17 December 2013	09:00	1st round
Tuesday, 17 December 2013	11:05	2nd round
Wednesday, 18 December 2013	09:00	Final 1st round
Wednesday, 18 December 2013	11:10	Final 2nd round

== Results ==
Legend

- RT — Retired
- EL — Eliminated
- WD — Withdrawn
- NS — Not Started
- Pen — Penalties

=== Qualifier ===
Rank	Athlete	Horse	1st qualifier			2nd qualifier			Total
Rank	Athlete	Horse	Jump	Time	Total	Jump	Time	Total	Total
1	Janine Khoo (SIN)	CP Safari	0	0	0	0	0	0	0
1	Jendry Palandeng (INA)	Gunderman	0	0	0	0	0	0	0
1	Jaruporn Limpichati (THA)	Just a Snip	0	0	0	0	0	0	0
4	Camila Lastrilla (PHI)	Tommy Gun	4	0	4	0	0	0	4
4	Zaw Wai (MYA)	You Bet I Bite	0	0	0	4	0	4	4
6	Yap Jun Xian (MAS)	Front N Center	4	0	4	4	0	4	8
6	Diego Virata (PHI)	It's Mine	4	0	4	4	0	4	8
6	Andry Prasetyono (INA)	Fast Track	4	0	4	4	0	4	8
6	Saw Maung (MYA)	Oscar Royal	0	0	0	8	0	8	8
6	Shooreandran Nagaswara (MAS)	Perfecting Ruby	0	0	0	8	0	8	8
11	Soth Puthminea (CAM)	Weblands Rupert	0	2	2	8	0	8	10
12	Siengsaw Letratanachai (THA)	Rolex	4	0	4	8	0	8	12
12	Tun Aung Phyo (MYA)	Breeze	8	0	8	4	0	4	12
12	Narith Sim (CAM)	CP Orego	4	2	6	4	2	6	12
12	Pingkan Motria (INA)	Billy	4	0	4	8	0	8	12
16	Catherine Chew (SIN)	Ruby	8	0	8	8	0	8	16
16	Edric Lee Chin Hon (MAS)	Cooper	4	0	4	12	0	12	16
16	Supanut Wannakool (THA)	Kinnordy Gyuana	8	0	8	8	0	8	16
19	Sovanchandara Ly (CAM)	Sir Jerico	8	0	8	12	0	12	20
20	Supap Khaw-Ngam (THA)	King	12	0	12	12	0	12	24
21	Izad Rushdi Paiza (MAS)	Htate Kwat	8	0	8	12	6	18	26
22	Aung Thu Tun (MYA)	Charrua	16	0	16	12	0	12	28
23	Predrag Marjanovic (SIN)	Kick N Kenny	20	0	20	12	0	12	32
24	Asep Lesmana (INA)	Sein Than Sint	20	1	21	12	0	12	33
—	Andrea Belofsky (PHI)	Bagan Minthamee			EL			EL	EL
—	Cheong Su Yen (SIN)	Just Kel			EL	8	1	9	EL
—	Makara Phat (CAM)	Sein Win Bo			EL			WD	EL

=== Final ===
Rank	Athlete	Horse	1st qualifier			2nd qualifier			Total	Jump-off	
Rank	Athlete	Horse	Jump	Time	Total	Jump	Time	Total	Total	Pen.	Time
1st place, gold medalist(s)	Janine Khoo (SIN)	CP Safari	0	0	0	0	0	0	0		
2nd place, silver medalist(s)	Jaruporn Limpichati (THA)	Just a Snip	4	0	4	0	0	0	4	4	44.04
3rd place, bronze medalist(s)	Jendry Palandeng (INA)	Gunderman	0	0	0	4	0	4	4	4	45.84
4	Catherine Chew (SIN)	Ruby	0	1	1	4	1	5	6		
5	Shoorendran Nagaswaran (MYA)	Perfecting Ruby	4	0	4	4	0	4	8		
5	Siengsaw Letratanachai (THA)	Rolex	4	0	4	4	0	4	8		
7	Narith Sim (CAM)	CP Orego	8	1	9	0	0	0	9		
8	Diego Virata (PHI)	It's Mine	0	0	0	8	3	11	11		
9	Edric Lee Chin Hon (MAS)	Cooper	8	0	8	4	0	4	12		
9	Soth Puthminea (CAM)	Weblands Rupert	4	0	4	8	0	8	12		
11	Pingkan Motria (INA)	Billy	4	0	4	12	0	12	16		
12	Saw Maung (MYA)	Oscar Royal	8	0	8	12	0	12	20		
13	Camila Lastrilla (PHI)	Tommy Gun	12	1	13	8	0	8	21		
14	Tun Aung Phyo (MYA)	Breeze	20	0	20	4	0	4	24		
