= Athletics at the 2013 SEA Games – Men's 5000 metres =

The men's 5000 metres, at the 2013 SEA Games, was part of the athletics events held in Naypyidaw, Myanmar. The track and field event took place at the Wunna Theikdi Stadiumon December 17.

== Schedule ==
All times are Myanmar Standard Time (UTC+06:30)

Date	Time	Event
Tuesday, 17 December 2013	08:40	Final

== Records ==
Prior to this competition, the existing world, Asian, and Southeast Asian Games records were as follows.

World Record	Kenenisa Bekele (ETH)	12:37.35	Hengelo, Netherlands	31 May 2004
Asian Record	Rop Albert (BRN)	12:51.96	Fontvieille, Monaco	19 July 2013
Games Record	Murusamy Ramachandran (MAS)	14:08.97	Singapore	15 June 1993

== Results ==
Rank	Athlete	Time	Notes
1st place, gold medalist(s)	Nguyen Van Lai (VIE)	14:19.35	NR
2nd place, silver medalist(s)	Boonthung Srisung (THA)	14:21.75	
3rd place, bronze medalist(s)	Ridwan Ridwan (INA)	14:27.69	
4	Sanchai Namkhet (THA)	14:42.36	
5	Agus Prayogo (INA)	14:51.91	
6	Soe Min Thu (MYA)	15:05.94	
7	Maung Chat (MYA)	15:50.27	
