= Athletics at the 2013 SEA Games – Women's 1500 metres =

The women's 1500 metres at the 2013 SEA Games, was part of the athletics events held in Naypyidaw, Myanmar. The track and field event took place at the Wunna Theikdi Stadium on December 19.

== Schedule ==
All times are Myanmar Standard Time (UTC+06:30)

Date	Time	Event
Thursday, 19 December 2013	15:50	Final

== Records ==
Prior to this competition, the existing world, Asian, and Southeast Asian Games records were as follows.

World Record	Qu Yunxia (CHN)	3:50.46	Beijing, China	11 September 1993
Asian Record	Qu Yunxia (CHN)	3:50.46	Beijing, China	11 September 1993
Games Record	Hang Truong Thanh (VIE)	4:11.60	Nakhon Ratchasima, Thailand	7 December 2007

== Results ==
Legend

Rank	Athlete	Time	Notes
1st place, gold medalist(s)	Do Thi Thao (VIE)	4:22.64	
2nd place, silver medalist(s)	Phyu War Thet (MYA)	4:27.01	
3rd place, bronze medalist(s)	Than Toe Khin Myo Aung (MYA)	4:32.33	
4	Jessica Barnard (PHI)	4:42.31	
—	Nguyen Thi Phuong (VIE)	DNS	
