= Athletics at the 2013 SEA Games – Women's heptathlon =

The women's heptathlon at the 2013 SEA Games, the athletics was held in Naypyidaw, Myanmar. The track and field events took place at the Wunna Theikdi Stadiumon December 15–16 .

== Schedule ==
All times are Myanmar Standard Time (UTC+06:30)

Date	Time	Event
Sunday, 15 December 2013	09:30	100 metres hurdles
Sunday, 15 December 2013	10:30	High jump
Sunday, 15 December 2013	14:30	Shot put
Sunday, 15 December 2013	16:45	200 metres
Monday, 16 December 2013	10:00	Long jump
Monday, 16 December 2013	14:00	Javelin throw
Monday, 16 December 2013	16:10	800 metres

== Records ==
Prior to this competition, the existing world, Asian, and Southeast Asian Games records were as follows.

World Record	Jackie Joyner-Kersee (USA)	7291 pts	Seoul, South Korea	23–24 September 1988
Asian Record	Ghada Shouaa (SYR)	6942 pts	Götzis, Austria	26 May 1996
Games Record	Wassana Winatho (THA)	5889 pts	Nakhon Ratchasima, Thailand	11 December 2007

== Results ==
Legend

- – — Pass
- O — Clearance
- X — Failure
- DNF — Did not finish
- DNS — Did not start

=== 100 metres hurdles ===
- Wind: +0.2 m/s

Rank	Lane	Athlete	Time	Points	Notes
1	2	Wassana Winatho (THA)	13.75	1014	
2	4	Narcisa Atienza (PHI)	14.82	866	
3	3	Sunisa Khotseemueang (THA)	14.83	864	
4	6	Chaw Chaw (MYA)	16.94	603	
5	7	Naw Yee Yee Than (MYA)	17.15	580	

=== High jump ===
Rank	Athlete	Result	Points	Notes
1	Wassana Winatho (THA)	1.79	966	
2	Narcisa Atienza (PHI)	1.76	928	
3	Sunisa Khotseemueang (THA)	1.64	783	
4	Naw Yee Yee Than (MYA)	1.41	523	
5	Chaw Chaw (MYA)	1.38	491	

=== Shot put ===
Rank	Athlete	Attempts			Result	Points	Notes
Rank	Athlete	1	2	3	Result	Points	Notes
1	Narcisa Atienza (PHI)	?	?	?	12.57	699	
2	Wassana Winatho (THA)	?	?	?	12.28	680	
3	Sunisa Khotseemueang (THA)	?	?	?	11.82	649	
4	Naw Yee Yee Than (MYA)	?	?	?	9.89	522	
5	Chaw Chaw (MYA)	?	?	?	7.86	390	

=== 200 metres ===
- Wind: -0.5 m/s

Rank	Lane	Athlete	Time	Points	Notes
1	4	Wassana Winatho (THA)	25.05	882	
2	2	Sunisa Khotseemueang (THA)	25.86	809	
3	7	Narcisa Atienza (PHI)	26.59	746	
4	5	Naw Yee Yee Than (MYA)	27.63	660	
5	6	Chaw Chaw (MYA)	27.91	638	

=== Long jump ===
Rank	Athlete	Attempts			Result	Points	Notes
Rank	Athlete	1	2	3	Result	Points	Notes
1	Wassana Winatho (THA)	?	?	?	5.65	744	
2	Sunisa Khotseemueang (THA)	?	?	?	5.59	726	
3	Narcisa Atienza (PHI)	?	?	?	5.51	703	
4	Chaw Chaw (MYA)	?	?	?	4.86	522	
5	Naw Yee Yee Than (MYA)	?	?	?	4.78	500	

=== Javelin throw ===
Rank	Athlete	Attempts			Result	Points	Notes
Rank	Athlete	1	2	3	Result	Points	Notes
1	Sunisa Khotseemueang (THA)	?	?	?	42.36	713	
2	Narcisa Atienza (PHI)	?	?	?	42.27	711	
3	Wassana Winatho (THA)	?	?	?	39.67	661	
4	Naw Yee Yee Than (MYA)	?	?	?	29.69	471	
5	Chaw Chaw (MYA)	?	?	?	26.71	414	

=== 800 metres ===
Rank	Athlete	Time	Points	Notes
1	Wassana Winatho (THA)}	02:36.86	609	
2	Sunisa Khotseemueang (THA)	02:36.99	608	
3	Narcisa Atienza (PHI)	02:38.70	588	
4	Naw Yee Yee Than (MYA)	02:46.55	500	
5	Chaw Chaw (MYA)	02:50.05	463	

=== Summary ===
Rank	Athlete	100mH	HJ	SP	200m	LJ	JT	800m	Total	Notes
1st place, gold medalist(s)	Wassana Winatho (THA)	1014	966	680	882	744	661	609	5556	
2nd place, silver medalist(s)	Narcisa Atienza (PHI)	866	928	699	746	703	711	588	5241	
3rd place, bronze medalist(s)	Sunisa Khotseemueang (THA)	864	783	649	809	726	713	608	5152	
4	Naw Yee Yee Than (MYA)	580	523	522	660	500	471	500	3756	
5	Chaw Chaw (MYA)	603	491	390	638	522	414	463	3521	
