= Athletics at the 2013 SEA Games – Women's shot put =

The women's shot put at the 2013 SEA Games, the athletics was held in Naypyidaw, Myanmar. The track and field events took place at the Wunna Theikdi Stadiumon December 15.

== Schedule ==
All times are Myanmar Standard Time (UTC+06:30)

Date	Time	Event
Sunday, 15 December 2013	10:10	Final

== Records ==
Prior to this competition, the existing world, Asian, and Southeast Asian Games records were as follows.

World Record	Natalya Lisovskaya (URS)	22.63 m	Moscow, Soviet Union	7 June 1987
Asian Record	Li Meisu (CHN)	21.76 m	Shijiazhuang, China	23 April 1988
Games Record	Du Xianhui (SIN)	18.20 m	Hanoi, Vietnam	7 December 2003

== Results ==
Legend

- X — Failure

Rank	Athlete	Attempts						Result	Notes
Rank	Athlete	1	2	3	4	5	6	Result	Notes
1st place, gold medalist(s)	Zhang Guirong (SIN)	?	?	?	?	?	?	14.99	
2nd place, silver medalist(s)	Du Xianhui (SIN)	?	?	?	?	?	?	14.92	
3rd place, bronze medalist(s)	Sawitri Thongchao (THA)	?	?	?	?	?	?	14.82	
4	Juthaporn Krasaeyan (THA)	?	?	?	?	?	?	12.54	
5	Mar Mar San (MYA)	?	?	?	?	?	?	11.29	
6	Nan Mon (MYA)	?	?	?	?	?	?	10.49	
