= Sepak takraw at the 2013 SEA Games =

Sepak takraw at the 27th SEA Games took place at Wunna Theikdi Indoor Stadium in Naypyidaw, Myanmar between December 11–22.

== Medal summary ==
=== Men ===
Event	Gold	Silver	Bronze
Team	Thailand (THA); Anuwat Chaichana; Thanawat Chumsena; Somporn Jaisinghol; Pornchai Kaokaew; Sittipong Khamchan; Supachai Maneenat; Suriyan Peachan; Siriwat Sakha; Sahachat Sakhoncharoen; Kritsana Tanakorn; Assadin Wongyota; Yupadee Pattarapong	Indonesia (INA); Viktor Eka Prasetya; Samsul Hadi; Nofrisal; Saiyed Nur Adil; Hendra Pago; Yudi Purnomo; Saiful Rijal; Abrian Sihab Aldilatama; Husni Uba	Myanmar (MYA); Aung Ko Oo; Aung Myo Swe; Aung Pyah Tun; Kyaw Soe Win; Paing Moe Oo; Phone Khaing; Si Thu Lin; Thant Zin Oo; Wai Lin Aung; Yazar Tun; Zaw Latt; Zaw Zaw Aung
Team	Thailand (THA); Anuwat Chaichana; Thanawat Chumsena; Somporn Jaisinghol; Pornchai Kaokaew; Sittipong Khamchan; Supachai Maneenat; Suriyan Peachan; Siriwat Sakha; Sahachat Sakhoncharoen; Kritsana Tanakorn; Assadin Wongyota; Yupadee Pattarapong	Indonesia (INA); Viktor Eka Prasetya; Samsul Hadi; Nofrisal; Saiyed Nur Adil; Hendra Pago; Yudi Purnomo; Saiful Rijal; Abrian Sihab Aldilatama; Husni Uba	Malaysia (MAS); Nazirul Akmal Abd Rahman; Noor Azman Abdul Hamid; Farhan Adam; Mohd Muqlis Borhan; Mohd Hanafiah Dolah; Muhammad Syahmi Husin; Norshahruddin Mad Ghani; Sahidan Md Ali; Mohamad Fazil Mohd Asri; Izurin Refin; Mohd Syazreenqamar Salehan; Mohd Kamal Alfiza Shafie
Regu	Thailand (THA); Thanawat Chumsena; Pornchai Kaokaew; Siriwat Sakha; Sahachat Sakhoncharoen; Yupadee Pattarapong	Malaysia (MAS); Noor Azman Abdul Hamid; Mohd Muqlis Borhan; Mohd Hanafiah Dolah; Norshahruddin Mad Ghani; Izurin Refin	Myanmar (MYA); Aung Myo Swe; Aung Pyah Tun; Kyaw Soe Win; Thant Zin Oo; Yazar Tun
Regu	Thailand (THA); Thanawat Chumsena; Pornchai Kaokaew; Siriwat Sakha; Sahachat Sakhoncharoen; Yupadee Pattarapong	Malaysia (MAS); Noor Azman Abdul Hamid; Mohd Muqlis Borhan; Mohd Hanafiah Dolah; Norshahruddin Mad Ghani; Izurin Refin	Laos (LAO); Alounsack Khounmuangsene; Chakkaphanh Kounlasouth; Vixay Phommavongsa; Davoy Sanavongxay; Noum Souvannadee
Double Team	Myanmar (MYA); Aung Ko Oo; Aung Myo Swe; Aung Pyah Tun; Kyaw Soe Win; Si Thu Lin; Thant Zin Oo; Wai Lin Aung; Zaw Latt; Zaw Zaw Aung	Indonesia (INA); Viktor Eka Prasetya; Samsul Hadi; Nofrisal; Saiyed Nur Adil; Hendra Pago; Yudi Purnomo; Saiful Rijal; Abrian Sihab Aldilatama; Husni Uba	Brunei (BRU); Ismail Ang; Humaidi Brahim; Mohammad Shukri Jainen; Moh Hafizzuddin Jamaludin; Abdul Hadi Ariffin Matali; Marzuki Munap
Double Team	Myanmar (MYA); Aung Ko Oo; Aung Myo Swe; Aung Pyah Tun; Kyaw Soe Win; Si Thu Lin; Thant Zin Oo; Wai Lin Aung; Zaw Latt; Zaw Zaw Aung	Indonesia (INA); Viktor Eka Prasetya; Samsul Hadi; Nofrisal; Saiyed Nur Adil; Hendra Pago; Yudi Purnomo; Saiful Rijal; Abrian Sihab Aldilatama; Husni Uba	Cambodia (CAM); Cheat Keamra; Cheat Khemrin; Chin Sovannarith; Heng Rawut; Nang Sopheap; Ream Sokphearom; Johnny Sopheak; Ly Treung; Narith Ung
Double Regu	Myanmar (MYA); Si Thu Lin; Zaw Latt; Zaw Zaw Aung	Laos (LAO); Chakkaphanh Kounlasouth; Davoy Sanavongxay; Noum Souvannadee	Philippines (PHI); Emmanuel Escote; Jason Huerte; Rhey Jey Ortouste
Double Regu	Myanmar (MYA); Si Thu Lin; Zaw Latt; Zaw Zaw Aung	Laos (LAO); Chakkaphanh Kounlasouth; Davoy Sanavongxay; Noum Souvannadee	Indonesia (INA); Samsul Hadi; Saiful Rijal; Husni Uba
Hoop Takraw	Thailand (THA); Narachai Chumeungkusol; Wattana Jaiyen; Ekachai Masuk; Saharat Uonumpai; Chaiya Wattano; Thanaiwat Yoosuk	Myanmar (MYA); Aung Hlaing Moe; Aung Kyaw Moe; Aung Zaw; Kyaw Zaya; Than Zaw Oo; Thein Zaw Min	Brunei (BRU); Ismail Ang; Humaidi Brahim; Mohammad Shukri Jainen; Moh Hafizzuddin Jamaludin; Abdul Hadi Ariffin Matali; Marzuki Munap
Hoop Takraw	Thailand (THA); Narachai Chumeungkusol; Wattana Jaiyen; Ekachai Masuk; Saharat Uonumpai; Chaiya Wattano; Thanaiwat Yoosuk	Myanmar (MYA); Aung Hlaing Moe; Aung Kyaw Moe; Aung Zaw; Kyaw Zaya; Than Zaw Oo; Thein Zaw Min	Singapore (SIN); Muhammad Farhan Bin Aman; Hassan Bin Aziz; Muhammad Magrib Bin Ibrahim; Muhammad Nurirwan Bin Mazlan; Muhammad Haffiz Bin Ramli; Muhammad A'fif Bin Safiee

=== Women ===
Event	Gold	Silver	Bronze
Team	Thailand (THA); Nongnuch Inruengsorn; Wanwisa Jankaen; Thitima Mahakusol; Sudaporn Palang; Somruedee Pruepruk; Kaewjai Pumsawangkaew; Sunthari Rupsung; Thidarat Soda; Payom Srihongsa; Jongrak Srisamai; Rungtip Tanaking; Daranee Wongcharern	Myanmar (MYA); Ei Thinzar; Kay Zin Htut; Khin Hnin Wai; Khin Nu Nu Phyoe; Kyu Kyu Thin; Mar Mar Win; Naing Naing Win; Nan Su Myat San; Nant Khin Lay Nge; Nant Yin Yin Myint; Nwe Nwe Htwe; Thinzar Soe Nyunt	Indonesia (INA); Florensia Cristy; Mega Citra Kusuma Dewi; Nur Isni Chikita; Lena; Akyko Micheel; Dini Mita Sari; Eva Rahmawati; Rike Media Sari; Hasmawati Umar
Team	Thailand (THA); Nongnuch Inruengsorn; Wanwisa Jankaen; Thitima Mahakusol; Sudaporn Palang; Somruedee Pruepruk; Kaewjai Pumsawangkaew; Sunthari Rupsung; Thidarat Soda; Payom Srihongsa; Jongrak Srisamai; Rungtip Tanaking; Daranee Wongcharern	Myanmar (MYA); Ei Thinzar; Kay Zin Htut; Khin Hnin Wai; Khin Nu Nu Phyoe; Kyu Kyu Thin; Mar Mar Win; Naing Naing Win; Nan Su Myat San; Nant Khin Lay Nge; Nant Yin Yin Myint; Nwe Nwe Htwe; Thinzar Soe Nyunt	Malaysia (MAS); Nurrashidah Abdul Rashid; Noor Fairuz Azizan; Siti Norzubaidah Che Ab Wahab; Alice Harun; Rahilah Harun; Nor Farhana Ismail; Nur Liyana Ismail; Nurul Izzatul Hikmah Md Zulkif; Elly Syahira Rosli; Nur Azila Rosli; Asumalin Rattana Som Chok; Nor Azira Suhaimi
Regu	Thailand (THA); Wanwisa Jankaen; Sasiwimol Janthasit; Kaewjai Pumsawangkaew; Sunthari Rupsung; Payom Srihongsa	Myanmar (MYA); Aye Aye Than; Ei Thinzar; Kay Zin Htut; Nwe Nwe Htwe; Su Myat Yin	Laos (LAO); Khmpha Chaleunsy; Sonsavanh Keosoulya; Damdouane Lattanavongsa; Mely Matmanivong; Koy Xayavong
Regu	Thailand (THA); Wanwisa Jankaen; Sasiwimol Janthasit; Kaewjai Pumsawangkaew; Sunthari Rupsung; Payom Srihongsa	Myanmar (MYA); Aye Aye Than; Ei Thinzar; Kay Zin Htut; Nwe Nwe Htwe; Su Myat Yin	Vietnam (VIE); Thi Tam Le; Bach Van Nguyen; Hai Thao Nguyen; Thi Thu Hang Tran; Thi Thu Hoai Tran
Double Team	Thailand (THA); Masaya Duangsri; Sasiwimol Janthasit; Chonticha Maneesri; Siripar Mason; Fueangfa Praphatsarang; Somruedee Pruepruk; Jariya Seesawad; Payom Srihongsa; Rungtip Tanaking	Myanmar (MYA); Ei Thinzar; Kay Zin Htut; Khin Hnin Wai; Kyu Kyu Thin; May Zin Phyo; Nan Su Myat San; Nant Khin Lay Nge; Nant Yin Yin Myint; Phyu Phyu Than	Vietnam (VIE); Thi Yen Cao; Thi Xuyen Duong; Thi Tam Le; Thi Kim Thuy Luu; Bach Van Nguyen; Hai Thao Nguyen; Thai Linh Nguyen; Thi Mo Nguyen; Thi Quyen Nguyen
Double Team	Thailand (THA); Masaya Duangsri; Sasiwimol Janthasit; Chonticha Maneesri; Siripar Mason; Fueangfa Praphatsarang; Somruedee Pruepruk; Jariya Seesawad; Payom Srihongsa; Rungtip Tanaking	Myanmar (MYA); Ei Thinzar; Kay Zin Htut; Khin Hnin Wai; Kyu Kyu Thin; May Zin Phyo; Nan Su Myat San; Nant Khin Lay Nge; Nant Yin Yin Myint; Phyu Phyu Than	Indonesia (INA); Florensia Cristy; Mega Citra Kusuma Dewi; Nur Isni Chikita; Lena; Akyko Micheel; Dini Mita Sari; Eva Rahmawati; Rike Media Sari; Hasmawati Umar
Double Regu	Myanmar (MYA); Khin Hnin Wai; Kyu Kyu Thin; Phyu Phyu Than	Vietnam (VIE); Thi Tam Le; Hai Thao Nguyen; Thi Quyen Nguyen	Laos (LAO); Sonsavanh Keosoulya; Mely Matmanivong; Koy Xayavong
Double Regu	Myanmar (MYA); Khin Hnin Wai; Kyu Kyu Thin; Phyu Phyu Than	Vietnam (VIE); Thi Tam Le; Hai Thao Nguyen; Thi Quyen Nguyen	Indonesia (INA); Mega Citra Kusuma Dewi; Lena; Dini Mita Sari
Hoop Takraw	Myanmar (MYA); Kyu Kyu Thin; May Zin Phyo; Naing Naing Win; Nwe Nwe Htwe; Phyu Phyu Than; Su Tin Zar Naing	Laos (LAO); Philavanh Chanthsily; Silivanh Bounlai; Malathip Lacky; Vilaisouk Ladsamee; Samounty Noly; Phommachan Pathoumphone	Cambodia (CAM); Soth Sreyleak; Chanboramey Nguon; Sopha Pich; Sopheap San; Sophorn San; Soksan Uk

== Medal table ==
* Host nation (Myanmar)

Rank	Nation	Gold	Silver	Bronze	Total
1	Thailand	6	0	0	6
2	Myanmar*	4	4	2	10
3	Indonesia	0	2	4	6
4	Laos	0	2	3	5
5	Malaysia	0	1	2	3
5	Vietnam	0	1	2	3
7	Brunei	0	0	2	2
7	Cambodia	0	0	2	2
9	Philippines	0	0	1	1
9	Singapore	0	0	1	1
Totals (10 entries)		10	10	19	39

== Results ==
=== Men ===
==== Team ====
===== Preliminary round =====
Rank	Team	W	L	MF	MA	MD	PTS
1	Thailand (THA)	3	0	9	0	9	6
2	Indonesia (INA)	2	1	4	5	-1	5
3	Myanmar (MYA)	1	2	3	6	-3	4
4	Malaysia (MAS)	0	3	2	7	-5	3

Match	Team 1	Result	Team 2
MT1	Indonesia	2:1 (2:0, 0:2, 2:0)	Myanmar
MT2	Malaysia	0:3 (1:2, 0:2, 1:2)	Thailand
MT3	Malaysia	1:2 (1:2, 1:2, 2:0)	Myanmar
MT4	Indonesia	0:3 (0:2, 0:2, 1:2)	Thailand
MT5	Myanmar	0:3 (0:2, 0:2, 1:2)	Thailand
MT6	Indonesia	2:1 (2:1, 2:0, 0:2)	Malaysia

==== Regu ====
===== Preliminary round =====
Key to colours in group table
Group winner and runner-up advanced to the final

====== Group A ======
Rank	Team	W	L	MF	MA	MD	PTS
1	Malaysia (MAS)	2	0	4	0	4	4
2	Laos (LAO)	1	1	2	2	0	3
3	Cambodia (CAM)	0	2	0	4	-4	2

Match	Team 1	Result	Team 2
MR1	Malaysia	2:0 (21:18, 21:19)	Laos
MR3	Cambodia	0:2 (WO)	Laos
MR5	Malaysia	2:0 (WO)	Cambodia

====== Group B ======
Rank	Team	W	L	MF	MA	MD	PTS
1	Thailand (THA)	2	0	4	0	4	4
2	Myanmar (MYA)	1	1	2	2	0	3
3	Vietnam (VIE)	0	2	0	4	-4	2

Match	Team 1	Result	Team 2
MR2	Thailand	2:0 (21:14, 21:8)	Myanmar
MR4	Vietnam	0:2 (8:21, 15:21)	Myanmar
MR6	Thailand	2:0 (21:4, 21:13)	Vietnam

==== Hoop Takraw ====
===== Preliminary round =====
Key to colours in group table
Group winner and runner-up advanced to the final

Rank	Team	Score
1	Myanmar (MYA)	860
2	Thailand (THA)	810
3	Brunei (BRU)	420
4	Singapore (SIN)	280

Report

===== Final =====
Rank	Team	Score
1	Thailand (THA)	830
2	Myanmar (MYA)	650

Report

=== Women ===
==== Hoop Takraw ====
===== Preliminary round =====
Key to colours in group table
Group winner and runner-up advanced to the final

Rank	Team	Score
1	Myanmar (MYA)	660
2	Laos (LAO)	250
3	Cambodia (CAM)	160

Report

===== Final =====
Rank	Team	Score
1	Myanmar (MYA)	760
2	Laos (LAO)	300

Report
