= Canoeing at the 2013 SEA Games =

- Dates: 9–13 December

Canoeing at the 2013 SEA Games took place at Ngalike Dam, Naypyidaw, Myanmar between December 9–13.

== Medal table ==
* Host nation (Myanmar)

Rank	Nation	Gold	Silver	Bronze	Total
1	Myanmar*	5	5	2	12
2	Thailand	5	2	5	12
3	Indonesia	4	5	1	10
4	Singapore	2	2	2	6
5	Vietnam	0	2	5	7
6	Cambodia	0	0	1	1
6	Malaysia	0	0	1	1
6	Philippines	0	0	1	1
Totals (8 entries)		16	16	18	50

Source: 27th SEA Games Official Website

== Medalists ==
=== Men ===
Event	Gold	Silver	Bronze
C-1 200 m	Rungsawan Suansan; Thailand	Spens Stuber Mehue; Indonesia	Trần Văn Long; Vietnam
C-1 200 m	Rungsawan Suansan; Thailand	Spens Stuber Mehue; Indonesia	Pheary In; Cambodia
C-1 500 m	Spens Stuber Mehue; Indonesia	Win Htike; Myanmar	Rungsawan Suansan; Thailand
C-1 1000 m	Win Htike; Myanmar	Spens Stuber Mehue; Indonesia	Hermie Macaranas; Philippines
C-2 200 m	Indonesia; Anwar Tarra; Eka Octarorianus	Myanmar; Ye Aung Soe; Win Htike	Thailand; Phanudet Phetmikha; Nares Naoprakon
C-2 500 m	Thailand; Phanudet Phetmikha; Nares Naoprakon	Myanmar; Maung Maung; Win Htike	Indonesia; Eka Octarorianus; Anwar Tarra
C-2 1000 m	Myanmar; Sai Min Wai; Win Htike	Indonesia; Eka Octarorianus; Anwar Tarra	Vietnam; Nguyễn Thanh Sang; Lưu Văn Vững
K-1 200 m	Kasemsit Borriboonwasin; Thailand	Mervyn Toh; Singapore	Nguyễn Thành Quang; Vietnam
K-1 500 m	Kasemsit Borriboonwasin; Thailand	Nguyễn Thành Quang; Vietnam	Brandon Ooi; Singapore
K-4 1000 m	Thailand; Aditep Srichart; Wichan Jaitieng; Kasemsit Borriboonwasin; Nathaworn Waenphrom	Indonesia; Gandie; Maizir Riyondra; Muchlis; Silo	Myanmar; Saw Khay Sha; Aung Myo Thu; Zaw Wai Latt; Naing Lin

=== Women ===
Event	Gold	Silver	Bronze
K-1 200 m	Erni Sokoy; Indonesia	Kanokpan Suansan; Thailand	Hnin Wai Lwin; Myanmar
K-1 200 m	Erni Sokoy; Indonesia	Kanokpan Suansan; Thailand	Siti Rajah Ali; Malaysia
K-1 500 m	Erni Sokoy; Indonesia	Geraldine Lee; Singapore	Kanokpan Suansan; Thailand
K-2 200 m	Singapore; Stephenie Chen; Suzanne Seah	Myanmar; Naw Ahlelashe; Aye Mi Khine	Vietnam; Nguyễn Thị Mai; Kiều Thị Hảo
K-2 500 m	Singapore; Stephenie Chen; Suzanne Seah	Myanmar; Aye Mi Khine; Naw Ahlelashe	Thailand; Woraporn Boonyuhong; Pattraluck Phumsatan
K-4 200 m	Myanmar; Myint Myint Than; Myo Thandar Tun; Naw Ahlelashe; Aye Mi Khine	Thailand; Woraporn Boonyuhong; Manita Netprom; Kanokpan Suansan; Pattraluck Phumsatan	Singapore; Stephenie Chen; Geraldine Lee; Annabelle Ng; Sarah Chen
K-4 500 m	Myanmar; Myint Myint Than; Myo Thandar Tun; Naw Ahlelashe; Aye Mi Khine	Indonesia; Yulanda Esther Enthong; Kanti Santyawati; Since Lithasova Yom; Erni Sokoy	Vietnam; Nguyễn Thị Mai; Kiều Thị Hảo; Nguyễn Thị Duyên; Nguyễn Thị Lệ
K-4 1000 m	Myanmar; Myint Myint Than; Thin Thin Kyu; Naw Ahlelashe; Aye Mi Khine	Vietnam; Nguyễn Thị Mai; Kiều Thị Hảo; Nguyễn Thị Duyên; Nguyễn Thị Lệ	Thailand; Woraporn Boonyuhong; Manita Netprom; Kanokpan Suansan; Pattraluck Phumsatan

== Results ==
=== Men ===
==== C-1 200 m ====
Legend

- DSQ - Disqualified

All times are Myanmar Standard Time (UTC+06:30)

Date	Time	Event
Friday, 13 December 2013	09:30	Final

Rank	Athlete	Time
1st place, gold medalist(s)	Rungsawan Suansan (THA)	41.666
2nd place, silver medalist(s)	Spensstuber Mehue (INA)	41.906
3rd place, bronze medalist(s)	Tran Van Long (VIE)	43.106
3rd place, bronze medalist(s)	Pheary In (CAM)	43.106
5	Hermie Macaranas (PHI)	44.730
-	Maung Maung (MYA)	DSQ

==== C-1 500 m ====
All times are Myanmar Standard Time (UTC+06:30)

Date	Time	Event
Thursday, 12 December 2013	09:30	Final

Rank	Athlete	Time
1st place, gold medalist(s)	Spensstuber Mehue (INA)	1:59.256
2nd place, silver medalist(s)	Win Htike (MYA)	1:59.676
3rd place, bronze medalist(s)	Rungsawan Suansan (THA)	2:01.886
4	Hermie Macaranas (PHI)	2:03.038
5	Tran Van Long (VIE)	2:03.318
6	Pheary In (CAM)	2:18.846

==== C-1 1000 m ====
All times are Myanmar Standard Time (UTC+06:30)

Date	Time	Event
Tuesday, 10 December 2013	09:00	Final

Rank	Athlete	Time
1st place, gold medalist(s)	Win Htike (MYA)	4:18.952
2nd place, silver medalist(s)	Spensstuber Mehue (INA)	4:21.438
3rd place, bronze medalist(s)	Hermie Macaranas (PHI)	4:30.786
4	Rungsawan Suansan (THA)	4:38.376
5	Tran Van Long (VIE)	5:19.632

==== C-2 200 m ====
All times are Myanmar Standard Time (UTC+06:30)

Date	Time	Event
Friday, 13 December 2013	10:30	Final

Rank	Team	Time
1st place, gold medalist(s)	Phanudet Phetmikha; Nares Naoprakon (THA)	38.692
2nd place, silver medalist(s)	Maung Maung; Win Htike (MYA)	39.400
3rd place, bronze medalist(s)	Eka Octarorianus; Anwar Tarra (INA)	39.448
4	Tran Van Long; Nguyen Hong Quan (VIE)	41.870

==== C-2 500 m ====
All times are Myanmar Standard Time (UTC+06:30)

Date	Time	Event
Thursday, 12 December 2013	10:30	Final

Rank	Team	Time
1st place, gold medalist(s)	Anwar Tarra; Eka Octarorianus (INA)	1:49.594
2nd place, silver medalist(s)	Ye Aung Soe; Win Htike (MYA)	1:49.830
3rd place, bronze medalist(s)	Phanudet Phetmikha; Nares Naoprakon (THA)	1:51.978
4	Tran Van Long; Nguyen Hong Quan (VIE)	1:54.378

==== C-2 1000 m ====
All times are Myanmar Standard Time (UTC+06:30)

Date	Time	Event
Tuesday, 10 December 2013	10:10	Final

Rank	Team	Time
1st place, gold medalist(s)	Sai Min Wai; Win Htike (MYA)	3:58.022
2nd place, silver medalist(s)	Eka Octarorianus; Anwar Tarra (INA)	4:00.238
3rd place, bronze medalist(s)	Nguyen Thanh Sang; Luu Van Vung (VIE)	4:13.100
4	Nadtaphong Bhoonklin; Rungsawan Suansan (THA)	4:13.220

==== K-1 200 m ====
All times are Myanmar Standard Time (UTC+06:30)

Date	Time	Event
Friday, 13 December 2013	08:30	Heats
Friday, 13 December 2013	09:10	Semifinal
Friday, 13 December 2013	09:50	Final

===== Heats =====
- Qualification: 1–2 → Final (QF), 3-4 → Semifinal (QS)

====== Heat 1 ======
Rank	Athlete	Time	Notes
1	Mervyn Yingjie Toh (SIN)	37.762	QF
2	Naing Naing Zaw (MYA)	37.958	QF
3	Andri Sugiarto (INA)	38.058	QS
4	Hamdan Mohammad (MAS)	39.174	QS

====== Heat 2 ======
Rank	Athlete	Time	Notes
1	Kasemsit Borriboonwasin (THA)	37.260	QF
2	Nguyen Thanh Quang (VIE)	37.788	QF
3	Alex Generalo (PHI)	40.406	QS
4	Narun Pom (CAM)	44.302	QS

===== Semifinal =====
- Qualification: 1–2 → Final (QF)

Rank	Athlete	Time	Notes
1	Andri Sugiarto (INA)	37.658	QF
2	Hamdan Mohammad (MAS)	38.514	QF
3	Alex Generalo (PHI)	39.842	
4	Narun Pom (CAM)	43.368	

===== Final =====
Rank	Athlete	Time
1st place, gold medalist(s)	Kasemsit Borriboonwasin (THA)	36.578
2nd place, silver medalist(s)	Mervyn Yingjie Toh (SIN)	36.994
3rd place, bronze medalist(s)	Nguyen Thanh Quang (VIE)	37.042
4	Andri Sugiarto (INA)	37.454
5	Naing Naing Zaw (MYA)	38.594
6	Hamdan Mohammad (MAS)	38.806

==== K-1 500 m ====
All times are Myanmar Standard Time (UTC+06:30)

Date	Time	Event
Thursday, 12 December 2013	09:50	Final

Rank	Athlete	Time
1st place, gold medalist(s)	Kasemsit Borriboonwasin (THA)	1:51.364
2nd place, silver medalist(s)	Nguyen Thanh Quang (VIE)	1:51.812
3rd place, bronze medalist(s)	Wei Cheng Brandon Ooi (SIN)	1:55.738
4	Sutrisno Sutrisno (INA)	1:55.930
5	Naing Lin (MYA)	1:57.386
6	Alex Generalo (PHI)	1:58.018
7	Khairul Amri Ibrahim (MAS)	2:14.694
8	Rady Hun (CAM)	2:16.038

==== K-4 1000 m ====
All times are Myanmar Standard Time (UTC+06:30)

Date	Time	Event
Thursday, 12 December 2013	09:50	Final

Rank	Team	Time
1st place, gold medalist(s)	Thailand (THA); Aditep Srichart; Wichan Jaitieng; Kasemsit Borriboonwasin; Nathaworn Waenphrom	3:13.876
2nd place, silver medalist(s)	Indonesia (INA); Gandie Gandie; Maizir Riyondra; Muchlis Muchlis; Silo Silo	3:18.478
3rd place, bronze medalist(s)	Myanmar (MYA); Saw Khay Sha; Aung Myo Thu; Zaw Wai Latt; Naing Lin	3:19.198
4	Singapore (SIN); Wei Liang Bill Lee; Zi Qiang Tay; Wei Fu Benjamin Low; Guang Yi Lucas Teo	3:19.238
5	Vietnam (VIE); Dang Thanh Vuong; Do Manh Hung; Nguyen Thanh Loc; Nguyen Van Tuan	3:21.902
6	Malaysia (MAS); Hamdan Mohammad; Mohd Tarmizi Zakaria; Khairul Amri Ibrahim; Adam Aris	3:42.064

=== Women ===
==== K-1 200 m ====
All times are Myanmar Standard Time (UTC+06:30)

Date	Time	Event
Friday, 13 December 2013	09:20	Final

Rank	Athlete	Time
1st place, gold medalist(s)	Erni Sokoy (INA)	42.948
2nd place, silver medalist(s)	Kanokpan Suansan (THA)	43.100
3rd place, bronze medalist(s)	Siti Rajiah Ali (MAS)	43.164
3rd place, bronze medalist(s)	Hnin Wai Lwin (MYA)	43.164
5	Jiemei Sarah Chen (SIN)	44.040
6	Nguyen Thi Duyen (VIE)	44.188

==== K-1 500 m ====
All times are Myanmar Standard Time (UTC+06:30)

Date	Time	Event
Thursday, 12 December 2013	09:20	Final

Rank	Athlete	Time
1st place, gold medalist(s)	Erni Sokoy (INA)	2:06.090
2nd place, silver medalist(s)	Wei Ling Geraldine Lee (SIN)	2:07.734
3rd place, bronze medalist(s)	Kanokpan Suansan (THA)	2:08.894
4	Hnin Wai Lwin (MYA)	2:10.918
5	Nguyen Thi Duyen (VIE)	2:12.534
6	Nor Azita Ibrahim (MAS)	2:36.730

==== K-2 200 m ====
All times are Myanmar Standard Time (UTC+06:30)

Date	Time	Event
Friday, 13 December 2013	10:10	Final

Rank	Team	Time
1st place, gold medalist(s)	Jiexian Stephenie Chen; Suzanne Seah (SIN)	40.864
2nd place, silver medalist(s)	Naw Ahlelashe; Aye Mi Khine (MYA)	41.260
3rd place, bronze medalist(s)	Nguyen Thi Mai; Kieu Thi Hao (VIE)	41.764
4	Woraporn Boonyuhong; Pattraluck Phumsatan (THA)	41.840
5	Erni Sokoy; Sincelithasova Yom (INA)	41.888
6	Noor Azira Ibrahim; Siti Rajiah Ali (MAS)	48.952

==== K-2 500 m ====
All times are Myanmar Standard Time (UTC+06:30)

Date	Time	Event
Thursday, 12 December 2013	10:10	Final

Rank	Team	Time
1st place, gold medalist(s)	Jiexian Stephenie Chen; Suzanne Seah (SIN)	1:56.614
2nd place, silver medalist(s)	Aye Mi Khine; Naw Ahlelashe (MYA)	1:58.686
3rd place, bronze medalist(s)	Woraporn Boonyuhong; Pattraluck Phumsatan (THA)	1:59.734
4	Nguyen Thi Mai; Kieu Thi Hao (VIE)	1:59.758
5	Masripah; Dayumin Dayumin (INA)	2:05.580
6	Nurul Farahim Wahab; Faizah Firdaus Fauzi (MAS)	2:27.498

==== K-4 200 m ====
All times are Myanmar Standard Time (UTC+06:30)

Date	Time	Event
Friday, 13 December 2013	11:00	Final

Rank	Team	Time
1st place, gold medalist(s)	Myanmar (MYA); Phyu Thi Oo; Myo Thandar Tun; Naw Ahlelashe; Aye Mi Khine	37.390
2nd place, silver medalist(s)	Thailand (THA); Woraporn Boonyuhong; Manita Netprom; Kanokpan Suansan; Pattraluck Phumsatan	37.682
3rd place, bronze medalist(s)	Singapore (SIN); Jiexian Stephenie Chen; Wei Ling Geraldine Lee; Xiang Ru Annabelle Ng; Jiemei Sarah Chen	37.782
4	Indonesia (INA); Yulanda Ester Enthong; Dayumin Dayumin; Sincelithasova Yom; Erni Sokoy	38.554
5	Vietnam (VIE); Nguyen Thi Mai; Kieu Thi Hao; Nguyen Thi Duyen; Nguyen Thi Le	38.614
6	Malaysia (MAS); Noor Azira Ibrahim; Nor Azita Ibrahim; Nurul Farahim Wahab; Faizah Firdaus Fauzi	43.180

==== K-4 500 m ====
All times are Myanmar Standard Time (UTC+06:30)

Date	Time	Event
Thursday, 12 December 2013	11:00	Final

Rank	Team	Time
1st place, gold medalist(s)	Myanmar (MYA); Myint Myint Than; Myo Thandar Tun; Naw Ahlelashe; Aye Mi Khine	1:44.156
2nd place, silver medalist(s)	Indonesia (INA); Yulanda Ester Enthong; Kanti Santyawati; Sincelithasova Yom; Erni Sokoy	1:44.344
3rd place, bronze medalist(s)	Vietnam (VIE); Nguyen Thi Mai; Kieu Thi Hao; Nguyen Thi Duyen; Nguyen Thi Le	1:45.776
4	Singapore (SIN); Jiexian Stephenie Chen; Wei Ling Geraldine Lee; Xiang Ru Annabelle Ng; Yang Jing Wilona Lee	1:46.024
5	Thailand (THA); Woraporn Boonyuhong; Manita Netprom; Kanokpan Suansan; Pattraluck Phumsatan	1:47.836
6	Malaysia (MAS); Noor Azira Ibrahim; Nor Azita Ibrahim; Nurul Farahim Wahab; Faizah Firdaus Fauzi	2:07.842

==== K-4 1000 m ====
All times are Myanmar Standard Time (UTC+06:30)

Date	Time	Event
Tuesday, 10 December 2013	09:10	Final

Rank	Team	Time
1st place, gold medalist(s)	Myanmar (MYA); Myint Myint Than; Thin Thin Kyu; Naw Ahlelashe; Aye Mi Khine	3:41.356
2nd place, silver medalist(s)	Vietnam (VIE); Nguyen Thi Mai; Kieu Thi Hao; Nguyen Thi Duyen; Nguyen Thi Le	3:41.972
3rd place, bronze medalist(s)	Thailand (THA); Woraporn Boonyuhong; Manita Netprom; Kanokpan Suansan; Pattraluck Phumsatan	3:44.108
4	Singapore (SIN); Xiang Ru Annabelle Ng; Suzanne Seah; Wei Ling Geraldine Lee; Yang Jing Wilona Lee	3:44.200
5	Indonesia (INA); Yulanda Ester Enthong; Yunita Kadop; Sincelithasova Yom; Erni Sokoy	3:49.086
6	Malaysia (MAS); Noor Azira Ibrahim; Nor Azita Ibrahim; Nurul Farahim Wahab; Faizah Firdaus Fauzi	4:26.300
