= Muay Thai at the 2013 SEA Games =

Muay Thai in the 27th SEA Games took place at Wunna Theikdi Boxing Indoor Stadium in Naypyidaw, Myanmar between December 12–21.

== Medalists ==
=== Men ===
Event	Gold	Silver	Bronze
48 kg	Kienkay Singsavath; Laos	Nattawut Bor Ngern; Thailand	Mohd Sukri bin Hassan; Malaysia
48 kg	Kienkay Singsavath; Laos	Nattawut Bor Ngern; Thailand	Myo Myint; Myanmar
51 kg	Mohd Lokman Akimi bin Mat Roji; Malaysia	Ngo Trieu Nhat Nguyen; Vietnam	Somsay Sopaseuth; Laos
51 kg	Mohd Lokman Akimi bin Mat Roji; Malaysia	Ngo Trieu Nhat Nguyen; Vietnam	Suriya Lamontree; Thailand
54 kg	Saw Dar Pot; Myanmar	Phillip Delarmino; Philippines	Bouaphan Phankeo; Laos
57 kg	Pisal Iamsiri; Thailand	Phu Hien Nguyen; Vietnam	Yusuf Susilo; Indonesia
57 kg	Pisal Iamsiri; Thailand	Phu Hien Nguyen; Vietnam	Ain bin Kamarrudin; Malaysia
60 kg	Ronnakit Boontree; Thailand	Latsasack Souliyavong; Laos	Mohamad Rafi bin Abdul Manaf; Malaysia
60 kg	Ronnakit Boontree; Thailand	Latsasack Souliyavong; Laos	Nguyễn Trần Duy Nhất; Vietnam
63.5 kg	Panupong Tanjad; Thailand	Jonathan Polosan; Philippines	Soe Lin Oo; Myanmar
63.5 kg	Panupong Tanjad; Thailand	Jonathan Polosan; Philippines	Van Dai Vo; Vietnam
67 kg	Too Too; Myanmar	Panupun Tanjad; Thailand	Nouna Ngeumsangouane; Laos
67 kg	Too Too; Myanmar	Panupun Tanjad; Thailand	Van Dung Huynh; Vietnam
71 kg	Tun Tun Min; Myanmar	Indra Ashari Jaya; Indonesia	Quoc Hung Truong; Vietnam
75 kg	Mohd Faizal bin Ramli; Malaysia	Saw Nga Man; Myanmar	Angga; Indonesia

=== Women ===
Event	Gold	Silver	Bronze
48 kg	Hla Yin May; Myanmar	Thi Quynh Bui; Vietnam	Laty Keobounphanh; Laos
51 kg	Yen Ly Bui; Vietnam	Grace; Myanmar	Lattaya Alounbouala; Laos
51 kg	Yen Ly Bui; Vietnam	Grace; Myanmar	Sasithorn Liangprasert; Thailand
54 kg	Preciosa Ocaya; Philippines	Phithsaya Phoumchanh; Laos	Suchaya Bualuang; Thailand
57 kg	Sirisopa Sirisak; Thailand	Thi Ngoc Linh Phan; Vietnam	Zin Mar Khine; Myanmar
60 kg	Thi Ngoc Nguyen; Vietnam	Thu Zar Han; Myanmar	Henni Lestari Pasaribu; Indonesia
60 kg	Thi Ngoc Nguyen; Vietnam	Thu Zar Han; Myanmar	Soutchay Silapheth; Laos

=== Medal table ===
* Host nation (Myanmar)

Rank	Nation	Gold	Silver	Bronze	Total
1	Myanmar*	4	3	3	10
2	Thailand	4	2	3	9
3	Vietnam	2	4	4	10
4	Malaysia	2	0	3	5
5	Laos	1	2	6	9
6	Philippines	1	2	0	3
7	Indonesia	0	1	3	4
Totals (7 entries)		14	14	22	50
