= Wrestling at the 2013 SEA Games =

Wrestling at the 2013 SEA Games was held at Thuwunna Indoor Stadium, Yangon, Myanmar between December 9–13.

== Medalists ==
=== Men's Greco-Roman ===
Event	Gold	Silver	Bronze
55 kg	Đới Đăng Tiến; Vietnam	Margarito Angana Jr. Philippines	Suparmanto; Indonesia
60 kg	Ritisak Pravan; Thailand	Wunna Htun; Myanmar	Sathaphone Thammavongsa; Laos
60 kg	Ritisak Pravan; Thailand	Wunna Htun; Myanmar	Phạm Sỹ Thu; Vietnam
66 kg	Trần Văn Trường; Vietnam	Rustang; Indonesia	Htun Aung; Myanmar
74 kg	Kusno Hadi Saputra; Indonesia	Atthaphol Sirithahan; Thailand	Khổng Văn Khoa; Vietnam
84 kg	Kov Chheang Hong; Cambodia	Jason Balabal; Philippines	Chinnawet Kanchalee; Thailand
96 kg	Zaw Moe Aung; Myanmar	Khonkeo Thatthavong; Laos	Nguon Heng Kim; Cambodia
120 kg	Myint Zin; Myanmar	Dorn Sov; Cambodia	Phouxay Thongkhamerng; Laos

=== Men's freestyle ===
Event	Gold	Silver	Bronze
55 kg	Nguyễn Huy Hà; Vietnam	Eko Roni Saputra; Indonesia	Aung Aung; Myanmar
55 kg	Nguyễn Huy Hà; Vietnam	Eko Roni Saputra; Indonesia	Alvin Lobrequito; Philippines
60 kg	Nguyễn Thế Anh; Vietnam	Muhammad Iqbal; Indonesia	Denpiseth Kang; Cambodia
60 kg	Nguyễn Thế Anh; Vietnam	Muhammad Iqbal; Indonesia	Jhonny Morte; Philippines
66 kg	Bùi Tuấn Anh; Vietnam	Ricky Fajar Adi Saputra; Indonesia	Joseph Angana; Philippines
74 kg	Cấn Tất Dự; Vietnam	Tadsapol Pasawang; Thailand	Saw Gar Byiel; Myanmar
84 kg	Fahrjansyah; Indonesia	Methee Tepakam; Thailand	Jason Balabal; Philippines
96 kg	Phonexay Phanchanxay; Laos	Kyaw Win Oo; Myanmar	Joshua Sou; Cambodia
120 kg	Sov Dorn; Cambodia	Phyo Zaw Khine; Myanmar	Sengsouly Manivong; Laos

=== Women's freestyle ===
Event	Gold	Silver	Bronze
44 kg	Chov Sotheara; Cambodia	Sureeporn Pimpak; Thailand	Thidar Soe; Myanmar
48 kg	Vũ Thị Hằng; Vietnam	Sriprapa Tho Kaew; Thailand	Panay Nokeo; Laos
48 kg	Vũ Thị Hằng; Vietnam	Sriprapa Tho Kaew; Thailand	Inadrah; Indonesia
51 kg	Nguyễn Thị Lụa; Vietnam	Heka Mayasari; Indonesia	Chan Raksmey; Cambodia
55 kg	Phạm Thị Huệ; Vietnam	Maliwan Muangpor; Thailand	Aye Aye Aung; Myanmar
59 kg	Phạm Thị Loan; Vietnam	Salinee Srisombat; Thailand	Ridha Wahdaniyaty Ridwan; Indonesia
63 kg	Ni Samnang; Cambodia	Latxomphou Oday; Laos	Wai Lwin Aung; Myanmar
67 kg	May Thazin Phoo; Myanmar	Chea Sreymeas; Cambodia	Soumaly Phinith; Laos

== Medal table ==
* Host nation (Myanmar)

Rank	Nation	Gold	Silver	Bronze	Total
1	Vietnam (VIE)	10	0	2	12
2	Cambodia (CAM)	4	2	4	10
3	Myanmar (MYA)*	3	3	6	12
4	Indonesia (INA)	2	5	3	10
5	Thailand (THA)	1	7	1	9
6	Laos (LAO)	1	2	5	8
7	Philippines (PHI)	0	2	4	6
Totals (7 entries)		21	21	25	67
