= Pétanque at the 2013 SEA Games =

Petanque at the 2013 SEA Games

Pétanque in the 27th SEA Games was held in Naypyidaw, Myanmar between December 12–21.

== Medal summary ==
=== Men ===
Event	Gold	Silver	Bronze
Singles	Than Zaw Oo; Myanmar	Wattanachai Sonthung; Thailand	Samnang Ouk; Cambodia
Singles	Than Zaw Oo; Myanmar	Wattanachai Sonthung; Thailand	Syed Akmal Fikri Syed Ali; Malaysia
Doubles	Thailand (THA); Thaloengkiat Phusa-At; Suksan Piachan	Cambodia (CAM); Sok Chanmean; Chhoeun Thong	Laos (LAO); Phonexay Souangmisy; Desa Phimmasan
Doubles	Thailand (THA); Thaloengkiat Phusa-At; Suksan Piachan	Cambodia (CAM); Sok Chanmean; Chhoeun Thong	Vietnam (VIE); Quoc Huu Ho; Tuan Thanh Thach
Triples	Laos (LAO); Soulasith Khamvongsa; Vongphachanh Panyabandid; Saysamone Sengdao; Phonepasert Soukkhaphon	Thailand (THA); Pakin Phukram; Panukorn Roeksanit; Nattapon Suktong; Kiatkong Tanong	Malaysia (MAS); Mohamad Hakem Ahmad Saberi; Muhamad Hafizuddin Mat Daud; Saiful Bahri Musmin
Triples	Laos (LAO); Soulasith Khamvongsa; Vongphachanh Panyabandid; Saysamone Sengdao; Phonepasert Soukkhaphon	Thailand (THA); Pakin Phukram; Panukorn Roeksanit; Nattapon Suktong; Kiatkong Tanong	Vietnam (VIE); Phu Thinh Cao; Xuan Loc Nguyen; The An Phan; Khang Duy Vu
Shooting	Bouadeng Vongvone; Laos	Van Quang Nguyen; Vietnam	Sopanha Dy; Cambodia
Shooting	Bouadeng Vongvone; Laos	Van Quang Nguyen; Vietnam	Sarawut Sriboonpeng; Thailand

=== Women ===
Event	Gold	Silver	Bronze
Singles	Ei Thu Caw; Myanmar	Sreya Un; Cambodia	Nattaya Yoothong; Thailand
Singles	Ei Thu Caw; Myanmar	Sreya Un; Cambodia	Thi Chanh Tha Son; Vietnam
Doubles	Thailand (THA); Thongsri Thamakord-At; Phantipha Wongchuvej	Cambodia (CAM); Sophorn Douch; Sreymom Ouk	Malaysia (MAS); Nurul Farzieana Abdul Malek; Suhartisera Zamri
Doubles	Thailand (THA); Thongsri Thamakord-At; Phantipha Wongchuvej	Cambodia (CAM); Sophorn Douch; Sreymom Ouk	Vietnam (VIE); Thi Ngoc Bich Nguyen; Thi Hang Thai
Triples	Thailand (THA); Wanida Daenkrathok; Nantawan Fueangsanit; Mayula Phomlang; Taddaw Pundech	Vietnam (VIE); Thi Ut Thuong Le; Thi Huyen Tran Ngo; Thi Cam Duyen Nguyen; Thi Diem Trang Tran	Laos (LAO); Linda Keoborlakot; Noy Noy; Butsady Sengmany; Souphaphanh Xaysana
Triples	Thailand (THA); Wanida Daenkrathok; Nantawan Fueangsanit; Mayula Phomlang; Taddaw Pundech	Vietnam (VIE); Thi Ut Thuong Le; Thi Huyen Tran Ngo; Thi Cam Duyen Nguyen; Thi Diem Trang Tran	Myanmar (MYA); Gan Gaw Thant Zin; Nan Pauk Pauk Phyu; Thin Thin War Tun; Yoon Me Me Kyaw
Shooting	Ke Leng; Cambodia	Pawinee Pontjanaseni; Thailand	Khoun Souksavat; Laos
Shooting	Ke Leng; Cambodia	Pawinee Pontjanaseni; Thailand	Thi Thi Nguyen; Vietnam

=== Mixed ===
Event	Gold	Silver	Bronze
Double	Myanmar (MYA); Thet Wai Aung; Yin Min Aye	Laos (LAO); Xok Ananh Fongsanouvong; Khonesananh Phachantha	Malaysia (MAS); Nur Thahira Tasnim Abdul Aziz; Mohd Faiza Mohamad
Double	Myanmar (MYA); Thet Wai Aung; Yin Min Aye	Laos (LAO); Xok Ananh Fongsanouvong; Khonesananh Phachantha	Vietnam (VIE); Thanh Lan Anh Cao; Tan Xuan Vo
Triple (2-M & 1-W)	Laos (LAO); Ounhuen Detsanghan; Vansamay Neutsavath; Chansamone Vongsavath	Thailand (THA); Thanakorn Sangkaew; Aumpawan Suwannaphruk; Supan Thongphoo	Cambodia (CAM); Vanna Sieng; Chakriya Songvat; Chandararith Ya
Triple (2-M & 1-W)	Laos (LAO); Ounhuen Detsanghan; Vansamay Neutsavath; Chansamone Vongsavath	Thailand (THA); Thanakorn Sangkaew; Aumpawan Suwannaphruk; Supan Thongphoo	Vietnam (VIE); Ngoc Tai Ly; Huu Phuoc Mai; Pha Nara Thach
Triple (1-M & 2-W)	Laos (LAO); Lar Nienmani; Manyvanh Souliya; Bovilak Thepphakan	Cambodia (CAM); Sreipich Chhin; Dina Duong; Nora Tep	Malaysia (MAS); Anis Amira Basri; Mas Anis Syakirah Mohamad Jafri; Syed Ali Syed Akil
Triple (1-M & 2-W)	Laos (LAO); Lar Nienmani; Manyvanh Souliya; Bovilak Thepphakan	Cambodia (CAM); Sreipich Chhin; Dina Duong; Nora Tep	Vietnam (VIE); Cong Tam Huynh; Thi Hien Nguyen; Thi Phuong Em Tran

== Medal table ==
* Host nation (Myanmar)

Rank	Nation	Gold	Silver	Bronze	Total
1	Laos (LAO)	4	1	3	8
2	Thailand (THA)	3	4	2	9
3	Myanmar (MYA)*	3	0	1	4
4	Cambodia (CAM)	1	4	3	8
5	Vietnam (VIE)	0	2	8	10
6	Malaysia (MAS)	0	0	5	5
Totals (6 entries)		11	11	22	44

Preceded by 2011	Pétanque at the SEA Games; 2013 SEA Games	Succeeded by 2015
