= Shooting at the 2013 SEA Games =

Shooting at the 2013 SEA Games took place at North Dagon Shooting Range in Yangon, Myanmar between December 11–17.

== Medal summary ==
=== Men ===
Event	Gold	Silver	Bronze
10 m air pistol	Hoàng Xuân Vinh; Vietnam	Eddy Chew; Malaysia	Lim Swee Hon; Singapore
10 m air pistol team	Vietnam; Hồ Thanh Hải; Hoàng Xuân Vinh; Trần Quốc Cường	Singapore; Gai Bin; Lim Swee Hon; Poh Lip Meng	Malaysia; Eddy Chew; Choo Wen Yan; Johnathan Wong
50 m free pistol	Eddy Chew; Malaysia	Ye Tun Naung; Myanmar	Johnathan Wong; Malaysia
50 m free pistol team	Vietnam; Hoàng Xuân Vinh; Nguyễn Hoàng Phương; Trần Quốc Cường	Singapore; Gai Bin; Lim Swee Hon; Poh Lip Meng	Malaysia; Abdul Malek Abdul Hadi; Eddy Chew; Johnathan Wong
50 m rifle prone	Nguyễn Thành Đạt; Vietnam	Napis Tortungpanich; Thailand	Abel Lim Wen Yi; Singapore
50 m rifle prone team	Thailand; Tevarit Majchacheep; Napis Tortungpanich; Attapon Uea-aree	Vietnam; Nguyễn Duy Hoàng; Nguyễn Thành Đạt; Phùng Lê Huyên	Myanmar; Aung Thuya; Ling Aung; Wai Yan Min Thu

=== Women ===
Event	Gold	Silver	Bronze
10 m air pistol	Nguyễn Minh Châu; Vietnam	Teo Shun Xie; Singapore	Lê Thị Hoàng Ngọc; Vietnam
10 m air pistol team	Vietnam; Lê Thị Hoàng Ngọc; Nguyễn Minh Châu; Triệu Thị Hoa Hồng	Malaysia; Joseline Cheah; Wahidah Ismail; Bibiana Ng	Singapore; Teh Xiu Hong; Teh Xiu Yi; Teo Shun Xie
25 m sport pistol	Nicole Tan Ying Chao; Singapore	Siti Nur Masitah Mohd Badrin; Malaysia	Triệu Thị Hoa Hồng; Vietnam
25 m sport pistol team	Vietnam; Đặng Lê Ngọc Mai; Nguyễn Thùy Dung; Triệu Thị Hoa Hồng	Singapore; Nicole Tan Ying Chao; Teh Xiu Hong; Teo Shun Xie	Thailand; Pattarasuda Sowsanga; Naphaswan Yangpaiboon; Nerissa Yoksuwan
50 m rifle prone	Thu Thu Kyaw; Myanmar	Thanyalak Chotphibunsin; Thailand	Ratchadaporn Plengsaengthong; Thailand
50 m rifle prone team	Thailand; Thanyalak Chotphibunsin; Vitchuda Pichitkanjanakul; Ratchadaporn Plengsaengthong	Myanmar; Aye Aye Thin; Than Than Saw; Thu Thu Kyaw	Malaysia; Haslisa Hamed; Nur Suryani Taibi; Muslifah Zulkifli

== Medal table ==
* Host nation (Myanmar)

Rank	Nation	Gold	Silver	Bronze	Total
1	Vietnam	7	1	2	10
2	Thailand	2	2	2	6
3	Singapore	1	4	3	8
4	Malaysia	1	3	4	8
5	Myanmar*	1	2	1	4
Totals (5 entries)		12	12	12	36
