= Cambodia at the 2013 SEA Games =

Cambodia at the 2013 Southeast Asian Games
- IOC code: CAM
- NOC: National Olympic Committee of Cambodia
- Website: www.noccambodia.org (in Khmer and English)

in Naypyidaw
- Medals Ranked 9th: Gold 8 Silver 11 Bronze 28 Total 47

Southeast Asian Games appearances (overview)
- 1961; 1965; 1967–1981; 1983; 1985; 1987; 1989–1993; 1995; 1997; 1999; 2001; 2003; 2005; 2007; 2009; 2011; 2013; 2015; 2017; 2019; 2021; 2023; 2025; 2027; 2029

Cambodia competed at the 2013 Southeast Asian Games. The 27th Southeast Asian Games took place in Naypyidaw, the capital of Myanmar, as well as in two other main cities, Yangon and Mandalay.

== Medals ==
=== Medal table ===
| Sport | Gold | Silver | Bronze | Total |
|---|---|---|---|---|
| Canoeing | 0 | 0 | 1 | 1 |
| Chinlone | 0 | 2 | 4 | 6 |
| Kenpō | 0 | 0 | 3 | 3 |
| Pétanque | 1 | 4 | 3 | 8 |
| Sepak takraw | 0 | 0 | 2 | 2 |
| Taekwondo | 1 | 2 | 2 | 5 |
| Traditional boat race | 0 | 0 | 1 | 1 |
| Vovinam | 2 | 1 | 7 | 10 |
| Wrestling | 4 | 2 | 4 | 10 |
| Wushu | 0 | 0 | 1 | 1 |
| Total | 8 | 11 | 28 | 47 |
Source: First Source, Second Source

=== Medalists ===
| Medal | Name | Sport | Event | Date |
|---|---|---|---|---|
| Gold | KOV Chheang Hong | Wrestling | Men's Greco–84 kg | December 10 |
| Silver | DORN Sov | Wrestling | Men's Greco–120 kg | December 9 |
| Silver | CHEA Sreymeas | Wrestling | Women's Free Style–67 kg | December 9 |
| Silver | SOPHEAK Johnny; CHEAT Khemrin; TREUNG Ly; UNG Narith; HENG Rawut; REAM Sokphearom; NANG Sopheap; CHIN Sovannarith | Chinlone | Men Non-Repetition | December 7 |
| Bronze | NGUON Chanboramy; CHAN Pichnha; EM Piseth; UK Soksan; PICH Sopha; SAN Sopheap; SAN Sophorn; SOTH Sreyleak | Chinlone | Women Non-Repetition | December 9 |
| Bronze | SOPHEAK Johnny; CHEAT Khemrin; TREUNG Ly; UNG Narith; HENG Rawut; REAM Sokphearom; NANG Sopheap; CHIN Sovannarith | Chinlone | Men Non-Repetition | December 9 |
| Bronze | NGUON Chanboramy; CHAN Pichnha; EM Piseth; UK Soksan; PICH Sopha; SAN Sopheap; SAN Sophorn; SOTH Sreyleak | Chinlone | Women's Non-Repetition | December 7 |
| Bronze | LUY Rinda | Wushu | Men 52 kg | December 9 |
