= Laos at the 2013 SEA Games =

Laos at the 2013 Southeast Asian Games
- IOC code: LAO
- NOC: National Olympic Committee of Lao

in Naypyidaw
- Competitors: 334 in 27 sports
- Flag bearer: Somphavanh Louanglat (Petanque)
- Officials: 114
- Medals Ranked 8th: Gold 13 Silver 17 Bronze 49 Total 79

Southeast Asian Games appearances
- 1959; 1961; 1965; 1967; 1969; 1971; 1973; 1975–1987; 1989; 1991; 1993; 1995; 1997; 1999; 2001; 2003; 2005; 2007; 2009; 2011; 2013; 2015; 2017; 2019; 2021; 2023; 2025; 2027; 2029

Laos competed at the 2013 Southeast Asian Games. The 27th Southeast Asian Games took place in Naypyidaw, the capital of Myanmar, as well as in two other main cities, Yangon and Mandalay. Laos sent 334 athletes with 207 males and 127 females.

== Medalist ==
Medal	Name	Sport	Event	Date
Gold	Lar Nienmani; Manyvanh Souliya; Bovilak Thepphakan	Petanque	Mixed triple (2 females)	
Gold	Bouadeng Vongvone	Petanque	Men's shooting	
Gold	Vansamay Neutsavath; Ounhuen Detsanghan; Chansamone Vongsavath	Petanque	Mixed triple (2 males)	
Gold	Soulasith Khamvongsa; Vongphachanh Panyabandid; Saysamone Sengdao; Phonepasert Soukkhaphon	Petanque	Men's team	
Gold	Soukanh Taypanyavong	Vovinam	Men's 55 kg	
Gold	Phaylath Thammavongsa	Vovinam	Men's Tu Tuong Con Phap	
Gold	Kiankai Singsavath	Muay	Men's 48 kg	
Gold	Phouthasone Thammavong	Taekwondo	Men's 68 kg	
Gold	Phonenaly Sayarath	Judo	Women's 52 kg	
Gold	Phonexay Phanchanxay	Wrestling	Men's 70 kg	
Gold	Ariya Phounsavath	Cycling	Men's road race	
Gold	Khamvarn Vanlivong; Phone Khamkeo	Archery	Mixed Compound	
Gold	Khamla Soukhaphone	Wushu	Men's 56 kg Sanshou	
