= Vietnam at the 2013 SEA Games =

Vietnam at the 2013 Southeast Asian Games
- IOC code: VIE
- NOC: Vietnam Olympic Committee
- Website: www.voc.org.vn (in Vietnamese and English)

in Naypyidaw
- Competitors: 511 in 33 sports
- Flag bearer: Hoàng Quý Phước
- Medals Ranked 3rd: Gold 74 Silver 85 Bronze 86 Total 245

Southeast Asian Games appearances (overview)
- 1989; 1991; 1993; 1995; 1997; 1999; 2001; 2003; 2005; 2007; 2009; 2011; 2013; 2015; 2017; 2019; 2021; 2023; 2025; 2027; 2029

Vietnam competed at the 2013 Southeast Asian Games. The 27th Southeast Asian Games took place in Naypyidaw, the capital of Myanmar, as well as in two other main cities, Yangon and Mandalay.

== Medal table ==
Sport	Gold	Silver	Bronze	Total
Athletics	10	11	12	33
Wrestling	10	0	2	12
Shooting	7	1	2	10
Vovinam	6	10	2	18
Swimming	5	5	2	12
Taekwondo	5	4	3	12
Wushu	5	3	4	12
Judo	3	7	3	13
Pencak silat	3	5	1	9
Kenpō	3	4	3	10
Karate	3	3	7	13
Chess	2	6	1	9
Muay	2	4	4	10
Boxing	2	1	5	8
Archery	2	1	0	3
Weightlifting	1	5	3	9
Rowing	1	3	2	6
Billiards and Snooker	1	1	6	8
Cycling	1	1	3	5
Bodybuilding	1	1	1	3
Pétanque	0	2	8	10
Canoeing	0	2	5	7
Futsal	0	2	0	2
Table tennis	0	1	3	4
Volleyball	0	1	1	2
Football	0	1	0	1
Badminton	0	0	2	2
Sepak takraw	0	0	1	1
Total	74	85	86	245

== Medalists ==
Medal	Name	Sport	Event	Date
Gold	Nguyen Trong Cuong	Taekwondo	Men's -87 kg	December 21
Gold	Ho Minh Tam	Vovinam	Men's 65 kg	December 21
Gold	Nguyen Thi Kim Hoang	Vovinam	Women's 55 kg	December 21
Gold	Nguyen Thi Ngoc	Muay	Women's 60 kg	December 21
Gold	Bui Yen Ly	Muay	Women's 51 kg	December 21
Gold	Le Duong Lan Phuong; Tran Thi My Duyen	Kenpō	Women's Kumi Embu (Artistic) Pair Yudansha	December 21
Gold	Do Hong Ngoc	Kenpō	Women's 48 kg	December 21
Gold	Nguyen Thi Quyen Chan	Vovinam	Women's 60 kg	December 20
Gold	Le Huynh Chau	Taekwondo	Men's 63 kg	December 20
Gold	Ho Ngan Giang	Judo	Men's 55–60 kg	December 19
Gold	Van Ngoc Tu	Judo	Women's 45–48 kg	December 19
Gold	Do Thi Thao	Athletics	Women's 1500m	December 19
Gold	Duong Van Thai	Athletics	Men's 1500m	December 19
Gold	Nguyen Duy Khanh	Vovinam	Men's 55–60 kg	December 19
Gold	Tran Khanh Trang	Vovinam	Women's 45–50 kg	December 19
Gold	Nguyen Van Hung	Athletics	Men's triple jump	December 19
Gold	Duong Thi Viet Anh	Athletics	Women's high jump	December 19
Gold	Nguyen Van Cuong; Nguyen Binh Dinh; Tran Cong Tao; Huynh Khac Nguyen	Vovinam	Men's DON CHAN TAN CONG(LEG ATTACK TECHNIQUE)	December 19
Gold	Nguyen Van Lai	Athletics	Men's 10000m	December 19
Gold	Huynh Thong Nhat	Judo	Men's -55 kg	December 18
Gold	Vu Thi Huong	Athletics	Women's 200m	December 18
Gold	Pham Thi Thu Hien	Taekwondo	Women's 57–62 kg	December 18
Gold	Phan Thi Kieu Duyen; Pham Thi Mao	Kenpō	Women's Kumi Embu (Artistic) Pair Kyu Kenshi	December 18
Gold	Nguyen Dinh Toan; Nguyen Minh Tu	Taekwondo	Mixed Pair	December 18
Gold	Nguyen Thi Le Kim; Nguyen Thi Thu Ngan; Chau Tuyet Van	Taekwondo	Women's Poomsae (Team)	December 18
Gold	Nguyen Ngoc Truong Son	Chess	Men's international Individual Rapid	December 17
Gold	Le Ngoc Mai; Trieu Thi Hoa Hong; Nguyen Thuy Dung	Shooting	Women's 25m Air Pistol Team	December 17
Gold	Do Thi Thao	Athletics	Women's 800m	December 17
Gold	Vu Thi Huong	Athletics	Women's 100m	December 17
Gold	Nguyen Van Lai	Athletics	Men's 5000m	December 17
Gold	Hoang Quy Phuoc	Swimming	Men's 200m freestyle	December 16
Gold	Nguyen Thi Anh Vien	Swimming	Women's 400m Individual medley	December 16
Gold	Mai Nguyen Hung; Le Van Duan; Trinh Duc Tam; Nguyen Thanh Tam	Cycling	Men's road race 100 km team Time Trial	December 16
Gold	Le Thi An; Tran Thi Sam	Rowing	Women's LW2-	December 16
Gold	Loc Thi Dao; Dao Trong Kien	Archery	Mixed Team recurve	December 16
Gold	Nguyen Tien Cuong	Archery	Men's compound Individual	December 16
Gold	Pham Thi Binh	Athletics	Women's marathon	December 16
Gold	Lam Quang Nhat	Swimming	Men's 1500m freestyle	December 15
Gold	Dang Dinh Tien	Billiards and Snooker	1 Cushion Carom Single	December 15
Gold	Hoang Xuan Vinh; Ho Hoang Hai; Nguyen Hoang Phuong; Tran Quoc Cuong	Shooting	Men's 10m air pistol Team	December 15
Gold	Nguyen Thi Yen	Pencak silat	Women's 70–75 kg	December 15
Gold	Nguyen Duy Tien	Pencak silat	Men's 75–80 kg	December 15
Gold	Le Sy Kien	Pencak silat	Men's 80–85 kg	December 15
Gold	Vu Thi Nguyet Anh	Karate	Women's individual kumite -50 kg	December 14
Gold	Nguyen Van Lam	Bodybuilding	Men's 70 kg	December 14
Gold	Ha Thi Linh	Boxing	Women's 64 kg	December 14
Gold	Luu Thi Duyen	Boxing	Women's 51 kg	December 14
Gold	Nguyen Ngoc Truong Son	Chess	Men's international individual blitz	December 14
Gold	Nguyen Minh Chau	Shooting	Women's 10m air pistol	December 14
Gold	Le Thi Hoang Ngoc; Nguyen Minh Chau; Trieu Thi Hoa Hong	Shooting	Women's 10m air pistol Team	December 14
Gold	Vu Thi Hang	Wrestling	Women's Free Style -48 kg	December 13
Gold	Can Tat Du	Wrestling	Men's Free Style -74 kg	December 13
Gold	Thach Kim Tuan	Weightlifting	Men's 56 kg	December 13
Gold	Lang Thi Hoa	Karate	Women's individual kumite +68 kg	December 13
Gold	Nguyen Hoang Ngan	Karate	Women's individual Kata	December 13
Gold	Hoang Xuan Vinh; Tran Quoc Cuong; Nguyen Hoang Phuong	Shooting	Men's 50m Free Pistol Team	December 13
Gold	Nguyen Thi Anh Vien	Swimming	Women's 200m backstroke	December 12
Gold	Nguyen Thi Anh Vien	Swimming	Women's 200m individual medley	December 12
Gold	Nguyen Thi Lua	Wrestling	Women's Free Style -51 kg	December 12
Gold	Nguyen Huy Ha	Wrestling	Men's Free Style -55 kg	December 12
Gold	Nguyen The Anh	Wrestling	Men's Free Style -60 kg	December 12
Gold	Bui Tuan Anh	Wrestling	Men's Free Style -66 kg	December 12
Gold	Nguyen Thanh Dat	Shooting	50m rifle prone Men	December 11
Gold	Pham Thi Loan	Wrestling	Women's Free Style -59 kg	December 10
Gold	Pham Thi Hue	Wrestling	Women's Free Style -55 kg	December 10
Gold	Pham Quoc Khanh	Wushu	Men's NANGUN	December 10
Gold	Đới Đăng Tiến	Wrestling	Men's Greco -55 kg	December 9
Gold	Tran Van Tuong	Wrestling	Men's Greco -66 kg	December 9
Gold	Nguyen Thi Chinh	Wushu	Women's sanshou 48 kg	December 9
Gold	Nguyen Thu Hoai	Wushu	Women's sanshou 52 kg	December 9
Gold	Hoang Thi Phuong Giang	Wushu	Women's taolu CHANGQUAN	December 8
Gold	Duong Thuy Vi	Wushu	Women's taolu JIANSHU	December 7
Silver	Nguyen Thuy Duong	Kenpō	Women's 51 kg	December 21
Silver	Bui Thi Quynh	Muay	Women's 48 kg	December 21
Silver	Nguyen Ngo Trieu Nhat	Muay	Men's 51 kg	December 21
Silver	Nguyen Phu Hien	Muay	Men's 57 kg	December 21
Silver	Phan Thi Ngoc Linh	Muay	Women's 57 kg	December 21
Silver	Dinh Quang Duc	Taekwondo	Men's +87 kg	December 21
Silver	Le Tien Dat	Table Tennis	Men's singles	December 21
Silver	Women's team	Volleyball	Women's volleyball indoor	December 21
Silver	Dang Hao	Judo	Men's -100 kg	December 21
Silver	Nguyen Thi Nhu Y	Judo	Women's -78 kg	December 21
Silver	Doan Thi Huong Giang	Taekwondo	Women's -49 kg	December 20
Silver	Nguyen Thanh Thao	Taekwondo	Women's -53 kg	December 20
Silver	Tran Anh Tuan	Vovinam	Men's -55 kg	December 20
Silver	Lam Dong Vuong; Tran Cong Tao; Huynh Khac Nguyen; Nguyen Van Cuong	Vovinam	Men's DA LUYEN VU KHI NAM(WEAPON SELF-DEFENCE FOR MAN)	December 20
Silver	Lam Dong Vuong; Tran The Thuong	Vovinam	Men's SONG LUYEN MA TAU(DUAL MACHETE FORM)	December 20
Silver	Hua Le Cam Xuan	Vovinam	Women's LONG HO QUYEN(DRAGON TIGER FORM)	December 20
Silver	Hua Le Cam Xuan; Mai Thi Kim Thuy	Vovinam	Women's SONG LUYEN KIEM(DUAL SWORD FORM)	December 20
Silver	Le Duong Lan Phuong; Le Hoang Dieu; Nguyen Thanh Bao Mi; Phan Thi Kieu Duyen; Pham Thi Mao; Tran Thi My Duyen; Le Thi Thu Hang	Kenpō	Women's Dantai Embu (Artistic) Group 8	December 20
Silver	Hoang Thi Nhu Y Dao Thien Hai	Chess	Mixed pair transfer blitz	December 20
Silver	Những cô gái vàng	Football	Women's Football	December 20
Silver	Women's team	Futsal	Women's Futsal	December 20
Silver	Men's team	Futsal	Men's Futsal	December 20
Silver	Bui Thi Hoa	Judo	Women's -63 kg	December 20
Silver	Hua Le Cam Xuan; Pham Thi Bich Phuong	Vovinam	Women's SONG LUYEN3 (DUAL FORM)	December 19
Silver	Mai Thi Kim Thuy	Vovinam	Women's TINH HOA LUONG NGHI KIEM PHAP(YIN YANG SWORD FORM)	December 19
Silver	Nguyen Dinh Loc	Judo	Men's -66 kg	December 19
Silver	Nguyen Thanh Hien	Taekwondo	Women's -67 kg	December 19
Silver	Pham Tien San	Athletics	Men's 3000m–steeplechase	December 18
Silver	Nguyen Thi Oanh	Athletics	Women's 3000m–steeplechase	December 18
Silver	Dao Van Thuy	Athletics	Men's high jump	December 18
Silver	Nguyen Viet Quoc; Nguyen Thanh Bao Mi	Kenpō	Mixed Kumi Embu (Artistic) Pair Kyu Kenshi	December 18
Silver	Le Thi Thu Hang	Kenpō	Women's -57 kg	December 18
Silver	Le Ngoc Van Anh; Nguyen Hoang Cam Ha	Judo	Women's Ju-No Kata	December 18
Silver	Dao Thien Hai; Nguyen Van Huy	Chess	Men's pair transfer blitz	December 18
Silver	Mai Nguyen Hung	Cycling	Men's road race 163 km Individual	December 18
Silver	Vu Thi Huong; Nguyen Thi Ngoc Tham; Mai Thi Phuong; Do Thi Quyen	Athletics	Women's 4 × 100 m Relay	December 16
Silver	Nguyen Dinh Huy; Duong Thanh Binh; Pham Minh Chinh; Nguyen Van Linh	Rowing	Men's LM2x	December 16
Silver	Pham Thi Thao; Pham Thi Hai	Rowing	Women's LW2x	December 16
Silver	Tran Van Hoa	Weightlifting	Men's -94 kg	December 16
Silver	Tran Duy Khoi	Aquatics	Men's 200m Individual medley	December 13
Silver	Nguyen Thi Anh Vien	Aquatics	Women's 400m freestyle	December 13
Silver	Le Quang Trung	Wrestling		December 13
Silver	Hoang Quy Phuoc	Aquatics	Men's 100m freestyle	December 13
Silver	Nguyen Danh Phuong; Dang Quoc Bao	Pencak silat		December 13
Silver	Nguyen Hoang Ngan; Do Thi Thu Ha; Nguyen Thanh Hang	Karate		December 13
Silver	Nguyen Thanh Quang	Canoeing	Men's MK 500m	December 12
Silver	Nguyen Thanh Dat; Phung Le Huyen; Nguyen Duy Hoang	Shooting	50m rifle prone Men Team	December 11
Silver	Nguyen Thi Mai; Kieu Thi Hao; Nguyen Thi Duyen; Nguyen Thi Le	Canoeing	Women's WK 4 1000m	December 10
Silver	Duong Thuy Vi	Wushu	Women's taolu QUIANGSHU	December 9
Silver	Nguyen Manh Quyen	Wushu	Men's taolu DAOSHU	December 9
Silver	Bui Minh Phuong	Wushu	Women's taolu NANQUAN	December 7
Bronze	Huynh Thanh Thuy	Kenpō	Women's 54 kg	December 21
Bronze	Nguyen Kim Nguyen	Kenpō	Men's 55 kg	December 21
Bronze	Nguyen The Thuong	Vovinam	Men's NGU MON QUYEN(FIVE GATES FORM)	December 21
Bronze	Mai Dinh Chien; Tran The Thuong; Pham Thi Bich Phuong; Tran Ngoc Nam	Vovinam	Mixed DA LUYEN VU KHI NU(WEAPON SELF-DEFENCE FOR WOMAN)	December 21
Bronze	Mai Hoang My Trang	Table Tennis	Women's singles	December 21
Bronze	Cao Phu Thinh; Nguyen Xuan Loc; Phan The An; Vu Khang Duy	Pétanque	Men's Triple Match	December 21
Bronze	Nguyen Tan Cong	Judo	Men's -75 kg	December 20
Bronze	To Hai Long	Judo	Men's -81 kg	December 20
Bronze	Ho Thi Nhu Van	Judo	Women's -57 kg	December 20
Bronze	Men's team	Volleyball	Men's volleyball indoor	December 20
Bronze	Lam Thi Ha Thanh	Taekwondo	Women's -57 kg	December 19
Bronze	Dao Duy Hoang; Le Tien Dat; Duong Van Nam; Nguyen Van Ngoc	Table Tennis	Men's team	December 19
Bronze	Mai Hoang My Trang; Phan Hoang Tuong Giang; Nguyen The Viet Linh; Nguyễn Thị Nga	Table Tennis	Women's team	December 19
Bronze	Huynh Cong Tam; Nguyen Thi Hien; Tran Thi Phuong Em	Pétanque	Triple (M-1 & W-2)	December 19
Bronze	Ly Ngoc Tai; Mai Huu Phuoc; Thach Phanara	Pétanque	Triple (M-2 & W-1)	December 19
Bronze	Le Anh Minh	Taekwondo	Men's Poomsae(Single)	December 18
Bronze	Duong Thanh Tam	Taekwondo	Men's 74 kg	December 18
Bronze	Bui Thi Thu Thao	Athletics	Women's long jump	December 18
Bronze	Nguyen Thi Oanh	Athletics	Women's 200m	December 18
Bronze	Bui Thi Xuan	Athletics	Women's javelin throw	December 18
Bronze	Nguyễn Anh Tuấn	Billiards and Snooker	Men's 10 Ball Pool Single	December 18
Bronze	Dang Thanh Kien	Billiards and Snooker	Men's 10 Ball Pool Single	December 18
Bronze	Nguyen Tien Minh	Badminton	Men's singles	December 13
Bronze	Vu Thi Thuy Trang	Badminton	Women's singles	December 13
Bronze	Son Thi Chanh Tha	Pétanque		December 13
Bronze	Ho Quoc Phu; Thach Tuan Thanh	Pétanque		December 13
Bronze	Nguyen Thanh Quang	Canoeing		December 13
Bronze	Dinh Thi Nhu Quynh	Cycling		December 13
Bronze	Tran Van Long	Canoeing		December 13
Bronze	Tran Duy Khoi	Aquatics	Men's 400m individual medley	December 12
Bronze	Nguyen Thi Mai; Kieu Thi Hao; Nguyen Thi Duyen; Nguyen Thi Le	Canoeing	Women's kayak 500m	December 12
Bronze	Ha The Long; Nguyen Van Quang; Cao Thi Cam Le; Dinh Thi Nhu Quynh	Cycling	Team Mountain Bike Cross Country(Relay)	December 12
Bronze	Khong Van Khoa	Wrestling	Men's Greco -74 kg	December 10
Bronze	Luu Van Vung; Nguyen Thanh Sang	Canoeing	Men's C2 1000m	December 10
Bronze	Pham Sy Thu	Wrestling	Men's Greco -60 kg	December 9
Bronze	Pham Quoc Khanh	Wushu	Men's NANDO	December 9
Bronze	To Van Bau	Wushu	Men's session 2 48 kg	December 8
Bronze	Hoang Van Cao	Wushu	Men's session 2 56 kg	December 8
Bronze	Tran Xuan Hiep	Wushu	Men's CHANGQUAN	December 7
