= Thailand at the 2013 SEA Games =

Thailand at the 2013 Southeast Asian Games
- IOC code: THA
- NOC: National Olympic Committee of Thailand
- Website: www.olympicthai.or.th/eng (in English and Thai)

in Naypyidaw
- Competitors: 746
- Flag bearer: Suphawut Thueanklang (futsal)
- Medals Ranked 1st: Gold 107 Silver 94 Bronze 80 Total 281

Southeast Asian Games appearances (overview)
- 1961; 1965; 1967; 1969; 1971; 1973; 1975; 1977; 1979; 1981; 1983; 1985; 1987; 1989; 1991; 1993; 1995; 1997; 1999; 2001; 2003; 2005; 2007; 2009; 2011; 2013; 2015; 2017; 2019; 2021; 2023; 2025; 2027; 2029

Thailand competed at the 2013 Southeast Asian Games. The 27th Southeast Asian Games took place in Naypyidaw, the capital of Myanmar, as well as in two other main cities, Yangon and Mandalay.

== Medal ==
=== Medal table ===
Sport	Gold	Silver	Bronze	Total
Archery	0	3	2	5
Athletics	17	13	9	39
Badminton	1	2	3	6
Basketball	1	1	0	2
Billiards and Snooker	4	1	2	7
Bodybuilding	1	1	1	3
Boxing	7	2	1	10
Canoeing	5	2	5	12
Chess	7	5	4	16
Chinlone	2	4	0	6
Cycling	3	6	3	12
Equestrian	0	1	1	2
Field hockey	0	1	0	1
Football	2	0	0	2
Futsal	2	0	0	2
Golf	2	0	2	4
Judo	7	1	4	12
Karate	2	0	4	6
Muay	4	2	3	9
Pencak silat	2	1	7	10
Petanque	3	4	2	9
Rowing	0	1	2	3
Sailing	4	5	2	11
Sepak takraw	6	0	0	6
Shooting	2	2	2	6
Swimming	7	8	8	23
Table tennis	0	2	0	2
Taekwondo	6	5	4	15
Traditional boat race	1	11	4	16
Volleyball	2	0	0	2
Water Polo	0	0	1	1
Weightlifting	6	1	2	9
Wrestling	1	7	1	9
Wushu	0	2	1	3
Total	107	94	80	281

=== Medals by date ===
Daily: Overall Medals
Day	Date	Gold medal	Silver medal	Bronze medal	Total
Day 1	4th	0	2	0	2
Day 2	5th	2	0	0	2
Day 3	6th	0	0	0	0
Day 4	7th	0	0	1	1
Day 5	8th	0	2	0	2
Day 6	9th	1	4	0	5
Day 7	10th	2	3	3	8
Day 8*	11th	1	1	0	2
Day 9	12th	2	3	6	11
Day 10	13th	13	10	7	30
Day 11	14th	12	4	11	27
Day 12	15th	12	12	12	36
Day 13	16th	14	4	9	27
Day 14	17th	5	10	5	20
Day 15	18th	9	11	8	28
Day 16	19th	9	14	4	27
Day 17	20th	12	9	6	27
Day 18	21st	13	5	8	26
Day 19**	22nd	0	0	0	0

* Opening ceremony ** Closing ceremony

== Medalists ==
Medal	Name	Sport	Event	Date
Gold	Thailand	Chinlone	Men's TheSame strokes	05 Dec
Gold	Thailand	Chinlone	Women's TheSame strokes	05 Dec
Gold	PRAVAN RITISAK	Wrestling	Men's Greco -60 kg	09 Dec
Gold	NARACHAI CHUMEUNGKUSOL; WATTANA JAIYEN; EKACHAI MASUK; SAHARAT UONUMPAI; CHAIYA WATTANO; THANAIWAT YOOSUK	Sepaktakraw	Men's Hooptakraw	10 Dec
Gold	ADITEP SRICHART; WICHAN JAITIENG; KASEMSIT BORRIBOONWASIN; NATHAWORN WAENPHROM	Canoeing	Men's MK 4 1000m	10 Dec
Gold	MAJCHARCHEEP TAVARIT; TORTUNGPANICH NAPIS; UEA AREE ATTAPON	Shooting	50m rifle prone Men Team	11 Dec
Gold	CHOTPHIBUNSIN THANYALAK; PICHITKANJANAKUL VITCHUDA; PLENGSAENGTHONG RATCHADAPORN	Shooting	50m rifle prone Men Team	12 Dec
Gold	KASEMSIT BORRIBOONWASIN	Canoeing	Men's MK 1,500m	12 Dec
Gold	NONGNUCH INRUENGSORN; WANWISA JANKAEN; THITIMA MAHAKUSOL; SUDAPORN PALANG; SOMRUEDEE PRUEPRUK; KAEWJAI PUMSAwWANGKAEW; SUNTHARI RUPSUNG; THIDARAT SODA; PAYOM SRIHONGSA; JONGRAK SRISAMAI; RUNGTIP TANAKING; DARANEE WONGCHARERN	Sepaktakraw	Women's team	13 Dec
Gold	ANUWAT CHAICHANA; THANAWAT CHUMSENA; SOMPORN JAISINGHOL; PORNCHAI KAOKAEW; SITTIPONG KHAMCHAN; SUPACHAI MANEENAT; SURIYAN PEACHAN; SIRIWAT SAKHA; SAHACHAT SAKHONCHAROEN; KRITSANA TANAKORN; ASSADIN WONGYOTA; PATTARAPONG YUPADEE	Sepaktakraw	Men's team	13 Dec
Gold	PHUSA AT THALOENGKIAT; PIACHAN SUKSAN	Petanque	Men's Double	13 Dec
Gold	KASEMSIT BORRIBOONWASIN	Canoeing	Men's MK 1,500m	13 Dec
Gold	CHAWCHIANGKWANG PEERAPOL	Cycling	Men's Mountain Bike Cross Country(4 km per lap)	13 Dec
Gold	SUWAN PAIROJ; SUTTHITHAMWASI NUT; LAKARNCHUA CHATUPORN; TIMSRI WORATHEP	Chess	Men's traditional team rapid	13 Dec
Gold	KASEMSIT BORRIBOONWASIN	Canoeing	Men's MK 1,200m	13 Dec
Gold	RUNGSAWAN SUANSAN	Canoeing	Men's C1 200m	13 Dec
Gold	PHANUDET PHETMIKHA; NARES NAOPRAKON	Canoeing	Men's C2 200m	13 Dec
Gold	ISSARA KACHAIWONG; PRAMUAL JANTAD	Billiard and Snooker	Snooker Double	13 Dec
Gold	JUNKRAJANG NATTHANAN	Swimming	Women's 100m freestyle	13 Dec
Gold	MATJIUR RADOMYOS	Swimming	Men's 100m breaststroke	13 Dec
Gold	SRIPHANOMTHORN BENJAPORN	Swimming	Women's 400m freestyle	13 Dec
Gold	SRISA ARD JENJIRA; KITTIYA PATARAWADEE; SRIPHANOMTHORN BENJAPORN; JUNKRAJANG NATTHANAN	Swimming	Women's 4 × 100 m freestyle relay	13 Dec
Gold	PORNCHAI LOBSI	Weightlifting	Men's 77 kg	14 Dec
Gold	DEEKABALLES VIPAVEE	Cycling	Women's Mountain Bike Down Hill 1.5 km	14 Dec
Gold	SOPIDA SATUMRUM	Boxing	Women's 51 kg	14 Dec
Gold	CHATCHAI BUTDEE	Boxing	Men's 52 kg	14 Dec
Gold	SAYIOM ARDEE	Boxing	Men's 60 kg	14 Dec
Gold	WUTTICHAI MASUK	Boxing	Men's 64 kg	14 Dec
Gold	JIRAPHAN PONGKAM	Body Building	Men's 55 kg 2013	14 Dec
Gold	SAENSOMBOONSUK TANONGNAK	Badminton	Men's singles	14 Dec
Gold	SUKANYA SRISURAT	Weightlifting	Women's 58 kg	15 Dec
Gold	PITAYA TIBNOKE	Weightlifting	Men's 85 kg	15 Dec
Gold	PIMSIRI SIRIKAEW	Weightlifting	Women's 63 kg	15 Dec
Gold	THAMAKORD THONGSRI; WONGCHUVEJ PHANTIPHA	Petanque	Women's Double	15 Dec
Gold	REWADEE DAMSRI	Pencak Silat	Women's 55–60 kg	15 Dec
Gold	NANTHACHAI KHANSAKHON	Pencak Silat	Men's 50–55 kg	15 Dec
Gold	DAMRONGVEERAVIT ANUWAT; SARATHAM PHOLWASIN; SAWANGSRI PIYANGKUL; MUNTAEN SONGVUT; NGAMPHUENGPHIT SUPA; TAKHIEO SUTTHICHAI; KANGTONG THEERAPAT	Karatedo	Men's team kumite	15 Dec
Gold	SUKANYA CHOMCHUENDEE	Athletics	Women's pole vault	15 Dec
Gold	TANTIPONG PHETCHAIYA	Athletics	Men's hammer throw	15 Dec
Gold	TREEWADEE YONGPHAN	Athletics	Women's 400m	15 Dec
Gold	KETIN NUTTAPONG	Swimming	Men's 200m breaststroke	15 Dec
Gold	JUNKRAJANG NATTHANAN	Swimming	Women's 200m freestyle	15 Dec
Gold	SARAT SUMPRADIT	Weightlifting	Men's 94 kg	16 Dec
Gold	BOONATEE KLKASIKIT	Weightlifting	Women's 69 kg	16 Dec
Gold	WANWISA JANKAEN; SASIWAMOL JANTHASIT; KAEWJAL PUMSAWANGKAEW; SUNTHAIRI RUPSUNG; PAYOM SRIHONGSA	Sepaktakraw	Women's regu	16 Dec
Gold	THANAWAT CHUMSENA; PORNCHAI KAOKAEW; KSIRIWAT SAKHA; SAHACHAI SAKHONCHAROEN; PATTARAPONG YUPADEE	Sepaktakraw	Men's regu	16 Dec
Gold	LEKCHAM SUPAT; SUTTHITHAMWASI NUT; BOONRUAMBOON ARCH; TIMSRI WORATHEP	Chess	Men's traditional team blitz	16 Dec
Gold	PRAPRUT CHAITHANASAKUN; SURIYA SUWANNASINGH	Billiard and Snooker	English Scotch Billiards Double	16 Dec
Gold	BANMOO NARUEMOL; CHAMNARNWAREE CHALISA; CHIRDPETCHARAT CHONTICHA; JANTAKAN JUTAMAS; JANTHABUT PATTRAWADEE; KUNCHUAN SUPAWADEE; MAIHOM THIDAPORN; MATHUROS JUTHATHIP; PHETSAENKHA KLOYJAI; SANGTAD SUWIMON; TUNSAW NOMJIT; YOTHANAN PENPHAN	Basketball	Women's team	16 Dec
Gold	RUTTANAPON SOWAN; APHISIT PROMKAEW; JIRAPONG MEENAPRA; SUPPACHAI CHIMDEE	Athletics	Men's 4 × 100 m Relay	16 Dec
Gold	PHATSORN JAKSUNINKORN; NEERANUCH KLOMDEE; TASSAPORN WANNAKIT; NONGNUCH SANRAT	Athletics	Women's 4 × 100 m Relay	16 Dec
Gold	KREETA SINTAWACHEEWA	Athletics	Men's pole vault	16 Dec
Gold	WASSANA WINATHO	Athletics	Women's Heptathlon	16 Dec
Silver	Thailand	Chinlone	Women Linking	04 Dec
Silver	JEMPHARA EEKKAWEE; PRASERT KAMOL; RUNGROT KHANAWUT; LONON KOMIN; NALLAONG KOSOL; DNGTHAWTHONG NOPPATON; ETHON PONGPHAN; RISAWAT WITSARUT	Chinlone	Men Non-Repetition(Secondary level)	09 Dec
Silver	POYIM GATESINEE; PLABWANGKLAM KANYARAT; JAISUE YAOWVALUX; JAISUE YAOWARES; SUKCHIT WIPHADA; PAENTHONG PORNPAIRIN; SOCHAIYAN KANTINAN; JIRAPORN PALASRi	Chinlone	Women Non-Repetition(Secondary level)	09 Dec
Silver	PHITHAK PAOKRATHOK	Wushu	Men 52 kg	09 Dec
Silver	TOM SUEPSANGAT	Wushu	Men 56 kg	09 Dec
Silver	SIRITHAHAN ATTHAPHOL	Wrestling	Men's Greco -74 kg	10 Dec
Silver	MUANGPOR MALIWAN	Wrestling	Women's Free Style -55 kg	10 Dec
Silver	SRISOMBAT SALINEE	Wrestling	Women's Free Style -59 kg	10 Dec
Silver	TORTUNGPANICH NAPIS	Shooting	50m rifle prone Men	11 Dec
Silver	CHOTPHIBUNSIN THANYALAK	Shooting	50m rifle prone Women Individual	12 Dec
Silver	CHAWCHIANGKWANG PEERAPOL; SUPRASART KEERATI; WARAPIANG SIRILUCK; WONG PADKLANG JUTAMAS	Cycling	Team Mountain Bike Cross Country(Relay)	12 Dec
Silver	SUWAN PAIROJ	Chess	Men's Traditional Individual Rapid	12 Dec
Silver	PASAWANG TADSAPOL	Wrestling	Men's Free Style -74 kg	13 Dec
Silver	TEPAKAM METHEE	Wrestling	Men's Free Style -96 kg	13 Dec
Silver	PIMPAK SUREEPORN	Wrestling	Women's Free Style -44 kg	13 Dec
Silver	THO KAEW SRIPRAPA	Wrestling	Women's Free Style -48 kg	13 Dec
Silver	PANIDA KHAMSRI	Weightlifting	Women's 48 kg	13 Dec
Silver	NATTANIN SORNSOONTHORN	Pencak Silat	Women's artistic single	13 Dec
Silver	WONG PADKLANG JUTAMAS	Cycling	Men's Mountain Bike Cross Country(4 km per lap)	13 Dec
Silver	KANOKPAN SUANSAN	Canoeing	Women's WK 1,200m	13 Dec
Silver	WORAPORN BOONYUHONG; MANITA NETPROM; KANOKPAN SUANSAN; PATTRALUCK PHUMSATAN	Canoeing	Women's WK 4 200m	13 Dec
Silver	SALUBLUEK CHAVUNNOOCH	Swimming	Women's 100m breaststroke	13 Dec
Silver	SUDAPORAN SEESONDEE	Boxing	Women's 60 kg	14 Dec
Silver	DONCHAI THATHI	Boxing	Men's 56 kg	14 Dec
Silver	ONGBAMRUNGPHAN BUSANAN	Badminton	Women's singles	14 Dec
Silver	JONGJIT MANEEPONG; TAERATTANACHAI SAPSIREE	Badminton	Mixed doubles	14 Dec
Silver	SONTHUNG WATTANACHAI	Petanque	Men's Single	15 Dec
Silver	NONTASIN CHANPENG	Cycling	Women's road race 30 km (19 mi) Individual Time Trial	15 Dec
Silver	KHUNTAL PHUANGPHET	Body Building	Men's 80 kg	15 Dec
Silver	PRAPRUT CHAITHANASAKUN; THAWAT SUJARITTHURAKARN	Billiard and Snooker	English Billiards Team	15 Dec
Silver	NARONG BENJAROON	Athletics	Men's discus throw	15 Dec
Silver	SUPANARA SUKHASVASTI NA AYUDHAY	Athletics	Men's long jump	15 Dec
Silver	SALUBLUEK CHAVUNNOOCH	Swimming	Women's 200m breaststroke	15 Dec
Silver	MATJIUR RADOMYOS	Swimming	Men's 200m breaststroke	15 Dec
Silver	JUNKRAJANG NATTHANAN; SALUBLUEK CHAVUNNOOCH; SOUNTHORNCHOTE SUPASUTA; SRIPHANOMTHORN BENJAPORN	Swimming	Women's 4 × 100 m medley relay	15 Dec
Silver	BOONRATANATHANAKORN THURAKIT; LIPHONGYU NAVUTI; SAIUDOMSIN PHUCHONG; SIRIRONNACHAI SARAWUT	Cycling	Men's road race 100 km (62 mi) Team Time Trial	16 Dec
Silver	APIROMVILAICHAI DARONGPAT; APIROMVILAICHAI DARUNPONG; DASOM WUTIPONG; GHOGAR SUKHDAVE; JANTUMA MANA; KAEDUM CHAIWAT; KLAEWNARONG ANASAWEE; KLAHAN CHANACHON; KONGKUM DANAI; KRUATIWA RATDECH; LERTLAOKUL KANNAWAT; SUTTISIN WATTANA	Basketball	Men's team	16 Dec
Silver	CHATACHOT NITIPHUM	Archery	Men's compound Individual	16 Dec
Silver	JUNKRAJANG NATTHANAN	Swimming	Women's 50m freestyle	16 Dec
Bronze	BARAMEE KULSAWADMONGKOL; PITAYA SAE YANG; SUJINDA SAE YANG	Wushu	Men's DUILIAN (1)	07 Dec
Bronze	KANCHALEE CHINNAWET	Wrestling	Men's Greco -84 kg	10 Dec
Bronze	WORAPORN BOONYUHONG; MANITA NETPROM; KANOKPAN SUANSAN; PATTRALUCK PHUMSATAN	Canoeing	Men's MK 4 1000m	10 Dec
Bronze	NARUEDON NIWASAKUL; PINIT CHAISOMBAT; PATTANIT CHOMPOOSANG; METHAT SRISABAI; PATIPOL PHANDPHOUNG (C); RONNAKRIT JARANANON; MEATHUS CHETAMEE; KANAWAT WATTANARUNGRUANG; NATTHAPHON SANGWORATHAM; SORNTHUM WONGPAIROJ; TERDTONG KLINUBOL; THANAYUT KINGSAKUL; WANJAK SUWANCHART	Water polo	Men Team	10 Dec
Bronze	PLENGSAENGTHONG RATCHADAPORN	Shooting	50m rifle prone Women Individual	12 Dec
Bronze	TIMSRI WORATHIP	Chess	Men's Traditional Individual Rapid	12 Dec
Bronze	RUNGSAWAN SUANSAN	Canoeing	Men's C1 1,500m	12 Dec
Bronze	KANOKPAN SUANSAN	Canoeing	Women's WK 1,500m	12 Dec
Bronze	WORAPORN BOONYUHONG; PATTRALUCK PHUMSATAN	Canoeing	Women's WK 1,500m	12 Dec
Bronze	PHANUDET PHETMIKHA; NARES NAOPRAKON	Canoeing	Men's C2 500m	12 Dec
Bronze	YOOTHONG NATTAYA	Petanque	Women's WK 1,500m	13 Dec
Bronze	ILYAS SADARA	Pencak Silat	Men's artistic single	13 Dec
Bronze	TAKHIEO SUTTHACHAI	Karatedo	Men's individual kumite +84 kg	13 Dec
Bronze	SUPRASART KEERATI	Cycling	Men's Mountain Bike Cross Country(4 km per lap)	13 Dec
Bronze	PHITCHAYAROM RUJA; LAORCHEM KORANAN; BOOTCHON KORADA; ATIKANKHOTCHASEE MANUMTHON	Chess	Women's traditional team rapid	13 Dec
Bronze	PAWAPOTAKO PHIANGKHWAN	Swimming	Women's 100m breaststroke	13 Dec
Bronze	TAIRAT BUNSUK	Weightlifting	Men's 69 kg	14 Dec
Bronze	NUMTAEN SONGVUT	Karatedo	Men's individual kumite -75 kg	14 Dec
Bronze	KHAMSI TIPPAWAN	Karatedo	Women's individual kumite -55 kg	14 Dec
Bronze	RAKSACHART PAWEENA	Karatedo	Women's individual kumite -50 kg	14 Dec
Bronze	SUKCHANYA SUEBSAKUN	Cycling	Men's Mountain Bike Down Hill 1.5 km	14 Dec
Bronze	ABDULKAREE SATTAYANUN	Cycling	Men's Mountain Bike Down Hill 1.5 km	14 Dec
Bronze	TASSAMALEE THONGJAN	Boxing	Women's 57 kg	14 Dec
Bronze	NITCHAON JINDAPOL	Badminton	Women's singles	14 Dec
Bronze	SUPAJIRAKUL PUTTITA; TAERATTANACHAI SAPSIREE	Badminton	Women's doubles	14 Dec
Bronze	SUPAJIRAKUL PUTTITA; PUANGPUAPECH NIPITPHON	Badminton	Mixed doubles	14 Dec
Bronze	KITTIYA TANAKRIT	Swimming	Men's 400m freestyle	14 Dec
Bronze	JUNKRAJANG NATTANAN	Swimming	Women's 100m backstroke	14 Dec
Bronze	WESSHASARTAR NAPAT; NIGKANONT PAPUNGKORN; PHODUANG CHOLAWAT; TIEWONG SARIT	Swimming	Men's 4 × 100 m freestyle relay	14 Dec
Bronze	SUCHAT SOMBOON	Weightlifting	Men's 85 kg	15 Dec
Bronze	MONRUTHAI BANGSALAD	Pencak Silat	Women's 70–75 kg	15 Dec
Bronze	PANJA NGOENTIM	Pencak Silat	Men's 45–50 kg	15 Dec
Bronze	SOMKID RAKJUN	Pencak Silat	Men's 65–70 kg	15 Dec
Bronze	KATAHAT RAKSAPON	Pencak Silat	Men's 75–80 kg	15 Dec
Bronze	WACHARAPONG INTHO	Pencak Silat	Men's 80–85 kg	15 Dec
Bronze	SAKDA OMKAEO	Pencak Silat	Men's 60–65 kg	15 Dec
Bronze	PANUPONG PRATEEP	Body Building	Men's 90 kg	15 Dec
Bronze	SAWITRI THONGCHAO	Athletics	Women's shot put	15 Dec
Bronze	LEWIS GAVIN ALEXANDER	Swimming	Men's 50m freestyle	15 Dec
Bronze	PORNTAWAT INLEE; SAJJA HEAMHERN	Rowing	Men's LM2x	16 Dec
Bronze	CHANNARONG PHOLKAEW; SOMPORN MUEANGKHOT; YOTHIN KRITKANGNOK; JARUWAT SAENSUK	Rowing	Men's LM4-	16 Dec
Bronze	NITIWAT KANJANASRI	Billiard and Snooker	Men's 9 Ball Pool Single	16 Dec
Bronze	MINGKAMON KOOMPHON	Athletics	Women's hammer throw	16 Dec
Bronze	SOMPONG SAOMBANKUAY	Athletics	Men's pole vault	16 Dec
Bronze	SUNISA KHOTSEEMUEANG	Athletics	Women's Heptathlon	16 Dec
Bronze	THAM WONG WITTHAYA	Archery	Men's recurve Individual	16 Dec
Bronze	SRISA ARD JENJARA	Swimming	Women's 50m freestyle	16 Dec
Bronze	CHOGRATHIN KASIPAT; MATJIUR RADOMYOS; PANANURATANA SUPAKRID; PHODUANG CHOLAWAT	Swimming	Men's 4 × 100 m medley relay	16 Dec
