= Myanmar at the 2013 SEA Games =

Myanmar at the 2013 Southeast Asian Games
- IOC code: MYA
- NOC: Myanmar Olympic Committee

in Naypyidaw
- Competitors: 990 in 33 sports
- Flag bearer: Aung Cho Myint
- Medals Ranked 2nd: Gold 84 Silver 63 Bronze 84 Total 231

Southeast Asian Games appearances (overview)
- 1959; 1961; 1965; 1967; 1969; 1971; 1973; 1975; 1977; 1979; 1981; 1983; 1985; 1987; 1989; 1991; 1993; 1995; 1997; 1999; 2001; 2003; 2005; 2007; 2009; 2011; 2013; 2015; 2017; 2019; 2021; 2023; 2025; 2027; 2029

Myanmar competed at the 2013 Southeast Asian Games. The 27th Southeast Asian Games took place in Naypyidaw, the capital of Myanmar, as well as in two other main cities, Yangon and Mandalay.

== Medals ==
=== Medal table ===
Sport	Gold	Silver	Bronze	Total
Traditional boat race	14	1	2	17
Vovinam	6	2	6	14
Kenpō	6	0	7	13
Chinlone	6	0	0	6
Wushu	5	5	5	15
Canoeing	5	5	2	12
Judo	4	4	3	11
Sepak takraw	4	4	2	10
Muay	4	3	3	10
Taekwondo	4	1	6	11
Chess	4	1	2	7
Pencak silat	3	4	3	10
Wrestling	3	3	6	12
Pétanque	3	0	1	4
Athletics	2	4	7	13
Karate	2	2	6	10
Boxing	2	2	2	6
Bodybuilding	2	2	0	4
Sailing	2	1	2	5
Billiards and Snooker	1	5	5	11
Rowing	1	2	2	5
Weightlifting	1	2	2	5
Shooting	1	2	1	4
Archery	1	0	3	4
Equestrian	0	3	0	3
Golf	0	3	0	3
Diving	0	1	1	2
Field hockey	0	0	2	2
Cycling	0	0	1	1
Football	0	0	1	1
Swimming	0	0	1	1
Total	84	62	85	233
Source: First Source, Second Source

=== Medals by date ===
Daily: Overall Medals
Day	Date	Gold medal	Silver medal	Bronze medal	Total
Day 1	4th	2	0	0	2
Day 2	5th	0	0	0	0
Day 3	6th	0	0	0	0
Day 4	7th	4	1	0	5
Day 5	8th	2	1	3	6
Day 6	9th	5	1	3	9
Day 7	10th	5	4	3	12
Day 8*	11th	0	1	1	2
Day 9	12th	3	5	2	10
Day 10	13th	5	12	9	26
Day 11	14th	5	4	7	16
Day 12	15th	7	2	7	16
Day 13	16th	1	7	6	14
Day 14	17th	3	1	5	9
Day 15	18th	11	6	3	20
Day 16	19th	7	7	8	22
Day 17	20th	10	3	13	26
Day 18	21st	14	6	15	35
Day 19**	22nd	2	1	0	3

== Controversies ==
=== Alleged racial discrimination ===
- About a day before the games began, the Burmese authorities deselected two Chin athletes who were gold medallists in national events. Another Chin athlete was also deselected a month previously.
