= Harif =

Harif may refer to:

== Places ==
- Harif, Iran, village in Iran
- Kfar HaRif, moshav in southern Israel
- Mount Harif, mountain in Israel

== People ==
- Aaron Ezekiel Harif (died 1670), Jewish Hungarian scholar
- Harif Guzman (born 1975), American artist
- Moshe Harif (1933–1982), Israeli activist

== Other ==
- Sahawiq, hot sauce; also known as harif

== See also ==
- Arif (disambiguation)
