= Rowing at the 2013 SEA Games =

Rowing at the 2013 SEA Games took place at Ngalike Dam in Naypyidaw, Myanmar between December 14–17.

== Medal table ==
* Host nation (Myanmar)

Rank	Nation	Gold	Silver	Bronze	Total
1	Indonesia	5	1	3	9
2	Vietnam	1	3	2	6
3	Myanmar*	1	2	2	5
4	Philippines	1	2	0	3
5	Singapore	1	0	0	1
6	Thailand	0	1	2	3
Totals (6 entries)		9	9	9	27

== Medal summary ==
=== Men ===
Event	Gold	Silver	Bronze
Single sculls	Nestor Cordova; Philippines	Aung Ko Min; Myanmar	Memo; Indonesia
Double sculls	Indonesia; Muhad Yakin; Ihram	Philippines; Benjamin Tolentino; Edgar Ilas	Thailand; Porntawat Inlee; Sajja Heamhern
Coxed eight	Indonesia; Jamaluddin; Iswandi; Agus Budi Aji; Anang Mulyana; Edwin Ginanjar Rudiana; Mochamad Ali Darta Lakiki; Muhad Yakin; Ihram; Jarudin	Thailand; Channarong Pholkaew; Panupan Paisanwan; Yothin Kritkangnok; Poonlap Maigerd; Chaichana Thakum; Somporn Mueangkhot; Sangpomcharee Nuttapong; Jaruwat Saensuk; Srichai Weerawat	Vietnam; Nguyễn Văn Sơn; Nguyễn Văn Chương; Đặng Minh Huy; Đặng Văn Tuấn; Trần Đăng Dũng; Nguyễn Văn Thuỳ; Phạm Minh Chính; Nguyễn Văn Linh; Nguyễn Văn Bình
Lightweight double sculls	Indonesia; Arief; Thomas Hallatu	Philippines; Roque Abala; Alvin Amposta	Vietnam; Đường Thanh Bình; Nguyễn Đình Huy
Lightweight coxless four	Indonesia; Jamaluddin; Mochamad Ali Darta Lakiki; Arief; Thomas Hallatu	Vietnam; Đường Thanh Bình; Nguyễn Đình Huy; Phạm Minh Chính; Nguyễn Văn Linh	Thailand; Channarong Pholkaew; Somporn Mueangkhot; Yothin Kritkangnok; Jaruwat Saensuk

=== Women ===
Event	Gold	Silver	Bronze
Single sculls	Saiyidah Aisyah; Singapore	Maryam Makdalena Daimoi; Indonesia	Shwe Zin Latt; Myanmar
Double sculls	Indonesia; Wahyuni; Maryam Makdalena Daimoi	Vietnam; Phạm Thị Hài; Phạm Thị Thảo	Myanmar; Than Than Nwe; Shwe Zin Latt
Lightweight double sculls	Vietnam; Lê Thị An; Trần Thị Sâm	Myanmar; Chaw Su; Ni Lar Win	Indonesia; Susanti; Wa Ode Fitri Rahmanjani
Lightweight coxless four	Myanmar; Chaw Su; Aye Thu Zar; Than Than Nwe; Ni Lar Win	Vietnam; Bùi Thị Nhất; Nguyễn Thị Trinh; Trần Thị Sâm; Phạm Thị Thảo	Indonesia; Ratna; Yayah Rokayah; Syifa Lisdiana; Yuniarty

== Results ==
=== Men's ===
==== Single sculls ====
All times are Myanmar Standard Time (UTC+06:30)

Date	Time	Event
Saturday, 14 December 2013	10:00	Preliminary
Monday, 16 December 2013	10:00	Final

===== Preliminary =====
- Qualification: 1–6 → Final (FA)

Rank	Athlete	Time	Notes
1	Memo (INA)	7:22.79	FA
2	Aung Ko Min (MYA)	7:31.05	FA
3	Nestor Cordova (PHI)	7:31.27	FA
4	Mohd Zulfadli Rozali (MAS)	7:50.35	FA
5	Theppibal Ruthtanaphol (THA)	7:53.22	FA
6	Dang Van Tuan (VIE)	7:56.89	FA

===== Final =====
Rank	Athlete	Time	Notes
1st place, gold medalist(s)	Nestor Cordova (PHI)	7:49.38	
2nd place, silver medalist(s)	Aung Ko Min (MYA)	7:49.68	
3rd place, bronze medalist(s)	Memo (INA)	8:03.61	
4	Theppibal Ruthtanaphol (THA)	8:14.81	
5	Dang Van Tuan (VIE)	8:26.97	
6	Mohd Zulfadli Rozali (MAS)	8:40.28	

==== Double sculls ====
All times are Myanmar Standard Time (UTC+06:30)

Date	Time	Event
Saturday, 14 December 2013	10:30	Preliminary
Monday, 16 December 2013	11:00	Final

===== Preliminary =====
- Qualification: 1–5 → Final (FA)

Rank	Team	Time	Notes
1	Philippines (PHI); Benjamin Jr Tolentino; Edgar Ilas	7:12.30	FA
2	Indonesia (INA); Muhad Yakin; Ihram	7:16.75	FA
3	Thailand (THA); Porntawat Inlee; Rachan Niwaswong	7:26.57	FA
4	Myanmar (MYA); Ye Lwin; Soe Nyi Nyi	7:30.89	FA
5	Malaysia (MAS); Muhammad Faris Abdullah; Muhammad Faiz Abdullah	7:45.95	FA

===== Final =====
Rank	Athlete	Time	Notes
1st place, gold medalist(s)	Indonesia (INA); Muhad Yakin; Ihram	7:07.42	
2nd place, silver medalist(s)	Philippines (PHI); Benjamin Jr Tolentino; Edgar Ilas	7:08.86	
3rd place, bronze medalist(s)	Thailand (THA); Porntawat Inlee; Rachan Niwaswong	7:31.33	
4	Myanmar (MYA); Ye Lwin; Soe Nyi Nyi	7:43.82	
5	Malaysia (MAS); Muhammad Faris Abdullah; Muhammad Faiz Abdullah	8:03.99	

==== Coxed eight ====
All times are Myanmar Standard Time (UTC+06:30)

Date	Time	Event
Sunday, 15 December 2013	10:45	Preliminary
Tuesday, 17 December 2013	11:30	Final

===== Preliminary =====
- Qualification: 1–5 → Final (FA)

Rank	Team	Time	Notes
1	Thailand (THA); Channarong Pholkaew; Panupan Paisanwan; Yothin Kritkangnok; Poonlap Maigerd; Chaichana Thakum; Somporn Mueangkhot; Nuttapong Sangpomcharee; Jaruwat Saensuk; Weerawat Srichai	6:06.50	FA
2	Myanmar (MYA); Soe Nyi Nyi; Ye Lwin; Wai Yan Tun; Nay Lin Oo; Aung Myat Thu; Nay Myo Say; Aye Ko; Thet Naing Soe; Tin Maung Oo	6:07.61	FA
3	Vietnam (VIE); Nguyen Van Son; Nguyen Van Chuong; Dang Minh Huy; Dang Van Tuan; Tran Dang Dung; Nguyen Van Thuy; Pham Minh Chinh; Nguyen Van Linh; Nguyen Van Binh	6:12.70	FA
4	Malaysia (MAS); Muhammad Faris Abdullah; Muhammad Faiz Abdullah; Muhammad Nur Afiq Johari; Ahmad Huzaifah Ahmad Izuddin; Mohd Rizal Helmy Anuar; Muhammad Rasul Zahiri; Mazlie Daham; Muhammad Aiman Aziz; Mohd Harith Yahya	6:14.78	FA
5	Indonesia (INA); Jamaluddin Jamaluddin; Iswandi; Agus Budi Aji; Anang Mulyana; Edwin Ginanjarrudiana; Mochamad Alidartalakiki; Muhad Yakin; Ihram Ihram; Jarudin	6:17.29	FA

===== Final =====
Rank	Athlete	Time	Notes
1st place, gold medalist(s)	Indonesia (INA); Jamaluddin Jamaluddin; Iswandi; Agus Budi Aji; Anang Mulyana; Edwin Ginanjarrudiana; Mochamad Alidartalakiki; Muhad Yakin; Ihram Ihram; Jarudin	5:59.88	
2nd place, silver medalist(s)	Thailand (THA); Channarong Pholkaew; Panupan Paisanwan; Yothin Kritkangnok; Poonlap Maigerd; Chaichana Thakum; Somporn Mueangkhot; Nuttapong Sangpomcharee; Jaruwat Saensuk; Weerawat Srichai	6:00.60	
3rd place, bronze medalist(s)	Vietnam (VIE); Nguyen Van Son; Nguyen Van Chuong; Dang Minh Huy; Dang Van Tuan; Tran Dang Dung; Nguyen Van Thuy; Pham Minh Chinh; Nguyen Van Linh; Nguyen Van Binh	6:12.26	
4	Myanmar (MYA); Soe Nyi Nyi; Ye Lwin; Wai Yan Tun; Nay Lin Oo; Aung Myat Thu; Nay Myo Say; Aye Ko; Thet Naing Soe; Tin Maung Oo	6:17.33	
5	Malaysia (MAS); Muhammad Faris Abdullah; Muhammad Faiz Abdullah; Muhammad Nur Afiq Johari; Ahmad Huzaifah Ahmad Izuddin; Mohd Rizal Helmy Anuar; Muhammad Rasul Zahiri; Mazlie Daham; Muhammad Aiman Aziz; Mohd Harith Yahya	6:25.03	

==== Lightweight double sculls ====
All times are Myanmar Standard Time (UTC+06:30)

Date	Time	Event
Sunday, 15 December 2013	10:15	Preliminary
Tuesday, 17 December 2013	10:30	Final

===== Preliminary =====
- Qualification: 1–6 → Final (FA)

Rank	Team	Time	Notes
1	Myanmar (MYA); Saw Wai Hlam; Myint San	7:08.34	FA
2	Indonesia (INA); Arief; Thomas Hallatu	7:11.12	FA
3	Vietnam (VIE); Duong Thanh Binh; Nguyen Dinh Huy	7:11.12	FA
4	Philippines (PHI); Roque Jr Abala; Alvin Amposta	7:18.42	FA
5	Malaysia (MAS); Syed Muhammad Iskandar Syed Abdul Fattah; Abdul Hadi Omar	7:27.34	FA
6	Thailand (THA); Jetsada Arwut; Jetsada Boonmanee	7:27.99	FA

===== Final =====
Rank	Athlete	Time	Notes
1st place, gold medalist(s)	Indonesia (INA); Arief; Thomas Hallatu	7:07.92	
2nd place, silver medalist(s)	Philippines (PHI); Roque Jr Abala; Alvin Amposta	7:09.53	
3rd place, bronze medalist(s)	Vietnam (VIE); Duong Thanh Binh; Nguyen Dinh Huy	7:10.09	
4	Myanmar (MYA); Saw Wai Hlam; Myint San	7:15.49	
5	Thailand (THA); Jetsada Arwut; Jetsada Boonmanee	7:37.10	
6	Malaysia (MAS); Syed Muhammad Iskandar Syed Abdul Fattah; Abdul Hadi Omar	8:16.78	

==== Lightweight coxless four ====
All times are Myanmar Standard Time (UTC+06:30)

Date	Time	Event
Saturday, 14 December 2013	11:00	Preliminary
Monday, 16 December 2013	12:00	Final

===== Preliminary =====
- Qualification: 1–6 → Final (FA)

Rank	Team	Time	Notes
1	Thailand (THA); Yothin Kritkangnok; Jaruwat Saensuk; Channarong Pholkaew; Somporn Mueangkhot	6:36.69	FA
2	Myanmar (MYA); Thet Naing Soe; Aye Ko; Saw Wai Hlam; Myint San	6:39.54	FA
3	Vietnam (VIE); Nguyen Dinh Huy} Duong Thanh Binh; Pham Minh Chinh; Nguyen Van Linh	6:41.59	FA
4	Philippines (PHI); Edgar Ilas; Alvin Amposta; Roque Jr Abala; Benjamin Jr Tolentino	6:43.67	FA
5	Indonesia (INA); Jamaluddin Jamaluddin; Mochamad Alidartalakiki; Arief; Thomas Hallatu	6:45.07	FA
6	Malaysia (MAS); Muhammad Nur Afiq Johari; Ahmad Huzaifah Ahmad Izuddin; Mazlie Daham; Muhammad Aiman Aziz	6:47.37	FA

===== Final =====
Rank	Athlete	Time	Notes
1st place, gold medalist(s)	Indonesia (INA); Jamaluddin Jamaluddin; Mochamad Alidartalakiki; Arief; Thomas Hallatu	6:49.98	
2nd place, silver medalist(s)	Vietnam (VIE); Nguyen Dinh Huy} Duong Thanh Binh; Pham Minh Chinh; Nguyen Van Linh	6:51.51	
3rd place, bronze medalist(s)	Thailand (THA); Yothin Kritkangnok; Jaruwat Saensuk; Channarong Pholkaew; Somporn Mueangkhot	6:52.19	
4	Philippines (PHI); Edgar Ilas; Alvin Amposta; Roque Jr Abala; Benjamin Jr Tolentino	7:01.60	
5	Myanmar (MYA); Thet Naing Soe; Aye Ko; Saw Wai Hlam; Myint San	7:12.83	
6	Malaysia (MAS); Muhammad Nur Afiq Johari; Ahmad Huzaifah Ahmad Izuddin; Mazlie Daham; Muhammad Aiman Aziz	7:31.13	

=== Women's ===
==== Single sculls ====
All times are Myanmar Standard Time (UTC+06:30)

Date	Time	Event
Sunday, 15 December 2013	10:00	Preliminary
Tuesday, 17 December 2013	10:00	Final

===== Preliminary =====
- Qualification: 1–5 → Final (FA)

Rank	Athlete	Time	Notes
1	Saiyidah Aisyah Mohamed Rafa'ee (SIN)	8:06.27	FA
2	Phuttharaksa Neegree (THA)	8:14.52	FA
3	Ta Thanh Huyen (VIE)	8:19.45	FA
4	Maryam Makdalena Daimoi (INA)	8:21.91	FA
5	Shwe Zin Latt (MYA)	8:33.19	FA

===== Final =====
Rank	Athlete	Time	Notes
1st place, gold medalist(s)	Saiyidah Aisyah Mohamed Rafa'ee (SIN)	8:08.94	
2nd place, silver medalist(s)	Maryam Makdalena Daimoi (INA)	8:10.47	
3rd place, bronze medalist(s)	Shwe Zin Latt (MYA)	8:14.85	
4	Phuttharaksa Neegree (THA)	8:17.39	
5	Ta Thanh Huyen (VIE)	8:45.08	

==== Double sculls ====
All times are Myanmar Standard Time (UTC+06:30)

Date	Time	Event
Saturday, 14 December 2013	10:15	Preliminary
Monday, 16 December 2013	10:30	Final

===== Preliminary =====
- Qualification: 1–5 → Final (FA)

Rank	Team	Time	Notes
1	Myanmar (MYA); Than Than Nwe; Shwe Zin Latt	7:38.53	FA
2	Vietnam (VIE); Pham Thi Thao; Pham Thi Hai	7:48.20	FA
3	Indonesia (INA); Wahyuni Wahyuni; Maryam Makdalena Daimoi	7:52.40	FA
4	Thailand (THA); Suphisara Phangkra Thokthada; Anita Mindra Whiskin	8:01.02	FA
5	Malaysia (MAS); Eleonie Rikan Marten; Norshazlin Che Adnan	8:47.05	FA

===== Final =====
Rank	Athlete	Time	Notes
1st place, gold medalist(s)	Indonesia (INA); Wahyuni Wahyuni; Maryam Makdalena Daimoi	7:46.42	
2nd place, silver medalist(s)	Vietnam (VIE); Pham Thi Thao; Pham Thi Hai	7:47.92	
3rd place, bronze medalist(s)	Myanmar (MYA); Than Than Nwe; Shwe Zin Latt	7:50.88	
4	Thailand (THA); Suphisara Phangkra Thokthada; Anita Mindra Whiskin	8:01.77	
5	Malaysia (MAS); Eleonie Rikan Marten; Norshazlin Che Adnan	9:01.34	

==== Lightweight double sculls ====
All times are Myanmar Standard Time (UTC+06:30)

Date	Time	Event
Saturday, 14 December 2013	10:45	Preliminary
Monday, 16 December 2013	11:30	Final

===== Preliminary =====
- Qualification: 1–5 → Final (FA)

Rank	Team	Time	Notes
1	Vietnam (VIE); Le Thi An; Tran Thi Sam	7:57.01	FA
2	Myanmar (MYA); Chaw Su; Ni Lar Win	8:06.31	FA
3	Indonesia (INA); Susanti Susanti; Wa Ode Fitri Rahmanjani	8:15.50	FA
4	Thailand (THA); Wilailuk Kanthiya; Nichakul Nukooltham	8:50.17	FA
5	Malaysia (MAS); Fatin Nur Ain Ramli; Yeni Ermita Daswir	9:06.03	FA

===== Final =====
Rank	Athlete	Time	Notes
1st place, gold medalist(s)	Vietnam (VIE); Le Thi An; Tran Thi Sam	8:02.96	
2nd place, silver medalist(s)	Myanmar (MYA); Chaw Su; Ni Lar Win	8:12.41	
3rd place, bronze medalist(s)	Indonesia (INA); Susanti Susanti; Wa Ode Fitri Rahmanjani	8:34.73	
4	Thailand (THA); Wilailuk Kanthiya; Nichakul Nukooltham	9:01.22	
5	Malaysia (MAS); Fatin Nur Ain Ramli; Yeni Ermita Daswir	9:32.72	

==== Lightweight coxless four ====
All times are Myanmar Standard Time (UTC+06:30)

Date	Time	Event
Sunday, 15 December 2013	10:30	Preliminary
Tuesday, 17 December 2013	11:00	Final

===== Preliminary =====
- Qualification: 1–5 → Final (FA)

Rank	Team	Time	Notes
1	Vietnam (VIE); Bui Thi Nhat; Nguyen Thi Trinh; Tran Thi Sam; Pham Thi Thao	7:07.95	FA
2	Indonesia (INA); Ratna; Yayah Rokayah; Syifa Lisdiana; Yuniarty	7:16.25	FA
3	Myanmar (MYA); Chaw Su} Aye Thu Zar; Than Than Nwe; Ni Lar Win	7:23.60	FA
4	Thailand (THA); Krittiya Harirak; Matinee Raruen; Suphisara Phangkra Thokthada; Laksoongnoen Sawittree	7:36.67	FA
5	Malaysia (MAS); Kashifah Mohiddin; Siti Aishah Abd Rahman; Fatin Nur Ain Ramli; Yeni Ermita Daswir	7:54.75	FA

===== Final =====
Rank	Athlete	Time	Notes
1st place, gold medalist(s)	Myanmar (MYA); Chaw Su} Aye Thu Zar; Than Than Nwe; Ni Lar Win	7:07.45	
2nd place, silver medalist(s)	Vietnam (VIE); Bui Thi Nhat; Nguyen Thi Trinh; Tran Thi Sam; Pham Thi Thao	7:09.53	
3rd place, bronze medalist(s)	Indonesia (INA); Ratna; Yayah Rokayah; Syifa Lisdiana; Yuniarty	7:16.55	
4	Thailand (THA); Krittiya Harirak; Matinee Raruen; Suphisara Phangkra Thokthada; Laksoongnoen Sawittree	7:19.44	
5	Malaysia (MAS); Kashifah Mohiddin; Siti Aishah Abd Rahman; Fatin Nur Ain Ramli; Yeni Ermita Daswir	7:57.08	
