= Basalamah =

Basalamah is a surname of Arabic origin (Arabic: بسلامة). People with the surname include:

- Arief Muhammad Basalamah, Indonesian diplomat
- Khalid Basalamah (born 1975), Indonesian Salafist preacher and entrepreneur
- Nadhif Basalamah (born 2000), Indonesian singer-songwriter
- Syafiq Riza Basalamah (born 1977), Indonesian Salafist preacher
