= Raehanul Bahraen =

Indonesian Islamic preacher and medical specialist

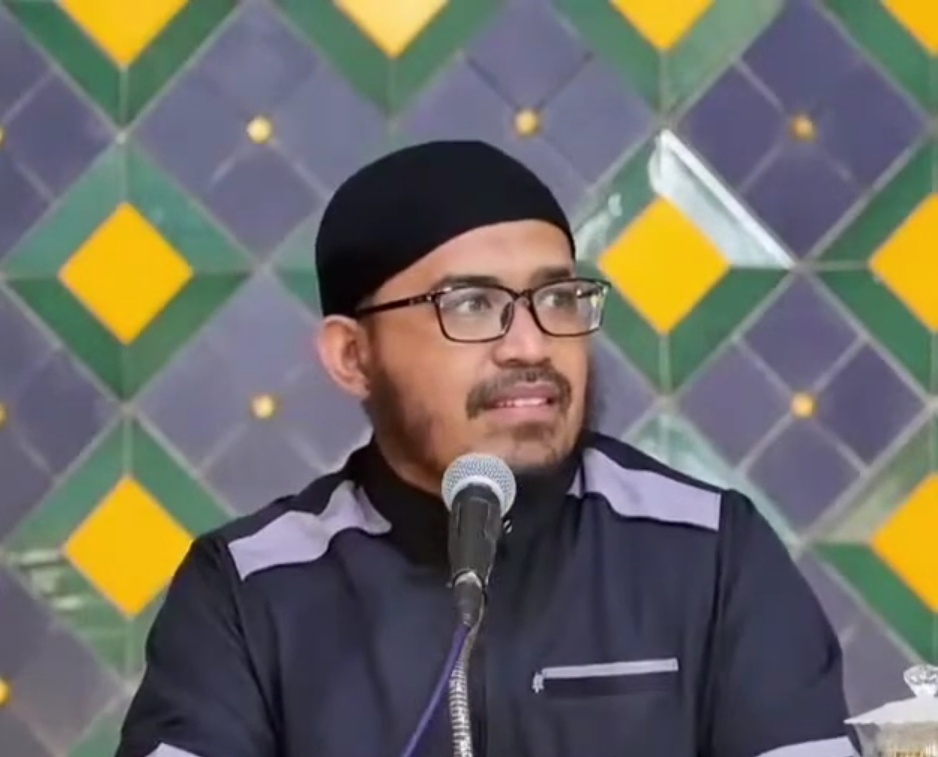
- Raehanul Bahraen Leads Islamic Study at Gajah Mada University's Campus Mosque in 2022
- Born: March 4, 1986 (age 40); Dompu
- Education: Gadjah Mada University (dr.) Gadjah Mada University (M.Sc.) Gadjah Mada University (Sp.PK.)
- Website: https://muslimafiyah.com

Raehanul Bahraen (March 4, 1986) is a medical specialist, Islamic preacher, writer, and educator from Dompu, Sumbawa, West Nusa Tenggara, Indonesia. He is also the chairman of the Al-Atsari Islamic Education Foundation in Yogyakarta (YPIA), the advisor of the Indonesian Muslim Scientists and Professionals Community (KIPMI), the advisor of the Indonesia Bertauhid Foundation, and the advisor of the Indonesian Muslimafiyah Education Foundation.

He is known for his activities in spreading health knowledge in collaboration with Islamic teachings. He provides online and offline da'wah studies, writes religious and health materials on the website he manages, namely the website of the Indonesian Muslimafiyah da'wah organization, which provides education in the form of scientific studies in the fields of religion, health, psychology, sports and self-development, which he connects from an Islamic perspective.

== Education ==
Raehanul received his formal education from elementary to secondary level in Sumbawa Besar and Mataram before continuing to the Faculty of Medicine, Gadjah Mada University from 2004 to 2010.

While studying medicine at Gadjah Mada University, he also studied Islamic law at the Ma'had Al-'Ilmi YPIA, in the same year as Abduh Tuasikal. He studied at the school for approximately 2 years, from 2005 to 2007. It was there that he learned Arabic.

He then took specialist education in Clinical Pathology and a master's degree in Clinical Medicine at Gadjah Mada University from 2013 to 2018.

== Career ==
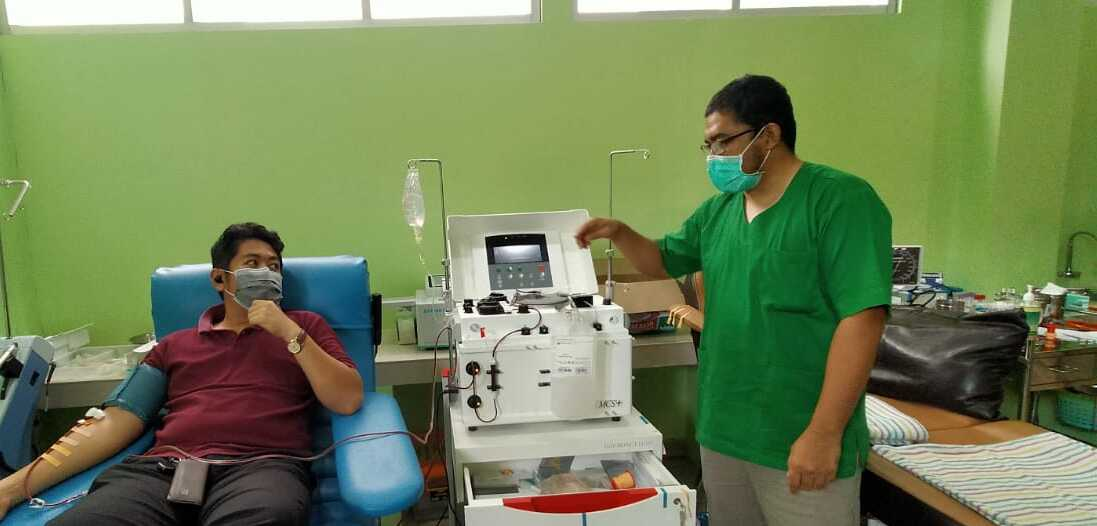
Patient and doctor Raehanul Bahraen at the West Nusa Tenggara Regional General Hospital in 2021

Raehanul is a clinical pathology specialist who has worked at several hospitals such as General Hospital of West Nusa Tenggara, Mataram Islamic Hospital, and Hospital of Mataram University. In addition, he also serves as a lecturer at the Faculty of Medicine, Mataram University as a Civil Servant.

== Fatwa ==
=== Spend New Year's Eve as usual ===
Raehanul stated that New Year's Eve should be celebrated like any other night, without any special treatment. He emphasized that there is no need to hold special zikir gatherings, religious study groups, or prayer events specifically associated with New Year's Eve.

He explained that the Gregorian calendar has its roots in Roman tradition, where January 1 was dedicated to Janus, the god of doors and beginnings. In fact, January itself is named after him. According to him, creating special religious activities could potentially make New Year's Eve a special moment, even though historically and according to Islamic teachings, the Gregorian New Year is not part of Muslim celebrations.

His view is also reinforced by a number of scholars who consider that giving congratulations or associating certain acts of worship with the moment of the Christian New Year can fall into the category of tasyabbuh or resembling non-Muslim traditions.

== See also ==
- Yazid bin Abdul Qodir Jawas
- Syafiq Riza Basalamah
- Khalid Basalamah
