= Dharmaputra =

Dharmaputra can refer to:

- Yudhishthira, also known as Dharmaputra, character in the Mahabharata
- Dharmputra, 1961 Indian film
- Ghafur Akbar Dharmaputra (1964–2022), Indonesian diplomat
