= Yazid bin Abdul Qadir Jawas =

Indonesian Islamic preacher (1963–2024)

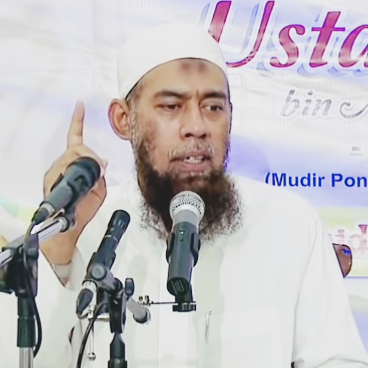
- Yazid in 2020

Personal life
- Born: Yazid; 1963 Karanganyar, Kebumen, Central Java, Indonesia
- Died: 11 July 2024 (aged 61) Bogor, West Java, Indonesia
- Education: Imam Mohammad Ibn Saud Islamic University; Islamic and Arabic College of Indonesia
- Known for: Supervisor of Radio Rodja and Minhajus Sunnah Bogor Islamic Boarding School
- Other names: Yazid Jawas, Yazid Abdul Qadir
- Occupation: Ustad; writer

Religious life
- Religion: Islam
- Denomination: Sunni
- Movement: Salafism

Muslim leader
- Influenced by: Muhammad ibn al-Uthaymin

Yazid bin Abdul Qadir Jawas (1963 – 11 July 2024) was an Indonesian Salafi scholar and writer. He is also known for writing many religious Islamic books in Indonesian. His lectures which are considered controversial make Yazid often receive criticism from a number of Indonesian Muslims.

== Early life ==
Yazid studied at LIPIA, then he continued his education at Imam Mohammad Ibn Saud Islamic University. He studied under Muhammad ibn al-Uthaymin and Abd al-Razzaq al-Badr.

== Activity ==
Yazid started his career as a lecturer around the 1990s with other LIPIA alumni. He is also one of the caretakers of the al-Irsyad Islamic Boarding School in Salatiga, Central Java. He was also involved in the founding of Radio Rodja, a Salafi radio station in Indonesia. He was also a regular contributor of the Radio platform. He has written Islamic religious books in Indonesian.

Yazid founded the Minhajus Sunnah Islamic boarding school in Bogor Regency.

According to his own admission, Yazid came into dispute with Jafar Umar Thalib, another Indonesian cleric, when Maluku sectarian conflict broke out in 1999. The dispute came out because Yazid has chosen the more moderate approach and appeal to the authority under Abdurrahman Wahid, the president of Government of Indonesia to manage the conflict; whereas Jafar has chosen the radical approach by founding Laskar Jihad paramilitary armed group to intervene the Maluku conflict without permission from the government. Yazid said he took this stance after he consulted with his teacher in Saudi, Muhammad ibn al-Uthaymin, who opposed the stance of Jafar who ignored the government authority.

Since the 2000s, Yazid has become a phenomenal Salafi preacher as a result of his harsh views on heresy and his criticism of Sufism in Indonesia.

== Death ==
Yazid died on July 11, 2024 after falling ill during a pilgrimage to Mecca. He was 61, and was buried in Bogor. Yazid's death caused grief for the Salafi community in Indonesia; Khalid Basalamah, one of Indonesia's leading Salafi preachers then expressed his condolences to Yazid in one of his lectures. Other preachers including Abdul Somad, Muflih Safitra, Firanda Andirja, Adi Hidayat, and Das'ad Latif also expressed their condolences and prayers for him.

== Criticism ==
Yazid was accused of being a follower of Wahhabism, a teaching of Islamism from Saudi Arabia that is considered "puritanical and harsh" by traditional Indonesian Muslims, as a result of Yazid's rejection of the attitude of taqlid which he considered "damaging". Even so, a group of Muslims also praised Yazid and called him someone who was "intelligent" and "highly knowledgeable".

One of his books, Mulia dengan Manhaj Salaf, had sparked controversy in Indonesia. Founder of Islamic Defenders Front and Indonesian Islamic preacher, Rizieq Shihab criticized the book. Rizieq Shihab also stated that Indonesia, Malaysia, and Brunei, as countries whose populations are predominantly Ash'ari, must also have laws prohibiting the spread of Wahhabism.

== Works ==
Yazid wrote many books which mainly focusing on Islamic teachings, among his works were:

- Jawas, Yazid bin Abdul Qadir (2005). Prinsip dasar Islam: menurut al-Qur-an dan as-sunnah yang shahih [The basic principles of Islam: according to the authentic Al-Qur'an and As-Sunna] (in Indonesian). Pustaka al-Taqwa. ISBN 979-96628-4-2. OCLC 957349905.
- Yazid, Abdul Qadir (2008). Mulia dengan Manhaj Salaf [Exalted with Manhaj Salaf] (in Indonesian). Pustaka at-Taqwa. ISBN 978-979-16611-3-3. OCLC 949718641.
- Jawas, Yazid bin Abdul Qadir (2005). Dzikir pagi dan petang dan sesudah shalat fardhu menurut Al-Qur'an dan As-Sunnah yang shahih [Morning and evening dhikr and after obligatory prayers according to the authentic Qur'an and As-Sunna] (PDF) (in Indonesian). Bogor: Pustaka Imam asy-Syafi'i. ISBN 979-3536-32-2.
- Jawas, Yazid Abdul Qadir (2012). Syarah Aqidah Ahl al-Sunna wa al-Jama'a (in Indonesian). Pustaka Imam As-Syafi'i. ISBN 978-979-3536-64-4. OCLC 949744119.
- Jawas, Yazid bin Abdul Qadir (2015). Jihad: Dalam Syariat Islam dan Penerapannya di Masa Kini [Jihad: In Islamic Sharia and Its Application in the Present] (in Indonesian). Pustaka Asy-Syafi'i. ISBN 978-602-9183-93-1.
- Yazid, Abdul Qadir (2018). Syarah kitab tauhid : memahami dan merealisasikan tauhid dalam kehidupan [explanation of the book of monotheism: understanding and realizing monotheism in life] (in Indonesian). Pustaka at-Taqwa. ISBN 9786029183993.
- Yazid, Abdul Qadir (2018). penjelasan arba'in an-nawawi : Memuat 42 hadits nabi Muhammad SAW tentang fondasi ajaran Islam dan faedah-faedahnya [Arba'in an-nawawi's explanation: Contains 42 hadiths of the Prophet Muhammad PBUH about the foundation of Islamic teachings and their benefits] (in Indonesian). Pustaka at-Taqwa. ISBN 978-602-8062-80-0.
- Yazid, Abdul Qadir (2018). Birrul walidain : berbakti kepada kedua orang tua [Birrul walidain: devoted to both parents] (in Indonesian). Pustaka at-Taqwa. ISBN 9786029183856.
- Yazid, Abdul Qadir (2005). Kedudukan As-Sunnah dalam Syariat Islam [The Position of As-Sunnah in Islamic Sharia] (in Indonesian). Pustaka at-Taqwa. ISBN 9789799662859.
- Yazid, Abdul Qadir (2008). Tauhid Jalan Menuju Keadilan dan Kemakmuran [Monotheism is the Path to Justice and Prosperity] (in Indonesian). Media Tarbiyah. ISBN 9789792658637.
- Yazid, Abdul Qadir (2015). Hukum, Lagu, Musik dan Nasyd [Law, Songs, Music and Nasheed] (in Indonesian). Pustaka At-Taqwa. ISBN 9789792658316.
- Yazid, Abdul Qadir (2016). Zadul Ma'ad [Zad al-Ma'ad] (in Indonesian). ISBN 9789792658316.
- Yazid, Abdul Qadir (2005). Taubat & Do'a Pelebur Dosa [Repentance and Prayer for Sin Removal] (in Indonesian). Media Tarbiyah.
- Yazid, Abdul Qadir (2008). Syarah rukun Islam [Explanation of the pillars of Islam] (in Indonesian). Media Tarbiyah. ISBN 9789792658484.
- Yazid, Abdul Qadir (2007). [Jihad] : kedudukan jihad dalam syariat Islam [[Jihad]: the position of jihad in Islamic law] (in Indonesian). Pustaka Al-Ilmu.
- Yazid, Abdul Qadir (2007). Sebaik-baik amal adalah Sholat [The best deed is prayer] (in Indonesian). penerbit at-Taqwa. ISBN 9789799662880.
- Yazid, Abdul Qadir (2009). Takwa : Jalan Menuju Sukses Abadi (Surga disediakan bagi Orang Bertakwa) [Taqwa: The Path to Eternal Success (Heaven is prepared for the Pious)] (in Indonesian). Pustaka At-Taqwa. ISBN 9789791661164. Archived from the original on 2025-08-16.
- Yazid, Abdul Qadir (2012). Ritual Sunnah Setahun.Panduan Amalan Pribadi Muslim 24 Jam [Sunnah Rituals for a Year. 24 Hour Muslim Personal Practice Guide] (in Indonesian). Media Tarbiyah.
- Yazid, Abdul Qadir (2012). Tauba kewajiba seumur hidup [Repentance is a lifelong obligation] (in Indonesian). Pustaka Khazanah Fawa'id.
- Yazid, Abdul Qadir (2017). Amar Ma'ruf Nahi Munkar; Menurut Ahlus Sunnah Wal Jama'ah [Enjoining good and forbidding wrong; According to Ahlus Sunnah Wal Jama'ah] (in Indonesian). Depok Fathan Prima Media. ISBN 978-979-16611-8-8. Archived from the original on 2024-07-11.
- Yazid, Abdul Qadir (2013). Ar Rasail Jilid 1 : Kumpulan Risalah, Aqidah, Fiqih, dan Hukum [Ar Rasail Volume 1: Collection of Treatises, Aqidah, Fiqh, and Law] (in Indonesian). Media Tarbiyah. ISBN 978-979-26-5872-9. Archived from the original on 2024-07-11.
- Yazid, Abdul Qadir (2013). Ar Rasail Jilid 2 : Kumpulan Risalah, Aqidah, Fiqih, dan Hukum [Ar Rasail Volume 2: Collection of Treatises, Aqidah, Fiqh, and Law] (in Indonesian). Media Tarbiyah. ISBN 978-979-26-5864-4. Archived from the original on 2024-07-11.
- Yazid, Abdul Qadir (2016). Ar Rasail Jilid 3 : Kumpulan Risalah, Aqidah, Fiqih, dan Hukum [Ar Rasail Volume 3: Collection of Treatises, Aqidah, Fiqh, and Law] (in Indonesian). Media Tarbiyah. ISBN 978-979-26-5865-1. Archived from the original on 2024-07-11.
- Yazid, Abdul Qadir (2016). Ar Rasail Jilid 4 : Kumpulan Risalah, Aqidah, Fiqih, dan Hukum [Ar Rasail Volume 4: Collection of Treatises, Aqidah, Fiqh, and Law] (in Indonesian). Media Tarbiyah. ISBN 978-979-26-5871-2. Archived from the original on 2024-07-11.
- Yazid, Abdul Qadir (2016). Konsekuensi Cinta Kepada Nabi Muhammad [Consequences of Love for the Prophet Muhammad] (in Indonesian). PustakaAttaqwa. ISBN 978-979-1661-24-9. Archived from the original on 2024-07-11.
- Yazid, Abdul Qadir (2017). Sifat wudhu dan shalat Nabi [The nature of ablution and prayer of the Prophet] (in Indonesian). Pustaka Imam Asy-Syafi. ISBN 978-602-9183-76-4.
- Yazid, Abdul Qadir (2009). Hikmah dibalik musibah dan ruqyah syar'iyyah : do'a-do'a dan pengobatan terhadap sihir, guna-guna dan penyakit-penyakit lainnya [The wisdom behind disasters and ruqyah syar'iyyah: prayers and treatment for magic, witchcraft and other diseases] (in Indonesian). Pustaka Imam Asy-Syafi. ISBN 978-602-8062-22-0.
- Yazid, Abdul Qadir (2018). Do'a & Wirid Mengobati Guna-Guna dan Sihir Menurut al-Quran dan as-Sunnah [Prayer and Wirid: Treating Witchcraft and Magic According to the Qur'an and as-Sunnah] (in Indonesian). Niaga Swadaya. ISBN 9789793536187.
- Yazid, Abdul Qadir (2001). Pokok-pokok Aqidah Ahlus Sunnah Wal Jamaah [The Principles of the Aqidah of Ahlus Sunnah Wal Jamaah] (paperback) (in Indonesian). Pustaka At-Taqwa.
- Yazid, Abdul Qadir (2014). Waktumu, Dihabiskan Untuk Apa? [What is your time spent on?] (paperback) (in Indonesian). Pustaka At-Taqwa. ISBN 9789791661317.
- Yazid, Abdul Qadir (2014). Wasiat Nabi ﷺ kepada Ibnu Abbas رضي الله عنها [The Prophet ﷺ's will to Ibn Abbas may Allah bless him] (paperback) (in Indonesian). Pustaka At-Taqwa. ISBN 9789792658279.
- Yazid, Abdul Qadir (2014). Istiqamah, Konsekuensi & Konsisten Menetapi Jalan Ketaatan [Istiqamah, Consequences & Consistently Following the Path of Obedience] (paperback) (in Indonesian). Pustaka At-Taqwa. ISBN 9789791661324.
- Yazid, Abdul Qadir (2008). Menuntut Ilmu Jalan Menuju Surga [Seeking Knowledge of the Way to Heaven] (paperback) (in Indonesian). Pustaka At-Taqwa. ISBN 9789799662873.
- Yazid, Abdul Qadir (2007). Panduan Shalat Jum'at [Friday Prayer Guide] (paperback) (in Indonesian). Pustaka At-Taqwa. ISBN 9789791661102.
- Yazid, Abdul Qadir (2010). Syarah Rukun Islam 2; Shalat [Explanation of Pillars of Islam 2; Prayer] (paperback) (in Indonesian). Media Tarbiyah.
- Yazid, Abdul Qadir (2016). JANGAN DEKATI ZINA [DO NOT APPROACH ADULTERY] (in Indonesian). Pustaka at-Taqwa. ISBN 978-979-16612-5-6. Archived from the original on 2024-07-11.
- Yazid, Abdul Qadir (2011). Tauhid : Jalan Kebahagiaan, Keselamatan & Keberkahan Dunia-Akhirat [Monotheism: The Path to Happiness, Safety & Blessings in the World and the Hereafter] (in Indonesian). Media Tarbiyah. ISBN 978-979-26-5835-4.
- Yazid, Abdul Qadir (2016). 7 Wasiat Nabi Kepada Abu Dzarr [7 Testaments of the Prophet to Abu Dharr] (in Indonesian). Pustaka at-Taqwa. ISBN 978-979-16611-2-6. Archived from the original on 2024-07-11.
- Yazid, Abdul Qadir (2016). Adab & akhlak Penuntut Ilmu [Manners & morals for students of knowledge] (in Indonesian). Pustaka at-Taqwa. ISBN 978-979-16612-2-5.
- Yazid, Abdul Qadir (2018). Pengertian Syahadat Menurut Aqidah Ahlus Sunnah Wal Jamaah [Understanding the Creed according to the aqidah of Ahlus Sunnah Wal Jamaah] (in Indonesian). Pustaka Khazanah Fawa'id. ISBN 978-602-61392-4-5.
- Yazid, Abdul Qadir (2018). Hadiah istimewa menuju keluarga sakinah [A special gift to a Sakina family] (in Indonesian). Pustaka Khazanah Fawa'id. ISBN 978-602-5806-00-1.
- Yazid, Abdul Qadir (2015). Jihad Dalam Syariat Islam dan Perkembangannya di Masa Kini [Jihad in Islamic Sharia and its Development in the Present] (in Indonesian). Pustaka Imam Syafi'i. ISBN 978-602-9183-93-1.
- Yazid, Abdul Qadir (2005). Doa dan hiburan : Bagi orang sakit dan terkena musibah [Prayer and consolation: For people who are sick and affected by disaster] (in Indonesian). Pustaka Imam Syafi'i. ISBN 979-3536-34-9.
- Yazid, Abdul Qadir (2005). Dunia Ini Adalah Tempat Cobaan dan Ujian [This World Is a Place of temptations and Trials] (in Indonesian). Pustaka Imam Syafi'i. ISBN 979-3536-34-9.
- Yazid, Abdul Qadir (2018). Dunia Lebih Jelek Daripada Bangkai Kambing [The World Is Uglier Than A Goat's Carcass] (in Indonesian). Pustaka at-Taqwa. ISBN 978-979-1661-34-8.
- Yazid, Abdul Qadir (2008). Sifat Wudhu' Nabi Shallallahu 'alaihi wa sallam: Definisi, Kedudukan, Keutamaan, Tata cara, Syarat, Adab, serta Pembatal Wudhu', dll [The nature of the ablution of the Prophet sallallaahu 'alaihi wa sallam: definition, position, priority, procedures, conditions, etiquette, and canceling ablution, etc.] (in Indonesian). Media Tarbiyah. ISBN 978-979-26-5858-3.
- Yazid, Abdul Qadir (2009). Hukum Meminta-Minta Dan Mengemis Dalam Syariat Islam [The Law of beseeching and begging according Islamic Sharia] (in Indonesian). p. attaqwa. ISBN 978-979-16612-0-1.
- Yazid, Abdul Qadir (2015). Haramnya Darah Seorang Muslim [the sacredness of the blood of a Muslim] (in Indonesian). Media Tarbiyah. Archived from the original on 2024-07-11.
- Yazid, Abdul Qadir (2018). Taubat : kewajiban seumur hidup [Repentance: a lifelong obligation] (in Indonesian). 978-602-61392-7-6. Archived from the original on 2024-07-11.
- Yazid, Abdul Qadir (2003). Pengawasan Dengan Pendekatan Agama (Modul 1 - Modul 5) [Supervision with a Religious Approach (Module 1 - Module 5)] (in Indonesian). Ministry of Religious Affairs (Indonesia). ISBN 978-602-61392-7-6.
- Yazid, Abdul Qadir (2010). Manhaj Ahlus Sunnah wal Jama'ah dalam tazkiyatun nufus [Manhaj Ahlus Sunnah wal Jama'ah in tazkiyatun nufus] (in Indonesian). Pustaka At-Taqwa. ISBN 9789791661232.
- Yazid, Abdul Qadir (2009). Sedekah sebagai bukti keimanan dan penghapus dosa [Alms as sign of faith and forgiveness of sins] (in Indonesian). Pustaka At-Taqwa. ISBN 978-979-16612-1-8. Archived from the original on 2024-07-11.
- Yazid, Abdul Qadir (2010). Taqwa : jalan menuju sukses abadi [Taqwa: the path to eternal success] (in Indonesian). Pustaka At-Taqwa. ISBN 9789791661164. Archived from the original on 2024-07-11.
