= Jonathan Koon =

American fashion designer

Jonathan Koon is a Chinese American entrepreneur, artist, and fashion designer who became a self-made millionaire at 16.

== Early career ==
Koon was born in 1983 in Jamaica, Queens in New York City, where he was raised. He is the only child of immigrant parents from Hong Kong. In 1998, while attending Stuyvesant High School, Koon launched Extreme Performance Motorsports, a company that imports car tuning accessories from Asia. By age 16, Koon had opened wholesale accounts with Asian auto distributors importing custom body kits, aftermarket wheels and rims, stereo systems, and other specialized accessories. In Bloomberg Businessweek Magazine, Koon describes the import movement and culture as "a virus that spread." Koon's business became one of the leading suppliers of Pimp My Ride.

Koon closed down his business while studying at Georgetown University. He graduated with a degree in international business and management. In 2004, he re-entered the business and patented car accessories like cell phone holders and air ionizers, that became a success among record label executives and rappers. His move from resale to overseas manufacturing also led to contacts with garment manufacturing. He established Koon Enterprises, which manufactures headwear for Rocawear, Honda, Costco, and Federated Private Label, among others.

== Fashion design ==
=== 8732 ===
In 2008, Koon purchased the streetwear brand 8732 from Jay-Z at ROC Apparel Group. With platinum recording artist Young Jeezy and premier streetwear designer Kwende Waller, he started Young Jeezy 8732 Apparel Ltd, which had over $40 million in annual sales, becoming one of the three top-selling streetwear brands in the U.S.

The clothing company now falls under Tykoon Brand Holdings, based in his native Queens, N.Y. Koon claims the 27-person, privately held company is worth $80 million.

=== Domenico Vacca ===
In 2010, Jon Koon partnered with designer Domenico Vacca to create "Domenico Vacca Denim." Writing for Women's Wear Daily, David Lipke said the partnership combined Vacca's client base with Koon's expertise in sportswear manufacturing.

=== Private Stock ===
In April 2013, Koon launched Private Stock, a clothing label and store at 76 Wooster Street, formerly the home and studio of Andy Warhol. The New York Times lauded the store's design, saying that Koon's showmanship "is worth exploring because it is so over the top." On June 7, 2013, Koon's flagship was named "New York's Most Extravagant Store" by Refinery29.

=== Haculla ===
In January 2015, Koon, as the owner of the Haculla streetwear brand, along with New York City Artist Harif Guzman, collaborated with British streetwear label Trapstar to launch an exclusive "Haculla X Trapstar Redline" collection for Harvey Nichols.

== Private life ==
Koon owns an extensive clothing collection comprising more than 2,000 pairs of jeans.

== The Big Egg Hunt ==
In 2014, Koon partnered with the Fabergé Big Egg Hunt in New York City, which played host to the world's biggest egg hunt. Over 200 egg sculptures, each individually created by the world's leading artists and designers, were displayed across the city for three weeks. The hunt was sponsored by Fabergé, which raised money for children in New York City through Agnes Gund's Studio in a School and conservation efforts through Mark Shand's Elephant Family, saving the endangered Asian elephant and its habitat.

For Koon's egg, "The Golden Child Egg" was created over several stages: Two exquisite Chinese antique vases from the mid-20th century were acquired from China and then shattered and carefully re-fractured. The 30"x 22" fiberglass white egg was first hand gilded with 24k gold leaf and afterward in-laid with the broken porcelain pieces from two Chinese antique vases from the mid-20th century, matching the edges of the irregular cracks and mosaicked, positioning each piece equidistant from each other so that the gold would glimmer through the crack lines. "The Golden Child" egg embodied a melding of both the past and future, culture and art form.

Koon's egg is a mathematical illusion that not only reflects his personality and aesthetic philosophy but also illuminates his culture and background through the use of existing original antique pieces transformed into a new form and perspective. "The Golden Child Egg" was chosen to be one of 20 selected creations auctioned at Sotheby's on April 22, 2014.

== See also ==
- Chinese Americans in New York City
