= Arief =

Arief is a masculine given name and surname of Arabic origin. Notable people with the name include:

== Given name ==
- Arief Muhammad Basalamah (born 1966), Indonesian diplomat
- Arief Budiman (1941–2020), Indonesian sociologist and professor
- Arief Catur (born 1999), Indonesian footballer
- Arief Hidayat (born 1956), Indonesian judge
- Arief Hidayat (diplomat) (born 1965), Indonesian diplomat
- Arief Rachadiono Wismansyah (born 1977), Indonesian politician
- Arief Yahya (born 1961), Indonesian politician

== Surname ==
- A. Hamid Arief (1924–1992), Indonesian actor
- Basrief Arief (1947–2021), Indonesian lawyer and politician
- Etty Hadiwati Arief (1957–2025), Indonesian author
- Muhammad Arief (1904/05–??), Indonesian musician
- Zaenal Arief (born 1981), Indonesian footballer

== See also ==
- Arif (disambiguation)
