= Al-Irshad Association =

Muslim organization in Indonesia

- جمعية الإرشاد
- Formation: 6 September 1914; 112 years ago. 2007; 19 years ago (current name)
- Founder: Ahmad Surkati; Umar Mangush
- Type: Association
- Purpose: Religious islamic; Education
- Headquarters: Kramat Raya Street 23, Senen, Central Jakarta
- Region served: Indonesia
- Chairman: Sofyan Baswedan
- Website: perhimpunanalirsyad.com

Al-Irshad Association (Perhimpunan Al-Irsyad) is a religious-based community organization in Indonesia which was originally an educational institution aimed at preaching for the development of the Muslim community in the purity of tawhid, worship, and deeds.

The establishment of Al-Irshad Association historically traces back to the organization Jumiyyah Al-Ishlah wal Irsyad, abbreviated as Jumiyyah Al-Irshad, which was founded by Achmad bin Muhammad Assurkati Al Anshari in Jakarta on 6 September 1914 (15 Shawwal 1332 AH), with the aim of fostering the Muslim community in the purity of Tawhid, worship, and Islamic practice based on the Qur'an and Sunnah.

== History ==
Permission for the opening and administration of Madrasah Al-Irshad Al-Islamiyyah was held by and in the name of Surkati. Based on the 1905 Teachers Ordinance (Staadsblad 550/1905), which regulated Islamic educational activities, Surkati's burden of responsibility would not be too heavy if the madrasah were sheltered under an organized legal entity. Thus preparations were made to establish Jam'iyyah Al-Ishlah wal Irsyad Al 'Arabiyyah. While the request for legalization was submitted to Governor-General A.W.F. Idenburg, the administration of the madrasah was carried out by a body named Haiah Madaaris Jum'iyyatul Irsyad, chaired by Sayyid Abdullah bin Abubakar Al-Habsyi. Although official approval from the Governor-General had not yet been issued, Shaykh Umar Yusuf Manggus succeeded in renting a former Hotel ORT building that was no longer in use at Molenvliet West 3, Batavia, to meet urgent needs due to extraordinary public interest. Al-Irshad as a legal entity finally obtained legal recognition from the Governor-General on 11 August 1915 through Decree No. 47, published in Javasche Courant No. 67, dated 20 August 1915.

In 1998, leadership within Al-Irshad, whose original name was Al-Irshad Al-Islamiyyah, split into two organizations: Al-Irshad Association and Al-Irshad Al-Islamiyyah.

In 2007, Farouk Badjabir and Masdun Pranoto officially established Al-Irshad Association, with the following name, nature, duration, and status:

1. The association is named "Jam'iyyah Al-Irshad," hereinafter referred to as "Al-Irshad Association."
2. The association has a special character, namely an Islamic creed-based association serving society in education, teaching, da'wah, and social humanitarian work, hereafter declared an Educational & Da'wah organization.
3. The association is independent and has no organizational ties with any political organization and does not participate in practical political activities.
4. Al-Irshad Association is established for an unlimited period until declared dissolved by its congress.
5. The Central Executive Board is domiciled in the capital city of the Republic of Indonesia.

Al-Irshad split into two similar but distinct organizations: Al-Irshad or Jam'iyyah Al-Irshad al-Islamiyyah (hereafter called al-Islamiyyah), as the official organization with a long historical struggle, and Al-Irshad Association, as a new organization born from internal ideological conflict. Ideologically, the two organizations stand from different perspectives. Al-Irshad Association is dominated by more exclusive views, while al-Islamiyyah is more moderate and inclusive. On various occasions the two organizations have accused each other. Al-Islamiyyah accuses the Association of being a nest of fundamentalists, whereas the Association accuses al-Islamiyyah of being a liberal faction.

In 2012, both organizations planned reconciliation (ishlah). If realized, this would mean one banner would disappear, though it was not yet known which one, depending on the congress results.

In 2019, Al-Irshad Al-Islamiyah issued an announcement and warning to parties using the name Al-Irshad Association anywhere, within 7×24 hours from the announcement, not to use the name Al-Irshad along with logos and trademarks that resembled those mentioned, in any form of media, online or offline, to avoid legal problems. However, no official response has yet been issued from Al-Irshad Association.

On 18 July 2017, the Fatwa Council of Al-Irshad Association was established through a meeting held at the Al-Irshad Association office on Jalan Kramat Raya No. 23, Central Jakarta. The Fatwa Council is independent and consists of several Sunni scholars competent in their respective fields, such as creed, jurisprudence, legal methodology, hadith, and inheritance law. The council holds sessions every four months. In each session, contemporary issues of the Muslim community written by individual scholars are discussed and decided whether a fatwa will be issued or postponed for revision.

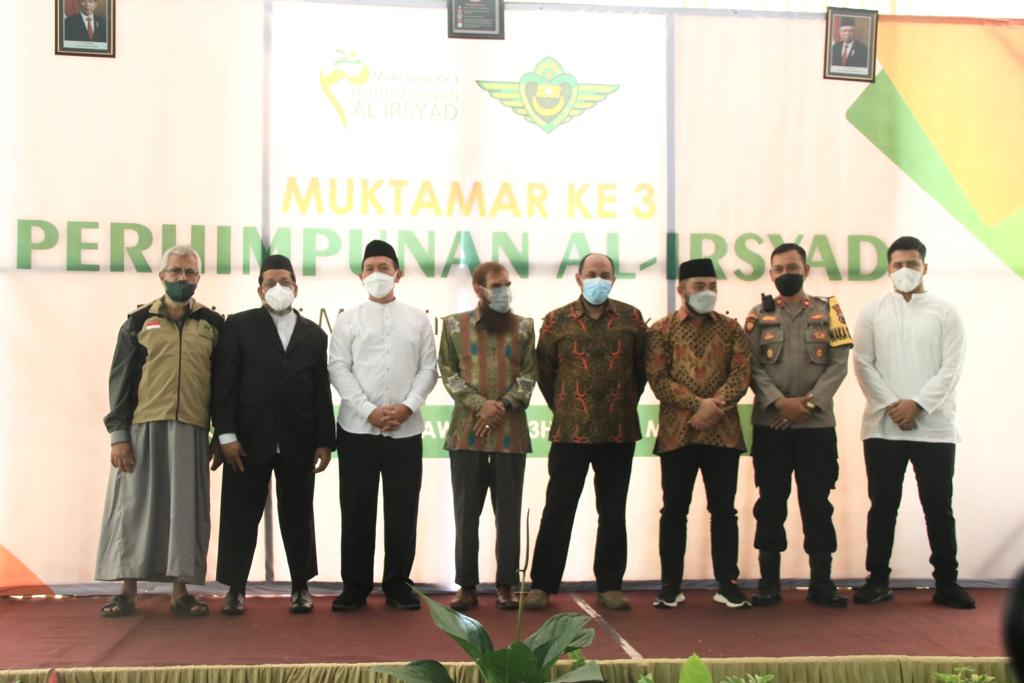
Muktamar III Perhimpunan Al-Irshad

In May 2022, the 3rd National Congress of Al-Irshad Association was held. The event took place at Pondok Pesantren Al-Irshad.

== Fatwa Council ==
The Fatwa Council of Al-Irshad Association was initially established on 18 July 2017. At that time, it consisted of eight members: Firanda Andirja as chairman, Nizar Saad Jabal as secretary, Syafiq Riza Basalamah, Sofyan bin Fuad Baswedan, Muhammad Arifin Badri, Muhammad Nur Ihsan, Roy Grafika Penataran, and Nafi' Zainuddin BSAW.

On 25 July 2017, the council expanded its membership with the inclusion of Khalid Basalamah and Musyaffa' Addariny. A few days later, on 1 August 2017, Erwandi Tarmizi joined the Fatwa Council.

On 31 August 2018, Anas Burhanudin joined the council to further strengthen and consolidate its structure. However, on 12 December 2018, Firanda Andirja resigned from the Fatwa Council of Al-Irshad Association.

In 2020, Emha Hasan Ayatullah joined the Fatwa Council.

=== Fatwa Decisions ===
==== Determination of the Beginning of Ramadan ====
Through this fatwa, the Fatwa Council of Al-Irshad Association urged Muslims in Indonesia to observe the Ramadan fast in accordance with the government's decision issued through the isbat session of the Ministry of Religious Affairs, in order to realize unity among Muslims. The council also advised that the celebration of Eid al-Fitr follow the decision of the isbat session based on the moon-sighting (ru'yatul hilal) conducted by the Ministry of Religious Affairs of the Republic of Indonesia. The council encouraged the government, particularly the Ministry of Religious Affairs of the Republic of Indonesia, to continue improving the organization of moon-sighting activities, as the results would serve as guidance for Muslims in performing their religious observances.
