= Syafiq Riza Basalamah =

Indonesian Salafi scholar and lecturer

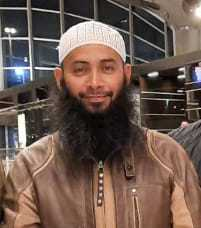
- Syafiq in Queen Alia International Airport, Jordan, 2020

Personal life
- Born: Syafiq Riza Hasan; 15 December 1977 (age 48) Jember, East Java, Indonesia
- Parent: Hasan bin Abdul Qadir bin Salim Basalamah (father)
- Education: LIPIA; Islamic University of Madinah
- Occupation: Ulama; Da'i; lecturer; writer

Religious life
- Religion: Islam
- Denomination: Sunni
- Movement: Salafi
- Website: syafiqrizabasalamah.com

Syafiq Riza Hasan Basalamah (born 15 December 1977), is an Indonesian Salafi scholar, lecturer, and author from Jember. He serves as a member of the Fatwa Council of the Al-Irshad Association. He is known for his numerous lecture videos on social media. A graduate of the Islamic University of Madinah, he earned cum laude honors from undergraduate to doctoral degree.

== Life ==
=== Lineage and early life ===
Syafiq Riza bin Hasan bin Abdul Qadir bin Salim bin Zaid Basalamah was born in Jember on 15 December 1977. The Basalamah family is one of the Arab Hadramaut clans from Yemen. He recounted that his great-grandfather, Salim bin Zaid Basalamah, migrated from Yemen to the Dutch East Indies before the 1900s. The ship carrying Salim docked at Teluk Bayur Port in Padang. In Padang, Salim married a Minangkabau woman and worked at the port while also teaching the Quran. Salim bin Zaid Basalamah died and was buried in Padang, but the exact location of his grave is no longer known. After Salim's death, his children moved to Batavia (now Jakarta). According to Syafiq's father, Syafiq's grandfather and his grandfather's siblings still spoke Minangkabau, as evidenced by the use of the term "ammi" (Indonesian: uncle) in Padang.

=== Education ===
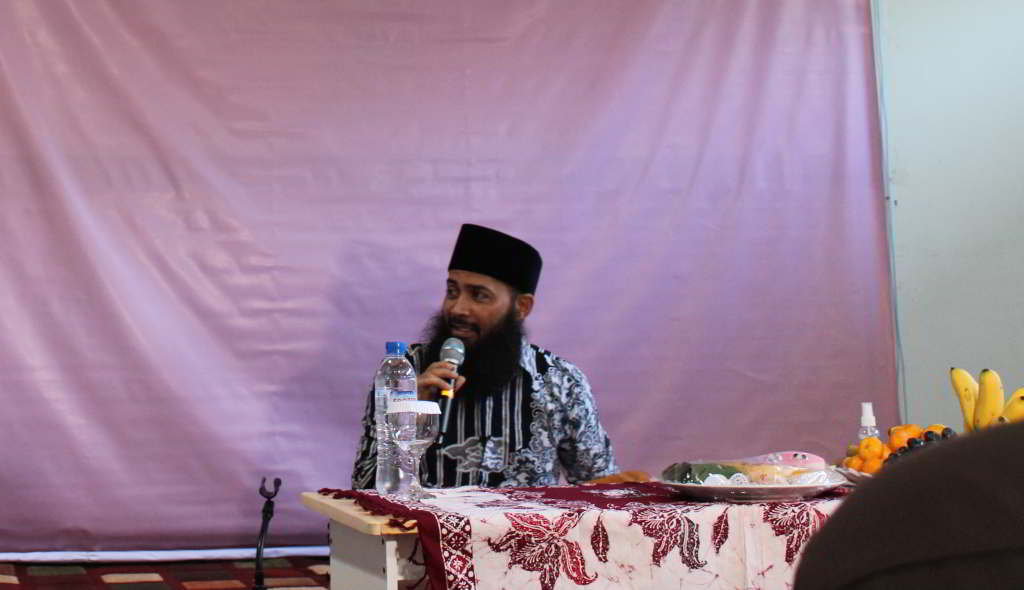
Syafiq Riza Basalamah gave a sermon at the Class I Immigration Office in Jember in 2020

Syafiq studied at the Al-Irsyad Al-Islamiyyah Islamic Boarding School in Bondowoso. He graduated from the madrasah tsanawiyah (Islamic junior high school) in 1993 and the madrasah aliyah (Islamic senior high school) at that boarding school in 1996. Upon graduation, he pursued an associate degree program at the LIPIA for one year in Jakarta and graduated in 1998.

After graduating from LIPIA, Syafiq was accepted into the Islamic University of Madinah. He first completed a Language Program (Syu'batul Lughah) at the university, finishing in 1999. He then earned his bachelor's degree in 2003, his master's degree in 2007, and his doctoral degree in 2013, all from the Department of Da'wah at the Faculty of Da'wah and Usuluddeen of the Islamic University of Madinah, graduating with honors (cum laude). His dissertation was titled "The Role of Islamic Institutions and Organizations in Countering Christianization in Indonesia" (Arabic: Juhuudu Al Muassasaat wal Hai’aat Al Islaamiyyah Fi Indonesia Fi At Tashoddi Li At Tanshiir). He successfully defended his dissertation in front of the examination teams consisting of Ali bin Ibrahim An-Namlah, Dr. Ghozi bin Ghozi Al-Mutthoiri, and Fuad Abduh al-Ba'daani.

=== Academia career ===
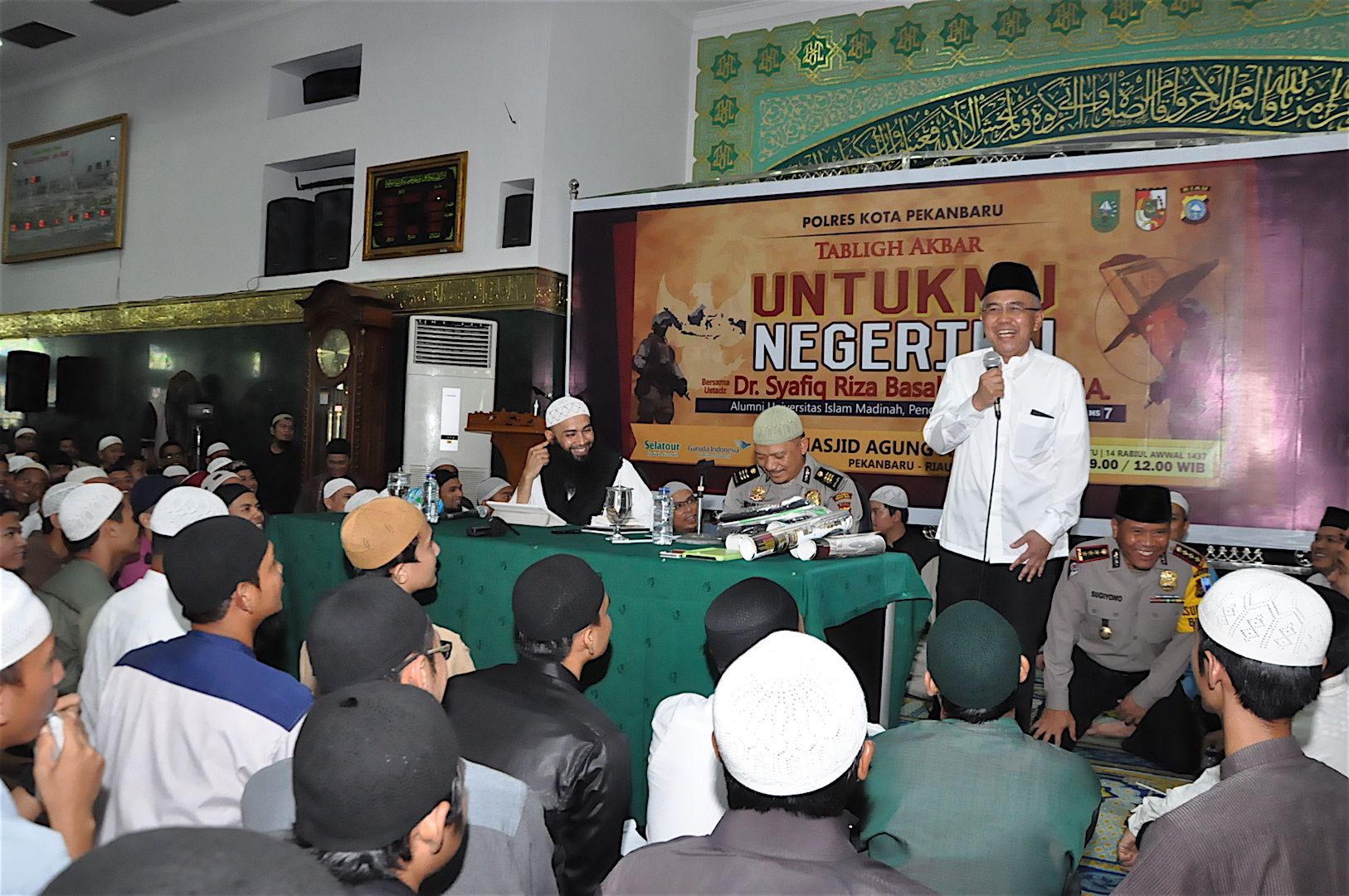
Syafiq Riza Basalamah delivered sermon in An-Nur Great Mosque, Pekanbaru, 2015

According to the Higher Education Database of the Ministry of Education, Culture, Research, and Technology (PDDikti Kemdikbudristek), Syafiq worked as an active permanent lecturer in the Ahwal Al-Syakhsiyah (family law) study program at the Imam Syafi'i Islamic Studies College in Jember since 2016. He teaches several courses, including methods of da'wah, Islamic ethics, prophetic biography (sirah nabawiyah), and others.

=== Controversy ===
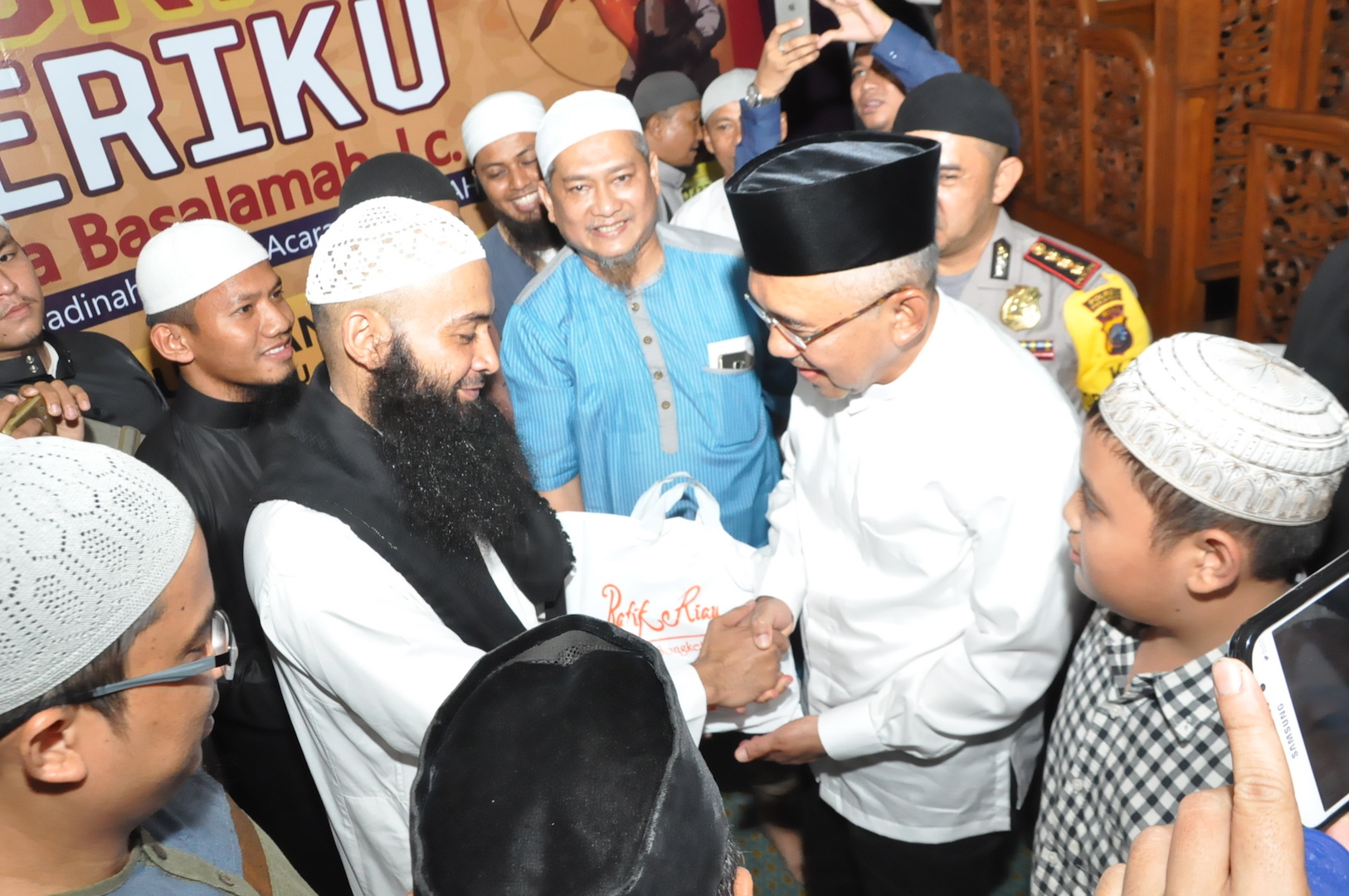
Syafiq Riza Basalamah shook hands with the Acting Governor of Riau, Arsyadjuliandi Rachman, in 2015.

In a clip from a sermon uploaded by Yufid.TV on YouTube in 2016, Syafiq urged people to pray for their leaders because it was meritorious and to avoid criticizing and disparaging them. However, in 2018, several unofficial accounts re-uploaded the video with the title changed to "#2019GantiPresiden?? [Do Not Criticize the Government] ▪ [Ustadz Syafiq Reza Basalamah]." The video with the politicized title was used by supporters of the incumbent presidential candidate, Joko Widodo, to counter Prabowo Subianto. However, during Ramadhan 1442 Hijri or 2021, Kristia Budiyarto (Dede), an Independent Commissioner of Pelayaran Nasional Indonesia (Pelni) and a staunch supporter of Joko Widodo, canceled Syfiq's lecture. Previously, Syafiq was invited by the Islamic Spiritual Body (Bakis) of Pelni to deliver the sermon. The cancellation was done unilaterally without the permission of the board of directors. Dede's reason for canceling the lecture was because Syafiq, along with other preachers such as Firanda Andirja, Khalid Basalamah, Rizal Yuliar Putrananda, and Subhan Bawazier, were accused of being radical preachers.

== Works ==
- جهود الشيخ أحمد السوركتي في الدعوة إلى الله في إندونيسيا
- Andai Aku Tidak Menikah Dengannya
- Rumahku Masih Ngontrak
- Mimpi Bertemu Nabi
- Bersama Keluarga Masuk Surga
- Berbekal Setengah Isi Setengah Kosong
