= Death of Wai Yan Tun =

Myanmar democracy martyr

Wai Yan Tun (Burmese: ဝေယံထွန်း; 2005 – 20 February 2021) was a 16-year-old worker and protester from Mandalay who was killed on 20 Feb 2021 during the 2021 Myanmar protests. He has become a focal point and an icon for demonstrators, with his image often displayed by people resisting the coup. Wai Yan emerged as an early martyr and symbol of resistance against the military junta's use of violence to suppress a protest movement. In honor of him, the 41 Street Market where he worked has been renamed Wai Yan Tun Night Market.

== Protest and death ==
On February 20, 2021, Wai Yan Tun was protesting in Thinbawgyin, Mandalay against the detainment of workers involved in the anti-coup movement. He was shot in the head while volunteering to help injured persons by his hand cart during the military forces opened fire on protesters at Thinbawgyin. He was one of two deaths of the first bloodshed in Myanmar’s second largest city, Mandalay. The United States Embassy issued "We are deeply troubled by the fatal shooting of protestors in Mandalay, a day after the Death of Mya Thwe Thwe Khine in Naypyidaw. The military must stop violence against the people of Myanmar".

Wai Yan Tun became the first child hero who died in Myanmar's Spring Revolution. His family used the money that he had saved to buy a phone and a motorcycle for his funeral. His death further intensified the protests and provided a morale boost to the protests by his last quote "I don't think I can make it. Remember my face. Say my name. May my courage live on. Continue this fight for me for I was taken away too soon".
