= Thet Naing Soe =

Burmese politician

- သက်နိုင်စိုး

Member of the House of Nationalities
- Incumbent
- Assumed office 3 February 2016
- Constituency: Tanintharyi Region № 2
- Majority: 44107 votes

Personal details
- Born: 5 April 1974 (age 52) Longlone Township, Tanintharyi Region
- Party: National League for Democracy
- Relations: Soe Thein (father)

Thet Naing Soe (Burmese: သက်နိုင်စိုး; born 5 April 1974) is a Burmese politician who currently serves as a House of Nationalities member of parliament for Tanintharyi Region № 2. He is a member of the National League for Democracy.

== Early life and education ==
Thet Naing Soe was born in Longlone, Tanintharyi Region on 5 April 1974. He graduated with BSc(Zoology) from Mawlamyine University. Previous employment is farmer.

== Political career ==
He is a member of the National League for Democracy. He was elected as an Amyotha Hluttaw MP, winning a majority of 44107 votes and elected representative from Tanintharyi Region № 2 parliamentary constituency.
