= Aaron Ezekiel Harif =

Hungarian scholar

Aaron Jacob ben Ezekiel Harif was a Jewish Hungarian scholar. As successor to Gerson Ashkenazi he held the post of rabbi in Nikolsburg at the same time that he was chief rabbi of the province of Moravia. The epithet "Ḥarif" (here meaning "the keen thinker") was also bestowed upon four of his ancestors, Ezekiel, Jacob, Ezekiel, and Isaac. Possibly he attained to the title by personal merit; for an inscription on his tombstone compares his death to the loss of the Ark of the Covenant. He died at Nikolsburg on 10 April 1670.
