= Ghafur Akbar Dharmaputra =

Indonesian diplomat (1964–2022)

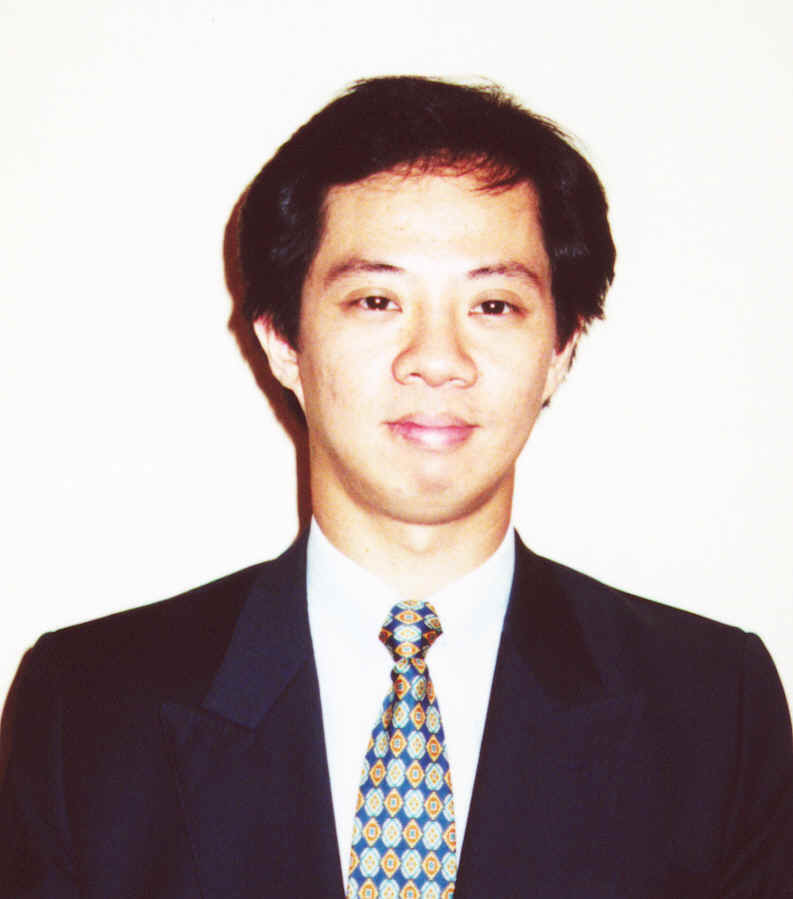
- Dharmaputra in 2000

Ambassador of Indonesia to Ukraine, Georgia, and Armenia
- In office 17 November 2021 – 12 May 2022
- President: Joko Widodo
- Preceded by: Yuddy Chrisnandi
- Succeeded by: Arief Muhammad Basalamah

Deputy for Women and Children Protection to the Coordinating Ministry for Human Development and Culture
- In office 23 April 2018 – 6 August 2020; Acting until 6 May 2019
- Minister: Puan Maharani; Muhadjir Effendy
- Preceded by: Sudjatmiko
- Succeeded by: Femmy Eka Kartika Putri (Youth, Women, and Children Quality Improvement)

Personal details
- Born: February 16, 1964 Bandung, Indonesia
- Died: May 12, 2022 (aged 58) Jakarta, Indonesia
- Spouse: Endah Purniawati
- Children: 2
- Parents: Garnawan Dharmaputra (father); Erna Farida (mother)
- Education: Sebelas Maret University (S.E.); University of Wollongong (M.Com)
- Awards: Hassan Wirajuda Award (2023)

Ghafur Akbar Dharmaputra (16 February 1964 – 12 May 2022) was an Indonesian diplomat who served as ambassador to Ukraine, Armenia and Georgia from 2021 until his death in 2022. A graduate of the Sebelas Maret University, he served as the director of economic and environment development in the foreign ministry and various senior positions within the coordinating ministry for human and cultural development.

== Early life and education ==
Ghafur was born in Bandung on 16 February 1964 to Garnawan Dharmaputra, a career diplomat who served as ambassador to Syria from 1981 to 1984, and Erna Farida. Ghafur had four siblings. He studied economics at the Sebelas Maret University from 1982 until graduating in 1986, with the distinction as the best and fastest student to graduate from his cohort. He was also active in Lingkar Studi Pembangunan (LSP) FE UNS, his major's academic forum; Nurul Huda, the college's mosque; as well as within the Muslim Students' Association. He later received a master's degree in commerce, with a honours distinction, from the University of Wollongong in 1993.

== Diplomatic career ==
Ghafur began his career within the foreign ministry in 1988 as a staff at the directorate for multilateral economic cooperation. In 1993, he received his first overseas assignment at the economic section of the embassy in Mexico. He began his tenure with a diplomatic rank of third secretary before promoted to second secretary. He then returned to the foreign ministry in 1996 for a three-year stint as the chief of World Trade Organization section within the directorate for multilateral economic cooperation.

Ghafur returned for another round of foreign posting at the economic section of the embassy in Washington, D.C. in 1999 with the diplomatic rank of first secretary. He was then promoted to counsellor before returning in 2003. He was subsequently appointed as the deputy director within the ASEAN economic cooperation directorate, serving until 2006. Afterwards, he was stationed at the embassy in Cairo for economic affairs with the initial diplomatic rank of counsellor, earning a promotion to minister-counsellor sometime during his duty there.

Ghafur became the foreign ministry's director for economic and environment development on 24 April 2008. Early in his term, Ghafur represented Indonesia as a delegate to the 2008 United Nations Climate Change Conference. He the became Indonesia's consul general in New York on 21 December 2011, officially beginning his duties with exequatur on 13 February 2012. Ghafur's term in office ended on 12 January 2016.

== Coordinating ministry ==
On 22 December 2016, coordinating minister for human and cultural development Puan Maharani appointed Ghafur as her advisor (expert staff) for post-2015 implementation of Sustainable Development Goals in Indonesia. Ghafur was then entrusted to run the day-to-day duties of the coordinating ministry's deputy for women and children protection on 23 April 2018, before being appointed as the acting officeholder on 2 May. Upon passing an assesment process, he was permanently appointed for the position on 6 May 2019. As deputy, Ghafur announced the launching of a website for pre-marriage counseling by the government and encouraged companies to receive Economic Dividends for Gender Equality (EDGE) certification to ensure gender equality within their workplace. Ghafur also played a role in coordinating different government agencies in formulating a system to prevent and handle violence against children.

Ghafur returned to his prior advisory role as the minister's advisor for sustainable development on 6 August 2020. In this role, Ghafur played a role in introducing economic education from the government to pre-married couples. Businessman Jaya Suprana in 2021 recommended president Joko Widodo to appoint Ghafur for a national level role responsible in supervising the implementation of SDGs in government agencies.

== Ambassador to Ukraine ==
On 4 June 2021, Ghafur was nominated by President Joko Widodo as ambassador to Ukraine, with concurrent accreditation to Armenia and Georgia. His nomination was approved by the House of Representatives first commission after passing an assessment on 12 July 2021 and was installed as ambassador on 17 November 2021. He presented copies of his credentials to Ukraine's deputy foreign minister Dmytro Senik on 15 February 2022, nine days before the Russo-Ukrainian war commenced. He retained the status of ambassador-designate throughout his entire ambassadorial term, as he never officially presented his credentials to any heads of state under his jurisdiction.

At the time of his arrival in Ukraine, Ghafur was diagnosed with terminal cancer. Against his physician's recommendation to rest for a total recovery, Ghafur continued his ambassadorial duties, planning to continue his cancer therapy in Ukraine. Ghafur led the coordination of evacuation for Indonesian citizens in Ukraine shortly after the start of the war, with Ghafur personally accompanying every wave of evacuation. A total of more than 100 Indonesian citizens were evacuated to Poland and Romania.

After a month of evacuation, Ghafur and his nine-men team temporarily relocated to Slovakia. He was then transferred to Indonesia to receive intensive care at Medistra Hospital due to the extreme fatigue he faced from coordinating the evacuations. In the midst of his treatment, he continued to lead embassy meetings online. He eventually died on the night of 12 May 2022 at the hospital and was buried at the Tanah Kusir Cemetery the next day. According to former deputy foreign minister Dino Patti Djalal, Ghafur presented reports of his work to the foreign ministry's director general for America and Europe Umar Hadi just several minutes before his death. He posthumously received the Hassan Wirajuda award, the foreign ministry's supreme award, for citizen protection in January 2023.

== Personal life ==
Ghafur was married to Endah Purniawati, with whom he had a daughter and a son.
