= Arif =

Aref may refer to:

- Arif, a local name for the Rif mountains in northern Morocco
- ‘arif, a concept in Sufism, see Ma'rifa
- Arif gang
- TCG Ütğm Arif Ekmekçi (A-575), auxiliary ship of the Turkish Navy
- Arif (given name)
- Arif (surname)
