= Arief Muhammad Basalamah =

Indonesian diplomat (born 1966)

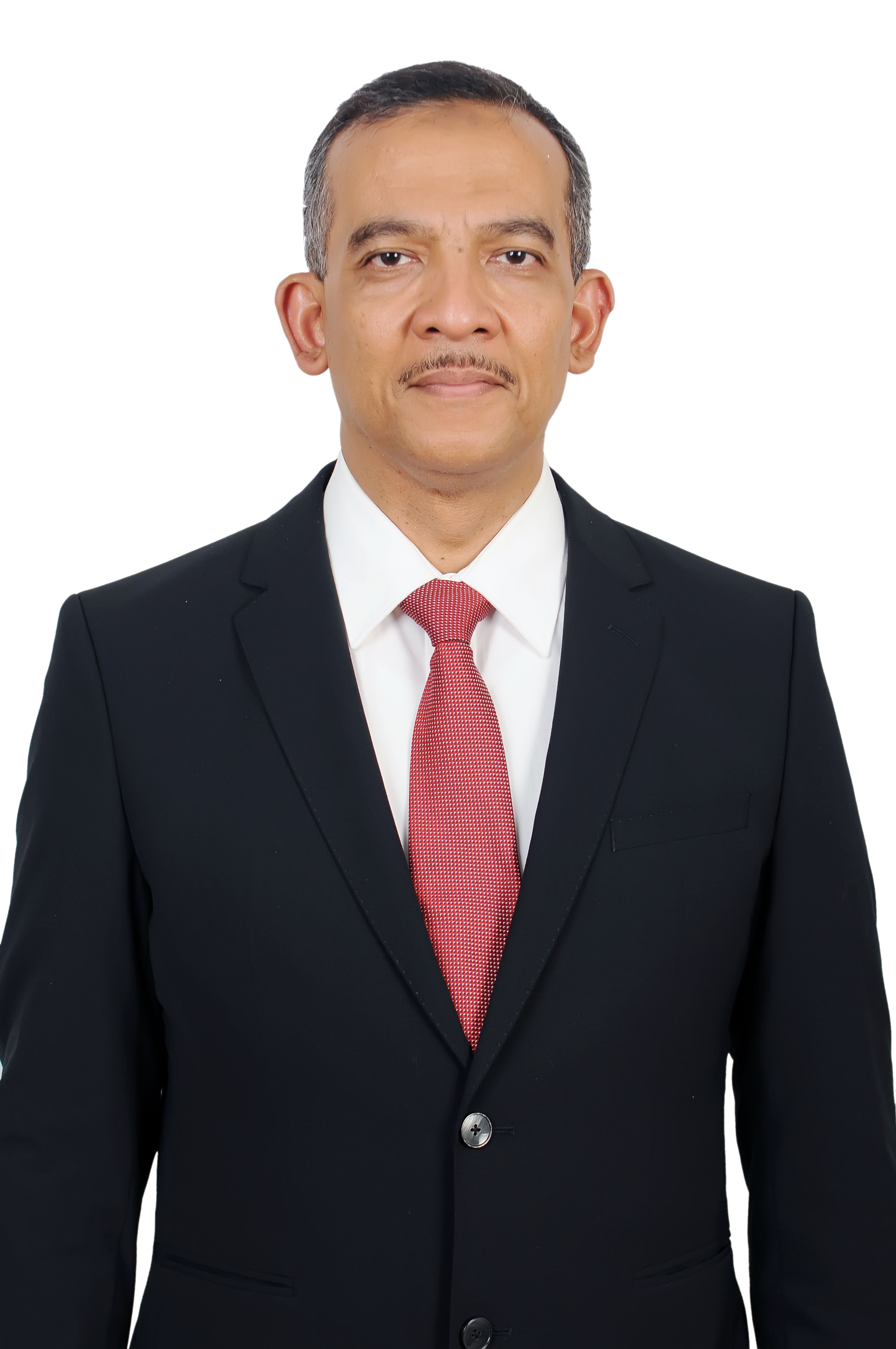

Ambassador of Indonesia to Ukraine, Georgia, and Armenia
- Incumbent
- Assumed office 28 September 2023
- Preceded by: Ghafur Akbar Dharmaputra

Personal details
- Born: 27 February 1966 (age 60)
- Education: Padjadjaran University

Arief Muhammad Basalamah (born 27 February 1966) is an Indonesian diplomat who is currently serving as resident ambassador to Ukraine, with concurrent accreditation to Georgia and Armenia. Previously, he served as consul general in Marseille, France, from 2020 to 2023.

== Education ==
Arief Muhammad Basalamah was born on 27 February 1966. He studied international relations at the Padjadjaran University in Bandung, graduating in 1990. He attended several international trainings for diplomat, such as at the Institute for Diplomacy and Foreign Relations, Malaysia, in 1995 and a course on policy planning at the Clingendael Institute in The Hague in 2010.

== Career ==
Arief 's career as a diplomat began upon completing his basic diplomatic training in 1993. He was assigned as section chief at the ASEAN National Secretariat's bureau for economic affairs from 1994 to 1996. His first overseas posting was as a staff for economic affairs at the embassy Tunis, from 1997 to 2000, with the rank of third secretary. During his posting in Tunis, he also acted as the acting chief of political affairs for a few months in 1998.

Upon his return to Jakarta in 2000, he became the chief of information and scholarship affairs at the foreign ministry's center for education and training, where he was responsible in collecting information on scholarships for foreign ministry staff as well as conducting oversight and monitoring on the candidates. Upon completing his mid-level diplomatic training in 2001 and at the National Institute of Public Administration in 2002, he was promoted to become the head of diplomatic training at the center, where he was responsible in preparing basic, mid-level, and senior diplomatic trainings. He was then posted to the embassy in London in the political section with the rank of second secretary, and later, first secretary. From 2006 to 2007 he was also the assistant head of the chancery.

Following his service in the United Kingdom, he was reassigned to the foreign ministry as deputy director at the Directorate for Intra-Regional Cooperation of Asia, Pacific, and Africa from 2008 to 2010. During this time, he was responsible for matters relating to regional forums such as the IOR-ARC, ACD, AMED, PIF, SwPD, and CTI-CFF. He also attended a senior diplomatic course and an advanced course held by the National Institute of Public Administration. Upon finishing his senior education, he was posted to the consulate general in Vancouver to head the economic affairs section as a consul with the rank of minister counsellor, as well as the head of chancery from 2011 to 2014. He returned to the foreign ministry with an assignment as the chief of general affairs in the directorate general for American and European affairs from 2014 to 2016 and as chief of the ministry's diplomatic functional management for a few months in 2017. On 26 April 2017, he was named as the inaugural head of the center for management of functional positions in the foreign ministry. He was promoted to the diplomatic rank of minister in 2018 and served until 2020.

On 1 July 2020, Arief was appointed as consul general in Marseille, with consular service covering PACA, Corsica, and Occitanie (excluding Lot), and the departments of Pyrénées-Atlantiques, Ardèche and Drôme. He received his exequatur from the French foreign ministry in February 2021. In December 2022, Arief was nominated as ambassador to Ukraine, with concurrent accreditation to Georgia and Armenia, by President Joko Widodo. After passing an assessment by the house of representative's first commission the next month, on 26 June 2023 he officially assumed office. He presented her credentials to President of Ukraine Volodymyr Zelenskyy on 17 August, to President of Armenia Vahagn Khachaturyan on 14 November, and to President of Georgia Salome Zourabichvili on 20 December.

== Awards ==
- Civil Servants' Long Service Medal, 3rd Class (Indonesian: Satyalancana Karya Satya X Tahun) (2002)
- Civil Servants' Long Service Medal, 2nd Class (Indonesian: Satyalancana Karya Satya XX Tahun) (2012)

== Personal life ==
Arief Muhammad Basalamah is married and has two children.
