= Harif Guzman =

Harif Guzman (born March 23, 1975) is a contemporary artist living in New York City. His work has been exhibited internationally as well as across the United States. He first gained recognition for his work as a street artist in New York. Often executed in collage form, Guzman's work is vibrant, provocative and dark in nature. He is known for exploring topics such as women, materialism and popular culture.

== Early life ==
Born in Venezuela, Guzman came to the United States in 1980 when he was five years old. His father was a printer and typesetter, and in his youth, Guzman worked in his father's print shop and gained an appreciation for mechanical reproduction.

During a period of time when he was homeless, Guzman began tagging his name on the streets of New York. He became recognized for his work and his career as an artist flourished. Known for his alter ego "Haculla", Guzman's created character has become an iconic figure in New York City street art. Today Guzman's street art inspired work can be seen in the tunnel at the Dream Hotel in New York Guzman has worked with artists such as Theo Tarrega and model Luka Sabbat.

Guzman's latest works will be previewed in a solo show entitled “Three Wishes” during the 2021 edition of Art Dubai that will last until April 3.

== Technique ==
Guzman's work is inspired by 1920s Dada art, 1960s Pop art, and 1990s street art, and by the chaos of New York City. Further inspiration is the result of Guzman's earliest experiences of image making that he encountered working in his father's print shop as a boy.

== Critical reception ==
Guzman's work has been purchased by Tommy Hilfiger, Uma Thurman and Dag Cramer. He was featured at The Whitney Museum of American Art in May 2013, the GR Gallery in New York City in 2020, and at the Paul Fisher Gallery.

Guzman has collaborated with companies such as Ralph Lauren, Volcom and Burtons. His work has also been featured in Italian Vogue, Sugar Skateboard Magazine, Thrasher, Sport and Street, Flaunt Magazine and Oyster Magazine.
