= Khalid Basalamah =

Indonesian preacher, prominent figure in the Salafi movement and entrepreneur

Personal life
- Born: Khalid Zeed Abdullah Basalamah; 1 May 1975 (age 51) Ujung Pandang, South Sulawesi, Indonesia
- Children: 4
- Education: Islamic University of Madinah; Muslim University of Indonesia; Universiti Tun Abdul Razak
- Occupation: Cleric; Businessman; Writer
- Website: khbofficial.com

Religious life
- Religion: Islam
- Denomination: Sunni
- Movement: Salafi

Khalid Zeed Abdullah Basalamah (born 1 May 1975) is an Indonesian preacher, a prominent figure in the Salafi movement, and an entrepreneur. He serves as a member of the Sharia advisory board at Rahmatan Lil 'Alamin Boarding School in Solok Regency, West Sumatra.

== Early life ==
Khalid Zeed Abdullah Basalamah was born in Ujung Pandang (now Makassar), South Sulawesi, on 1 May 1975. He is the son of Ustaz Zeed Abdullah Basalamah (1940–2020), the founder of Addaraen Mosque and Islamic Boarding School in Makassar. His mother died in 1979 when he was four years old. After his wife's death, Zeed Basalamah remarried around two or three years later. Khalid's stepmother, A. Kasmawati Tahir Z. Basalamah (born in 1957), served as a substitute member of the House of Representatives (DPR-RI) for the 2004–2009 period from the Reform Star Party, representing South Sulawesi I, replacing Andi Djalal Bachtiar.

== Career ==
=== Dawah ===
In 1999, Khalid Basalamah began delivering Friday sermons at the Muslim University of Indonesia (UMI). He then increasingly accepted offers to be a preacher and resigned from his job as a lecturer. After that, he also started offering free hadith classes.

According to Mohammad Muhtador from IAIN Kudus, Khalid Basalamah combines academic knowledge based on the works of earlier scholars, such as Bulugh al-Maram by Ibn Hajar al-'Asqalani or Minhajul Muslim by Abu Bakr al-Jazaeri, with the use of modern platforms like YouTube and other social media. Erwin Jusuf Thaib also discusses this in his book, which explores the phenomenon of preachers utilizing social media as a medium for their da'wah in the 2010s. In addition to broadcasting da'wah content in a simple language style, Khalid also shares his da'wah activities on social media to reach a broader audience.

At the 3rd Meeting of Scholars and Preachers from Southeast Asia, Europe, and Africa in 2017, Khalid received the "Honorary Scholar and Preacher" award from the Multaqo Adduat and Scholars of Southeast Asia.

On March 25, 2023, Khalid was awarded the title of professor and became an adjunct lecturer at the Universal Institute of Professional Management for the 2023–2024 period.

=== Other activities ===
Khalid is involved in several business activities, primarily through PT Ajwad, who operates a Middle Eastern cuisine restaurant that offers a Quran memorization program for employees and does not provide service to guests during prayer times. In addition, he also serves as the chairman of the Ats-Tsabat Foundation in East Jakarta. He runs various creative charity programs, including scholarships, free Umrah trips, clean water wells, and motorcycles for Da'i (preacher). Khalid published a book titled Palestina yang Terlupakan (Palestine: The Forgotten) in 2018.

== Controversy ==
Khalid once faced rejection, leading to his religious gathering being disbanded by the Ansor Youth Movement, the youth organization of Nahdlatul Ulama (NU), and its paramilitary wing Banser in Sidoarjo, East Java, in 2017. This action was taken because his teachings were considered inconsistent with the religious practices (religious traditions) of the "Nahdliyyin" community. Reports on the incident were contradictory, depending on the editorial interests of each media outlet, such as ArrahmahNews.com, which leans towards NU, and Kumparan, which presented the news without bias. At that time, Mahfud MD disagreed with the disbandment, while the Minister of Religious Affairs, Lukman Hakim Saifuddin, responded with a neutral stance. In response, the chairman of GP Ansor maintained his position. In discussions regarding the view that his preaching was contrary to NU's Islamic culture, Khalid rejected the claim that foreign countries sponsored him.
