= Sport climbing at the SEA Games =

Competition climbing was first included at the Southeast Asian Games in the 2011 edition. It was scrapped the following edition. It will return at the 2025 SEA Games in Thailand after fourteen years of absence.

== Editions ==
Year	Edition	Host country	No. of events	Best nation
2011	26th	Indonesia	10	Indonesia
2025	33rd	Thailand	6	Indonesia

== Medal table ==
As of the 2025 Southeast Asian Games

Rank	Nation	Gold	Silver	Bronze	Total
1	Indonesia (INA)	11	6	1	18
2	Thailand (THA)	2	3	3	8
3	Philippines (PHI)	1	0	1	2
4	Singapore (SIN)	0	2	8	10
5	Malaysia (MAS)	0	1	2	3
6	Vietnam (VIE)	0	1	0	1
Totals (6 entries)		14	13	15	42
