= Singapore at the 2011 SEA Games =

Singapore at the 2011 Southeast Asian Games
- IOC code: SIN
- NOC: Singapore National Olympic Council
- Website: www.singaporeolympics.com (in English)

in Jakarta and Palembang
- Competitors: 417 in 33 sports
- Officials: 206
- Medals Ranked 5th: Gold 42 Silver 45 Bronze 73 Total 160

Southeast Asian Games appearances (overview)
- 1959; 1961; 1965; 1967; 1969; 1971; 1973; 1975; 1977; 1979; 1981; 1983; 1985; 1987; 1989; 1991; 1993; 1995; 1997; 1999; 2001; 2003; 2005; 2007; 2009; 2011; 2013; 2015; 2017; 2019; 2021; 2023; 2025; 2027; 2029

Singapore participated in the 2011 Southeast Asian Games which was held in the cities of Jakarta and Palembang, Indonesia from 11 November 2011 to 22 November 2011, but with some events commencing from 3 November 2011.

== Participation details ==
Singapore sent a total contingent of 623 to the 2011 SEA Games: of 417 competitors and 206 officials. They participated in 34 of the 48 sports in the Games.

Participation and medal targets
Sport	Competitors	Gold Medal Target	Gold Medals in previous games
Archery	13		0
Aquatics	23 (Swimming), 26 (Water polo), 11 (Synchronised swimming), 23 (Open Water swimming)	14 (Swimming), 1 (Water polo)	14 (Swimming), 1 (Water polo)
Athletics	28	6 (any colour)	2
Badminton	19		0
Basketball	12		Not held
Billiards and Snooker	7		2
Bridge	13		Not held
Bowling	12		Not held
Boxing	2		0
Canoeing/Kayaking	13		Not held
Cycling	12		0
Fencing	20		Not held
Football	20		0
Golf	7		0
Gymnastics	14		Not held
Judo	3		0
Karatedo	1		0
Pencak Silat	15		1
Pétanque	2		0
Roller skating	6	0 (1 Silver, 1 Bronze)	Not held
Rowing	4		Not held
Sailing	11		Not held
Sepak takraw	5		0
Shooting	10		6
Softball	34		0
Table tennis	8	3	6
Taekwondo	5		0
Traditional boat race	28		Not held
Wall climbing	12		Not held
Water skiing	6		Not held
Weightlifting	1		Did not participate
Wrestling	3		0
Wushu	8		1

No athletes were fielded for Baseball, Chess, Equestrian, Fin swimming, Futsal, Kenpō, Paragliding, Tennis, Volleyball and Vovinam.

== Athletes ==
Sport	Athlete/s	Event/s
Archery	Ong Chee Bin Benson; Teo Kee Hui Keith Tan Si Lie; Pang Toh Jin; Loh Tze Rong Vanessa; Tan Liu Jie Wendy; Cheok Khang Leng Elizabeth; Lui Su Lin; Ong Chong Soon Michael; Kwong Kok Fong Eugene; Heng Fook Hup Vinson; Tay Han Yuen Shawn; Ng Yuqin Kimberly	Recurve Individual (Male Team) Recurve Individual ( Women's team) Compound Individual, Team (M) Compound Individual (W)
Athletics	Muhd Elfi Mustapa; Yeo Foo Ee Gary; Kang Li Loong Calvin; Lee Cheng Wei; Ng Chin Hui; Kenneth Khoo; Mok Ying Ren; Muhd Zaki Sapari; Yap Jin Wei Timothee; Muhd Amirudin Jamal; Lim Yao Peng; Tan Wei Sheng Lance; Let Jian Jie; Muhd Firdaus Juhari; Tseng Ke Chen; Chong Mingxun; Chan Sheng Yao; Wong Wei Gen Scott; Wong Tuck Yim James; Valerie Seema Pereira; Wendy Enn; Charlene Oh Shi Ning; Renuka Satianathan; Dipna Lim Prasad; Piriyah T. Sharda Nikita; Qi Hui; Rachel Isabel Bingjie Yang; Zhang Guirong; Wan Lay Chi	100m, 4 × 100 m Relay; 100m, 4 × 100 m Relay; 200m, 4 × 100 m Relay; 200m, 4 × 100 m Relay; 400m, 4 × 400 m Relay; 400m, 4 × 400 m Relay; 5,000m, Marathon; 400m hurdles, 4 × 400 m 400m hurdles 4 × 100 m Relay; 4 × 100 m Relay; 4 × 400 m Relay; 4 × 400 m Relay; 4 × 400 m Relay; Triple Jump; Pole Vault; Pole Vault; Shot Put; Discus; 200m, 4 × 400 m Relay; 400m, 4 × 400 m Relay; 400m, 4 × 400 m Relay; 10,000m 100m hurdles, 4 × 400 m Relay; 400m hurdles, 4 × 400 m Relay; 800m, 4 × 400 m Relay; Marathon; Pole Vault; Shot Put, Discus; Shot Put
Badminton		
Basketball	Lim Wai Sian; Wong Wei Long; Ng Hanbin; Wu Qingde; Oh Wei Jie Desmond; Koh Kok Siang Gary; Koh Meng Koon; Wong Soon Yuh; Lim Shengyu; Khoo Kian Huat Steven; Goh Kok Chiang Delvin; Pathman Matialakan	Men's team
Billiards		
Bowling	Jason Yeong-Nathan; Low Eng Howe Basil; Ng Tiac Pin; Low Youjing Eugene; Saw Hui-Xun Keith Ng Chiew Pang; Jazreel Tan Shi Hua; Ng Lin Zhi Shayna; New Hui Fen; Tan Shi Jing Daphne; Tan Shi Hua Cherie; Jasmine Yeong-Natha	Team, Singles, Doubles, Trios, T-Five, Master Male . Team, Singles, Doubles, Trios, T-Five, Master (W).
Boxing	Muhd Ridhwan Ahmad; Mohd Hanurdeen Hamid	60 kg 52 kg
Bridge		
Canoeing		
Cycling	Adi Putera Yusoff; Goh Choon Huat; Ho Jun Rong; Junaidi Hashim; Darren Low; Low Ji Wen; Marcus Leong; Ian Francis Krempl; Tan Hong Chun; Ang Kee Meng; Chan Siew Kheng Dinah; Serene Lee	180 km Road (M). 180 km team Road (M); 180 km team Road, 70 km team Time Trial (M). 180 km team Road, 70 km team Time Trial (M). 180 km team Road. 50 km Time Trial Ind., 70 km team Time Trial (M). 180 km team Road (M). 50 km Time Trial Ind., 70 km team Time Trial (M). Down Hill 1.5 km (M). Down Hill 1.5 km (M). 10 km Scratch Race, 40 km Point Race (M). 120 km Road Race Ind., 24 km Time Trial Ind. (W). 120 km Road Race Ind. (W).
Fencing	Wang Wenying; Ruth Ng Yi Ling; Cheryl Wong Ye Han; Joan Ang Liting; Nona Lim Yean Hong; Ann Lee Hui Min Sabre; Felicia Yam Hui Tse; Ann Karin Melbye; Magdalene Huang Xin En; Victoria Ann Lim; Nicolette Soh Junyi; Wu Jie; Tan Yuan Zi; Zhang Zhenggang; Mathew Lam Hin Yui; Lim Weiwen; Samson Lee Mun Hoe; Mikail Ling Tai Huang; Willie Khoo Zi Le; Ernest Chua	Foil Individual, Team (W); Foil Individual, Team (W); Foil Team (W); Foil Team (W); Sabre Individual, Team (W); Individual, Team (W); Sabre Team (W); Épée Individual, Team (W); Épée Individual, Team (W); Épée Team (W); Épée Team (W); Foil Individual, Team (M); Foil Individual, Team (M); Foil Team (M); Foil Team (M); Épée Individual, Team (M); Épée Individual, Team (M); Épée Team (M); Épée Team (M); Sabre Individual (M)
Football	Chan Yuhui Jasper; Hariss s/o Harun; Loo Zhan Quan Gary; Mohd Izwan Mahbud; Mohd Afiq Yunos; Mohd Firdaus Kasman; Muhd Al-Qaasimy A Rahman; Muhd Fairoz Hasan; Muhd Faris Ramli; Muhd Fazli Ayob; Muhd Hafiz Abu Sujad; Muhd Irwan Shah Arismail; Muhd Khairul Nizam Kamal; Muhd Nazrul Ahmad Nazari; Muhd Safuwan Baharudin; Muhd Shahir Hamzah; Muhd Zulfahmi Mohd Arifin; Navin Nigel Vanu; Safirul Sulaiman; Shahdan Sulaiman	Men's team
Golf	Ng En Yong Jerome; Ong Chong Ching Marc; Foo Yong En Gregory; Choo Tze Huang; Yong Wei Ping Amelia; Loi Shu-Ning Stephanie; Koh Sock Hwee	Individual, Team (M) Individual Team, Women's.
Gymnastics	Lim Heem Wei; Nur Atikah Nabilah Jurfrie; Foo En Ning; Giam Pei Shi Rachel; Khoo Oon Hui Krystal; Tam Jing Ying Joey; Tay Kai Cheng Timothy; Gan Gabriel Zi Jie; Tay Wei An Terry; Seah Kang Wei; Gan Gregory Zi Chao; Hoe Wah Toon; Phaan Yi Lin; Sim Kwee Peng Ann	Artistic Team & Individual (W) Artistic Team & Individual (M) Rhythmic Individual all-around
Judo	Ang Xuan Yi 57 kg (W); Vanessa Ng Ju	57 kg (W); No Kata (W)
Open Water Swimming	Chelsea Fuchs; Brandon Boon Ji Xing; Kenneth Lim Duan Le	5 km, 10 km (W); 5 km, 10 km (M); 5 km (M)
Petanque	Cheng Zhi Ming Shooting; Heo Boon Hua	Men; Women
Roller Sports		
Rowing	Nadzrie Hyckell Hamzah; Yeong Wai Mun; Joanna Chan Lai Cheng; Saiyidah Aisyah Rafaee	LM2X (M); LM1X, LM2X (M); W2X (W); W1X, W2X (W)
Sailing	Kan Russell Tsung Liang; Koh Terence Seng Kiat; Choo Terence Jian Jie; Liu Dawn Xiaodan; Tan Sara Li Ching; Chan Victoria Jing Hua; Yokoyama Elisa Yukie; Pow Weng Loong Shaun; Ong Leonard; Ng Amanda Ling Kai; Yong Audrey Pei Lin	Int’l 470 Class (M); Int’l 470 Class (M); Laser Class Radial (M); Int’l 47 Class (W); Int’l 47 Class (W); Laser Class Radial (W); Optimist Class (Open); Mistral OD (M); RSX (M); Mistral OD (W); RSX (W)
Sepak Takraw		
Shooting		
Silat		
Softball	Ganesan Ramasamy; Goh Keng Ngee Kenny; Toh Boon Han Collin; Ngiam Jun Jie Gerann; Lew Cheng Chye Marcus; Li Yekai Gabriel; Liew Kuang Hao; Lim Jun Cheng Alvin; Muhd Farhan Harahap; Ng Cheong Yong; Ng Ee Han Ivan; Dayalan Senthil; Sim Kiang Kai Leonard; Tan Jing Wen Keefe; Tan Yi Rui; Chua Hui Fu; Phua Chang Sheng Ivan; Chua Ling Ling Elaine; Keong Yumei; Ho Sz Wha; Fu Xinghan; Guo Yan Xiu Yan; Koh Aimei Michelle; Koh Ruoh Yan; Lam Desa; Chow Ming Ying Magdelyn; Wang Jing Fang; Goh Lina; Gan Hsiu Lun Sonia; Ng Jing Hui Cerigwen; Kang Meisian; Irianti Putri Irawan Fatullah; So Yi Lam; Chuang Chea Chee	Men's team Women's team
Sport Climbing	Janice Ng Li. Judith Sim. Zhang Binbin.	Team Speed Climbing
Swimming		
Synchronised Swimming	Lee Mei Shuang. Krishnan Mei Shan. Sung Chui Ying Priscilla. Yap Yu Hui. Tay Aik Ping. Chew Wei Ling Geraldine. Zhang Hui. Elisabeth Tan Si Lynn. Chen Mei Chuen Samantha. Chen Mei Qi Stephanie. Chen Mei Qing Natalie.	Team Tech, Team Free, Combination, Duet.
Table Tennis		
Taekwondo		
Traditional Boat Race ('Dragon Boat')		
Waterpolo	Tay Sin Chao Nigel. Lin Diyan. Lin Diyang. Teo Eugene Zhen Wei. Koh Jian Ying. Chong Brandon Wei-Ren. Lim Yaoxiang. Tan Paul Jwee Ann. Loh Zhi Zhi. Ong Kelvin Weisheng. Luo Nan. Quek Byron Ruisheng. Goh Marcus Chengwei. Low Seet Teng. Teo Angeline Yi Ling. Tan Su-Lynn. Sim Shauna Hwei Sian. Yew Adelyn Yan Xiang. Loke En Yuan. Kan Mary Enci. Tan Lynnette Jane Hui Ying. Ong Cheng Jing. Chia T-Chien. Loh Hui Hui Valerie. Poh Zhi Ning. Chow Chung Shan Jacquline.	Men's team Women's team
Waterski		
Weightlifting	Helena Wong Kar Mun	53 kg (W)
Wrestling	Huang Jun-En Gabriel; Aaron Koh Sheng Min; Chua Jun Xian Aloysius	Freestyle 55 kg (M); Freestyle 60 kg (M); Freestyle 66 kg (M)
Wushu		

== Medals ==
Sport	Gold	Silver	Bronze	Total
Swimming	17	9	13	39
Table Tennis	5	4	0	9
Sailing	4	1	3	8
Bowling	3	2	2	7
Canoeing	2	5	3	10
Athletics	2	3	2	7
Water Polo	2	0	0	2
Bridge	1	5	3	9
Water Ski	1	3	2	6
Billiard & Snooker	1	2	3	6
Gymnastic - Artistic	1	2	1	4
Shooting	1	1	0	2
Badminton	1	0	4	5
Wushu	1	0	2	3
Synchronized Swimming	0	3	1	4
Roller Sport	0	1	8	9
Wall Climbing	0	1	7	8
Taekwondo	0	1	4	5
Fencing	0	1	2	3
Cycling	0	1	2	3
Pencak Silat	0	0	3	3
Rowing	0	0	2	2
Open Water Swimming	0	0	1	1
Wrestling	0	0	1	1
Softball	0	0	1	1
Karate-Do	0	0	1	1
Judo	0	0	1	1
Boxing	0	0	1	1
Total	42	45	73	160

Source: SNOC

=== Medals by date ===
Daily: Overall Medals
Day	Date	Gold medal	Silver medal	Bronze medal	Total
Day 1	11th	0	1	2	3
Day 2	12th	8	7	8	23
Day 3	13th	5	4	9	18
Day 4	14th	8	6	13	27
Day 5	15th	4	8	9	21
Day 6	16th	5	7	7	19
Day 7	17th	2	3	6	15
Day 8	18th	1	2	6	9
Day 9	19th	4	6	15	25
Day 10	20th	6	3	7	13
Day 11	21st	1	2	2	5
Day 12	22nd	0	0	0	0
