= Waterskiing at the 2011 SEA Games =

Water skiing event was held at the 26th Southeast Asian Games.

== Medal summary ==
=== Men ===
Event	Gold	Silver	Bronze
Jumping	Muhammad Zahidi; Indonesia	Alex Yoong; Malaysia	Ade Hermana; Indonesia
Slalom	Fath Daud Wangka; Indonesia	Alex Yoong; Malaysia	Indra Hardinata; Indonesia
Trick	Andri Muhamad Febiandi; Indonesia	Norman Rahadi; Indonesia	Padiwat Jaemjan; Thailand
Wakeboard	Padiwat Jaemjan; Thailand	Bunyalo Jumruang; Thailand	Christian Matthew Kheng; Singapore
Overall	Alex Yoong; Malaysia	Muhammad Zahidi; Indonesia	Fajar Eka Samudra; Indonesia

=== Women ===
Event	Gold	Silver	Bronze
Jumping	Endhar Pupul Giritya; Indonesia	Phillipa Clare; Malaysia	Ostra Ligwina; Indonesia
Slalom	Phillipa Clare; Malaysia	Christian Sasha Siew Hoon; Singapore	Ummu Thoyibathus Sholika; Indonesia
Trick	Aaliyah Yoong; Malaysia	Sareeya Promsuntisit; Thailand	Phillipa Clare; Malaysia
Wakeboard	Christian Sasha Siew Hoon; Singapore	Kee Kalya; Singapore	Maria Samantha Meily; Philippines
Overall	Yoong Bayly Phillipa; Malaysia	Endhar Pupul Giritya; Indonesia	Christian Sasha Siew Hoon; Singapore
