= Gymnastics at the 2011 SEA Games =

Gymnastics at the 2011 Southeast Asian Games
- Venue: Dempo Hall
- Location: Palembang, Indonesia

Gymnastics at the 2011 SEA Games was divided into three sub-categories: artistic gymnastics, rhythmic gymnastics, and aerobics. Artistic and Rhythmic Gymnastics were held at the Ranau Gymnastic Hall while Aerobics were held at the Dempo Hall, Palembang, Indonesia.

== Medal winners ==
=== Artistic ===
Men

Event	Gold		Silver		Bronze	
Team all-around	Vietnam; Trương Minh Sang; Nguyễn Hà Thanh; Phạm Phước Hưng; Nguyễn Tuấn Đạt; Hoàng Cường; Đặng Nam	339.250	Thailand; Suriyen Chanduang; Kittipong Yudee; Weena Chokpaoumpai; Thitipong Sukdee; Woranad Kaewpanya; Rartchawat Kaewpanya	335.150	Indonesia; Muhammad Try Saputra; Audi Ashari Arif; Endriadi; Ronny Sabputra; Agus Adi Prayoko; Ferrous One Willyodac	329.700
Individual all-around	Rartchawat Kaewpanya; Thailand	87.400	Phạm Phước Hưng; Vietnam	85.500	Hoàng Cường; Vietnam	84.550
Floor	Hoàng Cường; Vietnam	14.675	shared gold	N/A	Ferrous One Willyodac; Indonesia	14.650
Floor	Rartchawat Kaewpanya; Thailand	14.675	shared gold	N/A	Ferrous One Willyodac; Indonesia	14.650
Horizontal bar	Muhammad Try Saputra; Indonesia	14.200	shared gold	N/A	Ferrous One Willyodac; Indonesia	13.775
Horizontal bar	Phạm Phước Hưng; Vietnam	14.200	shared gold	N/A	Ferrous One Willyodac; Indonesia	13.775
Parallel bars	Nguyễn Hà Thanh; Vietnam	15.500	Phạm Phước Hưng; Vietnam	15.375	Rartchawat Kaewpanya; Thailand	14.450
Pommel horse	Rartchawat Kaewpanya; Thailand	14.825	Gabriel Gan Zi Jie; Singapore	14.350	Trương Minh Sang; Vietnam	14.100
Rings	Đặng Nam; Vietnam	15.050	Phạm Phước Hưng; Vietnam	14.975	Endriadi; Indonesia	14.250
Vault	Nguyễn Tuấn Đạt; Vietnam	15.925	Ronny Sabputra; Indonesia	15.915	Nguyễn Hà Thanh; Vietnam	15.775

Women

Event	Gold		Silver		Bronze	
Team all-around	Singapore; Foo En Ning; Rachel Giam Pei Shi; Krystal Khoo Oon Hui; Nur Atikah Nabilah; Joey Tam Jing Ying; Lim Heem Wei	189.002	Thailand; Lapas Narongnu; Romteera Amod; Mananchaya Senklang; Ajaree Tansub; Rawiwarn Muktanod	183.401	Indonesia; Marissa Deli; Nefy Nurbaeti; Iim Imaroh Fachrudin; Dewi Prahara; Dewi Mustika Marni; Beby Pelany Pravity	182.703
Individual all-around	Phan Thị Hà Thanh; Vietnam	53.217	Đỗ Thị Ngân Thương; Vietnam	49.700	Lim Heem Wei; Singapore	49.484
Balance beam	Đỗ Thị Ngân Thương; Vietnam	12.300	Nur Eli Ellina; Malaysia	12.075	Phan Thị Hà Thanh; Vietnam	12.050
Floor	Phan Thị Hà Thanh; Vietnam	13.125	Lim Heem Wei; Singapore	12.875	Rawiwarn Muktanod; Thailand	12.500
Uneven bars	Đỗ Thị Ngân Thương; Vietnam	12.900	Farah Ann Abdul Hadi; Malaysia	12.375	Nefy Nurbaeti; Indonesia	12.175
Vault	Phan Thị Hà Thanh; Vietnam	14.212	Dewi Prahara; Indonesia	13.125	Mananchaya Senklang; Thailand	12.975

=== Rhythmic ===
Women

Event	Gold		Silver		Bronze	
Individual all-around	Tharatip Sridee; Thailand	113.406	Anyavarin Supateeralert; Thailand	96.515	Dinda Defriana; Indonesia	93.532
Hoop	Tharatip Sridee; Thailand	26.425	Anyavarin Supateeralert; Thailand	25.235	Maria Victoria Alicia Recinto; Philippines	25.105
Ball	Maria Victoria Alicia Recinto; Philippines	28.250	Tharatip Sridee; Thailand	26.450	Dinda Defriana; Indonesia	26.320
Ribbon	Maria Victoria Alicia Recinto; Philippines	24.000	Anyavarin Supateeralert; Thailand	22.950	Dinda Defriana; Indonesia	21.350
Rope	Maria Victoria Alicia Recinto; Philippines	27.990	Anyavarin Supateeralert; Thailand	27.335	Tharatip Sridee; Thailand	27.300

=== Aerobic ===
Event	Gold		Silver		Bronze	
Men's aerobic	Nattawut Pimpa; Thailand	20.300	Vũ Bá Đông; Vietnam	20.250	Phairach Thotkhamchai; Thailand	19.750
Mixed trios	Vietnam; Nguyễn Thiện Phương; Vũ Bá Đông; Trần Thị Thu Hà	20.792	Thailand; Phairach Thotkhamchai; Nattawut Pimpa; Roypim Ngampeerapong	20.584	Indonesia; Faizal Amirullah; Lody Lontoh; Tyana Dewi Koesumawati	19.324

== Medal table ==
* Host nation (Indonesia)

Rank	Nation	Gold	Silver	Bronze	Total
1	Vietnam	12	5	4	21
2	Thailand	5	8	5	18
3	Philippines	3	0	1	4
4	Indonesia*	1	2	11	14
5	Singapore	1	2	1	4
6	Malaysia	0	2	0	2
Totals (6 entries)		22	19	22	63
