= Softball at the 2011 SEA Games =

- Venue: Jakabaring Sport Complex
- Dates: November 2011
- Nations: 4

Softball at the 2011 Southeast Asian Games was held at the Jakabaring Sport Complex, Palembang, Indonesia.

== Men's tournament ==
=== Preliminary round ===
Team	Pld	W	L	GF	GA	GD	Pts
Indonesia	3	3	0	22	2	+20	6
Philippines	3	2	1	22	5	+17	5
Singapore	3	1	2	13	19	−6	4
Malaysia	3	0	3	1	32	−31	3

Date	Time		Score	
12 Nov	09:00	Indonesia	4-2	Philippines
12 Nov	17:15	Singapore	12-1	Malaysia
13 Nov	15:00	Philippines	11-1	Singapore
13 Nov	17:15	Indonesia	11-0	Malaysia
14 Nov	11:15	Indonesia	7-0	Singapore
14 Nov	17:15	Philippines	9-0	Malaysia

=== Knockout round ===
Semifinals
1	Indonesia	1
2	Philippines	2
3	Singapore	11
4	Malaysia	0

Bronze Medal Game
1	Indonesia	9
3	Singapore	2

Final
2	Philippines	7
1	Indonesia	3

=== Medalists ===
Event	Gold	Silver	Bronze
Men	Philippines (PHI); Acuna Florante Rebollos; Christian Paul Oira de Leon; Dario Bacarisas; Edmer Rudal Del Socorro; Emerson Atilano; Isidro Abello; Jasper Cabrera; Jerome Bacarisas; Leo Barredo; Opolonio Rosales; Orlando Constantino Binarao; Oscar Regalado Bradshaw IV; Romeo Bumagat; Victorio Enriquez	Indonesia (INA); Adnan Putra Djani; Muhammad Ahsya Darwis; Andospa Aldo Saputra; Bambang Rahmat Dwitama; Devi Permana; Daru Sudrajat Sumanjaya; Fricharda Oestabima; Gunawan Pramono; Heri Haeruman; Iid Achmad Munadi; Jajat Darajat Kusupiah Negara; Michael Trisnadi; Otto Wahyu Minarto; Rizki Ramadhan; Rizky Aditya; Teuku Ridwan; Toni Pribadi Jaya Putra	Singapore (SIN); Chua Hui Fu; Collin Toh Boon Han; Ganesan So Ramasamy; Ivan Phua Chang Sheng; Kenny Goh Keng Ngee; Li Yekai Gabriel; Liew Kuang Ho; Lim Jun Cheng; Muhammad Farhan Harahap; Ng Cheong Yong; Ng Ee Han Ivan; Ngiam Jun Jie; Senthil Dayalan; Sim Kiang Kai Leonard; Tan Jing Wen Keefe; Tan Yi Rui

== Women's tournament ==
=== Preliminary round ===
Team	Pld	W	L	GF	GA	GD	Pts
Philippines	4	4	0	36	1	+35	8
Indonesia	4	3	1	25	16	+9	7
Singapore	4	2	2	14	17	−3	6
Thailand	4	1	3	16	29	−13	5
Malaysia	4	0	4	9	37	−26	4

Date	Time		Score	
12 Nov	11:15	Philippines	10-1	Thailand
12 Nov	15:00	Indonesia	6-4	Singapore
13 Nov	09:00	Singapore	4-1	Malaysia
13 Nov	11:15	Indonesia	7-3	Thailand
14 Nov	09:00	Philippines	7-0	Singapore
14 Nov	15:00	Indonesia	12-2	Malaysia
15 Nov	09:00	Thailand	9-6	Malaysia
15 Nov	11:15	Indonesia	0-7	Philippines
15 Nov	15:00	Thailand	3-6	Singapore
15 Nov	17:15	Philippines	12-0	Malaysia

=== Knockout round ===
Semifinals
1	Philippines	5
2	Indonesia	1
3	Singapore	3
4	Thailand	4

Bronze Medal Game
2	Indonesia	0
4	Thailand	3

Final
1	Philippines	6
4	Thailand	0

=== Medalists ===
Event	Gold	Silver	Bronze
Women	Philippines (PHI); Angelique Benjamin; Annalie Tabiano Benjamen; Cindy Carol L. Banay; Dela Cruz Marissa; Elvie Entrina; Gina Bacus; Luzviminda Dela Torre Embudo; Marlyn Francisco; Melanie Laserna; Queeny Sabobo; Rizza Bernardino; Sarah Jane Moya Agravante; Veronica Belleza	Thailand (THA); Chompoonut Klongseema; Kantrakorn Jittsaree; Parima Phandakiri; Pariyakorn Paoklang; Paweena Sangkong; Phasinee Mantalampha; Pinit Lee-Udom; Sasithorn Wilairak; Sutunya Yimpaiboon; Tanyaporn Rujihan; Tawanporn Piriyayota; Thanapan Saisud; Wannaporn Punjaroen; Waranya Buaphan; Waraporn Konyuen	Indonesia (INA); Arvie Amanda Lubis; Bunga Mauliddya; Carrin Garimurti; Christin Korason Marini; Dina Permatasari; Estrella Marchia Insamodra; Fitra Khaerunnisa; Herna Megawati; Jessica Ratri Suryoputri; Mutiara; Puri Indraswari; R. Ghassani Alamanda; Radhiana Iskandar; Rebecca Wulankayes Jocom; Santhy Lets Agusta; Tini Chriccentia Mahuse; Yuka Ramadina

Preceded by 2007	Softball at the Southeast Asian Games; 2011 Southeast Asian Games	Succeeded by 2013
