= Wrestling at the 2011 SEA Games =

Wrestling at the 26th SEA Games was held in Palembang, Indonesia.

== Medal table ==
* Host nation (Indonesia)

Rank	Nation	Gold	Silver	Bronze	Total
1	Vietnam	8	4	1	13
2	Indonesia*	4	4	5	13
3	Thailand	3	5	4	12
4	Philippines	2	3	3	8
5	Cambodia	0	0	5	5
6	Laos	0	0	2	2
7	Singapore	0	0	1	1
Totals (7 entries)		17	16	21	54

== Medal summary ==
=== Men's Greco-Roman ===
Event	Gold	Silver	Bronze
50 kg	Moonemee Phongsatorn; Thailand	Ardiansyah; Indonesia	Chab Linh; Cambodia
55 kg	Margarito Angana; Philippines	Đồng Văn Biên; Vietnam	Arbainsyah; Indonesia
60 kg	Muhammad Aliyansyah; Indonesia	Tạ Ngọc Tấn; Vietnam	Nuth Sophol; Cambodia
66 kg	Rustang; Indonesia	Trần Văn Tưởng; Vietnam	Sutep Oomchompoo; Thailand
74 kg	Khổng Văn Khoa; Vietnam	Michael Baletin; Philippines	Kusno Hadi Saputra; Indonesia
74 kg	Khổng Văn Khoa; Vietnam	Michael Baletin; Philippines	Atthaphol Sirithahan; Thailand
84 kg	Jason Balabal; Philippines	Chinnawet Kanchallee; Thailand	Khon Keo Thatthavong; Laos
120 kg	Nguyễn Văn Đức; Vietnam	Robertson Torres; Philippines	Chum Chivinn; Cambodia

=== Men's freestyle ===
Event	Gold	Silver	Bronze
55 kg	Muhammad Iqbal; Indonesia	Kritsada Benmat; Thailand	Paulo De Los Santos; Philippines
60 kg	Nguyễn Huy Hà; Vietnam	Saensung Chatchai; Thailand	M. Ricky Fajar; Indonesia
66 kg	Nguyễn Thế Anh; Vietnam	Roque Mana-ay; Philippines	Aaron Koh Sheng Min; Singapore
66 kg	Nguyễn Thế Anh; Vietnam	Roque Mana-ay; Philippines	Phonkam Sengbolibun; Laos
74 kg	Bùi Tuấn Anh; Vietnam	Ardiansyah Darmansyah; Indonesia	Jimmy Angana; Philippines
84 kg	Cấn Tất Dự; Vietnam	Fahriansyah; Indonesia	Wanna Sitthai; Thailand
96 kg	Methee Tepakam; Thailand	Rudi Armanto; Indonesia	Jason Balabal; Philippines
120 kg	Hà Văn Hiếu; Vietnam	Puris Kaewkoed; Thailand	Chum Chivinn; Cambodia

=== Women's freestyle ===
Event	Gold	Silver	Bronze
55 kg	Trần Thị Diệu Linh; Vietnam	Darunee Ora-in; Thailand	Sulis Yuliani; Indonesia
59 kg	Wilaiwan Thongkam; Thailand	Dương Thị Lan; Vietnam	Eka Setiawati; Indonesia
63 kg	Ridha Wahdaniyaty Ridwan; Indonesia	Lương Thị Quyên; Vietnam	Prapatrida Juajan; Thailand
