= Rowing at the 2011 SEA Games =

Rowing at the 2011 SEA Games was held at Lake Cipule, Karawang, West Java, Indonesia.

== Medal summary ==
=== Medal table ===
* Host nation (Indonesia)

Rank	Nation	Gold	Silver	Bronze	Total
1	Vietnam	3	4	2	9
2	Thailand	3	3	3	9
3	Indonesia*	3	1	1	5
4	Myanmar	1	2	1	4
5	Philippines	1	1	1	3
6	Singapore	0	0	2	2
7	Malaysia	0	0	1	1
Totals (7 entries)		11	11	11	33

=== Medalists ===
==== Men ====
Event	Gold	Silver	Bronze
Single sculls	Nestor Ison Cordova; Philippines	Chaichana Thakum; Thailand	Aung Ko Min; Myanmar
Double sculls	Thailand; Chaichana Thakum; Ruthtanaphol Theppibal	Philippines; Benjamin Tolentino; Rodriguez Jose Turingan	Vietnam; Lương Đức Toàn; Nguyễn Phương Đông
Coxless pair	Vietnam; Đường Thanh Bình; Nguyễn Đình Huy	Myanmar; Saw Wai Hlam; Myint San	Malaysia; Ahmad Huzaifah; Muhammad Aliff Abd Halid
Coxed eight	Indonesia; Iswandi; Jarudin; Mochamad Ali Darta Lakiki; Ramdan Deny Prakasa; Thomas Hallatu; Agus Budi Aji; Ketut Sukasna; Jamaluddin; Ihram	Vietnam; Nguyễn Thế Phòng; Đường Thanh Bình; Nguyễn Đình Huy; Nguyễn Văn Sơn; Nguyễn Văn Nguyên; Trần Đăng Dũng; Vũ Đình Quyền; Lương Đức Toàn; Nguyễn Văn Linh	Thailand; Anon Malun; Methasit Phromphoe; Pongsakorn Phoomsakon; Somporn Mueangkhot; Nopphadol Sangthuang; Leam Kangnok; Tawee Khaenwongkham; Pongsakorn Poomkaew; Pittaya Meebun
Lightweight double sculls	Thailand; Ruthtanaphol Theppibal; Leam Kangnok	Indonesia; Ihram; Jamaluddin	Philippines; Edgar Recana Ilas; Amposta Alvin Lopez
Lightweight coxless four	Indonesia; Muhad Yakin; Ihram; Mochamad Ali Darta Lakiki; Agus Budi Aji	Vietnam; Nguyễn Thế Phòng; Nguyễn Văn Sơn; Vũ Đình Quyền; Trần Đăng Dũng	Thailand; Leam Kangnok; Porntawat Inlee; Channarong Pholkaew; Sajja Heamhern

==== Women ====
Event	Gold	Silver	Bronze
Single sculls	Phuttharaksa Neegree; Thailand	Phạm Thị Huệ; Vietnam	Saiyidah Aisyah; Singapore
Coxless pair	Vietnam; Phạm Thị Thảo; Trần Thị Sâm	Myanmar; Than Than Nwe; Shwe Zin Latt	Singapore; Saiyidah Aisyah; Joanna Chan Lai Cheng
Coxless four	Vietnam; Phạm Thị Huệ; Trần Thị Sâm; Phạm Thị Hài; Phạm Thị Thảo	Thailand; Phuttharaksa Neegree; Bussayamas Phaengkathok; Parinyaphorn Rerkdee; Urailak Rongsak	Indonesia; Wahyuni; Sitti Hasnah; Julianti; Wa Ode Fitri Rahmanjani
Lightweight double sculls	Myanmar; Than Than Nwe; Shwe Zin Latt	Thailand; Bussayamas Phaengkathok; Phuttharaksa Neegree	Vietnam; Nguyễn Thị Hữu; Phạm Thị Hài
Lightweight coxless four	Indonesia; Ratna; Femy Batuwael; Sri Rahayu Masi; Yayah Rokayah	Vietnam; Nguyễn Thị Hồng; Hoàng Thị Phượng; Lê Thị An; Bùi Thị Nhất	Thailand; Varaporn Monchai; Nichakul Nukooltham; Kanya Tachuenchit; Photchani Phutmuen

== Results ==
=== Single Sculls ===
==== Heats ====
November 14

Rank	Athlete	Time
Heat 1
1	Chaichana Thakum (THA)	7:35.510
2	Yeong Wai Mun (SIN)	7:58.910
3	Aung Ko Min (MYA)	8:05.610
4	Mazlie (MAS)	8:06.770
Heat 2
1	Nextor Ison Cordov (PHI)	7:41.900
2	Anang Mulyana (INA)	7:54.490
3	Luong Duc Toan (VIE)	8:24.390

==== Repechages ====
November 14

Rank	Athlete	Time
1	Aung Ko Min (MYA)	8:13.420
2	Yeong Wai Mun (SIN)	8:19.920
3	Anang Mulyana (INA)	8:24.710
4	Mazlie (MAS)	8:48.140
5	Luong Duc Toan (VIE)	9:09.670

==== Finals ====
November 16

Rank	Athlete	Time
1st place, gold medalist(s)		
2nd place, silver medalist(s)		
3rd place, bronze medalist(s)		
4		

==== Coxless pairs ====
===== Heats =====
November 14

Rank	Athlete	Time
Heat 1
1	Indonesia (INA)	7:09.220
2	Philippines (PHI)	7:20.650
3	Myanmar (MYA)	7:45.330
4	Malaysia (MAS)	7:48.610
Heat 2
1	Thailand (THA)	7:13.940
2	Vietnam (VIE)	7:59.930
3	Singapore (SIN)	8:34.610

===== Repechages =====
November 14

Rank	Athlete	Time
1	Vietnam (VIE)	8:00.420
2	Myanmar (MYA)	8:09.450
3	Philippines (PHI)	8:15.480
4	Singapore (SIN)	8:19.540
5	Malaysia (MAS)	8:29.860

===== Finals =====
November 16

Rank	Athlete	Time
1st place, gold medalist(s)		
2nd place, silver medalist(s)		
3rd place, bronze medalist(s)		
4		

==== Lightweight coxless four ====
===== Heats =====
November 14

Rank	Athlete	Time
Heat 1
1	Indonesia (INA)	6:28.950
2	Vietnam (VIE)	6:32.200
3	Malaysia (MAS)	6:45.880
4	Myanmar (MYA)	6:54.700
5	Thailand (THA)	6:56.510

===== Finals =====
November 16

Rank	Athlete	Time
1st place, gold medalist(s)		
2nd place, silver medalist(s)		
3rd place, bronze medalist(s)		
4		

=== Women ===
==== Quadruple sculls ====
===== Heats =====
November 14

Rank	Athlete	Time
Heat 1
1	Vietnam (VIE)	6:57.850
2	Thailand (THA)	7:11.030
3	Indonesia (INA)	7:17.380
4	Myanmar (MYA)	7:36.150

===== Finals =====
November 16

Rank	Athlete	Time
1st place, gold medalist(s)		
2nd place, silver medalist(s)		
3rd place, bronze medalist(s)		
4		

==== Coxless pairs ====
===== Heats =====
November 14

Rank	Athlete	Time
Heat 1
1	Vietnam (VIE)	8:03.770
2	Indonesia (INA)	8:13.930
3	Myanmar (MYA)	8:14.530
4	Thailand (THA)	8:36.170
5	Malaysia (MAS)	9:01.400
6	Singapore (SIN)	9:11.660

===== Finals =====
November 16

Rank	Athlete	Time
1st place, gold medalist(s)		
2nd place, silver medalist(s)		
3rd place, bronze medalist(s)		
4		
