= Soft tennis at the 2011 SEA Games =

Soft tennis at the 2011 SEA Games was held at Jakabaring Sport Complex, Palembang, Indonesia.

== Medal table ==
* Host nation (Indonesia)

Rank	Nation	Gold	Silver	Bronze	Total
1	Indonesia*	7	2	2	11
2	Thailand	0	4	5	9
3	Philippines	0	1	5	6
4	Laos	0	0	2	2
Totals (4 entries)		7	7	14	28

== Medalists ==
Event	Gold	Silver	Bronze
Men's singles	Prima Simpatiaji; Indonesia	Sorachet Uayporn; Thailand	Hendri Susilo Pramono; Indonesia
Men's singles	Prima Simpatiaji; Indonesia	Sorachet Uayporn; Thailand	Joseph Arcilla; Philippines
Women's singles	Wukirasih Sawondari; Indonesia	Parichart Charoensukployphol; Thailand	Dwi Rahayu Pitri; Indonesia
Women's singles	Wukirasih Sawondari; Indonesia	Parichart Charoensukployphol; Thailand	Thassa Vitayaviroj; Thailand
Men's doubles	Indonesia; Prima Simpatiaji; Edi Kusdaryanto	Thailand; Sorachet Uayporn; Pee Meesuk	Philippines; Joseph Arcilla; Jhomar Arcilla
Men's doubles	Indonesia; Prima Simpatiaji; Edi Kusdaryanto	Thailand; Sorachet Uayporn; Pee Meesuk	Thailand; Sakan Thansiriroj; Worranun Ratthapobkorrapak
Women's doubles	Indonesia; Wukirasih Sawondari; Maya Rosa	Indonesia; Dwi Rahayu Pitri; Michelle Julia Sanger	Philippines; Cheryl Macasera; Deena Rose Cruz
Women's doubles	Indonesia; Wukirasih Sawondari; Maya Rosa	Indonesia; Dwi Rahayu Pitri; Michelle Julia Sanger	Thailand; Sawitree Naree; Nuwee Kerdsomboon
Mixed doubles	Indonesia; Edi Kusdaryanto; Septi Mende	Indonesia; Ferly Montolalu; Maya Rosa	Philippines; Samuel Noguit; Noelle Zoleta
Mixed doubles	Indonesia; Edi Kusdaryanto; Septi Mende	Indonesia; Ferly Montolalu; Maya Rosa	Thailand; Sakan Thansiriroj; Parichart Charoensukployphol
Men's team	Indonesia; Prima Simpatiaji; Ferly Montolalu; Hendri Susilo Pramono; Edi Kusdaryanto; Prihatin	Philippines; Samuel Noguit; Jhomar Arcilla; Joseph Arcilla; Giovanni Pietro Mamawal; Mikoff Manduriao	Laos; Khampaseuth Bounsaath; Vilakhot; Bounthavong Sirisak
Men's team	Indonesia; Prima Simpatiaji; Ferly Montolalu; Hendri Susilo Pramono; Edi Kusdaryanto; Prihatin	Philippines; Samuel Noguit; Jhomar Arcilla; Joseph Arcilla; Giovanni Pietro Mamawal; Mikoff Manduriao	Thailand; Pee Meesuk; Worranun Ratthapobkorrapak; Sakan Thansiriroj; Nathapol Thongthanapat; Sorachet Uayporn
Women's team	Indonesia; Wukirasih Sawondari; Maya Rosa; Dwi Rahayu Pitri; Septi Mende; Michelle Julia Sanger	Thailand; Sawitree Naree; Nuwee Kerdsomboon; Punchanok Khunpitak; Thassa Vitayaviroj; Parichart Charoensukployphol	Laos; Vanvilay Chansavang; Visay Chansavang; Malasone Leungkhamsy
Women's team	Indonesia; Wukirasih Sawondari; Maya Rosa; Dwi Rahayu Pitri; Septi Mende; Michelle Julia Sanger	Thailand; Sawitree Naree; Nuwee Kerdsomboon; Punchanok Khunpitak; Thassa Vitayaviroj; Parichart Charoensukployphol	Philippines; Josephine Paaguyo; Cheryl Macasera; Deena Rose Cruz; Divina Gracia Escala; Noelle Zoleta
