= Billiards and snooker at the 2011 SEA Games =

Billiards and Snooker at the 2011 SEA Games

Billiard and snooker at the 2011 SEA Games are held at Jakabaring Billiard Arena, Palembang.

== Medal table ==
* Host nation (Indonesia)

Rank	Nation	Gold	Silver	Bronze	Total
1	Philippines (PHI)	3	2	4	9
2	Vietnam (VIE)	2	1	5	8
3	Thailand (THA)	2	1	1	4
4	Indonesia (INA)*	1	3	2	6
5	Singapore (SIN)	1	2	3	6
6	Malaysia (MAS)	1	0	1	2
7	Myanmar (MYA)	0	1	4	5
Totals (7 entries)		10	10	20	40

== Medal summary ==
=== Men ===
Event	Gold	Silver	Bronze
Carom 1 cushion singles	Mã Minh Cẩm; Vietnam	Francisco Dela Cruz; Philippines	Nguyễn Thanh Long; Vietnam
Carom 1 cushion singles	Mã Minh Cẩm; Vietnam	Francisco Dela Cruz; Philippines	Efren Reyes; Philippines
Carom 3 cushion singles	Nguyễn Quốc Nguyện; Vietnam	Dương Anh Vũ; Vietnam	Reynaldo Grandea; Philippines
Carom 3 cushion singles	Nguyễn Quốc Nguyện; Vietnam	Dương Anh Vũ; Vietnam	Efren Reyes; Philippines
8 ball pool singles	Dennis Orcollo; Philippines	Ricky Yang; Indonesia	Nguyễn Phương Thảo; Vietnam
8 ball pool singles	Dennis Orcollo; Philippines	Ricky Yang; Indonesia	Muhammad Zulfikri; Indonesia
9 ball pool singles	Ricky Yang; Indonesia	Irsal Nasution; Indonesia	Francisco Mertado; Philippines
9 ball pool singles	Ricky Yang; Indonesia	Irsal Nasution; Indonesia	Do The Kien; Vietnam
English billiard singles	Peter Gilchrist; Singapore	Praprut Chaithanasakun; Thailand	Kyaw Oo; Myanmar
English billiard singles	Peter Gilchrist; Singapore	Praprut Chaithanasakun; Thailand	Nay Thway Oo; Myanmar
English billiard doubles	Thailand; Praprut Chaithanasakun; Thawat Sujaritthurakarn	Myanmar; Kyaw Oo; Nay Thway Oo	Singapore; Peter Gilchrist; Ang Boon Chin
English billiard doubles	Thailand; Praprut Chaithanasakun; Thawat Sujaritthurakarn	Myanmar; Kyaw Oo; Nay Thway Oo	Vietnam; Nguyễn Thanh Bình; Phạm Hoài Nam
Snooker singles	Thepchaiya Un-Nooh; Thailand	Ang Boon Chin; Singapore	Thor Chuan Leong; Malaysia
Snooker singles	Thepchaiya Un-Nooh; Thailand	Ang Boon Chin; Singapore	Win Khaing Min Aye; Myanmar
Snooker doubles	Malaysia; Thor Chuan Leong; Chong Tin Sam	Singapore; Lim Chun Kiat; Ang Boon Chin	Myanmar; Win Khaing Min Aye; Win Ko Ko
Snooker doubles	Malaysia; Thor Chuan Leong; Chong Tin Sam	Singapore; Lim Chun Kiat; Ang Boon Chin	Thailand; Thanawat Tirapongpaiboon; Noppon Saengkham

=== Women ===
Event	Gold	Silver	Bronze
8 ball pool singles	Iris Ranola; Philippines	Amanda Rahayu; Indonesia	Angeline Magdalena Ticoalu; Indonesia
8 ball pool singles	Iris Ranola; Philippines	Amanda Rahayu; Indonesia	Hoe Shu Wah; Singapore
9 ball pool singles	Iris Ranola; Philippines	Rubilen Amit; Philippines	Hoe Shu Wah; Singapore
9 ball pool singles	Iris Ranola; Philippines	Rubilen Amit; Philippines	Huỳnh Thị Ngọc Huyền; Vietnam
