= Bridge at the 2011 SEA Games =

== Medal summary ==
=== Men ===
Event	Gold	Silver	Bronze
Butler	Philippines (PHI); Fransisco Sainz Alquiros; George Sy Soo	Indonesia (INA); Robert Parasian; Taufik Gautama Asbi	Thailand (THA); Kirawat Limsinsopon; Pornthep Leelasa-Nguan
Open pairs	Indonesia (INA); Robert Parasian; Taufik Gautama Asbi	Singapore (SIN); Loo Choon Chou; Poon Hua	Thailand (THA); Terasak Jitngamkusol; Kridsadayut Plengsap
Team	Thailand (THA); Pornthep Leelasa-Nguan; Kirawat Limsinsopon; Kridsadayut Plengsap; Terasak Jitngamkusol	Singapore (SIN); Poon Hua; Fong Kien Hoong; Ng Ting Ji Kelvin; Loo Choon Chou	Indonesia (INA); Octavianus Wohon; Taufik Gautama Asbi; Robert Parasian; Tommy Rogi

=== Women ===
Event	Gold	Silver	Bronze
Butler	Indonesia (INA); Kristina Wahyu Murniati; Suci Amita Dewi	Singapore (SIN); Tan Sock Ngin; Ng Lai Chun	Indonesia (INA); Lusje Olha Bojoh; Joice Grace Tueje
Open pairs	Singapore (SIN); Seet Choon Cheng; Tan Yoke Lan	Thailand (THA); Sunisa Chodchoy; Vallapa Svangsopakul	Indonesia (INA); Conny Eufke Sumampouw; Irne Korengkang
Team	Indonesia (INA); Lusje Olha Bojoh; Joice Grace Tueje; Kristina Wahyu Murniati; Suci Amita Dewi	Singapore (SIN); Lam Ze Ying; Tan Selene; Ng Lai Chun; Tan Yoke Lan	Philippines (PHI); Encontro Mylene Urriquia; Gemma Mariano; Viksi Egan; Rosemarie A. Unson

=== Mixed ===
Event	Gold	Silver	Bronze
Butler	Philippines (PHI); Fransisco Sainz Alquiroz; Gemma Mariano	Philippines (PHI); George Sy Soo; Encontro Mylene Urriquia	Singapore (SIN); Loo Choon Chou; Tan Yoke Lan
Open pairs	Indonesia (INA); Taufik Gautama Asbi; Lusje Olha Bojoh	Singapore (SIN); Loo Choon Chou; Tan Yoke Lan	Singapore (SIN); Ng Ting Ji Kelvin; Lam Ze Ying
Team	Thailand (THA); Somchai Baisamot; Kirawat Limsinsopon; Pavinee Sitthi Charoensawat; Khunying Chodchoy	Philippines (PHI); Fransisco Sainz Alquiroz; Allen L. Tan; Gemma Mariano; Viksi Egan	Singapore (SIN); Poon Hua; Loo Choon Chou; Tan Yoke Lan; Lian Sui Sim

== Medal table ==
* Host nation (Indonesia)

Rank	Nation	Gold	Silver	Bronze	Total
1	Indonesia (INA)*	4	1	3	8
2	Philippines (PHI)	2	2	1	5
3	Thailand (THA)	2	1	2	5
4	Singapore (SIN)	1	5	3	9
Totals (4 entries)		9	9	9	27
