= Judo at the 2011 SEA Games =

Judo competition

== Medal table ==
* Host nation (Indonesia)

Rank	Nation	Gold	Silver	Bronze	Total
1	Thailand (THA)	5	3	6	14
2	Indonesia (INA)*	4	2	7	13
3	Vietnam (VIE)	4	2	5	11
4	Myanmar (MYA)	1	6	2	9
5	Laos (LAO)	1	2	1	4
6	Philippines (PHI)	1	0	6	7
7	Cambodia (CAM)	0	1	0	1
8	Malaysia (MAS)	0	0	2	2
9	Singapore (SIN)	0	0	1	1
Totals (9 entries)		16	16	30	62

== Medalists ==
=== Kata ===
Event	Gold	Silver	Bronze
Nage-no kata	Indonesia; Embun Cahyono; Suliswanto	Laos; Viengvilay Chansy; Chindavon Syvanevilay	Thailand; Pongthep Tumrongluk; Sangob Sasipongpan
Jū-no-kata	Thailand; Pitima Thaweerattanasinp; Chuthathip Bampenboon	Laos; Mayouly Phanouvong; Phonevan Syamphone	Indonesia; Sari Astraviani Basuki; Ita Rahmawati

=== Men's combat ===
Event	Gold	Silver	Bronze
55 kg	Toni Irawan; Indonesia	Khom Ratanakmony; Cambodia	Kap Cin Pau; Myanmar
55 kg	Toni Irawan; Indonesia	Khom Ratanakmony; Cambodia	Huỳnh Nhất Thống; Vietnam
60 kg	Hồ Ngân Giang; Vietnam	Hein Latt Zaw; Myanmar	Budi Hidayat; Indonesia
60 kg	Hồ Ngân Giang; Vietnam	Hein Latt Zaw; Myanmar	Sarawut Petsing; Thailand
66 kg	Peter Taslim; Indonesia	Amornthep Namwiset; Thailand	Lloyd Dennis Catipon; Philippines
66 kg	Peter Taslim; Indonesia	Amornthep Namwiset; Thailand	Nguyễn Đình Lộc; Vietnam
73 kg	Achilleus Ralli; Thailand	Thura Zaw; Myanmar	Gilbert Ramirez; Philippines
73 kg	Achilleus Ralli; Thailand	Thura Zaw; Myanmar	Nguyễn Tuấn Học; Vietnam
81 kg	Tô Hải Long; Vietnam	Yan Naing Soe; Myanmar	John Baylon; Philippines
81 kg	Tô Hải Long; Vietnam	Yan Naing Soe; Myanmar	Watcharin Jampawong; Thailand
90 kg	Horas Manurung; Indonesia	Zin Linn Aung; Myanmar	Mohamed Ezzat; Malaysia
90 kg	Horas Manurung; Indonesia	Zin Linn Aung; Myanmar	Saknarin Kaewpkdee; Thailand
100 kg	Đặng Hào; Vietnam	Teerawat Homklin; Thailand	Sengsouly Manivong; Laos
100 kg	Đặng Hào; Vietnam	Teerawat Homklin; Thailand	Krisna Bayu; Indonesia

=== Women's combat ===
Event	Gold	Silver	Bronze
45 kg	Nancy Quillotes; Philippines	Terry Kusumawardani Susanti; Indonesia	Sel Wee; Myanmar
45 kg	Nancy Quillotes; Philippines	Terry Kusumawardani Susanti; Indonesia	Orn-areeya Konngoen; Thailand
48 kg	Wanwisa Muenjit; Thailand	Văn Ngọc Tú; Vietnam	Dewinda Ariani Trisna; Indonesia
48 kg	Wanwisa Muenjit; Thailand	Văn Ngọc Tú; Vietnam	Helen Dawa; Philippines
52 kg	Phonenaly Sayarath; Laos	Thin Zar Soe; Myanmar	Jenielou Mosqueda; Philippines
52 kg	Phonenaly Sayarath; Laos	Thin Zar Soe; Myanmar	Dương Thị Thanh Minh; Vietnam
57 kg	Om Pongchaliew; Thailand	Ni Kadek Anny Pandini; Indonesia	Ang Xuan Yi; Singapore
57 kg	Om Pongchaliew; Thailand	Ni Kadek Anny Pandini; Indonesia	Hồ Thị Như Vân; Vietnam
63 kg	Bùi Thị Hòa; Vietnam	Orapin Senatham; Thailand	Indah Setiawati; Indonesia
63 kg	Bùi Thị Hòa; Vietnam	Orapin Senatham; Thailand	Nik Norbaizura; Malaysia
70 kg	Surattana Thongsri; Thailand	Thandar Win; Myanmar	Kiyomi Watanabe; Philippines
70 kg	Surattana Thongsri; Thailand	Thandar Win; Myanmar	Desi Yudiyanti; Indonesia
78 kg	Aye Aye Aung; Myanmar	Trần Thúy Duy; Vietnam	Arreewan Chansri; Thailand
78 kg	Aye Aye Aung; Myanmar	Trần Thúy Duy; Vietnam	Ira Purnamasari; Indonesia
