= Boxing at the 2011 SEA Games =

Boxing competitions

== Medal summary ==
=== Men ===
Event	Gold	Silver	Bronze
Light flyweight 49 kg	Kaeo Pongprayoon; Thailand	Huỳnh Ngọc Tân; Vietnam	Denisius Agustinus Hitarihun; Indonesia
Light flyweight 49 kg	Kaeo Pongprayoon; Thailand	Huỳnh Ngọc Tân; Vietnam	Wai Phyo Tun; Myanmar
Flyweight; 52 kg	Julio Bria; Indonesia	Chatchai Butdee; Thailand	Rey Saludar; Philippines
Flyweight; 52 kg	Julio Bria; Indonesia	Chatchai Butdee; Thailand	Htet Aung; Myanmar
Bantamweight; 56 kg	Worapoj Petchkoom; Thailand	Trần Quốc Việt; Vietnam	Kyaw Kyaw Latt; Myanmar
Bantamweight; 56 kg	Worapoj Petchkoom; Thailand	Trần Quốc Việt; Vietnam	Rafly Langi; Indonesia
Lightweight; 60 kg	Charly Suarez; Philippines	Matius Mandiangan; Indonesia	Muhamad Ridhwan Ahmad; Singapore
Lightweight; 60 kg	Charly Suarez; Philippines	Matius Mandiangan; Indonesia	Sailom Adi; Thailand
Light welterweight 64 kg	Dennis Galvan; Philippines	Afdan Bachtila; Indonesia	Svay Ratha; Cambodia
Light welterweight 64 kg	Dennis Galvan; Philippines	Afdan Bachtila; Indonesia	Khir Akyazlan; Malaysia
Welterweight; 69 kg	Apichet Saensit; Thailand	Wai Lin Aung; Myanmar	Trương Đình Hoàng; Vietnam
Welterweight; 69 kg	Apichet Saensit; Thailand	Wai Lin Aung; Myanmar	Elio Jenoveva; Timor-Leste
Middleweight; 75 kg	Alex Tatontos; Indonesia	Muhammad Farkhan; Malaysia	Chhuon Sok Leng; Cambodia
Middleweight; 75 kg	Alex Tatontos; Indonesia	Muhammad Farkhan; Malaysia	Manus Boonjumnong; Thailand
Light heavyweight 81 kg	Lương Văn Toản; Vietnam	Aung Ko Ko; Myanmar	Huot Sam Ath; Cambodia
Light heavyweight 81 kg	Lương Văn Toản; Vietnam	Aung Ko Ko; Myanmar	Mohd Fairus Azwan; Malaysia

=== Women ===
Event	Gold	Silver	Bronze
Pinweight 46 kg	Josie Gabuco; Philippines	Trịnh Thị Diễm Kiều; Vietnam	Phaisavane Nok; Laos
Pinweight 46 kg	Josie Gabuco; Philippines	Trịnh Thị Diễm Kiều; Vietnam	Apriliany Pricilia; Indonesia
Light flyweight 48 kg	Alice Aparri; Philippines	Thet Htar San; Myanmar	Selly Wanimbo; Indonesia
Light flyweight 48 kg	Alice Aparri; Philippines	Thet Htar San; Myanmar	Ai Jim; Malaysia
Flyweight 51 kg	Sopida Satumrum; Thailand	Irene Sasihiang; Indonesia	Nguyễn Thị Tuyết Mai; Vietnam
Flyweight 51 kg	Sopida Satumrum; Thailand	Irene Sasihiang; Indonesia	Songka; Laos
Bantamweight 54 kg	Peamwilai Laopeam; Thailand	Nesthy Petecio; Philippines	Vilayphone Tawane; Laos
Featherweight 57 kg	Tassamalee Thongjan; Thailand	Lưu Hồ Diệp; Vietnam	Welmi Paryama; Indonesia
Featherweight 57 kg	Tassamalee Thongjan; Thailand	Lưu Hồ Diệp; Vietnam	Kyu Kyu Hlaing; Myanmar
Lightweight 60 kg	Sudaporn Seesondee; Thailand	Ngô Thị Chung; Vietnam	-

== Medal table ==
* Host nation (Indonesia)

Rank	Nation	Gold	Silver	Bronze	Total
1	Thailand	7	1	2	10
2	Philippines	4	1	1	6
3	Indonesia*	2	3	5	10
4	Vietnam	1	5	2	8
5	Myanmar	0	3	4	7
6	Malaysia	0	1	3	4
7	Cambodia	0	0	3	3
7	Laos	0	0	3	3
9	Singapore	0	0	1	1
9	Timor-Leste	0	0	1	1
Totals (10 entries)		14	14	25	53
