= Aquatics at the 2011 SEA Games =

Swimming at the 2011 SEA Games

Aquatics at the 2011 SEA Games was held in Jakabaring Aquatic Center, Palembang, Indonesia for Swimming, Diving and Synchronized Swimming, Lumban Tirta Arena for Water Polo and Putri Island for Open Water Swimming.

Swimming at the 2011 SEA Games was held in Palembang, Indonesia from 12 to 17 November 2011. The competition featured 38 events (19 male, 19 female) swum in a long course (50m) pool. This was the first games to be held since non-textile swimsuits were banned in January 2010.

Women's water polo made its SEA Games debut in the 26th edition of the sporting event. Indonesia, Malaysia, and Singapore were the only teams to compete after the Philippines and Thailand withdrew.

== Swimming ==
=== Men's events ===
Event	Gold		Silver		Bronze	
50 m freestyle	Arren Quek; Singapore	23.28	Triady Fauzi Sidiq; Indonesia	23.32	Russell Ong; Singapore	23.33
100 m freestyle	Hoàng Quý Phước; Vietnam	50.79	Danny Yeo; Singapore	50.98	Triady Fauzi Sidiq; Indonesia	51.36
200 m freestyle	Danny Yeo; Singapore	1:51.07	Jessie Lacuna; Philippines	1:52.23	Jeremy Kevin Mathews; Singapore	1:52.36
400 m freestyle	Kevin Yeap; Malaysia	3:55.07	Sarit Tiewong; Thailand	3:55.95	Jeremy Kevin Mathews; Singapore	3:58.48
1500 m freestyle	Teo Zhen Ren; Singapore	15:44.32	Kevin Yeap; Malaysia	15:53.79	Ryan Arabejo; Philippines	16:01.26
50 m backstroke	I Gede Siman Sudartawa; Indonesia	25.62; GR	Glenn Victor Sutanto; Indonesia	26.02	Quah Zheng Wen; Singapore	26.38
100 m backstroke	I Gede Siman Sudartawa; Indonesia	55.59; GR	Glenn Victor Sutanto; Indonesia	56.52	Zach Ong; Singapore	56.96
200 m backstroke	I Gede Siman Sudartawa; Indonesia	2:02.44	Zach Ong; Singapore	2:03.06	Rainer Ng; Singapore	2:05.15
50 m breaststroke	Indra Gunawan; Indonesia	28.25; GR	Ng Jia Hao; Singapore	28.66	Nicko Biondi Ricardo; Indonesia	28.85
100 m breaststroke	Nuttapong Ketin; Thailand	1:02.01	Radomyos Matjiur; Thailand	1:02.30	Indra Gunawan; Indonesia	1:02.84
200 m breaststroke	Nuttapong Ketin; Thailand	2:12.99; GR	Indra Gunawan; Indonesia	2:16.95	Idham Dasuki; Indonesia	2:17.45
50 m butterfly	Joseph Schooling; Singapore	24.06; GR	Glenn Victor Sutanto; Indonesia	24.20	Hoàng Quý Phước; Vietnam	24.66
100 m butterfly	Hoàng Quý Phước; Vietnam	53.07; GR	Glenn Victor Sutanto; Indonesia	53.17	Joseph Schooling; Singapore	53.18
200 m butterfly	Joseph Schooling; Singapore	1:56.67; GR	Quah Zheng Wen; Singapore	2:00.24	Arkom Anuchit-O-Larn; Thailand	2:01.44
200 m individual medley	Nuttapong Ketin; Thailand	2:02.90; GR	Joseph Schooling; Singapore	2:04.85	Ian James Barr; Malaysia	2:06.96
400 m individual medley	Quah Zheng Wen; Singapore	4:24.33	Jeremy Kevin Mathews; Singapore	4:27.41	Muhammad Akbar Nasution; Indonesia	4:31.27
4 × 100 m freestyle relay	Singapore; Clement Lim (50.68); Russell Ong (51.28); Arren Quek (50.63); Danny Yeo (50.76)	3:23.35	Indonesia; Triady Fauzi Sidiq (51.45); Alexis Wijaya Ohmar (52.00); Brian Howard Ho (52.10); Guntur Pratama Putra (51.20)	3:26.75	Philippines; Charles Walker (51.96); Jessie Lacuna (51.52); Dhill Anderson Lee (53.31); Kendrick Uy (51.16)	3:27.95
4 × 200 m freestyle relay	Singapore; Jeremy Kevin Mathews (1:53.38); Clement Lim (1:51.55); Teo Zhen Ren (1:53.34); Danny Yeo (1:53.71)	7:31.98	Malaysia; Foo Jian Beng (1:56.27); Kevin Yeap (1:52.02); Vernon Lee (1:55.22); Lim Ching Hwang (1:52.48)	7:35.99	Philippines; Jessie Lacuna (1:53.82); Jose Gonzales (1:55.28); Ryan Arabejo (1:54.93); Charles Walker (1:52.90)	7:36.93
4 × 100 m medley relay	Indonesia; I Gede Siman Sudartawa (55.72); Indra Gunawan (1:02.83); Glenn Victor Sutanto (51.96); Triady Fauzi Sidiq (50.84)	3:41.35; GR	Thailand; Kasipat Chogratin (59.77); Nutapong Kettin (1:02.13); Arkom Anuchit-O-Larn (56.19); Sarit Tiewong (50.73)	3:48.82	Malaysia; Ian James Barr (58.81); Yap See Tuan (1:03.85); Tern Jian Han (57.18); Foo Jian Beng (51.81)	3:51.65

=== Women's events ===
Event	Gold		Silver		Bronze	
50 m freestyle	Amanda Lim; Singapore	25.77; GR	Mylene Ong; Singapore	25.89	Enny Susilawati; Indonesia	26.23
100 m freestyle	Natthanan Junkrajang; Thailand	56.54	Mylene Ong; Singapore	56.71	Amanda Lim; Singapore	56.73
200 m freestyle	Natthanan Junkrajang; Thailand	2:01.49	Amanda Lim; Singapore	2:03.02	Koh Hui Yu; Singapore	2:03.47
400 m freestyle	Natthanan Junkrajang; Thailand	4:15.84	Khoo Cai Lin; Malaysia	4:16.54	Koh Hui Yu; Singapore	4:23.00
800 m freestyle	Khoo Cai Lin; Malaysia	8:50.17	Natthanan Junkrajang; Thailand	8:55.51	Raina Saumi Grahana; Indonesia	9:02.81
50 m backstroke	Shana Lim; Singapore	29.37; GR	Chan Kah Yan; Malaysia	29.55	Dorothy Grace Hong; Philippines	29.96
100 m backstroke	Tao Li; Singapore	1:02.11; GR	Nguyễn Thị Ánh Viên; Vietnam	1:03.68	Dorothy Grace Hong; Philippines	1:03.69
200 m backstroke	Yessy Yosaputra; Indonesia	2:15.73; GR	Dorothy Grace Hong; Philippines	2:17.32	Tao Li; Singapore	2:17.72
50 m breaststroke	Christina Loh; Malaysia	32.49; GR	Siow Yi Ting; Malaysia	32.81	Phiangkhwan Pawapotako; Thailand	33.39
100 m breaststroke	Siow Yi Ting; Malaysia	1:10.55	Christina Loh; Malaysia	1:10.57	Chavunnooch Salubluek; Thailand	1:11.69
200 m breaststroke	Siow Yi Ting; Malaysia	2:33.67	Chavunnooch Salubluek; Thailand	2:35.53	Samantha Yeo; Singapore	2:37.12
50 m butterfly	Tao Li; Singapore	26.59; GR	Marellyn Liew; Malaysia	27.63	Mylene Ong; Singapore	27.71
100 m butterfly	Tao Li; Singapore	58.84; GR	Marellyn Liew; Malaysia	1:01.92	Nguyen Thi Kim Tuy; Vietnam	1:01.97
200 m butterfly	Tao Li; Singapore	2:14.27	Raina Saumi Grahana; Indonesia	2:15.43	Patarawadee Kittiya; Thailand	2:15.70
200 m individual medley	Natthanan Junkrajang; Thailand	2:18.75	Siow Yi Ting; Malaysia	2:20.11	Ressa Kania Dewi; Indonesia	2:21.31
400 m individual medley	Natthanan Junkrajang; Thailand	4:50.88; GR	Nguyễn Thị Ánh Viên; Vietnam	4:54.65	Ressa Kania Dewi; Indonesia	4:58.11
4 × 100 m freestyle relay	Singapore; Koh Hui Yu (57.45); Tao Li (56.98); Mylene Ong (56.26); Amanda Lim (57.69)	3:48.38	Thailand; Jessica Leela Hodgson (57.91); Benjaporn Sriphanomthorn (58.42); Jenjira Srisa-Ard (58.33); Natthanan Junkrajang (57.10)	3:51.76	Malaysia; Leung Chii Lin (59.47); Chan Kah Yan (57.33); Siow Yi Ting (58.42); Khoo Cai Lin (58.05)	3:53.27
4 × 200 m freestyle relay	Singapore; Koh Hui Yu (2:02.41); Mylene Ong (2:03.20); Tao Li (2:04.25); Amanda Lim (2:04.02)	8:13.88	Thailand; Jessica Leela Hodgson (2:04.88); Benjaporn Sriphanomthorn (2:06.39); Phiangkhwan Pawapotako (2:06.95); Patarawadee Kittiya (2:09.64)	8:27.86	Indonesia; Enny Susilawati (2:08.04); Patricia Yosita Hapsari (2:07.47); Ressa Kania Dewi (2:08.19); Raina Saumi Grahana (2:08.83)	8:32.53
4 × 100 m medley relay	Singapore; Shana Lim (1:05.08); Samantha Yeo (1:10.45); Tao Li (58.66); Amanda Lim (57.08)	4:11.27	Malaysia; Chan Kah Yan (1:05.40); Christina Loh (1:09.13); Marellyn Liew (1:02.73); Khoo Cai Lin (57.76)	4:15.02	Thailand; Natthanan Junkrajang (1:04.88); Chavunnooch Salubluek (1:11.79); Patarawadee Kittiya (1:01.99); Jenjira Srisa-Ard (57.95)	4:16.61

=== Medal table ===
* Host nation (Indonesia)

Rank	Nation	Gold	Silver	Bronze	Total
1	Singapore	17	9	13	39
2	Thailand	8	7	5	20
3	Indonesia*	6	8	10	24
4	Malaysia	5	10	3	18
5	Vietnam	2	2	2	6
6	Philippines	0	2	5	7
Totals (6 entries)		38	38	38	114

== Diving ==
=== Men ===
Event	Gold		Silver		Bronze	
3 m springboard	Yeoh Ken Nee; Malaysia	458.15	Ahmad Sukron Jamjami; Indonesia	401.85	Ahmad Amsyar Azman; Malaysia	397.30
10 m platform	Bryan Nickson Lomas; Malaysia	500.80	Ooi Tze Liang; Malaysia	445.25	Muhammad Nasrullah; Indonesia	420.85
Synchronized 3 m springboard	Malaysia; Yeoh Ken Nee; Bryan Nickson Lomas	392.31	Philippines; Nino Carog; Jaime Asok	342.99	Indonesia; Andriyan; Ahmad Sukron Jamjami	332.40
Synchronized 10 m platform	Indonesia; Muhammad Nasrullah; Luthfi Niko Abdillah	378.12	Philippines; Jaime Asok; Rexel Fabriga	344.51	Thailand; Theerapat Siriboon; Satit Tommaoros	260.54

=== Women ===
Event	Gold		Silver		Bronze	
3 m springboard	Cheong Jun Hoong; Malaysia	310.70	Ng Yan Yee; Malaysia	290.10	Sari Ambarwati Suprihatin; Indonesia	270.60
10 m platform	Pandelela Rinong; Malaysia	342.90	Kam Ling Kar; Malaysia	260.85	Della Dinarsari Harimurti; Indonesia	250.50
Synchronized 3 m springboard	Malaysia; Leong Mun Yee; Ng Yan Yee	296.10	Indonesia; Dewi Setyaningsih; Maria Natalie Dinda Anasti	250.20	Philippines; Sheila Mae Perez; Ceseil Domenios	243.12
Synchronized 10 m platform	Malaysia; Leong Mun Yee; Traisy Vivien Tukiet	306.66	Indonesia; Sari Ambarwati Suprihatin; Della Dinarsari Harimurti	268.62	Myanmar; Soe Sandar Nyunt; Hay Mar Hnin	155.73

== Water polo ==
Event	Gold	Silver	Bronze
Men	Singapore; Byron Quek; Brandon Chong Wei-Ren; Kelvin Ong Weisheng; Koh Jian Ying; Lim Yao Xiang; Lin Diyan; Lin Diyang; Loh Zhi Zhi; Luo Nan; Marcus Goh; Tan Jwee Ann Paul; Nigel Tay Sin Chao; Eugen Teo Zhen Wei	Philippines; Alamara Dexter Kasim; Alamara Norton K. Biag Dan Paolo De La Cruz; Cruz Sean Bonyea; Kristoffer Roi Collins De La Cruz; Sherwin Anatacio De La Paz; Evangelista Dale Pardo; Evangelista Elcid Esmeralda; Gomez Tani Jr Bascara; Grabador Raphael Evan Alcover; Guiriba Ronald Alejo Maico; Juan Teofilo Antonio Abejo; Tamula Ryan Edward Ongkeko	Indonesia; Baldwin Karmen; Delvin Felliciano; Hendrik Sugianto; Henry Marciano Raditya; Maulana Bayu; Natanael Gunawan; Novendra Deni; Rezza Auditya Putra; Ridjkie Mulia; Silvester Goldberg; Soedirman Prayogo; Yohan; Zuliansyah
Women	Singapore; Adelyn Yew Yan Xiang; Angeline Teo Yi Ling; Chia T-Chien; Jacquline Chow Chuang Shan; Mary Kan Enci; Valerie Loh Huihui; Loke En Yuan; Low Seet Teng; Ong Cheng Jing; Poh Zhining; Shauna Christine Sim Hwei Sian; Lynnette Jane Tan Hui Ying; Tan Su-Lynn	Indonesia; Annisa Nadhilah Utoro; Ariel Dyan Cininta Siwabessy; Ayudya Suidarwanty; Ernawati Imron; Febby Familya Putri; Felicia Tjandra; Hudaidah Kadir; Inez Febrianti Rasyid; Kezzie Ali; Lili Kartini; Melviani Rayina Eka; Nova Rusneri; Siti Balkis	Malaysia; Aileen Lim Zhixiang; Chan Su Jie; Chong Yi Ling; Debbie Ng; Hay Yan Xiang; Lim Shirinnah; Low Jia Yee; Low Sheen Yee; Samantha Keo; Selene Chew; Shirleen Khoo; Woo Yi Wen; Yap Yee Chuin

== Open water swimming ==
Event	Gold		Silver		Bronze	
Men's 5 km	Châu Bá Anh Tư; Vietnam	1:07:02.52	Ricky Anggawijaya; Indonesia	1:09:58.56	Brandon Boon; Singapore	1:10:02.92
Men's 10 km	Châu Bá Anh Tư; Vietnam	2:14:32.94	Ricky Anggawijaya; Indonesia	2:14:41.59	Kevin Yeap; Malaysia	2:15:29.80
Women's 5 km	Heidi Gan; Malaysia	1:11:47.45	Nguyễn Thị Ngọc Bích; Vietnam	1:13:45.03	Yessy Yosaputra; Indonesia	1:15:19.32
Women's 10 km	Heidi Gan; Malaysia	2:20:26.70	Nguyễn Thị Ngọc Yến; Vietnam	2:34:59.61	Yessy Yosaputra; Indonesia	2:38:47.39

== Synchronized swimming ==
Event	Gold		Silver		Bronze	
Duet Technical Routine	Malaysia; Png Hui Chuen; Katrina Ann	76.125	Singapore; Stephanie Chen Mei Qi; Yap Yu Hui	72.750	Indonesia; Sabihisma Arsyi; Adela Amanda Nirmala	71.000
Duet Free Routine	Malaysia; Png Hui Chuen; Katrina Ann	76.051	Singapore; Stephanie Chen Mei Qi; Yap Yu Hui	72.476	Indonesia; Tri Eka Sandiri; Samara Talia Pattiasina	71.563
Team Technical Routine	Malaysia; Emanuelle Mah Thil Ba; Katrina Ann; Lee Yhing Huey; Lee Zhien Huey; Mandy Yeap; Png Hui Chuen; Tan May Mei; Yeo Pei Ling	74.750	Thailand; Arthittaya Kittithanatphum; Chanamon Sangakul; Natchanat Krasachol; Nujarin Tanabutchot; Thanyaluck Puttisiriroj; Thinatta Kanchanakati; Nantaya Polsen; Sumonsinee Anuchachart	70.750	Indonesia; Adela Amanda Nirmala; Claudia Megawati Suyanto; Sabihisma Arsyi; Samara Talia Pattiasina; Sartika Dewi Rachmani; Shanika Andiarti Soepangkat; Tri Eka Sandiri; Dea Vania Putri	70.375
Team Technical Routine	Malaysia; Emanuelle Mah Thil Ba; Katrina Ann; Lee Yhing Huey; Lee Zhien Huey; Mandy Yeap; Png Hui Chuen; Tan May Mei; Yeo Pei Ling	74.750	Thailand; Arthittaya Kittithanatphum; Chanamon Sangakul; Natchanat Krasachol; Nujarin Tanabutchot; Thanyaluck Puttisiriroj; Thinatta Kanchanakati; Nantaya Polsen; Sumonsinee Anuchachart	70.750	Singapore; Geraldine Chew Wei Ling; Elisabeth Tan Si Lynn; Lee Mei Shuang; Mei Shan Krishnan; Tay Aik Ping; Yap Yu Hui; Zhang Hui; Samantha Chen Mei Chuen	70.375
Team Free Routine	Malaysia; Emanuelle Mah Thil Ba; Katrina Ann; Lee Yhing Huey; Lee Zhien Huey; Mandy Yeap; Png Hui Chuen; Tan May Mei; Yeo Pei Ling	75.825	Indonesia; Adela Amanda Nirmala; Claudia Megawati Suyanto; Sabihisma Arsyi; Samara Talia Pattiasina; Sartika Dewi Rachmani; Shanika Andiarti Soepangkat; Tri Eka Sandiri; Dea Vania Putri	73.925	Thailand; Arthittaya Kittithanatphum; Chanamon Sangakul; Natchanat Krasachol; Nujarin Tanabutchot; Thanyaluck Puttisiriroj; Thinatta Kanchanakati; Nantaya Polsen; Sumonsinee Anuchachart	72.113
Team Free Combination	Malaysia; Emanuelle Mah Thil Ba; Gan Zhen Yu; Katrina Ann; Lee Yhing Huey; Lee Zhien Huey; Mandy Yeap; Png Hui Chuen; Tan May Mei; Tasha Jane; Yeo Pei Ling	75.363	Singapore; Stephanie Chen Mei Qi; Samantha Chen Mei Chuen; Geraldine Chew Wei Ling; Elisabeth Tan Si Lynn; Lee Mei Shuang; Mei Shan Krishnan; Priscilla Sung Cui Ying; Tay Aik Ping; Yap Yu; Zhang Hui	73.101	Indonesia; Adela Amanda Nirmala; Claudia Megawati Suyanto; Dea Vania Putri; Putri Yanindha Sari; Sabihisma Arsyi; Sabrina Ayunda Kusuma; Samara Talia Pattiasina; Sartika Dewi Rachmani; Shanika Andiarti Soepangkat; Tri Eka Sandiri	71.713

== Medal table ==
* Host nation (Indonesia)

Rank	Nation	Gold	Silver	Bronze	Total
1	Malaysia (MAS)	19	13	6	38
2	Singapore (SIN)	19	12	15	46
3	Thailand (THA)	8	8	7	23
4	Indonesia (INA)*	7	15	21	43
5	Vietnam (VIE)	4	4	2	10
6	Philippines (PHI)	0	5	6	11
7	Myanmar (MYA)	0	0	1	1
Totals (7 entries)		57	57	58	172
