= Nguyễn Hà Thanh =

Vietnamese artistic gymnast

- Born: 1988 (age 37–38)

Gymnastics career
- Discipline: Men's artistic gymnastics
- Country represented: Vietnam
Medal record
Men's artistic gymnastics
Representing Vietnam
Asian Championships
Silver medal – second place	2012 Putian	Parallel bar
Bronze medal – third place	2012 Putian	Vault
Southeast Asian Games
Gold medal – first place	2007 Thailand	Parallel bars
Gold medal – first place	2011 Indonesia	Team
Gold medal – first place	2011 Indonesia	Parallel bars
Silver medal – second place	2005 Philippines	Rings
Silver medal – second place	2005 Philippines	Parallel bars
Silver medal – second place	2007 Thailand	Team
Bronze medal – third place	2005 Philippines	Team
Bronze medal – third place	2011 Indonesia	Vault
Artistic Gymnastics FIG World Cup
Gold medal – first place	2012 Ostrava	Vault
Gold medal – first place	2013 Cottbus	Parallel bars
Silver medal – second place	2012 Ostrava	Parallel bars
Silver medal – second place	2013 La Roche-sur-Yon	Vault

Nguyễn Hà Thanh (born 1988), is a Vietnamese artistic gymnast from Hanoi. In 2012, he became the first gymnast to win a gold medal for Vietnam at World Challenge Cup, winning on at the 2012 Artistic Gymnastics FIG World Cup in Ostrava, Czech Republic.
