= Chess at the 2011 SEA Games =

Chess at the 2011 Southeast Asian Games
- Venue: Jayakarta Hotel
- Location: Palembang, Indonesia
- Dates: 17–21 November

Chess at the 26th Southeast Asian Games was held at Jayakarta Hotel in Palembang, Indonesia between 17 and 21 November 2011.

== Medal summary ==
=== Men ===
Event	Gold	Silver	Bronze
Asian	Uaychai Kongsee; Thailand	Wynn Zaw Htun; Myanmar	Nguyễn Huỳnh Minh Huy; Vietnam
Blindfold	Lê Quang Liêm; Vietnam	John Paul Gomez; Philippines	Darwin Laylo; Philippines
Standard	Susanto Megaranto; Indonesia	Wesley So; Philippines	Kyaw Lin Naing; Myanmar
Rapid	Lê Quang Liêm; Vietnam	Hamdani Rudin; Indonesia	Nguyễn Ngọc Trường Sơn; Vietnam
Blitz	Wesley So; Philippines	Nguyễn Ngọc Trường Sơn; Vietnam	Mark Paragua; Philippines

=== Women ===
Event	Gold	Silver	Bronze
Standard	Nguyễn Thị Mai Hưng; Vietnam	Rulp Ylem Jose; Philippines	Irine Kharisma Sukandar; Indonesia
Rapid	Phạm Lê Thảo Nguyên; Vietnam	Hoàng Thị Bảo Trâm; Vietnam	Catherine Perena; Philippines
Blitz	Hoàng Thị Như Ý Vietnam	Medina Warda Aulia; Indonesia	Chelsie Monica Ignesias Sihite; Indonesia

=== Mixed ===
Event	Gold	Silver	Bronze
Standard	Vietnam; Đào Thiên Hải; Nguyễn Thị Thanh An	Philippines; Oliver Barbosa; Catherine Perena	Malaysia; Lim Yee-Weng; Nur Najiha Hisham

== Medal table ==
* Host nation (Indonesia)

Rank	Nation	Gold	Silver	Bronze	Total
1	Vietnam (VIE)	6	2	2	10
2	Philippines (PHI)	1	4	3	8
3	Indonesia (INA)*	1	2	2	5
4	Thailand (THA)	1	0	0	1
5	Myanmar (MYA)	0	1	1	2
6	Malaysia (MAS)	0	0	1	1
Totals (6 entries)		9	9	9	27
