= Equestrian at the 2011 SEA Games =

Equestrian at the 2011 Southeast Asian Games was held at Arthayasa Stables and Country Club, Depok, Indonesia.

== Medal summary ==
Event	Gold	Silver	Bronze
Individual jumping	Diego Lorenzo on Grace 292 (PHI)	Toni Leviste on Century Magic (PHI)	Ardi Hapsoro on Zandor (INA)
Team jumping	Indonesia; Andry Prasetyono on 3K Lund Star; Ardi Hapsoro on Zandor; Putri Hamidjojo on La Belle 140; Denis Christian Sanjaya on Pazia Greta	Philippines; Toni Leviste on Century Magic; Diego Lorenzo on Grace 292; Michelle Barrera on Noble Blue; Joker Arroyo on Didi de Goedereede	Malaysia; Sharmini Christina Ratnasingham on Lanssini; Natasha Ines Wah Idris on Wachinta; Muhammad Nabil Fikri Ismail on Urgola; Nurlin Mohd Saleh on Lexis 9
Individual dressage	Larasati Gading on Wallenstein 145 (INA)	Alvaro Menayang on Desperado 172 (INA)	Pakinee Pantapa on Tayutin (THA)
Team dressage	Indonesia; Ferry Wahyu Hadiyanto on Bonita; Djolfi Momongan on Wyatt Earp; Alvaro Menayang on Desperado 172; Larasati Gading on Wallenstein 145	Thailand; Pananya Tradthong on First Point; Nitipat Ngao-Osa on Michelangelo; Suwat Boonlue on Delgado; Pakinee Pantapa on Tayutin	Myanmar; Ei Thet Mon on Wonderland; Than Hlaing on Rualdo; Aung Thu Tun on Groovy
Individual eventing	Promton Kingwan on Val 3 (THA)	Supap Khaw-Ngam on Ardbohill Lad (THA)	Anto Budiarto on Red Star (INA)
Team eventing	Thailand; Namchok Jantakad on Clifton Zengarie; Supap Khaw-Ngam on Ardbohill Lad; Thanaporn Chavatanont on Painter's Peer; Weerapat Pitakanonda on Monarchs Royal Touch	Indonesia; Albert Pelealu on Edo Budiluhur; Anto Budiarto on Red Star; Ardi Hapsoro on Autumn Spirit 2 Pingkan Motira on Star Wicky; Asep Lesmana on Kelecyn Chessa Peak	Myanmar; Aung Thu Tun on Alberto; Myint Thein on Master Starlight; Than Hlaing on Bougenville; Thein Win on Starnose

== Medal table ==
* Host nation (Indonesia)

Rank	Nation	Gold	Silver	Bronze	Total
1	Indonesia (INA)*	3	2	2	7
2	Thailand (THA)	2	2	1	5
3	Philippines (PHI)	1	2	0	3
4	Myanmar (MYA)	0	0	2	2
5	Malaysia (MAS)	0	0	1	1
Totals (5 entries)		6	6	6	18
