= Traditional boat race at the 2011 SEA Games =

Traditional boat race at the 2011 SEA Games was held at Lake Cipule, Karawang, Indonesia.

== Medal table ==
* Host nation (Indonesia)

Rank	Nation	Gold	Silver	Bronze	Total
1	Myanmar	9	1	0	10
2	Philippines	1	2	2	5
3	Indonesia*	0	5	4	9
4	Thailand	0	2	5	7
Totals (4 entries)		10	10	11	31

== Medal summary ==
=== Men ===
Event	Gold	Silver	Bronze
10+1+1 500 m	Myanmar (MYA); Htoo Htoo; Kar Latt; Saw Law Kail; Thaung Win; Win Htut Aung; Zaw Moe Aung; Tun Tun Lin; Zaw Min; Aung Kyaw Moe; Kan Shwe; Saw Satay Phanu; Tun Tun Naing; Myint Zaw; Zaw Zaw	Philippines (PHI); Alex A. Generalo; Benedicto Oreta Zafra; Florence A. Caro; Ric Nacional; Ricky Mirana Sardenas; Rolando D. Isidro; Ambrosio A. Gotinas; Manuel M. Maya; Alex O. Sumagaysay; Diomedes B. Manalo; Ronnel B. Rafael; Joseph O. Magno	Indonesia (INA); Asnawir; Didin Rusdiana; Ikhwan Randi; Jekki; Maizir Riyondro; Ahmad Supriadi; Weri Febriyanto; Sikno Siswanto; Abdul Aziz; Iwan Husin; John Fetter Matule; Erwin David Monim; Spens Stuber Mehue; Dedi Saputra
10+1+1 1000 m	Myanmar (MYA); Htoo Htoo; Kar Latt; Saw Law Kail; Thaung Win; Win Htut Aung; Zaw Moe Aung; Tun Tun Lin; Zaw Min; Aung Kyaw Moe; Kan Shwe; Saw Satay Phanu; Tun Tun Naing; Myint Zaw; Zaw Zaw	Indonesia (INA); Asnawir; Didin Rusdiana; Ikhwan Randi; Jekki; Maizir Riyondro; Ahmad Supriadi; Weri Febriyanto; Sikno Siswanto; Abdul Aziz; Iwan Husin; John Fetter Matule; Erwin David Monim; Spens Stuber Mehue; Dedi Saputra	Philippines (PHI); Alex A. Generalo; Benedicto Oreta Zafra; Florence A. Caro; Ric Nacional; Ricky Mirana Sardenas; Rolando D. Isidro; Ambrosio A. Gotinas; Manuel M. Maya; Alex O. Sumagaysay; Diomedes B. Manalo; Ronnel B. Rafael; Joseph O. Magno
10+1+1 1000 m	Myanmar (MYA); Htoo Htoo; Kar Latt; Saw Law Kail; Thaung Win; Win Htut Aung; Zaw Moe Aung; Tun Tun Lin; Zaw Min; Aung Kyaw Moe; Kan Shwe; Saw Satay Phanu; Tun Tun Naing; Myint Zaw; Zaw Zaw	Indonesia (INA); Asnawir; Didin Rusdiana; Ikhwan Randi; Jekki; Maizir Riyondro; Ahmad Supriadi; Weri Febriyanto; Sikno Siswanto; Abdul Aziz; Iwan Husin; John Fetter Matule; Erwin David Monim; Spens Stuber Mehue; Dedi Saputra	Thailand (THA); Anuchit Promdonkloy; Gunyakorn Tawa; Kritamete Sattanan; Samart Pimharn; Sanchai Chusamrit; Suriya Khankaew; Thaveesak Angkhanee; Wuttikrai Wongupparee; Amnat Pinthong; Chaiyakarn Choochuen; Kongkiad Philason; Nattapon Punsupa; Thotsaporn Pholseth; Vinya Seechomchuen
20+1+1 500 m	Philippines (PHI); Alex A. Generalo; Benedicto Oreta Zafra; Florence A. Caro; Ric Nacional; Ricky Mirana Sardenas; Rolando D. Isidro; Ambrosio A. Gotinas; Manuel M. Maya; Alex O. Sumagaysay; Diomedes B. Manalo; Ronnel B. Rafael; Joseph O. Magno; Dany M. Funela; Edward I. Balbuena; Jameson O. Buhamit; Louie Rodriguez Orias; Nelson I. Cordova; Raquiel P. Espinosa; Leonel P. Imus; Alberto T. Hugo; Alex A. Generalo; Datibo Romares; Edcer C. Penetrante; Hermie M. Macarana; Norwel T. Cajes	Myanmar (MYA); Htoo Htoo; Kar Latt; Saw Law Kail; Thaung Win; Win Htut Aung; Zaw Moe Aung; Tun Tun Lin; Zaw Min; Aung Kyaw Moe; Kan Shwe; Saw Satay Phanu; Tun Tun Naing; Myint Zaw; Zaw Zaw; Kyaw San Aye; Min Min Zaw; Sai Min Aung; Saw Ahal Balu; Zaw Naing Win; Kyaw Soe; Aung Zaw Aye; Kyaw Lin Tun; Zaw Naing; Saw Tha Poe; Ye Kyaw Thu; Kyaw Thu Htwe	Thailand (THA); Anuchit Promdonkloy; Gunyakorn Tawa; Kritamete Sattanan; Samart Pimharn; Sanchai Chusamrit; Suriya Khankaew; Thaveesak Angkhanee; Wuttikrai Wongupparee; Amnat Pinthong; Chaiyakarn Choochuen; Kongkiad Philason; Nattapon Punsupa; Thotsaporn Pholseth; Vinya Seechomchuen; Nutthapong Watcharakornsiri; Paiboon Chanpram; Panyar Panmuad; Thunyaboon Nasok; Manit Haisok; Somsong Suebsingkan; Chayun Tuejaima; Ekkapong Wongunjai; Samruai Vimolphan; Natthawat Samokham; Pairut Injun; Piyapong Wootti
20+1+1 1000 m	Myanmar (MYA); Htoo Htoo; Kar Latt; Saw Law Kail; Thaung Win; Win Htut Aung; Zaw Moe Aung; Tun Tun Lin; Zaw Min; Aung Kyaw Moe; Kan Shwe; Saw Satay Phanu; Tun Tun Naing; Myint Zaw; Zaw Zaw; Kyaw San Aye; Min Min Zaw; Sai Min Aung; Saw Ahal Balu; Zaw Naing Win; Kyaw Soe; Aung Zaw Aye; Kyaw Lin Tun; Zaw Naing; Saw Tha Poe; Ye Kyaw Thu; Kyaw Thu Htwe	Indonesia (INA); Asnawir; Didin Rusdiana; Ikhwan Randi; Jekki; Maizir Riyondro; Ahmad Supriadi; Weri Febriyanto; Sikno Siswanto; Abdul Aziz; Iwan Husin; John Fetter Matule; Erwin David Monim; Spens Stuber Mehue; Dedi Saputra; Jefklin Mehue; Muhammad Ahsan Nur; Asep Hidayat; Eka Octarorianus; Muchlis; Arif Riyadi; Ajurahman; Anwar Tarra; Dedy Kurniawan; Jaslin; Silo; Marjuki	Philippines (PHI); Alex A. Generalo; Benedicto Oreta Zafra; Florence A. Caro; Ric Nacional; Ricky Mirana Sardenas; Rolando D. Isidro; Ambrosio A. Gotinas; Manuel M. Maya; Alex O. Sumagaysay; Diomedes B. Manalo; Ronnel B. Rafael; Joseph O. Magno; Dany M. Funela; Edward I. Balbuena; Jameson O. Buhamit; Louie Rodriguez Orias; Nelson I. Cordova; Raquiel P. Espinosa; Leonel P. Imus; Alberto T. Hugo; Alex A. Generalo; Datibo Romares; Edcer C. Penetrante; Hermie M. Macarana; Norwel T. Cajes
20+1+1 2000 m	Myanmar (MYA); Htoo Htoo; Kar Latt; Saw Law Kail; Thaung Win; Win Htut Aung; Zaw Moe Aung; Tun Tun Lin; Zaw Min; Aung Kyaw Moe; Kan Shwe; Saw Satay Phanu; Tun Tun Naing; Myint Zaw; Zaw Zaw; Kyaw San Aye; Min Min Zaw; Sai Min Aung; Saw Ahal Balu; Zaw Naing Win; Kyaw Soe; Aung Zaw Aye; Kyaw Lin Tun; Zaw Naing; Saw Tha Poe; Ye Kyaw Thu; Kyaw Thu Htwe	Philippines (PHI); Alex A. Generalo; Benedicto Oreta Zafra; Florence A. Caro; Ric Nacional; Ricky Mirana Sardenas; Rolando D. Isidro; Ambrosio A. Gotinas; Manuel M. Maya; Alex O. Sumagaysay; Diomedes B. Manalo; Ronnel B. Rafael; Joseph O. Magno; Dany M. Funela; Edward I. Balbuena; Jameson O. Buhamit; Louie Rodriguez Orias; Nelson I. Cordova; Raquiel P. Espinosa; Leonel P. Imus; Alberto T. Hugo; Alex A. Generalo; Datibo Romares; Edcer C. Penetrante; Hermie M. Macarana; Norwel T. Cajes	Indonesia (INA); Asnawir; Didin Rusdiana; Ikhwan Randi; Jekki; Maizir Riyondro; Ahmad Supriadi; Weri Febriyanto; Sikno Siswanto; Abdul Aziz; Iwan Husin; John Fetter Matule; Erwin David Monim; Spens Stuber Mehue; Dedi Saputra; Jefklin Mehue; Muhammad Ahsan Nur; Asep Hidayat; Eka Octarorianus; Muchlis; Arif Riyadi; Ajurahman; Anwar Tarra; Dedy Kurniawan; Jaslin; Silo; Marjuki

=== Women ===
Event	Gold	Silver	Bronze
10+1+1 500 m	Myanmar (MYA); Hnin Wai Lwin; Myint Myint Moe; Myint Myint Than; Myo Myo Khaing; Nwe War Hlaing; Phyu Thi Oo; Thin Thin Kyu; Cho The; Hay Mar Soe; May Thin Thin Aung; Naw Ahle Lashe; Thet Phyo Naing; Naw Ahkar Moe; Saw Myat Thu	Thailand (THA); Aranya Phuchim; Bussarin Sukkaew; Nattakant Boonruang; Pranchalee Moonkasem; Ravisara Sungsawan; Sirinya Klongjaroen; Nutcharat Chimbanrai; Jariya Kankasikam; Nipaporn Nopsri; Saowanee Khamsaeng; Chutikan Thanawanutpong; Pattaya Sangkumma; Prapaporn Pumkhunthod; Thanaphon Prasoetpan	Indonesia (INA); Astri Dwijayanti; Dayumin; Minawati; Parida; Ririn Nur Paridah; Wahyuni; Masripah; Sarce Aronggear; Kanti Santyawati; Seni Gantiani; Multi; Rasima; Since Lithasova Yom; Yolanda Ester Entong
10+1+1 1000 m	Myanmar (MYA); Hnin Wai Lwin; Myint Myint Moe; Myint Myint Than; Myo Myo Khaing; Nwe War Hlaing; Phyu Thi Oo; Thin Thin Kyu; Cho The; Hay Mar Soe; May Thin Thin Aung; Naw Ahle Lashe; Thet Phyo Naing; Naw Ahkar Moe; Saw Myat Thu	Indonesia (INA); Erni Sokoy; Multi; Suci Rahmayanti; Wina Apriani; Yolanda Ester Entong; Masripah; Rasima; Astri Dwijayanti; Dayumin; Minawati; Suhartati; Sarce Aronggear; Yunita Kadop; Parida	Thailand (THA); Aranya Phuchim; Bussarin Sukkaew; Nattakant Boonruang; Pranchalee Moonkasem; Ravisara Sungsawan; Sirinya Klongjaroen; Nutcharat Chimbanrai; Jariya Kankasikam; Nipaporn Nopsri; Saowanee Khamsaeng; Chutikan Thanawanutpong; Pattaya Sangkumma; Prapaporn Pumkhunthod; Thanaphon Prasoetpan
20+1+1 500 m	Myanmar (MYA); Aye Aye Moe; Hay Mar Soe; Hnin Wai Lwin; May Thin Thin Aung; Myint Myint Than; Naw Ahkar Moe; Naw Wai Wai Lin; Nwe War Hlaing; Phyu Thi Oo; Saw Myat Thu; Thanda Swe; The Phyu; Thida Hnin; Win Win Htwe; Thet Phyo Naing; Naw Ahle Lashe; Thin Thin Kyu; Cho The; San Thida Win; Myint Myint Moe; Myo Myo Khaing; Ngwe Zin Latt; Khing Thazin Htet; Naw Win Mar Soe; Win Pa Pa; Zin Mar Oo	Indonesia (INA); Astri Dwijayanti; Dayumin; Itsnah Tsaniah; Minawati; Nikmah Diana; Parida; Ririn Nur Paridah; Sarce Aronggear; Since Lithasova Yom; Suci Rahmayanti; Wahyuni; Wina Apriani; Yolanda Ester Entong; Marnia; Marnryatiia; Novita Sari; Amelia Nur Cahaya; Seni Gantiani; Yunita Kadop; Kanti Santyawati; Multi; Sapriani; Suhartati; Masripah; Erni Sokoy; Rasima	Thailand (THA); Aranya Phuchim; Bussarin Sukkaew; Jariya Kankasikam; Jirarat Boonyakaset; Nattakant Boonruang; Nipatcha Pootong; Pattaya Sangkumma; Praewpan Kawsri; Pranchalee Moonkasem; Prapaporn Pumkhunthod; Rungpailin Sungsuwan; Sirinya Klongjaroen; Thanaphon Prasoetpan; Pratumrat Nakuy; Ngamfah Photha; Supavadee Pengwang; Jaruwan Chaikan; Kornkaew Chantaniyom; Pemika Metsuwan; Ravisara Sungsawan; Saowanee Khamsaeng; Chutikan Thanawanutpong; Nipaporn Nopsri; Nutcharat Chimbanrai; Tanaporn Panid; Wanida Thammarat
20+1+1 1000 m	Myanmar (MYA); Aye Aye Moe; Hay Mar Soe; Hnin Wai Lwin; May Thin Thin Aung; Myint Myint Than; Naw Ahkar Moe; Naw Wai Wai Lin; Nwe War Hlaing; Phyu Thi Oo; Saw Myat Thu; Thanda Swe; The Phyu; Thida Hnin; Win Win Htwe; Thet Phyo Naing; Naw Ahle Lashe; Thin Thin Kyu; Cho The; San Thida Win; Myint Myint Moe; Myo Myo Khaing; Ngwe Zin Latt; Khing Thazin Htet; Naw Win Mar Soe; Win Pa Pa; Zin Mar Oo	Indonesia (INA); Astri Dwijayanti; Dayumin; Itsnah Tsaniah; Minawati; Nikmah Diana; Parida; Ririn Nur Paridah; Sarce Aronggear; Since Lithasova Yom; Suci Rahmayanti; Wahyuni; Wina Apriani; Yolanda Ester Entong; Marnia; Marnryatiia; Novita Sari; Amelia Nur Cahaya; Seni Gantiani; Yunita Kadop; Kanti Santyawati; Multi; Sapriani; Suhartati; Masripah; Erni Sokoy; Rasima	Thailand (THA); Aranya Phuchim; Bussarin Sukkaew; Jariya Kankasikam; Jirarat Boonyakaset; Nattakant Boonruang; Nipatcha Pootong; Pattaya Sangkumma; Praewpan Kawsri; Pranchalee Moonkasem; Prapaporn Pumkhunthod; Rungpailin Sungsuwan; Sirinya Klongjaroen; Thanaphon Prasoetpan; Pratumrat Nakuy; Ngamfah Photha; Supavadee Pengwang; Jaruwan Chaikan; Kornkaew Chantaniyom; Pemika Metsuwan; Ravisara Sungsawan; Saowanee Khamsaeng; Chutikan Thanawanutpong; Nipaporn Nopsri; Nutcharat Chimbanrai; Tanaporn Panid; Wanida Thammarat
20+1+1 2000 m	Myanmar (MYA); Aye Aye Moe; Hay Mar Soe; Hnin Wai Lwin; May Thin Thin Aung; Myint Myint Than; Naw Ahkar Moe; Naw Wai Wai Lin; Nwe War Hlaing; Phyu Thi Oo; Saw Myat Thu; Thanda Swe; The Phyu; Thida Hnin; Win Win Htwe; Thet Phyo Naing; Naw Ahle Lashe; Thin Thin Kyu; Cho The; San Thida Win; Myint Myint Moe; Myo Myo Khaing; Ngwe Zin Latt; Khing Thazin Htet; Naw Win Mar Soe; Win Pa Pa; Zin Mar Oo	Thailand (THA); Aranya Phuchim; Bussarin Sukkaew; Jariya Kankasikam; Jirarat Boonyakaset; Nattakant Boonruang; Nipatcha Pootong; Pattaya Sangkumma; Praewpan Kawsri; Pranchalee Moonkasem; Prapaporn Pumkhunthod; Rungpailin Sungsuwan; Sirinya Klongjaroen; Thanaphon Prasoetpan; Pratumrat Nakuy; Ngamfah Photha; Supavadee Pengwang; Jaruwan Chaikan; Kornkaew Chantaniyom; Pemika Metsuwan; Ravisara Sungsawan; Saowanee Khamsaeng; Chutikan Thanawanutpong; Nipaporn Nopsri; Nutcharat Chimbanrai; Tanaporn Panid; Wanida Thammarat	Indonesia (INA); Astri Dwijayanti; Dayumin; Itsnah Tsaniah; Minawati; Nikmah Diana; Parida; Ririn Nur Paridah; Sarce Aronggear; Since Lithasova Yom; Suci Rahmayanti; Wahyuni; Wina Apriani; Yolanda Ester Entong; Marnia; Marnryatiia; Novita Sari; Amelia Nur Cahaya; Seni Gantiani; Yunita Kadop; Kanti Santyawati; Multi; Sapriani; Suhartati; Masripah; Erni Sokoy; Rasima
