= Philippines at the 2011 SEA Games =

Philippines at the 2011 Southeast Asian Games
- IOC code: PHI
- NOC: Philippine Olympic Committee
- Website: www.olympic.ph (in English)

in Jakarta and Palembang
- Competitors: 512 in 39 sports
- Flag bearer: Rey Saludar (boxing)
- Officials: 140
- Medals Ranked 6th: Gold 36 Silver 56 Bronze 77 Total 169

Southeast Asian Games appearances (overview)
- 1977; 1979; 1981; 1983; 1985; 1987; 1989; 1991; 1993; 1995; 1997; 1999; 2001; 2003; 2005; 2007; 2009; 2011; 2013; 2015; 2017; 2019; 2021; 2023; 2025; 2027; 2029

This year's Philippine contingent at the 26th Southeast Asian Games consists of 512 athletes and 140 officials which is higher than the proposed contingent. Filipino Athletes will compete in a total of 39 sports events. The games will be held from 11 to 22 November 2011 in Jakarta and Palembang, Indonesia.

== Medalists ==
=== Gold ===
No.	Medal	Name	Sport	Event
1	Gold	Earl Benjamin Jacinto Yap; Delfin Anthony Adriano	Archery	Men's team
2	Gold	Rene Herrera	Athletics	Men's 3000m Steeplechase
3	Gold	Edgardo Alejan; Julius Nierras; Junrey Ocampo Bano; Archand Christian Bagsit	Athletics	Men's 4x400m Relay
4	Gold	Marestella Torres	Athletics	Women's long jump
5	Gold	Alfredo Olivares Jr. Carlos Alberto Munoz; Charlie Labrador; Christian Canlas; Darwin Dela Calzada; Ernesto Binarao; Francis Candela; Fulgencio Rances Jr. Galedo Christian; Jonash Ponce; Jon-Jon Robles; Joseph Orillana; Junnifer Pinero; Marvin Malig; Matt Laurel; Ram Casey Alipio; Roel Empacis; Romeo Jasmin Jr. Rommel Roja; Ruben Angeles; Saxon Omandac; Vladimir Eguia	Baseball	Men's team
6	Gold	Bobby Ray Parks Jr. Chris Ellis; Chris Tiu; Cliff Hodge; Dave Marcelo; Jake Pascual; Emman Monfort; Garvo Lanete; Greg Slaughter; Kiefer Ravena; Nico Salva; RR Garcia	Basketball	Men's team
7	Gold	Dennis Orcollo	Billiards	Men's 8-Ball Pool Singles
8	Gold	Iris Ranola	Billiards	Women's 8-Ball Pool Singles
9	Gold	Iris Ranola	Billiards	Women's 9-Ball Pool Singles
10	Gold	Frederick Ong	Bowling	Men's singles
11	Gold	Charly Suarez	Boxing	Men's Lightweight 60kg
12	Gold	Dennis Galvan	Boxing	Men's Light Welterweight 64kg
13	Gold	Josie Gabuco	Boxing	Women's Pinweight 46kg
14	Gold	Alice Aparri	Boxing	Women's light flyweight 48kg
15	Gold	Francisco Sainz Alquiros; George Sy Soo	Bridge	Men's Butler
16	Gold	Francisco Sainz Alquiros; Gemma Mariano	Bridge	Mixed Butler
17	Gold	Wesley So	Chess	Men's Blitz
18	Gold	Alfie Pajo Catalan	Cycling	Men's Track 4km Individual Pursuit
19	Gold	Mier Lohn Renee	Cycling	Men's Track 40km Points Race
20	Gold	Diego Lorenzo	Equestrian	Individual Jumping
21	Gold	Walbert Mendoza	Fencing	Men's individual Sabre
22	Gold	Danielle Faith San	Fin Swimming	Women's 50m Surface
23	Gold	Ma. Victoria Alicia Recinto	Gymnastics	Women's Rhythmic Ball
24	Gold	Ma. Victoria Alicia Recinto	Gymnastics	Women's Rhythmic Ribbon
25	Gold	Ma. Victoria Alicia Recinto	Gymnastics	Women's Rhythmic Rope
26	Gold	Nancy Quillotes	Judo	Women's Combat 45kg
27	Gold	Nestor Ison Cordova	Rowing	Men's single sculls
28	Gold	Acuna Florante Rebollos; Christian Paul Oira de Leon; Dario Bacarisas; Edmer Rudal Del Socorro; Emerson Atilano; Isidro Abello; Jasper Cabrera; Jerome Bacarisas; Leo Barredo; Opolonio Rosales; Orlando Constantino Binarao; Oscar Regalado Bradshaw IV; Romeo Bumagat; Victorio Enriquez	Softball	Men's team
29	Gold	Angelique Benjamin; Annalie Tabiano Benjamen; Cindy Carol L. Banay; Dela Cruz Marissa; Elvie Entrina; Gina Bacus; Luzviminda Dela Torre Embudo; Marlyn Francisco; Melanie Laserna; Queeny Sabobo; Rizza Bernardino; Sarah Jane Moya Agravante; Veronica Belleza	Softball	Women's team
30	Gold	Rani Ann Ortega; Francesca Lagman Alarilla; Ma. Carla Lagman	Taekwondo	Women's team poomsae
31	Gold	John Paul Lizardo	Taekwondo	Men's Flyweight 58kg
32	Gold	Maria Camille Manalo	Taekwondo	Women's Lightweight 62kg
33	Gold	Kirstie Alora	Taekwondo	Women's Heavyweight +73kg
34	Gold	Denise Dy; Treat Huey	Tennis	Mixed doubles
35	Gold	Alex A. Generalo; Benedicto Oreta Zafra; Florence A. Caro; Ric Nacional; Ricky Mirana Sardenas; Rolando D. Isidro; Ambrosio A. Gotinas; Manuel M. Maya; Alex O. Sumagaysay; Diomedes B. Manalo; Ronnel B. Rafael; Joseph O. Magno; Dany M. Funela; Edward I. Balbuena; Jameson O. Buhamit; Louie Rodriguez Orias; Nelson I. Cordova; Raquiel P. Espinosa; Leonel P. Imus; Alberto T. Hugo; Alex A. Generalo; Datibo Romares; Edcer C. Penetrante; Hermie M. Macarana; Norwel T. Cajes	Traditional Boat Race	Men's team 20+1+1 500m
36	Gold	Ina Flores	Wall Climbing	Women's Boulder
37	Gold	Margarito Angana	Wrestling	Men's Greco-Roman 55kg
38	Gold	Jason Balabal	Wrestling	Men's Greco-Roman 84kg
39	Gold	Mark Eddiva	Wushu	Men's Sanshou 65kg
40	Gold	Eduard Folayang	Wushu	Men's Sanshou 70kg

=== Silver ===
No.	Medal	Name	Sport	Event
1	Silver	Earl Benjamin Jacinto Yap	Archery	Men's individual
2	Silver	Jennifer Dy Chan	Archery	Men's individual
3	Silver	Archand Christian Bagsit	Athletics	Men's 400m
4	Silver	Mervin Guarte	Athletics	Men's 800m
5	Silver	Mervin Guarte	Athletics	Men's 1500m
6	Silver	Eric Panique	Athletics	Men's Marathon
7	Silver	Henry Dagmil	Athletics	Men's long jump
8	Silver	Arniel Ferrera	Athletics	Men's hammer throw
9	Silver	Rosie Villarito	Athletics	Women's javelin throw
10	Silver	Narcisa Atienza	Athletics	Women's Heptathlon
11	Silver	Jessie Lacuna	Swimming	Men's 200m freestyle
12	Silver	Dorothy Grace Hong	Swimming	Women's 200m backstroke
13	Silver	Nino Carog; Jaime Asok	Diving	Men's 3m Synchronized Springboard
14	Silver	Rexel Fabriga; Jaime Asok	Diving	Men's 10m Synchronized Platform
15	Silver	Dexter Alamara; Norton Alamara; Dan Paolo Dela Cruz; Sean Bonyea Cruz; Kristoffer Roi Dela Cruz; Sherwin De La Paz; Dale Evangelista; Elcid Evangelista; Tani Gomez Jr. Raphael Evan Grabador; Ronald Alejo Guiriba; Teofilo Antonio Juan; Ryan Edward Tamula	Water Polo	Men's team
16	Silver	Analyn Almazan; Anna Katrina Pineda; Aurora Adriano; Bernadette Mercado; Chovi Borja; Diana Rose Jose; Joan Grajales; Karen Lomogda; Maria Lalaine Flores; Marites Gadian; Melissa Jacob; Merenciana Ewon Arayi; Treena Anne Therese Limgenco	Basketball	Women's team
17	Silver	Francisco Dela Cruz	Billiards	Men's Single 1-Cushion Carom
18	Silver	Rubilen Amit	Billiards	Women's 9-Ball Pool Singles
19	Silver	Jeremy Posadas	Bowling	Men's singles
20	Silver	Engelberto Rivera; Frederick Ong	Bowling	Men's doubles
21	Silver	Engelberto Rivera; Frederick Ong; Raoul Miranda; Jeremy Posadas; Gian Carlo Mansilungan; Rogelio Enriquez Jr.	Bowling	Men's team of Five
22	Silver	Frederick Ong	Bowling	Men's masters
23	Silver	Nesthy Petecio	Boxing	Women's Bantamweight 54kg
24	Silver	George Sy Soo; Encontro Mylene Urriquia	Bridge	Mixed Butler
25	Silver	Francisco Sainz Alquiroz; Allen L. Tan; Gemma Mariano; Viksi Egen	Bridge	Mixed Team
26	Silver	John Paul Gomez	Chess	Men's Blindfold
27	Silver	Wesley So	Chess	Men's Standard
28	Silver	Rulp Ylem Jose	Chess	Women's Standard
29	Silver	Oliver Barbosa; Catherine Perena	Chess	Mixed Standard
30	Silver	Joey Barba	Cycling	Men's Mountain Biking 1.5km Downhill
31	Silver	Mark Galledo	Cycling	Men's 180km Road Race
32	Silver	Epingger Apryl	Cycling	Women's Track 500m Individual Time Trial
33	Silver	Epingger Apryl	Cycling	Women's Track Sprint
34	Silver	Toni Leviste	Equestrian	Individual Jumping
35	Silver	Diego Lorenzo; Toni Leviste; Michelle Barrera; Joker Arroyo	Equestrian	Team Jumping
36	Silver	Philippines	Karate	Men's team kumite
37	Silver	Jul-Omar Abdulhakim	Pencak Silat	Men's tarung Class B 55kg
38	Silver	Benjamin Tolentino; Jose Turingan Rodriguez	Rowing	Men's double sculls
39	Silver	Ridgely Balladares; Rommel Chavez	Sailing	Men's international 470
40	Silver	Samuel Noguit; Jhomar Arcilla; Joseph Arcilla; Giovanni Pietro Mamawal; Mikoff Manduriao	Soft tennis	Men's team
41	Silver	Marvin Gabriel Vidal; Shaneen Sia	Taekwondo	Mixed Pair Poomsae
42	Silver	Jose Anthony Soriano	Taekwondo	Men's Middleweight 87kg
43	Silver	Alexander Briones	Taekwondo	Men's Heavyweight +87kg
44	Silver	Cecil Mamiit; Treat Huey	Tennis	Men's doubles
45	Silver	Cecil Mamiit; Treat Huey; Jeson Patrombon	Tennis	Men's team
46	Silver	Alex A. Generalo; Benedicto Oreta Zafra; Florence A. Caro; Ric Nacional; Ricky Mirana Sardenas; Rolando D. Isidro; Ambrosio A. Gotinas; Manuel M. Maya; Alex O. Sumagaysay; Diomedes B. Manalo; Ronnel B. Rafael; Joseph O. Magno	Traditional Boat Race	Men's team 10+1+1 500m
47	Silver	Alex A. Generalo; Benedicto Oreta Zafra; Florence A. Caro; Ric Nacional; Ricky Mirana Sardenas; Rolando D. Isidro; Ambrosio A. Gotinas; Manuel M. Maya; Alex O. Sumagaysay; Diomedes B. Manalo; Ronnel B. Rafael; Joseph O. Magno; Dany M. Funela; Edward I. Balbuena; Jameson O. Buhamit; Louie Rodriguez Orias; Nelson I. Cordova; Raquiel P. Espinosa; Leonel P. Imus; Alberto T. Hugo; Datibo Romares; Edcer C. Penetrante; Hermie M. Macarana; Norwel T. Cajes	Traditional Boat Race	Men's team 20+1+1 2000m
48	Silver	Hidilyn Diaz	Weightlifting	Women's 58kg
49	Silver	Michael Baletin	Wrestling	Men's Greco-Roman 74kg
50	Silver	Robertson Torres	Wrestling	Men's Greco-Roman 120kg
51	Silver	Roque Mana-ay	Wrestling	Men's freestyle 66kg
52	Silver	Daniel Parantac	Wushu	Men's taolu Taijiquan/Taijijian
53	Silver	John Keithly Chan; Engelbert Addongan; Eleazar Jacob	Wushu	Men's taolu duilian
54	Silver	Benjie Rivera	Wushu	Men's Sanshou 56kg
55	Silver	Mariane Mariano	Wushu	Women's Sanshou 56kg

=== Bronze ===
No.	Medal	Name	Sport	Event
1	Bronze	Eduardo Buenavista	Athletics	Men's Marathon
2	Bronze	Benigno Marayag	Athletics	Men's long jump
3	Bronze	Danilo Fresnido	Athletics	Men's javelin throw
4	Bronze	Katherin Santos	Athletics	Women's long jump
5	Bronze	Loralie Sermona	Athletics	Women's hammer throw
6	Bronze	Ryan Arabejo	Swimming	Men's 1500m freestyle
7	Bronze	Charles Walker; Jessie Lacuna; Dhill Anderson Lee; Kendrick Uy	Swimming	Men's 4x100m freestyle relay
8	Bronze	Charles Walker; Jessie Lacuna; Jose Gonzales; Ryan Arabejo	Swimming	Men's 4x200m freestyle relay
9	Bronze	Dorothy Grace Hong	Swimming	Women's 50m backstroke
10	Bronze	Dorothy Grace Hong	Swimming	Women's 100m backstroke
11	Bronze	Sheila Mae Perez; Cecil Domenios	Diving	Women's 3m Synchronized Springboard
12	Bronze	Efren Reyes	Billiards	Men's Single 1-Cushion Carom
13	Bronze	Reynaldo Grandea	Billiards	Men's Single 3-Cushion Carom
14	Bronze	Efren Reyes	Billiards	Men's Single 3-Cushion Carom
15	Bronze	Francisco Mertado	Billiards	Men's 9-Ball Pool Singles
16	Bronze	Engelberto Rivera; Frederick Ong; Raoul Miranda	Bowling	Men's trios
17	Bronze	Rey Saludar	Boxing	Women's Flyweight 52kg
18	Bronze	Gemma Mariano; Encontro Mylene Urriquia; Viksi Egan; Rosemarie A. Unson	Bridge	Women's team
19	Bronze	Darwin Laylo	Chess	Men's Blindfold
20	Bronze	Mark Paragua	Chess	Men's Blitz
21	Bronze	Catherin Perena	Chess	Women's Rapid
22	Bronze	Nino Surban	Cycling	Men's Mountain Biking Cross Country
23	Bronze	Mark Galledo	Cycling	Men's Road 50km Individual Time Trial
24	Bronze	Mark Galledo; George Oconer; Lloyd Reynante; Ronald Gorantes	Cycling	Men's Road 70km team Time Trial
25	Bronze	Mier Lohn Renee	Cycling	Men's Track 4km Individual Pursuit
26	Bronze	Jan Paul Morales; Alfie Pajo Catalan; Mier Lohn Renee; Arnold Marcelo	Cycling	Men's Track 4km team Pursuit
27	Bronze	Jan Paul Morales	Cycling	Men's Track 10km Scratch Race
28	Bronze	Epingger Apryl	Cycling	Women's Track 5km Scratch Race
29	Bronze	Gian Carlo Nocom; Edmon Velez; Eric Brando II	Fencing	Men's team sabre
30	Bronze	Jylyn Nicanor; Lenny Otadoy; Michelle Brozula	Fencing	Women's team sabre
31	Bronze	Madel Galvez; Harlene Orendain; Michelle Brozula	Fencing	Women's team Epee
32	Bronze	Franz Garett Baaco; Leonard Angelo Sabellina; Matthew Earl Rodriguez; Mike Godoy	Fin swimming	Men's 4x100m Bi-Fins
33	Bronze	Dottie Ardina	Golf	Women's individual
34	Bronze	Ma. Victoria Alicia Recinto	Gymnastics	Women's Rhythmic Hoop
35	Bronze	Lloyd Dennis Catipon	Judo	Men's Combat 66kg
36	Bronze	Gilbert Ramirez	Judo	Men's Combat 73kg
37	Bronze	John Baylon	Judo	Men's Combat 81kg
38	Bronze	Helen Dawa	Judo	Women's Combat 48kg
39	Bronze	Jenie Lou Mosqueda	Judo	Women's Combat 52kg
40	Bronze	Kiyomi Watanabe	Judo	Women's Combat 70kg
41	Bronze	James delos Santos	Karate	Men's individual Kata
42	Bronze	Jayson Ramil Macaalay	Karate	Men's kumite -60kg
43	Bronze	Ronnel Garcia Balingit	Karate	Men's kumite -84kg
44	Bronze	Erica Celin Samonte	Karate	Women's kumite -50kg
45	Bronze	Mae Soriano	Karate	Women's kumite -55kg
46	Bronze	Philippines	Karate	Women's team kumite
47	Bronze	Christopher Yabut	Pencak Silat	Men's tarung Class C 60kg
48	Bronze	Ronald Perena	Pencak Silat	Men's tarung Class F 75kg
49	Bronze	Nerlyn Huinda	Pencak Silat	Women's tarung Class C 60kg
50	Bronze	Edgar Recan Ilas; Alvin Lopez Amposta	Rowing	Men's lightweight double sculls
51	Bronze	Geylord Coveta	Sailing	Men's Mistral One Design
52	Bronze	Philippines	Sepak Takraw	Men's doubles
53	Bronze	Joseph Arcilla	Soft Tennis	Men's singles
54	Bronze	Joseph Arcilla; Jhomar Arcilla	Soft Tennis	Men's doubles
55	Bronze	Cheryl Macasera; Deena Rose Cruz	Soft Tennis	Women's doubles
56	Bronze	Samuel Noguit; Noelle Zoleta	Soft Tennis	Mixed doubles
57	Bronze	Josephine Paaguyo; Cheryl Macasera; Deena Rose Cruz; Divina Gracia Escala; Noelle Zoleta	Soft Tennis	Women's team
58	Bronze	Richard Gonzales; Rodel Valle	Table Tennis	Men's doubles
59	Bronze	Marvin Gabriel Vidal	Taekwondo	Men's individual poomsae
60	Bronze	Samuel Morrison	Taekwondo	Men's Featherweight 68kg
61	Bronze	Leigh Anne Nuguid	Taekwondo	Women's finweight 46kg
62	Bronze	Pauline Lopez	Taekwondo	Women's Flyweight 49kg
63	Bronze	Karla Avala	Taekwondo	Women's Featherweight 57kg
64	Bronze	Cecil Mamiit	Tennis	Men's singles
65	Bronze	Anna Clarice Patrimonio	Tennis	Women's singles
66	Bronze	Anna Clarice Patrimonio; Denise Dy; Marian Capadocia	Tennis	Women's team
67	Bronze	Alex A. Generalo; Benedicto Oreta Zafra; Florence A. Caro; Ric Nacional; Ricky Mirana Sardenas; Rolando D. Isidro; Ambrosio A. Gotinas; Manuel M. Maya; Alex O. Sumagaysay; Diomedes B. Manalo; Ronnel B. Rafael; Joseph O. Magno	Traditional Boat Race	Men's team 10+1+1 1000m
68	Bronze	Alex A. Generalo; Benedicto Oreta Zafra; Florence A. Caro; Ric Nacional; Ricky Mirana Sardenas; Rolando D. Isidro; Ambrosio A. Gotinas; Manuel M. Maya; Alex O. Sumagaysay; Diomedes B. Manalo; Ronnel B. Rafael; Joseph O. Magno; Dany M. Funela; Edward I. Balbuena; Jameson O. Buhamit; Louie Rodriguez Orias; Nelson I. Cordova; Raquiel P. Espinosa; Leonel P. Imus; Alberto T. Hugo; Datibo Romares; Edcer C. Penetrante; Hermie M. Macarana; Norwel T. Cajes	Traditional Boat Race	Men's team 20+1+1 1000m
69	Bronze	Maria Samantha Melly	Water Skiing	Women's Wakeboard
70	Bronze	Christopher A. Bureros	Weightlifting	Men's 94kg
71	Bronze	Richard Pep Agosto	Weightlifting	Men's +105kg
72	Bronze	Paulo delos Santos	Wrestling	Men's freestyle 55kg
73	Bronze	Jimmy Angana	Wrestling	Men's freestyle 74kg
74	Bronze	Jason Balabal	Wrestling	Men's freestyle 96kg
75	Bronze	Dembert Arcita	Wushu	Men's Sanshou 52kg
76	Bronze	Natasha Enriquez; Kathylynne Sabalburo; Kariza Kris Chan	Wushu	Women's taolu duilian
77	Bronze	Rhea May Rifani	Wushu	Women's Sanshou 48kg

== Medal summary ==
=== By sports ===
According to Philippine Sports Commission Chairman Ritchie Garcia, he expects the country to haul at least 70 Gold Medals. He mentioned boxing, taekwondo, billiards, basketball, softball, baseball, wushu, swimming and athletics as the sports that will harvest sure gold medals in the SEA Games.

Rank	Sport	Gold	Silver	Bronze	Total
1	Taekwondo	4	3	5	12
2	Boxing	4	1	1	6
3	Athletics	3	8	5	16
4	Billiards and snooker	3	2	4	9
5	Gymnastics	3	0	1	4
6	Cycling	2	4	7	13
7	Wushu	2	4	3	9
8	Wrestling	2	3	3	8
9	Bridge	2	2	1	5
10	Softball	2	0	0	2
11	Chess	1	4	3	8
12	Bowling	1	4	1	6
13	Tennis	1	2	3	6
14	Traditional boat race	1	2	2	5
15	Archery	1	2	0	3
15	Equestrian	1	2	0	3
17	Rowing	1	1	1	3
18	Basketball	1	1	0	2
19	Judo	1	0	6	7
20	Fencing	1	0	3	4
21	Fin swimming	1	0	1	2
22	Baseball	1	0	0	1
22	Wall climbing	1	0	0	1
24	Swimming	0	2	5	7
25	Diving	0	2	1	3
26	Karate	0	1	6	7
27	Soft tennis	0	1	5	6
28	Pencak silat	0	1	3	4
29	Weightlifting	0	1	2	3
30	Sailing	0	1	1	2
31	Water polo	0	1	0	1
32	Golf	0	0	1	1
32	Sepak takraw	0	0	1	1
32	Table tennis	0	0	1	1
32	Water skiing	0	0	1	1
Totals (35 entries)		40	55	77	172

=== By date ===
Daily: Overall Medals
Day	Date	Gold medal	Silver medal	Bronze medal	Total
Day 1	11th	0	0	0	0
Day 2	12th	4	2	5	11
Day 3	13th	1	7	8	16
Day 4	14th	3	7	9	19
Day 5	15th	6	5	5	16
Day 6	16th	1	8	10	19
Day 7	17th	4	5	6	15
Day 8	18th	0	3	7	10
Day 9	19th	4	6	15	25
Day 10	20th	4	7	8	19
Day 11	21st	9	6	4	19
Day 12	22nd	0	0	0	0

== Results ==
The Philippines sweeps the Softball event winning both Men's and Women's Division. Philippine Sinag Team earns their 15th overall medal in the men's Basketball. On the second day of the competitions, Marestella Torres broke the SEA Games Record she made in the 2009 Southeast Asian Games by registering 6.71 m in the women's long jump.

This is the first time since 2001 wherein Filipino Tankers did not deliver any Gold Medals primarily due to the retirement of Olympian Miguel Molina and absence of other veteran Tankers.

For the second time in the history of the Southeast Asian Games, the Philippines placed in one of its lowest, ranking 6th, with 36 gold medals. The same thing happened in 2007 when the country placed 6th with 41 gold medals.
