= Finswimming at the 2011 SEA Games =

Watersport competition in Palembang, Indonesia

Fin swimming at the 2011 SEA Games

Finswimming at the 2011 SEA Games was held at the Jakabaring Sport Complex in Palembang, Indonesia from 19 to 21 November 2011.

== Medal table ==
* Host nation (Indonesia)

Rank	Nation	Gold	Silver	Bronze	Total
1	Indonesia*	7	8	2	17
2	Vietnam	6	5	6	17
3	Thailand	2	3	7	12
4	Philippines	1	0	1	2
Totals (4 entries)		16	16	16	48

== Medal summary ==
=== Men ===
Event	Gold	Silver	Bronze
100 m bi-fins	Nutt Wesshasartar; Thailand	Reza Novaris; Indonesia	Nguyễn Ngọc Quang; Vietnam
50 m surface	Muhammad Nurul Fajri; Indonesia	Adrian Sansoldi Lamano; Indonesia	Pawat Matjiur; Thailand
100 m surface	Nguyễn Trung Kiên; Vietnam	Phan Lưu Cẩm Thành; Vietnam	Pawat Matjiur; Thailand
200 m surface	Petrol Apostle Kambey; Indonesia	Reinhard Tommel; Indonesia	Nguyễn Trung Kiên; Vietnam
400 m surface	Trần Bảo Thu; Vietnam	Hans Yosaputra; Indonesia	Võ Quang Đại; Vietnam
800 m surface	Hans Yosaputra; Indonesia	Trần Bảo Thu; Vietnam	Đỗ Xuân Thiên; Vietnam
4 × 100 m bi-fins	Thailand; Akkarawat Ruangchairit; Nutt Wesshasartar; Raphiphon Sornmane; Sorasit Hanwiwattanakul	Indonesia; Bayu Adiwibowo; Christofel Keng Masengi; Evan Adiputra; Muhammad Nurul Fajri	Philippines; Franz Garett D. Baaco; Leonard Angelo N. Sabellina; Matthew Earll F. Rodriguez; Mike Godoy
4 × 100 m surface	Indonesia; Adrian Sansoldi Lamano; Bayu Adiwibowo; Oktavia Riyanto; Petrol Apostle Kambey	Vietnam; Nguyen Trong Quan; Nguyễn Trung Kiên; Phan Van Tien; Phan Lưu Cẩm Thành	Thailand; Akkarawat Ruangchairit; Panjapol Kongkhieo; Pawat Matjiur; Sorasit Hanwiwattanakul

=== Women ===
Event	Gold	Silver	Bronze
100 m bi-fins	Margaretha Herawati; Indonesia	Amanita Muskarianny; Indonesia	Tassamol Petchsangroj; Thailand
50 m surface	Danielle Faith San; Philippines	Kakkanang Prapaisub; Thailand	Natanong Butthajorn; Thailand
100 m surface	Nguyen Thi Giang; Vietnam	Phan Lưu Kỳ Duyên; Vietnam	Tassamol Petchsangroj; Thailand
200 m surface	Angeline Soegianto; Indonesia	Dương Thị Huyền Trang; Vietnam	Thi Truc Linh Nguyen; Vietnam
400 m surface	Angeline Soegianto; Indonesia	Priscilia Gunawan; Indonesia	Dang Thi Minh Thuy; Vietnam
800 m surface	Nguyễn Thị Thương; Vietnam	Priscilia Gunawan; Indonesia	Seroja Mutiara Abadi; Indonesia
4 × 100 m bi-fins	Vietnam; Dương Thị Huyền Trang; Nguyễn Thị Quỳnh; Thi Truc Linh Nguyen; Võ Thị Đài Trang	Thailand; Kakkanang Prapaisub; Natanong Butthajorn; Nutchar Theprungsirikul; Tassamol Petchsangroj	Indonesia; Amanita Muskarianny; Delyana; Fachriza Rosyadi; Margaretha Herawati
4 × 100 m surface	Vietnam; Dương Thị Huyền Trang; Nguyễn Thị Quỳnh; Nguyễn Thị Thương; Phan Lưu Kỳ Duyên	Indonesia; Angeline Soegianto; Delyana; Fachriza Rosyadi; Janis Rosalita Suprianto	Thailand; Kakkanang Prapaisub; Natanong Butthajorn; Nutchar Theprungsirikul; Tassamol Petchsangroj
