= Vovinam at the 2011 SEA Games =

Vovinam at the 26th SEA Games was held in Jakarta, Indonesia.

== Participating nations ==
Athletes from 4 nations were scheduled to participate.

- Cambodia
- Indonesia
- Laos
- Vietnam

== Medal summary ==
=== Men ===
Event	Gold	Silver	Bronze
Single weapon	Thammavongsa Phaylath; Laos	Huỳnh Khắc Nguyên; Vietnam	Sorn Elit; Cambodia
Single weapon	Thammavongsa Phaylath; Laos	Huỳnh Khắc Nguyên; Vietnam	I Wayan Sumertayasa; Indonesia
Single without weapon	Ly Boramy; Cambodia	Trần Công Tạo; Vietnam	I Made Pranamaya; Indonesia
Weapon double	Vietnam; Lâm Đông Vượng; Trần Thế Thường	Cambodia; Chin Piseth; Chrin Bunlong	Indonesia; I Kadek Ari Sutara; I Putu Ruwita
Attacking by leg	Vietnam; Nguyễn Văn Cường; Huỳnh Khắc Nguyên; Nguyễn Bình Định; Phan Ngọc Tới	Cambodia; Chrin Bunlong; Kat Sopheak; Ly Boramy; San Socheat	Indonesia; I Kadek Mogi Bahana Lenge; I Putu Aris Sanjaya; Dewa Made Juni Artana; I Putu Agus Ardiana
Multi weapon	Indonesia; I Gusti Agung Gede Ary Wirawan; Dewa Gede Tomi Sanjaya; Gede Wisnu Atmadi Sudewa; I Nyoman Suryawan	Vietnam; Nguyễn Bình Định; Nguyễn Văn Cường; Trần Công Tạo; Huỳnh Khắc Nguyên	Laos; Xayyasid Xayyasom; Chantasida Chantalangsy; Sihalath Ketsada; Vongphakdy Thongkhanh
Combat 55 kg	Võ Nguyên Linh; Vietnam	Tin Pheap; Cambodia	Kadek Dwi Dharmadi; Indonesia
Combat 55 kg	Võ Nguyên Linh; Vietnam	Tin Pheap; Cambodia	Taypanyavong Soukanh; Laos
Combat 60 kg	Nguyễn Duy Khánh; Vietnam	Lim Paov Houngyan; Cambodia	I Gusti Ngurah Pujaka; Indonesia
Combat 60 kg	Nguyễn Duy Khánh; Vietnam	Lim Paov Houngyan; Cambodia	Bounthavy Vixay; Laos

=== Women ===
Event	Gold	Silver	Bronze
Single weapon	Manik Trisna Dewi; Indonesia	Pal Chhorraksmy; Cambodia	Mai Thị Kim Thuỳ; Vietnam
Single without weapon	Kadek Wulandari; Indonesia	Pal Chhorraksmy; Cambodia	Hứa Lê Cẩm Xuân; Vietnam
Weapon double	Indonesia; Ni Made Ratna Dewi; Luh Gede Arista Dewi	Vietnam; Hứa Lê Cẩm Xuân; Mai Thị Kim Thuỳ	Laos; Vongphackdy Malaythong; Khamvilaythong Noudsalin
Combat 50 kg	Trần Khánh Trang; Vietnam	Dewik Puji Astutik; Indonesia	Mao Monita; Cambodia
Combat 50 kg	Trần Khánh Trang; Vietnam	Dewik Puji Astutik; Indonesia	Xaypao Pailor; Laos
Combat 55 kg	Chanthanivong Vongduean; Laos	Nguyen Thi Cham; Vietnam	Vy Srey Khouch; Cambodia
Combat 55 kg	Chanthanivong Vongduean; Laos	Nguyen Thi Cham; Vietnam	Ni Putu Evi Windari; Indonesia

=== Mixed ===
Event	Gold	Silver	Bronze
Women's defence	Indonesia; I Ketut Sulendra; Anak Agung Eni Khusumayanti	Cambodia; Ly Boramy; Pal Chhorraksmy	shared silver
Women's defence	Indonesia; I Ketut Sulendra; Anak Agung Eni Khusumayanti	Vietnam; Lê Bảo Giang; Phạm Thị Mỹ Dung	shared silver
Women's multi weapon	Cambodia; Pal Chhorraksmy; Prak Vanny; Ly Boramy; San Socheat	Vietnam; Phan Ngọc Tới; Nguyễn Bình Định; Nguyễn Văn Cường; Phạm Thị Phượng	Indonesia; Agus Saka Aryadi Putra; I Gede Suwiwa; Ni Luh Kadek Apriyanti; I Gede Kusuma Jaya

== Medal table ==
* Host nation (Indonesia)

Rank	Nation	Gold	Silver	Bronze	Total
1	Vietnam	5	7	2	14
2	Indonesia*	5	1	8	14
3	Cambodia	2	7	3	12
4	Laos	2	0	5	7
Totals (4 entries)		14	15	18	47
