= Roller sports at the 2011 SEA Games =

Roller sports at the 2011 Southeast Asian Games was held in Palembang, Indonesia. A total of 12 events were held at Jakabaring Sport City.

== Medal summary ==
=== Men ===
Event	Gold	Silver	Bronze
300 m individual time trial	Allan Chandra; Indonesia	Chutipon Nakarungsu; Thailand	Mirko Andrasi; Indonesia
500 m	Stevanus Wihardja; Indonesia	Zarki Rosa; Indonesia	Chutipon Nakarungsu; Thailand
1500 m	Johannes Wihardja; Indonesia	Jitasabha Nikko Amrullah; Indonesia	Natthapong Chansiri; Thailand
5000 m points	Muhammad Oky Andriyanto; Indonesia	M. Arif Rahman; Indonesia	Daryl Chan Chiang; Singapore
10000 m points + elimination	Erlangga Ardianza; Indonesia	Dimas Prasetya Putera; Indonesia	Daryl Chan Chiang; Singapore
3000 m relays	Indonesia; Allan Chandra; Evan Christian; Faisal Norman	Thailand; Chutipon Nakarungsu; Jeerasak Tassorn; Natthapong Chansiri	Singapore; Daryl Chan Chiang; Chew Wee; Lim June Liang

=== Women ===
Event	Gold	Silver	Bronze
300 m individual time trial	Devi Pramudita; Indonesia	Aisha Karimawati; Indonesia	Rebecca Chew Rui Jun; Singapore
500 m	Della Olivia; Indonesia	Anggi Rahmadini; Indonesia	Emily Kwek; Singapore
1500 m	Sylvia; Indonesia	Anindya Wening Melati; Indonesia	Rebecca Chew Rui Jun; Singapore
5000 m points	Ajeng Anindya Prasalita; Indonesia	Latifa Hikmawati; Indonesia	Carmen Goh Jia Man; Singapore
10000 m points + elimination	Ajeng Anindya Prasalita; Indonesia	Sylvia; Indonesia	Carmen Goh Jia Man; Singapore
3000 m relays	Indonesia; Anindya Wening Melati; Della Olivia; Latifa Hikmawati	Singapore; Carmen Goh Jia Man; Emily Kwek; Rebecca Chew Rui Jun	Malaysia; Akidah Aziah Ramly; Lai Yi Zhao; Carlyle Lim

== Medal table ==
* Host nation (Indonesia)

Rank	Nation	Gold	Silver	Bronze	Total
1	Indonesia (INA)*	12	9	1	22
2	Thailand (THA)	0	2	2	4
3	Singapore (SIN)	0	1	8	9
4	Malaysia (MAS)	0	0	1	1
Totals (4 entries)		12	12	12	36
