= Cambodia at the 2011 SEA Games =

Cambodia at the 2011 Southeast Asian Games
- IOC code: CAM
- NOC: National Olympic Committee of Cambodia
- Website: www.noccambodia.org (in Khmer and English)

in Jakarta and Palembang
- Competitors: 163
- Flag bearer: Svay Ratha (boxing)
- Officials: 67
- Medals Ranked 9th: Gold 4 Silver 11 Bronze 24 Total 39

Southeast Asian Games appearances (overview)
- 1961; 1965; 1967–1981; 1983; 1985; 1987; 1989–1993; 1995; 1997; 1999; 2001; 2003; 2005; 2007; 2009; 2011; 2013; 2015; 2017; 2019; 2021; 2023; 2025; 2027; 2029

Cambodia is participating at the 2011 Southeast Asian Games which are being held in the cities of Palembang and Jakarta, Indonesia from 11 November 2011 to 22 November 2011.

== Medals ==
=== Medal table ===
Sport	Gold	Silver	Bronze	Total
Vovinam	2	7	3	12
Shorinji Kempo	1	1	6	8
Pétanque	1	1	2	4
Taekwondo	0	1	3	4
Judo	0	1	0	1
Wrestling	0	0	5	5
Boxing	0	0	3	3
Tennis	0	0	1	1
Wushu	0	0	1	1
Total	4	11	24	39

=== Medals by date ===
Daily: Overall Medals
Day	Date	Gold medal	Silver medal	Bronze medal	Total
Day 1	11th	0	0	0	0
Day 2	12th	0	0	1	1
Day 3	13th	0	0	1	1
Day 4	14th	1	3	6	10
Day 5	15th	1	4	2	7
Day 6	16th	1	2	2	5
Day 7	17th	0	1	5	6
Day 8	18th	0	0	0	0
Day 9	19th	0	1	6	7
Day 10	20th	1	0	1	2
Day 11	21st	0	0	0	0
Day 12	22nd	0	0	0	0

=== Medalists ===
Medal	Name	Sport	Event
Gold	Ly Boramy	Vovinam	Single Man Without Weapon - Male
Silver	Tin Pheap	Vovinam	55 kg - Male
Silver	Chrin Bunlong; Kat Sopheak; Ly Boramy; San Socheat	Vovinam	Men's Attacking By Leg - Male
Silver	Pal Chhorraksmy	Vovinam	Single Women Weapon - Female
Bronze	Mao Monita	Vovinam	50 kg - Female
Bronze	Chhoeung Puthearim	Taekwondo	Bantam Weight Over 49 kg & Not Exceeding 53 kg - Female
Bronze	Sorn Seavmey	Taekwondo	Light Weight Over 57 kg & Not Exceeding 62 kg - Female
Bronze	Phon Virak	Taekwondo	Middle Weight Over 80 kg & Not Exceeding 87 kg - Male
Bronze	Chab Linh	Wrestling	50 kg (Greco-Roman) - Male
Bronze	Nuth Sophol	Wrestling	60 kg (Greco-Roman) - Male
Bronze	Sok Chan Mean	Pétanque	Men Singles - Male
