= John Baylon =

Filipino judoka (born 1965)

- Born: November 6, 1965 (age 60)
- Nationality: Filipino
- Trainer: Toshiyuki Wado (Brazilian jiu-jitsu)
- Rank: Black belt judo Black belt Brazilian jiu-jitsu

Other information
- Notable club: Clube de jiu-jitsu (Japan)
- Notable school: Kodokan Judo Institute

John Baylon (born November 6, 1965) is a Filipino judoka who has competed in the Summer Olympics and a multi-medalist in the Southeast Asian Games.

== Career ==
He trained in Judo in Japan at the Kōdōkan where he obtained his Judo black belt.

He competed at the 1988 Summer Olympics and the 1992 Summer Olympics.

Baylon has won a total of nine gold medals in the Southeast Asian Games, first competing in the regional tournament in the 1980s. His first gold medal in the games was in the 1991 edition which was hosted in Manila. He was the flagbearer of the Philippine Southeast Asian Games delegation in 2007. In 2002, Baylon decided to take up Brazilian jiu-jitsu and obtained his black belt in the discipline from Toshiyuki Wado in 2008. He also won medals in Judo at the World Masters, and Asian Games.

In the 2011 edition, he failed to win a gold after he was defeated by Vietnamese judoka, Hai Long To in the 81 kg category semifinal. This led to him announcing his retirement from competitive judo.

== Retirement ==
After his retirement, he went on to become a coach in Brazilian jiu-jitsu and Judo based in Metro Manila.
