= Sport climbing at the 2011 SEA Games =

- Nations: 6

Competition climbing at the 26th Southeast Asian Games was held in Jakarta, Indonesia. It was the first time the discipline was introduced to the SEA Games.

== Participating nations ==
- Philippines
- Indonesia
- Malaysia
- Singapore
- Thailand
- Vietnam

== Medal summary ==
=== Men ===
Event	Gold	Silver	Bronze
Boulder	A'an Aviansyah; Indonesia	Jay Koh; Singapore	Hafzanizam; Malaysia
Lead	Amri; Indonesia	Nurmansyah Putra; Indonesia	Zul Fadzli Shafiee; Malaysia
Speed record	Galar Pandu Asmoro; Indonesia	Tonny Mamiri; Indonesia	Adriel Choo; Singapore
Speed track	Abu Dzar Yulianto; Indonesia	Phan Thanh Nhiên; Vietnam	Adriel Choo; Singapore
Speed relays	Indonesia; Hermawan; Abu Dzar Yulianto; Galar Pandu Asmoro	Malaysia; Khairul Hafiz; Mohd Redha Rozlan; Jonathan Hwa	Singapore; Muhammad Faizeen; Muhd Zaki Ramli; Adriel Choo

=== Women ===
Event	Gold	Silver	Bronze
Boulder	Ina Flores; Philippines	Watchareewan Tomas; Thailand	Ann Chung; Singapore
Lead	Wilda Baco Ahmad; Indonesia	Ilmawaty Labanu; Indonesia	Puntarika Tunyavanich; Thailand
Speed record	Tita Supita; Indonesia	Evi Neliwati; Indonesia	Judith Sim; Singapore
Speed track	Fitriyanti; Indonesia	Santi Wellyanti; Indonesia	Judith Sim; Singapore
Speed relays	Indonesia; Tri Adianti; Fifi Lia Anggraini; Evi Neliwati	Thailand; Puntarika Tunyavanich; Pratthana Raksachat; Pankaew Plypoolsup	Singapore; Zhang Bin Bin; Judith Sim; Janice Ng

== Medal table ==
* Host nation (Indonesia)

Rank	Nation	Gold	Silver	Bronze	Total
1	Indonesia (INA)*	9	5	0	14
2	Philippines (PHI)	1	0	0	1
3	Thailand (THA)	0	2	1	3
4	Singapore (SIN)	0	1	7	8
5	Malaysia (MAS)	0	1	2	3
6	Vietnam (VIE)	0	1	0	1
Totals (6 entries)		10	10	10	30
