= Thailand at the 2011 SEA Games =

Thailand at the 2011 Southeast Asian Games
- IOC code: THA
- NOC: National Olympic Committee of Thailand
- Website: www.olympicthai.or.th/eng (in English and Thai)

in Jakarta and Palembang
- Competitors: 766
- Officials: 338
- Medals Ranked 2nd: Gold 109 Silver 100 Bronze 119 Total 328

Southeast Asian Games appearances (overview)
- 1961; 1965; 1967; 1969; 1971; 1973; 1975; 1977; 1979; 1981; 1983; 1985; 1987; 1989; 1991; 1993; 1995; 1997; 1999; 2001; 2003; 2005; 2007; 2009; 2011; 2013; 2015; 2017; 2019; 2021; 2023; 2025; 2027; 2029

Thailand is participating in the 2011 Southeast Asian Games which is being held in the cities of Palembang and Jakarta, Indonesia from 11 November 2011 to 22 November 2011. It won 109 gold, 100 silver and 119 bronze medals.

== Medals ==
=== Medal table ===
Sport	Gold	Silver	Bronze	Total
Athletics	14	8	10	32
Weightlifting	9	2	1	12
Swimming	8	7	5	20
Taekwondo	7	3	2	12
Boxing	7	1	2	10
Judo	5	3	6	14
Canoeing	5	2	3	10
Sailing	4	3	1	8
Sepak Takraw	4	0	0	4
Wrestling	3	5	4	12
Rowing	3	3	3	9
Gymnastic - Artistic	3	2	3	8
Fencing	3	1	9	13
Petanque	3	1	2	6
Cycling	2	8	4	14
Paragliding	3	1	2	6
Fin Swimming	2	3	7	12
Tennis	2	3	4	9
Golf	2	3	0	5
Water Ski	2	2	1	5
Ekuestrian	2	2	1	5
Bridge	2	1	2	5
Billiard & Snooker	2	1	1	4
Futsal	2	0	0	2
Volleyball	2	0	0	2
Shooting	1	6	5	12
Badminton	1	2	6	9
Gymnastic - Aerobic	1	1	1	3
Gymnastic - Rhythmic	1	1	0	2
Basketball	1	1	0	2
Wushu	1	0	3	4
Beach Volleyball	1	0	2	3
Chess	1	0	0	1
Bowling	1	0	0	1
Soft Tennis	0	4	5	9
Pencak Silat	0	4	3	7
Traditional Boat Race	0	2	5	7
Karate-Do	0	2	4	6
Roller Sport	0	2	2	4
Wall Climbing	0	2	1	3
Archery	0	1	4	5
Table Tennis	0	1	2	3
Synchronized Swimming	0	1	1	2
Softball	0	1	0	1
Baseball	0	0	1	1
Diving	0	0	1	1
Total	109	100	119	328

=== Medals by date ===
Daily: Overall Medals
Day	Date	Gold medal	Silver medal	Bronze medal	Total
Day 1	11th	3	0	3	6
Day 2	12th	3	9	6	18
Day 3	13th	15	9	16	40
Day 4	14th	17	9	12	38
Day 5	15th	10	8	18	36
Day 6	16th	5	9	3	17
Day 7	17th	12	15	12	39
Day 8	18th	7	5	13	25
Day 9	19th	16	12	15	43
Day 10	20th	9	8	13	30
Day 11	21st	10	16	8	34
Day 12	22nd	2	0	0	2
