= Indonesia at the 2011 SEA Games =

Indonesia at the 2011 Southeast Asian Games
- IOC code: INA
- NOC: Indonesian Olympic Committee
- Website: www.nocindonesia.or.id (in English)

in Jakarta and Palembang 11 - 22 November 2011
- Competitors: 1053 in 42 sports
- Flag bearer: Muhammad Akbar Nasution (swimming)
- Officials: 393
- Medals Ranked 1st: Gold 182 Silver 151 Bronze 143 Total 476

Southeast Asian Games appearances (overview)
- 1977; 1979; 1981; 1983; 1985; 1987; 1989; 1991; 1993; 1995; 1997; 1999; 2001; 2003; 2005; 2007; 2009; 2011; 2013; 2015; 2017; 2019; 2021; 2023; 2025; 2027; 2029

Indonesia participated at the 2011 Southeast Asian Games which is being held in the cities of Palembang and Jakarta, Indonesia from 11 November 2011 to 22 November 2011.

== Medals ==
=== Medal table ===
Sport	Gold	Silver	Bronze	Total
Athletics	13	12	11	36
Roller sports	12	9	1	22
Karate	10	2	4	16
Pencak silat	9	5	2	16
Wall climbing	9	5	0	14
Swimming	6	8	10	24
Canoeing	6	5	2	13
Taekwondo	6	3	5	14
Wushu	8	3	3	14
Soft tennis	7	2	2	11
Badminton	5	4	2	11
Shorinji Kempo	8	7	1	16
Vovinam	5	1	8	14
Wrestling	4	5	3	12
Water skiing	4	3	5	12
Archery	4	0	2	6
Weightlifting	4	8	2	14
Judo	4	2	7	13
Bridge	4	1	3	7
Rowing	3	1	1	5
Equestrian	3	2	1	6
Golf	2	1	1	4
Shooting	2	0	2	4
Fencing	1	6	2	9
Diving	1	3	4	8
Billiard and snooker	1	3	2	6
Gymnastics	1	2	6	9
Sailing	1	2	1	4
Beach volleyball	1	2	0	3
Finswimming	7	8	2	17
Tennis	4	2	3	9
Dragon boat	0	5	4	9
Open water swimming	0	2	2	4
Synchronized swimming	0	1	4	5
Boxing	2	3	5	10
Sepak takraw	1	3	2	6
Bowling	0	1	1	2
Water polo	0	1	1	2
Softball	0	1	1	2
Chess	1	2	2	5
Baseball	0	1	0	1
Football	0	1	0	1
Table tennis	0	0	3	3
Basketball	0	0	1	1
Volleyball	0	1	1	2
Cycling	12	8	9	29
Paragliding	11	4	6	21
Total	182	151	143	476

=== Medals by date ===
Daily: Overall Medals
Day	Date	Gold medal	Silver medal	Bronze medal	Total
Day 1	11th	2	2	1	5
Day 2	12th	21	13	9	43
Day 3	13th	17	14	14	45
Day 4	14th	20	21	14	55
Day 5	15th	18	11	21	50
Day 6	16th	11	5	10	26
Day 7	17th	20	15	8	43
Day 8	18th	16	13	15	44
Day 9	19th	15	21	15	51
Day 10	20th	16	20	18	54
Day 11	21st	26	16	17	59
Day 12	22nd	0	0	1	1
