= Malaysia at the 2011 SEA Games =

Malaysia at the 2011 Southeast Asian Games
- IOC code: MAS
- NOC: Olympic Council of Malaysia
- Website: www.olympic.org.my (in English)

in Jakarta and Palembang
- Competitors: 608 in 31 sports
- Flag bearer: Bibiana Ng Pei Chin (shooting)
- Officials: 261
- Medals Ranked 4th: Gold 58 Silver 50 Bronze 81 Total 189

Southeast Asian Games appearances (overview)
- 1959; 1961; 1965; 1967; 1969; 1971; 1973; 1975; 1977; 1979; 1981; 1983; 1985; 1987; 1989; 1991; 1993; 1995; 1997; 1999; 2001; 2003; 2005; 2007; 2009; 2011; 2013; 2015; 2017; 2019; 2021; 2023; 2025; 2027; 2029

Malaysia competed in the 2011 Southeast Asian Games held in Palembang, Indonesia from 11–25 November 2011.

== Medal summary ==
Medals by sport
Sport	1st place, gold medalist(s)	2nd place, silver medalist(s)	3rd place, bronze medalist(s)	Total	Rank
Archery	2	5	1	8	3
Aquatics	19	13	6	38	1
Athletics	6	2	3	11	4
Badminton	0	1	2	3	4
Basketball	0	0	1	1	3
Billiards and snooker	1	0	1	2	6
Bowling	5	3	6	14	1
Boxing	0	1	3	4	6
Canoeing	0	0	1	1	6
Chess	0	0	1	1	6
Cycling	7	3	1	4	2
Equestrian	0	0	1	1	5
Fencing	2	0	5	7	3
Football	1	0	0	1	1
Golf	0	0	2	2	3
Gymnastics	0	2	0	2	6
Judo	0	0	3	3	8
Karate	4	2	8	14	2
Paragliding	0	2	4	6	3
Pencak silat	3	1	7	11	3
Pétanque	0	0	4	4	5
Roller sports	0	0	1	1	4
Rowing	0	0	1	1	7
Sailing	0	1	3	4	4
Sepak takraw	0	0	2	2	6
Shooting	2	4	3	9	2
Taekwondo	0	2	2	4	6
Wall climbing	0	1	2	3	5
Waterskiing	4	3	1	8	2
Weightlifting	0	1	2	3	4
Wushu	3	3	5	11	3
Total	59	50	81	190	4

Medals by day
Day	Date	Gold medal	Silver medal	Bronze medal	Total
Day 1	11th	0	0	0	0
Day 2	12th	2	5	8	15
Day 3	13th	7	5	10	22
Day 4	14th	4	4	5	13
Day 5	15th	9	9	13	31
Day 6	16th	6	2	8	16
Day 7	17th	9	12	8	29
Day 8	18th	4	3	8	15
Day 9	19th	6	3	6	15
Day 10	20th	6	2	6	14
Day 11	21st	6	5	10	21
Day 12	22nd	0	0	0	0
Total		59	50	81	190

=== Medallists ===
Medal	Name	Sport	Event	Date
Gold	Cheng Chu Sian	Archery	Men's individual recurve	15 Nov
Gold	Cheng Chu Sian; Haziq Kamaruddin; Khairul Anuar Mohamad	Archery	Men's team recurve	17 Nov
Gold	Kannathasan Subramaniam; Muhamad Yunus Lasaleh; Schzuan Rosely; Yuvaraj Panerselvam	Athletics	Men's 4 × 400 metres relay	14 Nov
Gold	Lo Choon Sieng	Athletics	Men's 20 kilometres road walk	13 Nov
Gold	Lee Hup Wei	Athletics	Men's high jump	14 Nov
Gold	Noraseela Mohd Khalid	Athletics	Women's 400 metres hurdles	15 Nov
Gold	Roslinda Samsu	Athletics	Women's pole vault	15 Nov
Gold	Tan Song Hwa	Athletics	Women's hammer throw	12 Nov
Gold	Chong Tin Sam; Thor Chuan Leong	Billiards and snooker	Men's snooker doubles	16 Nov
Gold	Adrian Ang; Alex Liew	Bowling	Men's doubles	16 Nov
Gold	Adrian Ang; Alex Liew; Zulmazran Zulkifli	Bowling	Men's trios	17 Nov
Gold	Aaron Kong; Adrian Ang; Alex Liew; Muhammad Nur Aiman; Muhammad Syafiq Ridhwan; Zulmazran Zulkifli	Bowling	Men's team of five	18 Nov
Gold	Adrian Ang	Bowling	Men's masters	20 Nov
Gold	Jacqueline Jenelee Sijore; Zandra Aziela Ibrahim	Bowling	Women's doubles	16 Nov
Gold	Muhammad Edrus Md Yunos	Cycling	Men's individual sprint	21 Nov
Gold	Mohd Harrif Saleh	Cycling	Men's 10 kilometres scratch race	19 Nov
Gold	Mohamad Hafiz Mohd Sufian	Cycling	Men's omnium	21 Nov
Gold	Adiq Husainie Othman; Amir Mustafa Rusli; Mohammad Akmal Amrun; Mohd Harrif Saleh	Cycling	Men's 4 kilometres team pursuit	20 Nov
Gold	Fatehah Mustapa	Cycling	Women's 500 metres time trial	19 Nov
Gold	Fatehah Mustapa	Cycling	Women's individual sprint	21 Nov
Gold	Fatehah Mustapa; Jupha Somnet	Cycling	Women's team sprint	21 Nov
Gold	Yeoh Ken Nee	Diving	Men's 3 metre springboard	16 Nov
Gold	Bryan Nickson Lomas	Diving	Men's 10 metre platform	15 Nov
Gold	Bryan Nickson Lomas; Yeoh Ken Nee	Diving	Men's synchronised 3 metre springboard	14 Nov
Gold	Cheong Jun Hoong	Diving	Women's 3 metre springboard	15 Nov
Gold	Pandelela Rinong	Diving	Women's 10 metre platform	16 Nov
Gold	Leong Mun Yee; Ng Yan Yee	Diving	Women's synchronised 3 metre springboard	13 Nov
Gold	Leong Mun Yee; Traisy Vivien Tukiet	Diving	Women's synchronised 10 metre platform	14 Nov
Gold	Joshua Koh I Jie	Fencing	Men's individual épée	13 Nov
Gold	Liong Ming Chang; Nurul Ariezzat Nazreen Ismail; Muhammad Radhi Hashim; Yu Peng Kean	Fencing	Men's team sabre	18 Nov
Gold	Malaysia national under-23 football team: Khairul Fahmi Che Mat; Mahali Jasuli; Mohd Zubir Azmi; Mohd Fadhli Mohd Shas; Mohd Asraruddin Putra Omar; Mohd Irfan Fazail; Abdul Shukur Jusoh; Thamil Arasu Ambumamee; Baddrol Bakhtiar; Kandasamy Gurusamy; Ahmad Fakri Saarani; Izzaq Faris Ramlan; Mohd Amer Saidin; Mohd Fandi Othman; Syahrul Azwari Ibrahim; Wan Zaharulnizam Zakaria; Mohd Izham Tarmizi; Muhamad Nazmi Faiz Mansor; Mohd Muslim Ahmad; Yong Kuong Yong	Football	Men's tournament	21 Nov
Gold	Loganeshaa Rao Ramarow	Karate	Men's kumite 55 kg	13 Nov
Gold	Shaharudin Jamaludin	Karate	Men's kumite 75 kg	13 Nov
Gold	Teagajaran Kunasarakan	Karate	Men's kumite 84 kg	13 Nov
Gold	Yamini Gopalasamy	Karate	Women's kumite 61 kg	13 Nov
Gold	Heidi Gan	Open water swimming	Women's 5000 metre	17 Nov
Gold	Heidi Gan	Open water swimming	Women's 10000 metre	19 Nov
Gold	Ahmad Shahril Zailudin	Pencak silat	Men's 65 kg	17 Nov
Gold	Mohd Al Jufferi Jamari	Pencak silat	Men's 70 kg	17 Nov
Gold	Mohd Fauzi Khalid	Pencak silat	Men's 75 kg	17 Nov
Gold	Nur Suryani Taibi	Shooting	Women's 10 metre air rifle	15 Nov
Gold	Nur Suryani Taibi	Shooting	Women's 50 metre rifle three positions	12 Nov
Gold	Kevin Yeap Soon Choy	Swimming	Men's 400 metre freestyle	15 Nov
Gold	Khoo Cai Lin	Swimming	Women's 800 metre freestyle	15 Nov
Gold	Christina Loh Yen Ling	Swimming	Women's 50 metre breaststroke	17 Nov
Gold	Siow Yi Ting	Swimming	Women's 100 metre breaststroke	15 Nov
Gold	Siow Yi Ting	Swimming	Women's 200 metre breaststroke	16 Nov
Gold	Katrina Ann Abdul Hadi; Shareen Png Hui Chuen	Synchronized swimming	Women's technical routine duet	19 Nov
Gold	Katrina Ann Abdul Hadi; Shareen Png Hui Chuen	Synchronized swimming	Women's free routine duet	20 Nov
Gold	Emanuelle Mah Thil Da; Katrina Ann Abdul Hadi; Mandy Yeap Mun Xin; Shareen Png Hui Chuen; Tan May Mei; Yeo Pei Ling; Zyanne Lee Zhien Huey; Zylane Lee Yhing Huey	Synchronized swimming	Women's free routine team	20 Nov
Gold	Emanuelle Mah Thil Da; Katrina Ann Abdul Hadi; Mandy Yeap Mun Xin; Shareen Png Hui Chuen; Tan May Mei; Yeo Pei Ling; Zyanne Lee Zhien Huey; Zylane Lee Yhing Huey	Synchronized swimming	Women's technical routine team	19 Nov
Gold	Emanuelle Mah Thil Da; Gan Zhen Yu; Katrina Ann Abdul Hadi; Mandy Yeap Mun Xin; Shareen Png Hui Chuen; Tan May Mei; Tasha Jane Taher Ali; Yeo Pei Ling; Zylane Lee Yhing Huey; Zyanne Lee Zhien Huey	Synchronized swimming	Women's free combination team	21 Nov
Gold	Alex Yoong	Waterskiing	Men's overall	18 Nov
Gold	Philippa Clare	Waterskiing	Women's slalom	17 Nov
Gold	Aaliyah Yoong	Waterskiing	Women's trick	17 Nov
Gold	Philippa Clare	Waterskiing	Women's overall	18 nov
Gold	Kevan Cheah Peng Heng	Wushu	Men's nandao and nangun	20 Nov
Gold	Lee Yang	Wushu	Men's taijiquan and taijijian	19 Nov
Gold	Tai Cheau Xuen	Wushu	Women's nandao and nangun	20 Nov
Silver	Khairul Anuar Mohamad	Archery	Men's individual recurve	15 Nov
Silver	Kelvin Hoo Kok Meng; Mohd Kaharuddin Ashah; Muhammad Zaki Mahazan	Archery	Men's team compound	17 Nov
Silver	Fatin Nurfatehah Mat Salleh; Norhayati Al-Madihah Hashim; Nor Rizah Ishak	Archery	Women's team compound	17 Nov
Silver	Cheng Chu Sian; Fairuz Rahim; Nurul Syafiqah Hashim	Archery	Mixed team recurve	18 Nov
Silver	Cheng Chu Sian; Fatin Nurfatehah Mat Salleh; Muhammad Zaki Mahazan	Archery	Mixed team compound	18 Nov
Silver	Rayzam Shah Wan Sofian	Athletics	Men's 110 metres hurdles	13 Nov
Silver	Adi Aliffuddin Hussin	Athletics	Men's shot put	13 Nov
Silver	Malaysia national badminton team: Chong Wei Feng; Goh V Shem; Liew Daren; Lim Khim Wah; Mak Hee Chun; Mohammad Arif Abdul Latif; Ong Soon Hock	Badminton	Men's team	15 Nov
Silver	Aaron Kong; Muhammad Nur Aiman; Muhammad Syafiq Ridhwan	Bowling	Men's trios	17 Nov
Silver	Sin Li Jane	Bowling	Women's singles	15 Nov
Silver	Sharon Koh	Bowling	Women's masters	20 Nov
Silver	Mohammad Farkhan Mohd Haron	Boxing	Men's middleweight (75 kg)	21 Nov
Silver	Mohd Fattah Amri Zaid	Cycling	Men's individual sprint	21 Nov
Silver	Adiq Husainie Othman	Cycling	Men's 40 kilometres points race	21 Nov
Silver	Masziyaton Mohd Radzi	Cycling	Women's cross country	13 Nov
Silver	Ooi Tze Liang	Diving	Men's 10 metre platform	15 Nov
Silver	Ng Yan Yee	Diving	Women's 3 metre springboard	15 Nov
Silver	Kam Ling Kar	Diving	Women's 10 metre platform	16 Nov
Silver	Nur Eli Ellina Azmi	Gymnastics	Women's balance beam	15 Nov
Silver	Farah Ann Abdul Hadi	Gymnastics	Women's uneven bars	15 Nov
Silver	Celine Lee Xin Yi; Khaw Yee Voon; Thor Chee Yee	Karate	Women's team kata	12 Nov
Silver	Jamalliah Jamaluddin; Shakkila Sani Jefry; Yamini Gopalasamy	Karate	Women's team kumite	14 Nov
Silver	Abdul Rahman; Mohd Khairul Kamaruddin; M. Faridil Fadzreen; Maramizal Omar; Nasaruddin A. Bakar	Paragliding	Men's race to goal team	21 Nov
Silver	Asjanita Aini; Asmawati Ahmad; Nur Shaziylia Sahar; Nur Shazlisha Sahar; Tan Seng Jiu	Paragliding	Women's open-distance team	21 Nov
Silver	Siti Rahmah Mohamed Nasir	Pencak silat	Women's 70 kg	17 Nov
Silver	Mohd Romzi Muhamad	Sailing	Men's laser radial	19 Nov
Silver	Mohd Hadafi Jaafar	Shooting	Men's 10 metre air rifle	12 Nov
Silver	Khalel Abdullah	Shooting	Men's 25 metre standard pistol	12 Nov
Silver	Hasli Izwan Amir Hasan	Shooting	Men's 25 metre rapid pistol	13 Nov
Silver	Shahril Sahak	Shooting	Men's 50 metre rifle prone	13 Nov
Silver	Kevin Yeap Soon Choy	Swimming	Men's 1500 metre freestyle	17 Nov
Silver	Foo Jian Beng; Kevin Yeap Soon Choy; Lim Ching Hwang; Vernon Lee Jeau Zhi	Swimming	Men's 4 × 200 metre freestyle relay	16 Nov
Silver	Khoo Cai Lin	Swimming	Women's 400 metre freestyle	14 Nov
Silver	Chan Kah Yan	Swimming	Women's 50 metre backstroke	14 Nov
Silver	Siow Yi Ting	Swimming	Women's 50 metre breaststroke	17 Nov
Silver	Christina Loh Yen Ling	Swimming	Women's 100 metre breaststroke	15 Nov
Silver	Marellyn Liew	Swimming	Women's 50 metre butterfly	17 Nov
Silver	Marellyn Liew	Swimming	Women's 100 metre butterfly	12 Nov
Silver	Siow Yi Ting	Swimming	Women's 200 metre individual medley	17 Nov
Silver	Chan Kah Yan; Christina Loh Yen Ling; Khoo Cai Lin; Marellyn Liew	Swimming	Women's 4 × 100 metre medley relay	12 Nov
Silver	Rusfredy Tokan Petrus	Taekwondo	Men's bantamweight (58-63 kg)	15 Nov
Silver	Nurul Asfahlina Mohamed Johari	Taekwondo	Men's finweight (under 46 kg)	14 Nov
Silver	Khairul Hafiz; Mohd Redha Rozlan; Jonathan Hwa Soong Yi	Wall climbing	Men's speed relays	17 Nov
Silver	Alex Yoong	Waterskiing	Men's jumping	17 Nov
Silver	Alex Yoong	Waterskiing	Men's slalom	17 Nov
Silver	Philippa Clare	Waterskiing	Women's jumping	17 Nov
Silver	Abdul Azim Najmi Abdul Rashid	Weightlifting	Men's +105 kg	19 Nov
Silver	Koo Chee Zhong	Wushu	Men's nandao and nangun	20 Nov
Silver	Tai Cheau Xuen	Wushu	Women's nanquan	18 Nov
Silver	Ng Shin Yii	Wushu	Women's taijiquan and taijijian	19 Nov
Bronze	Muhammad Zaki Mahazan	Archery	Men's individual compound	16 Nov
Bronze	Mohd Robani Hassan	Athletics	Men's 110 metres hurdles	13 Nov
Bronze	Mohd Azhar Ismail; Mohd Ikhwan Nor; Mohd Noor Imran Abdul Hadi; Mohd Zabidi Ghazali	Athletics	Men's 4 × 100 metres relay	15 Nov
Bronze	Jackie Wong Siew Cheer	Athletics	Men's hammer throw	14 Nov
Bronze	Goh V Shem; Lim Khim Wah	Badminton	Men's doubles	18 Nov
Bronze	Malaysia national badminton team: Lim Yin Loo; Lydia Cheah Li Ya; Marylen Ng; Sonia Cheah Su Ya; Tee Jing Yi; Vivian Hoo Kah Mun; Woon Khe Wei	Badminton	Women's team	13 Nov
Bronze	Malaysia national basketball team: Ang Siew Teng; Choo Sook Ping; Eugene Ting Chiao; Goh Beng Fong; Hee Shook Ying; Kalaimathi Rajinti; Kew Suik May; Lee Siew Fun; Nur Izzati Yaakob; Pang Hui Pin; Saw Wei Yin; Teo Woon Yuen; Yap Ching Yee; Yong Shin Min	Basketball	Women's tournament	20 Nov
Bronze	Thor Chuan Leong	Billiards and snooker	Men's snooker singles	18 Nov
Bronze	Adrian Ang	Bowling	Men's singles	15 Nov
Bronze	Muhammad Syafiq Ridhwan; Zulmazran Zulkifli	Bowling	Men's doubles	16 Nov
Bronze	Muhammad Syafiq Ridhwan	Bowling	Men's masters	20 Nov
Bronze	Dayang Khairuniza Dhiyana; Sharon Koh	Bowling	Women's doubles	16 Nov
Bronze	Dayang Khairuniza Dhiyana; Jacqueline Jenelee Sijore; Sharon Koh; Sin Li Jane; Zandra Aziela Ibrahim; Zatil Iman Abdul Ghani	Bowling	Women's team of five	18 Nov
Bronze	Zandra Aziela Ibrahim	Bowling	Women's masters	20 Nov
Bronze	Khir Akyazlan Azmi	Boxing	Men's light welterweight (64 kg)	21 Nov
Bronze	Mohd Fairus Azwan Abdullah	Boxing	Men's light heavyweight (81 kg)	21 Nov
Bronze	Lee Ai Jin	Boxing	Women's light flyweight (48 kg)	18 Nov
Bronze	Hamdan Mohammad; Mohd Parmi	Canoeing	Men's K-2 200 metres	13 Nov
Bronze	Lim Yee Weng; Nur Najiha Hisham	Chess	Mixed doubles standard class	16 Nov
Bronze	Ahmad Fakhrullah Alias	Cycling	Men's omnium	21 Nov
Bronze	Ahmad Amsyar Azman	Diving	Men's 3 metre springboard	16 Nov
Bronze	Sharmini Christina; Natasha Ines; Muhammad Nabil Fikri; Nurlin Mohd Saleh	Equestrian	Mixed team show jumping	19 Nov
Bronze	Yu Peng Kean	Fencing	Men's individual sabre	15 Nov
Bronze	Noor Iskandar Tauran	Fencing	Men's individual foil	14 Nov
Bronze	Sabri Nullah; Junaidi Bardin; Mohd Noor Iskandar	Fencing	Men's team foil	17 Nov
Bronze	Joshua Koh I Jie; Hasmie Sohaini; Noor Nashriq Adli Noor Jali	Fencing	Men's team épée	16 Nov
Bronze	Natasha Ezzra Abu Bakar	Fencing	Women's individual foil	15 Nov
Bronze	Low Khai Jei; Kenneth De Silva; Arie Fauzi; Abel Tam Kwang Yuan	Golf	Men's team	17 Nov
Bronze	Nur Durriyah; Kelly Tan Guat Chen; Aretha Pan Herng	Golf	Women's team	17 Nov
Bronze	Marjan Abdullah	Judo	Men's 81 kg	18 Nov
Bronze	Mohamed Ezzat Mohamed Noor	Judo	Men's 90 kg	20 Nov
Bronze	Nik Nor Baizura Nik Azman	Judo	Women's 63 kg	19 Nov
Bronze	Leong Tze Wai	Karate	Men's individual kata	12 Nov
Bronze	Kam Kah Sam; Leong Tze Wai; Lim Chee Wei	Karate	Men's team kata	12 Nov
Bronze	Kunasilan Lakanathan	Karate	Men's kumite 67 kg	13 Nov
Bronze	Kunasilan Lakanathan; Uriel Yu En French; Poovanesvaran Kanesan	Karate	Men's team kumite	14 Nov
Bronze	Thor Chee Yee	Karate	Women's individual kata	12 Nov
Bronze	Nisha Alagashan	Karate	Women's kumite 55 kg	13 Nov
Bronze	Syakilla Salni Jefry Krishnan	Karate	Women's kumite 68 kg	13 Nov
Bronze	Jamalliah Jamaluddin	Karate	Women's kumite +68 kg	12 Nov
Bronze	Kevin Yeap Soon Choy	Open water swimming	Men's 10,000 metre	19 Nov
Bronze	Abdul Rahman Baharin; Mohd Khairul Kamaruddin; Muhamad Faridil Fadzreen Nordin; Marazmizal Omar; Nasaruddin A. Bakar	Paragliding	Men's accuracy team	21 Nov
Bronze	Abdul Rahman Baharin; Mohd Khairul Kamaruddin; Muhamad Faridil Fadzreen Nordin; Marazmizal Omar; Nasaruddin A. Bakar	Paragliding	Men's open-distance team	21 Nov
Bronze	Asjanita Aini Abu Hassan; Asmawati Ahmad; Nur Shaziylia Sahar; Nur Shazlisha Sahar; Tan Seng Jiu	Paragliding	Women's accuracy team	21 Nov
Bronze	Asjanita Aini Abu Hassan; Asmawati Ahmad; Nur Shaziylia Sahar; Nur Shazlisha Sahar; Tan Seng Jiu	Paragliding	Women's race to goal team	21 Nov
Bronze	Mohd Tajul Zaman Tajuddin	Pencak silat	Men's artistic singles	15 Nov
Bronze	Kamilah Sulong; Siti Arfiyah Abd Jalil	Pencak silat	Women's artistic doubles	15 Nov
Bronze	Mohd Hafiz Mahari	Pencak silat	Men's 50 kg	15 Nov
Bronze	Azrul Abdullah	Pencak silat	Men's 90 kg	15 Nov
Bronze	Noor Farahana Ismail	Pencak silat	Women's 55 kg	15 Nov
Bronze	Mastura Sapuan	Pencak silat	Women's 65 kg	15 Nov
Bronze	Siti Khadijah Hassan	Pencak silat	Women's 75 kg	15 Nov
Bronze	Ahmad Safwan Ibrahim	Pétanque	Men's singles	13 Nov
Bronze	Mohd Hakem Ahmed Saberi; Mohd Hafizuddin Mat Daud	Pétanque	Men's doubles	15 Nov
Bronze	Mohd Faizal Mohamad	Pétanque	Men's shooting	17 Nov
Bronze	Suhartisera Zamri	Pétanque	Women's singles	13 Nov
Bronze	Akidah Aziah Ramly; Lai Yi Zhao; Lim Carlyle	Roller sports	Women's 3000 metres relays	13 Nov
Bronze	Ahmad Huzaifah; Muhammad Aliff Abd Halid	Rowing	Men's coxless pairs	17 Nov
Bronze	Ku Anas Ku Zamil; Mohamad Hafizzudin Mazelan	Sailing	Men's international 470	19 Nov
Bronze	Nur Amirah Hamid	Sailing	Women's laser radial	19 Nov
Bronze	Ahmad Syukri Abdul Aziz	Sailing	Mixed optimist	19 Nov
Bronze	Muhammad Syazwan Husin; Norsharuddin Mad Ghani; Farhan Adam; Fazil Mohd Asri; Mohamad Fadzli Roslan	Sepak takraw	Men's regu	14 Nov
Bronze	Muhammad Syazwan Husin; Norsharuddin Mad Ghani; Farhan Adam; Fazil Mohd Asri; Mohamad Fadzli Roslan	Sepak takraw	Men's team	18 Nov
Bronze	Mohd Hadafi Jaafar	Shooting	Men's 50 metre rifle prone three positions	16 Nov
Bronze	Nur Ayuni Farhana Abdul Halim	Shooting	Women's 50 metre rifle three positions	12 Nov
Bronze	Muslifah Zulkifli	Shooting	Women's 50 metre rifle prone	14 Nov
Bronze	Ian James Barr	Swimming	Men's 200 metre individual medley	17 Nov
Bronze	Foo Jian Beng; Ian James Barr; Tern Jian Han; Yap See Tuan	Swimming	Men's 4 × 100 medley relay	17 Nov
Bronze	Chan Kah Yan; Khoo Cai Lin; Leung Chii Lin; Siow Yi Ting	Swimming	Women's 4 × 100 freestyle relay	15 Nov
Bronze	Ahmady Rady; Morren Urai Lian	Taekwondo	Mixed pair poomsae	12 Nov
Bronze	Afifuddin Omar Sidek	Taekwondo	Men's featherweight (63-68 kg)	13 Nov
Bronze	Hafzanizam Bakhori	Wall climbing	Men's boulder	12 Nov
Bronze	Zul Fadzli Shafiee	Wall climbing	Men's lead	16 Nov
Bronze	Philippa Clare	Waterskiing	Women's trick	17 Nov
Bronze	Malaysia national water polo team: Aileen Lim Zhi Xiang; Chan Su Jie; Chong Yi Ling; Debbie Ng; Hay Yan Xiang; Low Jia Yee; Low Sheen Yee; Samantha Keo; Selene Chew; Shirinnah Lim; Shirleen Khoo; Woo Yi Wen; Yap Yee Chuin	Water polo	Women's tournament	12 Nov
Bronze	Firdaus Abdul Razak	Weightlifting	Men's 105 kg	18 Nov
Bronze	Nur Jannah Batrisyah	Weightlifting	Women's +69 kg	21 Nov
Bronze	Kevan Cheah Peng Heng	Wushu	Men's nanquan	18 Nov
Bronze	Ong Shi Chuan	Wushu	Men's daoshu and gunshu	20 Nov
Bronze	Wong Wei Jian	Wushu	Men's sanshou 70 kg	21 Nov
Bronze	Diana Bong Siong Lin	Wushu	Women's nandao and nangun	20 Nov
Bronze	Tang Pei Pin	Wushu	Women's sanshou 60 kg	21 Nov

== Aquatics ==
=== Diving ===
Men

Athlete	Event	Preliminary		Final	
Athlete	Event	Score	Rank	Score	Rank
Ahmad Amsyar Azman	3 m springboard	—N/a		397.30	3rd place, bronze medalist(s)
Yeoh Ken Nee	3 m springboard	—N/a		458.15	1st place, gold medalist(s)
Bryan Nickson Lomas	10 m platform	—N/a		500.80	1st place, gold medalist(s)
Ooi Tze Liang	10 m platform	—N/a		445.25	2nd place, silver medalist(s)
Bryan Nickson Lomas; Yeoh Ken Nee	3 m synchronized springboard	—N/a		392.31	1st place, gold medalist(s)

Women

Athlete	Event	Preliminary		Final	
Athlete	Event	Score	Rank	Score	Rank
Cheong Jun Hoong	3 m springboard	—N/a		310.70	1st place, gold medalist(s)
Ng Yan Yee	3 m springboard	—N/a		290.10	2nd place, silver medalist(s)
Kam Ling Kar	10 m platform	—N/a		260.85	2nd place, silver medalist(s)
Pandelela Rinong	10 m platform	—N/a		342.90	1st place, gold medalist(s)
Leong Mun Yee; Ng Yan Yee	3 m synchronized springboard	—N/a		296.10	1st place, gold medalist(s)
Leong Mun Yee; Traisy Vivien Tukiet	10 m synchronized platform	—N/a		306.66	1st place, gold medalist(s)

=== Swimming ===
Men

Athlete	Event	Heats		Final	
Athlete	Event	Time	Overall rank	Time	Rank
Kevin Yeap Soon Choy	400 m freestyle			3:55.07	1st place, gold medalist(s)
Kevin Yeap Soon Choy	1500 m freestyle	—N/a		15:53.79	2nd place, silver medalist(s)
Ian James Barr	200 m individual medley			2:06.96	3rd place, bronze medalist(s)
Foo Jian Beng; Kevin Yeap Soon Choy; Lim Ching Hwang; Vernon Lee Jeau Zhi	4 × 200 m freestyle relay	—N/a		7:35.99	2nd place, silver medalist(s)
Foo Jian Beng; Ian James Barr; Tern Jian Han; Yap See Tuan	4 × 100 m medley relay	—N/a		3:51.65	3rd place, bronze medalist(s)

Women

Athlete	Event	Heats		Final	
Athlete	Event	Time	Overall rank	Time	Rank
Khoo Cai Lin	400 m freestyle			4:16.54	2nd place, silver medalist(s)
Khoo Cai Lin	800 m freestyle	—N/a		8:50.17	1st place, gold medalist(s)
Chan Kah Yan	50 m backstroke			29.55 NR	2nd place, silver medalist(s)
Christina Loh Yen Ling	50 m breaststroke			32.49 GR	1st place, gold medalist(s)
Siow Yi Ting	50 m breaststroke			32.81	2nd place, silver medalist(s)
Christina Loh Yen Ling	100 m breaststroke			1:10.57	2nd place, silver medalist(s)
Siow Yi Ting	100 m breaststroke			1:10.55	1st place, gold medalist(s)
Siow Yi Ting	200 m breaststroke			2:33.67	1st place, gold medalist(s)
Marellyn Liew	50 m butterfly			27.63	2nd place, silver medalist(s)
Marellyn Liew	100 m butterfly			1:01.92	2nd place, silver medalist(s)
Siow Yi Ting	200 m individual medley			2:20.11	2nd place, silver medalist(s)
Chan Kah Yan; Khoo Cai Lin; Leung Chii Lin; Siow Yi Ting	4 × 100 m freestyle relay	—N/a		3:53.27	3rd place, bronze medalist(s)
Chan Kah Yan; Christina Loh Yen Ling; Khoo Cai Lin; Marellyn Liew	4 × 100 m medley relay	—N/a		4:15.02	2nd place, silver medalist(s)

== Baseball ==
=== Men's tournament ===
Preliminary round

Qualified to the gold medal game
Qualified to the bronze medal game

Team	Pld	W	L	GF	GA	GD	Pts
Philippines	4	4	0	33	2	+31	8
Indonesia	4	3	1	34	9	+25	7
Thailand	4	2	2	35	14	+21	6
Vietnam	4	1	3	4	50	−44	5
Malaysia	4	0	4	10	40	−31	4

- First game is at 10:00, and the second game is at 14:30, UTC+7.

Team	1	2	3	4	5	6	7	R	H	E
Malaysia	0	0	0	0	0	0	0	0	0	5
Indonesia	6	1	0	3	4	0	0	14	8	5

Team	1	2	3	4	5	6	7	R	H	E
Malaysia	0	0	0	0	0	0	0	0	0	0
Philippines	2	2	0	0	2	0	0	10	9	0

Team	1	2	3	4	5	R	H	E
Thailand	2	7	0	4	3	16	7	1
Malaysia	0	0	0	0	0	0	1	1

Team	1	2	3	4	5	6	7	8	9	R	H	E
Vietnam	0	0	2	4	2	0	1	1	0	10	6	3
Malaysia	1	3	0	0	0	0	1	1	0	4	6	3

== Basketball ==
=== Men's tournament ===
Group B

Team	Pld	W	L	PF	PA	PD	Pts
Indonesia	3	3	0	223	165	+58	6
Malaysia	3	2	1	212	190	+22	5
Singapore	3	1	2	225	221	+4	4
Myanmar	3	0	3	191	275	−84	3

14 November
17:00

Report

Singapore	59–67	Malaysia
Scoring by quarter: 17-19, 14-12, 16-19, 12-17
Pts: Wong W.L. 17; Rebs: Matialakan 9 Asts: Oh 6		Pts: Guganeswaran 18; Rebs: Guganeswaran 5 Asts: Ooi B.S. 4

Kelapa Gading Sports Mall, Jakarta
Referees: Yuji Higashi, Ricor Buaron, Viet Duc Le

15 November
19:00

Report

Malaysia	45–59	Indonesia
Scoring by quarter: 9-15, 8-24, 16-9, 12-11
Pts: Wong C.H. 12; Rebs: Ooi B.S. 9 Asts: 4 players 1		Pts: Prihantono 12; Rebs: Poedjakesuma 11; Asts: Wuysang 5

Kelapa Gading Sports Mall, Jakarta
Referees: Jamal Al Turk, Atanu Banerjee, Ricor Buaron

16 November
17:00

Report

Malaysia	100–72	Myanmar
Scoring by quarter: 24-16, 25-20, 30-18, 21-18
Pts: Wee C.C. 20; Rebs: Ng 9 Asts: Wee C.C. 6		Pts: Gyi 20; Rebs: Phay 9 Asts: Gyi 2

Kelapa Gading Sports Mall, Jakarta
Referees: Jamal Al Turk, Glenn Cornelio, Viet Duc Le

Semifinal

18 November
15:00

Report

Philippines	103–74	Malaysia
Scoring by quarter: 23-19, 22-21, 29-19, 30-15
Pts: Slaughter 16; Rebs: Garcia 6 Asts: Tiu 6		Pts: Guganeswaran 24; Rebs: Kwaan Y.J. 7 Asts: Ooi B.S. 3

Kelapa Gading Sports Mall, Jakarta
Referees: Cheuk Fai Lau, Yuji Higashi, Poh Seng Goh

Bronze medal match

20 November
17:00

Report

Malaysia	54–78	Indonesia
Scoring by quarter: 12-25, 18-14, 18-22, 6-17
Pts: Chee L.W. 14; Rebs: Loh S.F., Kwaan Y.J. 5 Asts: Wee C.C., Chee L.W. 2		Pts: Gunawan 16; Rebs: Gunawan 14; Asts: Prihantono 4

Kelapa Gading Sports Mall, Jakarta
Referees: Yuji Higashi, Cheuk Fai Lau, Ricor Buaron

=== Women's tournament ===
All times are Western Indonesian Time (WIB) – UTC+7.

Team	Pld	W	L	PF	PA	PD	Pts	Tie
Thailand	4	3	1	280	265	+15	7	1–0
Philippines	4	3	1	267	238	+29	7	0–1
Malaysia	4	2	2	259	238	+21	6	1–0
Myanmar	4	2	2	254	279	−25	6	0–1
Indonesia	4	0	4	250	290	−40	4	

14 November
13:00

Report

Malaysia	56–64	Philippines
Scoring by quarter: 6-21, 22-15, 10-15, 18-13
Pts: Rajintiran 12; Rebs: Pang H.P., Rajintiran 5 Asts: Teo W.Y., Kew S.M. 2		Pts: Arayi 16; Rebs: Arayi 13; Asts: Arayi 5

Kelapa Gading Sports Mall, Jakarta
Referees: Ling Peng, Yoko Tomita, Poh Seng Goh

15 November
11:00

Report

Myanmar	52–74	Malaysia
Scoring by quarter: 15-11, 18-20, 6-17, 13-26
Pts: Susie 22; Rebs: Yee 11; Asts: Wine 6		Pts: Rajintiran 19; Rebs: Kew S.M. 9 Asts: Yong S.M. 6

Kelapa Gading Sports Mall, Jakarta
Referees: Ling Peng, Ibnu Susilo, Watcharin Padungratchadakit

16 November
15:00

Report

Malaysia	59–74	Thailand
Scoring by quarter: 16-13, 13-15, 22-25, 8-21
Pts: Goh B.F. 18; Rebs: Pang H.P. 4 Asts: Pang H.P., Lee S.F. 2		Pts: Jantakan, Banmoo 18; Rebs: Banmoo 9 Asts: Jantakan 7

Kelapa Gading Sports Mall, Jakarta
Referees: Si Man Lei, Ling Peng, Poh Seng Goh

18 November
17:00

Report

Indonesia	48–70	Malaysia
Scoring by quarter: 10-17, 17-10, 15-19, 6-24
Pts: Ningrum 12; Rebs: Ibo 12; Asts: Christaline 2		Pts: Pang H.P. 14; Rebs: Yap C.Y. 12; Asts: Yaakob 5

Kelapa Gading Sports Mall, Jakarta
Referees: Si Man Lei, Yoko Tomita, Watcharin Padungratchadakit

== Football ==
=== Men's tournament ===
Group A

In the last week of October 2011, the Football Association of Indonesia had rescheduled the first round of matches for the group twice, originally moving it forward to 8 November and eventually to 7 November. The second, third and fourth round of fixture had also been moved forward accordingly while the final round of fixtures remained on the 17th.

Team	Pld	W	D	L	GF	GA	GD	Pts
Malaysia	4	3	1	0	7	2	+5	10
Indonesia	4	3	0	1	11	2	+9	9
Singapore	4	2	1	1	4	3	+1	7
Thailand	4	1	0	3	6	7	−1	3
Cambodia	4	0	0	4	2	16	−14	0

7 November 2011
16:00

Singapore	0 – 0	Malaysia
	Report

Gelora Bung Karno Stadium, Jakarta
Referee: Chaiya Mahapab (Thailand)

9 November 2011
16:00

Malaysia	2 – 1	Thailand
Baddrol 24'; Izzaq 85'	Report	Thammarossopon 78'

Gelora Bung Karno Stadium, Jakarta
Referee: Minoru Tōjō (Japan)

13 November 2011
16:00

Malaysia	4 – 1	Cambodia
Izzaq 7'; Baddrol 36' (pen.), 39'; Wan 90'	Report	Chhoeun 61'

Gelora Bung Karno Stadium, Jakarta
Referee: Fahad Al-Kassar (United Arab Emirates)

17 November 2011
19:00

Indonesia	0 – 1	Malaysia
	Report	Syahrul 17'

Gelora Bung Karno Stadium, Jakarta
Referee: Fahad Al-Kassar (United Arab Emirates)

Semifinal

19 November 2011
16:00

Malaysia	1 – 0	Myanmar
Fakri 85'	Report

Gelora Bung Karno Stadium, Jakarta
Referee: Kao Jung-Fang (Chinese Taipei)

Gold medal match

21 November 2011
19:30

Malaysia	1 – 1 (a.e.t.)	Indonesia
Asraruddin 35'	Report	Gunawan 5'
Penalties
Mahali (penalty scored); Fandi (penalty scored); Fakri (penalty missed); Fadhli (penalty scored); Baddrol (penalty scored)	4 – 3	(penalty scored) Bonai; (penalty missed) Gunawan; (penalty scored) Egi; (penalty scored) Rahman; (penalty missed) Sinaga

Gelora Bung Karno Stadium, Jakarta
Referee: Minoru Tōjō (Japan)

Malaysia	Indonesia

GK	1	Khairul Fahmi Che Mat
RB	2	Mahali Jasuli
CB	3	Mohd Zubir Azmi
CB	4	Mohd Fadhli Mohd Shas
LB	6	Mohd Asraruddin Putra Omar		(substituted off) 99'
CM	24	Mohd Muslim Ahmad
CM	11	K. Gurusamy	(yellow card) 10'	(substituted off) 78'
RW	10	Baddrol Bakhtiar (c)	(yellow card) 21'
LW	7	Mohd Irfan Fazail
SS	13	Ahmad Fakri Saarani	(yellow card) 61'
CF	9	Thamil Arasu Ambumamee		(substituted off) 81'
Substitutions:
FW	21	Muhamad Nazmi Faiz Mansor		(substituted on) 78'
MF	16	Yong Kuong Yong	(yellow card) 113'	(substituted on) 81'
DF	17	Mohd Fandi Othman		(substituted on) 99'
Manager:
Ong Kim Swee

GK	1	Kurnia Meiga Hermansyah
RB	15	Hasyim Kipuw
CB	13	Gunawan Dwi Cahyo	(yellow card) 95'
CB	28	Abdul Rahman
LB	24	Diego Michiels
CM	6	Mahadirga Lasut		(substituted off) 71'
CM	8	Egi Melgiansyah (c)
RW	21	Andik Vermansyah	(yellow card) 34'	(substituted off) 66'
LW	10	Oktovianus Maniani	(yellow card) 60'
SS	25	Titus Bonai
CF	27	Patrich Wanggai		(substituted off) 97'
Substitutions:
FW	17	Ferdinand Sinaga	(yellow card) 120'	(substituted on) 66'
DF	26	Hendro Siswanto		(substituted on) 71'
MF	11	Rizky Ramdani Lestaluhu		(substituted on) 97'
Manager:
Rahmad Darmawan

== Indoor volleyball ==
=== Men's tournament ===
Preliminary round

Pos	Team	Pld	W	L	Pts	SW	SL	SR	SPW	SPL	SPR	Qualification
1	Thailand	5	5	0	15	15	2	7.500	411	351	1.171	Gold Medal match
2	Indonesia	5	4	1	12	12	6	2.000	410	353	1.161	Gold Medal match
3	Vietnam	5	3	2	9	11	8	1.375	423	412	1.027	
4	Myanmar	5	2	3	6	10	8	1.250	330	405	0.815	
5	Malaysia	5	1	4	3	5	13	0.385	428	300	1.427	
6	Cambodia	5	0	5	0	1	12	0.083	322	412	0.782	

	Score		Set 1	Set 2	Set 3	Set 4	Set 5
Vietnam	3–0	Malaysia	25-18	25-18	25-20		
Malaysia	1–3	Indonesia	26-24	16-25	21-25	22-25	
Thailand	3–0	Malaysia	26-24	25-16	26-24		
Myanmar	3–0	Malaysia	25-14	25-17	25-19		
Cambodia	1–3	Malaysia	23-25	27-25	23-25	29-31	
