= Sepak takraw at the 2011 SEA Games =

Sepak takraw at the 2011 SEA Games were held in Palembang, Indonesia.

== Medal summary ==
| Event | Gold | Silver | Bronze |
|---|---|---|---|
| Men's doubles | Indonesia (INA); Saiful Rijal; Yudi Purnomo; Nourizal | Myanmar (MYA); Si Thu Linn; Zaw Zaw Aung; Zaw Latt | Philippines (PHI) |
| Men's doubles | Indonesia (INA); Saiful Rijal; Yudi Purnomo; Nourizal | Myanmar (MYA); Si Thu Linn; Zaw Zaw Aung; Zaw Latt | Laos (LAO) |
| Men's regu | Thailand (THA); Pattarapong Yupade; Wirawut Na Nongkha; Pornchai Kaokaew; Anuwat Chaichana; Siriwat Sakha | Indonesia (INA); Syamsul Hadi; Saiful Rijal; Victor Eka Prasetyo; Abrian Sihab Aldil; Sudarmin | Malaysia (MAS) |
| Men's regu | Thailand (THA); Pattarapong Yupade; Wirawut Na Nongkha; Pornchai Kaokaew; Anuwat Chaichana; Siriwat Sakha | Indonesia (INA); Syamsul Hadi; Saiful Rijal; Victor Eka Prasetyo; Abrian Sihab Aldil; Sudarmin | Laos (LAO) |
| Men's team | Thailand (THA) | Indonesia (INA) | Malaysia (MAS) |
| Men's team | Thailand (THA) | Indonesia (INA) | Myanmar (MYA) |
| Women's doubles | Myanmar (MYA) | Laos (LAO) | Indonesia (INA) |
| Women's doubles | Myanmar (MYA) | Laos (LAO) | Vietnam (VIE) |
| Women's regu | Thailand (THA) | Vietnam (VIE) | Indonesia (INA) |
| Women's regu | Thailand (THA) | Vietnam (VIE) | Laos (LAO) |
| Women's team | Thailand (THA) | Indonesia (INA) | Myanmar (MYA) |

== Results ==
=== Men's Double Regu ===
==== Preliminary round ====
===== Group A =====
| Team | Pld | W | L | SF | SA | SD | Pts |
|---|---|---|---|---|---|---|---|
| Indonesia | 3 | 3 | 0 | 9 | 1 | 8 | 6 |
| Laos | 3 | 2 | 1 | 7 | 7 | 0 | 5 |
| Brunei | 3 | 1 | 2 | 5 | 6 | −1 | 4 |
| Vietnam | 3 | 0 | 3 | 2 | 9 | −7 | 3 |

| Date | Time | | Score | | Set 1 | Set 2 | Set 3 |
|---|---|---|---|---|---|---|---|
| 19 Nov | 09:00 | Vietnam | 2-3 | Laos | | | |
| 19 Nov | 13:00 | Indonesia | 3-0 | Brunei | | | |
| 19 Nov | 17:00 | Vietnam | 0-3 | Brunei | | | |
| 19 Nov | 21:00 | Laos | 1-3 | Indonesia | | | |
| 20 Nov | 09:00 | Vietnam | 0-3 | Indonesia | | | |
| 20 Nov | 09:00 | Brunei | 2-3 | Laos | | | |

===== Group B =====
| Team | Pld | W | L | SF | SA | SD | Pts |
|---|---|---|---|---|---|---|---|
| Myanmar | 2 | 2 | 0 | 6 | 0 | 6 | 4 |
| Philippines | 2 | 1 | 1 | 3 | 4 | −1 | 3 |
| Singapore | 2 | 0 | 2 | 1 | 6 | −5 | 2 |

| Date | Time | | Score | | Set 1 | Set 2 | Set 3 |
|---|---|---|---|---|---|---|---|
| 19 Nov | 09:00 | Myanmar | 3-0 | Philippines | | | |
| 19 Nov | 13:00 | Philippines | 3-1 | Singapore | | | |
| 19 Nov | 17:00 | Singapore | 0-3 | Myanmar | | | |

===== Knockout round =====
Semifinals
Indonesia | 15 | 15 | 15
Philippines | 10 | 9 | 9
Myanmar | 15 | 17 | 15
Laos | 6 | 16 | 9

Final
Indonesia | 15 | 9 | 11
Myanmar | 10 | 15 | 15

=== Men's Regu ===
==== Preliminary round ====
===== Group A =====
| Team | Pld | W | L | SF | SA | SD | Pts |
|---|---|---|---|---|---|---|---|
| Thailand | 3 | 3 | 0 | 9 | 2 | 7 | 6 |
| Indonesia | 3 | 2 | 1 | 8 | 5 | 3 | 5 |
| Brunei | 3 | 1 | 2 | 3 | 6 | −3 | 4 |
| Philippines | 3 | 0 | 3 | 0 | 7 | −7 | 3 |

| Date | Time | | Score | | Set 1 | Set 2 | Set 3 | Set 4 | Set 5 |
|---|---|---|---|---|---|---|---|---|---|
| 12 Nov | 10:00 | Indonesia | 3-0 | Philippines | | | | | |
| 12 Nov | 12:30 | Brunei | 3-0 | Philippines | | | | | |
| 12 Nov | 15:00 | Thailand | 3-0 | Brunei | 15-10 | 15-5 | 15-3 | | |
| 12 Nov | 17:30 | Thailand | 3-2 | Indonesia | 15-10 | 10-15 | 14-16 | 15-12 | 15-11 |
| 13 Nov | 09:00 | Thailand | 3-0 | Philippines | | | | | |
| 13 Nov | 11:30 | Brunei | 2-3 | Indonesia | 9-15 | 15-13 | 12-15 | 15-8 | 7-15 |

===== Group B =====
| Team | Pld | W | L | SF | SA | SD | Pts |
|---|---|---|---|---|---|---|---|
| Malaysia | 3 | 3 | 0 | 9 | 0 | 9 | 6 |
| Laos | 3 | 2 | 1 | 6 | 3 | 3 | 5 |
| Singapore | 3 | 1 | 2 | 3 | 6 | −3 | 4 |
| Vietnam | 3 | 0 | 3 | 0 | 9 | −9 | 3 |

| Date | Time | | Score | | Set 1 | Set 2 | Set 3 |
|---|---|---|---|---|---|---|---|
| 12 Nov | 10:00 | Laos | 3-0 | Vietnam | 15-10 | 15-9 | 15-10 |
| 12 Nov | 12:30 | Malaysia | 3-0 | Singapore | 15-9 | 15-8 | 15-8 |
| 12 Nov | 15:00 | Malaysia | 3-0 | Laos | 15-3 | 15-7 | 15-11 |
| 12 Nov | 17:30 | Singapore | 3-0 | Vietnam | 15-13 | 15-10 | 15-7 |
| 13 Nov | 09:00 | Laos | 3-0 | Singapore | 15-11 | 15-8 | 15-10 |
| 13 Nov | 11:30 | Malaysia | 3-0 | Vietnam | | | |

===== Knockout round =====
Semifinals
Thailand | 15 | 15 | 15
Laos | 11 | 9 | 5
Malaysia | 10 | 11 | 11
Indonesia | 15 | 15 | 15

Final
Thailand | 15 | 15 | 15
Indonesia | 6 | 7 | 5

=== Men's team ===
==== Preliminary round ====
| Team | Pld | W | L | SF | SA | SD | Pts |
|---|---|---|---|---|---|---|---|
| Thailand | 3 | 3 | 0 | 9 | 0 | 9 | 6 |
| Indonesia | 3 | 2 | 1 | 5 | 4 | 1 | 5 |
| Malaysia | 3 | 1 | 2 | 3 | 6 | −3 | 4 |
| Myanmar | 3 | 0 | 3 | 1 | 8 | −7 | 3 |

| Date | Time | | Score | | Set 1 | Set 2 | Set 3 |
|---|---|---|---|---|---|---|---|
| 15 Nov | 09:00 | Indonesia | 3-0 | Malaysia | | | |
| 15 Nov | 09:00 | Myanmar | 0-3 | Thailand | | | |
| 17 Nov | 09:00 | Indonesia | 2-1 | Myanmar | | | |
| 17 Nov | 09:00 | Thailand | 3-0 | Malaysia | | | |
| 18 Nov | 09:00 | Indonesia | 0-3 | Thailand | | | |
| 18 Nov | 09:00 | Malaysia | 3-0 | Myanmar | | | |

=== Women's Double Regu ===
==== Preliminary round ====
===== Group X =====
| Team | Pld | W | L | SF | SA | SD | Pts |
|---|---|---|---|---|---|---|---|
| Myanmar | 2 | 2 | 0 | 6 | 0 | 6 | 4 |
| Laos | 2 | 1 | 1 | 3 | 3 | 0 | 3 |
| Malaysia | 2 | 0 | 2 | 0 | 6 | −6 | 2 |

| Date | Time | | Score | | Set 1 | Set 2 | Set 3 |
|---|---|---|---|---|---|---|---|
| 19 Nov | 19:00 | Myanmar | 3-0 | Malaysia | | | |
| 19 Nov | 17:00 | Myanmar | 3-0 | Laos | | | |
| 19 Nov | 21:00 | Malaysia | 0-3 | Laos | | | |

===== Group Y =====
| Team | Pld | W | L | SF | SA | SD | Pts |
|---|---|---|---|---|---|---|---|
| Indonesia | 2 | 2 | 0 | 6 | 0 | 6 | 4 |
| Vietnam | 2 | 1 | 1 | 3 | 3 | 0 | 3 |
| Philippines | 2 | 0 | 2 | 0 | 6 | −6 | 2 |

| Date | Time | | Score | | Set 1 | Set 2 | Set 3 |
|---|---|---|---|---|---|---|---|
| 19 Nov | 13:00 | Indonesia | 3-0 | Philippines | | | |
| 19 Nov | 21:00 | Indonesia | 3-0 | Vietnam | | | |
| 20 Nov | 09:00 | Philippines | 0-3 | Vietnam | | | |

===== Knockout round =====
Semifinals
Myanmar | 15 | 9 | 15
Vietnam | 12 | 15 | 8
Indonesia | 13 | 12 | 15
Laos | 15 | 15 | 7

Final
Myanmar | 15 | 15 | 15
Laos | 5 | 6 | 10

=== Women's Regu ===
==== Preliminary round ====
===== Group X =====
| Team | Pld | W | L | SF | SA | SD | Pts |
|---|---|---|---|---|---|---|---|
| Thailand | 2 | 2 | 0 | 6 | 0 | 6 | 4 |
| Indonesia | 2 | 1 | 1 | 3 | 3 | 0 | 3 |
| Malaysia | 2 | 0 | 2 | 0 | 6 | −6 | 2 |

| Date | Time | | Score | | Set 1 | Set 2 | Set 3 |
|---|---|---|---|---|---|---|---|
| 12 Nov | 10:00 | Thailand | 3-0 | Indonesia | 17-15 | 15-5 | 15-8 |
| 12 Nov | 15:00 | Thailand | 3-0 | Malaysia | 15-10 | 15-6 | 15-6 |
| 13 Nov | 09:00 | Indonesia | 3-0 | Malaysia | 15-13 | 15-4 | 15-12 |

===== Group Y =====
| Team | Pld | W | L | SF | SA | SD | Pts |
|---|---|---|---|---|---|---|---|
| Vietnam | 2 | 2 | 0 | 6 | 1 | 5 | 4 |
| Philippines | 2 | 1 | 1 | 3 | 3 | 0 | 3 |
| Laos | 2 | 0 | 2 | 1 | 6 | −5 | 2 |

| Date | Time | | Score | | Set 1 | Set 2 | Set 3 | Set 4 |
|---|---|---|---|---|---|---|---|---|
| 12 Nov | 12:30 | Vietnam | 3-0 | Philippines | 15-9 | 15-6 | 16-14 | |
| 12 Nov | 17:30 | Vietnam | 3-1 | Laos | 15-9 | 15-11 | 12-15 | 17-15 |
| 13 Nov | 11:30 | Philippines | 3-0 | Laos | 15-8 | 15-2 | 15-8 | |

===== Knockout round =====
Semifinals
Thailand | 15 | 15 | 15
Laos | 6 | 11 | 10
Vietnam | 15 | 15 | 15
Indonesia | 10 | 10 | 3

Final
Thailand | 15 | 15 | 15
Vietnam | 13 | 10 | 13

=== Women's team ===
==== Preliminary round ====
| Team | Pld | W | L | SF | SA | SD | Pts |
|---|---|---|---|---|---|---|---|
| Thailand | 2 | 2 | 0 | 6 | 0 | 6 | 4 |
| Indonesia | 2 | 1 | 1 | 2 | 4 | −2 | 3 |
| Myanmar | 2 | 0 | 2 | 1 | 5 | −4 | 2 |

| Date | Time | | Score | | Set 1 | Set 2 | Set 3 |
|---|---|---|---|---|---|---|---|
| 15 Nov | 09:00 | Indonesia | 0-3 | Thailand | | | |
| 16 Nov | 09:00 | Indonesia | 2-1 | Myanmar | | | |
| 17 Nov | 09:00 | Thailand | 3-0 | Myanmar | | | |
