= Archery at the 2011 SEA Games =

- Venue: Senayan ABC Football Field
- Dates: 13–18 November 2011

Archery at the 26th SEA Games was held at Senayan ABC Football Field, Jakarta, Indonesia.

== Medal table ==
* Host nation (Indonesia)

Rank	Nation	Gold	Silver	Bronze	Total
1	Indonesia*	4	0	2	6
2	Myanmar	3	1	3	7
3	Malaysia	2	5	1	8
4	Philippines	1	2	0	3
5	Thailand	0	1	4	5
6	Vietnam	0	1	0	1
Totals (6 entries)		10	10	10	30

== Medal summary ==
=== Recurve ===
Event	Gold	Silver	Bronze
Men's individual	Cheng Chu Sian; Malaysia	Khairul Anuar Mohamad; Malaysia	Witthaya Thamwong; Thailand
Women's individual	Erwina Safitri; Indonesia	Thin Thin Khine; Myanmar	Pattheera Boonnark; Thailand
Men's team	Malaysia; Cheng Chu Sian; Khairul Anuar Mohamad; Haziq Kamaruddin	Thailand; Witthaya Thamwong; Khomkrit Duangsuwan; Denchai Thepna	Myanmar; Nay Myo Aung; Zaw Win Htike; Aung Myo Thu
Women's team	Indonesia; Erwina Safitri; Titi Kusumawardani; Nova Nuraini	Vietnam; Lộc Thị Đào; Đỗ Thị Hương; Dương Thị Kim Liên	Myanmar; Thin Thin Khine; San Yu Htwe; Tha Zin Aung
Mixed team	Indonesia; Erwina Safitri; Riau Ega Agatha; Alek Edwar	Malaysia; Nurul Syafiqah Hashim; Cheng Chu Sian; Fairuz binti SM Rahim	Thailand; Pattheera Boonnark; Witthaya Thamwong; Chanchai Pratheepwatanawong

=== Compound ===
Event	Gold	Silver	Bronze
Men's individual	I Gusti Nyoman Puruhito; Indonesia	Earl Benjamin Jacinto Yap; Philippines	Muhammad Zaki Mahazan; Malaysia
Women's individual	Aung Ngeain; Myanmar	Jennifer Dy Chan; Philippines	Lilies Heliarti; Indonesia
Men's team	Philippines; Earl Benjamin Jacinto Yap; Delfin Anthony Adr; Dondon	Malaysia; Muhammad Zaki Mahazan; Mohd Kaharuddin Ashah; Kelvin Hoo Kok Meng	Myanmar; Ye Min Swe; Aung Chaint Baw; Myat Zaw Htun
Women's team	Myanmar; Aung Ngeain; Yaw Sein Yah; Hla Hla San	Malaysia; Fatin Nurfatehah Mat Salleh; Norhayati Al-Madihah Hashim; Nor Rizah Ishak	Thailand; Yonlanda Rombaung; Nareumon Junsook; Sunee Detchokul
Mixed team	Myanmar; Aung Ngeain; Ye Min Swe; Aung Chaint Baw	Malaysia; Fatin Nurfatehah Mat Salleh; Muhammad Zaki Mahazan; Cheng Chu Sian	Indonesia; Dellie Threesyadinda; I Gusti Nyoman Puruhito; Alek Edwar

Preceded by 2009	Archery at the SEA Games; 2011 SEA Games	Succeeded by 2013
