= Laos at the 2011 SEA Games =

Laos at the 2011 Southeast Asian Games
- IOC code: LAO
- NOC: National Olympic Committee of Lao

in Jakarta and Palembang
- Competitors: 223 in 25 sports
- Flag bearer: Saysamone Sengdao (petanque)
- Officials: 134
- Medals Ranked 8th: Gold 9 Silver 7 Bronze 35 Total 51

Southeast Asian Games appearances
- 1959; 1961; 1965; 1967; 1969; 1971; 1973; 1975–1987; 1989; 1991; 1993; 1995; 1997; 1999; 2001; 2003; 2005; 2007; 2009; 2011; 2013; 2015; 2017; 2019; 2021; 2023; 2025; 2027; 2029

Laos is participating at the 2011 Southeast Asian Games which are being held in the cities of Palembang and Jakarta, Indonesia from 11 November 2011 to 22 November 2011.

== Medals ==
=== Medal table ===
Sport	Gold	Silver	Bronze	Total
Shorinji Kempo	2	2	7	11
Vovinam	2	0	5	7
Pentanque	2	0	2	4
Taekwondo	1	3	5	9
Judo	1	2	1	4
Shooting	1	0	0	1
Wushu	0	4	1	5
Sepak-Takraw	0	1	3	4
Karate-Do	0	0	4	4
Boxing	0	0	3	3
Wrestling	0	0	2	2
Soft Tennis	0	0	2	2
Pencak Silat	0	0	1	1
Total	9	12	31	57

== Medalist ==
Medal	Name	Sport	Event	Date
Gold	Mr.Ok Botsavang	petanque	55kg	
Gold	Mss.Yumyim Bounpasong, Mss.Mimi Yoysaikham	petanque	ຟ້ອນຄູ່ປະສົມ	
Gold	Mr.Phailat Thammavongsa	Vovinam	ຟ້ອນດ່ຽວ	
Gold	Mr.Vongduean Chantanyvong	Vovinam	55kg	
Gold	Mss.Souksakhone Muendouangpanya	Petanque	Women's Single	
Gold	Mss.Maneevanh souliya	Petanque	Women's shooting	
Gold	Mr.Sonexay Mangkuea	Taekwondo	63kg	
Gold	Mss.Phonenaly Xayyalath	Judo	52kg	
Gold	Mss.Khamla Xayyavong	Shooting	ເປົ້າເລື່ອນ	

=== Medals by date ===
Daily: Overall Medals
Day	Date	Gold medal	Silver medal	Bronze medal	Total
Day 1	11th	0	0	0	0
Day 2	12th	0	0	5	5
Day 3	13th	1	3	3	7
Day 4	14th	1	0	5	6
Day 5	15th	2	0	6	8
Day 6	16th	1	0	2	3
Day 7	17th	1	2	1	4
Day 8	18th	2	1	5	8
Day 9	19th	0	0	6	6
Day 10	20th	1	1	2	4
Day 11	21st	0	5	1	6
Day 12	22nd	0	0	0	0
