= Weightlifting at the 2011 SEA Games =

== Medal table ==
* Host nation (Indonesia)

Rank	Nation	Gold	Silver	Bronze	Total
1	Thailand	9	2	1	12
2	Indonesia*	4	8	2	14
3	Vietnam	1	2	6	9
4	Malaysia	0	1	2	3
4	Philippines	0	1	2	3
6	Myanmar	0	0	1	1
Totals (6 entries)		14	14	14	42

== Medal summary ==
=== Men ===
Event	Gold	Silver	Bronze
56 kg	Trần Lê Quốc Toàn; Vietnam	Jadi Setiadi; Indonesia	Thạch Kim Tuấn; Vietnam
62 kg	Eko Yuli Irawan; Indonesia	Muhammad Hasbi; Indonesia	Nguyễn Ngọc Trung; Vietnam
69 kg	Triyatno; Indonesia	Deni; Indonesia	Kyaw Moe Win; Myanmar
77 kg	Sandow Waldemar Nasution; Indonesia	Somphon Kaeokoet; Thailand	Ekkachai Yeeram; Thailand
85 kg	Pitaya Tibnoke; Thailand	Samuel Shendy Latupeirissa; Indonesia	Hoàng Tấn Tài; Vietnam
94 kg	Suthiphon Watthanakasiram; Thailand	Trần Văn Hóa; Vietnam	Christopher A. Bureros; Philippines
105 kg	Khunchai Nuchpum; Thailand	Bayu Saputra; Indonesia	Elisha Louis Tan Kim Ho; Malaysia
Over 105 kg	Surapong Watthanakasikam; Thailand	Abdul Azim Najimi; Malaysia	Richard Pep Agosto; Philippines

=== Women ===
Event	Gold	Silver	Bronze
48 kg	Panida Khamsri; Thailand	Phạm Thùy Dung; Vietnam	Masitoh; Indonesia
53 kg	Prapawadee Jaroenrattanatarakoon; Thailand	Citra Febrianti; Indonesia	Nguyễn Thị Thúy; Vietnam
58 kg	Rattikan Gulnoi; Thailand	Hidilyn Diaz; Philippines	Okta Dwi Paramita; Indonesia
63 kg	Pimsiri Sirikaew; Thailand	Darat Srisuwan; Thailand	Nguyễn Thị Phương Loan; Vietnam
69 kg	Wiriya Suwannarata; Thailand	Ni Luh Sinta Darmariani; Indonesia	Ngô Thị Xuyến; Vietnam
Over 69 kg	Novita Sherly Kurniati; Indonesia	Riska Anjani Yasin; Indonesia	Nur Jannah Batrisyah; Malaysia
