= Fencing at the 2011 SEA Games =

Fencing at the 26th SEA Games was held in University of Indonesia, Jakarta, Indonesia.

== Medalists ==
=== Men ===
| Event | Gold | Silver | Bronze |
|---|---|---|---|
| Individual sabre | Walbert Mendoza; Philippines | Vũ Thành An; Vietnam | Wiradech Kothny; Thailand |
| Individual sabre | Walbert Mendoza; Philippines | Vũ Thành An; Vietnam | Yu Peng Kean; Malaysia |
| Team sabre | Malaysia; Radhi Hasim; Yu Peng Kean; Ming Chang | Vietnam; Vũ Thành An; Nguyễn Văn Quỳnh; Tô Văn Hợp | Thailand; Phattana Thepmalaphansiri; Sansern Ngernrungruangroj; Wiradech Kothny |
| Team sabre | Malaysia; Radhi Hasim; Yu Peng Kean; Ming Chang | Vietnam; Vũ Thành An; Nguyễn Văn Quỳnh; Tô Văn Hợp | Philippines; Gian Carlo Nocom; Edmon Velez; Eric Brando II |
| Individual foil | Nontapat Panchan; Thailand | Suppakorn Sritang-orn; Thailand | Noor Iskandar Tauran; Malaysia |
| Individual foil | Nontapat Panchan; Thailand | Suppakorn Sritang-orn; Thailand | Sinatrio Raharjo; Indonesia |
| Team foil | Thailand; Phatthanaphong Srisawat; Satabun Nootprapai; Nontapat Panchan | Indonesia; Aditya Baskara; Hafidz Ricky; Sinatrio Raharjo | Malaysia; Sabri Nullah; Junaidi Bardin; Noor Iskandar Tauran |
| Team foil | Thailand; Phatthanaphong Srisawat; Satabun Nootprapai; Nontapat Panchan | Indonesia; Aditya Baskara; Hafidz Ricky; Sinatrio Raharjo | Singapore; Wu Jie; Tan Yuanzi; Zhang Zhenggang |
| Individual épée | Joshua Koh; Malaysia | Muhammad Haerullah; Indonesia | Nguyễn Tiến Nhật; Vietnam |
| Individual épée | Joshua Koh; Malaysia | Muhammad Haerullah; Indonesia | Panthawit Chamcharern; Thailand |
| Team épée | Thailand; Songpraphai Wongshaton; Supoj Chavalanarumit; Witsarach Kongsuwankeeree | Indonesia; Cucu Sundara; Indra Jaya Kusuma; Budi Darmanto | Malaysia; Joshua Koh; Hasmie Sohaini; Noor Nashriq Adli Noor Jali |
| Team épée | Thailand; Songpraphai Wongshaton; Supoj Chavalanarumit; Witsarach Kongsuwankeeree | Indonesia; Cucu Sundara; Indra Jaya Kusuma; Budi Darmanto | Vietnam; Nguyễn Văn Thắng; Nguyễn Phước Đến; Nguyễn Tiến Nhật |

=== Women ===
| Event | Gold | Silver | Bronze |
|---|---|---|---|
| Individual sabre | Nguyễn Thị Lệ Dung; Vietnam | Diah Permatasari; Indonesia | Nguyễn Thị Thanh Loan; Vietnam |
| Individual sabre | Nguyễn Thị Lệ Dung; Vietnam | Diah Permatasari; Indonesia | Sirawalai Starrat; Thailand |
| Team sabre | Indonesia; Maria Wauran; Ameila Noerliyami; Diah Permatasari | Vietnam; Trinh Thi Ly; Nguyen Thi Hanh; Nguyễn Thị Thanh Loan | Thailand; Pramkamol Benjawan; Nanthip Pooriyapan; Sirawalai Starrat |
| Team sabre | Indonesia; Maria Wauran; Ameila Noerliyami; Diah Permatasari | Vietnam; Trinh Thi Ly; Nguyen Thi Hanh; Nguyễn Thị Thanh Loan | Philippines; Jylyn Nicanor; Lenny Otadoy; Michelle Brozula |
| Individual foil | Nguyễn Thị Tươi; Vietnam | Lê Thị Bích; Vietnam | Natasha Ezzra Abu Bakar; Malaysia |
| Individual foil | Nguyễn Thị Tươi; Vietnam | Lê Thị Bích; Vietnam | Nunta Chantasuvannasin; Thailand |
| Team foil | Vietnam; Nguyễn Thị Nguyệt; Lý Kiều Diễm; Nguyễn Thị Tươi | Singapore; Cheryl Wong Ye Han; Joan Ang Liting; Wang Wenying | Thailand; Nuanchan Phimkaeo; Chidchanok Limvattana; Nunta Chantasuvannasin |
| Team foil | Vietnam; Nguyễn Thị Nguyệt; Lý Kiều Diễm; Nguyễn Thị Tươi | Singapore; Cheryl Wong Ye Han; Joan Ang Liting; Wang Wenying | Indonesia; Inca Maya Sari; Chintya Anreiny Pua; Verdiana Rihandini |
| Individual épée | Trần Thị Len; Vietnam | Isnawaty Sir Idar; Indonesia | Wijitta Takhamwong; Thailand |
| Individual épée | Trần Thị Len; Vietnam | Isnawaty Sir Idar; Indonesia | Ann Karin Melbye; Singapore |
| Team épée | Vietnam; Nguyễn Thanh Vân; Nguyễn Thu Hiền; Trần Thị Len | Indonesia; Dian Eka Pertiwi; Dian Rahmayati; Ikah Sarikah | Thailand; Wanwipa Thongphueak; Daret Maksin; Wijitta Takhamwong |
| Team épée | Vietnam; Nguyễn Thanh Vân; Nguyễn Thu Hiền; Trần Thị Len | Indonesia; Dian Eka Pertiwi; Dian Rahmayati; Ikah Sarikah | Philippines; Madel Galvez; Harlene Orendain; Michelle Brozula |

== Medal table ==
* Host nation (Indonesia)

| Rank | Nation | Gold | Silver | Bronze | Total |
|---|---|---|---|---|---|
| 1 | Vietnam | 5 | 4 | 3 | 12 |
| 2 | Thailand | 3 | 1 | 9 | 13 |
| 3 | Malaysia | 2 | 0 | 5 | 7 |
| 4 | Indonesia* | 1 | 6 | 2 | 9 |
| 5 | Philippines | 1 | 0 | 3 | 4 |
| 6 | Singapore | 0 | 1 | 2 | 3 |
| Totals (6 entries) | | 12 | 12 | 24 | 48 |
