= Bowling at the 2011 SEA Games =

Bowling at the 26th SEA Games will be held at Ancol Bowling, Jakarta, Indonesia.

== Medal summary ==
=== Men ===
Event	Gold	Silver	Bronze
Singles	Frederick Ong; Philippines	Jeremy Posadas; Philippines	Adrian Ang; Malaysia
Doubles	Malaysia; Adrian Ang; Liew Kien Liang	Philippines; Engelberto Rivera; Frederick Ong	Malaysia; Syafiq Ridhwan; Zulmazran Zulkifli
Trios	Malaysia; Adrian Ang; Liew Kien Liang; Zulmazran Zulkifli	Malaysia; Aaron Kong; Syafiq Ridhwan; Muhammad Nur Aiman	Philippines; Engelberto Rivera; Frederick Ong; Raoul Miranda
Team of five	Malaysia; Adrian Ang; Liew Kien Liang; Zulmazran Zulkifli; Aaron Kong; Syafiq Ridhwan; Muhammad Nur Aiman	Philippines; Engelberto Rivera; Frederick Ong; Raoul Miranda; Jeremy Posadas; Giancarlo Mansilungan; Rogelio Enriquez Jr.	Indonesia; Ryan Leonard Lalisang; Oscar; Billy Muhammad Islam; Hardy Rachmadian; Yeri Ramadona
Masters	Adrian Ang; Malaysia	Frederick Ong; Philippines	Syafiq Ridhwan; Malaysia

=== Women ===
Event	Gold	Silver	Bronze
Singles	Cherie Tan; Singapore	Sin Li Jane; Malaysia	Jazreel Tan; Singapore
Doubles	Malaysia; Jacqueline Jenelee Sijore; Zandra Aziela	Singapore; Cherie Tan; Daphne Tan	Malaysia; Dayang Khairuniza Dhiyana; Sharon Koh Suet Len
Trios	Thailand; Angkana Netrviseth; Tanaprang Sathean; Yanee Saebe	Singapore; Cherie Tan; Jazreel Tan; Daphne Tan	Singapore; Jasmine Yeong-Nathan; New Hui Fen; Shayna Ng
Team of five	Singapore; Jasmine Yeong-Nathan; New Hui Fen; Shayna Ng; Cherie Tan; Jazreel Tan; Daphne Tan	Indonesia; Putty Insavilla Armein; Sharon Limansantoso; Tannya Roumimper; Ivana Hie; Novie Phang; Puteri Astari Suni Saputro	Malaysia; Jacqueline Jenelee Sijore; Zandra Aziela; Sharon Koh; Zatil Iman Abdul Ghani; Sin Li Jane
Masters	Cherie Tan; Singapore	Sharon Koh; Malaysia	Zandra Aziela; Malaysia

== Medal table ==
* Host nation (Indonesia)

Rank	Nation	Gold	Silver	Bronze	Total
1	Malaysia (MAS)	5	3	6	14
2	Singapore (SIN)	3	2	2	7
3	Philippines (PHI)	1	4	1	6
4	Thailand (THA)	1	0	0	1
5	Indonesia (INA)*	0	1	1	2
Totals (5 entries)		10	10	10	30
