= Canoeing at the 2011 SEA Games =

2011 SEA games in Karawang

Canoe and Kayak at the 2011 SEA Games
- Venue: Cipule Regatta Course
- Location: West Java, Indonesia

Canoeing at the 2011 SEA Games took place at Cipule Regatta Course, Karawang, Karawang Regency of West Java. It was the second sport to be played at the 26th SEA Games after football; however, it was the first sport in which gold medal was awarded in that edition of SEA Games. The first gold medal of this SEAG edition was awarded to Wichan Jaitieng of Thailand.

== Medal table ==
* Host nation (Indonesia)

Rank	Nation	Gold	Silver	Bronze	Total
1	Indonesia*	6	5	2	13
2	Thailand	5	2	3	10
3	Singapore	2	5	3	10
4	Vietnam	2	0	5	7
5	Myanmar	0	3	2	5
6	Malaysia	0	0	1	1
Totals (6 entries)		15	15	16	46

== Medal summary ==
=== Men ===
Event	Gold	Silver	Bronze
C1 200 m	Anwar Tarra; Indonesia	Win Htike; Myanmar	Trần Văn Long; Vietnam
C1 1000 m	Eka Octarorianus; Indonesia	Win Htike; Myanmar	Trần Văn Long; Vietnam
C2 200 m	Indonesia; Anwar Tarra; Eka Octarorianus	Thailand; Phanudet Phetmikha; Thammarat Phaophan	Myanmar; Ye Aung Soe; Win Htike
C2 1000 m	Indonesia; Eka Octarorianus; Anwar Tarra	Myanmar; Ye Aung Soe; Win Htike	Thailand; Thammarat Phaophan; Phanudet Phetmika
K1 200 m	Nguyễn Thành Quang; Vietnam	Kasemsit Borriboonwasin; Thailand	Gandie; Indonesia
K1 1000 m	Wichan Jaitieng; Thailand	Lucas Teo Guang Yi; Singapore	Muchlis; Indonesia
K2 200 m	Thailand; Nathaworn Waenphrom; Anusorn Sommit	Indonesia; Andri Sugiarto; Silo	Malaysia; Hamdan bin Muhammad; Mohd bin Parmi
K2 200 m	Thailand; Nathaworn Waenphrom; Anusorn Sommit	Indonesia; Andri Sugiarto; Silo	Singapore; Clarence Chua; Brandon Ooi Wei Cheng
K2 1000 m	Thailand; Piyaphan Phaophat; Nathaworn Waenphrom	Indonesia; Ajurahman; Jaslin	Singapore; Brandon Ooi Wei Cheng; Daniel Ang Jia Ming
K4 1000 m	Thailand; Piyaphan Phaophat; Nathaworn Waenphrom; Nattahawat Yatra; Chatcharit Bunmuen	Indonesia; Dedy Kurniawan; Sutrisno; Asep Hidayat; Jaferry Siregar	Singapore; Tay Zi Qiang; Daniel Ang Jia Ming; Lucas Teo Guang Yi; Muhd Syaheenul Aim

=== Women ===
Event	Gold	Silver	Bronze
K1 200 m	Kanokpan Suansan; Thailand	Geraldine Lee; Singapore	Nguyễn Thị Duyên; Vietnam
K1 500 m	Geraldine Lee; Singapore	Masripah; Indonesia	Nguyễn Thị Duyên; Vietnam
K2 200 m	Singapore; Suzanne Seah; Steph Chen	Indonesia; Kanti Santyawati; Masripah	Vietnam; Kieu Thi Hao; Nguyen Thi Mai
K2 500 m	Vietnam; Kieu Thi Hao; Nguyen Thi Mai	Singapore; Suzanne Seah; Steph Chen	Myanmar; Myint Myint Than; Hnin Wai Lwin
K4 200 m	Indonesia; Kanti Santyawati; Sarce Aronggear; Masripah; Rasima	Singapore; Lee Wilo; Annabelle Ng; Andrea Chen; Geraldine Lee	Thailand; Waratchaya Kheha; Kanokpan Suansan; Pattraluck Phumsatan; Woraporn Boonyuhong
K4 500 m	Indonesia; Kanti Santyawati; Masripah; Rasima; Sarce Aronggear	Singapore; Geraldine Lee; Annabelle Ng; Andrea Chen; Lee Wilo	Thailand; Sakunrat Huansat; Waratchaya Kheha; Woraporn Boonyuhong; Kanokpan Suansan
