= James De Los Santos =

Filipino karateka (born 1990)

Personal information
- Full name: Orencio James Virgil De Los Santos
- Citizenship: Filipino
- Born: February 7, 1990 (age 36)
- Home town: Cebu City
- Height: 1.65
- Weight: 65 kg (143 lb)

Sport
- Country: Philippines
- Sport: Karate
- Event: Kata
- Coached by: Benjamin Balmori
Medal record
Men's karate
Representing Philippines
SEA Games
| Bronze medal – third place | 2011 Jakarta | Individual kata |
| Bronze medal – third place | 2017 Kuala Lumpur | Individual kata |
ISKF World Shoto Cup
| Gold medal – first place | 2012 Cebu | Adult individual kata |
| Gold medal – first place | 2016 Cape Town | Adult individual kata |

Orencio James Virgil De Los Santos (born February 7, 1990) is a Filipino karate practitioner who competes in kata events. He has competed in the Asian Games and the Southeast Asian Games.

He follows the shotokan style of karate and also participated in e-kata tournaments, or kata competitions held online since the beginning of the COVID-19 pandemic. As of October 2020, he was the top-ranked competitor under the e-kata individual male seniors category in the e-kata world rankings.

== Career ==
=== Early years ===
Karate was not De los Santos' first sport. He played football for Cebu International School's team in his elementary years, and for Paref Springdale's team from Grade 7 until his first year in high school. He reluctantly took up karate, after he was convinced by his parents due to him being bullied at school.

He participated in tournaments, although he lost in his first three tournaments when he was 14 years old. Benjamin Balmori was his first instructor. He was about to quit karate until he was inspired by the Philippine national team competing at the 2005 Southeast Asian Games which was hosted in the country. He also won his first match prior to the regional games.

=== 2005–2018 ===
After taking part in the 2005 Southeast Asian Games as a spectator, De los Santos decided to continue his karate career. In the domestic level, he competed for his hometown Cebu City at the Philippine National Games for at least six times and won six gold medals.

De los Santos was drafted into the Philippine national team sanctioned by the Philippine Karate Federation in 2008 and went on to compete in the Southeast Asian Games and in the Asian Games.

De los Santos made his SEA appearance at the 2011 Southeast Asian Games which was hosted in Indonesia. He won a bronze medal at the men's kata event. At the 2013 Southeast Asian Games which was hosted in Myanmar, delos Santos didn't medal. He was not able to contest at the 2015 games in Singapore due to karate not being included in calendar. He won a bronze medal in the men's kata event at the 2017 edition hosted in Kuala Lumpur.

He has represented the Philippines in men's kata at the Asian Games in two occasions; in 2014 and 2018.

Delos Santos has also competed in the International Shotokan Karate Federation World Shoto Cup where he won in 2012 and 2016.

=== Dispute with Karate NSAs (2018–2019) ===
De los Santos was among those who testified in the corruption case of the Philippine Karatedo Federation, which was later replaced by the Karate Pilipinas Inc (KPI) as the Philippines' national sports association. However he became involved in a controversy with KPI which led to his exclusion from the Philippine national team for the 2019 Southeast Asian Games after he alleged irregularities within the KPI. De los Santos underwent training in Japan where he learned shotokan kata, but when he returned to training in Manila with KPI and he had a disagreement with the local coaches. He felt that the coaches were not receptive to what he learned in his training in Japan. KPI President Richard Lim said that delos Santos did not pass the national team standards of KPI's local coaches and its foreign head coach for "many reasons".

=== E-kata career (2020–2021) ===
After his fallout with KPI, De los Santos transitioned to online kata or e-kata and competed in various international tournaments without KPI's endorsement, which meant that the government body Philippine Sports Commission could not give assistance to De los Santos in response to his e-kata feats. He formerly competed under the International Shotokan Karate Federation. He started competing in e-kata tournaments in March 2020, and due to the COVID-19 pandemic, karate tournaments could only be held virtually. He went on to win tournaments which resulted in him becoming the top-ranked karateka in the e-kata world rankings under the e-kata individual male seniors category by October 2020. In 2020, he won a total of 36 gold medals in e-kata tournaments. The following year, he surpassed this feat winning his 37th gold medal by November 2021.

== Coaching career ==
As of 2020, Delos Santos serves as a mentor to karateka from the Maharlika Karatedo Kai of the Philippines International (MKKPI).
