= Paragliding at the 2011 SEA Games =

Paragliding at the 2011 SEA Games were held at Gunung Mas, Bogor Regency.

== Medal table ==
* Host nation (Indonesia)

Rank	Nation	Gold	Silver	Bronze	Total
1	Indonesia*	11	4	6	21
2	Thailand	2	5	2	9
3	Malaysia	0	2	4	6
Totals (3 entries)		13	11	12	36

== Medal summary ==
=== Men ===
Event	Gold	Silver	Bronze
Accuracy	Thomas Widyananto; Indonesia	Dede Misbah; Indonesia	Lilik Darmono; Indonesia
Accuracy team	Indonesia; Dede Misbah; Hening Paradigma; Lilik Darmono; Nanang Sunarya; Thomas Widyananto	Thailand; Chakrit Baepphaen; Kampol Samngamnim; Phompiriya Tapeanthong; Sarayut Chinpongsatorn; Tanit Sriviset	Malaysia; Abdul Rahman; Mohd Khairul bin Kamaruddin; M. Faridil Fadzreen; Maramizal bin Omar; Nasaruddin A. Bakar
Open distance	Thomas Widyananto; Indonesia	Hening Paradigma; Indonesia	Nanang Sunarya; Indonesia
Open distance team	Indonesia; Dede Misbah; Hening Paradigma; Lilik Darmono; Nanang Sunarya; Thomas Widyananto	Thailand; Chakrit Baepphaen; Kampol Samngamnim; Phompiriya Tapeanthong; Sarayut Chinpongsatorn; Tanit Sriviset	Malaysia; Abdul Rahman; Mohd Khairul Kamaruddin; M. Faridil Fadzreen; Maramizal bin Omar; Nasaruddin A. Bakar
Race to goal	Sarayut Chinpongsatorn; Thailand	Chakrit Baepphaen; Thailand	Thomas Widyananto; Indonesia
Race to goal team	Thailand; Chakrit Baepphaen; Kampol Samngamnim; Phompiriya Tapeanthong; Sarayut Chinpongsatorn; Tanit Sriviset	Malaysia; Abdul Rahman; Mohd Khairul Kamaruddin; M. Faridil Fadzreen; Maramizal bin Omar; Nasaruddin A. Bakar	Indonesia; Dede Misbah; Hening Paradigma; Lilik Darmono; Nanang Sunarya; Thomas Widyananto

=== Women ===
Event	Gold	Silver	Bronze
Accuracy	Cherry Bonaria; Indonesia	Lis Andriana; Indonesia	Ifa Kurniawati; Indonesia
Accuracy team	Indonesia; Cherry Bonaria; Dian Rosnalia; Ifa Kurniawati; Lis Andriana; Milawati D. Sirin	Thailand; Gorbua Yenvaree; Netikan Paosopa; Nunnapat Phuchong; Pattarin Insornsart; Plaifha Thongdonpum	Malaysia; Asjanita Aini; Asmawati Ahmad; Nur Shaziylia Sahar; Tan Seng Jiu; Nur Shazlisha Sahar
Open distance	Ifa Kurniawati; Indonesia	shared gold	Dian Rosnalia; Indonesia
Open distance	Lis Andriana; Indonesia	shared gold	Dian Rosnalia; Indonesia
Open distance team	Indonesia; Cherry Bonaria; Dian Rosnalia; Ifa Kurniawati; Lis Andriana; Milawati D. Sirin	Malaysia; Asjanita Aini; Asmawati Ahmad; Nur Shaziylia Sahar; Tan Seng Jiu; Nur Shazlisha Sahar	Thailand; Gorbua Yenvaree; Chayaporn Boonna; Nunnapat Phuchong; Pattarin Insornsart; Plaifha Thongdonpum
Race to goal	Milawati D. Sirin; Indonesia	Lis Andriana; Indonesia	Plaifha Thongdonpum; Thailand
Race to goal team	Indonesia; Cherry Bonaria; Dian Rosnalia; Ifa Kurniawati; Lis Andriana; Milawati D. Sirin	Thailand; Gorbua Yenvaree; Netikan Paosopa; Nunnapat Phuchong; Pattarin Insornsart; Plaifha Thongdonpum	Malaysia; Asjanita Aini; Asmawati Ahmad; Nur Shaziylia Sahar; Tan Seng Jiu; Nur Shazlisha Sahar
