= Karate at the 2011 SEA Games =

Karate competition

Karate at the 2011 SEA Games was held in Jakarta, Indonesia.

== Medal table ==
* Host nation (Indonesia)

Rank	Nation	Gold	Silver	Bronze	Total
1	Indonesia (INA)*	10	2	4	16
2	Malaysia (MAS)	4	2	7	13
3	Vietnam (VIE)	3	8	3	14
4	Thailand (THA)	0	2	3	5
5	Philippines (PHI)	0	1	6	7
6	Brunei (BRU)	0	1	1	2
6	Myanmar (MYA)	0	1	1	2
8	Laos (LAO)	0	0	3	3
9	Singapore (SIN)	0	0	1	1
Totals (9 entries)		17	17	29	63

== Medal summary ==
=== Men ===
Event	Gold	Silver	Bronze
Individual Kata	Faisal Zainuddin; Indonesia	Pham Thay Huy; Vietnam	James delos Santos; Philippines Leong Tze Wai; Malaysia
Team Kata	Indonesia (INA); Fidelys Lolobua; Faizal Zainuddin; Aswar	Myanmar (MYA); Aung Khant; Min Hein Khant; Tun Kyaw Kyaw	Malaysia (MAS); Kam Kah Sam; Leong Tze Wai; Lim Chee Wei Laos (LAO); Inthanousone Vilaysouk; Kavine Saythansavanh; Souphanith Vongsengthong
Kumite 55 kg and below	Loganesha Rao; Malaysia	Nguyen Quang Phuc; Vietnam	Imam Tauhid; Indonesia Tay Qinyuan; Singapore
Kumite 60 kg and below	Donny Dharmawan; Indonesia	Nguyen Hoang Hiep; Vietnam	Jayson Ramil Macaalay; Philippines San Toe; Myanmar
Kumite 67 kg and below	Jintar Simanjuntak; Indonesia	Mohamad Fadilah; Brunei	Chantabole Ath; Laos Kunasilan Lakanathan; Malaysia
Kumite 75 kg and below	Shaharudin Jamaludin; Malaysia	Nguyen Minh Phung; Vietnam	Christo Mondolu; Indonesia Songwut Muntaen; Thailand
Kumite 84 kg and below	Teagajaran Kunasarakan; Malaysia	Bui Nhu My; Vietnam	Ronnel Garcia Balingit; Philippines Hendro Salim; Indonesia
Kumite 84 kg and above	Umar Syarief; Indonesia	Sanphasit Chonlaphan; Thailand	Pham Quang Duy; Vietnam
Team Kumite	Indonesia (INA); Umar Syarief; Christo Mondolu; Hendro Salim; Jintar Simanjuntak; Donny Dharmawan; Yulizar Usia Motuty	Philippines (PHI)	Brunei (BRU) Malaysia (MAS)

=== Women ===
Event	Gold	Silver	Bronze
Individual Kata	Flenty Enoch; Indonesia	Do Thi Thu Ha; Vietnam	Thor Chee Yee; Malaysia
Team Kata	Indonesia (INA); Dewi Prasetya Kurniawan; Yulianti Syafrudin; Sisilia Agustiani	Malaysia (MAS); Khaw Yee Voon; Thor Chee Yee; Celine Lee Xin Yi	Vietnam (VIE); Nguyen Thi Hang; Do Thi Thu Ha; Nguyen Thanh Hang Myanmar (MYA); Poe Myar; Swe Swe Aung; Thazin Aye
Kumite 50 kg and below	Vu Thi Nguyet Anh; Vietnam	Paweena Laksachat; Thailand	Telly Melinda; Indonesia Erica Celin Samonte; Philippines
Kumite 55 kg and below	Le Bich Phuong; Vietnam	Dyah Puspitasari; Indonesia	Mae Soriano; Philippines Alagashan Nisha; Malaysia
Kumite 61 kg and below	Yamini Gopalasamy; Malaysia	Tran Hoang Yen Phuong; Vietnam	Arm Sukkiaw; Thailand Lokhamphanh Phouvy; Laos
Kumite 68 kg and below	Yulanda Asmuruf; Indonesia	Bui Thi Trieu; Vietnam	Shakkila Sani Jefry; Malaysia Kanokporn Tipnawa; Thailand
Kumite 68 kg and above	Thach Thi Trang; Vietnam	Mardiah Nasution; Indonesia	Phommachan Phimpha; Laos
Team Kumite	Indonesia (INA); Nur Hadiyanti Fitrianingsih; Yulanda Asmuruf; Martinel Prihastuti	Malaysia (MAS); Jamalliah; Yamini Gopalasamy; Shakkila Sani Jefry	Philippines (PHI) Vietnam (VIE)
