= Shooting at the 2011 SEA Games =

Shooting at the 2011 SEA Games was held at Jakabaring Shooting Range, Palembang, Indonesia.

== Medal summary ==
=== Men ===
Event	Gold	Silver	Bronze
10 m air pistol	Hoàng Xuân Vinh; Vietnam	Noppadon Sutiviruch; Thailand	Trần Quốc Cường; Vietnam
25 m standard pistol	Anang Yulianto; Indonesia	Khalel Abdullah; Malaysia	Bùi Quang Nam; Vietnam
25 m center fire pistol	Hoàng Xuân Vinh; Vietnam	Jakkrit Panichpatikum; Thailand	Hà Minh Thành; Vietnam
25 m rapid fire pistol	Hà Minh Thành; Vietnam	Hasli Izwan; Malaysia	Vorapol Kulchairattana; Thailand
50 m free pistol	Trần Quốc Cường; Vietnam	Hoàng Xuân Vinh; Vietnam	Maung Kyu; Myanmar
10 m air rifle	Zhang Jin; Singapore	Mohd Hadafi Jaafar; Malaysia	Weerawat Chaisawat; Thailand
50 m rifle 3 positions	Nguyễn Duy Hoàng; Vietnam	Napis Tortungpanich; Thailand	Mohd Hadafi Jaafar; Malaysia
50 m rifle prone	Vũ Thành Hưng; Vietnam	Shahril Sahak; Malaysia	Attapon Uea-aree; Thailand
10 m running target	Ngô Hữu Vượng; Vietnam	Đỗ Đức Hùng; Vietnam	Masruri; Indonesia

=== Women ===
Event	Gold	Silver	Bronze
10 m air pistol	Kanokan Chaimongkol; Thailand	Lê Thị Hoàng Ngọc; Vietnam	Tanyaporn Prucksakorn; Thailand
10 m air rifle	Nur Suryani Taibi; Malaysia	Jasmine Ser; Singapore	Patsornnut Hongprasert; Thailand
50 m rifle 3 positions	Nur Suryani Taibi; Malaysia	Sununta Majchacheep; Thailand	Nur Ayuni Farhana Abdul Halim; Malaysia
50 m rifle prone	Maharani Ardy; Indonesia	Vitchuda Pichitkanjanakul; Thailand	Muslifah Zulkifli; Malaysia
10 m running target	Xayyavong Khamla; Laos	Thidarat Attakit; Thailand	Nourma Try Indriani; Indonesia

== Medal table ==
* Host nation (Indonesia)

Rank	Nation	Gold	Silver	Bronze	Total
1	Vietnam	7	3	3	13
2	Malaysia	2	4	3	9
3	Indonesia*	2	0	2	4
4	Thailand	1	6	5	12
5	Singapore	1	1	0	2
6	Laos	1	0	0	1
7	Myanmar	0	0	1	1
Totals (7 entries)		14	14	14	42
