= Diah Permatasari (fencer) =

Indonesian fencer (born 1990)

Personal information
- Born: 5 May 1990 (age 36) Probolinggo, East Java, Indonesia

Fencing career
- Sport: Fencing
- Country: Indonesia
Medal record
Women's fencing
Representing Indonesia
Southeast Asian Games
Gold medal – first place	2011 Jakarta–Palembang	Team sabre
Silver medal – second place	2011 Jakarta–Palembang	Individual sabre
Silver medal – second place	2019 Philippines	Individual sabre
Bronze medal – third place	2015 Singapore	Team sabre

Diah Permatasari (born 5 May 1990 in Probolinggo) is an Indonesian fencer. She competed in the individual sabre event at the 2012 Summer Olympics and was eliminated in the round of 32 by American Mariel Zagunis.
