= Lee Ying Shi =

Bruneian Wuwshu athlete (born 1994)

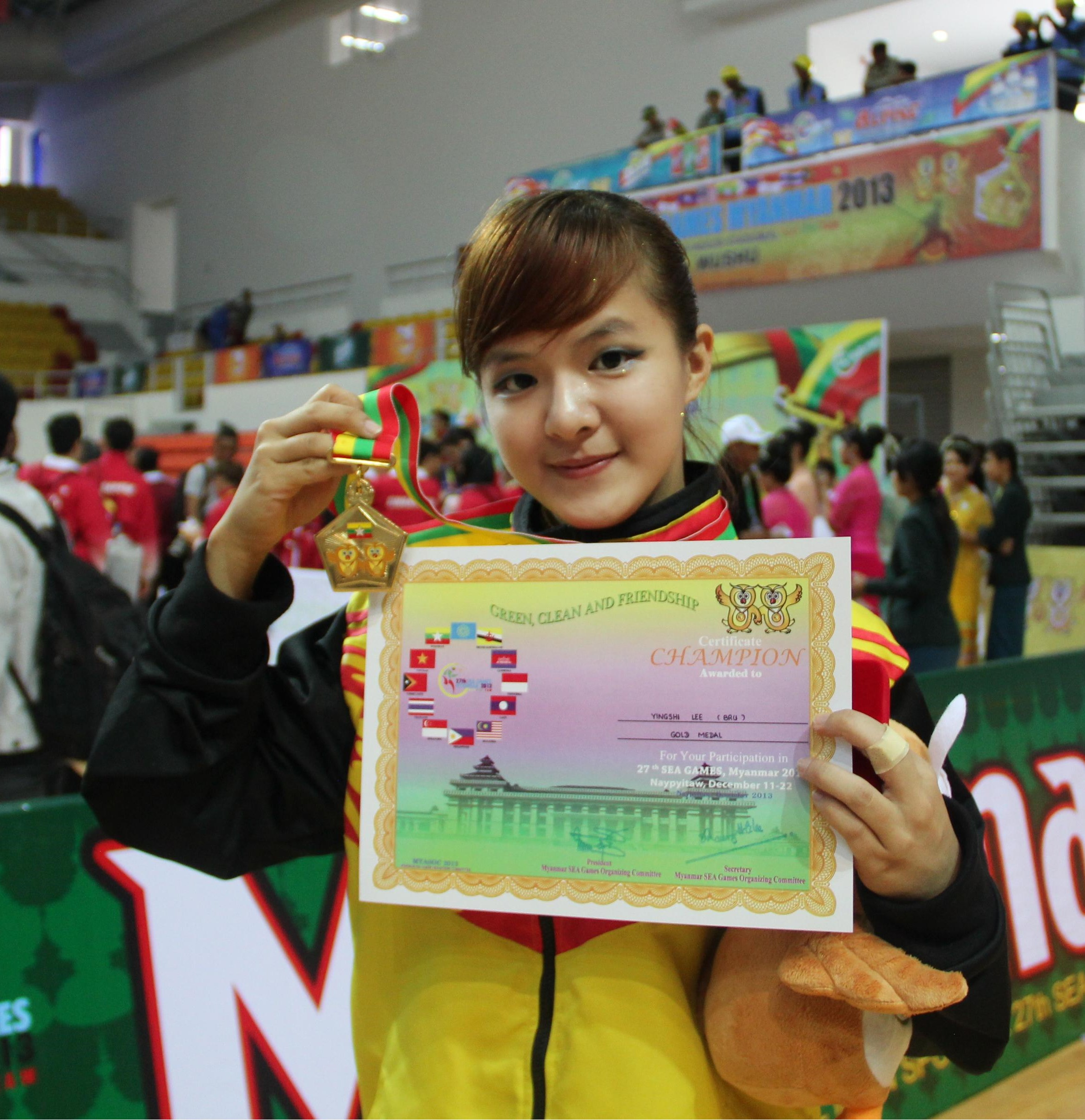
- Lee holding her 27th SEA Games gold medal in 2013

Personal information
- Born: Lee Yingshi; 23 June 1994 (age 32) Brunei
- Education: Chung Hwa Middle School; Meragang Sixth Form Centre; Universiti Brunei Darussalam
- Occupations: Martial Artist, Athlete
- Height: 155 cm (5 ft 1 in)
- Weight: 43 kg (95 lb; 6 st 11 lb)

Sport
- Sport: Wushu
- Events: Duilian, Changquan and Daoshu
- Team: Brunei Wushu Team
- Coached by: Li Hui
Medal record
Women's Wushu Taolu
Representing Brunei
Asian Indoor Games
| Bronze medal – third place | 2009 Hanoi | Duilian |
SEA Games
| Silver medal – second place | 2009 Vientiane | Duilian |
| Silver medal – second place | 2011 Jakarta | Duilian |
| Gold medal – first place | 2013 Naypyidaw | Duilian |
| Bronze medal – third place | 2015 Singapore | Duilian |
World Junior Wushu Championships
| Silver medal – second place | 2010 Singapore | Duilian |
Asian Wushu Championships
| Gold medal – first place | 2012 Ho Chi Minh City | Duilian |
Asian Junior Wushu Championships
| Bronze medal – third place | 2009 Macau | Daoshu |
| Gold medal – first place | 2011 Shanghai | Duilian |

Lee Ying Shi
- Simplified Chinese: 李莹诗
- Traditional Chinese: 李瑩詩
Transcriptions
Standard Mandarin
- Hanyu Pinyin: Lǐ Yíngshī

Lee Yingshi (Chinese: 李莹诗; pinyin: Lǐ Yíngshī; born 23 June 1994), commonly spelled Lee Ying Shi, is a retired Bruneian Wushu athlete of Chinese descent specialising in Duilian event.

== Early life and education ==
Lee started practicing Wushu as a co-curricular activity at Chung Hwa Middle School, Bandar Seri Begawan, together with her sister and brother. She completed her sixth form at Meragang Sixth Form Centre from 2013 to 2014.

== Career ==
Lee and Faustina Woo Wai Sii won the bronze medal in Daoshu and Nandao respectively in the 5th Asian Junior Wushu Championships in Macau, China, in June 2009, marking the first time the sultanate has won a medal in an international Wushu competition.

Lee and Woo won bronze medal in Duilian event in the 3rd Asian Indoor Games in Vietnam. At the Trinh Hoai Duc Gymnasium on 7 November 2009, Lee and Woo shared for the bronze medal with Indonesia team in the women's single weapon vs. weapon competition with a score of 9.40.

Brunei's sole silver medal came from Lee and Woo in the 25th SEA Games in Vientiane. The two took home Brunei's first-ever silver medal at the Lao International Trade Exhibition and Convention Centre on 13 December 2009. They shared the silver medal in the women's duilian event with Vietnam, who also achieved a score of 9.45 from the judges.

Brunei competed in the four-day 4th World Traditional Wushu Championships (WTWC) for the second time, starting on 16 October 2010, in Shiyan, China. Lee and Woo, two of the six medallists, led the country's effort. At the event, the duo took home the gold medal.

She was a part of the Bruneian delegation at the 16th Asian Games in Guangzhou, China. She participated in the Changquan event, but she came up in 11th received 7.72 points for her performance in her category. Lee believed she might have improved on her degree of difficulty (C) score of 1.05, her overall performance (B) score of 2.47, and her quality of movement (A) score of 4.2 out of a possible five points were given by the judges. Lee also has been selected to carry the nation's flag at the opening ceremony of the Guangzhou Asian Games.

After participating in the 3rd World Junior Wushu Championships held in Singapore, Lee and Woo proved Brunei's ability to compete internationally. On 8 December 2010, the pair placed second in the women's Group A (16–18 years old) duilian competition at the Jurong East Sports & Cultural Centre. With 9.45 points, the Bruneian duo almost missed out on gold, while Vietnam's 9.51 points secured them a silver medal.

In 2011, the 17-year-old Lee and Ho Chia Yin won the nation's lone gold medal in the Duilian event at the 6th Asian Junior Wushu Championships in Shanghai, China, on 19–21 August 2011.

In the women's duilian event, Lee and Woo took home silver at the 26th SEA Games on 18 November 2011, at the Tennis Indoor Senayan. Their score of 9.70 points was just 0.01 points less than Singapore's 9.71 points for gold. The two placed last among the 11 nations in the 12-day regional sports tournament, lacking a gold medal.

Lee and Woo's gold medal in women's duilian at the 8th Asian Wushu Championships in Vietnam on 25 August 2012, was the Brunei delegation's biggest achievement to date. The two tied for first place in the Phú Thọ Indoor Stadium in Ho Chi Minh City with 9.59 points, just ahead of Hong Kong, who scored 9.58 points.

Lee, who represented Brunei in wushu at the 3rd Islamic Solidarity Games in Palembang, Indonesia, finished at the bottom in the women's changquan event with a score of 9.47 on 29 September 2013.

Four years of hardship came to an end on 10 December 2013, as Brunei finally won gold medal in the women's duilian event at the 27th SEA Games. They lost against Singapore by a point in both the 2009 SEA Games in Laos and the 2011 SEA Games in Indonesia. Intriguingly, though, the roles are reversed at the 2013 tournament in Myanmar, when Lee and Woo score 9.67 to overcome Singapore by the identical 0.01 point margin. Both medalists received praise from Prince Sufri Bolkiah during his visit to Team Brunei at the Athletes Village.

During the 28th SEA Games held at the Singapore Expo Hall 2 in Tampines from 6 to 8 June 2015, Lee and Woo competed at the women's duilian event. The Bruneian duo scored 9.64 points, winning the bronze.

== Later life ==
As of 9 May 2016, Lee is a student at Universiti Brunei Darussalam (UBD). In the same year, she retired from being an athlete in order to have full concentration in her education. In 2020, she graduated in Bachelor of Business Administration (BBA).

In an effort to stop the spread of the COVID-19 pandemic in Brunei, several parties have continued to donate, including Lee, who gave T-shirts and monitors to the Ministry of Health.

== Honours and recognitions ==
Sixteen athletes, including Lee, received a total of B$48,900 on 15 June 2013, as payment for their exceptional 2012 regional and international tournament results. Pengiran Khairul Bahri and Siti Shazareena Hanifah, who each won $4,000, together with national wushu practitioners Lee and Woo, were declared the biggest winners by Minister Hazair. At an appreciation event on 11 January 2014, Lee and Woo received B$5,000 apiece, a just reward for capturing the nation's sole gold medal in Myanmar just a month earlier.

Lee in her 20 years old, received the "Excellent Youth Award" from Sultan Hassanal Bolkiah on 3 September 2014 during 9th National Youth Day, in recognition of winning the nation's first gold medal in wushu at the 27th SEA Games. The award is given to a young person who is actively involved, has shown exceptional service, and upholds the dignity of the nation. Additionally, it honours people who succeed and work diligently. She stated that while she was surprised to get the award, she did feel a little anxious and honoured to accept it from Sultan Hassanal Bolkiah. She plans to continue using wushu to benefit the nation. In addition, she was given woven cloth (kain tenunan), plaques, certificates, and B$3,000 in cash.

On 7 May 2016, Lee was one of the 636 recipients of state medals from a ceremony conducted at Istana Nurul Iman. As the youngest recipients, Lee received the Meritorious Service Medal for her achievements, which included winning a gold medal in wushu at the Myanmar 2013 SEA Games and receiving the Excellent Youth Award in 9th National Youth Day in 2014.

- Meritorious Service Medal (PJK; 7 May 2016)
- Inspire 50 Bruneian Women Who Shape Our Future (2014)
