= Brunei at the 2011 SEA Games =

Brunei at the 2011 Southeast Asian Games
- IOC code: BRU
- NOC: Brunei Darussalam National Olympic Council
- Website: www.bruneiolympic.org (in English)

in Jakarta and Palembang
- Competitors: 60
- Flag bearer: Ahmad Taufik Bin Murni (cue sports)
- Medals Ranked 11th: Gold 0 Silver 4 Bronze 7 Total 11

Southeast Asian Games appearances (overview)
- 1977; 1979; 1981; 1983; 1985; 1987; 1989; 1991; 1993; 1995; 1997; 1999; 2001; 2003; 2005; 2007; 2009; 2011; 2013; 2015; 2017; 2019; 2021; 2023; 2025; 2027; 2029

Brunei participated at the 2011 Southeast Asian Games which was held in the cities of Palembang and Jakarta, Indonesia from 11 November 2011 to 22 November 2011.

== Medals ==
=== Medal table ===
| Sport | Gold | Silver | Bronze | Total |
|---|---|---|---|---|
| Shorinji Kempo | 0 | 2 | 0 | 2 |
| Karate-Do | 0 | 1 | 2 | 3 |
| Wushu | 0 | 1 | 1 | 2 |
| Pencak Silat | 0 | 0 | 3 | 3 |
| Taekwondo | 0 | 0 | 1 | 1 |
| Total | 0 | 4 | 7 | 11 |

=== Medals by date ===
Daily: Overall Medals
| Day | Date | Gold medal | Silver medal | Bronze medal | Total |
| Day 1 | 11th | 0 | 0 | 0 | 0 |
| Day 2 | 12th | 0 | 0 | 1 | 1 |
| Day 3 | 13th | 0 | 1 | 1 | 2 |
| Day 4 | 14th | 0 | 0 | 1 | 1 |
| Day 5 | 15th | 0 | 0 | 3 | 3 |
| Day 6 | 16th | 0 | 0 | 0 | 0 |
| Day 7 | 17th | 0 | 0 | 0 | 0 |
| Day 8 | 18th | 0 | 1 | 1 | 2 |
| Day 9 | 19th | 0 | 0 | 0 | 0 |
| Day 10 | 20th | 0 | 1 | 0 | 1 |
| Day 11 | 21st | 0 | 1 | 0 | 1 |
| Day 12 | 22nd | 0 | 0 | 0 | 0 |

=== Medalists ===
| Medal | Name | Sport | Event |
|---|---|---|---|
| Silver | Mohamad Fadilah | Karate | Men's kumite 67 kg and below |
| Silver | Ali Alipah; Muhd Shamsul | Shorinji Kempo | Men's kumi embu pair yudansha |
| Silver | Muhd Shamsul; Rafidah Rosli; Ali Alipah; Dzulhusmie bin Haji Kahan | Shorinji Kempo | Mixed dantai embu group yudansha |
| Silver | Lee Ying Shi; Faustina Woo Wai Sii | Wushu | Women's duilian |
| Bronze | Abdul Malik bin Haji Ladi; Juffri bin Haji; Abdul Rahman bin Haji Asli | Pencak silat | Men's artistic team |
| Bronze | Norleyermah Haji; Norleyharyanti Haji; Nurul Aimi Amalina | Pencak silat | Women's artistic team |
| Bronze | Norleyermah Haji | Pencak silat | Women's artistic singles |
| Bronze | Mohammad Saifullah | Taekwondo | Men's gyeorugi welterweight (74–80 kg) |
| Bronze | Brunei | Karate | Team kumite |
| Bronze | Faustina Woo Wai Sii | Wushu | Nanquan |
