= Sailing at the 2011 SEA Games =

== Medal table ==
* Host nation (Indonesia)

| Rank | Nation | Gold | Silver | Bronze | Total |
|---|---|---|---|---|---|
| 1 | Thailand | 4 | 3 | 1 | 8 |
| 2 | Singapore | 4 | 1 | 3 | 8 |
| 3 | Indonesia* | 1 | 2 | 1 | 4 |
| 4 | Malaysia | 0 | 1 | 3 | 4 |
| 5 | Philippines | 0 | 1 | 1 | 2 |
| 6 | Myanmar | 0 | 1 | 0 | 1 |
| Totals (6 entries) | | 9 | 9 | 9 | 27 |

== Medal summary ==
=== Men ===
| Event | Gold | Silver | Bronze |
|---|---|---|---|
| International 470 | Singapore; Russell Kan Tsung Liang; Terence Koh Seng Kiat | Philippines; Ridgely Balladares; Chavez Rommel | Malaysia; Ku Anas Ku Zamil; Mohamad Hafizzudin |
| Laser radial | Keerati Bualong; Thailand | Mohd Romzi Muhamad; Malaysia | Terence Choo Jian Jie; Singapore |
| Mistral One Design | Navin Singsrart; Thailand | I Gusti Made Oka Sulaksana; Indonesia | Geylord Coveta; Philippines |
| RS:X | Ek Boonsawad; Thailand | I Nyoman Suartana; Indonesia | Leonard Ong; Singapore |

=== Women ===
| Event | Gold | Silver | Bronze |
|---|---|---|---|
| International 470 | Singapore; Dawn Liu Xiaodan; Sara Tan Li Ching | Myanmar; Khin Nyo Lynn; Theingi Win Shwe | Thailand; Narisara Yu-Sawat; Yupa Suwannawat |
| Laser radial | Victoria Chan Jing Hua; Singapore | Kamolwan Chanyim; Thailand | Nur Amirah Hamid; Malaysia |
| Mistral One Design | Rio Hoiriyah; Indonesia | Napalai Tansai; Thailand | Amanda Ng; Singapore |
| RS:X | Siripon Kaewduang-ngam; Thailand | Audrey Pei Lin Young; Singapore | Ratiah; Indonesia |

=== Mixed ===
| Event | Gold | Silver | Bronze |
|---|---|---|---|
| Optimist | Elisa Yukie Yokoyama; Singapore | Sarawut Phetsiri; Thailand | Ahmad Syukri Abdul Aziz; Malaysia |
