= Pétanque at the 2011 SEA Games =

Petanque at the 2011 SEA Games

Pétanque in the 26th SEA Games were held in Palembang, Indonesia, from 12 to 17 November 2011. A total of 6 events are held at Jakabaring Sport Complex.

== Medal summary ==
=== Men ===
Event	Gold	Silver	Bronze
Singles	Supan Thongphoo; Thailand	Dhan Sa Phanl; Vietnam	Sok Chan Mean; Cambodia
Singles	Supan Thongphoo; Thailand	Dhan Sa Phanl; Vietnam	Ahmad Safwan Ibrahim; Malaysia
Doubles	Cambodia (CAM); Or Chan Daren; Yim Sophorn	Vietnam (VIE); Huynh Cong Tam; Nguyen Van Dung	Malaysia (MAS); M. Hakem bin Ahmed Saberi; M. Hafizuddin bin Mat Daud
Doubles	Cambodia (CAM); Or Chan Daren; Yim Sophorn	Vietnam (VIE); Huynh Cong Tam; Nguyen Van Dung	Thailand (THA); Thaloengkiat Phusa-at; Suksan Piachan
Shooting	Sarawut Sriboonpeng; Thailand	Phung Ba Phi Long; Vietnam	Khamphavong Vathanaxay; Laos
Shooting	Sarawut Sriboonpeng; Thailand	Phung Ba Phi Long; Vietnam	Mohd Faiza bin Mohamad; Malaysia

=== Women ===
Event	Gold	Silver	Bronze
Singles	Meuanduangpanya Souksakhone; Laos	Aumpawan Suwannaphruk; Thailand	Suhartisera binti Zamri; Malaysia
Singles	Meuanduangpanya Souksakhone; Laos	Aumpawan Suwannaphruk; Thailand	Thai Thi Hang; Vietnam
Doubles	Thailand (THA); Thongsri Thamakord; Phantipha Wongchuvej	Cambodia (CAM); Duong Dina; Oum Chantrea	Laos (LAO); Khoun Souksavat; Vongsavhas Chansamon
Doubles	Thailand (THA); Thongsri Thamakord; Phantipha Wongchuvej	Cambodia (CAM); Duong Dina; Oum Chantrea	Vietnam (VIE); Vu Thi Thu; Nguyen Thi Trang
Shooting	Manyvahn; Laos	Tran Thi Phuong Em; Vietnam	Ke Leng; Cambodia
Shooting	Manyvahn; Laos	Tran Thi Phuong Em; Vietnam	Tida Buabao; Thailand

== Medal table ==
Rank	Nation	Gold	Silver	Bronze	Total
1	Thailand	3	1	2	6
2	Laos	2	0	2	4
3	Cambodia	1	1	2	4
4	Vietnam	0	4	2	6
5	Malaysia	0	0	4	4
Totals (5 entries)		6	6	12	24
