= Wushu at the 2011 SEA Games =

- Venue: Istora Senayan
- Dates: 17-20 November 2011

Wushu at the 2011 SEA Games was held at Istora Senayan, Jakarta.

== Medal table ==
* Host nation (Indonesia)

Rank	Nation	Gold	Silver	Bronze	Total
1	Indonesia*	8	3	3	14
2	Vietnam	4	3	5	12
3	Malaysia	3	3	5	11
4	Philippines	2	4	3	9
5	Myanmar	1	2	3	6
6	Thailand	1	0	3	4
7	Singapore	1	0	2	3
8	Laos	0	4	1	5
9	Brunei	0	1	1	2
10	Cambodia	0	0	1	1
Totals (10 entries)		20	20	27	67

== Medalists ==
=== Men's taolu ===
Event	Gold	Silver	Bronze
Chanquan	Aldy Lukman; Indonesia	Trần Xuân Hiệp; Vietnam	Achmad Hulaefi; Indonesia
Nanquan	Heryanto; Indonesia	Phạm Quốc Khánh; Vietnam	Kevan Cheah Peng; Malaysia
Daoshu / Gunshu	Achmad Hulaefi; Indonesia	Nguyễn Mạnh Quyền; Vietnam	Ong Shi Chuan; Malaysia
Nandao / Nangun	Kevan Cheah Peng; Malaysia	Koo Chee Zhong; Malaysia	Wai Phyo Aung; Myanmar
Taijiquan / Taijijian	Lee Yang; Malaysia	Daniel Parantac; Philippines	Nguyễn Thanh Tùng; Vietnam
Duilian	Myanmar; Kyaw Zin Thet; Wai Phyo Aung	Philippines; John Keithley Chan; Engelbert Addongan; Eleazar Jacob	Singapore; Jaryl Tay Wei Sheng; Fung Jin Jie; Samuel Seah Kah Yeap

=== Men's sanshou ===
Event	Gold	Silver	Bronze
52 kg	Phithak Paokrathok; Thailand	Khamla Soukaphone; Laos	Dembert Arcita; Philippines
52 kg	Phithak Paokrathok; Thailand	Khamla Soukaphone; Laos	Trần Văn Kiên; Vietnam
56 kg	Phan Văn Hậu; Vietnam	Benjie Rivera; Philippines	Yusak Kristiawan; Indonesia
56 kg	Phan Văn Hậu; Vietnam	Benjie Rivera; Philippines	Prasongsuk Khainchatturat; Thailand
60 kg	Mukhlis; Indonesia	Phoxay Aphaylath; Laos	Veng Vi Reak; Cambodia
60 kg	Mukhlis; Indonesia	Phoxay Aphaylath; Laos	Supachai Laorueang; Thailand
65 kg	Mark Eddiva; Philippines	Youne Victorio Senduk; Indonesia	Tin Lin Aung; Myanmar
65 kg	Mark Eddiva; Philippines	Youne Victorio Senduk; Indonesia	Le Van The; Vietnam
70 kg	Eduard Folayang; Philippines	Udon Khanxay; Laos	Agus Suprayitno; Indonesia
70 kg	Eduard Folayang; Philippines	Udon Khanxay; Laos	Wong Wei Jian; Malaysia

=== Women's taolu ===
Event	Gold	Silver	Bronze
Changquan	Nguyễn Mai Phương; Vietnam	Susyana Tjhan; Indonesia	Hoang Thi Phuong Giang; Vietnam
Nanquan	Ivana Adelia Irmanto; Indonesia	Tai Cheau Xuen; Malaysia	Faustina Woo Wai Sii; Brunei
Jianshu / Qiangshu	Susyana Tjhan; Indonesia	Sandi Oo; Myanmar	Dương Thúy Vi; Vietnam
Nandao / Nangun	Tai Cheau Xuen; Malaysia	Dessy Indri Astuti; Indonesia	Diana Bong Siong Lin; Malaysia
Taijiquan / Taijijian	Lindswell Kwok; Indonesia	Ng Shin Yii; Malaysia	Valerie Wee Ling En; Singapore
Duilian	Singapore; Tao Yi Jun; Emily Sin Min Li; Tay Yu Juan	Brunei; Lee Ying Shi; Faustina Woo Wai Sii	Philippines; Nastasha Enriquez; Kathylynne Sabalburo; Kariza Kris Chan

=== Women's sanshou ===
Event	Gold	Silver	Bronze
48 kg	Nguyễn Thị Bích; Vietnam	Hla Hla Win; Myanmar	Rhea May Rifani; Philippines
48 kg	Nguyễn Thị Bích; Vietnam	Hla Hla Win; Myanmar	Chutdao Chaimala; Thailand
56 kg	Tân Thị Lý; Vietnam	Mariane Mariano; Philippines	Douangchay Thalengliep; Laos
56 kg	Tân Thị Lý; Vietnam	Mariane Mariano; Philippines	Su Hlaing Oo; Myanmar
60 kg	Moria Manalu; Indonesia	Paloy Barckkam; Laos	Pei Pin Tang; Malaysia

Preceded by 2009	Wushu at the SEA Games; 2011 SEA Games	Succeeded by 2013
