= Taekwondo at the 2011 SEA Games =

Taekwondo competition

Taekwondo at the 2011 Southeast Asian Games was held in POPKI Sport Hall, Cibubur, Indonesia.

== Medal summary ==
=== Poomsae ===
| Event | Gold | Silver | Bronze |
|---|---|---|---|
| Men's individual | Daniel Danny Harsono; Indonesia | Nguyễn Đình Toàn; Vietnam | Samuel Lee Wei Kang; Singapore |
| Men's individual | Daniel Danny Harsono; Indonesia | Nguyễn Đình Toàn; Vietnam | Marvin Gabriel Vidal; Philippines |
| Women's individual | Lessitra Draningrati; Indonesia | Joyce Lim Soon Yi; Singapore | Ya Min K-Khine; Myanmar |
| Women's individual | Lessitra Draningrati; Indonesia | Joyce Lim Soon Yi; Singapore | Pich-chapha Tanakitcharoenpat; Thailand |
| Men's team | Indonesia; Daniel Danny Harsono; Asep Santoso; Muhamad Fazza Fitracahyanto | Thailand; Attarnontwong Kittimapron; Naravich Rujirarotchanakorn; Noppol Pitukwongdeengam | Laos; Sengmany Vilayvone; Panyasit Bounheng; Manirard Soukthavone |
| Men's team | Indonesia; Daniel Danny Harsono; Asep Santoso; Muhamad Fazza Fitracahyanto | Thailand; Attarnontwong Kittimapron; Naravich Rujirarotchanakorn; Noppol Pitukwongdeengam | Singapore; Samuel Lee Kang Wei; Jason Tan Jun Wei; Muhammad Norhalim |
| Women's team | Philippines; Rani Ann Ortega; Francesca Camille Lagman Alarilla; Ma. Carla Janice Lagman | Vietnam; Châu Tuyết Vân; Nguyễn Thị Lệ Kim; Nguyễn Thị Thu Ngân | not awarded |
| Mixed pair | Vietnam; Nguyễn Đình Toàn; Nguyễn Minh Tú | Philippines; Marvin Gabriel Vidal; Shaneen Sia | Laos; Soukthavy Panyasit; Ounvongsa Nola |
| Mixed pair | Vietnam; Nguyễn Đình Toàn; Nguyễn Minh Tú | Philippines; Marvin Gabriel Vidal; Shaneen Sia | Malaysia; Ahmady Rady; Morren Urai Lian |

=== Gyeorugi ===
==== Men ====
| Event | Gold | Silver | Bronze |
|---|---|---|---|
| Finweight; 54 kg | Chutchawal Khawlaor; Thailand | Naing Dwe Shein; Myanmar | Nguyễn Hữu Nhân; Vietnam |
| Finweight; 54 kg | Chutchawal Khawlaor; Thailand | Naing Dwe Shein; Myanmar | Ahmad Nabil Faqih; Indonesia |
| Flyweight; 58 kg | Japoy Lizardo; Philippines | Jerranat Nakaviroj; Thailand | Phimmasone Douangsivilay; Laos |
| Flyweight; 58 kg | Japoy Lizardo; Philippines | Jerranat Nakaviroj; Thailand | Jason Tan Jun We; Singapore |
| Bantamweight; 63 kg | Mangkheua Sonexa; Laos | Rusfredy Petrus; Malaysia | Pen-ek Karaket; Thailand |
| Bantamweight; 63 kg | Mangkheua Sonexa; Laos | Rusfredy Petrus; Malaysia | Merry Wandra; Indonesia |
| Featherweight; 68 kg | Kongpon Koomkron; Thailand | Thammavong Phouthasone; Laos | Samuel Morrison; Philippines |
| Featherweight; 68 kg | Kongpon Koomkron; Thailand | Thammavong Phouthasone; Laos | Afifuddin Omar Sidek; Malaysia |
| Lightweight; 74 kg | Dương Thanh Tâm; Vietnam | Peerathep Sila-on; Thailand | Vannavong Saysana; Laos |
| Lightweight; 74 kg | Dương Thanh Tâm; Vietnam | Peerathep Sila-on; Thailand | Yulius Fernando; Indonesia |
| Welterweight; 80 kg | Nattapat Tantramart; Thailand | Sawatvilay Phimmasone; Laos | Võ Hoàng Giao; Vietnam |
| Welterweight; 80 kg | Nattapat Tantramart; Thailand | Sawatvilay Phimmasone; Laos | Mohammad Saifullah; Brunei |
| Middleweight; 87 kg | Basuki Nugroho; Indonesia | Jose Anthony Soriano; Philippines | Nguyễn Trọng Cường; Vietnam |
| Middleweight; 87 kg | Basuki Nugroho; Indonesia | Jose Anthony Soriano; Philippines | Phon Virak; Cambodia |
| Heavyweight +87 kg | Rizal Samsir; Indonesia | Alexander Briones; Philippines | Đinh Quang Đức; Vietnam |

==== Women ====
| Event | Gold | Silver | Bronze |
|---|---|---|---|
| Finweight; 46 kg | Fransisca Valentina; Indonesia | Nurul Asfahlina; Malaysia | Luisa dos Santos Rosa; Timor-Leste |
| Finweight; 46 kg | Fransisca Valentina; Indonesia | Nurul Asfahlina; Malaysia | Leigh Anne Nuguid; Philippines |
| Flyweight; 49 kg | Apitchaya Chaikaew; Thailand | Trương Thị Nhớ; Vietnam | Pauline Lopez; Philippines |
| Flyweight; 49 kg | Apitchaya Chaikaew; Thailand | Trương Thị Nhớ; Vietnam | Khounviseth Manivanh; Laos |
| Bantamweight; 53 kg | Sarita Phongsri; Thailand | Siska Permata Sari; Indonesia | Chhoeung Puthearim; Cambodia |
| Bantamweight; 53 kg | Sarita Phongsri; Thailand | Siska Permata Sari; Indonesia | Đoàn Thị Hương Giang; Vietnam |
| Featherweight; 57 kg | Worawong Pongpanit; Thailand | Lia Karina Mansur; Indonesia | Nguyễn Thị Hoài Thu; Vietnam |
| Featherweight; 57 kg | Worawong Pongpanit; Thailand | Lia Karina Mansur; Indonesia | Karla Avala; Philippines |
| Lightweight; 62 kg | Maria Camille Manalo; Philippines | Nguyễn Thanh Thảo; Vietnam | Vony Dian Permata Sari; Indonesia |
| Lightweight; 62 kg | Maria Camille Manalo; Philippines | Nguyễn Thanh Thảo; Vietnam | Sorn Seavmey; Cambodia |
| Welterweight; 67 kg | Dhunyanun Premwaew; Thailand | Mathmanisone Valy; Laos | Ywet Wah Htun; Myanmar |
| Welterweight; 67 kg | Dhunyanun Premwaew; Thailand | Mathmanisone Valy; Laos | Chu Hoàng Diệu Linh; Vietnam |
| Middleweight; 73 kg | Hà Thị Nguyên; Vietnam | Sorn Davin; Cambodia | Jacquelin Quek Jie Lin; Singapore |
| Middleweight; 73 kg | Hà Thị Nguyên; Vietnam | Sorn Davin; Cambodia | Catur Yuni Riyaningsih; Indonesia |
| Heavyweight +73 kg | Kirstie Alora; Philippines | Eka Sahara; Indonesia | not awarded |

== Medal table ==
* Host nation (Indonesia)

| Rank | Nation | Gold | Silver | Bronze | Total |
|---|---|---|---|---|---|
| 1 | Thailand (THA) | 7 | 3 | 2 | 12 |
| 2 | Indonesia (INA)* | 6 | 3 | 5 | 14 |
| 3 | Philippines (PHI) | 4 | 3 | 5 | 12 |
| 4 | Vietnam (VIE) | 3 | 5 | 6 | 14 |
| 5 | Laos (LAO) | 1 | 3 | 5 | 9 |
| 6 | Malaysia (MAS) | 0 | 2 | 2 | 4 |
| 7 | Singapore (SIN) | 0 | 1 | 4 | 5 |
| 8 | Cambodia (CAM) | 0 | 1 | 3 | 4 |
| 9 | Myanmar (MYA) | 0 | 1 | 2 | 3 |
| 10 | Brunei (BRU) | 0 | 0 | 1 | 1 |
| 10 | Timor-Leste (TLS) | 0 | 0 | 1 | 1 |
| Totals (11 entries) | | 21 | 22 | 36 | 79 |
