= Faustina Woo Wai Sii =

Bruneian wushu athlete (born 1992)

Personal information
- Born: Faustina Woo Wai Sii; 21 June 1992 (age 34) Brunei
- Occupation(s): Martial artist, athlete
- Height: 155 cm (5 ft 1 in)
- Weight: 44 kg (97 lb; 6 st 13 lb)

Sport
- Sport: Wushu
- Event(s): Nanquan, Nangun, Nandao and Duilian
- Team: Brunei Wushu Team
- Coached by: Li Hui
Medal record
Women's Wushu Taolu
Representing Brunei
Asian Indoor Games
Bronze medal – third place	2009 Hanoi	duilian
SEA Games
Gold medal – first place	2013 Naypyidaw	duilian
Silver medal – second place	2011 Jakarta	duilian
Silver medal – second place	2009 Vientiane	duilian
Bronze medal – third place	2015 Singapore	duilian
Bronze medal – third place	2011 Jakarta	nanquan
World Junior Wushu Championships
Silver medal – second place	2010 Singapore	duilian
Bronze medal – third place	2010 Singapore	nanquan
Asian Wushu Championships
Gold medal – first place	2012 Ho Chi Minh City	duilian
Asian Junior Championships
Bronze medal – third place	2009 Macau	duilian

Faustina Woo Wai Sii
- Simplified Chinese: 胡惠诗
- Traditional Chinese: 胡惠詩
Transcriptions
Standard Mandarin
- Hanyu Pinyin: Hú Huìshī
Yue: Cantonese
- Jyutping: Wu4 Wai6si1

Faustina Woo Wai Sii (Chinese: 胡惠诗; pinyin: Hú Huìshī; born 21 June 1992) is a retired Bruneian wushu athlete of Chinese descent specialising in tai chi.

== Career ==
It was the first time the sultanate had taken home a medal in an international Wushu tournament when Woo and Lee Ying Shi took home the bronze at the 5th Asian Junior Wushu Championships in Macau, China, in June 2009.

In Vietnam, at the 3rd Asian Indoor Games, the Bruneian pair took home bronze. On 7 November 2009, Woo and Lee tied for third place with Indonesia in the women's single weapon vs. weapon competition, scoring 9.40 at the Trinh Hoai Duc Gymnasium.

At the 25th SEA Games in Vientiane, Woo and Lee won Brunei's first and only silver medal. On 13 December 2009, at the Lao International Trade Exhibition and Convention Centre, the pair won Brunei's first silver medal. In the women's duilian event, they received 9.45 points, splitting the silver medal with Vietnam, who received the same score from the judges.

The 4th World Traditional Wushu Championships (WTWC), which began on 16 October 2010, in Shiyan, China, was Brunei's second participation in the four-day competition. Six medallists, including Woo and Lee, spearheaded the nation's effort. The pair won the gold medal at the tournament.

On 10 November 2010, Woo was a torchbearer during the 2010 Asian Games torch relay at Dafushan. In Guangzhou, China, she was a member of the Bruneian delegation at the 16th Asian Games. Although she competed in the changquan competition, she did not win any medals.

After competing in the 3rd World Junior Wushu Championships in Singapore, Woo and Lee demonstrated Brunei's competitiveness on the global arena. On 7 December 2010, Woo won Brunei's first medal in the women's Group A nanquan event, finishing in third position. The next day at the Jurong East Sports & Cultural Centre, Woo and Lee finished second in the women's Group A (16–18 years old) duilian competition. The Bruneian pair had 9.45 points, just losing out on gold to Vietnam's 9.51 points, earning the pair a silver medal.

At the 6th Asian Junior Wushu Championships in Shanghai, China, due to age constraints, 19-year-old Woo was unable to compete in this competition, which included Under-18 competitors from 24 different nations.

On 18 November 2011, during the 26th SEA Games, Woo earned a bronze medal in the nanquan event after achieving 9.48 points. Despite this, she placed fifth in the nandao event the next day. The Bruneian pair received silver in the discipline after scoring 9.70 points, which was only 0.01 points less than Singapore's 9.71 points for gold, held at the Tennis Indoor Senayan. Without a gold medal, the pair finished the 12-day regional sports competition at the bottom of the 11-nation standings. In the six-entry nangun event on the 20th, Woo came in last.

At the 8th Asian Wushu Championships in Vietnam on 25 August 2012, the Brunei delegation's greatest accomplishment to date was achieved by Woo and Lee, who won the gold medal in women's duilian. At the Phú Thọ Indoor Stadium in Ho Chi Minh City, the two came in first with 9.59 points, barely beating out Hong Kong with 9.58 points.

On 10 December 2013, Brunei finally won gold in the women's duilian event at the 27th SEA Games, putting a stop to four years of heartache. Singapore finished second to them in both the 2009 Laos and 2011 Indonesia SEA Games, both by a margin of 0.01 points. However, at the 2013 edition in Myanmar, the positions are intriguingly flipped, with Woo and Lee scoring 9.67 to defeat Singapore by the same margin of 0.01 points. When Prince Sufri Bolkiah visited Team Brunei at the Athletes Village, he complimented both medalists.

On 30 September 2015, Woo underwent successful surgery in Beijing with the backing of the Bruneian government to repair her ruptured anterior cruciate ligament, which resulted from a knee injury that had caused suffering for two years. Peking University Third Hospital Beijing conducted the procedure with the assistance of the Bruneian authorities.

Leading coach Li Hui, Brunei's wushu athletes returned to their home nation on 29 November 2017, having just finished the 4th China-ASEAN Wushu Festival in Guangxi, Guilin, China. Four athletes on the team won a total of five medals: Mohd Adi Salihin Roslan won a bronze in the nanquan event and a gold in the nandao event; Woo won a gold medal in the nangun event; Hosea Wong won two silver medals in the taijiquan and taijian events; and Nur Batrisya binti Ripin took home a silver medal in the nanquan event.

Lee and Woo participated in women's duilian at the 28th SEA Games, which were held from June 6–8, 2015, at Singapore Expo Hall 2 in Tampines. With 9.64 points, the Bruneian pair took home the bronze.

== Later life ==
At the recent annual general meeting of the Brunei Darussalam Wushu Federation, which was conducted to choose new executive committee members for the 2023–2026 period, six directors, including Woo, were selected.

== Honours and recognitions ==
On 15 June 2013, a total of B$48,900 was awarded to sixteen athletes, including Woo, as compensation for their outstanding performances in regional and international competitions in 2012. Minister Hazair announced that Pengiran Khairul Bahri and Siti Shazareena Hanifah, who each received $4,000, were the largest winners, along with national wushu practitioners Woo and Lee.

Woo was among the 636 people who received state medals on 7 May 2016, during a ceremony held at Istana Nurul Iman. One of the youngest awardees, Woo was awarded the Excellent Service Medal in recognition of her accomplishments, which included earning a gold medal in Wushu at the 2013 SEA Games in Myanmar. She was working with a Youth and Sports Department coaching unit at the time she received the prize. Additionally, Woo was among the nine athletes honoured at the Sports Excellence Promotion Scheme (SPKS) Award Ceremony on 5 October 2019.

- Excellent Service Medal (PIKB; 7 May 2016)
- Inspire 50 Bruneian Women Who Shape Our Future (2014)
