= Pencak silat at the 2011 SEA Games =

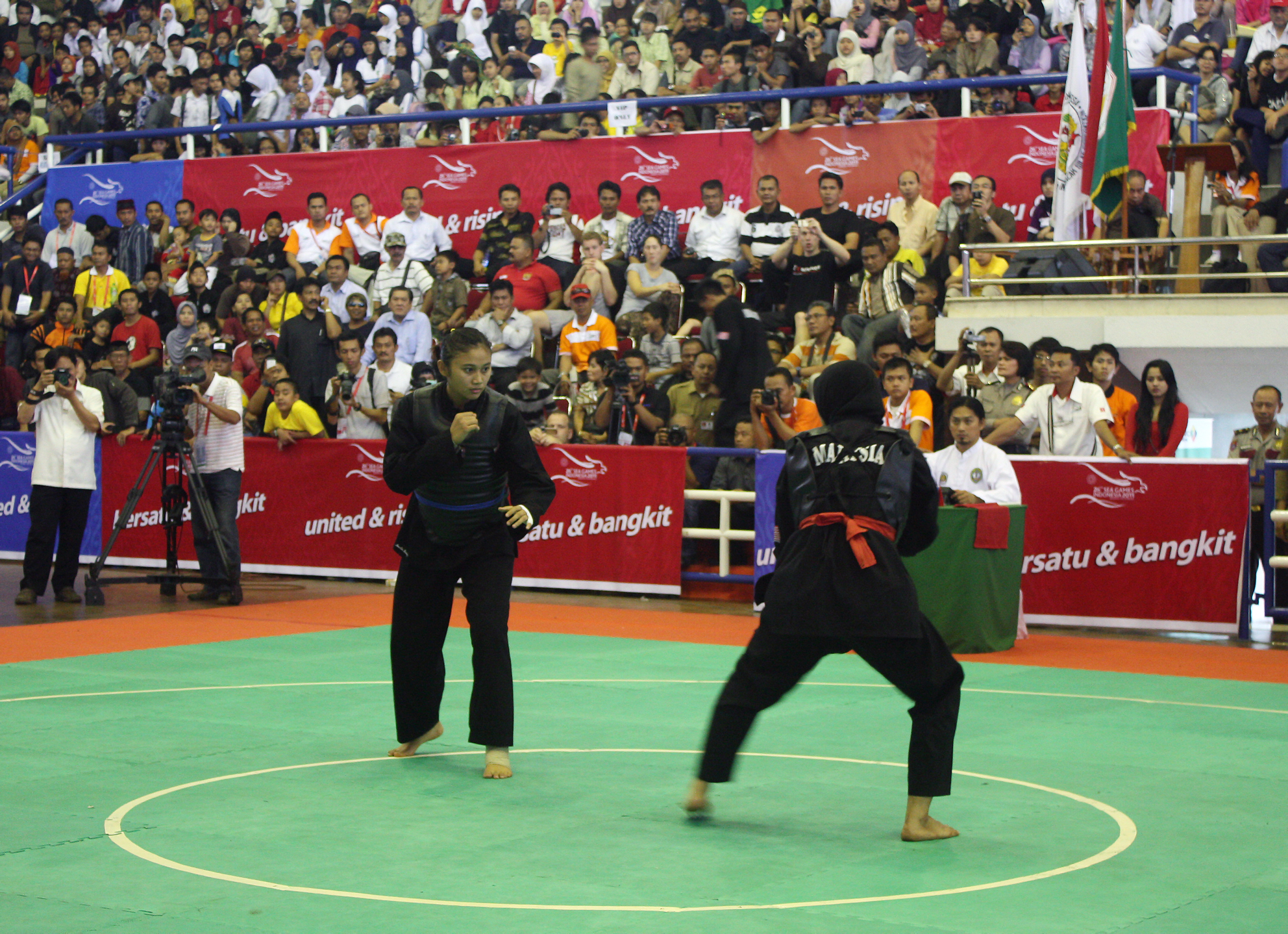
The Pencak Silat women's tarung class E 70 kg, Indonesian Amelia Roring vs Malaysian Siti Rahmah, final match at the 2011 SEA Games.

Pencak silat at the 2011 SEA Games was held at Padepokan Pencak Silat Taman Mini Indonesia Indah, Jakarta.

== Medal summary ==
=== Artistic ===
Event	Gold	Silver	Bronze
Men's singles	Eko Wahyudi; Indonesia	Hoàng Quang Trung; Vietnam	Tajul Zaman; Malaysia
Women's singles	Tuti Winarni; Indonesia	Nguyễn Thị Thúy; Vietnam	Norleyermah Haji Raya; Brunei
Men's doubles	Indonesia; Hamdani; Mochamad Yusuf Effendi	Vietnam; Nguyễn Hữu Tuấn; Nguyễn Thanh Tùng	Singapore; Muhammad Danial; Muhammad Azri Abdullah
Women's doubles	Indonesia; Sang Ayu Ketut Sidan Wilantari; Ni Made Dwi Yanti	Vietnam; Nguyễn Thị My; Nguyễn Thị Lan	Malaysia; Kamilah Sulong; Siti Arfiyah Abdul Jalil
Men's team	Indonesia; Zakki Imaduddin; Exa Purbianto; Abdul Muqit Irsyat	Vietnam; Nguyễn Thanh Tùng; Nguyễn Tiến Tài; Nguyễn Hữu Tuấn	Brunei; Abdul Malik Haji Ladi; Juffri Haji Junaidi; Abdul Rahman Haji Asli
Women's team	Indonesia; Kikih Dyahayuwati; Djuriah; Yuli Anriani	Vietnam; Nguyễn Thị Thúy; Phạm Thị Hà; Ngô Thị Quyên	Brunei; Norleyermah Haji Raya; Norleyharyanti Haji Raya; Nurul Aimi Amalina Zainidi

=== Tarung ===
==== Men ====
Event	Gold	Silver	Bronze
Class A 50 kg	Dian Kristianto; Indonesia	Anothai Choopeng; Thailand	Mohd Hafiz Mahri; Malaysia
Class A 50 kg	Dian Kristianto; Indonesia	Anothai Choopeng; Thailand	Diệp Ngọc Vũ Minh; Vietnam
Class B 55 kg	Võ Duy Phương; Vietnam	Jul-omar Abdulhakim; Philippines	Thitsaphone Khamphi; Thailand
Class B 55 kg	Võ Duy Phương; Vietnam	Jul-omar Abdulhakim; Philippines	Denny Aprisani; Indonesia
Class C 60 kg	Trần Văn Toàn; Vietnam	Anurak Pakkaranang; Thailand	Christopher Yabut; Philippines
Class C 60 kg	Trần Văn Toàn; Vietnam	Anurak Pakkaranang; Thailand	M. Ichsan Nur Romad; Indonesia
Class D 65 kg	Ahmad Shahril Zailudin; Malaysia	Sapto Purnomo; Indonesia	Sarawut Comepoon; Thailand
Class D 65 kg	Ahmad Shahril Zailudin; Malaysia	Sapto Purnomo; Indonesia	Nguyễn Bá Trình; Vietnam
Class E 70 kg	Al Jufferi Jamari; Malaysia	Nguyễn Duy Tiến; Vietnam	Wattara Thammachuto; Thailand
Class E 70 kg	Al Jufferi Jamari; Malaysia	Nguyễn Duy Tiến; Vietnam	Mohd Saifullah Julaimi; Singapore
Class F 75 kg	Mohd Fauzi bin Khalid; Malaysia	Katahat Raksapon; Thailand	Phạm Văn Chí; Vietnam
Class F 75 kg	Mohd Fauzi bin Khalid; Malaysia	Katahat Raksapon; Thailand	Ronald Perena; Philippines
Class I 90 kg	Lê Đăng Minh; Vietnam	Pranoto; Indonesia	Azrul Abdullah; Malaysia
Class I 90 kg	Lê Đăng Minh; Vietnam	Pranoto; Indonesia	Muhammad Shakir Juanda; Singapore

==== Women ====
Event	Gold	Silver	Bronze
Class B 55 kg	Nguyễn Hương Xuân; Vietnam	Tuti Trisnayanti; Indonesia	Noor Farahana Ismail; Malaysia
Class B 55 kg	Nguyễn Hương Xuân; Vietnam	Tuti Trisnayanti; Indonesia	Wai Wai Lwin; Myanmar
Class C 60 kg	Rosmayani; Indonesia	Jutarat Noytapa; Thailand	Nerlyn Huinda; Philippines
Class C 60 kg	Rosmayani; Indonesia	Jutarat Noytapa; Thailand	Nguyễn Thị Giang; Vietnam
Class D 65 kg	Nguyễn Thị Yến; Vietnam	Mariati; Indonesia	Mastura Sapuan; Malaysia
Class D 65 kg	Nguyễn Thị Yến; Vietnam	Mariati; Indonesia	Rawadee Damsri; Thailand
Class E 70 kg	Amelia Roring; Indonesia	Siti Rahmah Nasir; Malaysia	Hay Mar Oo; Myanmar
Class E 70 kg	Amelia Roring; Indonesia	Siti Rahmah Nasir; Malaysia	Trần Thùy Minh Lý; Vietnam
Class F 75 kg	Trần Thị Luyến; Vietnam	Sofani Rakhmawati; Indonesia	Siti Khadijah Shahrem; Malaysia
Class F 75 kg	Trần Thị Luyến; Vietnam	Sofani Rakhmawati; Indonesia	Thin Myat Aye; Myanmar

== Medal table ==
* Host nation (Indonesia)

Rank	Nation	Gold	Silver	Bronze	Total
1	Indonesia (INA)*	9	5	2	16
2	Vietnam (VIE)	6	7	5	18
3	Malaysia (MAS)	3	1	7	11
4	Thailand (THA)	0	4	4	8
5	Philippines (PHI)	0	1	3	4
6	Brunei (BRU)	0	0	3	3
6	Myanmar (MYA)	0	0	3	3
6	Singapore (SIN)	0	0	3	3
Totals (8 entries)		18	18	30	66
