= Vietnam at the 2011 SEA Games =

Vietnam at the 2011 Southeast Asian Games
- IOC code: VIE
- NOC: Vietnam Olympic Committee
- Website: voc.org.vn/en-us/home.aspx (in Vietnamese and English)

in Jakarta and Palembang
- Competitors: 608 in 36 sports
- Officials: 260
- Medals Ranked 3rd: Gold 96 Silver 92 Bronze 100 Total 288

Southeast Asian Games appearances (overview)
- 1989; 1991; 1993; 1995; 1997; 1999; 2001; 2003; 2005; 2007; 2009; 2011; 2013; 2015; 2017; 2019; 2021; 2023; 2025; 2027; 2029

Vietnam participated at the 2011 Southeast Asian Games which were being held in the cities of Palembang and Jakarta, Indonesia from 11 November 2011 to 22 November 2011.

== Medal summary ==
Medals by sport
Sport	1st place, gold medalist(s)	2nd place, silver medalist(s)	3rd place, bronze medalist(s)	Total	Rank
Archery	0	1	0	1	6
Athletics	9	9	14	32	3
Aquatics	4	5	2	11	5
Billiards and snooker	2	1	5	8	2
Boxing	1	5	2	8	4
Canoeing	2	0	5	7	4
Chess	6	2	2	10	1
Competition Climbing	0	1	0	1	6
Cycling	1	0	1	2	5
Fencing	5	4	3	12	1
Finswimming	6	5	6	17	2
Gymnastics	12	5	4	21	1
Judo	4	2	5	11	3
Karate	3	8	3	14	3
Shorinji Kempo	4	3	6	13	2
Pencak silat	6	7	5	18	2
Pétanque	0	4	2	6	4
Rowing	3	4	2	9	1
Sepak takraw	1	1	0	2	
Shooting	7	3	3	13	1
Table Tennis	0	0	4	4	3
Taekwondo	3	5	6	14	4
Tennis	0	0	3	3	4
Vovinam	5	7	2	14	1
Weightlifting	1	2	6	9	3
Wushu	4	3	5	12	2
Total	96	92	100	288	3

== See also ==
- Vietnam at the 2009 Southeast Asian Games
- Vietnam at the 2007 Southeast Asian Games
- Vietnam at the 2005 Southeast Asian Games
