= Myanmar at the 2011 SEA Games =

Myanmar at the 2011 Southeast Asian Games
- IOC code: MYA
- NOC: Myanmar Olympic Committee

in Jakarta and Palembang
- Competitors: 477
- Officials: 246
- Medals Ranked 7th: Gold 16 Silver 27 Bronze 37 Total 80

Southeast Asian Games appearances (overview)
- 1959; 1961; 1965; 1967; 1969; 1971; 1973; 1975; 1977; 1979; 1981; 1983; 1985; 1987; 1989; 1991; 1993; 1995; 1997; 1999; 2001; 2003; 2005; 2007; 2009; 2011; 2013; 2015; 2017; 2019; 2021; 2023; 2025; 2027; 2029

Myanmar is participating at the 2011 Southeast Asian Games which are being held in the cities of Palembang and Jakarta, Indonesia from 11 November 2011 to 22 November 2011.

== Medals ==
=== Medal table ===
Sport	Gold	Silver	Bronze	Total
Traditional Boat Race	9	1	0	10
Archery	2	2	7	11
Judo	1	6	2	9
Wushu	1	2	3	6
Rowing	1	2	1	4
Sepak-Takraw	1	1	2	4
Boxing	0	3	4	7
Canoeing	0	3	2	5
Athletics	0	3	1	4
Billiards and Snooker	0	1	4	5
Karate-Do	0	1	2	3
Taekwondo	0	1	2	3
Sailing	0	1	0	1
Chess	0	1	0	1
Pencak Silat	0	0	3	3
Equestrian	0	0	2	2
Volleyball	0	0	1	1
Diving	0	0	1	1
Football	0	0	1	1
Weightlifting	0	0	1	1
Shooting	0	0	1	1
Futsal	0	0	1	1
Total	16	27	37	80

=== Medals by date ===
Daily: Overall Medals
Day	Date	Gold medal	Silver medal	Bronze medal	Total
Day 1	11th	0	2	0	2
Day 2	12th	0	1	3	4
Day 3	13th	0	2	6	8
Day 4	14th	0	3	1	4
Day 5	15th	0	1	5	6
Day 6	16th	1	3	1	5
Day 7	17th	2	1	7	10
Day 8	18th	1	2	7	10
Day 9	19th	4	4	1	9
Day 10	20th	4	4	5	13
Day 11	21st	4	4	1	9
Day 12	22nd	0	0	0	0
