= Adrian Ang =

Malaysian ten-pin bowler (born 1988)

Personal information
- Full name: Adrian Ang Hsien Loong
- Born: 16 July 1988 (age 37) Penang, Malaysia

Sport
- Sport: Bowling
Medal record
Representing Malaysia
Men's Bowling
Asian Games
Gold medal – first place	2010 Guangzhou	Doubles
Silver medal – second place	2010 Guangzhou	Team of 5
Silver medal – second place	2014 Incheon	Team of 5
Southeast Asian Games
Gold medal – first place	2011 Jakarta	Doubles
Gold medal – first place	2011 Jakarta	Trios
Gold medal – first place	2011 Jakarta	Team of 5
Gold medal – first place	2015 Singapore	Team of 5
Silver medal – second place	2017 Kuala Lumpur	Singles
Silver medal – second place	2017 Kuala Lumpur	Doubles
Bronze medal – third place	2011 Jakarta	Singles
Bronze medal – third place	2015 Singapore	Masters

Adrian Ang Hsien Loong is a Malaysian ten-pin bowler. He was born on 16 July 1988 in Penang. He bowls right handed with a 15lbs ball.

== Career ==
He finished in 17th position of the combined rankings at the 2006 QubicaAMF Bowling World Cup. Amongst other successes, he won the Malaysian Open in 2010 as well as the Singapore Open in 2013. He has won major tournaments such as SEA Games, Asian Games, Asian Youth, etc.
