= Nurul Syafiqah Hashim =

Malaysian archer (born 1994)

Nurul Syafiqah Hashim (born 1 January 1994 in Pahang, Malaysia) is a Malaysian archer. She competed in the individual event at the 2012 Summer Olympics.

== Honours ==
- Terengganu
  - Recipient of the Meritorious Service Medal (PJK) (2012)
