= Timor-Leste at the SEA Games =

Timor-Leste at the Southeast Asian Games
- IOC code: TLS
- NOC: National Olympic Committee of Timor Leste
- Medals Ranked 11th: Gold 3 Silver 10 Bronze 43 Total 56

Southeast Asian Games appearances (overview)
- 2003; 2005; 2007; 2009; 2011; 2013; 2015; 2017; 2019; 2021; 2023; 2025; 2027; 2029

Timor-Leste started competing in the Southeast Asian Games in 2003 of the games in Hanoi, Vietnam. In that year, they became the youngest nation to compete, having gained independence in the year 2002; although not being an ASEAN member until 2025 and despite its geographical location closer to the Pacific archipelago than the Asian continent, making its debut at the games. Timor-Leste never hosted the Southeast Asian Games and best finished that the country attained is in 2011 Southeast Asian Games when the country won the first gold medal by Julianto Pereira and Dorceyana Borgesenth. In 2013 Southeast Asian Games they won 2 gold medals, 3 silver medals and 5 bronze medals marking their current best performance in the games.

== Southeast Asian Games ==
In 2005 Southeast Asian Games was the second Games in which the country had participated. Timor-Leste won three bronze medals, all in Arnis. Elisabeth Yanti Almeida dos Santos had never played the sport previously before competing. The other medallists were Francisca Varela and Fortunato Soares. Timor-Leste participated at the 2011 Southeast Asian Games which were held in the cities of Palembang and Jakarta, Indonesia from 11 November 2011 to 22 November 2011. Timor-Leste got its first ever gold medal since it joined the SEA Games.

=== Medals by Southeast Asian Games ===
Ranking are based on Total Overall Medal

Games	Athletes	Gold	Silver	Bronze	Total	Rank
Southeast Asian Games
(Vietnam) 2003 Hanoi	0	0	0	0	0	11
(Philippines) 2005 Manila	29	0	0	3	3	11
(Thailand) 2007 Nakhon Ratchasima	7	0	0	0	0	11
(Laos) 2009 Vientiane	61	0	0	3	3	11
(Indonesia) 2011 Jakarta / Palembang	76	1	1	6	8	10
(Myanmar) 2013 Nay Pyi Taw	49	2	3	5	10	10
2015 Singapore	66	0	1	1	2	11
(Malaysia) 2017 Kuala Lumpur	50	0	0	3	3	11
2019 Philippines	48	0	1	5	6	11
(Vietnam) 2021 Hanoi	69	0	3	2	5	11
2023 Cambodia	90	0	0	8	8	11
2025 Thailand	110	0	1	7	8	11
(Malaysia) 2027 Kuala Lumpur	Future event					
2029 Singapore	Future event					
2031 Laos	Future event					
2033 Philippines	Future event					
Total	-	3	10	43	56	11

== Medals by Summer Sport ==
Leading in that sport

Sport	Gold	Silver	Bronze	Total
Kenpō	2	3	3	8
Shorinji Kempo	1	1	4	6
Taekwondo	0	2	16	18
Boxing	0	2	13	15
Athletics	0	2	0	2
Arnis	0	0	3	3
Karate	0	0	3	3
Esports	0	0	1	1
Totals (8 entries)	3	10	43	56

== Medalist ==
No.	Medal	Name	Sport	Event	Host
1	Bronze	Francisca Valera	Arnis	Women's from individual anyo	(Philippines) 2005 Manila
2	Bronze	Fortunato Soares	Arnis	Men's full-contact sparring 71 kg	(Philippines) 2005 Manila
3	Bronze	Elisabeth Yanti Almeda Dois Reis	Arnis	Women's full-contact sparring 52 kg	(Philippines) 2005 Manila
4	Bronze	Sonia Soarescorreia	Karate	Women's 61 kg	(Laos) 2009 Vientiane
5	Bronze	Oriando Dos Santos	Boxing	Men's light fly weight - 48 Kg	(Laos) 2009 Vientiane
6	Bronze	Leonel Alves Almelda	Taekwondo	Men's 58 kg	(Laos) 2009 Vientiane
7	Gold	Julianto Pereira; Dorceyana Borges	Kenpō	Mixed kumi embu pair kyu kenshi	(Indonesia) 2011 Jakarta/Palembang
8	Silver	Domingos Savio; Fidelia Da Costa Pereira	Kenpō	Mixed kumi embu pair yudansha	(Indonesia) 2011 Jakarta/Palembang
9	Bronze	Abrao Pinto; Antonio Manuel	Kenpō	Men's kumi embu pair kyu kenshi	(Indonesia) 2011 Jakarta/Palembang
10	Bronze	Eugenio Ribeiro; Domingos Savio	Kenpō	Men's kumi embu pair yudansha	(Indonesia) 2011 Jakarta/Palembang
11	Bronze	Antonio Manuel; Lola Caldas Da Silva Da Costa; Julianto Pereira; Abrao Pinto; Dorceyana Borges; Mekita Lebre	Kenpō	Mixed dantai embu group kyu kenshi	(Indonesia) 2011 Jakarta/Palembang
12	Bronze	Mekita Lebre	Kenpō	Women's 54 kg randori	(Indonesia) 2011 Jakarta/Palembang
13	Bronze	Elio Jenoveva	Boxing	Men's welterweight 69 kg	(Indonesia) 2011 Jakarta/Palembang
14	Bronze	Luisa dos Santos	Taekwondo	Women's finweight (under 46 kg)	(Indonesia) 2011 Jakarta/Palembang
15	Gold	Brigida Nijia Maria Leta Savio Cabral; Lola Caldas da Silva da Costa; Mekita Lebre Ximenes; Silviana de Jesus Carvalho	Kenpō	Women's dantai embu group kyu kenshi	(Myanmar) 2013 Naypyidaw
16	Gold	Antonio Manuel; Julianto Pereira	Kenpō	Men's kumi embu pair kyu kenshi	(Myanmar) 2013 Naypyidaw
17	Silver	Domingos Savio; Eugenio Ribeiro	Kenpō	Men's kumi embu pair yudansha	(Myanmar) 2013 Naypyidaw
18	Silver	Adao Pinto; Antonio Manuel; Domingos Savio; Eugenio Ribeiro; Isak de Jesus Quintao Soares; Jose Bello; Julianto Pereira; Vasco Ribeiro	Kenpō	Men's dantai embu group 8 kenshi	(Myanmar) 2013 Naypyidaw
19	Silver	Joao Fenandes	Kenpō	Men's 45–50 kg randori	(Myanmar) 2013 Naypyidaw
20	Bronze	Francisco Pereira	Kenpō	Men's 60–65 kg randori	(Myanmar) 2013 Naypyidaw
21	Bronze	Brigida Nijia Maria Leta Savio Cabral; Silviana de Jesus Carvalho	Kenpō	Women's 60–65 kg kumi embu pair kyu kenshi	(Myanmar) 2013 Naypyidaw
22	Bronze	Fidelia Da Costa Pereira; Vasco Ribeiro	Kenpō	Mixed kumi embu pair yudansha	(Myanmar) 2013 Naypyidaw
23	Bronze	Elio Jenoveva Edito	Boxing	Men's 69 kg	(Myanmar) 2013 Naypyidaw
24	Bronze	Luisa dos Santos Rosa	Taekwondo	Women's gyeorugi 46–49 kg	(Myanmar) 2013 Naypyidaw
25	Silver	Luisa dos Santos Rosa	Taekwondo	Women's 46 kg	2015 Singapore
26	Bronze	Henrique Martins Borges Pereira	Boxing	Welterweight (69 kg)	2015 Singapore
27	Bronze	Sonia Martins Soares	Taekwondo	Kyorugi Women's -46 kg	(Malaysia) 2017 Kuala Lumpur
28	Bronze	Ana da Costa da Silva	Taekwondo	Kyorugi Women's -49 kg	(Malaysia) 2017 Kuala Lumpur
29	Bronze	Nilton Lemos	Taekwondo	Kyorugi Men's -58 kg	(Malaysia) 2017 Kuala Lumpur
30	Silver	Ana da Costa da Silva	Taekwondo	Women's under 46kg (fin)	2019 Philippines
31	Bronze	Imbrolia De Araujo Dos Reis Amorin	Taekwondo	Women's under 57kg (feather)	2019 Philippines
32	Bronze	Lobo Bonifacio Da Silva	Taekwondo	Men's under 56kg (fin)	2019 Philippines
33	Bronze	Rosa Luisa Dos Santos	Taekwondo	Women's under 49kg (fly)	2019 Philippines
34	Bronze	Jose Barreto Quintas da Silva	Boxing	Men's Flyweight	2019 Philippines
35	Bronze	Frederico Soares Sarmento	Boxing	Men's Light heavyweight	2019 Philippines
36	Silver	Felisberto de Deus	Athletics	Men's 5000 m	2021 Vietnam
37	Silver	Felisberto de Deus	Athletics	Men's 10000 m	2021 Vietnam
38	Silver	Delio Anzaqeci Mouzinho	Boxing	Men's Middleweight (75 kg)	2021 Vietnam
39	Bronze	Jose Quintas Da Silva Barreto	Boxing	Men's Bantamweight (57 kg)	2021 Vietnam
40	Bronze	Santina Adelaide de Dousa Fernandez	Taekwondo	Women's kyorugi Flyweight 49 kg	2021 Vietnam
41	Bronze	Delio Anzaqeci Mouzinho	Boxing	Men's Light middleweight (71 kg)	2023 Cambodia
42	Bronze	Edegar Foe Quintas da Silva	Boxing	Men's bantamweight (54 kg)	2023 Cambodia
43	Bronze	Jacob Manuel	Karate	Men's 75 kg kumite	2023 Cambodia
44	Bronze	Deonisi Fernandes Pereira Queffi	Karate	Men's 67 kg kumite	2023 Cambodia
45	Bronze	Ana da Costa da Silva	Taekwondo	Women's 46 kg	2023 Cambodia
46	Bronze	Cerilio Do Rugo Cruz Lein	Taekwondo	Men's 58 kg	2023 Cambodia
47	Bronze	Imbrolia De Araujo Dos Reis Amorin	Taekwondo	Women's 62 kg	2023 Cambodia
48	Bronze	Mousaco Galucho Claudio Joaquim	Taekwondo	Men's 87 kg	2023 Cambodia
49	Silver	Elisio Raimundo Gaio	Boxing	Men's Light welterweight (63.5 kg)	2025 Thailand
50	Bronze	Antonio Nicolau Hau da Silva	Boxing	Men's Light flyweight (48 kg)	2025 Thailand
51	Bronze	Alexandre Meliano da Costa Freitas	Boxing	Men's Welterweight (69 kg)	2025 Thailand
52	Bronze	Fransisco Moratti Gaspar da Costa Lobo	Boxing	Men's Middleweight (75 kg)	2025 Thailand
53	Bronze	Titania da Silva Quintas	Boxing	Women's Welterweight (66 kg)	2025 Thailand
54	Bronze	Merlinda da Costa Soares; Dircia Adolfina Claudia Punef; Try Xena Lindsay da Costa Dias	Taekwondo	Women's team Recognized poomsae	2025 Thailand
55	Bronze	Mota Messias Dates	Taekwondo	Women's Middleweight (87 kg)	2025 Thailand
56	Bronze	Lucia Ventura Barreto de Jesus Pereira; Expedina dos Reis Soares; Aphrilinha Teni Machado Maia Gama; Timorina Teni Maia; Fanencia Moreira Ximenes	Esports	Arena of Valor (Women's team)	2025 Thailand
