= The Space Between Us =

The Space Between Us may refer to:

- The Space Between Us (film), a 2017 American science fiction film about a teen who is born on Mars and travels to Earth
- The Space Between Us (novel), a 2006 Indian English-language novel set in Mumbai, written by Thrity Umrigar
- The Space Between Us, a 2014 English-language novel of Zoya Pirzad's book (originally titled Yek ruz mande be eid pak) in 1998 about an Armenian-Iranian community set on the Caspian Sea and Tehran.
- The Space Between Us (album), a 1998 album by Craig Armstrong
- The Space Between Us, a 2011 composition by David A. Jaffe
- "The Space Between Us", a song by +/- from Jumping the Tracks

== See also ==
- The Space Between (disambiguation)
- Between Us (disambiguation)
- "Space Between Us", a song from the Steps album Tears on the Dancefloor
