= Muhamad Ridhwan =

Singaporean boxer (born 1987)

Muhamad Ridhwan bin Ahmad (born 14 December 1987), also known as Muhamad Ridhwan, is a Singaporean retired boxer who, as of 2024 is the boxing coach of the Singaporean national team.

== Amateur career ==
Muhamad Ridhwan started boxing at the age of 16.

In the 2011 SEA Games, Ridhwan represented Singapore and won a bronze medal in the 60kg boxing event after being eliminated by Mandiangan Matius of Indonesia in the semi-finals.

In the 2013 SEA Games, Ridhwan won a bronze medal in the 60kg boxing event after being eliminated by Junel Cantancio of the Philippines in the semi-finals.

In the 2015 SEA Games, Ridhwan won a bronze medal in the 56kg boxing event after being eliminated by Tanes Ongjunta of Thailand in the semi-finals.

Ridhwan is also a co-founder of Legends Fight Sport, a Singaporean boxing gym.

== Professional career ==
In late 2015, Ridhwan went for a coaching course while on the International Olympic Committee's scholarship, but realized on the first day that he did not want to give up actually boxing. Thus, he made the decision to transit to professional boxing in February 2016.

In April 2017, Ridhwan defeated Waldo Sabu of Indonesia via knockout in the second round to win the World Boxing Association (WBA) Asia Featherweight Championship. This was his sixth knockout in winning his first seven professional boxing matches.

In May 2017, Ridhwan defeated Fadhili Majiha of Tanzania via knockout in the fourth round to capture the Universal Boxing Organisation (UBO) world super featherweight (58.97kg) title, becoming the first Singaporean to hold a world title in professional boxing.

In October 2017, Ridhwan defeated Nataneal Sebastian via unanimous decision after 12 rounds to win the International Boxing Organization (IBO) international super featherweight (58.97kg) championship. This was his ninth win of nine professional boxing bouts, and by this time he had given himself the nickname of "The Chosen Wan".

In September 2018, Ridhwan lost for the first time in professional boxing, to Paulus Ambunda, in a split decision after 12 rounds, in a match for the International Boxing Organisation super bantamweight (55kg) championship. Ridhwan was scheduled for a rematch against Ambunda in March 2019, but before that occurred, Ridhwan publicly declared in January 2019 that he had retired. Ridhwan did not actually retire at that point, as he boxed again professionally in March 2019. However, Ridhwan lost again, this time to Landy Cris Leon.

By 2024, Ridhwan had retired from boxing.

== Coaching career ==
Ridhwan began coaching the Singapore national boxing team in June 2020, a role he continued to hold as of 2025.
