= This Moment =

This Moment may refer to:

- This Moment (Steven Curtis Chapman album), 2007
- This Moment (Shakti album), 2023
- This Moment , by Monni
- "This Moment" (Marie Picasso song)
- "This Moment", by Disturbed from the album Transformers: The Album
- "This Moment", by Katy Perry from the album Prism
- "This Moment", by Lala Karmela from the album Between Us
