= Timor-Leste at the 2019 SEA Games =

Timor-Leste at the 2019 Southeast Asian Games
- IOC code: TLS
- NOC: National Olympic Committee of Timor Leste

in the Philippines
- Competitors: 48 in 10 sports
- Medals Ranked 11th: Gold 0 Silver 1 Bronze 5 Total 6

Southeast Asian Games appearances (overview)
- 2003; 2005; 2007; 2009; 2011; 2013; 2015; 2017; 2019; 2021; 2023; 2025; 2027; 2029

Timor-Leste participated at the 2019 Southeast Asian Games (SEA Games) in the Philippines that was held from 30 November to 11 December 2019. The country sent the smallest delegation to the games with 48 athletes competing in 10 sports. The host country through the Philippine Sports Commission provided the accommodation and training facilities to the East Timorese delegation who were expected to arrive seven to ten days in the Philippines prior to the games. The total delegation including athletes is 221 people.

== Preparations and reception ==
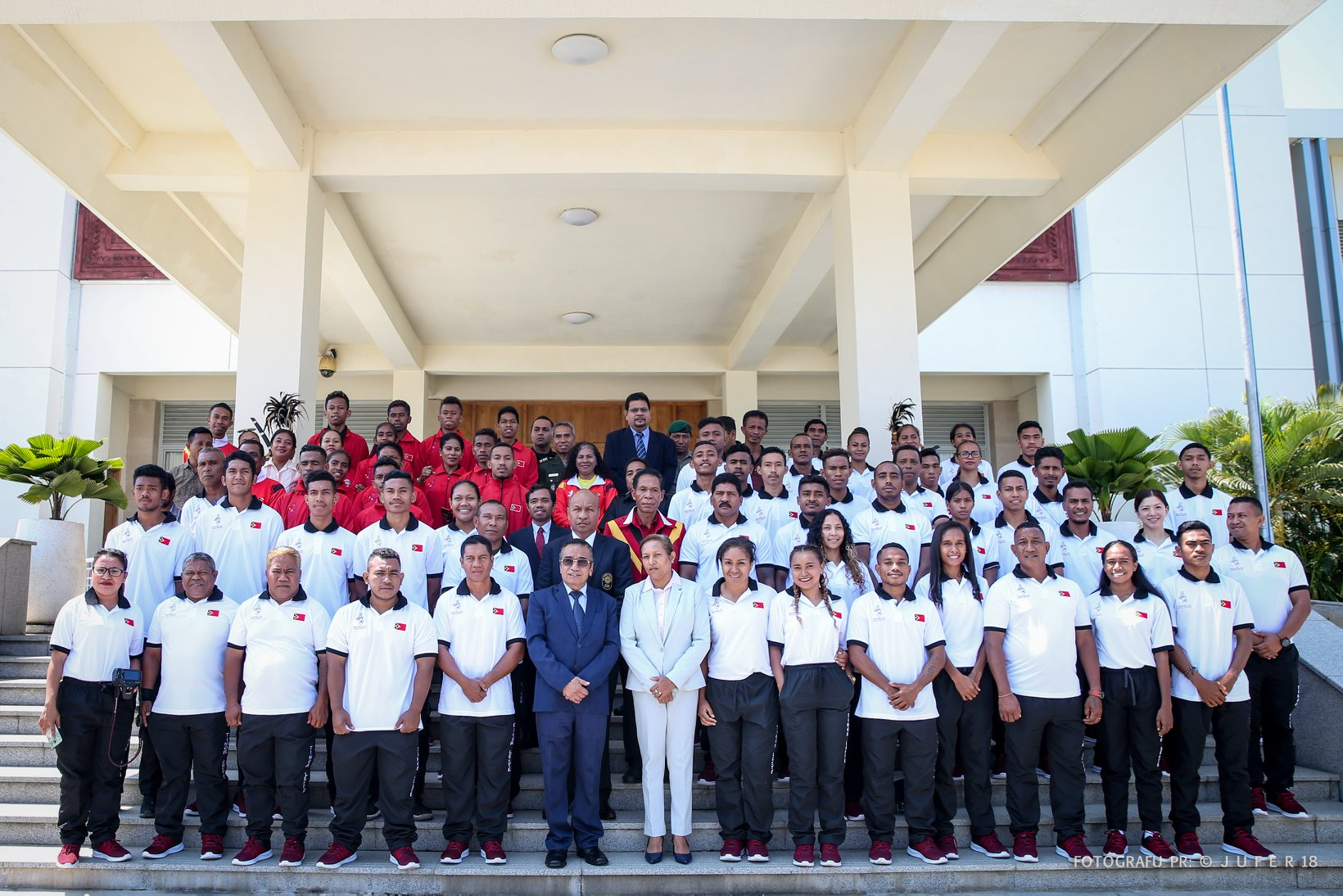
The Timor-Leste delegation meets with President Francisco Guterres.

During the second chefs de mission meeting at Pasay, Philippines that was organised by the Philippine South East Asian Games Organizing Committee (PHISGOC) in July 2019, all countries, which are included in the 2019 Southeast Asian Games, agreed to the hosting of the SEA Games at the Philippines. In the meeting, Timor Leste (East Timor) was represented by Vicente C. Da Silva. They proceeded to Pampanga and the New Clark City in Tarlac to examine the places where the games would be held.

Timor-Leste requested help from the Philippine Sports Commission (PSC) for their final preparations at the SEA Games. According to PHISGOC Executive Director Tom Carrasco, their request were approved by PSC Chairman William "Butch" Ramirez. The PSC would assist them on their accommodations and would give them access to facilities without charge.

As expected, Timor-Leste delegation specifically the football team started to arrive as early as 23 November 2019. Their arrival met with logistical problems. The East Timorese football team waited around three hours for their bus to arrive and they were dropped off in a wrong hotel. The day after the delegation's arrival, the Speaker of the House of Representatives and PHISGOC Chairman Alan Peter Cayetano personally apologised to the athletes and coaches of the participating countries including East Timor, which was affected by inconveniences that they experienced upon their arrival in the Philippines.

On December 3, 2019, Timor-Leste was still last place at the medal tally without winning any medals. Filipino netizens noticed this and invited the public to support and cheer for Timor-Leste echoing the SEA Games 2019 tagline, which is "We win as one!" East Timorese delegates were very thankful for their support. An official of the Timor-Leste's federation of taekwando, Alexandrino da Costa, said that “It’s not about just winning but how we can make friendly relations between our countries through sports.”

== Participation ==
On December 8, 2019, East Timorese athlete Imbrolia De Araujo Dos Reis Amorin won bronze medal when she landed third place in the 57 kg women's division of taekwondo. On the same day, two East Timorese boxers also won bronze namely Jose Barreto Quintas Da Silva in the flyweight division and Frederico Soares Sarmento in the light heavyweight division.

== Medal summary ==
=== Medal by sport ===
Medals by sport
Sport	1st place, gold medalist(s)	2nd place, silver medalist(s)	3rd place, bronze medalist(s)	Total
Aquatic Swimming	0	0	0	0
Archery	0	0	0	0
Arnis	0	0	0	0
Athletics	0	0	0	0
Basketball	0	0	0	0
Billiards and snooker	0	0	0	0
Bowling	0	0	0	0
Boxing	0	0	2	2
Chess	0	0	0	0
Cycling	0	0	0	0
Dancesport	0	0	0	0
Duathlon	0	0	0	0
Esports	0	0	0	0
Figure skating	0	0	0	0
Fencing	0	0	0	0
Floorball	0	0	0	0
Football	0	0	0	0
Golf	0	0	0	0
Gymnastics	0	0	0	0
Beach Handball	0	0	0	0
Ice hockey	0	0	0	0
Indoor Hockey	0	0	0	0
Judo	0	0	0	0
Ju-jitsu	0	0	0	0
Karate	0	0	0	0
Lawn Bowls	0	0	0	0
Muaythai	0	0	0	0
Modern pentathlon	0	0	0	0
Netball	0	0	0	0
Obstacle racing	0	0	0	0
Pencak Silat	0	0	0	0
Polo	0	0	0	0
Rowing	0	0	0	0
Rugby sevens	0	0	0	0
Sailing	0	0	0	0
Sambo	0	0	0	0
Sepak Takraw	0	0	0	0
Shooting	0	0	0	0
Skateboarding	0	0	0	0
Soft tennis	0	0	0	0
Softball	0	0	0	0
Squash	0	0	0	0
Surfing	0	0	0	0
Table tennis	0	0	0	0
Taekwondo	0	1	3	4
Tennis	0	0	0	0
Triathlon	0	0	0	0
Volleyball	0	0	0	0
Wakeboarding	0	0	0	0
Weightlifting	0	0	0	0
Wrestling	0	0	0	0
Wushu	0	0	0	0
Total	0	1	5	6

=== Medal by date ===
Medals by date
Day	Date	1st place, gold medalist(s)	2nd place, silver medalist(s)	3rd place, bronze medalist(s)	Total
1	1 December	0	0	0	0
2	2 December	0	0	0	0
3	3 December	0	0	0	0
4	4 December	0	0	0	0
5	5 December	0	0	0	0
6	6 December	0	0	0	0
7	7 December	0	0	0	0
8	8 December	0	0	1	1
9	9 December	0	1	4	5
10	10 December	0	0	0	0
11	11 December	0	0	0	0
Total		0	1	5	6

=== Medalists ===
Source: SEA Games 2019 website.

Medal	Name	Sport	Event	Date
Silver	Ana Da Costa Da Silva	Taekwondo	Women's under 46kg (fin)	9 December
Bronze	Imbrolia De Araujo Dos Reis Amorin	Taekwondo	Women's under 57kg (feather)	8 December
Bronze	Jose Barreto Quintas da Silva	Boxing	Men's Flyweight	9 December
Bronze	Frederico Soares Sarmento	Boxing	Men's Light heavyweight	9 December
Bronze	Lobo Bonifacio Da Silva	Taekwondo	Men's under 56kg (fin)	9 December
Bronze	Rosa Luisa Dos Santos	Taekwondo	Women's under 49kg (fly)	9 December

== See also ==
Timor-Leste at the 2021 Southeast Asian Games
