= Thrity Umrigar =

Indian and Parsi author

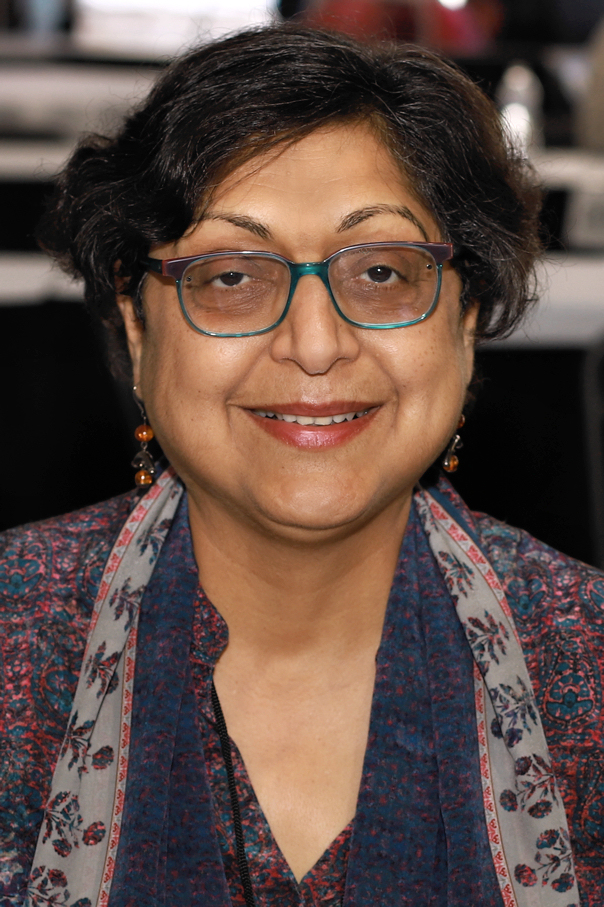
- Umrigar at the 2022 Texas Book Festival.
- Born: Thrity Umrigar; 1961; Mumbai, India
- Education: B.S. Bombay University, M.A. Ohio State University, Ph.D. Kent State University
- Occupations: Journalist; novelist; critic; teacher
- Website: umrigar.com

Thrity Umrigar is an Indian-American journalist, critic, and novelist.

== Early life ==
Umrigar was born in Mumbai, India to a Parsi family, and relocated to the United States at the age of 21. There she completed her graduate education.

Umrigar received a Bachelor of Science from Bombay University, a M.A. in journalism from Ohio State University, and a Ph.D. in English from Kent State University.

== Career ==
Umrigar started her career in journalism as a reporter for the Lorain Journal in 1985, moving to the Akron Beacon Journal in 1987, where she worked while simultaneously working on her doctorate at Kent State. After a stint as a Nieman Fellow for Journalism at Harvard University, where she worked on completing her first novel, Bombay Time, she left the Beacon Journal in 2002 for a visiting professorship at Case Western Reserve University.

She has written for The Washington Post, the Cleveland Plain Dealer, and The Huffington Post. She regularly writes for The Boston Globe's book pages. She is the Armitage Professor of English at Case Western Reserve University in Cleveland. She is also active on the national lecture circuit.

== Works ==
- Bombay Time (2001)
- First Darling of the Morning: Selected Memories of an Indian Childhood (2004)
- The Space Between Us (2006)
- If Today Be Sweet (2007)
- The Weight of Heaven (2009)
- The World We Found (2012)
- The Story Hour (2014)
- Everybody's Son (2017)
- When I Carried You in My Belly (2017)
- The Secrets Between Us (2018)
- Binny's Diwali (2020)
- Sugar in Milk (2020)
- Honor (2022)
- The Museum of Failures (2023)

== Recognition ==
- 2000 - Nieman Fellowship for Journalism at Harvard University
- 2006 - Finalist for the PEN Open Book Award
- 2009 - Cleveland Arts Prize in Literature
- 2013 - Lambda Literary Award in the Lesbian General Fiction category for her novel, The World We Found

== See also ==
- List of Indian writers
