= Timor-Leste at the 2009 SEA Games =

Timor-Leste at the 2009 Southeast Asian Games
- IOC code: TLS
- NOC: National Olympic Committee of East Timor

in Vientiane
- Flag bearer: Ana Maria Paula Pinto (Karatedo)
- Medals Ranked 11th: Gold 0 Silver 0 Bronze 3 Total 3

Southeast Asian Games appearances (overview)
- 2003; 2005; 2007; 2009; 2011; 2013; 2015; 2017; 2019; 2021; 2023; 2025; 2027; 2029

East Timor participated in the 2009 Southeast Asian Games in the city of Vientiane, Laos from 9 December 2009 to 18 December 2009.

== Expectations ==
Before the games, East Timor was preparing its national athletes locally. Its Olympic Committee planned that East Timor should join more sports this time compared to those of the previous SEAG editions. Also, East Timor was expecting to boost its medal tally and finally gain a silver and a gold medal in the biennial event.

== Medal tally ==
Sport	Gold	Silver	Bronze	Total
Boxing	0	0	1	1
Karate	0	0	1	1
Taekwondo	0	0	1	1
Totals (3 entries)	0	0	3	3

== Medalists ==
Medal	Name	Sport	Event
Bronze	Sonia Soarescorreia	Karate	Women's 61 kg
Bronze	Oriando Dos Santos	Boxing	Men's light fly weight - 48 Kg
Bronze	Leonel Alves Almelda	Taekwondo	Men's 58 kg

== By sport ==
=== Boxing ===
East Timor participated in the sport of boxing at the 2009 Southeast Asian Games. The country sent two athletes namely: Oriando dos Santos and Manuel Batisia. Oriando dos Santos contested in the men's light flyweight division and gained a bronze medal when he lost to Harry Tanamor of Philippines. The latter joined the men's featherweight division but lost early to Charly Suarez of Philippines thus losing hope of gaining a medal.

Athlete	Event	Quarterfinals	Semifinals	Final	Rank
Athlete	Event	Opposition Result	Opposition Result	Opposition Result	Rank
Oriando Dos Santos	Light flyweight	bye	(Philippines) Harry Tanamor (PHI) lose RSCOS	Did not advance	Bronze
Otnel Negrito Manuel Batisia	Featherweight	(Philippines) Charly Suarez (PHI) lose KO	Did not advance		

=== Karate ===
East Timor also participated in the sport of karatedo at the 2009 Southeast Asian Games. It participated in the women's individual and team kumite division. Furthermore, it became a source of medal for East Timor. The karateka, Sonia Soarescorreia, won a bronze medal in the women's kumite division - 61 kg and below.

Athlete	Event	Round 1 of 16	Quarterfinals	Semifinals	Repechage Quarterfinals	Final	Rank
Athlete	Event	Opposition Result	Opposition Result	Opposition Result	Opposition Result	Opposition Result	Rank
Ana Maria Paula Pinto	Women's kumite 50 kg and below	bye	(Brunei) Masdiana Tengah (BRU) lose	Did not advance			
Elisa de Fatina	Women's kumite 55 kg and below	bye		(Vietnam) Nguyen Thi Hai Yen (VIE) lose	(Thailand) Yanisa Torrattanawathana (THA) lose	Did not advance	
Sonia Soarescorreia	Women's kumite 61 kg and below	bye		(Vietnam) Bui Thi Trieu (VIE) lose	bye	Did not advance	Bronze
Elisa de Fatina; Ana Maria Paula Pinto; Sonia Soarescorreia	Women's team kumite	Philippines (PHI) lose	Did not advance				

=== Taekwondo ===
East Timor also participated in the sport of taekwondo at the 2009 Southeast Asian Games. It sent two athletes to join the sport. Those were: Leonel Alves Almeida and Mateus João Felgueiras. Almeida competed in the men's flyweight division while Felgueiras competed in the men's finweight division. In addition, the sport also became a source of medal of East Timor at the 2009 Southeast Asian Games. Almeida won a bronze medal.

Athlete	Event	Quarterfinals	Semifinals	Final	Rank
Athlete	Event	Opposition Result	Opposition Result	Opposition Result	Rank
Leonel Alves Almeida	Flyweight	bye	(Cambodia) Chhoy Bouthorn (CAM) lose 4-2	Did not advance	Bronze
Mateus João Felgueiras	Finweight	(Malaysia) Harith Feizal bin Mat Nor (MAS) lose 8-3	Did not advance		
