= Timor-Leste at the 2013 SEA Games =

Timor-Leste at the 2013 Southeast Asian Games
- IOC code: TLS
- NOC: National Olympic Committee of East Timor

in Naypyidaw
- Competitors: 49 in 6 sports
- Medals Ranked 10th: Gold 2 Silver 3 Bronze 5 Total 10

Southeast Asian Games appearances (overview)
- 2003; 2005; 2007; 2009; 2011; 2013; 2015; 2017; 2019; 2021; 2023; 2025; 2027; 2029

East Timor competed at the 2013 Southeast Asian Games. The 27th Southeast Asian Games took place in Naypyidaw, the capital of Myanmar, as well as in two other main cities, Yangon and Mandalay.

== Competitors ==
Sport	Men	Women	Total
Athletics	1	1	2
Boxing	2	0	2
Cycling	1	1	2
Football	23	0	23
Kenpō	12	6	18
Taekwondo	0	2	2
Total	39	10	49

== Medal summary ==
=== Medal by sport ===
Medals by sport
Sport	1st place, gold medalist(s)	2nd place, silver medalist(s)	3rd place, bronze medalist(s)	Total
Kenpō	2	3	3	8
Taekwondo	0	0	1	1
Boxing	0	0	1	1
Total	2	3	5	10

=== Medalists ===
Medal	Name	Sport	Event
Gold	Brigida Nijia Maria Leta Savio Cabral; Lola Caldas da Silva da Costa; Mekita Lebre Ximenes; Silviana de Jesus Carvalho	Kenpō	Women's dantai embu group kyu kenshi
Gold	Antonio Manuel; Julianto Pereira	Kenpō	Men's kumi embu pair kyu kenshi
Silver	Domingos Savio; Eugenio Ribeiro	Kenpō	Men's kumi embu pair yudansha
Silver	Adao Pinto; Antonio Manuel; Domingos Savio; Eugenio Ribeiro; Isak de Jesus Quintao Soares; Jose Bello; Julianto Pereira; Vasco Ribeiro	Kenpō	Men's dantai embu group 8 kenshi
Silver	Joao Fenandes	Kenpō	Men's 45–50 kg randori
Bronze	Francisco Pereira	Kenpō	Men's 60–65 kg randori
Bronze	Brigida Nijia Maria Leta Savio Cabral; Silviana de Jesus Carvalho	Kenpō	Women's 60–65 kg kumi embu pair kyu kenshi
Bronze	Fidelia Da Costa Pereira; Vasco Ribeiro	Kenpō	Mixed kumi embu pair yudansha
Bronze	Elio Jenoveva Edito	Boxing	Men's 69 kg
Bronze	Luisa Dos Santos Rosa	Taekwondo	Women's gyeorugi 46–49 kg
