= The Space Between (disambiguation) =

"The Space Between" is a 2001 song by the Dave Matthews Band.

The Space Between may also refer to:

== Films ==
- The Space Between (2010 film), a feature film written and directed by Travis Fine
- The Space Between (2011 film), a Scottish film
- The Space Between (2016 Australian film), an Australian film directed by Ruth Borgobello
- The Space Between (2016 Canadian film), a Canadian film directed by Amy Jo Johnson
- The Space Between (2021 film), an American film

== Music ==
- The Space Between (Majid Jordan album), 2017
- The Space Between (Illy album), 2021
- "The Space Between", a 1982 song by Roxy Music on the album Avalon (Roxy Music album)

== Literature ==
- Star Trek: The Next Generation – The Space Between, a Star Trek six-issue comic book limited series published by IDW Publishing (January–June 2007)
- The Space Between, a 2020 self-help book by Shameless journalists Michelle Andrews and Zara McDonald
- The Space Between, a 2013 novella in the Outlander series by Diana Gabaldon

== See also ==
- Space Between (disambiguation)
- The Space Between Us (disambiguation)
