= Timor-Leste at the 2017 SEA Games =

Timor-Leste at the 2017 Southeast Asian Games
- IOC code: TLS
- NOC: National Olympic Committee of Timor Leste

in Malaysia
- Competitors: 50 in 9 sports
- Flag bearer: Liliana da Silva
- Medals Ranked 11th: Gold 0 Silver 0 Bronze 3 Total 3

Southeast Asian Games appearances (overview)
- 2003; 2005; 2007; 2009; 2011; 2013; 2015; 2017; 2019; 2021; 2023; 2025; 2027; 2029

Timor-Leste were in the 2017 Southeast Asian Games in Kuala Lumpur, Malaysia from 19 to 30 August 2017.

== Competitors ==
Sport	Men	Women	Total
Aquatic Swimming	0	1	1
Athletics	2	2	4
Boxing	4	0	4
Football	20	0	20
Karate	2	2	4
Pencak silat	2	0	2
Taekwondo	2	2	4
Volleyball	9	0	9
Weightlifting	2	0	2
Total	43	7	50

== Medal summary ==
=== Medal by sport ===
Medals by sport
Sport	1st place, gold medalist(s)	2nd place, silver medalist(s)	3rd place, bronze medalist(s)	Total
Taekwondo	0	0	3	3
Total	0	0	3	3

=== Medal by date ===
Medals by date
Day	Date	1st place, gold medalist(s)	2nd place, silver medalist(s)	3rd place, bronze medalist(s)	Total
–3	16 August	0	0	0	0
–2	17 August	0	0	0	0
–1	18 August	0	0	0	0
0	19 August	0	0	0	0
1	20 August	0	0	0	0
2	21 August	0	0	0	0
3	22 August	0	0	0	0
4	23 August	0	0	0	0
5	24 August	0	0	0	0
6	25 August	0	0	0	0
7	26 August	0	0	0	0
8	27 August	0	0	0	0
9	28 August	0	0	1	1
10	29 August	0	0	2	2
11	30 August	0	0	0	
Total		0	0	3	3

=== Medalists ===
Medal	Name	Sport	Event	Date
Bronze	Sonia Martins Soares	Taekwondo	Kyorugi Women's -46 kg	28 August 2017
Bronze	Ana Da Costa	Taekwondo	Kyorugi Women's -49 kg	29 August 2017
Bronze	Nilton Lemos	Taekwondo	Kyorugi Men's -58 kg	29 August 2017

== Football ==
=== Men's ===
Pos	Team	Pld	W	D	L	GF	GA	GD	Pts	Qualification
1	Thailand	5	4	1	0	10	1	+9	13	Semi-finals
2	Indonesia	5	3	2	0	7	1	+6	11	Semi-finals
3	Vietnam	5	3	1	1	12	4	+8	10	
4	Philippines	5	2	0	3	4	10	−6	6	
5	Timor-Leste	5	1	0	4	2	8	−6	3	
6	Cambodia	5	0	0	5	1	12	−11	0	

Updated to match(es) played on 24 August 2017. Source: KL2017 Official Website
Rules for classification: 1) Points; 2) Goal difference; 3) Goals scored
15 August 2017
16:00

Vietnam	4–0	Timor-Leste
Đoàn Văn Hậu 8', 41'; Hà Đức Chinh 20'; Nguyễn Công Phượng 72'	Report

Selayang Municipal Council Stadium, Selayang
Referee: Omar Al-Yaquobi (Oman)
17 August 2017
20:45

Thailand	1–0	Timor-Leste
Worachit 59'	Report

Selayang Municipal Council Stadium, Selayang
Referee: Lakmal Weerakkody (Sri Lanka)
20 August 2017
16:00

Timor-Leste	0–1	Indonesia
	Report	Marinus 22'

Selayang Municipal Council Stadium, Selayang
Referee: Nagor Amir Noor Mohamed (Malaysia)
22 August 2017
20:45

Cambodia	0–1	Timor-Leste
	Report	da Silva 57'

UM Arena Stadium, Kuala Lumpur
Referee: Mohamed Javiz (Maldives)
24 August 2017
16:00

Timor-Leste	1–2	Philippines
Rocha 45' (o.g.)	Report	Gayoso 10', 90+4'

UM Arena Stadium, Kuala Lumpur

== Volleyball ==
=== Men's ===
Team
Results

Team	Preliminary round		Semifinal	Final	Rank
Team	Group B	Rank	Semifinal	Final	Rank
Timor-Leste	Indonesia; L 0 – 3	4	Did not advance		
Timor-Leste	Vietnam; L 0 – 3	4	Did not advance		
Timor-Leste	Philippines; L 0 – 3	4	Did not advance		
