= Space Between =

Space Between may refer to:

- Space Between (album), a 2019 album from Sammy Hagar's band The Circle
- "Space Between", a song from Sia's 2016 album This Is Acting
- "The Space Between", a song from Dave Matthews Band's 2001 album Everyday
- The Space Between (disambiguation)
