= Timor-Leste at the 2005 SEA Games =

Timor-Leste at the 2005 Southeast Asian Games
- IOC code: TLS
- NOC: National Olympic Committee of Timor Leste

in the Manila
- Competitors: 33
- Flag bearer: Gueda Amaral
- Medals Ranked 11th: Gold 0 Silver 0 Bronze 3 Total 3

Southeast Asian Games appearances (overview)
- 2003; 2005; 2007; 2009; 2011; 2013; 2015; 2017; 2019; 2021; 2023; 2025; 2027; 2029

Timor-Leste participated in the 2005 Southeast Asian Games held in multiple venues in the Philippines from November 27, 2005 to December 5, 2005. The chief of mission to the games was Antonio Ximenes.

== Participation details ==
This was the second Southeast Asian Games in which the country had participated. East Timor won three bronze medals, all in Arnis. Elisabeth Yanti Almeida dos Santos had never played the sport previously before competing. The other medallists were Francisca Varela and Fortunato Soares.

== Medalists ==
Medal	Name	Sport	Event
Bronze	Fortunato Soares	Arnis	Men's full-contact sparring (-71 kg)
Bronze	Elisabeth Yanti Almeida dos Santos	Arnis	Women's full-contact sparring (-52 kg)
Bronze	Francisca Varela	Arnis	Women's individual anyo
