= Irish Magno =

Filipino amateur boxer (born 1991)

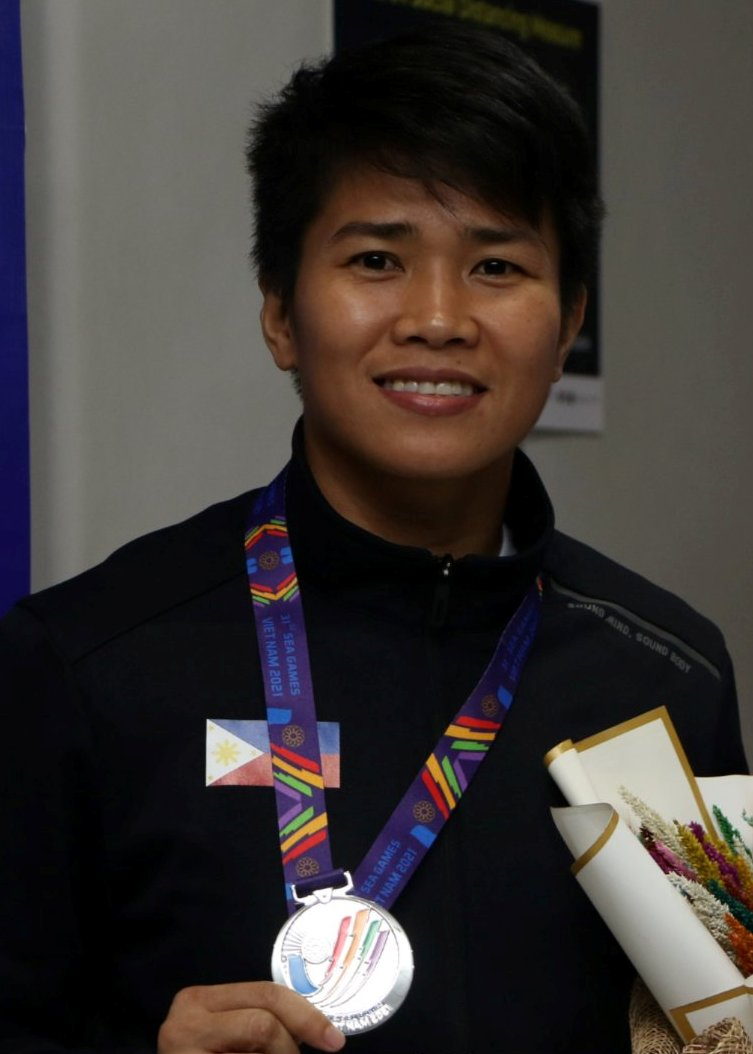
- Magno in 2022

Personal information
- Nationality: Filipino
- Born: July 27, 1991 (age 34) Janiuay, Iloilo, Philippines
- Height: 157 cm (5 ft 2 in)

Boxing career
- Weight class: Bantamweight, Flyweight
- Stance: Orthodox
Medal record
Women's amateur boxing
Representing the Philippines
Southeast Asian Games
Silver medal – second place	2023 Cambodia	Bantamweight
Silver medal – second place	2021 Vietnam	Flyweight
Silver medal – second place	2019 Philippines	Flyweight
Silver medal – second place	2015 Singapore	Flyweight
Bronze medal – third place	2013 Naypyidaw	Bantamweight

Irish Ardiente Magno (born July 27, 1991) is a Filipino amateur boxer who has represented the Philippines in international amateur competitions including the Asian Games and the World Championships. She has also qualified for the 2020 Summer Olympics, becoming the first female Filipino boxer to qualify for the Games. She did not win for her country but managed to get to the second round for her weight category.

== Education ==
In 2020, Magno was pursuing a bachelor's degree in criminology at the University of Baguio.

== Career ==
Magno's boxing career started when she was 16 years old. While watching amateur boxers train at the town plaza of her hometown of Janiuay, Iloilo, she was approached by a coach. The coach encouraged her to try out boxing due to her height. Prior to that time, Magno had an impression that boxing is exclusively for men. She competed at the National Open, Youth and Women's Amateur Boxing Championship which was hosted in Iloilo, learning that she would be competing in the national championship only three days prior. She was eliminated in the first round, with her opponent being Southeast Asian Games gold medalist Annie Albania.

She joined the Philippine national boxing team and moved to Manila upon learning that boxing could support her education due to her family's financial situation, with her mother being a housewife and her father a carpenter. Magno also had an older sister who was pursuing her collegiate studies. The opportunity to support her family financially is what kept Magno from quitting boxing.

Magno's first gold medal in an international competition was won at the 2012 Taipei Open in Taiwan. She has also regularly participated in the Southeast Asian Games, representing the Philippines in the 2013, 2015, and 2019 editions. Her silver medal in the women's flyweight division was in the 2019 games was her best finish in the Southeast Asian Games. She lost to Vietnam's Nguyễn Thị Tâm in that event's final.

In the 2018 Asian Games in Jakarta–Palembang, she competed in the bantamweight division.

She qualified for the 2020 Summer Olympics in March 2020 via the Asia/Oceania qualifiers held in Jordan. Magno became the first-ever female boxer representing the Philippines to qualify for the Olympics. However the Olympics itself was postponed to next year due to the COVID-19 pandemic and had to train virtually with her national coaches from her hometown in Janiuay, Iloilo where she also decided to set up a boxing clinic.
