= 2011 SEA Games =

Multi-sport event in Indonesia

XXVI Southeast Asian Games
- Host city: Jakarta and Palembang, Indonesia
- Motto: United and Rising (Indonesian: Bersatu dan Bangkit)
- Nations: 11
- Athletes: 5,965
- Events: 545 in 44 sports
- Opening: 11 November 2011
- Closing: 22 November 2011
- Opened by: Susilo Bambang Yudhoyono; President of Indonesia
- Athlete's Oath: Dedeh Erawati
- Judge's Oath: Eko Sunarto
- Torch lighter: Susi Susanti
- Ceremony venue: Gelora Sriwijaya Stadium
- Website: 2011 Southeast Asian Games

The 2011 Southeast Asian Games, (Indonesian: Pesta Olahraga Asia Tenggara 2011) officially known as the 26th Southeast Asian Games, or the 26th SEA Games, and commonly known as Jakarta-Palembang 2011, were a Southeast Asian multi-sport event held from 11 to 22 November 2011 in Jakarta and Palembang, Indonesia. It was Indonesia's fourth time to host the Southeast Asian Games, and its first since 1997. Previously, Indonesia also hosted in 1979 and 1987. The capital city of Jakarta hosted all three of the previous Games prior to this. Palembang became the third SEA Games non-capital host city, after Chiang Mai (1995) and Nakhon Ratchasima (2007), both in Thailand. Around 5,965 athletes from 11 participating nations participated at the games which featured 545 events in 44 sports.

The Games were held from 11 to 22 November 2011, although several events had commenced from 3 November 2011. The Games were opened by Susilo Bambang Yudhoyono, the President of Indonesia at the Gelora Sriwijaya Stadium in Palembang.

The final medal tally was led by host Indonesia, followed by Thailand and Vietnam, while Timor-Leste won its first ever Southeast Asian Games gold medal. Several Games and national records were broken during the games. Although there were several controversies (like the corruption of the construction of the athlete's village), the Games were deemed generally successful with its promotion for conservative effort on endangered fauna species namely the komodo dragon through the mascot and with the rising standard of competition amongst the Southeast Asian nations.

== Organisation ==
=== Host city ===
Co-hosts of 2011 Southeast Asian Games

Palembang, the capital city of South Sumatra was the main host of the games, while the nation's capital Jakarta was the co-host. As the main host, Palembang only held 22 of 42 sports, the rest was held by the co-host city. Palembang also hosted the opening and closing ceremonies.

Initially, the government had named four provinces as candidates to host the SEA Games 2011, namely Jakarta, West Java, Central Java, and South Sumatra. However this idea has been discarded and hosting rights was granted to only two provinces, Jakarta and South Sumatra. President Susilo Bambang Yudhoyono had suggested that this could simplify hosting and organization while reducing costs.

=== Development and preparation ===
INASOC was the organising body for the games. The president of INASOC was Rita Subowo, who is also the then-president of the Indonesia Olympic Committee, with Rahmat Gobel, an entrepreneur and the president of Panasonic Gobel Indonesia, its director-general. The Indonesian government budget of 2010 gave a total of 350 billion rupiahs (≈US$38.7 million) for the games, while the budget of 2011 gave a total of 2.1 trillion rupiahs (≈US$230 million). According to the Indonesian Minister of Youth and Sports Andi Mallarangeng, the government of Indonesia added 1 trillion rupiahs (± US$110 million) from the government budget for the games, including 600 billion from the budget for the education sector and funds from sponsorship. The government of South Sumatra declared its commitment to incorporate eco-policies with the games. All venues during the games are smoke-free. Palembang, as the first city outside Jakarta to host the SEA Games, faced some environmental problems due to development for the games.

=== Venues ===
Venues in Palembang

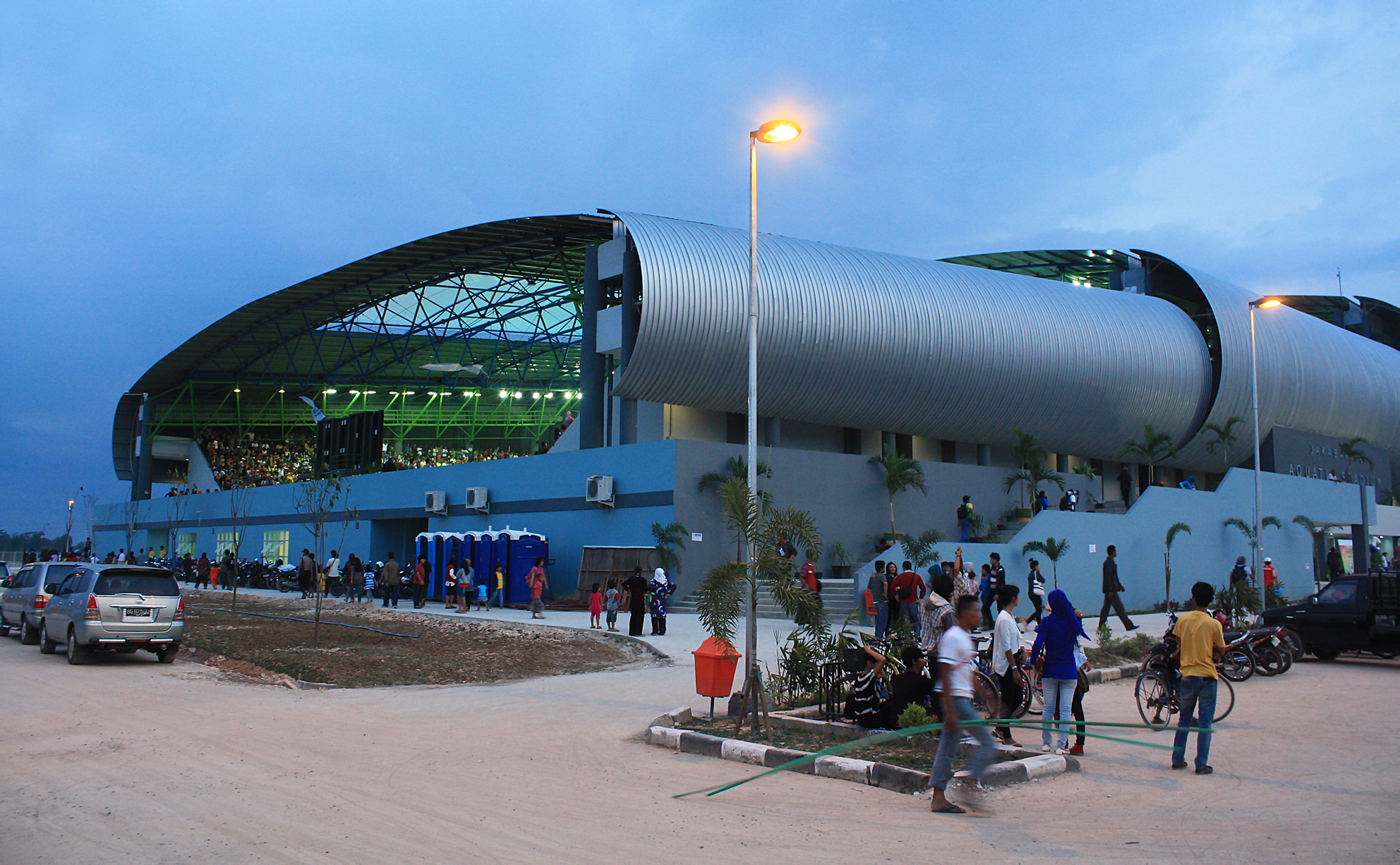
Jakabaring Aquatic Center, the venue of aquatic sports

Venues	Sports
Jakabaring Sport City
Gelora Sriwijaya Stadium	Ceremonies (opening/closing)
Dempo Hall	Gymnastics (aerobic)
Dempo Sports Complex	Weightlifting
Gedung Serbaguna Jakabaring	Wrestling
Jakabaring Athletic Stadium	Athletics
Jakabaring Aquatic Stadium	Aquatics (Swimming, diving and synchronised swimming)
Jakabaring Baseball Field	Baseball
Jakabaring Pétanque Arena	Petanque
Jakabaring Lake	Finswimming
Jakabaring Roller Sports Arena	Roller skating
Jakabaring Softball Field	Softball
Jakabaring Shooting Range	Shooting
Bukit Asam Tennis Stadium	Tennis and soft tennis
Jakabaring Beach Volleyball Arena	Beach volleyball
Jakabaring Sport Climbing Arena	Competition climbing, water skiing
Jakabaring Billiard Arena	Cue sports
Ranau Gymnastic Hall	Gymnastics (artistic and rhythmic)
SPC Jakabaring	Sepak takraw
Other venues in Palembang
Jayakarta Hotel	Chess
Lumban Tirta Arena	Aquatics (water polo)
Swarna Dwipa Hotel	Bridge
University of Sriwijaya (Fieldhouse and Sriwijaya Sports Hall)	Boxing, volleyball (indoor)

Venues in Jakarta

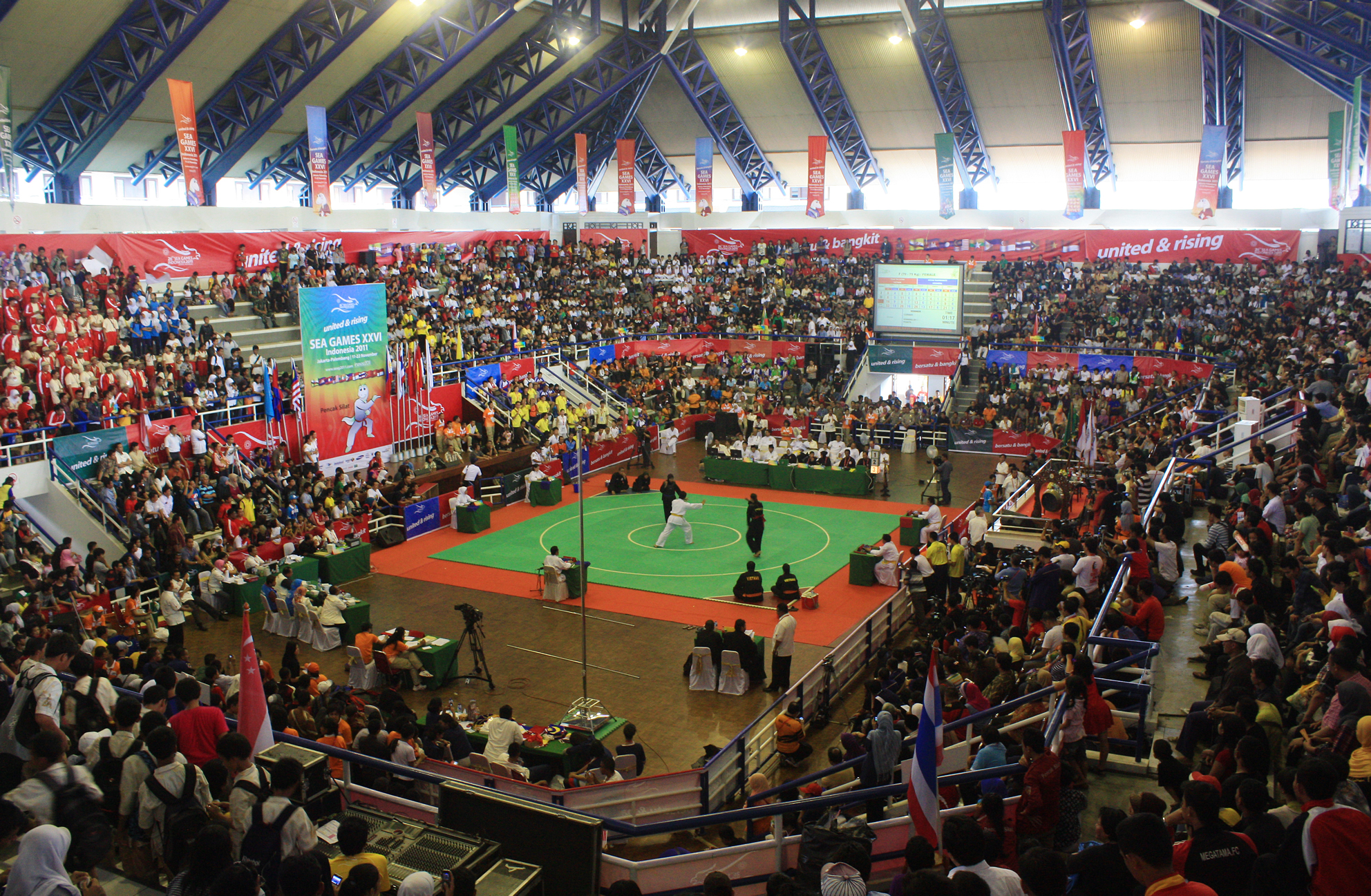
The Padepokan Pencak Silat Indonesia Arena was the venue for pencak silat at the games

Venues	Sports
Gelora Bung Karno Sports Complex
Gelora Bung Karno Stadium	Football
Istora Gelora Bung Karno	Badminton
Gelora Bung Karno ABC Football Field	Archery
Gelora Bung Karno Tennis Indoor Stadium	Karate, wushu
Other venues in Jakarta
Ancol Dreamland	Cycling (BMX), sailing
Lebak Bulus Stadium	Football
Kelapa Gading Judo Center	Judo
Kelapa Gading Sports Mall	Basketball
Padepokan Pencak Silat	Pencak silat
POPKI Sports Hall	Futsal, taekwondo
Putri Island	Aquatics (Open-water swimming)
Soemantri Brodjonegoro Stadium	Table tennis
Bowling Jaya Ancol	Bowling
Gelanggang Remaja Tanjung Priok	Vovinam
Rawamangun Velodrome	Cycling (track)
Ciracas Sport Hall	Kenpo

Venues in West Java (Including Greater Jakarta)

Venues	Sports
Arthayasa Stables and Country Club	Equestrian
Gunung Mas	Paragliding
Gunung Pancar	Cycling (MTB)
Jagorawi Country Club	Golf, lawn bowls
Lake Cipule	Canoeing/kayaking, rowing, traditional boat race
Subang Road	Cycling (road race)
University of Indonesia	Fencing

Athletes' village Located near Palembang, Jakabaring was the athletes' village (wisma atlet) during the games. It covered an area of more than 45,000 square metres. It is located in front of Jakabaring Stadium (Gelora Sriwijaya).

=== Public transport ===
To prepare for athletes, officials and visitors during the games, several significant changes are being done in both host cities. Palembang doubled the size of its Sultan Mahmud Badaruddin II Airport. Nowadays, the airport is served by only seven airlines and served only three other ASEAN countries: Singapore, Malaysia and Thailand. INASOC improved the number of flights, especially connecting flights from Jakarta and Singapore to Palembang and also eased charter flights from other SEA Games participating countries. The South Sumatran Office of Transportation, Communication and Information provided a total of 40 buses, 100 midibuses, 300 minibuses and 100 motorcycles for the athletes, officials and journalists. Besides, a bus rapid transit system, Trans Musi, served Palembang and surrounding regencies of Ogan Ilir and Banyuasin.

On 31 December 2010, Jakarta's bus rapid transit system, TransJakarta, opened its newest two corridors, Corridor 9 and 10, to serve the games.

Concerning traffic jams in Jakarta, police blocked trucks from the inner city toll road between 5:00 am and 10:00 pm. Only shuttle buses with certain stickers for the games were allowed to enter the games' two main venues.

=== Countdown ===
The official countdown to the games' opening ceremony started since 11 November 2010, marking a year before the games. The countdown clock is located nearby the Ampera Bridge, the landmark of Palembang.

Three hundred days before the opening ceremony, a special event showing Indonesian art performances and featuring a number of Indonesian famous celebrity was held at Teater Tanah Airku, Taman Mini Indonesia Indah, Jakarta. During the event, the official logo of the games was launched publicly. On 10 November 2010 in Palembang, Indonesian Minister of Sport and Youth begin a year countdown to SEA Games opening.

=== Torch relay ===
A torch relay was held; the flame for SEA Games was taken from Desa Mrapen, Purwodadi in the province of Central Java. The flame from Merapen was also used for 2008 Asian Beach Games and 1997 Southeast Asian Games torch relays. The relay started in Purwodadi and arrived in Palembang on 11 November 2011. It traveled through several Indonesian provinces before it followed the route across 15 South Sumatran regencies. The torch was passed from 6 to 11 November through Borobudur, Yogyakarta, Semarang, Komodo Island and Kupang, Jayapura, Makassar, Balikpapan and Samarinda, Jakarta, and finished in Palembang, South Sumatera. The journey involved 45 torchbearers for every single leg of the relay.

== Marketing ==
=== Logo ===
Modo and Modi, the Komodo dragons, the official mascots of the games.

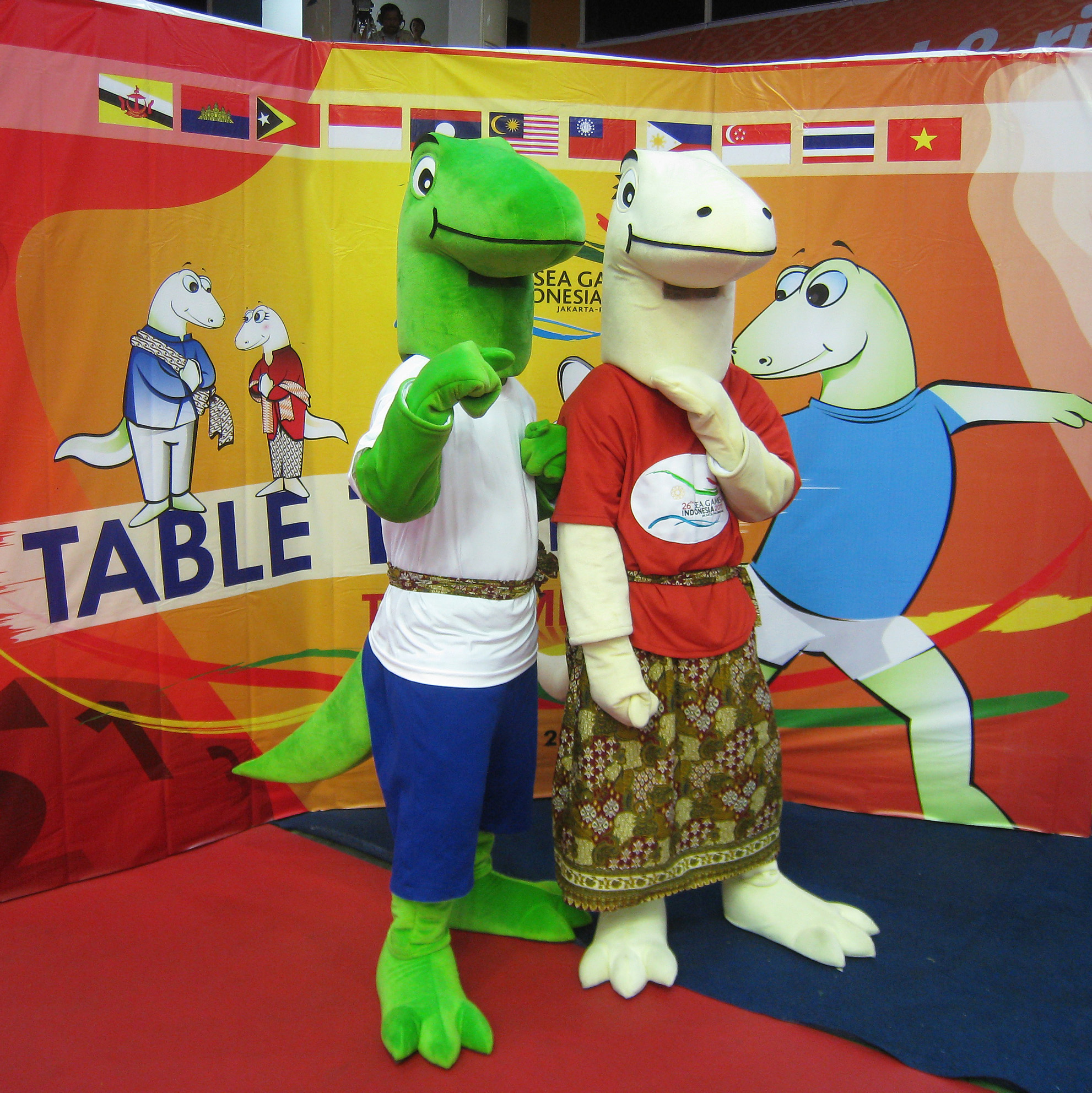
Modo and Modi mascots at one of the SEA Games venue.

The official logo of the 2011 Southeast Asian Games is a Garuda image, which also the national symbol of Indonesia. The logo that depicts the philosophy of "Garuda flight above Indonesian nature". Physical appearance of Garuda represents strength, while its wings epitomises glory and splendor. The upper green strokes symbolise the islands, forests, and mountainous terrain of the Indonesian archipelago, while the blue strokes epitomises the vast Nusantara ocean which unifies differences. Land and water or Tanah Air in Indonesian means homeland. The red strokes represent courage, zeal, and burning passion to give the best for the country. This logo was introduced during SEA Games Preparation Ministerial Meeting in Jakarta, 3 December 2010, and launched to the public in a celebration of 300 days before the opening ceremony, 15 January 2011 at Teater Tanah Airku, Taman Mini Indonesia Indah.

=== Mascot ===
The official mascots of the 2011 Southeast Asian Games are a pair of Komodo dragons named Modo and Modi. Modo is a male Komodo dragon wearing a blue traditional Indonesian costume and a batik sarong, while Modi is a female Komodo dragon wearing a red kebaya with a batik sash and pants. The mascots were adopted from Komodo dragons, an endemic Indonesian fauna native to Komodo, Rinca, and Padar islands in East Nusa Tenggara. The mascots were introduced and launched 200 days before the SEA Games XXVI, on Monday 25 April 2011 in three places: in Jakarta, Tanah Airku Theatre in Taman Mini Indonesia Indah and Selamat Datang Monument in Central Jakarta. "Modo" is a short name for Komodo, while "Modo-Modi" is a modified spelling of Muda-Mudi which means "youth" in Indonesian language, derived from pemuda (male youth) and pemudi (female youth).

Previously, the government of Palembang had chosen the Sumatran elephant as the mascot through an open contest, but there was a suggestion from President Susilo Bambang Yudhoyono and the National Sports Committee of Indonesia to use rajawali instead. The rajawali is an Indonesian hawk. Then both Sumatran elephants and Javan hawk-eagles were discarded in favour of Komodo dragons. The choosing of Komodo dragons for the Games' mascots was in line with an Indonesian effort to promote Komodo National Park as a New7Wonders of Nature candidate.

=== Songs ===
The 2011 Southeast Asian Games' first theme song, "Ayo Indonesia Bisa" (Come on, Indonesia, you can) was composed by Yovie Widianto and sung by vocalist Ello featuring Sherina Munaf duet vocalist pop music soloist, was the official theme anthem of the 2011 Southeast Asian Games. The second theme song "Kita Bisa" (We Can) was composed by Yovie Widianto and sung by Dudi Nuno, Dikta Nuno, Ello, Judika, Terry, Astrid and Lala Karmela (credited as Yovie and Friends). A music video of the second theme song, featuring the singers and Indonesian athletes and accompanied by the Victorian Phillaharmonic Orchestra was also released. At the closing ceremony, the song "Kita Bisa" was played just after the torch was extinguished.

The official theme song of the opening ceremony "Together We Will Shine" composed by Addie MS and Jozef Cleber was performed at the opening ceremony by Agnes Monica from Indonesia, Jaclyn Victor from Malaysia, and KC Concepcion from Philippines.

=== Sponsors ===
Sponsors of the 2011 Southeast Asian Games
Prestige Sponsors
- Artha Graha Peduli Foundation
- Bank Mandiri
- Garuda Indonesia
- Media Nusantara Citra
- Panasonic
- Indofood
- Indosat
- Samsung Electronics
- Unilever (Clear)
Sponsors
- 21 Cineplex
- Axa Mandiri Financial Services
- Coca-Cola
- Daihatsu
- Mitsubishi Motors
- Nestlé (Milo)
- Oso Drinking Water
- Plaza Senayan
- Recapital
- The Sultan Hotel & Residence Jakarta

== The Games ==
=== Opening ceremony ===
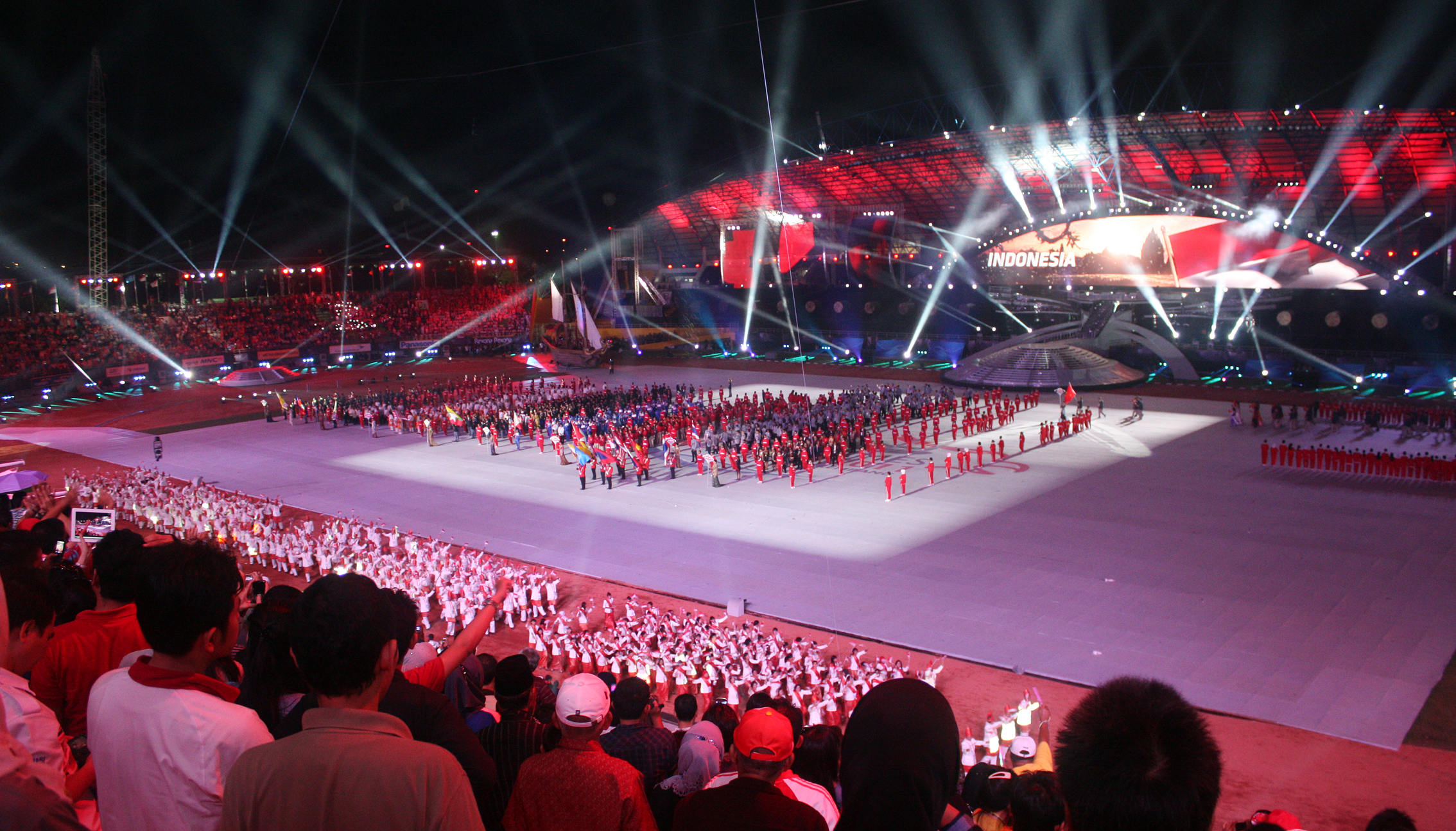
The athletes from host country Indonesia marching during 26th SEA Games opening ceremony, Friday, 11 November 2011. Gelora Sriwijaya Stadium, Palembang, Indonesia.

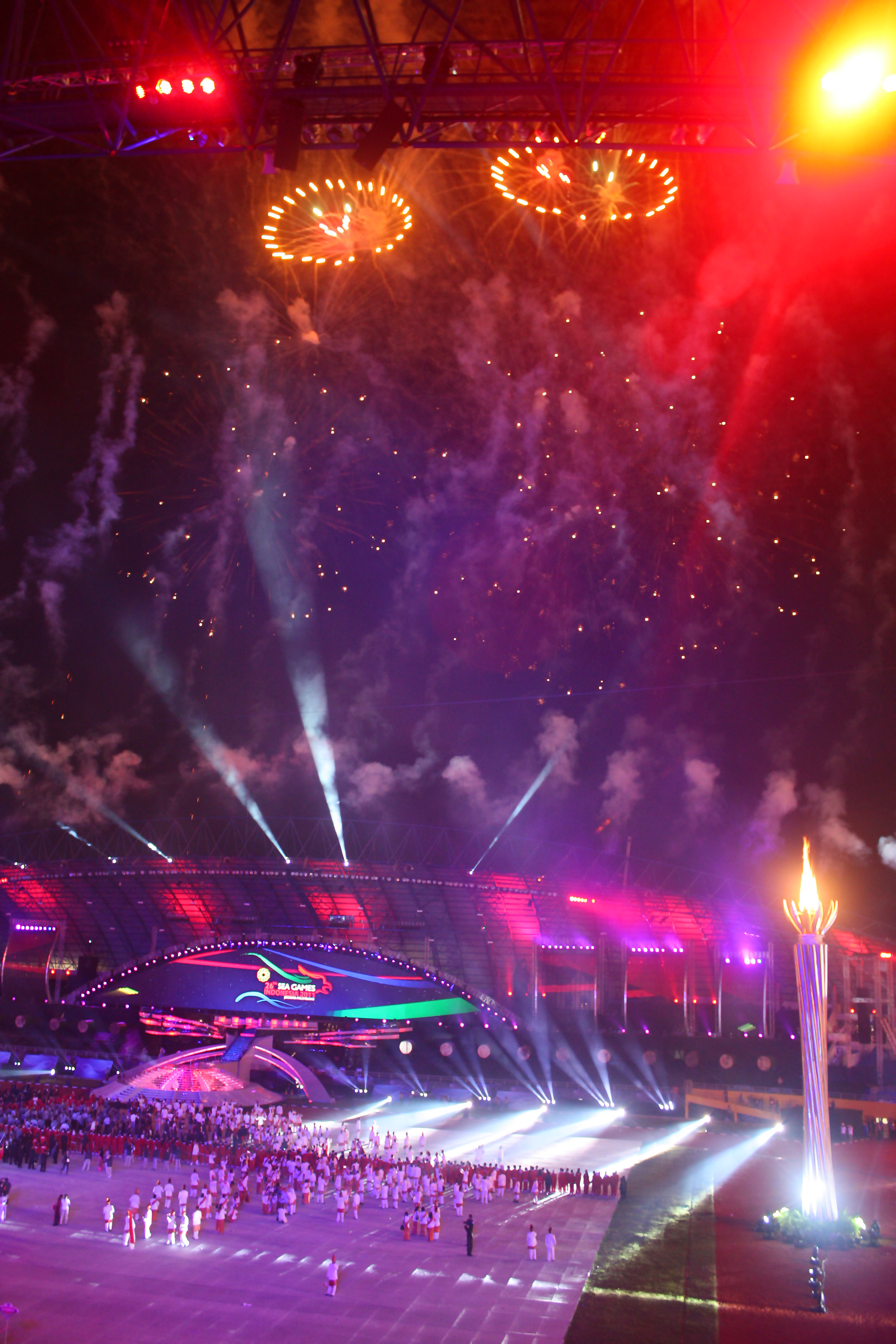
The fireworks after the torch lighting marked the beginning of XXVI Southeast Asia Games 2011 in Palembang, South Sumatera, Indonesia, Friday, 11 November 2011.

On 10 November 2011 (a day before opening ceremony) the Sea Games torch flame ceremony was held along Musi River in front of Kuto Besak fort. The opening ceremony officially began at 7:00 pm on 11 November 2011 in Gelora Sriwijaya Stadium. The date was chosen because its unique numbers of the date 11 November 2011 (11.11.11). The main event of opening ceremony with musical and dance performances and also parade of athletes of participating nations, were held in Gelora Sriwijaya Stadium.

The 26th SEA Games opening ceremony in Palembang was the first SEA Games to utilise spider camera, large LED screen and large-format projection technology provided by Australian-based Electric Canvas. The mass dance performance featured "The Glory of Srivijaya" as the theme.

Indra Yudhistira directed and concepted the opening ceremony with assistance by music director, Erwin Gutawa and choreographers such as Ari Tulang, Deddy Pudja, Hartati, and Alex Hassim, as well as percussionist Ade Rudiana. The Games' theme song, Together We'll Shine was sung by three Southeast Asian female singers, dubbed as Southeast Asian divas, Agnes Monica of Indonesia, Jaclyn Victor of Malaysia and KC Concepcion of the Philippines. Numerous other Indonesian singers was also given the spotlight during the ceremony. Unlike other opening ceremonies of previous games, Palembang presented an artistic vehicle parade and breathtaking theatrics in the lighting of the flame. The artistic vehicles represented the participating nations and featuring famous symbols and landmarks of each nations, such as Komodo and Borobudur float representing Indonesia, Wat Phra Kaew chedi and giant's head representing Thailand, Petronas Towers and Putra Mosque representing Malaysia, and Angkor Bayon temple representing Cambodia. The national floats were leading in front of parading athletes of each respected countries. The parading athletes were accompanied by the traditional Indonesian musics from distinct archipelagic regions.

The eternal flame from Mrapen entered the stadium as a continuation of the Palembang torch relay leg from the outside. The Southeast Asian Games torch was relayed around the stadium by 4 athletes, and was finally passed on to Susi Susanti, 1992 Summer Olympics gold medalist in Badminton. Susi Susanti was later suspended by wires, carrying the torch and appeared to run horizontally along the stadium started from the ancient Srivijaya junk to the cauldron and attempted to light the flame with the torch but failed. But fortunately though, at the final moment, a spotlight revealed the final resting place of the Southeast Asian Games flame, which had appeared during the torch run. A colossal torch situated at the top of the stadium was lit by a proportionately large Constructor. The 2011 Southeast Asian Games's second official theme song "Kita Bisa", composed by Addie MS, with lyrics by Jozef Cleber, was performed in the opening ceremony by Dudi Oris, Pradikta Wicaksono, Ello, Judika Nalon Abadi Sihotang, Terryana Fatiah, Astrid Sartiasari and Lala Karmela, accompanied by Victorian Philharmonic Orchestra.

=== Closing ceremony ===
The closing ceremony was held on 22 November 2011 at Gelora Sriwijaya Stadium. During the closing ceremony, Indonesia, the hosts and the overall champions of the games, passed the SEA Games Federation flag to Myanmar, the host of the next edition of the games. Lala Karmela performed the Southeast Asian Games song "Kita Bisa" just after the torch was extinguished.

=== Participating nations ===
- Brunei (60)
- Cambodia (163)
- Indonesia (1,053) (host)
- Laos (223)
- Malaysia (608)
- Myanmar (477)
- Philippines (512)
- Singapore (419)
- Thailand (766)
- Timor-Leste (76)
- Vietnam (608)

=== Sports ===
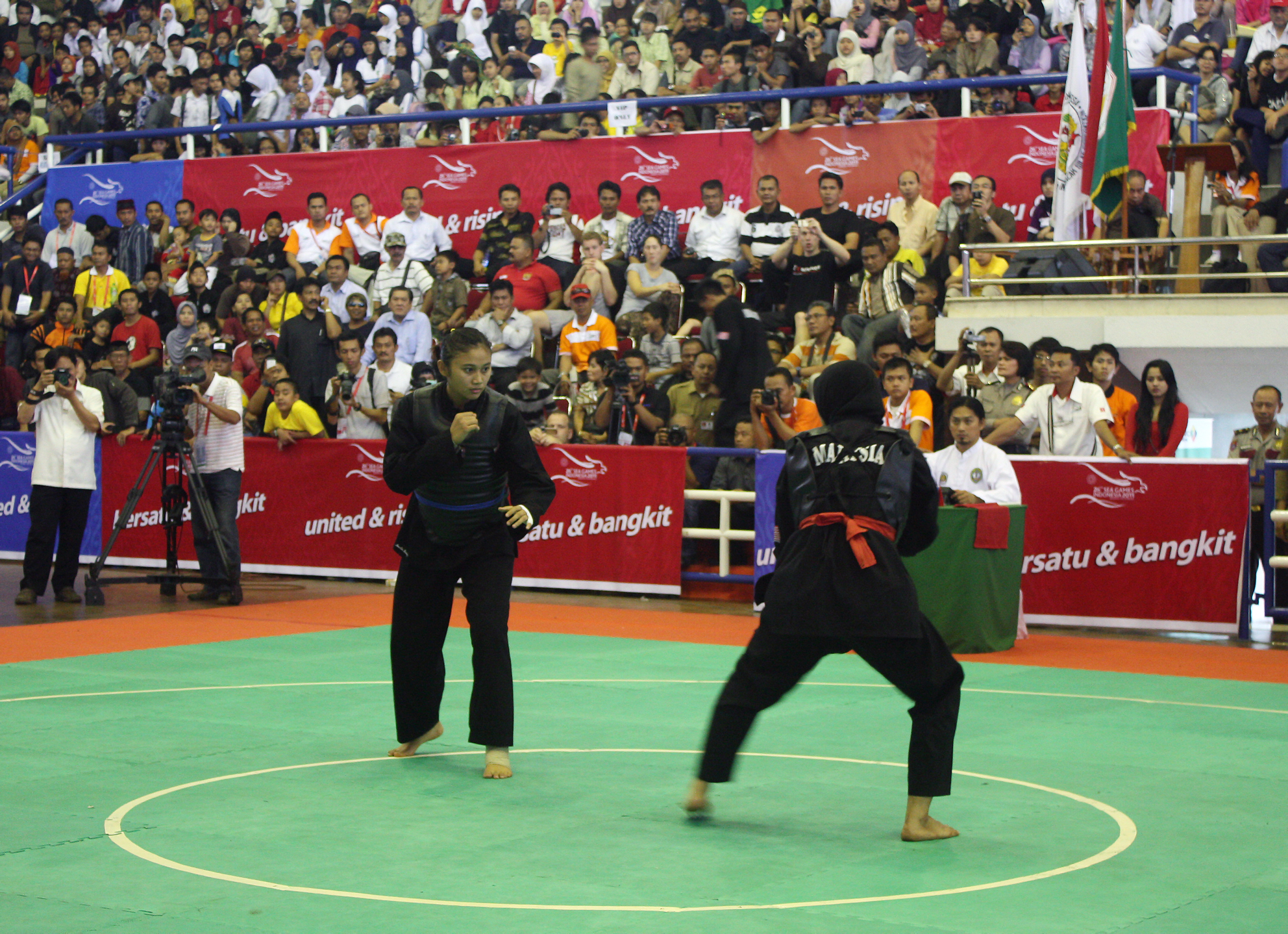
Amelia Roring of Indonesia competing against Siti Rahmah Mohd Nasir of Malaysia in the women's Pencak Silat class E 65 – 70 kg final.

The 2011 Southeast Asian Games featured 545 events in 44 sports and disciplines, in which two of them are demonstration sports.

During the SEA Games Federation Council Meeting in Hotel Mulia, Jakarta, in May 2010, the SEAGF Sports and Rules Committee proposed three categories of sports to be competed during the Games. The meeting also saw an increase of the number of sports to be competed, such as paragliding, competition climbing, roller skating, bridge, futsal, and soft tennis. Although the other Southeast Asian countries proposed arnis, muay thai, hockey, netball, pétanque, squash, triathlon and rugby union, they were not selected.

Tarung Derajat, an Indonesian martial art, and cricket, were held as exhibition sports at the Games.

- Archery (10)
- Athletics (46)
- Aquatics (57)
  - Diving (8)
  - Swimming (38)
  - Synchronised swimming (5)
  - Open water swimming (4)
  - Water polo (2)
- Badminton (7)
- Baseball (1)
- Basketball (2)
- Billiards and snooker (10) ¹
- Bowling (10) ¹
- Boxing (14)
- Bridge (9) ³
- Canoeing (15)
- Chess (9) ¹
- Competition climbing (10) ʰ
- Cycling (18)
  - BMX racing
  - Mountain biking
  - Road cycling
  - Track cycling
- Equestrian (6)
- Fencing (12)
- Finswimming (16) ²
- Football (3)
  - Football (1)
  - Futsal (2)
- Golf (4)
- Gymnastics (17)
  - Artistic
  - Rhythmic
  - Aerobic
- Judo (16)
- Karate (17) ¹
- Shorinji Kempo (16) ʰ
- Paragliding (12) ³
- Pencak silat (18) ²
- Pétanque (6) ²
- Roller skating (12) ʰ
- Rowing (12)
- Sailing (9)
- Sepak takraw (6) ²
- Shooting (14)
- Softball (2) °
- Soft tennis (7) °
- Table tennis (5)
- Taekwondo (21)
- Tennis (7)
- Traditional boat race (10) ¹
- Volleyball (4)
  - Beach
  - Indoor
- Vovinam (14) ²
- Water skiing (11) ʰ
- Weightlifting (14)
- Wrestling (17)
- Wushu (20) ¹

Demonstration sports:

- Cricket
- Tarung Derajat – a Sundanese martial art

¹ – not an official Olympic Sport
² – sport played only in the SEAG
³ – not a traditional Olympic nor SEAG Sport and introduced only by the host country.
° – a former official Olympic Sport, not applied in previous host countries and was introduced only by the host country.
ʰ- sport not played in the previous edition and was reintroduced by the host country.

=== Calendar ===
OC	Opening ceremony	●	Event competitions	1	Gold medal events	CC	Closing ceremony

November	3 Thu	4 Fri	5 Sat	6 Sun	7 Mon	8 Tue	9 Wed	10 Thu	11 Fri	12 Sat	13 Sun	14 Mon	15 Tue	16 Wed	17 Thu	18 Fri	19 Sat	20 Sun	21 Mon	22 Tue	Gold medal events
Ceremonies									OC											CC	
Archery											●	●	2	2	4	2					10
Athletics										11	12	10	11	2							46
Badminton										●	●	●	2	●	●	●	5				7
Baseball											●	●	●	●	●	●	●	1			1
Basketball										●	●	●	●	●	●	●	2				2
Bowling												●	2	2	2	2	●	2			10
Boxing												●	●	●	●	●	6	●	8		14
Bridge										●	●	2	2	●	1	1	●	2	1		9
Canoeing								●	5	3	7										15
Chess									●	●	●	●	●	3	●	●	●	2	4		2
Competition climbing										●	●	●	●	4	4	2					9
Cue sports										●	2	●	3	●	2	●	3				10
Cycling											2	1	2	1	1	2	4	2	3		18
Diving											2	2	2	2							8
Equestrian													●	●	1	2	1	1	1		6
Fencing											2	2	2	2	2	2					12
Fin swimming																	5	6	5		16
Football	●		●		●		●		●	●	●		●		●		●		1		1
Futsal															●	●	●	●	●	2	2
Golf												●	●	●	2	●	●	●	2		4
Gymnastics										1	1	2	5	5		●	1		2		17
Judo															4	4	4	4			16
Karate										7	8	2									17
Kenpō														●	●	4	4	8			16
Open water swimming															2	●	2				4
Paragliding										●	●	●	●	●	●	●	●	●	●	12	12
Pencak silat										●	6	●	●		12						18
Petanque										●	2	●	2	●	2						6
Roller sport										4	4	4									12
Rowing												●	●	5	6						11
Sailing											●		●	●	●	●	●	9			9
Sepak takraw									●	●	●	●	2	●	●	2	●	●	●	2	6
Shooting										3	3	3	2	3							14
Soft tennis															2	2	2	1			7
Softball										●	●	●	●	●	●	●	2				10
Swimming										6	6	7	7	6	6						38
Synchronized swimming															●	●	3	2			5
Table tennis											●	1	2	2							5
Taekwondo										7	4	6	4								21
Tennis											●	●	2	●	●	●	●	2	3		7
Traditional boat race																●	4	4	2		10
Volleyball										●	●	●	●	●	●	●	2	2			4
Vovinam												●	7	7							14
Water polo								●	●	1	●	●	●	●	●	●	●	1			2
Waterskiing													●	●	●	5	6				11
Weightlifting																4	4	3	3		14
Wrestling												5	4	4	4						17
Wushu																2	4	4	10		20
Total gold medal events	0	0	0	0	0	0	0	0	5	43	61	54	65	43	57	36	64	56	44	17	545
Cumulative total	0	0	0	0	0	0	0	0	5	48	109	163	228	271	328	364	428	484	528	545	545
November	3 Thu	4 Fri	5 Sat	6 Sun	7 Mon	8 Tue	9 Wed	10 Thu	11 Fri	12 Sat	13 Sun	14 Mon	15 Tue	16 Wed	17 Thu	18 Fri	19 Sat	20 Sun	21 Mon	22 Tue	Gold medal events

=== Medal table ===
A total of 1,807 medals, comprising 554 gold medals, 549 silver medals, and 704 bronze medals were awarded to athletes. Host Indonesia's performance was their best ever yet in Southeast Asian Games history and emerged as overall champions of the games. Timor-Leste claimed its first ever gold medal in the SEA Games in the sport of Shorinji Kempo, while Brunei is the only country this year that failed to capture any gold medal.

Key

* Host nation (Indonesia)

Rank	Nation	Gold	Silver	Bronze	Total
1	Indonesia*	182	151	143	476
2	Thailand	109	101	119	329
3	Vietnam	96	92	100	288
4	Malaysia	58	50	81	189
5	Singapore	42	45	74	161
6	Philippines	37	55	77	169
7	Myanmar	16	27	37	80
8	Laos	9	12	36	57
9	Cambodia	4	11	24	39
10	Timor-Leste	1	1	6	8
11	Brunei	0	4	7	11
Totals (11 entries)		554	549	704	1,807

Medal change

Malaysian sprinter Muhamad Yunus Lasaleh was tested positive for doping. Thus, his relay team was stripped of the gold medal.

Ruling date	Sport	Event	Nation	Gold	Silver	Bronze	Total
2012	Athletics	Men's 4×400 metres relay	Malaysia	−1			−1
2012	Athletics	Men's 4×400 metres relay	Philippines	+1	−1		0
2012	Athletics	Men's 4×400 metres relay	Thailand		+1	−1	0
2012	Athletics	Men's 4×400 metres relay	Singapore			+1	+1

== Concerns and controversies ==
At SEA Games Federation Meeting in Bali, February 2011, Malaysia appealed for the reinclusion of 60 dropped events, but then the federation rejected the appeal from Olympic Council of Malaysia. Datuk Zolkples Embong, the director-general of the council, said:

"Why should we [Malaysia] waste time and money to send the elite athletes if it is only for a small gain."

Organization

To anticipate the lack of rooms of hotels and athlete's villages in Palembang, the organizers prepared ships from Pelni and Indonesian navy as an alternative accommodation for delegates. Some sepak takraw umpires left one of the ships earlier and decided to rent a house, citing lack of bathrooms inside the ship. A local journalist said that the facilities on the ship were good, but they were unpopular due to the distance from the competition venues.

More than 300 becak drivers were recruited as the main transport around Jakabaring sport complex. The drivers were promised a 200,000 rupiah daily stipend for providing free transport service during the Games but they were not paid for first 3 days of the Games, prompting the drivers to charge athletes and officials with fares as high as 75,000 rupiah. The situation was resolved after the organizers paid the late stipends to the drivers.

Two football fans died and many others fainted in a crowd crush at Gelora Bung Karno main stadium before the final football match between Indonesia and Malaysia. INASOC ticketing manager, Agus Mauro, explained that many fans without tickets attempted to break into the entrance gates which caused a crowd crush.

Controversial decision

The gold medal rewarded for Indonesian Dian Kristanto in the Class A Pencak Silat finals has raised criticisms from some countries, namely: Singapore, Thailand, and Vietnam. Singaporean Pencak Silat referee Jasni Salam and announced Kristanto the winner after he had bitten Anothai Choopeng.

Vietnam Television at late night gave a comment with quotation from Anothai Choopeng "Except Indonesian here every single body finds who is worth winning. I am truly disappointed with the behaviours from the set of referees. They always do everything to make the host country win."

== See also ==
- 2011 ASEAN Para Games
- 2018 Asian Games

Preceded by Vientiane	Southeast Asian Games; Jakarta–Palembang; XXVI Southeast Asian Games (2011)	Succeeded by Naypyidaw
