= Timor-Leste at the 2021 SEA Games =

Timor-Leste at the 21 Southeast Asian Games
- IOC code: TLS
- NOC: National Olympic Committee of Timor Leste

in Hanoi, Vietnam 12–23 May 2022
- Competitors: 69
- Flag bearer: Ana da Costa da Silva (taekwondo)
- Medals Ranked 11th: Gold 0 Silver 3 Bronze 2 Total 5

Southeast Asian Games appearances (overview)
- 2003; 2005; 2007; 2009; 2011; 2013; 2015; 2017; 2019; 2021; 2023; 2025; 2027; 2029

Timor-Leste participated at the 2021 Southeast Asian Games in Hanoi, Vietnam from 12 to 23 May 2022. The Timorese contingent consisted of 69 athletes. Despite the small number, this contingent won 3 silver and 2 bronze medals. Felisberto de Deus won Timor-Leste's first ever medal in athletics.

== Medal summary ==
=== Medal by sport ===
Medals by sport
Sport	1st place, gold medalist(s)	2nd place, silver medalist(s)	3rd place, bronze medalist(s)	Total	Rank
Athletics	0	2	0	2	7
Boxing	0	1	1	2	7
Taekwondo	0	0	1	1	10
Total	0	3	2	5	11

=== Medalists ===
Medal	Name	Sport	Event
Silver	Felisberto de Deus	Athletics	Men's 5000 m
Silver	Felisberto de Deus	Athletics	Men's 10000 m
Silver	Delio Anzaqeci Mouzinho	Boxing	Men's Middleweight (75 kg)
Bronze	Jose Quintas Da Silva Barreto	Boxing	Men's Bantamweight (57 kg)
Bronze	Santina Adelaide de Dousa Fernandez	Taekwondo	Women's kyorugi Flyweight 49 kg
