= Between Us =

Between Us may refer to:

- Between Us (2003 film), a short film by Laurits Munch-Petersen
- Between Us (2004 film), a short film by Charlotte Bruus Christensen
- Between Us (2011 film), a Mexican comedy film
- Between Us (2012 film), an American film, based on the play of the same name
- Between Us (2016 film), an American drama film
- Between Us (2023 film), a French drama film
- Between Us (2023 film), a Ukrainian drama and thriller film
- Between Us (2024 film), a Peruvian mystery thriller film
- Between Us (Hayden James album), 2019
- Between Us (Lala Karmela album), 2013
- Between Us (Little Mix album), 2021
- Between Us (Murray Head album), 1979
- Between Us (Steve Cole album), 2000
- Between Us (Tab Two album), 1999
- "Between Us" (CNBLUE song), 2017
- Between Us, a Swedish band with releases from Burning Heart Records
- "Between Us", by Lala Karmela from the album Between Us
- "Between us", by Streetwalkers from the album Red Card
- "Everything (Between Us)", by Liz Phair from the album Somebody's Miracle

== See also ==
- Just Between Us (disambiguation)
