= Timor-Leste at the 2011 SEA Games =

Timor-Leste at the 2011 Southeast Asian Games
- IOC code: TLS
- NOC: National Olympic Committee of East Timor

in Jakarta and Palembang
- Competitors: 93
- Officials: 0
- Medals Ranked 10th: Gold 1 Silver 1 Bronze 6 Total 8

Southeast Asian Games appearances (overview)
- 2003; 2005; 2007; 2009; 2011; 2013; 2015; 2017; 2019; 2021; 2023; 2025; 2027; 2029

East Timor participated at the 2011 Southeast Asian Games which were held in the cities of Palembang and Jakarta, Indonesia from 11 November 2011 to 22 November 2011. East Timor got its first ever gold medal since it joined the SEA Games.

== Medals ==
=== Medal table ===
Sport	Gold	Silver	Bronze	Total
Shinjo Kempo	1	1	4	6
Taekwondo	0	0	1	1
Boxing	0	0	1	1
Total	1	1	6	8

=== Medals by date ===
Daily: Overall Medals
Day	Date	Gold medal	Silver medal	Bronze medal	Total
Day 1	11th	0	0	0	0
Day 2	12th	0	0	0	0
Day 3	13th	0	0	0	0
Day 4	14th	0	0	1	1
Day 5	15th	0	0	0	0
Day 6	16th	0	0	0	0
Day 7	17th	0	0	1	1
Day 8	18th	0	0	2	2
Day 9	19th	1	1	1	3
Day 10	20th	0	0	1	1
Day 11	21st	0	0	0	0
Day 12	22nd	0	0	0	0

== Medalists ==
Medal	Name	Sport	Event
Gold	Julianto Pereira; Dorceyana Borges	Kenpō	Mixed kumi embu pair kyu kenshi
Silver	Domingos Savio; Fidelia Da Costa Pereira	Kenpō	Mixed kumi embu pair yudansha
Bronze	Abrao Pinto; Antonio Manuel	Kenpō	Men's kumi embu pair kyu kenshi
Bronze	Eugenio Ribeiro; Domingos Savio	Kenpō	Men's kumi embu pair yudansha
Bronze	Antonio Manuel; Lola Caldas Da Silva Da Costa; Julianto Pereira; Abrao Pinto; Dorceyana Borges; Mekita Lebre	Kenpō	Mixed dantai embu group kyu kenshi
Bronze	Mekita Lebre	Kenpō	Women's 54 kg randori
Bronze	Elio Jenoveva	Boxing	Men's welterweight 69 kg
Bronze	Luisa dos Santos	Taekwondo	Women's finweight (under 46 kg)
