= Boxing at the 2013 SEA Games =

Boxing competitions

Boxing at the 2013 SEA Games took place at Wunna Theikdi Boxing Indoor Stadium, Naypyidaw, Myanmar between December 8–14.

== Medal table ==
* Host nation (Myanmar)

Rank	Nation	Gold	Silver	Bronze	Total
1	Thailand	7	2	1	10
2	Philippines	3	4	3	10
3	Myanmar*	2	2	2	6
4	Vietnam	2	1	5	8
5	Indonesia	0	4	4	8
6	Malaysia	0	1	3	4
7	Laos	0	0	4	4
8	Singapore	0	0	2	2
9	Timor-Leste	0	0	1	1
Totals (9 entries)		14	14	25	53

== Medalists ==
=== Men ===
Event	Gold	Silver	Bronze
46–49 kg	Mark Anthony Barriga; Philippines	Konelis Kwangu Langu; Indonesia	Mohd Fuan Mohd Reuvan; Malaysia
46–49 kg	Mark Anthony Barriga; Philippines	Konelis Kwangu Langu; Indonesia	Bounpone Lasavanesy; Laos
52 kg	Chatchai Butdee; Thailand	Mg Nge; Myanmar	Tran Phu Cuong; Vietnam
52 kg	Chatchai Butdee; Thailand	Mg Nge; Myanmar	Rey Saludar; Philippines
56 kg	Mario Fernandez; Philippines	Donchai Thathi; Thailand	Tran Quoc Viet; Vietnam
56 kg	Mario Fernandez; Philippines	Donchai Thathi; Thailand	Muhammad Solihin Nordin; Singapore
60 kg	Sailom Adi; Thailand	Junel Cantancio; Philippines	Nguyen Van Hai; Vietnam
60 kg	Sailom Adi; Thailand	Junel Cantancio; Philippines	Muhammad Ridhwan Ahmad; Singapore
64 kg	Wuttichai Masuk; Thailand	Dennis Galvan; Philippines	Khir Azmi; Malaysia
64 kg	Wuttichai Masuk; Thailand	Dennis Galvan; Philippines	Ericok Amanopunyo; Indonesia
69 kg	Apichet Saenset; Thailand	Ramkumar Govindasyui; Malaysia	Koes Diyono; Indonesia
69 kg	Apichet Saenset; Thailand	Ramkumar Govindasyui; Malaysia	Elio Jenoveva Edito; Timor-Leste
75 kg	Wailin Aung; Myanmar	Wilfredo Lopez; Philippines	Truong Dinh Hoang; Vietnam
75 kg	Wailin Aung; Myanmar	Wilfredo Lopez; Philippines	Alex Tatontos; Indonesia
81 kg	Anavat Thongrathok; Thailand	Kristianus; Indonesia	Azman Mansor; Malaysia
81 kg	Anavat Thongrathok; Thailand	Kristianus; Indonesia	Loung Van Toan; Vietnam

=== Women ===
Event	Gold	Silver	Bronze
45–48 kg	Josie Gabuco; Philippines	Beatrix Suguro; Indonesia	Sonrka Chanthavonrsa; Laos
45–48 kg	Josie Gabuco; Philippines	Beatrix Suguro; Indonesia	Thet Hter San; Myanmar
51 kg	Sopida Satumrum; Thailand	Nguyen Thi Yen; Vietnam	Maricris Igram; Philippines
51 kg	Sopida Satumrum; Thailand	Nguyen Thi Yen; Vietnam	Meovady Hongfa; Laos
54 kg	Peamwilai Laopeam; Thailand	Ester Kalayuk; Indonesia	Irish Magno; Philippines
54 kg	Peamwilai Laopeam; Thailand	Ester Kalayuk; Indonesia	Vilaphone Tawan; Laos
57 kg	Nwe Ni Oo; Myanmar	Nesthy Petecio; Philippines	Imaculata Loda; Indonesia
57 kg	Nwe Ni Oo; Myanmar	Nesthy Petecio; Philippines	Tassamalee Thongjan; Thailand
60 kg	Lieu Thi Duyen; Vietnam	Sudaporan Seesondee; Thailand	Khine Khin Oo; Myanmar
64 kg	Ha Thi Linh; Vietnam	Kyu Kyu Hlaing; Myanmar	

== Results ==
=== Men ===
==== 46-49 kg ====
Quarterfinal; December 10		Semifinal; December 13		Final; December 14
Mohd Fuad Mohd Reuvan (MAS)	3
Ddabilio C.Suva (TLS)	0	Mohd Fuad Mohd Reuvan (MAS)	1
Mark Anthony Barriga (PHI)	2	Mark Anthony Barriga (PHI)	2
Huynu Ngoc Tan (VIE)	1			Mark Anthony Barriga (PHI)	3
Bounpone Lasavonesy (LAO)	2			Konelis Kwangu Langu (INA)	0
Nat Seiknin (CAM)	1	Bounpone Lasavonesy (LAO)	0
Konelis Kwangu Langu (INA)	3	Konelis Kwangu Langu (INA)	3
Lin Htut Paing (MYA)	0

==== 52 kg ====
Quarterfinal; December 08		Semifinal; December 13		Final; December 14
		Rey Saludar (PHI)	0
Julio Bria (INA)	1	Mg Nge (MYA)	3
Mg Nge (MYA)	2			Mg Nge (MYA)	0
Hanandeen Hamid (SIN)	0			Chatchai Butdee (THA)	3
Chatchai Butdee (THA)	3	Chatchai Butdee (THA)	3
Tran Phu Cuong (VIE)	2	Tran Phu Cuong (VIE)	0
Hatsnai Phoilavy (LAO)	1

==== 56 kg ====
Quarterfinal; December 08		Semifinal; December 13		Final; December 14
		Mario Fernandez (PHI)	3
Tran Quoc Viet (VIE)	3	Tran Quoc Viet (VIE)	0
Thongbang Seuaphorn (LAO)	0			Mario Fernandez (PHI)	3
Lamda Long (CAM)	0			Donchai Thathi (THA)	0
Donchai Thathi (THA)	3	Donchai Thathi (THA)	TKO
		Muhammad Solihin Nordin (SIN)

==== 60 kg ====
Quarterfinal; December 10		Semifinal; December 13		Final; December 14
Keochi Xayyasane (LAO)	0
Junel Cantancio (PHI)	3	Junel Cantancio (PHI)	3
Kyaw Kyaw Htet (MYA)	0	Muhamad Ridhwan Ahmad (SIN)	0
Muhamad Ridhwan Ahmad (SIN)	3			Junel Cantancio (PHI)	1
Nguyen Van Hai (VIE)	3			Sayiom Ardee (THA)	2
Sophorn Phal (CAM)	0	Nguyen Van Hai (VIE)	1
Sayiom Ardee (THA)	3	Sayiom Ardee (THA)	2
Alnasrul Osman (MAS)	0

==== 64 kg ====
Quarterfinal; December 08		Semifinal; December 13		Final; December 14
Udone Khanxay (LAO)	0
Khir Azmi (MAS)	3	Khir Azmi (MAS)	0
Ye Naing (MYA)	0	Wuttichai Masuk (THA)	3
Wuttichai Masuk (THA)	3			Wuttichai Masuk (THA)	3
Jun Hao Leong (SIN)	1			Dennis Galvan (PHI)	0
Ericok Amanopunyo (INA)	2	Ericok Amanopunyo (INA)	1
Ratha Svay (CAM)	0	Dennis Galvan (PHI)	2
Dennis Galvan (PHI)	3

==== 69 kg ====
Quarterfinal; December 08		Semifinal; December 13		Final; December 14
		Koes Diyono (INA)
Pisey Srun (CAM)		Apichet Saenset (THA)	TKO
Apichet Saenset (THA)	TKO			Apichet Saenset (THA)	TKO
				Ramkumar Govindasyui (MAS)
		Ramkumar Govindasyui (MAS)	TKO
		Elio Jenoveva Edito (TLS)

==== 75 kg ====
Quarterfinal; December 10		Semifinal; December 13		Final; December 14
		Wailin Aung (MYA)	3
Hoang Truong Dinh (VIE)	2	Hoang Truong Dinh (VIE)	0
Rudy Petrus (MAS)	1			Wailin Aung (MYA)	TKO
				Wilfredo Lopez (PHI)
		Alex Tatontos (INA)	1
		Wilfredo Lopez (PHI)	2

==== 81 kg ====
Quarterfinal; December 10		Semifinal; December 13		Final; December 14
		Kristianus (INA)	2
Toan Loung Van (VIE)	3	Toan Loung Van (VIE)	1
Chhoung Sokleng (CAM)	0			Kristianus (INA)	1
Zakaria Ismail (SIN)	0			Anavat Thongrathok (THA)	2
Azman Mansor (MAS)	3	Azman Mansor (MAS)	0
Aung Ko Ko (MYA)	1	Anavat Thongrathok (THA)	3
Anavat Thongrathok (THA)	2

=== Women ===
==== 45-48 kg ====
Quarterfinal	Semifinal; December 12		Final; December 14
	Sonrka Chanthavonrsa (LAO)	0
	Josie Gabuco (PHI)	3
			Josie Gabuco (PHI)	2
			Beatrix Suguro (INA)	0
	Thet Hter San (MYA)	1
	Beatrix Suguro (INA)	2

==== 51 kg ====
Quarterfinal; December 09		Semifinal; December 12		Final; December 14
		Meovady Hongfa (LAO)	0
Nguyen Thi Yen (VIE)	3	Nguyen Thi Yen (VIE)	3
Warni Halawa (INA)	0			Nguyen Thi Yen (VIE)	1
				Sopida Satumrum (THA)	2
		Sopida Satumrum (THA)	3
		Maricris Igam (PHI)	0

==== 54 kg ====
Quarterfinal; December 09		Semifinal; December 12		Final; December 14
		Irish Magno (PHI)	0
Le Thi Bang (VIE)	1	Peamwilai Laopeam (THA)	2
Peamwilai Laopeam (THA)	2			Peamwilai Laopeam (THA)	3
				Ester Kalayukw (INA)	0
		Ester Kalayukw (INA)	3
		Vilaphone Tawan (LAO)	0

==== 57 kg ====
Quarterfinal	Semifinal; December 09		Final; December 14
	Nwe Ni Oo (MYA)	3
	Imacular Loda (INA)	0
			Nwe Ni Oo (MYA)	2
			Nesthy Petecio (PHI)	0
	Nesthy Petecio (PHI)	3
	Tassamalee Thongjan (THA)	0

==== 60 kg ====
Quarterfinal	Semifinal; December 09		Final; December 14
			Lieu Thi Duyen (VIE)	2
			Sudaporan Seesondee (THA)	1
	Sudaporan Seesondee (THA)	3
	Khine Khin Oo (MYA)	0

==== 64 kg ====
Quarterfinal	Semifinal	Final; December 14
		Ha Thi Linh (VIE)	2
		Kyu Kyu Hlaing (MYA)	1

Preceded by 2011	Boxing at the SEA Games; 2013 SEA Games	Succeeded by 2015
