= Timor-Leste at the 2025 SEA Games =

Timor-Leste at the 2025 Southeast Asian Games
- IOC code: TLS
- NOC: National Olympic Committee of Timor Leste

in Bangkok and Chonburi, Thailand 9 – 20 December 2025
- Competitors: 110 in 14 sports
- Flag bearers: Jolanio Guterres; Ana da Costa da Silva (opening)
- Medals Ranked 10th: Gold 0 Silver 1 Bronze 7 Total 8

Southeast Asian Games appearances (overview)
- 2003; 2005; 2007; 2009; 2011; 2013; 2015; 2017; 2019; 2021; 2023; 2025; 2027; 2029

Timor-Leste participated at the 33rd Southeast Asian (SEA) Games which was held from 9 to 20 December 2025 in Bangkok and Chonburi in Thailand. This was the first time that the country participated in the Games after it gained full ASEAN membership.

The delegation consisted of 110 athletes competing in 14 sports, down from 132 athletes that was initially reported.

== Competitors ==
The following is the list of the number of competitors participating at the Games per sport/discipline.

Sport	Men	Women	Total
Archery	1	1	2
Athletics	4	2	6
Boxing	7	2	9
Cycling	0	1	1
Esports	17	11	28
Football	22	0	22
Kabaddi	12	0	12
Karate	4	3	7
Modern pentathlon	2	0	2
Sepak takraw	6	0	6
Swimming	1	1	2
Taekwondo	3	6	9
Weightlifting	1	1	2
Wrestling	2	0	2
Total	82	28	110

== Medalists ==
Medal	Name	Sport	Event	Date
Silver	Elisio Raimundo Gaio	Boxing	Men's -63,5 kg	December 19
Bronze	Merlinda da Costa Soares; Dircia Adolfina Claudia Punef; Try Xena Lindsay da Costa Dias	Taekwondo	Women's recognized poomsae team	December 10
Bronze	Mota Messias Dates	Taekwondo	Men's kyorugi –80 kg	December 11
Bronze	Alexandre Meliano da Costa Freitas	Boxing	Men's -69 kg	December 15
Bronze	Antonio Nicolau Hau da Silva	Boxing	Men's -48 kg	December 16
Bronze	Titania da Silva Quintas	Boxing	Women's -66 kg	December 16
Bronze	Lucia Ventura Barreto de Jesus Pereira; Expedina dos Reis Soares; Aprilinha Teni Machado Maia Gama; Timorina Teni Maia; Fanencia Moreira Ximenes	Esports	Arena of Valor (women's team)	December 16
Bronze	Francisco Moratti Gaspar da Costa Lobo	Boxing	Men's -75 kg	December 17

== Football ==
Summary

Key:

- A.E.T – After extra time.
- P – Match decided by penalty-shootout.

Team	Event	Group Stage			Semifinal	Final / BM	
Team	Event	Opposition Score	Opposition Score	Rank	Opposition Score	Opposition Score	Rank
Timor-Leste men's	Men's tournament	Thailand; L 1–6	Singapore; W 3–1	2	Did not advance		

=== Men's tournament ===
Team roster

Timor-Leste announced their final squad on 3 December 2025.

Head coach: (Indonesia) Emral Abus

No.	Pos.	Player	Date of birth (age)	Caps	Goals	Club
1	GK	Egidio Luro	5 December 2008 (aged 16)	2	0	(East Timor Football Federation) Emmanuel
2	DF	Jackson Fowler	3 September 2004 (aged 21)	4	0	(Football Australia) Sydney Olympic
3	DF	Ricardo Bianco	15 January 2006 (aged 19)	6	1	(East Timor Football Federation) Ponta Leste
4	DF	Ryan Jom	3 March 2005 (aged 20)	0	0	(Football Australia) Rydalmere Lions
5	MF	Palomito Ribeiro	14 June 2005 (aged 20)	4	0	(East Timor Football Federation) Emmanuel
6	MF	Tristan Xavi	26 July 2008 (aged 17)	2	0	(Football Australia) Western Sydney Wanderers
7	FW	Luís Figo	17 April 2005 (aged 20)	7	2	(East Timor Football Federation) Ponta Leste
8	DF	Oatnasio Guterres	11 June 2006 (aged 19)	3	1	(Irish Football Association) Longhgall
9	FW	Olagar Xavier	18 May 2003 (aged 22)	0	0	(Philippine Football Federation) Aguilas–UMak
10	FW	Alexandro Bakhito	1 June 2006 (aged 19)	5	3	(East Timor Football Federation) SLB Laulara
11	MF	Zenivio	22 April 2005 (aged 20)	15	3	(Football Association of Singapore) Tanjong Pagar United
12	GK	Filonito Nogueira	16 November 2004 (aged 21)	2	0	(East Timor Football Federation) SLB Laulara
13	MF	Jonatas Pereira	24 June 2003 (aged 22)	1	0	(East Timor Football Federation) Emmanuel
14	DF	Aniso Monteiro	1 July 2003 (aged 22)	0	0	(East Timor Football Federation) Assalam
15	FW	Serafin Brito	unknown	2	0	(East Timor Football Federation) DIT
16	MF	Freteliano	9 August 2004 (aged 21)	8	1	(East Timor Football Federation) Emmanuel
17	DF	Mário Quintão	18 February 2004 (aged 21)	9	0	(East Timor Football Federation) Emmanuel
18	MF	Leonio Freitas	17 April 2007 (aged 18)	3	0	(East Timor Football Federation) Ponta Leste
19	FW	Vabio Canavaro	25 January 2007 (aged 18)	0	0	(East Timor Football Federation) Ponta Leste
21	FW	Gali Freitas	31 December 2004 (aged 20)	9	4	(Football Association of Indonesia) Persebaya Surabaya
22	FW	Paul Godinho	unknown	0	0	(East Timor Football Federation) Santa Cruz
23	DF	Anizo Correia	23 May 2003 (aged 22)	7	0	(East Timor Football Federation) Ponta Leste

Group play

Pos	Team	Pld	W	D	L	GF	GA	GD	Pts	Qualification
1	Thailand (H)	2	2	0	0	9	1	+8	6	Advance to knockout stage
2	Timor-Leste	2	1	0	1	4	7	−3	3	
3	Singapore	2	0	0	2	1	6	−5	0	

Source: Soccerway
Rules for classification: Group stage tiebreakers
(H) Hosts
3 December 2025
19:00

Timor-Leste	1–6	Thailand
Palomito 90+3'	Report	Yotsakorn B. 44', 70', 72'; Siraphop 49'; Iklas 60'; Kakana 83'

Rajamangala Stadium, Bangkok (Note: Originally planned to be held in Tinsulanon Stadium, but moved to Rajamangala Stadium due to safety concerns)
Attendance: 7,741
Referee: Choi Hyun-jai (South Korea)
6 December 2025
19:00

Singapore	1–3	Timor-Leste
Amir 11'	Report	Canavaro 19'; Correia 42'; Olagar 45+1'

Rajamangala Stadium, Bangkok
Referee: Asker Nadjafaliev (Uzbekistan)
