= Large-format projection =

Mostly large-format projection (or large-image projection) is used for the use of large-format slide projectors or extremely powerful video projectors for producing still-standing or dynamic images on projection areas of about 100–10,000 m^{2} and more. Sometimes the use of slide projector and video projector is combined to reach a kind of "picture in picture" projection to enable larger projections with a dynamic part inside. But that is a speciality of projection artists which have a lot of detailed know how of the projection parameters.
