= Lala Karmela =

Indonesian singer (born 1985)

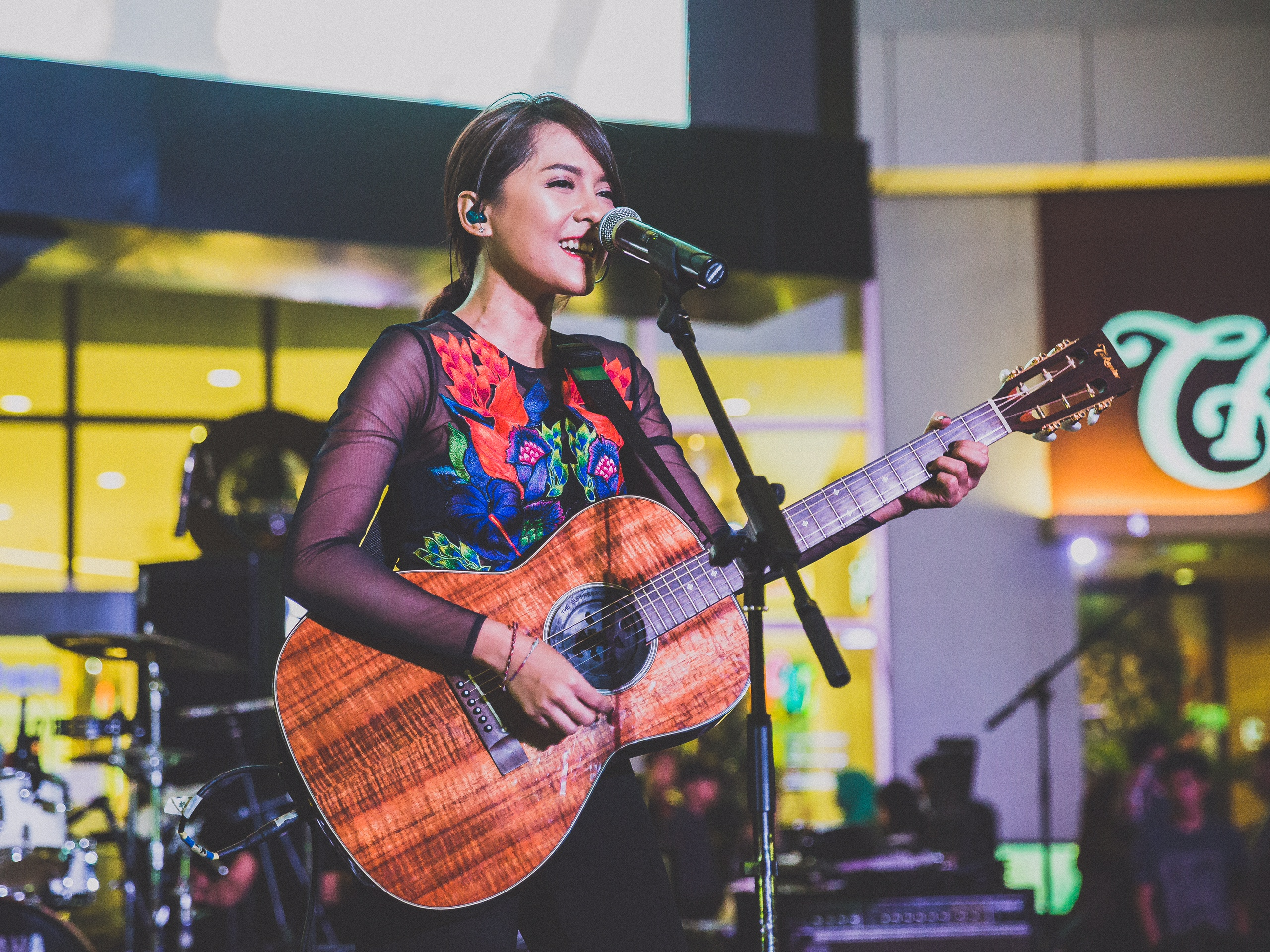

Background information
- Born: Karmela Mudayatri Kartodirdjo; 2 April 1985 (age 40); Jakarta, Indonesia
- Genres: Pop music
- Occupation: Singer
- Instruments: Vocals; guitar
- Years active: 2002–present
- Labels: Warner Music Philippines; Sony Music Indonesia; Sinjitos Records; Organic Records
- Spouse: Christopher Villa Hartland (m. 2021)

Karmela Mudayatri Kartodirdjo, better known as Lala Karmela, is an Indonesian singer-songwriter and actress. She has recorded music with Warner Music Philippines and with Sony Music Indonesia.

Before embarking on a solo singing career, she was a member of a music group called Inersia.

== Career ==
Before her singing career took off, Lala was active in several teen soap operas, including Senandung Masa Puber (2003—2004). A year later, Lala joined a teen music group called Inersia, which released the album Bersama. Through the group's music video appearances, Lala's talent was discovered by a booking agent in the Philippines named Ronnie Henares, who offered her a recording contract there.

Career in the Philippines

After finishing her studies, she moved to the Philippines to pursue a singing career. In the Philippines, she was signed by Warner Music. Lala had a music career in the Philippines for 3 years, releasing her debut solo album titled Stars in mid-2007, and releasing the singles Waitin' and Unsaid, which was a duet with Christian Bautista.

Return to Indonesia

In late 2009, Lala returned to Indonesia and continued her music career with Sony Music Indonesia, releasing the single Buka Semangat Baru, which was a jingle for Coca-Cola. In 2010, Lala released the album Kamu, Aku, Cinta and changed her stage name from Lala to Lala Karmela. The song Satu Jam Saja, which became a hit single from the album Kamu, Aku, Cinta, became the theme song for the 2010 film Satu Jam Saja.

In 2012, Lala left Sony Music Indonesia and joined the independent label Sinjitos Records, releasing her third album, Between Us. In 2013, Lala was chosen to sing a song titled Malam Sunyi di Cipaganti, composed by Indonesia's sixth president, Susilo Bambang Yudhoyono. In 2016, Lala released her fourth album, Solina, with Organic Records.

== Personal life ==
On 21 December 2021, Lala married Christopher Hartland.

== Filmography ==
- Seleb Kota Jogja (SKJ)
- Ngenest
- Lafran

== Discography ==
=== Studio albums ===
- Stars (2007; Warner Music Philippines)
- Kamu, Aku, Cinta (2011; Sony Music Indonesia)
- Between Us (2013; Sinjitos Records)

=== Singles ===
==== English singles ====
- "Stars"
- "It's You"
- "Waiting"
- "What About You"
- "Unsaid" (feat. Christian Bautista)
- "Morning Star" (2012)
- "Let's Go for a Ride" (2014)
- "A Night to Remember" (2015)

==== Indonesian singles ====
- "Buka Semangat Baru" (Open New Spirit)
- "Hasrat Cinta" (Love Passion)
- "Satu Jam Saja" (Just One Hour; 2010)
- "Setulus Hati" (With a Sincere Heart; 2010)
- "Kamu, Aku, Cinta" (You, Me, Love; 2011)
- "Malam Sunyi di Cipaganti" (Quiet Night in Cipaganti; 2013)
- "Berkilau" (Sparkling; 2013)
- "Selamanya" (Forever; 2014)

== Awards and nominations ==
Year	Award giving body	Category	Nominated work	Results
2008	Awit Awards	Best Performance by a New Female Recording Artist (Performance Award)	"Stars"	Nominated
2008	Awit Awards	Best Performance by a Duet	"Unsaid" with Christian Bautista	Nominated
2008	Awit Awards	Best Performance by a New Female Recording Artist (People's Choice Award)	"Stars"	Nominated
