= Shorinji Kempo at the 2011 SEA Games =

Shorinji Kempo was one of 44 sports and disciplines featured at the 2011 Southeast Asian Games.

== Medal summary ==
=== Embu ===
==== Men ====
Event	Gold	Silver	Bronze
Kumi Embu Pair Kyu Kenshi	Indonesia; Arif Rahman Nasir; Revy Pratama Syam	Laos; Bounkham Botsavang; Okhe Botsavang	Timor-Leste; Abrao Pinto; Antonio Manuel
Kumi Embu Pair Yudansha	Indonesia; Pratama Dany Prihandoko; Rifki Andrian	Brunei; Ali Alipah; Muhd Shamsul	Timor-Leste; Eugenio Ribeiro; Domingos Savio

==== Women ====
Event	Gold	Silver	Bronze
Kumi Embu Pair Kyu Kenshi	Laos; Youmyin Bounpasong; Meme Yoisaykham	Indonesia; Leni Marlinah; Yunika Asyora	Vietnam; Lê Dương Lan Phương; Trần Thị Mỹ Duyên
Kumi Embu Pair Yudansha	Indonesia; Ika Puspa Dewi; Ninik Purwanti	Vietnam; Lê Dương Lan Phương; Trần Thị Mỹ Duyên	Laos; Bounmy Sisombath; Chansouda Phetsiriseng

==== Mixed ====
Event	Gold	Silver	Bronze
Kumi Embu Pair Kyu Kenshi	Timor-Leste; Julianto Pereira; Dorceyana Borges	Indonesia; Erik Syahputra; Isna Suryani	Cambodia; Kong Savorn; Sovan Rachana
Kumi Embu Pair Yudansha	Indonesia; I Made Indrawan; Dwi Afriyanti	Timor-Leste; Domingos Savio; Fidelia Da Costa Pereira	Vietnam; Nguyen Thien Tuong; Trần Thị Mỹ Duyên
Dantai Embu Group Kyu Kenshi	Indonesia; Ridho Ihsan; Ferdy Firmanda Sura; Dewi Aristiani; Vonny Suzendra; Yunika Asyora; Helmi Yanuar; Leni Marlinah; Jani Mataliti Bone	Vietnam; Nguyễn Bá Tân; Phan Thị Kiều Duyên; Phạm Thị Mão; Đỗ Hồng Ngọc; Nguyễn Kim Nguyên; Nguyễn Vũ Đăng	Timor-Leste; Antonio Manuel; Lola Caldas Da Silva Da Costa; Julianto Pereira; Abrao Pinto; Dorceyana Borges; Mekita Lebre
Dantai Embu Group Yudansha	Indonesia; Aljufri; Arif Satria Indra Sulita; Menah Suprianah; Mulya Ladriman Sitanggang; Siti Nurhayati Ali; Arif Nurachman; Dwi Putri Kisnasari; Jenneth Pascarany Dethan	Brunei; Muhd Shamsul; Rafidah Rosli; Ali Alipah; Dzulhusmie Haji Kahan	Vietnam; Nguyễn Thùy Dương; Lê Dương Lan Phương; Nguyen Thien Tuong; Nguyễn Tâm Thanh Tịnh; Nguyễn Phú Hiển; Trần Thị Mỹ Duyên; Long Điền; Le Duong Tuyet Van

=== Randori ===
==== Men ====
Event	Gold	Silver	Bronze
50 kg	Nguyễn Bá Tân; Vietnam	Almadi; Indonesia	Phat Saren; Cambodia
50 kg	Nguyễn Bá Tân; Vietnam	Almadi; Indonesia	Suea Thammakesone; Laos
55 kg	Okhe Botsavang; Laos	Pande Putu Palguna; Indonesia	Kong Savorn; Cambodia
55 kg	Okhe Botsavang; Laos	Pande Putu Palguna; Indonesia	Nguyễn Phú Hiển; Vietnam
60 kg	Sovan Kiri; Cambodia	Khonesavanh Soundala; Laos	Nyoman Sudarmawan; Indonesia
60 kg	Sovan Kiri; Cambodia	Khonesavanh Soundala; Laos	Long Điền; Vietnam
65 kg	Châu Nguyên Quốc; Vietnam	Yules Umbu Hamba Pulu; Indonesia	Un Sovannara; Cambodia
65 kg	Châu Nguyên Quốc; Vietnam	Yules Umbu Hamba Pulu; Indonesia	Anouvong Phetsiriseng; Laos

==== Women ====
Event	Gold	Silver	Bronze
48 kg	Đỗ Hồng Ngọc; Vietnam	Anna Yunita Gelu; Indonesia	Sovan Ratanak; Cambodia
48 kg	Đỗ Hồng Ngọc; Vietnam	Anna Yunita Gelu; Indonesia	Mimi Yoysaykham; Laos
51 kg	Nguyễn Thùy Dương; Vietnam	Ade Irma; Indonesia	Branom Channary; Cambodia
51 kg	Nguyễn Thùy Dương; Vietnam	Ade Irma; Indonesia	Phouthasone Keoxayavong; Laos
54 kg	Riny Imelda Samol; Indonesia	Lê Thị Thu Hằng; Vietnam	Chansouda Phetsiriseng; Laos
54 kg	Riny Imelda Samol; Indonesia	Lê Thị Thu Hằng; Vietnam	Mekita Lebre; Timor-Leste
57 kg	Ligar Nur Lailah; Indonesia	Sovan Rachana; Cambodia	Bounmy Sisombath; Laos
57 kg	Ligar Nur Lailah; Indonesia	Sovan Rachana; Cambodia	Le Duong Tuyet Van; Vietnam

== Medal table ==
* Host nation (Indonesia)

Rank	Nation	Gold	Silver	Bronze	Total
1	Indonesia (INA)*	8	7	1	16
2	Vietnam (VIE)	4	3	6	13
3	Laos (LAO)	2	2	7	11
4	Cambodia (CAM)	1	1	6	8
5	Timor-Leste (TLS)	1	1	4	6
6	Brunei (BRU)	0	2	0	2
Totals (6 entries)		16	16	24	56
