= Nwe Ni Oo =

Burmese boxer

- နွယ်နီဦး
- Born: Phyuu, Taungoo District, Bago Region, Myanmar
- Parent: Aung Thet Oo (father)
- Awards: 27th Southeast Asian Games (Gold Medal); 30th Southeast Asia Games (silver medal)

Nwe Ni Oo (Burmese: နွယ်နီဦး) is a Burmese boxer. She won the gold medal in the boxing finals of the 27th Southeast Asian Games, held in Myanmar in December 2013. It was the first time in 50 years that Myanmar won a gold medal in boxing.

She won bronze medal in a competition at the Bantamweight (54 kg) at Boxing at the 2015 Southeast Asian Games. She won silver medal in a competition at the Featherweight (57 kg) in 2019 Southeast Asian Games.

== Early life and education ==
Nwe Ni Oo was born in Phyuu, Taungoo District, Bago Region. She is the oldest daughter in her family, having five sisters and brother. She was only in fifth grade when she left school to help support her family.
