= The Space Between Us (novel) =

2006 novel by Thrity Umrigar

- The first-edition cover as published by William Morrow and Company
- Author: Thrity Umrigar
- Language: English
- Genre: Fiction
- Publisher: William Morrow
- Publication date: January 2006
- Publication place: United States
- Media type: Print (hardcover, paperback)
- Pages: 336 (Hardcover)
- ISBN: 978-0-06-079155-1
- OCLC: 60589226

The Space Between Us is the second novel by Thrity Umrigar, published by William Morrow and Company in January 2006. Set in present-day Mumbai, India, the novel follows the lives of two women: Serabai Dubash, an upper-middle-class widow, and her domestic servant, Bhima. The pair experience similar situations in their lives: abuse, the death or absence of a husband, a pregnant dependent, and the hope for a better future. Told using an omniscient third-person narrative in mainly present tense, the novel incorporates Hindi words and phrases amongst predominantly English text.

Influenced by Umrigar's real-life experience with the employer-servant relationship, the novel explores social class in India and the division of power in society. Umrigar, who was born and lived in Mumbai until the age of twenty-one, modeled Bhima after a domestic servant of the same name who worked in her childhood home and for whom Umrigar had much admiration. Upon its release, The Space Between Us received largely positive reviews from English-language critics. While the majority of reviewers enjoyed Umrigar's simple, descriptive prose, a few questioned whether she depended on clichés and exaggeration. Critics praised her lively depiction of Mumbai and the sympathetic characters, and noted the social commentary present in the novel.

== Plot ==
The Space Between Us takes place in present-day India and centers on two women: Serabai (Sera) Dubash, an upper-middle-class, Parsi widow, and her domestic servant of more than twenty years, Bhima. Now sixty-five years old, illiterate Bhima lives in the slums of Mumbai with her pregnant, unwed granddaughter, the seventeen-year-old Maya, whose college tuition is paid for by Sera. Through flashbacks, Bhima remembers her husband, who, after a work-related accident caused him to lose three fingers, became an alcoholic and abandoned her, taking their son Amit with him. She also remembers her daughter Pooja, who married, but died of AIDS together with her husband, leaving Maya an orphan at a young age.

Since the sudden death of her physically abusive husband three years ago, Sera has cared for her disabled mother-in-law, who had insisted on isolating her from the family when Sera was menstruating. Sera also tends to her pregnant daughter Dinaz, and pays for Maya's abortion. A while later, Maya reluctantly tells Bhima that Dinaz's husband Viraf impregnated her and told her to keep it a secret so that she could continue her education and Bhima could keep her job. Angered, Bhima confronts Viraf, and he later accuses her of stealing ₹700 (US$7.30) from the cupboard. Sera dismisses her, unable to listen to Bhima's hints about Viraf's actions towards Maya. Bhima leaves, and recalling a balloon seller whom she had admired, buys ₹20 (21¢ US) worth of balloons and goes to the seaside. She resolves to deal with tomorrow.

== Style and themes ==
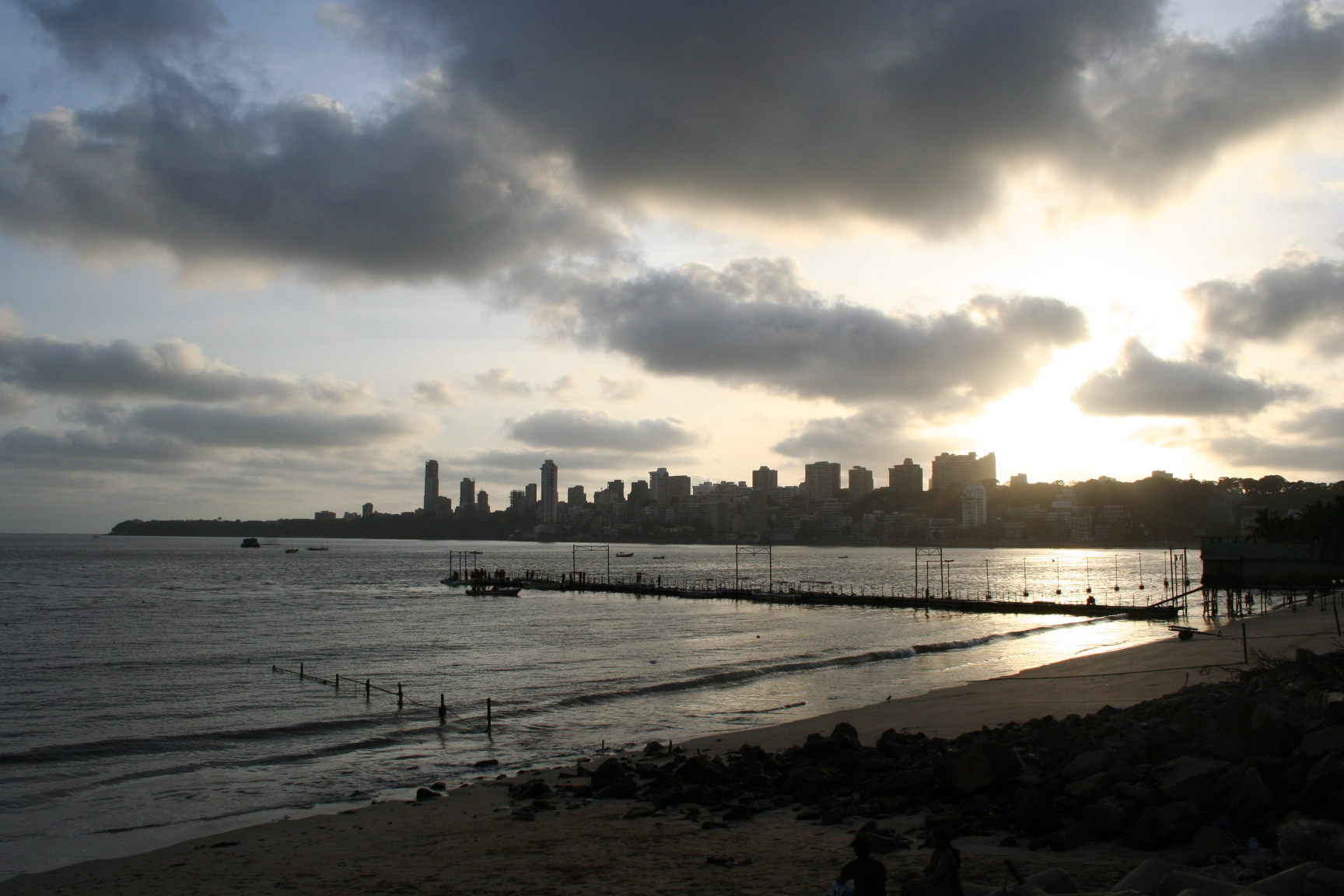
Fond of visiting the sea as a child, Umrigar presents it in The Space Between Us as a way for the people to replenish their spirit and connect with nature.

Using an omniscient third-person narrative, The Space Between Us is divided between the stories of its two protagonists, Sera and Bhima. Although the novel occasionally explores their memories in flashbacks, Thrity Umrigar wrote much of the novel in the present tense and used adjectives, similes, and metaphors frequently in her descriptions. She also incorporated Hindi words alongside English ones in the novel: "What is this, baba? So-so much money," says one character, for example. According to The Independent's Aamer Hussein, "Umrigar's preoccupations are the classic and abiding tropes of domestic middlebrow fiction: love and families, marriage, childbirth, betrayal, lack and loss."

Among the many issues explored—"poverty engendering poverty; the power of privilege and wealth; domestic violence;... education; women's rights; AIDS"—the novel examines the class system in India. The protagonists undergo parallel situations in their lives: abuse from men they loved, enduring "shame and disappointment", expecting the successes of their children to bring them happiness, and comforting each other through their bond. Claudia Webb of the London Financial Times stated: "The one element that separates them is money." While the protagonists share a closer relationship than many masters and servants in India, Sera looks down on Bhima and refuses to let her sit on a chair in her house or drink from the same glass. Ligaya Mishan of The New York Times saw a parallel in Sera's "mother-in-law's superstition and her physical aversion to Bhima, whom she imagines to be covered in a 'sheen of dirtiness.'" Additionally, Umrigar explored the strength of friendship among the characters, which the class system and its bias threaten. The character Dinaz has some of the views about the master-servant relationship that Umrigar had as a teenager. The author has said that children in general are able to "see through the social clutter" of the classes.

Gender and the division of power play a prominent role in The Space Between Us. The male characters often use their power and advantage in society to mistreat others in "cruel and abusive ways", according to The Washington Post's Francis Itani. Feroz, Viraf, and the administrator from Gopal's factory thrive in the class system, using their male power to bully and cheat others. Friendship among the female characters is presented as a potential way for them to overcome "individual isolation and loneliness". Judy Budz of The Boston Globe wrote: "Will women support each other in the face of family obligations, powerful husbands, and the desire for upward mobility in a downwardly mobile environment?" Umrigar considered the novel more about the division, use, and effects of power in society, rather than the gender divide. She viewed many of the male characters as "victims", instead of abusers. She cited Gopal as an example: he suffers an accident at work, the cause of which she attributed to "the greed of others," and ultimately falls apart as a result. Additionally, Feroz shared a loving relationship with Sera in the beginning; Umrigar suggested that his mother may have negatively influenced his attitude towards women.

== Development and publication ==
"And yet, even in the midst of my adolescent disdain for the middle-class adults in my life, I saw enough complexity in the transactions between servant and homeowner to soften that disdain, to make me realize that reality is always harder than caricature."

— Umrigar

Born in Mumbai, India, Umrigar lived there for almost twenty-one years as an only child in a middle-class extended family of aunts and uncles in addition to her parents. Growing up, she witnessed poverty, which greatly impacted her childhood as she could not forget it. As a teenager, the newly socialist Umrigar felt "uneasy being a card-carrying member of the middle class" and possessed much admiration for Bhima, a domestic servant who worked for her family and whom she later modeled the protagonist of the same name after. One day, after a year of the teenage Umrigar's efforts to learn about her life, Bhima sat on the couch—which she cleaned, but was forbidden to sit on—and asked her to play "an old Marathi folk song" instead of the foreign "Let It Be" by The Beatles that she had been listening to. Umrigar recalled: "[T]he authority in her voice thrilled me, made me feel that we were equals at last, that the cursed roles of servant and mistress had shattered for one fragile, shimmering instant."

Umrigar moved to the United States at the age of twenty-one and after attending Ohio State University for two years, worked as a journalist for seventeen years. In spring 2003, she started her second novel, The Space Between Us, and finished the first draft in under six months. When she began the novel, she knew the beginning and final lines and that the two would serve "as bookends to the novel." Her goal for the story was to portray "the connections and the separations, the intimacy and the distance between women of different classes." Having completed the first draft so quickly, she could not recall much about the process of writing or crafting the plot, only "specific moments." One of her chief concerns while writing was presenting an authentic, present-day India even though she moved away more than twenty-three years ago and did not follow the pop culture there; she resolved to "write about things that are timeless." While on trips to visit her family in India, she mentally recorded the current dialogue and the changes in Mumbai since she had left. Umrigar dedicated the book to "the real Bhima and the millions like her." William Morrow and Company, an imprint of HarperCollins, published The Space Between Us on January 10, 2006.

== Reception ==
The Space Between Us received largely positive reviews. While most reviewers enjoyed Umrigar's prose, several questioned whether or not she used clichés or exaggeration. Mishan praised Umrigar as "a perceptive and often piercing writer, although her prose occasionally tips into flamboyant overstatement." Calcutta Telegraph's Sreyashi Dastidar wrote the empathy that Umrigar writes with made up for "the situational clichés and the forced Indianness of the English dialogue." While noting "Umrigar's reliance on cliche," Karen R. Long of The Plain Dealer praised "the book's musicality, enhanced with a smattering of Hindi words and cadences" and Umrigar's depiction of guilt and "the way love mixes with cruelty and loneliness." The Book Report's Jennifer Krieger enjoyed "the clarity and simplicity in Umrigar's style as well as a devotion to detail" and the images which she populates the text with. Umrigar's depiction of Indian everyday life also was praised as realistic and engaging. Writing for The Scotsman, Natasha Mann described Mumbai as the "perfect setting" for a novel about the class system, but questioned the absence of characters other than "middle-class, insular" Indians. "To read these comparisons is to understand that Umrigar's Bombay is a place where robust foods figure prominently, elements like wind and sea are driving forces, and religious beliefs underscore everything," commented the San Francisco Chronicle's Lynn Andriani. In general, the characters of Bhima and Sera have been regarded as realistic and sympathetic by reviewers.

Reviewers also discussed the social commentary present in the novel. Kirkus Reviews called it "[a] subtle, elegant analysis of class and power." Beacon Journal's Mary Ethridge wrote: "The Space Between Us is not meant to be read as a social commentary about race or class, although it certainly has some powerful messages along those lines. Rather, it is an elegant novel of the heart and spirit whose characters are testament to the essential human drive – to find joy, peace and love where we can." Andriani compared The Space Between Us to Khaled Hosseini's The Kite Runner, a 2003 novel set mainly in Afghanistan which deals with characters of various social classes. The Economist attributed the novel's success in not becoming "emotional soup" to the variety of issues examined. Budz describes the novel as "a treatment of modern India, where women recognize their sameness but cannot bridge the space that separates them."

== Sequel ==
A sequel, The Secrets Between Us, was published in 2019.
