= Between Us (Lala Karmela album) =

Studio album by Lala
- Released: May 25, 2013
- Recorded: 2012
- Genres: Indie pop, indie rock, adult contemporary
- Length: 32:55
- Labels: Sinjitos Records; Demajors
- Producer: Joseph Saryuf

Lala chronology
Kamu, Aku, Cinta (2011)	Between Us (2013)

Singles from Between Us
- 1. "Berkilau" Released: June 2013; 2. "Selamanya" Released: December 2013; 3. "Let's Go for a Ride" Released: September 2014

Professional ratings
Review scores
Source	Rating
Rolling Stone Indonesia	3.5/5 stars

Between Us is the third studio album by Indonesian-Filipina singer Lala.

== Track listing ==
No.	Title	Music	Length
1.	"Morning Star"	Lala Karmela, Joseph Saryuf	3:52
2.	"Between Us"	Lala Karmela	3:59
3.	"Berkilau"	Lala Karmela, Joseph Saryuf	3:27
4.	"Let's Go for a Ride"	Lala Karmela, Joseph Saryuf	3:49
5.	"I Don't Know What to Wear"	Lala Karmela	4:06
6.	"Selamanya"	Lala Karmela	4:08
7.	"This Moment"	Lala Karmela, Joseph Saryuf	4:30
8.	"You Got Me Again"	Lala Karmela	4:55

== Release history ==
Country	Release date
Indonesia	May 25, 2013
